= Dael Fry =

English footballer (born 1997)

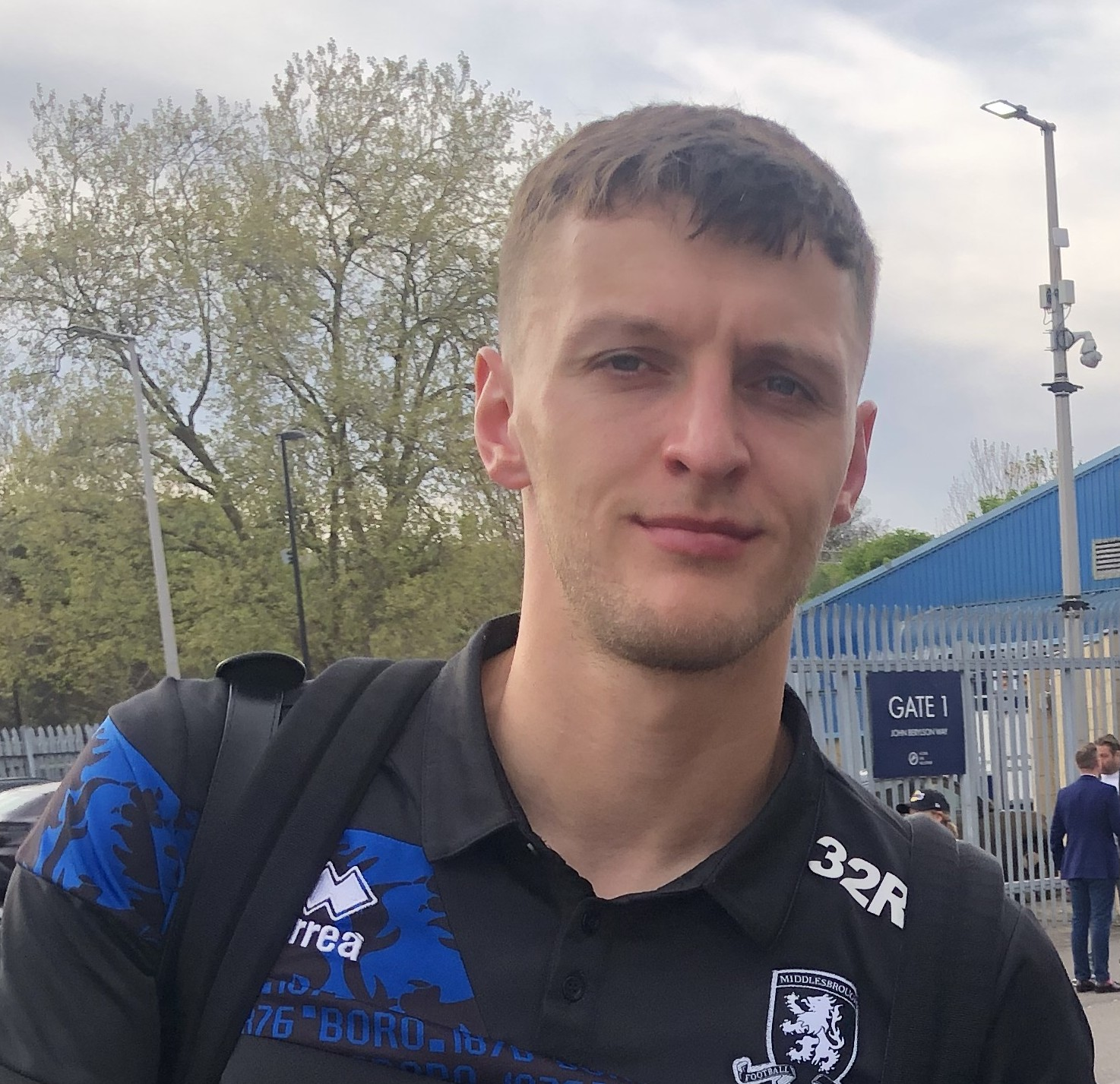
- Fry with Middlesbrough in 2025

Personal information
- Full name: Dael Jonathan Fry
- Date of birth: 30 August 1997 (age 29)
- Place of birth: Middlesbrough, England
- Height: 6 ft 4 in (1.93 m)
- Position: Centre-back

Team information
- Current team: Birmingham City
- Number: 23

Youth career
- 2006–2014: Middlesbrough

Senior career*
Years	Team	Apps	(Gls)
2014–2026	Middlesbrough	272	(5)
2016–2017	→ Rotherham United (loan)	10	(0)
2026–	Birmingham City	2	(0)

International career
2014	England U17	8	(0)
2014–2015	England U18	5	(0)
2015–2016	England U19	10	(0)
2016–2017	England U20	10	(0)
2017–2019	England U21	11	(2)
- * Club domestic league appearances and goals as of 24 October 2026 (UTC)

Dael Jonathan Fry (born 30 August 1997) is an English professional footballer who plays as a centre-back for EFL Championship club Birmingham City.

Fry has represented England at under-17, under-18, under-19, under-20 and under-21 levels. He has won the 2014 UEFA European Under-17 Championship, 2017 FIFA U-20 World Cup and 2018 Toulon Tournament with his country.

== Early life and career ==
Dael Jonathan Fry was born on 30 August 1997 in Middlesbrough, North Yorkshire. He was scouted by Middlesbrough F.C. after being spotted playing for his local team Cleveland Juniors at the age of seven. Throughout the ranks of the Middlesbrough youth team, Fry made an impression with his progress at the academy. In October 2014, Fry signed his first professional contract with the club.

== Club career ==
=== Middlesbrough ===
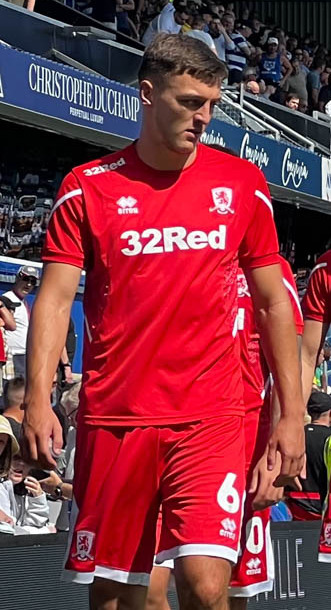
Fry with Middlesbrough in 2022.

Fry made his first-team debut for Middlesbrough on 9 August 2015 at the age of 17, on the opening day of the 2015–16 Championship season – playing from the start and was named man of the match in a 0–0 draw against Preston North End. On 14 September, he signed a new five-year contract with Middlesbrough. Following an injury to Daniel Ayala, manager Aitor Karanka gave Fry a chance to cover in Ayala's absence and played his first Middlesbrough match in months on 15 February 2016 in a 0–0 draw against Leeds United. After the match, Karanka praised Fry's performance. Fry made a handful of appearances between 15 February and 13 March 2016. Although he returned to the bench later in the 2015–16 season, Fry went on to make eight appearances in all competitions.

On 31 August 2016, Fry joined Rotherham United on loan until the end of the 2016–17 season. Fry made his debut on 10 September, playing the whole game in a 2–2 draw against Bristol City. Fry made 10 starts for the club before the loan was terminated early on 1 January 2017, having not featured for the club since November. After his loan spell at Rotherham came to an end, Fry only made two appearances for Middlesbrough in the 2016–17 season, which both came in the FA Cup against Accrington Stanley and Manchester City. Earlier in the 2016–17 season, Fry signed a long-term contract with the club, contracting him until June 2021.

Fry scored his first goal for Middlesbrough on 23 February 2021 in a 3–1 loss to Bristol City.

=== Birmingham City ===
On 3 July 2026, Fry joined Championship club Birmingham City on a three-year deal.

== International career ==
Fry made his debut for the England national under-17 team on 28 January 2014, coming on as a second-half substitute, in a 2–1 win over Belgium. He was a member of the England under-17 squad that won the 2014 UEFA European Under-17 Championship, beating the Netherlands 4–1 in a penalty-shoot-out in the final.

Fry was called up to the under-18 team and made his debut on 3 September 2014 in a 4–1 win over the Netherlands.

After a year with the under-19 team, Fry was called up by the under-20 team in August 2016. He made his under-20 debut on 1 September in a 1–1 draw against Brazil. Fry was also a member of the England under-20 squad that won the 2017 FIFA U-20 World Cup in South Korea.

Fry was part of the under-21 team that won the 2018 Toulon Tournament.

== Career statistics ==
As of match played 9 May 2026

Appearances and goals by club, season and competition
Club	Season	League			FA Cup		League Cup		Other		Total	
Club	Season	Division	Apps	Goals	Apps	Goals	Apps	Goals	Apps	Goals	Apps	Goals
Middlesbrough	2015–16	Championship	7	0	0	0	1	0	—		8	0
Middlesbrough	2016–17	Premier League	0	0	2	0	0	0	—		2	0
Middlesbrough	2017–18	Championship	13	0	1	0	3	0	1 (Note: Appearances in Championship play-offs)	0	18	0
Middlesbrough	2018–19	Championship	34	0	2	0	3	0	—		39	0
Middlesbrough	2019–20	Championship	36	0	2	0	0	0	—		38	0
Middlesbrough	2020–21	Championship	32	1	0	0	2	0	—		34	1
Middlesbrough	2021–22	Championship	33	1	3	0	0	0	—		36	1
Middlesbrough	2022–23	Championship	30	0	1	0	1	0	0	0	32	0
Middlesbrough	2023–24	Championship	28	0	1	0	6	0	—		35	0
Middlesbrough	2024–25	Championship	21	0	0	0	0	0	0	0	21	0
Middlesbrough	2025–26	Championship	29	3	1	0	1	0	3	0	37	3
Middlesbrough	Total		263	5	13	0	17	0	2	0	300	5
Rotherham United (loan)	2016–17	Championship	10	0	—		—		—		10	0
Career total			273	5	13	0	17	0	2	0	310	5

== Honours ==
England U17

- UEFA European Under-17 Championship: 2014

England U20

- FIFA U-20 World Cup: 2017

England U21

- Toulon Tournament: 2018

Individual

- Toulon Tournament Best XI: 2018
