= 2018–19 Middlesbrough F.C. season =

Middlesbrough
2018–19 season
- Chairman: Steve Gibson
- Manager: Tony Pulis
- Stadium: Riverside Stadium
- Championship: 7th
- FA Cup: Fourth round
- EFL Cup: Quarter-finals
- Top goalscorer: League: Britt Assombalonga (14); All: Britt Assombalonga (16)
- Highest home attendance: 30,881 vs Leeds United, Championship, 9 February 2019
- Lowest home attendance: 9,942 vs Notts County, EFL Cup, 14 August 2018
- Average home league attendance: 23,164
- Biggest win: 5–0 vs Peterborough United (H), FA Cup, 5 January 2019
- Biggest defeat: 0–3 vs Aston Villa (H), Championship, 1 December 2018; 0–3 vs Aston Villa (A), Championship, 16 March 2019; 0–3 vs Nottingham Forest (A), Championship, 22 April 2019
Home colours	Away colours	Third colours

The 2018–19 season was Middlesbrough's second consecutive season in the Championship in their 143rd year in existence; the club also competed in the FA Cup and the EFL Cup.

== Season overview ==
The 2018–19 transfer window was club manager Tony Pulis' first official summer transfer window as Middlesbrough manager. Pulis' first signing of the window was a defensive Paddy McNair, arriving from rivals Sunderland for £5 million. Bristol City star defender Aden Flint subsequently joined the club for a fee of £7 million. Sam Stubbs and Djed Spence then joined the reserves, both on free transfers, arriving from Wigan Athletic and Fulham respectively. As August emerged, Andy Lonergan joined the club on a free transfer from rivals Leeds United. On 8 August 2018, Middlesbrough completed the signing of Jordan Hugill from West Ham United on a season-long loan deal.

Tomás Mejías, Martin Cranie, Tom Brewitt, Liam Cooke, Liam Hegarty, Jakub Sinior, Keiran Storey, Robbie Tinkler, Jay Wilson and Matthew Elsdon were all released at the end of the 2017–18 season. Antonio Barragán then left the club to join Real Betis permanently, having spent the previous season on loan there, while Mikael Soisalo and Fábio left to join Zulte Waregem and Nantes respectively. Players who were loaned out included Joe Fryer to Carlisle United, Hayden Coulson to St Mirren, Luke Armstrong to Gateshead, George Miller to Bradford City. The club then said their goodbyes to their team superstars: striker Patrick Bamford to Leeds, centre-back Ben Gibson and winger Adama Traoré.

== Squad ==
=== First team squad ===
As of 30 August 2018.

Squad No.	Name	Nationality	Position(s)	Date of birth (age)	Previous team
Goalkeepers
1	Dimitrios Konstantopoulos	(Greece)	GK	29 November 1978 (aged 39)	(Greece) AEK Athens
23	Darren Randolph	(Republic of Ireland)	GK	12 May 1987 (aged 31)	(England) West Ham United
31	Andy Lonergan	(England)	GK	19 October 1983 (aged 34)	(England) Leeds United
Defenders
3	George Friend	(England)	LB	17 October 1987 (aged 30)	(England) Doncaster Rovers
4	Daniel Ayala	(Spain)	CB	7 November 1990 (aged 27)	(England) Norwich City
5	Ryan Shotton	(England)	RB	30 October 1988 (aged 29)	(England) Birmingham City
14	Sam McQueen L	(England)	LB	6 February 1995 (aged 23)	(England) Southampton
20	Dael Fry	(England)	CB	30 August 1997 (aged 21)	Academy
24	Aden Flint	(England)	CB	11 July 1989 (aged 29)	(England) Bristol City
25	Nathan Wood	(England)	CB	31 May 2002 (aged 16)	Academy
Midfielders
7	Grant Leadbitter	(England)	DM / CM	7 January 1986 (aged 32)	(England) Ipswich Town
8	Adam Clayton	(England)	DM / CM	14 January 1989 (aged 29)	(England) Huddersfield Town
15	Julien De Sart	(Belgium)	DM	23 December 1994 (aged 23)	(Belgium) Standard Liège
16	Jonny Howson	(England)	CM	21 May 1988 (aged 30)	(England) Norwich City
17	Paddy McNair	(Northern Ireland)	DM / CM	27 April 1995 (aged 23)	(England) Sunderland
19	Stewart Downing	(England)	AM / LM / RM	22 July 1984 (aged 34)	(England) West Ham United
21	Marvin Johnson	(England)	LW	1 December 1990 (aged 27)	(England) Oxford United
26	Lewis Wing	(England)	AM	23 May 1995 (aged 23)	(England) Shildon
27	Harrison Chapman	(England)	AM	5 November 1997 (aged 20)	Academy
28	Marcus Tavernier	(England)	LW	22 March 1999 (aged 19)	Academy
37	Muhamed Bešić L	(Bosnia and Herzegovina)	DM	10 September 1992 (aged 25)	(England) Everton
Strikers
9	Britt Assombalonga	(Democratic Republic of the Congo)	ST	6 December 1992 (aged 25)	(England) Nottingham Forest
10	Martin Braithwaite	(Denmark)	CF / FW	5 June 1991 (aged 27)	(France) Toulouse
11	Jordan Hugill	(England)	ST	6 April 1992 (aged 26)	(England) West Ham United
18	Ashley Fletcher	(England)	ST	2 October 1995 (aged 22)	(England) West Ham United
39	Rudy Gestede	(Benin)	FW	10 October 1988 (aged 29)	(England) Aston Villa

- L = Player on Loan

== Competitions ==
=== Pre-season friendlies ===
As part of their pre-season preparations, Middlesbrough faced Sturm Graz, Spennymoor Town, SV Sandhausen, Accrington Stanley, Rochdale and Hartlepool United. Their match against Sunderland was abandoned at half-time because of storm conditions.

5 July 2018 Friendly	Sturm Graz	1–0	Middlesbrough	Kumberg, Austria
18:00 BST	Pink 42'	Report		Stadium: Well Welt Stadion

10 July 2018 Friendly	Spennymoor Town	0–2	Middlesbrough	Spennymoor
19:45 BST		Report	Bamford 2'; Assombalonga 68'	Stadium: Brewery Field

14 July 2018 Friendly	SV Sandhausen	0–1	Middlesbrough	Mindelheim, Germany
18:00 BST		Report	Bamford 35' (pen.)	Stadium: Julius Strohmayer Stadion

18 July 2018 Friendly	Augsburg	2–1	Middlesbrough	Bad Wörishofen, Germany
17:30 BST	Baier 37'; Hahn 61'	Report	Wing 86'	Stadium: Sportplatz Bad Wörishofen

21 July 2018 Friendly	Accrington Stanley	4–3	Middlesbrough	Accrington
15:00 BST	Hughes 33'; Kee 36' (pen.); Jackson 44'; Sykes 88'	Report	McNair 16'; Howson 54'; Traoré 62'	Stadium: Wham Stadium; Referee: Richard Brooks

24 July 2018 Friendly	Rochdale	3–2	Middlesbrough	Rochdale
19:30 BST	Andrew 69'; Inman 85'; Rathbone 90+1'	Report	Fletcher 13'; Chapman 52'	Stadium: Crown Oil Arena; Attendance: 909; Referee: Graham Salisbury

27 July 2018 Friendly	Middlesbrough	A–A	Sunderland	Middlesbrough
19:30 BST		Report		Stadium: Riverside Stadium
Note: Abandoned at half-time (0-0) due to weather

28 July 2018 Friendly	Hartlepool United	0–5	Middlesbrough	Hartlepool
13:00 BST		Report	Assombalonga 34', 37', 45'; Fletcher 41', 46'	Stadium: Victoria Park; Attendance: 1,747; Referee: Andrew Miller

=== Championship ===
==== League table ====
Pos	Team	Pld	W	D	L	GF	GA	GD	Pts	Promotion, qualification or relegation
4	West Bromwich Albion	46	23	11	12	87	62	+25	80	Qualification for Championship play-offs (Note: Four teams play for one spot and promotion to the Premier League.)
5	Aston Villa (O, P)	46	20	16	10	82	61	+21	76	Qualification for Championship play-offs
6	Derby County	46	20	14	12	69	54	+15	74	Qualification for Championship play-offs
7	Middlesbrough	46	20	13	13	49	41	+8	73	
8	Bristol City	46	19	13	14	59	53	+6	70	
9	Nottingham Forest	46	17	15	14	61	54	+7	66	
10	Swansea City	46	18	11	17	65	62	+3	65	

Source: Sky Sports Archived 25 September 2019 at the Wayback Machine
Rules for classification: 1) Points; 2) Goal difference; 3) Number of goals scored; 4) Head-to-head results
(O) Play-off winners; (P) Promoted

==== Results by matchday ====
Matchday	1	2	3	4	5	6	7	8	9	10	11	12	13	14	15	16	17	18	19	20	21	22	23	24	25	26	27	28	29	30	31	32	33	34	35	36	37	38	39	40	41	42	43	44	45	46
Ground	A	H	H	A	H	A	A	H	H	A	A	H	A	H	H	A	H	A	A	H	H	A	A	H	H	A	A	H	A	H	A	A	H	A	H	H	A	H	H	A	A	H	H	A	H	A
Result	D	W	W	W	W	D	L	W	D	D	W	L	W	D	D	D	W	W	D	L	D	L	W	L	W	D	W	D	W	D	L	W	W	D	L	L	L	L	L	L	W	W	W	L	W	W
Position	10	1	1	2	2	2	4	2	2	3	2	4	1	1	3	4	2	2	3	3	6	6	4	5	5	5	5	5	5	5	6	5	5	5	5	5	5	8	8	8	7	7	6	7	7	7

Updated to match(es) played on 27 April 2019. Source: BBC Sport
A = Away; H = Home; W = Win; D = Draw; L = Loss

==== Result summary ====
Overall								Home						Away					
Pld	W	D	L	GF	GA	GD	Pts	W	D	L	GF	GA	GD	W	D	L	GF	GA	GD
46	20	13	13	49	41	+8	73	10	6	7	23	17	+6	10	7	6	26	24	+2

Last updated: 4 May 2019.
Source: BBC Sport

==== Matches ====
On 21 June 2018, the Championship fixtures for the forthcoming season were announced.

4 August 2018 1	Millwall	2–2	Middlesbrough	Bermondsey
15:00 BST	O'Brien 12'; Gregory 37'	Report	Braithwaite 87'; Friend 90+7'	Stadium: The Den; Attendance: 15,056; Referee: Kevin Friend

7 August 2018 2	Middlesbrough	3–0	Sheffield United	Middlesbrough
19:45 BST	Braithwaite 7'; Flint 18'; Downing 25'	Report		Stadium: Riverside Stadium; Attendance: 22,960; Referee: Robert Jones

11 August 2018 3	Middlesbrough	1–0	Birmingham City	Middlesbrough
15:00 BST	Assombalonga 12'	Report		Stadium: Riverside Stadium; Attendance: 23,748; Referee: Andrew Madley

18 August 2018 4	Bristol City	0–2	Middlesbrough	Bristol
15:00 BST		Report	Braithwaite 13'; Assombalonga 32'	Stadium: Ashton Gate Stadium; Attendance: 19,455; Referee: Oliver Langford

24 August 2018 5	Middlesbrough	1–0	West Bromwich Albion	Middlesbrough
19:45 BST	Ayala 90+1'	Report		Stadium: Riverside Stadium; Attendance: 22,906; Referee: John Brooks

31 August 2018 6	Leeds United	0–0	Middlesbrough	Leeds
19:45 BST		Report		Stadium: Elland Road; Attendance: 35,417; Referee: Tim Robinson

15 September 2018 7	Norwich City	1–0	Middlesbrough	Norwich
15:00 BST	Pukki 58'	Report		Stadium: Carrow Road; Attendance: 24,642; Referee: James Linington

19 September 2018 8	Middlesbrough	2–0	Bolton Wanderers	Middlesbrough
19:45 BST	Saville 34'; Assombalonga 90+5'	Report		Stadium: Riverside Stadium; Attendance: 21,345; Referee: David Coote

22 September 2018 9	Middlesbrough	0–0	Swansea City	Middlesbrough
15:00 BST		Report		Stadium: Riverside Stadium; Attendance: 22,881; Referee: Simon Hooper

29 September 2018 10	Hull City	1–1	Middlesbrough	Kingston-upon-Hull
15:00 BST	Bowen 69' (pen.)	Report	Assombalonga 51'	Stadium: KCOM Stadium; Attendance: 13,185; Referee: Darren England

2 October 2018 11	Ipswich Town	0–2	Middlesbrough	Ipswich
19:45 BST		Report	Bešić 12'; Downing 16'	Stadium: Portman Road; Attendance: 13,612; Referee: Andrew Madley

6 October 2018 12	Middlesbrough	0–2	Nottingham Forest	Middlesbrough
15:00 BST		Report	Lolley 49'; Grabban 77'; Robinson (red card) 80'	Stadium: Riverside Stadium; Attendance: 24,299; Referee: John Brooks

19 October 2018 13	Sheffield Wednesday	1–2	Middlesbrough	Owlerton, Sheffield
19:45 BST	Reach 82'	Report	Bešić 49'; Assombalonga 55'	Stadium: Hillsborough; Attendance: 23,284; Referee: Peter Bankes

23 October 2018 14	Middlesbrough	0–0	Rotherham United	Middlesbrough
15:00 BST		Report		Stadium: Riverside Stadium; Attendance: 21,235; Referee: Darren Bond

27 October 2018 15	Middlesbrough	1–1	Derby County	Middlesbrough
12:30 BST	Bogle 84' (o.g.); Ayala (yellow card) 90'	Report	Friend 19' (o.g.); Waghorn (yellow card) 33'	Stadium: Riverside Stadium; Attendance: 22,907; Referee: Simon Hooper

3 November 2018 16	Stoke City	0–0	Middlesbrough	Stoke-on-Trent
15:00 GMT	Shawcross (yellow card) 20'	Report	Clayton (yellow card) 23'	Stadium: Britannia Stadium; Attendance: 24,553; Referee: Robert Jones

10 November 2018 17	Middlesbrough	2–0	Wigan Athletic	Middlesbrough
15:00 GMT	Hugill 38' (pen.), 44'	Report		Stadium: Riverside Stadium; Attendance: 22,207; Referee: Darren England

24 November 2018 18	Brentford	1–2	Middlesbrough	Brentford
17:30 GMT	Judge 75'	Report	Hugill 56'; Tavernier 61'	Stadium: Griffin Park; Attendance: 9,430; Referee: John Brooks

27 November 2018 19	Preston North End	1–1	Middlesbrough	Preston
19:45 GMT	Browne 43'	Report	Tavernier 46'	Stadium: Deepdale; Attendance: 10,990; Referee: Peter Bankes

1 December 2018 20	Middlesbrough	0–3	Aston Villa	Middlesbrough
17:30 GMT	Friend (yellow card) 71'	Report	Chester 20'; Abraham 65'; Whelan 83'	Stadium: Riverside Stadium; Attendance: 22,207; Referee: Andy Davies

8 December 2018 21	Middlesbrough	1–1	Blackburn Rovers	Middlesbrough
15:00 GMT	Shotton (yellow card) 13'; Bešić (red card) 21'; Assombalonga 62'; Friend (yellow card) 43'	Report	Williams (yellow card) 18'; Mulgrew 22'; Dack (yellow card) 55'	Stadium: Riverside Stadium; Attendance: 21,985; Referee: Simon Hooper

15 December 2018 22	Queens Park Rangers	2–1	Middlesbrough	Shepherd's Bush, London
15:00 GMT	Wszołek 4'; Wells 60'	Report	Saville 51', (yellow card) 58'; Flint (yellow card) 73'; Assombalonga (yellow card) 88'	Stadium: Loftus Road; Attendance: 14,088; Referee: Oliver Langford

22 December 2018 23	Reading	0–1	Middlesbrough	Reading
15:00 GMT (UTC)	Rinomhota (yellow card) 73'; Blackett (yellow card) 90'	Report	Bešić (yellow card) 41'; Friend 77'; Saville (yellow card) 79'	Stadium: Madejski Stadium; Attendance: 14,943; Referee: Steve Martin

26 December 2018 24	Middlesbrough	0–1	Sheffield Wednesday	Middlesbrough
15:00 GMT	Clayton (yellow card) 25'; Ayala (yellow card) 41'; McNair (yellow card) 81'	Report	Reach 20'; Palmer (yellow card) 83'; Fox (yellow card) 86'	Stadium: Riverside Stadium; Attendance: 30,341; Referee: Peter Bankes

29 December 2018 25	Middlesbrough	2–0	Ipswich Town	Middlesbrough
15:00 GMT	Hugill 37' (pen.); Tavernier (yellow card) 65' (goal) 72'	Report	Chalobah (yellow card) 18'; Downes (yellow card) 39'	Stadium: Riverside Stadium; Attendance: 23,334; Referee: Jeremy Simpson

1 January 2019 26	Derby County	1–1	Middlesbrough	Derby
15:00 GMT	Wilson 2'	Report	Saville (yellow card) 45+5'; Hugill 52'; Bešić (yellow card) 73'	Stadium: Pride Park Stadium; Attendance: 28,123; Referee: Robert Jones

12 January 2019 27	Birmingham City	1–2	Middlesbrough	Birmingham
15:00 GMT	Kieftenbeld (yellow card) 29'; Adams (yellow card) 55' (goal) 79'	Report	Wing 37' (yellow card) 56'; Assombalonga 82'	Stadium: St Andrew's; Attendance: 21,420; Referee: Graham Scott

19 January 2019 28	Middlesbrough	1–1	Millwall	Middlesbrough
15:00 GMT	Howson (yellow card) 20'; Ayala (yellow card) 77'; Hugill 90' (pen.); Batth (yellow card) 90+4'	Report	Wallace 22'; Hutchinson (yellow card) 53'	Stadium: Riverside Stadium; Attendance: 21,915; Referee: Keith Stroud

2 February 2019 29	West Bromwich Albion	2–3	Middlesbrough	West Bromwich
15:00 GMT	Holgate (yellow card) 39'; Rodriguez 42'; Gayle 63'	Report	Saville 17' (yellow card) 36'; Wing (yellow card) 46'; Shotton (yellow card) 55'; Assombalonga 75', 83'; Hugill (yellow card) 90+6'	Stadium: The Hawthorns; Attendance: 24,863; Referee: Tim Robinson

9 February 2019 30	Middlesbrough	1–1	Leeds United	Middlesbrough
12:30 GMT	Wing 47'; Saville (yellow card) 59'; Howson (yellow card) 90+8'	Report	Phillips 90+11'; Jansson (yellow card) 90+13'	Stadium: Riverside Stadium; Attendance: 30,881; Referee: Darren England

13 February 2019 31	Sheffield United	1–0	Middlesbrough	Sheffield
19:45 GMT	Norwood (yellow card) 38'; Stearman 61'; Fleck (yellow card) 76'	Report	Shotton (yellow card) 35'; Ayala (yellow card) 57' (yellow-red card) 64'	Stadium: Bramall Lane; Attendance: 24,805; Referee: Andy Woolmer

17 February 2019 32	Blackburn Rovers	0–1	Middlesbrough	Blackburn
13:00 GMT	Rodwell (yellow card) 33'; Williams (red card) 45'	Report	Assombalonga 19'	Stadium: Ewood Park; Attendance: 13,249; Referee: Darren Bond

23 February 2019 33	Middlesbrough	2–0	Queens Park Rangers	Middlesbrough
15:00 GMT	Howson 2' (yellow card) 63'; Bešić (yellow card) 14'; Fletcher 32'	Report	Cousins (yellow card) 70'	Stadium: Riverside Stadium; Attendance: 22,338; Referee: Andrew Madley

2 March 2019 34	Wigan Athletic	0–0	Middlesbrough	Wigan
15:00 GMT	Dunkley (yellow card) 33'	Report	Ayala (yellow card) 21'; Howson (yellow card) 79'	Stadium: DW Stadium; Attendance: 12,726; Referee: Stephen Martin

9 March 2019 35	Middlesbrough	1–2	Brentford	Middlesbrough
15:00 GMT	Fletcher 6'; Assombalonga (yellow card) 31'; Mikel (yellow card) 38'; Ayala (yellow card) 71'; Hugill (yellow card) 88'; Howson (yellow card) 90+5'	Report	Konsa (yellow card) 67'; Shotton 70' (o.g.); Benrahma 73'	Stadium: Riverside Stadium; Attendance: 22,069; Referee: Jeremy Simpson

13 March 2019 36	Middlesbrough	1–2	Preston North End	Middlesbrough
19:45 GMT	Fletcher 32'; Ayala (red card) 61'	Report	Pearson (yellow card) 55'; Gallagher 63'; Stockley 81'; Hughes (yellow card) 90'	Stadium: Riverside Stadium; Attendance: 21,088; Referee: Keith Stroud

16 March 2019 37	Aston Villa	3–0	Middlesbrough	Birmingham
15:00 GMT	El Ghazi 28'; McGinn 44'; Adomah 88'	Report	Mikel (yellow card) 56'	Stadium: Villa Park; Attendance: 36,263; Referee: Darren Bond

30 March 2019 38	Middlesbrough	0–1	Norwich City	Middlesbrough
17:30 GMT	Ayala (yellow card) 33'; Mikel (yellow card) 49'; Downing (yellow card) 66'	Report	Stiepermann (yellow card) 42'; Zimmermann (yellow card) 48'; Hernández 54' (yellow card) 54'; Trybull (yellow card) 57'	Stadium: Riverside Stadium; Attendance: 23,795; Referee: David Coote

2 April 2019 39	Middlesbrough	0–1	Bristol City	Middlesbrough
19:45 BST	Saville (yellow card) 66'	Report	Webster 31' (yellow card) 49'; Pack (yellow card) 66'; Hunt (yellow card) 86'	Stadium: Riverside Stadium; Attendance: 21,016; Referee: Gavin Ward

6 April 2019 40	Swansea City	3–1	Middlesbrough	Swansea
19:45 BST	Grimes (yellow card) 21' (goal) 34' (pen.); Routledge 38'; Roberts 71'	Report	Saville 81'; Howson (yellow card) 90+3'	Stadium: Liberty Stadium; Attendance: 18,171; Referee: Andy Woolmer

9 April 2019 41	Bolton Wanderers	0–2	Middlesbrough	Bolton
20:00 BST		Report	Fletcher 16', 28'	Stadium: University of Bolton Stadium; Attendance: 12,259; Referee: Stephen Martin

13 April 2019 42	Middlesbrough	1–0	Hull City	Middlesbrough
15:00 BST	Assombalonga 25'; Clayton (yellow card) 90+4'	Report	Henriksen (yellow card) 36'	Stadium: Riverside Stadium; Attendance: 22,427; Referee: Robert Jones

19 April 2019 43	Middlesbrough	1–0	Stoke City	Middlesbrough
15:00 BST	Assombalonga 2'; Clayton (yellow card) 81'	Report	Batth (yellow card) 82'	Stadium: Riverside Stadium; Attendance: 22,890; Referee: Darren Bond

22 April 2019 44	Nottingham Forest	3–0	Middlesbrough	Nottingham
15:00 BST	Lolley 39' (pen.), 85'; Cash (yellow card) 45+1'; Milošević 64'	Report	Shotton (yellow card) 38'	Stadium: City Ground; Attendance: 27,653; Referee: Peter Bankes

27 April 2019 45	Middlesbrough	2–1	Reading	Middlesbrough
15:00 BST	Wing 31'; Assombalonga 39' (pen.); Howson (yellow card) 55'; Saville (yellow card) 90'; Hugill (yellow card) 90+5'	Report	Loader 11'; Harriott (yellow card) 66'	Stadium: Riverside Stadium; Attendance: 22,003; Referee: John Brooks

5 May 2019 46	Rotherham United	1–2	Middlesbrough	Rotherham
12:30 BST	Smith 86' (pen.)	Report	Assombalonga 28' (pen.); Mikel 37' (yellow card) 90+2'	Stadium: New York Stadium; Attendance: 11,051; Referee: Andrew Madley

=== FA Cup ===
The third round draw was made live on BBC by Ruud Gullit and Paul Ince from Stamford Bridge on 3 December 2018. The fourth round draw was made live on BBC by Robbie Keane and Carl Ikeme from Wolverhampton on 7 January 2019.

5 January 2019 Third round	Middlesbrough	5–0	Peterborough United	Middlesbrough
15:00 GMT	Leadbitter (yellow card) 45+1'; Assombalonga 47', 70'; Friend 50'; Wing 62'; Fletcher 87'	Report	White (yellow card) 33'	Stadium: Riverside Stadium; Attendance: 11,647; Referee: James Linington

26 January 2019 Fourth round	Middlesbrough	1–1	Newport County	Middlesbrough
15:00 GMT	Ayala 51'; Fletcher (yellow card) 52'	Report	Dolan 90+3'	Stadium: Riverside Stadium; Attendance: 15,794; Referee: John Brooks

5 February 2019 Fourth round replay	Newport County	2–0	Middlesbrough	Newport
19:45 GMT	Willmott 47'; Amond 67'	Report		Stadium: Rodney Parade; Attendance: 6,552; Referee: Stuart Attwell

=== EFL Cup ===
On 15 June 2018, the draw for the first round was made in Vietnam. The second round draw was made from the Stadium of Light on 16 August. The third round draw was made on 30 August 2018 by David Seaman and Joleon Lescott. The fourth round draw was made live on Quest by Rachel Yankey and Rachel Riley on 29 September. The draw for the quarter-final was made live on Sky Sports by Jamie Redknapp and Jimmy Floyd Hasselbaink on 31 October.

14 August 2018 First round	Middlesbrough	3–3 (4–3 p)	Notts County	Middlesbrough
19:45 BST	Fletcher 28', 74'; Mahmutovic 44'	Report	Crawford 20'; Stead 34', 63'	Stadium: Riverside Stadium; Attendance: 9,942; Referee: Anthony Backhouse

28 August 2018 Second round	Middlesbrough	2–1	Rochdale	Middlesbrough
19:45 BST	Johnson 37'; Hugill 53'	Report	Delaney 83'	Stadium: Riverside Stadium; Attendance: 10,344; Referee: Ben Toner

25 September 2018 Third round	Preston North End	2–2 (3–4 p)	Middlesbrough	Preston
19:45 BST	Robinson 27'; Barkhuizen 66'	Report	Fletcher 34'; Tavernier 69'	Stadium: Deepdale; Attendance: 5,095; Referee: Oliver Langford
	Penalties
	Ledson (penalty scored); Robinson (penalty missed); Moult (penalty scored); Pearson (penalty scored); Burke (penalty missed)		Leadbitter (penalty scored); Gestede (penalty scored); McNair (penalty scored); Tavernier (penalty scored)

31 October 2018 Fourth round	Middlesbrough	1–0	Crystal Palace	Middlesbrough
20:00 GMT	Wing 45+3'	Report		Stadium: Riverside Stadium; Attendance: 11,850; Referee: Paul Tierney

18 December 2018 Quarter-final	Middlesbrough	0–1	Burton Albion	Middlesbrough
19:45 GMT	Hugill (yellow card) 16'; Bešić (yellow card) 38'	Report	Hesketh 48' (yellow card) 74'; Collins (yellow card) 79'	Stadium: Riverside Stadium; Attendance: 17,342; Referee: Michael Oliver

== Transfers ==
=== Transfers in ===
Date from	Position	Nationality	Name	From	Fee	Team	Ref.
1 July 2018	DF	(England)	Harold Essien	Manchester City	Undisclosed	Academy	
1 July 2018	CB	(England)	Aden Flint	Bristol City	£7,000,000	First team	
1 July 2018	CB	(Northern Ireland)	Paddy McNair	Sunderland	£5,000,000	First team	
1 July 2018	CB	(England)	Sam Stubbs	Wigan Athletic	Free	Academy	
4 July 2018	RB	(England)	Djed Spence	Fulham	Free	Academy	
2 August 2018	GK	(England)	Andy Lonergan	Leeds United	Free	First team	
18 August 2018	CM	(England)	Dan Ward	Newcastle United	Free	Academy	
1 January 2019	CM	(Northern Ireland)	George Saville	Millwall	£8,000,000	First team	
24 January 2019	DM	(Nigeria)	John Obi Mikel	(China) Tianjin TEDA	Free	First team	

=== Transfers out ===
Date from	Position	Nationality	Name	To	Fee	Team	Ref.
1 July 2018	RB	(Spain)	Antonio Barragán	(Spain) Real Betis	Undisclosed	First team	
1 July 2018	CB	(England)	Tom Brewitt	AFC Fylde	Released	Academy	
1 July 2018	CM	(England)	Liam Cooke	Free agent	Released	Academy	
1 July 2018	CB	(England)	Martin Cranie	Sheffield United	Released	First team	
1 July 2018	CB	(England)	Matthew Elsdon	Barrow	Free	Academy	
1 July 2018	RB	(Scotland)	Liam Hegarty	Free agent	Released	Academy	
1 July 2018	GK	(England)	Bobby Jones	Wigan Athletic	Undisclosed	Academy	
1 July 2018	GK	(Spain)	Tomás Mejías	(Cyprus) Omonia	Free	First team	
1 July 2018	DM	(Poland)	Jakub Sinior	(Italy) Hellas Verona	Free	Academy	
1 July 2018	RW	(Finland)	Mikael Soisalo	(Belgium) Zulte Waregem	Undisclosed	Academy	
1 July 2018	CB	(England)	Keiran Storey	Free agent	Released	Academy	
1 July 2018	DM	(England)	Robbie Tinkler	Gateshead	Free	Academy	
1 July 2018	CM	(England)	Jay Wilson	Free agent	Released	Academy	
13 July 2018	CM	(Northern Ireland)	Lewis Maloney	Gateshead	Free	Academy	
18 July 2018	LB	(Brazil)	Fábio	(France) Nantes	Undisclosed	First team	
30 July 2018	AM	(England)	Callum Cooke	Peterborough United	Free	Academy	
31 July 2018	CF	(England)	Patrick Bamford	Leeds United	£10,000,000	First team	
5 August 2018	CB	(England)	Ben Gibson	Burnley	£15,000,000	First team	
8 August 2018	RW	(Spain)	Adama Traoré	Wolverhampton Wanderers	£18,000,000	First team	
31 August 2018	DM	(Belgium)	Julien De Sart	(Belgium) Kortrijk	Free transfer	First team	
1 January 2019	LB	(England)	Nathan McGinley	Forest Green Rovers	Undisclosed	Academy	
9 January 2019	GK	(England)	Connor Ripley	Preston North End	Undisclosed	First team	
28 January 2019	RW	(England)	Harry Chapman	Blackburn Rovers	Undisclosed	Academy	
29 January 2019	CM	(England)	Grant Leadbitter	Sunderland	Free transfer	First team	
31 January 2019	CF	(England)	George Miller	Barnsley	Undisclosed	Academy	

=== Loans in ===
Start date	Position	Nationality	Name	From	End date	Team	Ref.
8 August 2018	CF	(England)	Jordan Hugill	West Ham United	31 May 2019	First team	
23 August 2018	DM	(Bosnia and Herzegovina)	Muhamed Bešić	Everton	31 May 2019	First team	
30 August 2018	LM	(England)	Sam McQueen	Southampton	31 May 2019	First team	
31 August 2018	CB	(England)	Danny Batth	Wolverhampton Wanderers	28 January 2019	First team	
31 August 2018	CM	(Northern Ireland)	George Saville	Millwall	31 December 2018	First team	
1 January 2019	LW	(Netherlands)	Rajiv van La Parra	Huddersfield Town	31 May 2019	First team	

=== Loans out ===
Start date	Position	Nationality	Name	To	End date	Team	Ref.
1 July 2018	GK	(England)	Joe Fryer	Carlisle United	31 May 2019	Academy	
9 July 2018	LB	(England)	Hayden Coulson	(Scotland) St Mirren	17 October 2018	Academy	
16 July 2018	CF	(England)	Luke Armstrong	Gateshead	31 December 2018	Academy	
16 July 2018	CF	(England)	George Miller	Bradford City	30 January 2019	Academy	
27 July 2018	GK	(England)	Aynsley Pears	Gateshead	31 May 2019	Academy	
3 August 2018	MF	(England)	Alex Pattison	Yeovil Town	31 May 2019	Academy	
9 August 2018	GK	(England)	Connor Ripley	Accrington Stanley	8 January 2019	First team	
29 August 2018	LB	(England)	Nathan McGinley	Forest Green Rovers	31 December 2018	Academy	
30 August 2018	CB	(Luxembourg)	Enes Mahmutovic	Yeovil Town	1 January 2019	Academy	
31 August 2018	LM	(England)	Marvin Johnson	Sheffield United	31 May 2019	First team	
9 November 2018	CF	(England)	Tyrone O'Neill	Hartlepool United	31 December 2018	Academy	
3 January 2019	CF	(Denmark)	Martin Braithwaite	(Spain) Leganés	31 May 2019	First team	
11 January 2019	CF	(England)	Luke Armstrong	Accrington Stanley	31 May 2019	Academy	
31 January 2019	LB	(England)	Hayden Coulson	Cambridge United	31 May 2019	Academy	
31 January 2019	DM	(England)	Ben Liddle	Forest Green Rovers	31 May 2019	Academy	
31 January 2019	CB	(England)	Sam Stubbs	Notts County	31 May 2019	Academy	
31 January 2019	AM	(England)	Stephen Walker	Milton Keynes Dons	31 May 2019	Academy	
7 February 2019	GK	(England)	Andy Lonergan	Rochdale	21 February 2019	First team	
