= Daniel Ayala =

Spanish footballer (born 1990)

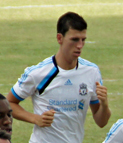
- Ayala training with Liverpool in 2011

Personal information
- Full name: Daniel Sánchez Ayala
- Date of birth: 7 November 1990 (age 35)
- Place of birth: El Saucejo, Spain
- Height: 6 ft 3 in (1.91 m)
- Position: Centre-back

Youth career
- 2000–2007: Sevilla
- 2007–2009: Liverpool

Senior career*
Years	Team	Apps	(Gls)
2009–2011	Liverpool	5	(0)
2010	→ Hull City (loan)	12	(1)
2011	→ Derby County (loan)	17	(0)
2011–2014	Norwich City	7	(0)
2012–2013	→ Nottingham Forest (loan)	12	(1)
2013–2014	→ Middlesbrough (loan)	13	(3)
2014–2020	Middlesbrough	176	(18)
2020–2023	Blackburn Rovers	56	(3)
2023–2024	Rotherham United	7	(0)
2024	Potters Bar Town	0	(0)
Total		305	(26)

International career
2011	Spain U21	1	(0)
- * Club domestic league appearances and goals

Daniel Sánchez Ayala (born 7 November 1990) is a Spanish former professional footballer who played as a centre-back.

His first professional club was Premier League team Liverpool. He signed for Norwich City in 2011, and joined Middlesbrough on loan in October 2013, before joining the club on a permanent deal in January 2014. He joined Blackburn Rovers in 2020, spending three years at the club before a move to Rotherham United.

== Club career ==
=== Liverpool ===
Born in El Saucejo, Seville, Andalusia, Ayala agreed a move to Liverpool in September 2007 after rejecting a professional contract with Sevilla, where he came through the youth team. Liverpool paid a compensation fee to Sevilla and Ayala was offered a three-year contract. In the 2007–08 season he featured predominantly in the Under-18 team, whilst in the 2008–09 season he split his time between the Under-18 and reserve teams. He played through injury in the FA Youth Cup 2008–09 Final defeat to Arsenal.

Ayala made his senior debut on 16 August 2009 in a Premier League match against Tottenham Hotspur, coming on as a substitute for the injured Martin Škrtel and made his first start against Stoke City at Anfield three days later. On Halloween, he came on as a substitute in Liverpool's 3–1 defeat against Fulham at Craven Cottage, after Jamie Carragher and Philipp Degen were sent off. He also played in Liverpool's 4–0 win over Burnley, subsequently relegating them to the Championship, and Liverpool's 2–0 defeat against Chelsea. On 12 November, it was announced that the player had signed an extended contract keeping him at Liverpool until the summer of 2012.

In September 2010, Ayala joined Championship side Hull City on loan. He started the same day in Hull City's away match at Cardiff City which they lost 2–0. In his second match for the club against Derby County he scored his first goal in a competitive match. On 20 September, Liverpool announced that his loan period had been extended until 1 January. Ayala played 12 times for Hull in all competitions, scoring once. On 27 December, he returned to Liverpool due to an injury crisis.

On 11 February 2011, Derby County finally signed Ayala on a loan deal until the end of the season, after the move was delayed due to the players hamstring injury which he picked up while playing for Hull City. He went on to play 17 times for Derby, making 16 consecutive starts.

=== Norwich City ===
On 13 August 2011, Ayala signed for Norwich City for a reported fee of £800,000. The deal officially went through on 16 August 2011. Ayala was handed the number 26 shirt, vacated by Steven Smith and was named in the squad for the Premier League fixture against Stoke City at Carrow Road on 21 August 2011. This was due to Zak Whitbread being rated as doubtful for the fixture after picking up a knee knock against Wigan. He made his debut for Norwich as a second-half substitute for Anthony Pilkington following Leon Barnett's sending off against Stoke.

Ayala suffered a knee injury in the League Cup defeat to Milton Keynes Dons ruling him out for two months. He made his Norwich comeback in the 1–1 draw against Fulham, starting with Zak Whitbread and playing 90 minutes. Ayala was ruled out for a few weeks after suffering a hamstring injury in a 2–0 win over Bolton.

On 7 August 2012, Ayala secured a season-long loan deal with Nottingham Forest. He scored his first goal for the club in a 3–1 home win against Cardiff City.

=== Middlesbrough ===
On 23 October 2013, Ayala joined Championship club Middlesbrough on a three-month emergency loan spell. He made his debut for Middlesbrough two days later, when his new side crushed Doncaster Rovers 4–0, taking the honour of scoring on his debut. He scored his second goal for the club in his third appearance in their 2–2 draw with Watford, where he scored the equaliser in the final minute of added time.

On 24 January 2014, Ayala joined Middlesbrough on a permanent forty-two month contract. Ayala thus became recently appointed manager Aitor Karanka's first permanent signing for Middlesbrough, with the fee reported to be in the region of £350,000.

Ayala departed the club as a free agent following the expiration of his contract on 30 June 2020.

=== Blackburn Rovers ===
On 15 September 2020, Ayala signed for Blackburn Rovers on a 3-year deal. Ayala made his debut for Blackburn in their 0–0 draw with Cardiff City on 3 October. Ayala scored his first goal for Blackburn in the club's 2–1 win against Nottingham Forest on 18 August 2021.

=== Rotherham United ===
On 27 October 2023, Ayala signed for EFL Championship side Rotherham United on a short-term deal. On 7 March 2024, Ayala was released from the club by mutual consent.

=== Potters Bar Town ===
On 22 October 2024, Ayala played for Potters Bar Town in an Alan Turvey Trophy loss against Cheshunt.

== Career statistics ==
Club	Season	League			FA Cup		League Cup		Europe		Total	
Club	Season	Division	Apps	Goals	Apps	Goals	Apps	Goals	Apps	Goals	Apps	Goals
Liverpool	2009–10	Premier League	5	0	0	0	0	0	0	0	5	0
Liverpool	2010–11	Premier League	0	0	0	0	0	0	0	0	0	0
Liverpool	Total		5	0	0	0	0	0	0	0	5	0
Hull City (loan)	2010–11	Championship	12	1	0	0	0	0	—		12	1
Derby County (loan)	2010–11	Championship	17	0	0	0	0	0	—		17	0
Norwich City	2011–12	Premier League	7	0	2	0	1	0	—		10	0
Norwich City	2012–13	Premier League	0	0	0	0	0	0	—		0	0
Norwich City	2013–14	Premier League	0	0	0	0	0	0	—		0	0
Norwich City	Total		7	0	2	0	1	0	—		10	0
Nottingham Forest (loan)	2012–13	Championship	12	1	0	0	2	0	—		14	1
Middlesbrough	2013–14	Championship	32	6	0	0	0	0	—		32	6
Middlesbrough	2014–15	Championship	33	4	2	1	3	0	—		38	5
Middlesbrough	2015–16	Championship	35	3	1	0	3	0	—		39	3
Middlesbrough	2016–17	Premier League	14	1	2	0	1	0	—		17	1
Middlesbrough	2017–18	Championship	34	7	2	0	3	0	—		39	7
Middlesbrough	2018–19	Championship	33	1	3	1	3	0	—		39	2
Middlesbrough	2019–20	Championship	25	2	0	0	0	0	—		25	2
Middlesbrough	Total		206	21	10	2	13	0	—		229	26
Blackburn Rovers	2020–21	Championship	10	0	0	0	0	0	—		10	0
Blackburn Rovers	2021–22	Championship	21	2	1	1	0	0	—		22	3
Blackburn Rovers	2022–23	Championship	25	1	1	0	0	0	—		26	1
Blackburn Rovers	Total		56	3	2	1	0	0	—		58	4
Rotherham United	2023–24	Championship	7	0	0	0	—		—		7	0
Career total			322	26	14	3	14	0	0	0	350	29

== Honours ==
Middlesbrough

- Football League Championship runner-up: 2015–16

Individual

- The Football League Team of the Season: 2015–16
- PFA Team of the Year: 2015–16 Championship
- PFA Fans' Player of the Year: 2015–16 Championship
