= Abdoulaye Kanté (footballer, born 2005) =

Ivorian footballer (born 2005)

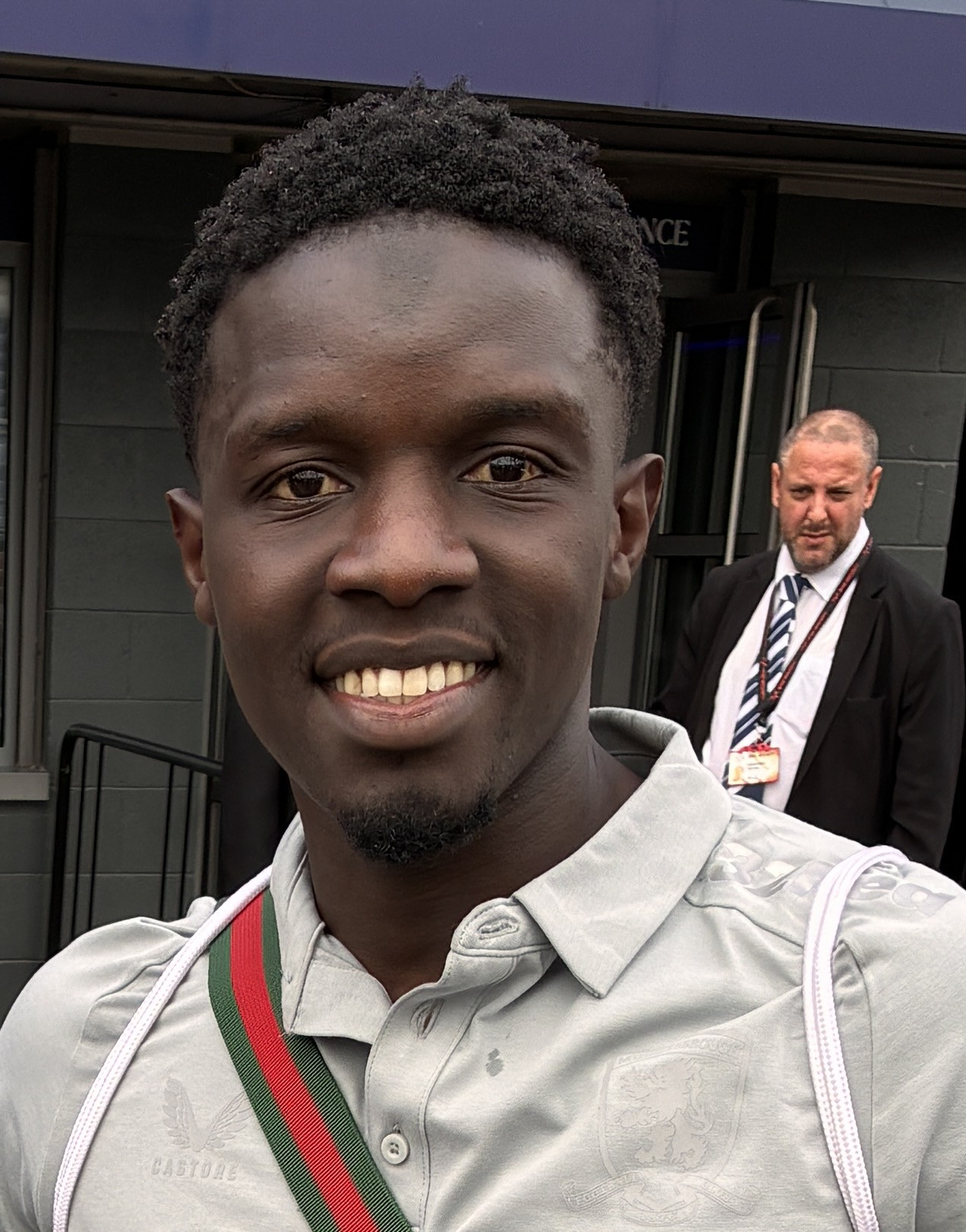
- Kanté in 2025

Personal information
- Full name: Abdoulaye Raslan Kanté
- Date of birth: 9 July 2005 (age 21)
- Place of birth: Attécoubé, Ivory Coast
- Height: 1.80 m (5 ft 11 in)
- Position: Midfielder

Team information
- Current team: Al-Ettifaq
- Number: 42

Youth career
- –2022: Montfermeil

Senior career*
Years	Team	Apps	(Gls)
2022–2023	Troyes B	4	(0)
2023–2025	Troyes	47	(1)
2025–2026	Middlesbrough	5	(0)
2026	→ Saint-Étienne (loan)	13	(0)
2026–	Al-Ettifaq	7	(0)

International career^{‡}
2026–	Ivory Coast U23	1	(0)
- * Club domestic league appearances and goals as of 5 November 2026 ‡ National team caps and goals as of 15:03, 27 March 2026 (UTC)

Abdoulaye Raslan Kanté (born 9 July 2005) is an Ivorian professional footballer who plays as a midfielder for Saudi Pro League club Al-Ettifaq.

== Career ==
As a youth player, Kanté joined the youth academy of French side Montfermeil. Following his stint there, he signed for the reserve team of French Ligue 1 side Troyes ahead of the 2022–23 season and was promoted to the club's senior team in 2023, where he made forty-seven league appearances and scored one goal. French newspaper L'Est éclair wrote in 2024 that he "made himself indispensable" while playing for them.

On 29 July 2025, Kanté signed for English Championship club Middlesbrough for an undisclosed fee signing a five-and-a-half year deal.

On 30 January 2026, Kanté joined Ligue 2 club Saint-Étienne on loan until the end of the season, with an option to buy.

On 30 August 2026, Kanté signed for Saudi Pro League club Al-Ettifaq for an undisclosed fee.

== International career ==
Kanté was called up to the Ivory Coast U23s for a set of friendlies in March 2026.

== Personal life ==
Kanté holds French citizenship.

== Style of play ==
Kanté plays as a midfielder. Right-footed, he is known for his skills in tackling and interception.

== Career statistics ==
As of match played 15 August 2026

Appearances and goals by club, season and competition
Club	Season	League			National cup (Note: Includes Coupe de France and FA Cup)		League cup (Note: Includes EFL Cup)		Other		Total	
Club	Season	Division	Apps	Goals	Apps	Goals	Apps	Goals	Apps	Goals	Apps	Goals
Troyes	2023–24	Ligue 2	18	0	0	0	—		—		18	0
Troyes	2024–25	Ligue 2	29	0	3	0	—		—		32	0
Troyes	Total		47	0	3	0	—		—		50	0
Middlesbrough	2025–26	Championship	4	0	0	0	1	0	—		5	0
Middlesbrough	2026–27	Championship	1	0	—		0	0	—		1	0
Middlesbrough	Total		5	0	0	0	1	0	—		6	0
Saint-Étienne (loan)	2025–26	Ligue 2	13	0	0	0	—		3 (Note: Appearances in Ligue 1/2 promotion/relegation play-offs)	0	16	0
Al-Ettifaq	2026–27	Saudi Pro League	0	0	0	0	—		—		0	0
Career total			65	0	3	0	1	0	3	0	72	0
