= 2016–17 Middlesbrough F.C. season =

Middlesbrough
2016–17 season
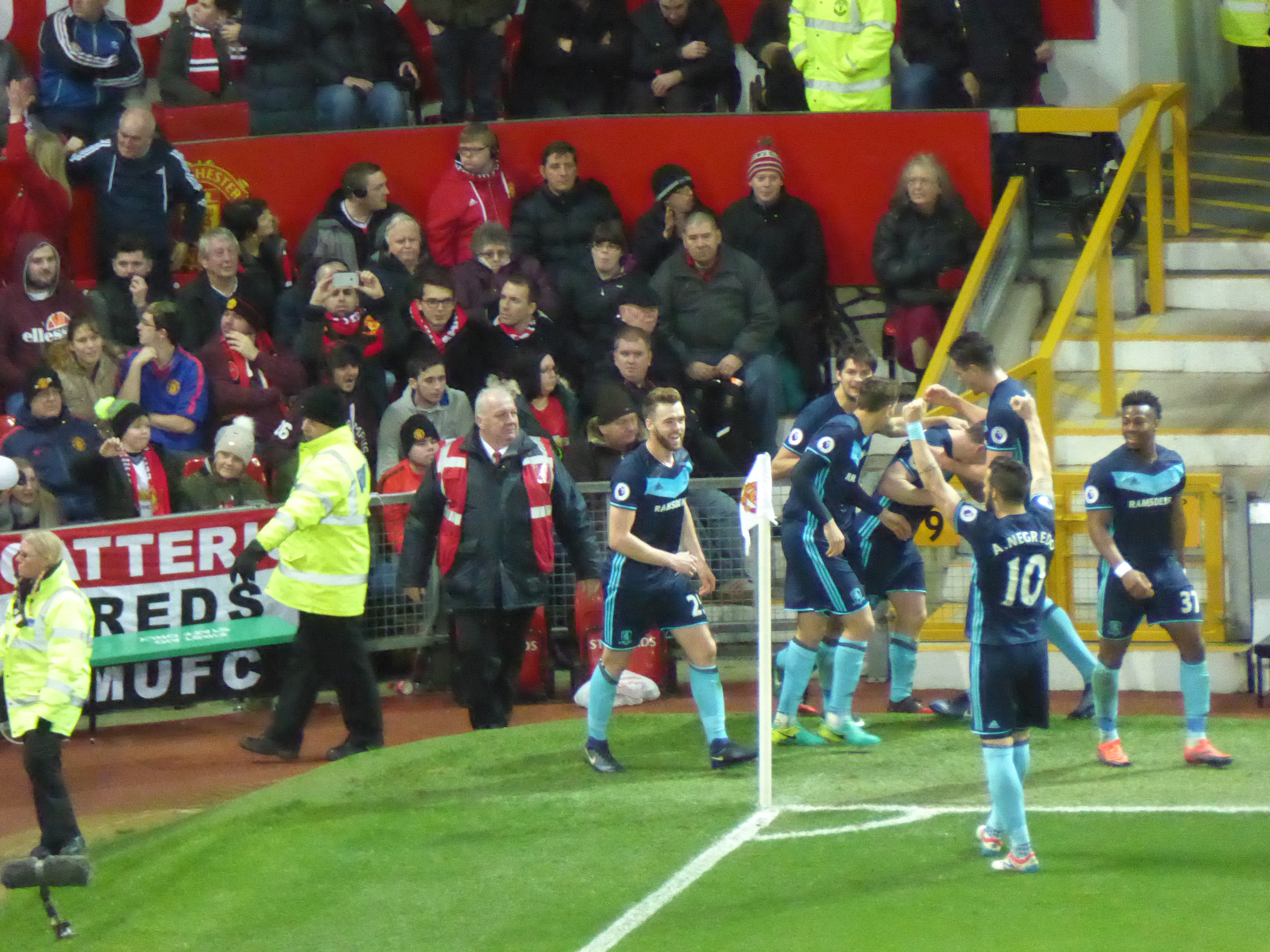
- Middlesbrough celebrate taking the lead at Old Trafford in December 2016; Manchester United would win the match 2–1
- Chairman: Steve Gibson
- Manager: Aitor Karanka (until 16 March 2017); Steve Agnew (caretaker) (from 16 March 2017)
- Stadium: Riverside Stadium
- Premier League: 19th (relegated)
- FA Cup: Quarter-finals
- League Cup: Second round
- Top goalscorer: League: Álvaro Negredo (9); All: Álvaro Negredo (10)
- Highest home attendance: 32,704 Middlesbrough 0–1 Chelsea Middlesbrough 0–3 Liverpool
- Lowest home attendance: 23,661 Middlesbrough 3–0 Sheffield Wednesday
- Average home league attendance: 30,449 (Premier League)
Home colours	Away colours	Third colours

The 2016–17 season was Middlesbrough's fifteenth season in the Premier League, their first since relegation in the 2008–09 season, after gaining promotion the previous season in their 141st year in existence. Along with the Premier League, the club also competed in the FA Cup and EFL Cup. The season covered the period from 1 July 2016 to 30 June 2017.

Middlesbrough's long-awaited return to the top flight proved to be disastrous, as the team struggled to score goals all season, despite boasting a strong defensive record compared to other teams in the bottom half of the table. Their total of 27 goals scored throughout the season was the lowest in the Premier League, leading to manager Aitor Karanka's dismissal in March. Caretaker manager Steve Agnew could not improve the team's fortunes as they were relegated back to the Championship on 8 May 2017 following their 3–0 away defeat to Chelsea, who would go on to become champions.

== Squad ==
=== First team squad ===
As of 2 February 2017.

Squad No.	Name	Nationality	Position(s)	Date of birth (age)	Previous team
Goalkeepers
1	Dimitrios Konstantopoulos	(Greece)	GK	29 November 1978 (aged 38)	(Greece) AEK Athens
12	Brad Guzan	(United States)	GK	9 September 1984 (aged 32)	(England) Aston Villa
26	Victor Valdes	(Spain)	GK	14 January 1982 (aged 35)	(England) Manchester United
Defenders
2	Fábio	(Brazil)	FB	9 July 1990 (aged 26)	(Wales) Cardiff City
3	George Friend	(England)	LB	17 October 1987 (aged 29)	(England) Doncaster Rovers
4	Daniel Ayala	(Spain)	CB	7 November 1990 (aged 26)	(England) Norwich City
5	Bernardo Espinosa	(Colombia)	CB	11 July 1989 (aged 27)	(Spain) Sporting Gijón
6	Ben Gibson	(England)	CB	15 January 1993 (aged 24)	Academy
17	Antonio Barragán	(Spain)	RB	12 June 1987 (aged 30)	(Spain) Valencia
22	Dael Fry	(England)	CB	30 August 1997 (aged 19)	Academy
25	Calum Chambers L	(England)	RB / CB	20 January 1995 (aged 22)	(England) Arsenal
40	James Husband	(England)	LB	3 January 1994 (aged 23)	(England) Doncaster Rovers
-	Jordan McGhee L	(Scotland)	RB	24 July 1996 (aged 20)	(Scotland) Hearts
-	Nathan McGinley	(England)	LB	15 September 1996 (aged 20)	Academy
Midfielders
7	Grant Leadbitter	(England)	DM / CM	7 January 1986 (aged 31)	(England) Ipswich Town
8	Adam Clayton	(England)	DM / CM	14 January 1989 (aged 28)	(England) Huddersfield Town
14	Marten de Roon	(Netherlands)	DM / CM	29 March 1991 (aged 26)	(Italy) Atalanta
18	Cristhian Stuani	(Uruguay)	RM / CF	12 October 1986 (aged 30)	(Spain) Espanyol
19	Stewart Downing	(England)	AM / LM / RM	22 July 1984 (aged 32)	(England) West Ham United
21	Gastón Ramírez	(Uruguay)	AM	2 December 1990 (aged 26)	(England) Southampton
27	Adlène Guedioura	(Algeria)	CM	12 November 1985 (aged 31)	(England) Watford
34	Adam Forshaw	(England)	CM / DM	8 October 1991 (aged 25)	(England) Wigan Athletic
-	Alex Pattison	(England)	AM	6 September 1997 (aged 19)	Academy
-	Lewis Maloney	(Northern Ireland)	CM	5 May 1995 (aged 22)	Academy
Strikers
10	Álvaro Negredo L	(Spain)	CF	20 August 1985 (aged 31)	(Spain) Valencia
11	Viktor Fischer	(Denmark)	LW	9 June 1994 (aged 23)	(Netherlands) Ajax
20	Patrick Bamford	(England)	CF	5 September 1993 (aged 23)	(England) Chelsea
29	Rudy Gestede	(Benin)	FW	10 October 1988 (aged 28)	(England) Aston Villa
37	Adama Traoré	(Spain)	RW	25 January 1996 (aged 21)	(England) Aston Villa

- L = Player on Loan

== Transfers ==
=== Transfers in ===
Date from	Position	Nationality	Name	From	Fee	Ref.
1 July 2016	DF	COL	Bernardo Espinosa	(Spain) Sporting Gijón	Free	
1 July 2016	FW	DEN	Viktor Fischer	(Netherlands) Ajax	£3,800,000	
4 July 2016	MF	NED	Marten de Roon	(Italy) Atalanta	£12,000,000	
7 July 2016	GK	ESP	Víctor Valdés	Manchester United	Free	
15 July 2016	DF	ESP	Antonio Barragán	(Spain) Valencia	£3,000,000	
18 July 2016	MF	URU	Gastón Ramírez	Southampton	Free	
29 July 2016	GK	USA	Brad Guzan	Aston Villa	Free	
12 August 2016	DF	BRA	Fábio	Cardiff City	£2,000,000	
31 August 2016	FW	MLI	Adama Traoré	Aston Villa	£7,500,000	
4 January 2017	FW	BEN	Rudy Gestede	Aston Villa	£6,000,000	
5 January 2017	FW	FIN	Mikael Soisalo	(Finland) Ilves	Undisclosed	
18 January 2017	FW	ENG	Patrick Bamford	Chelsea	£6,000,000	
31 January 2017	MF	ALG	Adlène Guedioura	Watford	£4,500,000	
2 February 2017	MF	GHA	William Opoku Asiedu	(Ghana) Okyeman Planners	Free	

Total spending ▼£20,800,000

=== Loans in ===
Date from	Position	Nationality	Name	From	Date until	Ref.
5 July 2016	DF	SCO	Jordan McGhee	(Scotland) Hearts	End of season	
20 July 2016	FW	ESP	Álvaro Negredo	(Spain) Valencia	End of season	
30 August 2016	DF	ENG	Calum Chambers	(England) Arsenal	End of season	
2 February 2017	DF	ARG	Pedro Silva Torrejón	(Argentina) Boca Juniors	End of season	

=== Loans out ===
Date from	Position	Nationality	Name	To	Date until	Ref.
1 July 2016	DF	ENG	Jonny Burn	(Scotland) Kilmarnock	4 January 2017	
9 July 2016	GK	ENG	Connor Ripley	(England) Oldham Athletic	End of season	
12 August 2016	MF	ENG	Harry Chapman	(England) Sheffield United	End of season	
30 August 2016	FW	ENG	Bradley Fewster	(England) Hartlepool United	End of season	
31 August 2016	DF	ENG	Alex Baptiste	(England) Preston North End	End of season	
31 August 2016	DF	ENG	Dael Fry	(England) Rotherham United	4 January 2017 (Note: On 4 January 2017, Dael Fry was recalled from his loan at Rotherham United.)	
5 January 2017	MF	BEL	Julien De Sart	(England) Derby County	End of season	
5 January 2017	GK	ESP	Tomás Mejías	(Spain) Rayo Vallecano	End of season	
26 January 2017	GK	ENG	Joseph Fryer	(England) Hartlepool United	End of season	
27 January 2017	DF	ENG	Mark Kitching	(England) Rochdale	31 January 2017 (Note: On 31 January 2017, Mark Kitching's loan was made permanent.)	
31 January 2017	MF	ENG	Harry Chapman	(England) Sheffield United	End of season	
31 January 2017	MF	ENG	Callum Cooke	(England) Crewe Alexandra	End of season	
31 January 2017	MF	URU	Carlos de Pena	(Spain) Real Oviedo	End of season	
1 February 2017	FW	SCO	Jordan Rhodes	(England) Sheffield Wednesday	End of season	
2 February 2017	MF	GHA	William Opoku Asiedu	(Estonia) Levadia	End of next season	
2 February 2017	MF	ENG	Robbie Tinkler	(England) North Ferriby United	End of season	

=== Transfers out ===
Date from	Position	Nationality	Name	To	Fee	Ref.
1 July 2016	DF	ESP	Damià Abella	Retired	Released	
1 July 2016	DF	ENG	Jonathan Woodgate	Retired	Released	
1 July 2016	DF	AUS	Rhys Williams	(Australia) Perth Glory	Free	
1 July 2016	GK	ENG	Luke Coddington	(England) Huddersfield Town	Free	
1 July 2016	MF	ENG	Jordan Jones	(Scotland) Kilmarnock	Free	
1 July 2016	DF	ENG	Andre Bennett	(England) Bishop Auckland	Free	
30 August 2016	DF	ENG	Adam Jackson	(England) Barnsley	Undisclosed	
30 August 2016	DF	ENG	Brad Halliday	(England) Cambridge United	Undisclosed	
31 August 2016	MF	GMB	Mustapha Carayol	(England) Nottingham Forest	Free	
31 August 2016	MF	GHA	Albert Adomah	(England) Aston Villa	Undisclosed	
31 August 2016	MF	ENG	Adam Reach	(England) Sheffield Wednesday	£5,000,000	
9 January 2017	FW	ENG	David Nugent	(England) Derby County	Undisclosed (Note: Fee Reported as £2,500,000)	
18 January 2017	DF	EQG	Emilio Nsue	(England) Birmingham City	Undisclosed	
20 January 2017	MF	ENG	Bryn Morris	(England) Shrewsbury Town	Undisclosed	
26 January 2017	DF	ENG	Jonny Burn	(England) Bristol Rovers	Undisclosed	
31 January 2017	FW	AUT	Arnel Jakupovic	(Italy) Empoli	Undisclosed	
31 January 2017	DF	ENG	Mark Kitching	(England) Rochdale	Undisclosed	
1 February 2017	FW	SCO	Jordan Rhodes	(England) Sheffield Wednesday	Undisclosed	

== New contracts ==
No.	Pos	Player	Contract length	Contract end	Date	Source
4	CB	(Spain) Daniel Ayala	4 years	2020	5 August 2016	
3	LB	(England) George Friend	4 years	2020	13 August 2016	
6	CB	(England) Ben Gibson	5 years	2021	20 August 2016	
34	CM	(England) Adam Forshaw	4 years	2020	26 August 2016	
22	CB	(England) Dael Fry	5 years	2021	31 August 2016	

== Competitions ==
=== Overview ===
Competition	Record							
Competition	G	W	D	L	GF	GA	GD	Win %
Premier League	38	5	13	20	27	53	−26	13.16
FA Cup	4	3	0	1	7	4	+3	75.00
League Cup	1	0	0	1	1	2	−1	0.00
Total	43	8	13	22	35	59	−24	18.60

Updated to match played 8 May 2017
Source: Competitions

=== Pre-season friendlies ===
Win Draw Loss

9 July 2016 Friendly	York City	0–6	Middlesbrough	York
12:30 PM BST		Report	Flinders 19' (o.g.); Nugent 23'; Adomah 33'; Rhodes 63', 87'; Reach 75'	Stadium: Bootham Crescent; Attendance: 2,812 (2,000 Boro – approx)

16 July 2016 Friendly	Doncaster Rovers	0–2	Middlesbrough	Doncaster
3:00 PM BST		Report	Downing 13'; Pattison 82'	Stadium: Keepmoat Stadium; Attendance: 2,886 (1,118 Boro); Referee: Darren England

19 July 2016 Friendly	Real Betis	2–1	Middlesbrough	Marbella
8:00 PM WET	Ceballos 26'; Castro 72'	Report	Rhodes 74'	Stadium: Estadio Municipal de Marbella

23 July 2016 Friendly	Alcorcón	2–2	Middlesbrough	Marbella
6:30 PM WET	Bautista Romagnoli 55'; Alejo 90'	Report	Negredo 34'; Rhodes 90'	Stadium: Estadio Municipal de Marbella

25 July 2016 Friendly	Al-Ahli	0–2	Middlesbrough	Marbella
11:00 PM WET		Report	Nugent 58'; De Sart 68'	Stadium: Estadio Municipal de Marbella

30 July 2016 Friendly	Aston Villa	1–3	Middlesbrough	Birmingham
3:00 PM BST	Baker 14'	Report	Negredo; Fischer; Rhodes	Stadium: Villa Park; Attendance: 14,863 (869 Boro); Referee: Steve Martin

3 August 2016 Friendly	Udinese	0–0	Middlesbrough	Udine
8:30 PM BST		Report		Stadium: Stadio Friuli

6 August 2016 Friendly	Middlesbrough	0–0	Real Sociedad	Middlesbrough
3:00 PM BST		Report		Stadium: Riverside Stadium; Attendance: 9,726; Referee: Neil Swarbrick

=== Premier League ===
==== Matches ====
Win Draw Loss

13 August 2016 1	Middlesbrough	1–1	Stoke City	Middlesbrough
15:00 BST	Negredo 11'; Downing (yellow card) 29'; Ramírez (yellow card) 30'; Forshaw (yellow card) 90'	Report	Shaqiri 67'; Shawcross (yellow card) 22'; Given (yellow card) 30'; Bardsley (yellow card) 48'; Wollscheid (yellow card) 90'; Arnautović (yellow card) 90+3'	Stadium: Riverside Stadium; Attendance: 32,110; Referee: Kevin Friend

21 August 2016 2	Sunderland	1–2	Middlesbrough	Sunderland
13:30 BST	Van Aanholt 71'; Gooch (yellow card) 81'	Report	Stuani 13', 46'; Clayton (yellow card) 26'	Stadium: Stadium of Light; Attendance: 43,515; Referee: Martin Atkinson

28 August 2016 3	West Bromwich Albion	0–0	Middlesbrough	West Bromwich
13:30 BST	Yacob (yellow card) 65'	Report	Ayala (yellow card) 1'; Ramírez (yellow card) 49'; Barragán (yellow card) 77'	Stadium: The Hawthorns; Attendance: 23,690; Referee: Anthony Taylor

10 September 2016 4	Middlesbrough	1–2	Crystal Palace	Middlesbrough
15:00 BST	Ayala 38'; Ramírez (yellow card) 60'	Report	Benteke 15'; Zaha 47'; Ward (yellow card) 82'; Zaha (yellow card) 90'	Stadium: Riverside Stadium; Attendance: 30,551; Referee: Neil Swarbrick

17 September 2016 5	Everton	3–1	Middlesbrough	Liverpool
17:30 BST	Stekelenburg (yellow card) 22'; Barry 24', (yellow card) 45'; Coleman 42'; Lukaku 45'	Report	Stekelenburg 21' (o.g.); Ayala (yellow card) 37'	Stadium: Goodison Park; Attendance: 39,074; Referee: Lee Mason

24 September 2016 6	Middlesbrough	1–2	Tottenham Hotspur	Middlesbrough
15:00 BST	Gibson 65'; Traoré (yellow card) 87'; Friend (yellow card) 90'	Report	Son 7', 23'; Walker (yellow card) 63'	Stadium: Riverside Stadium; Attendance: 32,703; Referee: Graham Scott

1 October 2016 7	West Ham United	1–1	Middlesbrough	Stratford, London
15:00 BST	Obiang (yellow card) 11'; Payet 57'; Arbeloa (yellow card) 90'	Report	Stuani 51', (yellow card) 80'; De Roon (yellow card) 62'; Barragán (yellow card) 88'	Stadium: Olympic Stadium; Attendance: 56,945; Referee: Neil Swarbrick

15 October 2016 8	Middlesbrough	0–1	Watford	Middlesbrough
12:30 BST	Barragán (yellow card) 21'; Stuani (yellow card) 38'; Ramírez (yellow card) 42'; De Roon (yellow card) 74'	Report	Holebas 54'; Amrabat (yellow card) 65'	Stadium: Riverside Stadium; Attendance: 28,131; Referee: Roger East

22 October 2016 9	Arsenal	0–0	Middlesbrough	Holloway, London
15:00 BST	Mustafi (yellow card) 64'	Report		Stadium: Emirates Stadium; Attendance: 59,962; Referee: Mike Dean

29 October 2016 10	Middlesbrough	2–0	AFC Bournemouth	Middlesbrough
15:00 BST	Ramírez (yellow card) 24', (goal) 39'; Downing 56'; Chambers (yellow card) 90+2'	Report	Smith (yellow card) 25'	Stadium: Riverside Stadium; Attendance: 29,600; Referee: Stuart Attwell

5 November 2016 11	Manchester City	1–1	Middlesbrough	Manchester
15:00 BST	Agüero 43', (yellow card) 88'	Report	Forshaw (yellow card) 20'; Clayton (yellow card) 52'; De Roon (yellow card) 89', (goal) 90+1'	Stadium: City of Manchester Stadium; Attendance: 54,294; Referee: Kevin Friend

20 November 2016 12	Middlesbrough	0–1	Chelsea	Middlesbrough
16:00 BST	Clayton (yellow card) 8'; Chambers (yellow card) 74'	Report	Costa 41'; Azpilicueta (yellow card) 51'; David Luiz (yellow card) 64'; Kanté (yellow card) 73'	Stadium: Riverside Stadium; Attendance: 32,704; Referee: Jonathan Moss

26 November 2016 13	Leicester City	2–2	Middlesbrough	Leicester
15:00 BST	Albrighton (yellow card) 29'; Mahrez 34' (pen.); Amartey (yellow card) 51'; Vardy (yellow card) 65'; Slimani 90+4' (pen.)	Report	Negredo 13', 71', (yellow card) 34'; Chambers (yellow card) 31'; Valdés (yellow card) 90+2'; De Roon (yellow card) 90+3'	Stadium: King Power Stadium; Attendance: 32,058; Referee: Lee Mason

5 December 2016 14	Middlesbrough	1–0	Hull City	Middlesbrough
20:00 BST	Ramírez 60'; Fábio (yellow card) 72'	Report	Livermore (yellow card) 15'	Stadium: Riverside Stadium; Attendance: 27,395; Referee: Mike Dean

11 December 2016 15	Southampton	1–0	Middlesbrough	Southampton
14:15 GMT	Tadić (yellow card) 22'; Boufal (yellow card) 45+1', (goal) 53'; Fonte (yellow card) 55'; Romeu (yellow card) 58'	Report	Barragán (yellow card) 17'; Forshaw (yellow card) 52'; Clayton (yellow card) 80'	Stadium: St Mary's Stadium; Attendance: 28,976; Referee: Stuart Attwell

14 December 2016 16	Middlesbrough	0–3	Liverpool	Middlesbrough
19:45 GMT	Gibson (yellow card) 69'	Report	Lallana 29', 68'; Origi 60'	Stadium: Riverside Stadium; Attendance: 32,704; Referee: Jonathan Moss

17 December 2016 17	Middlesbrough	3–0	Swansea City	Middlesbrough
15:00 BST	Negredo 18', 29', (yellow card) 90'; De Roon 58'	Report		Stadium: Riverside Stadium; Attendance: 28,302; Referee: Neil Swarbrick

26 December 2016 18	Burnley	1–0	Middlesbrough	Burnley
15:00 BST	Boyd (yellow card) 21'; Mee (yellow card) 42'; Flanagan (yellow card) 53'; Ward (yellow card) 65'; Gray (yellow card) 73', (goal) 80'; Hendrick (yellow card) 85'	Report	De Roon (yellow card) 2'; Ramírez (yellow card) 31'; Barragán (yellow card) 45+2'; Fábio (yellow card) 80'; Negredo (yellow card) 90+4'	Stadium: Turf Moor; Attendance: 21,562; Referee: Craig Pawson

31 December 2016 19	Manchester United	2–1	Middlesbrough	Trafford, Manchester
15:00 BST	Blind (yellow card) 57'; Martial 85'; Pogba 86'	Report	Leadbitter 67'; Chambers (yellow card) 90+2'	Stadium: Old Trafford; Attendance: 75,314; Referee: Lee Mason

2 January 2017 20	Middlesbrough	0–0	Leicester City	Middlesbrough
12:30 GMT	Ramírez (yellow card) 26'; Gibson (yellow card) 43'; Clayton (yellow card) 90+1'	Report		Stadium: Riverside Stadium; Attendance: 32,437; Referee: Robert Madley

14 January 2017 21	Watford	0–0	Middlesbrough	Watford
15:00 BST		Report		Stadium: Vicarage Road

21 January 2017 22	Middlesbrough	1–3	West Ham	Middlesbrough
15:00 BST	Stuani 27'; Gibson (yellow card) 80'; Bernardo (yellow card) 83'	Report	Lanzini (yellow card) 6'; Carroll 9', 43'; Calleri 90+4'	Stadium: Riverside Stadium; Attendance: 30,848; Referee: Martin Atkinson

31 January 2017 23	Middlesbrough	1–1	West Bromwich Albion	Middlesbrough
19:45 BST	Negredo 17' (pen.), (yellow card) 51'; Bernardo (yellow card) 45'	Report	Morrison 6'; Dawson (yellow card) 89'	Stadium: Riverside Stadium; Attendance: 27,316; Referee: Stuart Attwell

4 February 2017 24	Tottenham Hotspur	1–0	Middlesbrough	Tottenham, London
17:30 GMT	Kane 58' (pen.)	Report	De Roon (yellow card) 38'	Stadium: White Hart Lane; Attendance: 31,949; Referee: Mark Clattenburg

11 February 2017 25	Middlesbrough	0–0	Everton	Middlesbrough
17:30 GMT	Clayton (yellow card) 31'; Ramírez (yellow card) 85'	Report		Stadium: Riverside; Attendance: 31,496; Referee: Mike Dean

25 February 2017 26	Crystal Palace	1–0	Middlesbrough	South Norwood, London
15:00 GMT	Cabaye (yellow card) 30'; Van Aanholt 34'; McArthur (yellow card) 76'; Ward (yellow card) 83'	Report	Fábio (yellow card) 75'	Stadium: Selhurst Park; Attendance: 25,416; Referee: Robert Madley

4 March 2017 27	Stoke City	2–0	Middlesbrough	Stoke-on-Trent
15:00 GMT	Shawcross (yellow card) 21'; Arnautović 29', 43'	Report	Friend (yellow card) 45+2'; De Roon (yellow card) 78'	Stadium: Britannia Stadium; Attendance: 27,644; Referee: Craig Pawson

19 March 2017 28	Middlesbrough	1–3	Manchester United	Middlesbrough
12:30 GMT	Clayton (yellow card) 33'; Gestede 77'	Report	Jones (yellow card) 25'; Fellaini 30'; Lingard 62'; Valencia 90+3'	Stadium: Riverside; Attendance: 32,689; Referee: Jonathan Moss

2 April 2017 29	Swansea City	0–0	Middlesbrough	Swansea
13:30 BST	Fer (yellow card) 16'; Mawson (yellow card) 58'	Report	Fábio (yellow card) 23'; Negredo (yellow card) 69'; Gestede (yellow card) 79'	Stadium: Liberty Stadium; Attendance: 20,354; Referee: Bobby Madley

5 April 2017 30	Hull City	4–2	Middlesbrough	Kingston upon Hull
19:45 BST	Marković 14'; Clucas (yellow card) 19'; Niasse 27'; Hernández 33'; Maguire 70'; N'Diaye (yellow card) 85'	Report	Negredo 5'; Clayton (yellow card) 21'; De Roon 45+1'	Stadium: KCOM Stadium; Attendance: 20,380; Referee: Michael Oliver

8 April 2017 31	Middlesbrough	0–0	Burnley	Middlesbrough
15:00 BST		Report	Ward (yellow card) 45+1'; Barnes (yellow card) 48'; Keane (yellow card) 85'	Stadium: Riverside Stadium; Attendance: 29,547; Referee: Martin Atkinson

17 April 2017 32	Middlesbrough	1–2	Arsenal	Middlesbrough
20:00 BST	Leadbitter (yellow card) 7'; Negredo 50'; Gestede (yellow card) 82'	Report	Oxlade-Chamberlain (yellow card) 4'; Sánchez 42'; Gabriel (yellow card) 43'; Özil 71'	Stadium: Riverside Stadium; Attendance: 31,298; Referee: Anthony Taylor

23 April 2017 33	AFC Bournemouth	4–0	Middlesbrough	Bournemouth
15:00	King 2'; Afobe 16'; Pugh 65'; Daniels 70'	Report	Ramírez (yellow card) 14' (yellow-red card) 20'; Friend (yellow card) 58'; Ayala (yellow card) 67'	Stadium: Dean Court; Attendance: 10,890; Referee: Graham Scott

26 April 2017 34	Middlesbrough	1–0	Sunderland	Middlesbrough
19:45 BST	De Roon 9'; Friend (yellow card) 29'; Clayton (yellow card) 31'; Fábio (yellow card) 71'	Report	O'Shea (yellow card) 37'; Gibson (yellow card) 45+2'; Jones (yellow card) 75'	Stadium: Riverside Stadium; Attendance: 30,742; Referee: Mike Dean

30 April 2017 35	Middlesbrough	2–2	Manchester City	Middlesbrough
14:05 BST	Stuani (yellow card) 16'; Negredo 38'; Forshaw (yellow card) 54'; Fábio (yellow card) 67'; De Roon (yellow card) 68'; Chambers 78'	Report	Kompany (yellow card) 31'; Sané (yellow card) 68'; Agüero 69' (pen.); Otamendi (yellow card) 76'; Sterling (yellow card) 81'; Jesus 85'	Stadium: Riverside Stadium; Attendance: 29,763; Referee: Kevin Friend

8 May 2017 36	Chelsea	3–0	Middlesbrough	Fulham, London
20:00 BST	Costa 23'; Alonso 34'; Matić 65'	Report	Fábio (yellow card) 60'; Bamford (yellow card) 89'	Stadium: Stamford Bridge; Attendance: 41,500; Referee: Craig Pawson

13 May 2017 37	Middlesbrough	1–2	Southampton	Middlesbrough
15:00 BST	Clayton (yellow card) 66'; Bamford 72'; Gibson (yellow card) 86' de Roon (yellow card) 90'	Report	Rodriguez 42'; Redmond 57'	Stadium: Riverside Stadium; Attendance: 28,203; Referee: Anthony Taylor

21 May 2017 38	Liverpool	3–0	Middlesbrough	Liverpool
15:00 BST	Wijnaldum 45+1'; Coutinho 51'; Lallana 56'	Report	Gestede (yellow card) 66'	Stadium: Anfield; Attendance: 53,191; Referee: Martin Atkinson

==== Results by matchday ====
Matchday	1	2	3	4	5	6	7	8	9	10	11	12	13	14	15	16	17	18	19	20	21	22	23	24	25	26	27	28	29	30	31	32	33	34	35	36	37	38
Ground	H	A	A	H	A	H	A	H	A	H	A	H	A	H	A	H	H	A	A	H	A	H	H	A	H	A	A	H	A	A	H	H	A	H	H	A	H	A
Result	D	W	D	L	L	L	D	L	D	W	D	L	D	W	L	L	W	L	L	D	D	L	D	L	D	L	L	L	D	L	D	L	L	W	D	L	L	L
Position	9	6	6	9	13	16	16	17	17	15	15	15	15	13	16	17	14	15	16	16	16	16	15	15	16	17	18	19	19	19	19	19	19	19	19	19	19	19

Updated to match(es) played on 21 May 2017. Source: Statto
A = Away; H = Home; W = Win; D = Draw; L = Loss

==== Results summary ====
Overall								Home						Away					
Pld	W	D	L	GF	GA	GD	Pts	W	D	L	GF	GA	GD	W	D	L	GF	GA	GD
38	5	13	20	27	53	−26	28	4	6	9	17	22	−5	1	7	11	10	31	−21

Last updated: 21 May 2017.
Source: Premier League

==== League table ====
Pos	Team	Pld	W	D	L	GF	GA	GD	Pts	Qualification or relegation
16	Burnley	38	11	7	20	39	55	−16	40	
17	Watford	38	11	7	20	40	68	−28	40	
18	Hull City (R)	38	9	7	22	37	80	−43	34	Relegation to EFL Championship
19	Middlesbrough (R)	38	5	13	20	27	53	−26	28	Relegation to EFL Championship
20	Sunderland (R)	38	6	6	26	29	69	−40	24	Relegation to EFL Championship

Source: Premier League
Rules for classification: 1) Points; 2) Goal difference; 3) Goals scored; 4) Play-offs (only if needed to decide champion, teams for relegation or teams for UEFA competitions).
(R) Relegated

=== FA Cup ===
Win Draw Loss

8 January 2017 Third round	Middlesbrough	3–0	Sheffield Wednesday	Middlesbrough
15:00 GMT	Negredo (yellow card) 24', (goal) 67'; De Roon (yellow card) 48', (goal) 90+1'; Leadbitter 58', (yellow card) 60'; Ayala (red card) 59'	Report	Fletcher (yellow card) 27'; Bannan (yellow card) 56'	Stadium: Riverside Stadium; Attendance: 23,661; Referee: David Coote

28 January 2017 Fourth round	Middlesbrough	1–0	Accrington Stanley	Middlesbrough
15:00 GMT	Leadbitter (yellow card) 64'; Downing 69', (yellow card) 88'; Clayton (yellow card) 81'; Gibson (yellow card) 90+4'	Report	Conneely (yellow card) 14'; Clare (yellow card) 85'; Rodgers (yellow card) 90+5'	Stadium: Riverside Stadium; Attendance: 24,040; Referee: Anthony Taylor

18 February 2017 Fifth round	Middlesbrough	3–2	Oxford United	Middlesbrough
15:00 GMT	Leadbitter 26' (pen.); Gestede 34'; Ayala (yellow card) 62'; Chambers (yellow card) 71'; Stuani 86'; Negredo (yellow card) 90+2'	Report	Maguire 62'; Martínez 65'; Ledson (yellow card) 76'; Johnson (yellow card) 90+4'	Stadium: Riverside Stadium; Attendance: 28,198; Referee: Andre Marriner

11 March 2017 Quarter-final	Middlesbrough	0–2	Manchester City	Middlesbrough
12:15 GMT	Barragán (yellow card) 17'; Leadbitter (yellow card) 45'; Traoré (yellow card) 45+3'; De Roon (yellow card) 83'	Report	Silva 3'; Agüero 67'	Stadium: Riverside Stadium; Attendance: 32,228; Referee: Mike Dean

=== EFL Cup ===
Win Draw Loss

22 August 2016 Second round	Fulham	2–1 (a.e.t.)	Middlesbrough	Fulham, London
19:45 BST	Adeniran (yellow card) 15'; De Sart 54' (o.g.); Kavanagh (yellow card) 72'; Stearman (yellow card) 79'; Christensen 113'	Report	Nugent 8'; Ayala (yellow card) 32'	Stadium: Craven Cottage; Attendance: 8,522; Referee: David Coote

== Statistics ==
=== Appearances ===
No.	Pos.	Name	Premier League			FA Cup			EFL Cup			Total			Discipline	
No.	Pos.	Name	Apps	Goals	Assists	Apps	Goals	Assists	Apps	Goals	Assists	Apps	Goals	Assists	Yellow card	Red card
1	GK	(Greece) Dimitrios Konstantopoulos	0	0	0	1	0	0	0	0	0	1	0	0	0	0
2	DF	(Brazil) Fábio	21 (3)	0	0	3 (1)	0	0	1	0	1	25 (3)	0	1	8	0
3	DF	(England) George Friend	20 (4)	0	2	2	0	0	0 (1)	0	0	22 (5)	0	2	4	0
4	DF	(Spain) Daniel Ayala	11 (3)	1	0	2	0	0	1	0	0	14 (3)	1	0	5	1
5	DF	(Colombia) Bernardo Espinosa	10 (1)	0	0	4	0	0	0	0	0	14 (1)	0	0	2	0
6	DF	(England) Ben Gibson	38	1	1	2	0	0	1	0	0	41	1	1	5	0
7	MF	(England) Grant Leadbitter	7 (6)	1	0	4	2	1	0	0	0	11 (6)	3	1	4	0
8	MF	(England) Adam Clayton	32 (2)	0	2	4	0	0	1	0	0	36 (2)	0	2	11	0
10	FW	(Spain) Álvaro Negredo	33 (3)	9	4	1 (2)	1	1	0	0	0	34 (5)	10	5	5	0
11	FW	(Denmark) Viktor Fischer	6 (7)	0	3	2	0	0	1	0	0	9 (7)	0	3	0	0
12	GK	(United States) Brad Guzan	10	0	0	3	0	0	1	0	0	14	0	0	0	0
14	MF	(Netherlands) Marten de Roon	32 (1)	4	0	2	1	0	0	0	0	34 (1)	5	0	9	0
17	DF	(Spain) Antonio Barragán	26	0	0	1	0	0	0	0	0	27	0	0	5	0
18	MF	(Uruguay) Cristhian Stuani	16 (7)	4	0	2 (2)	1	0	0 (1)	0	0	18 (10)	5	0	4	0
19	MF	(England) Stewart Downing	24 (6)	1	3	2 (1)	1	0	1	0	0	27 (7)	2	3	2	0
20	FW	(England) Patrick Bamford	2 (6)	1	0	1	0	0	0	0	0	3 (6)	1	0	1	0
21	MF	(Uruguay) Gastón Ramírez	20 (4)	2	3	0 (2)	0	0	0	0	0	20 (6)	2	3	9	1
22	DF	(England) Dael Fry	0	0	0	0 (2)	0	0	0	0	0	0 (2)	0	0	0	0
25	DF	(England) Calum Chambers	24	1	1	2	0	0	0	0	0	26	1	1	5	0
26	GK	(Spain) Víctor Valdés	28	0	0	0	0	0	0	0	0	28	0	0	1	0
27	MF	(Algeria) Adlène Guedioura	0 (5)	0	0	0	0	0	0	0	0	0 (5)	0	0	0	0
29	FW	(Benin) Rudy Gestede	4 (12)	1	0	3	1	0	0	0	0	7 (12)	2	0	2	0
34	MF	(England) Adam Forshaw	30 (4)	0	1	0	0	0	0 (1)	0	0	30 (5)	0	1	4	0
37	FW	(Spain) Adama Traoré	16 (11)	0	1	3 (1)	0	0	0	0	0	19 (12)	0	1	2	0
40	DF	(England) James Husband	1	0	0	0	0	0	0	0	0	1	0	0	0	0
Players who left the club in August/January transfer window or on loan
9	FW	(Scotland) Jordan Rhodes	2 (4)	0	0	0	0	0	0	0	0	2 (4)	0	0	0	0
13	GK	(Spain) Tomás Mejías	0	0	0	0	0	0	0	0	0	0	0	0	0	0
15	DF	(England) Alex Baptiste	0	0	0	0	0	0	1	0	0	1	0	0	0	0
16	MF	(Uruguay) Carlos de Pena	0	0	0	0	0	0	0	0	0	0	0	0	0	0
20	MF	(England) Adam Reach	0	0	0	0	0	0	0	0	0	0	0	0	0	0
23	MF	(Belgium) Julien De Sart	0	0	0	0	0	0	1	0	0	1	0	0	0	0
24	DF	(Equatorial Guinea) Emilio Nsue	4	0	0	0	0	0	1	0	0	5	0	0	0	0
27	MF	(Ghana) Albert Adomah	1 (1)	0	0	0	0	0	0	0	0	1 (1)	0	0	0	0
35	FW	(England) David Nugent	0 (4)	0	0	0	0	0	1	1	0	1 (4)	1	0	0	0
-	MF	(England) Bryn Morris	0	0	0	0	0	0	0	0	0	0	0	0	0	0

=== Top scorers ===
The list is sorted by shirt number when total goals are equal.

Rnk	Pos	No.	Player	Premier League	FA Cup	League Cup	Total
1	FW	10	(Spain) Álvaro Negredo	9	1	0	10
2	RM	18	(Uruguay) Cristhian Stuani	4	1	0	5
2	CM	14	(Netherlands) Marten de Roon	4	1	0	5
4	CM	7	(England) Grant Leadbitter	1	2	0	3
5	AM	21	(Uruguay) Gastón Ramírez	2	0	0	2
5	LM	19	(England) Stewart Downing	1	1	0	2
5	FW	29	(Benin) Rudy Gestede	1	1	0	2
8	CB	4	(Spain) Daniel Ayala	1	0	0	1
8	CB	6	(England) Ben Gibson	1	0	0	1
8	FW	20	(England) Patrick Bamford	1	0	0	1
8	CB	25	(England) Calum Chambers	1	0	0	1
8	FW	35	(England) David Nugent	0	0	1	1
Own goals				1	0	0	1
Total				27	7	1	35

=== Clean sheets ===
The list is sorted by shirt number when total appearances are equal.

Rnk	No.	Player	Premier League	FA Cup	League Cup	Total
1	26	(Spain) Víctor Valdés	8	0	0	8
2	12	(United States) Brad Guzan	3	1	0	4
3	1	(Greece) Dimitrios Konstantopoulos	0	1	0	1
4	13	(Spain) Tomás Mejías	0	0	0	0
Total			11	2	0	13
