= 2025–26 Middlesbrough F.C. season =

English football club season

Middlesbrough
2025–26 season
- Owner: Steve Gibson
- Chairman: Steve Gibson
- Head coach: Rob Edwards (until 12 November); Kim Hellberg (from 26 November)
- Stadium: Riverside Stadium
- Championship: 5th
- Play-offs: Runners-up
- FA Cup: Third round
- EFL Cup: First round
- Top goalscorer: League: Morgan Whittaker (14); All: Morgan Whittaker (14)
- Average home league attendance: 27,230
Home colours	Away colours

The 2025–26 season was the 150th season in the history of Middlesbrough Football Club, and the club's consecutive season in the Championship. In addition to the domestic league, the club also participated in the FA Cup and the EFL Cup.

== Managerial changes ==
Prior to the season starting, Rob Edwards was appointed as the new head coach on a three-year contract. On 12 November, after 15 games in charge and a win ratio of 46.67%, he resigned as head coach to join Wolverhampton Wanderers. Twelve days later, Kim Hellberg was appointed head coach from Swedish side Hammarby.

== Transfers and contracts ==
=== In ===
Date	Pos.	Player	From	Fee	Ref.
1 July 2025	GK	(England) Owen Foster	(England) Hull City	Free	
4 July 2025	CB	(England) Archie Baptiste	(England) Tottenham Hotspur	Free	
25 July 2025	CF	(England) Jayden Carbon	(England) Oxford City	Undisclosed	
25 July 2025	CB	(England) Jack Daley	(England) Newcastle Blue Star	Free transfer	
25 July 2025	CB	(Canada) Alfie Jones	(England) Hull City	£3,000,000	
29 July 2025	DM	(Ivory Coast) Abdoulaye Kanté	(France) Troyes	£2,610,000	
4 August 2025	RB	(England) Callum Brittain	(England) Blackburn Rovers	£3,500,000	
13 August 2025	RW	(Curaçao) Sontje Hansen	(Netherlands) NEC Nijmegen	£3,000,000	
20 August 2025	CB	(France) Adilson Malanda	(United States) Charlotte	£7,364,000	
29 August 2025	CF	(Senegal) Kaly Sène	(Switzerland) Lausanne-Sport	£1,500,000	
1 September 2025	GK	(Scotland) Jon McLaughlin	(Wales) Swansea City	Free	
1 September 2025	CF	(Slovakia) David Strelec	(Slovakia) Slovan Bratislava	£8,000,000	
9 January 2026	DM	(England) Leo Castledine	(England) Chelsea	£1,000,000	
15 January 2026	LB	(England) Finley Munroe	(England) Aston Villa	£300,000 (Note: Aston Villa have a 30% sell-on clause)	
3 February 2026	CF	(Ghana) Hinneh Lord Listowell	(Ghana) Asante Kotoko	Undisclosed	

Expenditure: ▼ ≈ £30,274,000 (all fees converted into GBP)

=== Out ===
Date	Pos.	Player	To	Fee	Ref.
20 June 2025	GK	(England) Zach Hemming	(England) Chesterfield	£150,000	
26 June 2025	CF	(England) Josh Coburn	(England) Millwall	£5,000,000	
13 August 2025	CB	(Netherlands) Rav van den Berg	(Germany) Köln	£11,200,000	
29 August 2025	CAM	(Republic of Ireland) Finn Azaz	(England) Southampton	£12,000,000	
17 January 2026	LB	(Denmark) Lukas Engel	(United States) Real Salt Lake	£740,000	
17 January 2026	LW	(England) Charlie Lennon	(England) Barnsley	Undisclosed	
27 March 2026	CF	(England) Sonny Finch	(England) South Shields	Free Transfer	

Income: ▲£29,090,000

=== Loans in ===
Date	Pos.	Player	From	Date until	Ref.
19 August 2025	CM	(Norway) Sverre Nypan	(England) Manchester City	2 February 2026 (Note: On 2 February, Nypan's initial season-long loan from Manchester City was terminated)	
27 August 2025	LB	(England) Matt Targett	(England) Newcastle United	31 May 2026	
1 September 2025	CM	(Republic of Ireland) Alan Browne	(England) Sunderland	31 May 2026	
27 January 2026	LW	(Ecuador) Jeremy Sarmiento	(England) Brighton & Hove Albion	31 May 2026	
2 February 2026	GK	(England) Joe Wildsmith	(England) West Bromwich Albion	31 May 2026	

=== Loans out ===
Date	Pos.	Player	To	Date until	Ref.
20 August 2025	CB	(France) Adilson Malanda	(United States) Charlotte	31 December 2025	
29 August 2025	LW	(England) Charlie Lennon	(England) Darlington	17 January 2026 (Note: On 6 January, Lennon's loan at Darlington was extended by another month. But on 17 January he was recalled back to join Barnsley)	
31 August 2025	LB	(Brazil) Neto Borges	(England) Bristol City	31 May 2026	
1 September 2025	CF	(Finland) Marcus Forss	(England) Bolton Wanderers	31 May 2026	
1 September 2025	CM	(England) Law McCabe	(England) Plymouth Argyle	5 January 2026 (Note: On 5 January, McCabe returned from his loan at Plymouth early)	
2 September 2025	CDM	(England) Daniel Barlaser	(Scotland) Hibernian	31 May 2026	
26 September 2025	CDM	(England) Luke Woolston	(England) South Shields	2 January 2026	
25 October 2025	RW	(England) Max Howells	(England) Darlington	31 May 2026 (Note: On 1 December, Howells' loan at Darlington was extended by a further month, Then on 6 January it was extended further until the end of the season)	
11 November 2025	RW	(England) Frankie Coulson	(England) Morpeth Town	9 December 2025	
13 January 2026	CF	(England) Sonny Finch	(England) South Shields	27 March 2026 (Note: On 27 March, Finch joined South Shields on a permanent basis)	
29 January 2026	LW	(Suriname) Delano Burgzorg	(England) Bristol City	31 May 2026	
30 January 2026	CDM	(Ivory Coast) Abdoulaye Kanté	(France) Saint-Étienne	31 May 2026	
2 February 2026	CF	(England) Jayden Carbon	(Scotland) Ross County	31 May 2026	
19 February 2026	GK	(Senegal) Seny Dieng	(England) Sheffield Wednesday	26 February 2026	
19 March 2026	CM	(England) Brayden Johnson	(England) Kidderminster Harriers	31 May 2026	
27 March 2026	CB	(England) Archie Baptiste	(England) Rochdale	31 May 2026	
27 March 2026	GK	(England) Shea Connor	(England) Gateshead	31 May 2026	
27 March 2026	RWB	(England) Rio Patterson-Powell	(England) Gateshead	31 May 2026	

=== Released / out of contract ===
Date	Pos.	Player	Subsequent club	Join date	Ref.
30 June 2025	CB	(England) Jack Hannah	(Scotland) Queen of the South	1 July 2025	
30 June 2025	CM	(England) Jack Stott	(Scotland) Queen of the South	1 July 2025	
30 June 2025	CB	(England) Cain Sykes	(England) South Shields	1 July 2025	
30 June 2025	CB	(England) Afonso Lindo	(Georgia (country)) Iberia 1999	15 July 2025	
30 June 2025	RB	(England) Nathan Simpson	(England) Chester-le-Street Town	22 July 2025	
30 June 2025	RB	(Suriname) Anfernee Dijksteel	(Turkey) Kocaelispor	28 July 2025	
30 June 2025	CB	(England) Alfie Myers-Smith	(England) Darlington	1 August 2025	
30 June 2025	CF	(England) Daniel Nkrumah	(England) Wealdstone	8 August 2025	
30 June 2025	CM	(England) Jonny Howson	(England) Leeds United	11 August 2025	
30 June 2025	LW	(England) Pharrell Willis	(United States) Columbus Crew	21 August 2025	
30 June 2025	RB	(England) Terrell Agyemang	(England) Morecambe	27 August 2025	
30 June 2025	LB	(England) George Gitau	(England) Dagenham & Redbridge	1 November 2025	
1 September 2025	GK	(Australia) Tom Glover	(Japan) RB Omiya Ardija	24 December 2025	

=== New contracts ===
Date	Pos.	Player	Contracted until	Ref.
2 October 2025	CM	(England) Isaac Greenup	Undisclosed (Note: First professional contract)	
9 October 2025	RWB	(England) Rio Patterson-Powell	Undisclosed	
17 November 2025	CF	(England) Cruz Ibeh	Undisclosed	
4 December 2025	CF	(England) Layton Campbell	Undisclosed	
22 December 2025	GK	(England) Sol Brynn	30 June 2030	
6 January 2026	CB	(England) Oliver Martin	Undisclosed	
30 March 2026	RB	(England) Luke Ayling	30 June 2027	

== Pre-season and friendlies ==
On 27 May, Middlesbrough announced their first pre-season friendly, against Rangers. A week later, a second fixture was confirmed, against Hartlepool United. A third trip was later added against Bradford City. A home friendly was later announced, against Deportivo La Coruña. On 4 July, a trip to Mansfield Town was added.

Win Draw Loss Fixtures

12 July 2025 Friendly	Santa Clara	1–0	Middlesbrough	TBC, Portugal
14:00 WEST		Report		Stadium: TBC; Attendance: 0 (behind-closed-doors)

19 July 2025 Friendly	Mansfield Town	3–3	Middlesbrough	Mansfield
15:00 BST	Moriah-Welsh 61'; McLaughlin 83'; Bowery 87' (pen.)	Report	Fry 22'; Conway 34'; Whittaker 37'	Stadium: Field Mill

23 July 2025 Friendly	Bradford City	2–0	Middlesbrough	Bradford
19:00 BST	Sarcevic 44' (pen.); Swan 90+5'	Report		Stadium: Valley Parade

26 July 2025 Friendly	Rangers	2–2	Middlesbrough	Ibrox, Scotland
14:00 BST	Danilo 63'; Curtis 78'	Report	Borges 9'; Fry 57'	Stadium: Ibrox Stadium

30 July 2025 Friendly	Hartlepool United	1–1	Middlesbrough	Hartlepool
19:00 BST	Johnson 59'	Report	Finch 73'	Stadium: Victoria Park

2 August 2025 Friendly	Middlesbrough	2–2	Deportivo La Coruña	Middlesbrough
15:00 BST	Conway 4', 67'	Report	Hernández 10'; Noubi 49'	Stadium: Riverside Stadium

== Competitions ==
=== Overall record ===
Competition	First match	Last match	Starting round	Final position	Record							
Competition	First match	Last match	Starting round	Final position	Pld	W	D	L	GF	GA	GD	Win %
Championship	9 August 2025	2 May 2026	Matchday 1	5th	46	22	14	10	72	47	+25	47.83
Championship play-offs	9 May 2026	23 May 2026	Semi-finals	Runners-up	3	0	1	2	1	3	−2	0.00
FA Cup	10 January 2026		Third round	Third round	1	0	0	1	1	3	−2	0.00
EFL Cup	12 August 2025		First round	First round	1	0	0	1	0	4	−4	0.00
Total					51	22	15	14	74	57	+17	43.14

Source: Soccerway

=== Championship ===
==== League table ====
Pos	Team	Pld	W	D	L	GF	GA	GD	Pts	Promotion, qualification or relegation
3	Millwall	46	24	11	11	64	49	+15	83	Qualification for the Championship play-offs
4	Southampton (Note: Southampton qualified for the play-offs and defeated Middlesbrough to qualify for the final, but were subsequently disqualified for multiple breaches of EFL regulations related to the unauthorised filming of other clubs' training, with Middlesbrough taking their place in the play-off final.) (D)	46	22	14	10	82	56	+26	80	Qualification for the Championship play-offs
5	Middlesbrough	46	22	14	10	72	47	+25	80	Qualification for the Championship play-offs
6	Hull City (O, P)	46	21	10	15	70	66	+4	73	Qualification for the Championship play-offs
7	Wrexham	46	19	14	13	69	65	+4	71	

Source: EFL Official Website
Rules for classification: 1) Points; 2) Goal difference; 3) Number of goals scored; 4) Head-to-head results; 5) Wins; 6) Away goals; 7) Penalty points (sec 9.5); 8) Number of 12-point sending off offences; 9) Play-off (only if needed to determine promotion/relegation)
(D) Disqualified; (O) Play-off winners; (P) Promoted

==== Results summary ====
Overall								Home						Away					
Pld	W	D	L	GF	GA	GD	Pts	W	D	L	GF	GA	GD	W	D	L	GF	GA	GD
46	22	14	10	72	47	+25	80	12	6	5	34	18	+16	10	8	5	38	29	+9

Source: Soccerway

==== Results by round ====
Round	1	2	3	4	5	6	7	8	9	10	11	12	13	14	15	16	17	18	19	20	21	22	23	24	25	26	27	28	29	30	31	32	33	34	35	36	37	38	39	40	41	42	43	44	45	46
Ground	H	A	A	H	A	H	A	H	A	H	A	H	A	A	H	A	H	H	A	A	H	A	H	H	A	H	A	A	H	H	A	A	H	H	A	A	H	H	A	H	A	H	A	H	H	A
Result	W	W	W	W	D	W	D	D	L	W	W	D	L	D	W	D	L	W	W	W	W	L	D	L	L	W	W	W	W	W	W	L	D	D	W	W	L	D	D	L	D	L	D	W	W	D
Position	8	2	2	1	1	1	1	1	2	2	2	2	2	3	2	2	3	2	2	2	2	2	2	2	3	2	2	2	2	2	1	2	2	2	2	2	2	2	2	3	3	5	5	5	5	5
Points	3	6	9	12	13	16	17	18	18	21	24	25	25	26	29	30	30	33	36	39	42	42	43	43	43	46	49	52	55	58	61	61	62	63	66	69	69	70	71	71	72	72	73	76	79	80

Source: EFL
A = Away; H = Home; W = Win; D = Draw; L = Loss; P = Postponed

==== Matches ====
On 26 June the Championship fixtures were announced, with Middlesbrough hosting Swansea City on the opening weekend.

Win Draw Loss Fixtures

9 August 2025 1	Middlesbrough	1–0	Swansea City	Middlesbrough
15:00 BST	Silvera (yellow card) 10'; Fry 51'; Ayling (yellow card) 90+7'	Report	Fulton (yellow card) 29'; Franco (yellow card) 41'; Galbraith (yellow card) 60'; Burgess (yellow card) 90+6'; Cullen (yellow card) 90+7'	Stadium: Riverside Stadium; Attendance: 26,035; Referee: Farai Hallam

16 August 2025 2	Millwall	0–3	Middlesbrough	Bermondsey
15:00 BST	Crama (yellow card) 27'; Coburn (yellow card) 32'; Mitchell (yellow card) 38'; Sturge (yellow card) 70'	Report	Conway (yellow card) 42'; Hackney 49'; Whittaker (yellow card) 59'; Silvera (yellow card) 68'; Jones 87'; Edmundson (yellow card) 89'; Burgzorg (yellow card) 90+5', (goal) 90+7'	Stadium: The Den; Attendance: 18,021; Referee: Tom Nield

23 August 2025 3	Norwich City	1–2	Middlesbrough	Norwich
15:00 BST	Wright (red card) 58'; Sargent 85'	Report	Azaz 43'; Conway 45'; Hackney (yellow card) 48'; Brittain (yellow card) 61'; Nypan (yellow card) 90+7'	Stadium: Carrow Road; Attendance: 26,381; Referee: Leigh Doughty

30 August 2025 4	Middlesbrough	1–0	Sheffield United	Middlesbrough
12:30 BST	Conway 64'	Report	Peck (yellow card) 18'; Brooks (yellow card) 25'; Hamer (yellow card) 62'	Stadium: Riverside Stadium; Attendance: 26,610; Referee: Lewis Smith
Note: Fixture was originally scheduled for a 15:00 kick-off, but was moved live Sky Sports broadcasting.

13 September 2025 5	Preston North End	2–2	Middlesbrough	Preston
12:30 BST	Dobbin 22'; Hughes (yellow card) 58'; Storey 88'	Report	Whittaker (yellow card) 8'; Jones (yellow card) 11'; Targett 72'; Hansen 90+2'; Lenihan (yellow card) 90+7'	Stadium: Deepdale; Attendance: 19,391; Referee: Thomas Kirk
Note: Fixture was originally scheduled for a 15:00 kick-off, but was moved live Sky Sports broadcasting.

19 September 2025 6	Middlesbrough	2–1	West Bromwich Albion	Middlesbrough
20:00 BST	Strelec 26'; Sène 61'		Heggebo 90'	Stadium: Riverside Stadium; Attendance: 27,803; Referee: Andrew Kitchen
Note: Fixture was originally scheduled for 20 September, but was moved live Sky Sports broadcasting.

27 September 2025 7	Southampton	1–1	Middlesbrough	Southampton
15:00 BST	Armstrong (yellow card) 54', (goal) 61'	Report	Jones (yellow card) 24'; Conway (yellow card) 50'; Strelec (yellow card) 51'; Sène 77'; Hackney (yellow card) 87'; Targett (yellow card) 90'; Nypan (yellow card) 90+3'	Stadium: St Mary's Stadium; Attendance: 28,605; Referee: Farai Hallam

30 September 2025 8	Middlesbrough	0–0	Stoke City	Middlesbrough
19:45 BST	Silvera (yellow card) 13'; Conway (yellow card) 32'	Report		Stadium: Riverside Stadium; Attendance: 24,707; Referee: David Webb

4 October 2025 9	Portsmouth	1–0	Middlesbrough	Milton
15:00 BST	Yang Min-hyeok 23'; Pack (yellow card) 74'; Bursik (yellow card) 83'	Report	Brittain (yellow card) 68'	Stadium: Fratton Park; Attendance: 20,397; Referee: Anthony Backhouse

17 October 2025 10	Middlesbrough	2–1	Ipswich Town	Middlesbrough
20:00 BST	Jones (yellow card) 20'; Brittain (yellow card) 42'; Kipré 45+2' (o.g.); Whittaker 55'; Sène (yellow card) 83'		O'Shea 76'; Matusiwa (yellow card) 78'	Stadium: Riverside Stadium; Attendance: 27,805; Referee: Matt Donohue
Note: Fixture was originally scheduled for 18 October, but was rescheduled for live Sky Sports broadcasting.

22 October 2025 11	Sheffield Wednesday	0–1	Middlesbrough	Owlerton
20:00 BST	Fusire (yellow card) 72'; Lumley (yellow card) 83'; Valery (yellow card) 89'	Report	Whittaker 6'; Hackney (yellow card) 74'	Stadium: Hillsborough Stadium; Attendance: 7,081; Referee: Thomas Kirk
Note: Fixture was originally scheduled for a 19:45 kick-off, but was rescheduled for live Sky Sports broadcasting.

25 October 2025 12	Middlesbrough	1–1	Wrexham	Middlesbrough
15:00 BST	Hackney 80'	Report	Windass 7', (yellow card) 32'; Dobson (yellow card) 45+4'; O'Brien (yellow card) 65'; James (yellow card) 71'; Scarr (yellow card) 90+1'	Stadium: Riverside Stadium; Attendance: 30,046; Referee: Stephen Martin

1 November 2025 13	Watford	3–0	Middlesbrough	Watford
15:00 GMT	Louza 15'; Kjerrumgaard 32'; Baah (yellow card) 34'; Doumbia 49'; Keben (yellow card) 45'	Report	Ayling (yellow card) 57'	Stadium: Vicarage Road; Attendance: 19,278; Referee: John Busby

4 November 2025 14	Leicester City	1–1	Middlesbrough	Leicester
19:45 GMT	Fatawu (yellow card) 23'; Ayew 45+5' (pen.), (yellow card) 59'; James (yellow card) 49'; Skipp (yellow card) 67'; Thomas (yellow card) 69'; Daka (yellow card) 90+3'	Report	Jones (red card) 90'; Ayling 90+6'	Stadium: King Power Stadium; Attendance: 28,389; Referee: Adam Herczeg

8 November 2025 15	Middlesbrough	2–1	Birmingham City	Middlesbrough
15:00 GMT	Fry 17'; Ayling (yellow card) 30'; Hackney 45+5'	Report	Gray 29'; Beadle (yellow card) 90+3'	Stadium: Riverside Stadium; Attendance: 26,378; Referee: Sam Allison

22 November 2025 16	Oxford United	1–1	Middlesbrough	Littlemore
15:00 GMT	L. Harris (yellow card) 15', (goal) 28'; De Keersmaecker (yellow card) 40'; M. Harris (yellow card) 83'	Report	Browne (yellow card) 34'; Whittaker 54'; Sène (yellow card) 87'	Stadium: Kassam Stadium; Attendance: 11,138; Referee: Ben Toner

25 November 2025 17	Middlesbrough	2–4	Coventry City	Middlesbrough
19:45 GMT	Whittaker 32'; Thomas 49' (o.g.)	Report	Simms 10', 86'; Kitching 14', 85'	Stadium: Riverside Stadium; Attendance: 26,726; Referee: Matt Donohue

29 November 2025 18	Middlesbrough	2–1	Derby County	Middlesbrough
15:00 GMT	Targett 75'; Whittaker 84'	Report	Agyemang 2'; Clark (yellow card) 22'; Elder (yellow card) 67'	Stadium: Riverside Stadium; Attendance: 25,402; Referee: James Linington

5 December 2025 19	Hull City	1–4	Middlesbrough	Kingston upon Hull
20:00 GMT	Slater (yellow card) 58'; Gelhardt 62' (pen.)	Report	Strelec 9'; Gilbert 32'; Whittaker 35'; McGree 44'	Stadium: MKM Stadium; Attendance: 21,105; Referee: Dean Whitestone
Note: Fixture was originally scheduled for 6 December, but was rescheduled for live Sky Sports broadcasting.

9 December 2025 20	Charlton Athletic	1–2	Middlesbrough	Charlton
19:45 GMT	Knibbs (yellow card) 31'; Bree (yellow card) 38'; Docherty (yellow card) 75'; Edmundson 81' (o.g.); Ramsay (yellow card) 82'	Report	McGree 33'; Whittaker 45+3'; Gilbert (yellow card) 69'	Stadium: The Valley; Attendance: 17,258; Referee: Oliver Langford

13 December 2025 21	Middlesbrough	3–1	Queens Park Rangers	Middlesbrough
15:00 GMT	Strelec 30'; McGree (yellow card) 32'; Whittaker 36'; Conway 50' (pen.)	Report	Madsen 70' (pen.)	Stadium: Riverside Stadium; Attendance: 24,055; Referee: David Webb

20 December 2025 22	Bristol City	2–0	Middlesbrough	Bristol
15:00 GMT	Riis Jakobsen 17'; Armstrong (yellow card) 36'; Atkinson 62'; Pring (yellow card) 87'	Report	Whittaker (yellow card) 25'; Targett (yellow card) 33'; Ayling (yellow card) 87'	Stadium: Ashton Gate; Attendance: 24,259; Referee: Anthony Backhouse
Note: Fixture was originally scheduled for 31 January, but was rescheduled for live Sky Sports broadcasting.

26 December 2025 23	Middlesbrough	0–0	Blackburn Rovers	Middlesbrough
15:00 GMT	Gilbert (yellow card) 31'; Hackney (yellow card) 80'		Morishita (yellow card) 32'; Baradji (yellow card) 57'	Stadium: Riverside Stadium; Attendance: 31,475; Referee: James Bell

29 December 2025 24	Middlesbrough	0–1	Hull City	Middlesbrough
19:45 GMT	Ayling (yellow card) 76'; Hansen (yellow card) 78'	Report	Gyabi 12'; McCarthy (yellow card) 15'; Akintola (yellow card) 30'; Egan (yellow card) 58'; Joseph (yellow card) 64'	Stadium: Riverside Stadium; Attendance: 31,421; Referee: Leigh Doughty

1 January 2026 25	Derby County	1–0	Middlesbrough	Derby
15:00 GMT	Elder (yellow card) 59'; Clark 70'; Salvesen (yellow card) 73'		Gilbert (yellow card) 84'; Targett (yellow card) 90+4'	Stadium: Pride Park Stadium; Attendance: 30,266; Referee: Andrew Kitchen

4 January 2026 26	Middlesbrough	4–0	Southampton	Middlesbrough
15:00 GMT	Whittaker 54', 66'; Silvera 61'; Browne 76'	Report	Manning (yellow card) 64'; Harwood-Bellis (yellow card) 68'; Bragg (yellow card) 68'; Quarshie (yellow card) 81'	Stadium: Riverside Stadium; Attendance: 26,077; Referee: Oliver Langford

16 January 2026 27	West Bromwich Albion	2–3	Middlesbrough	West Bromwich
20:00 GMT	Mepham (yellow card) 69'; Price 75'; Wallace 80'; Styles (yellow card) 88'	Report	Taylor 42' (o.g.); Silvera 58'; Burgzorg 90'	Stadium: The Hawthorns; Referee: Josh Smith
Note: Fixture was initially scheduled for 17 January, but was rescheduled for live Sky Sports broadcasting.

21 January 2026 28	Stoke City	1–2	Middlesbrough	Stoke-on-Trent
20:00 GMT	Rigo 15'	Report	Browne 48'; Conway 59'	Stadium: bet365 Stadium; Attendance: 20,992
Note: Fixture was initially scheduled for a 19:45 kick-off, but was rescheduled for live Sky Sports broadcasting.

24 January 2026 29	Middlesbrough	4–0	Preston North End	Middlesbrough
12:30 GMT	Browne 9', Conway 28', 54', Whittaker 42'	Report	Storey (red card) 50'	Stadium: Riverside Stadium
Note: Fixture was initially scheduled for a 15:00 kick-off, but was rescheduled for live Sky Sports broadcasting.

31 January 2026 30	Middlesbrough	1–0	Norwich City	Middlesbrough
15:00 GMT	Hackney 17'; Strelec (yellow card) 72'; Morris (yellow card) 80'	Report	Kovačević (yellow card) 56'; Ben Slimane (yellow card) 80'	Stadium: Riverside Stadium; Attendance: 28,616; Referee: Ben Toner

9 February 2026 31	Sheffield United	1–2	Middlesbrough	Sheffield
20:00 GMT	Brooks (yellow card) 65'; Bamford 73'; Phillips (yellow card) 76'; Rothwell (red card) 80'; Hamer (yellow card) 90+3'	Report	Conway 19'; McGree 45'; Brittain (yellow card) 69'; Gilbert (yellow card) 77'	Stadium: Bramall Lane; Attendance: 27,764; Referee: Gavin Ward
Note: Fixture was initially scheduled for 7 February, but was rescheduled for live Sky Sports broadcasting.

16 February 2026 32	Coventry City	3–1	Middlesbrough	Coventry
20:00 GMT	Wright 21', 55', 71' (pen.); Onyeka (yellow card) 27'; Sakamoto (yellow card) 49'; Grimes (yellow card) 72'	Report	Morris (yellow card) 22'; McGree 67'; Ayling (yellow card) 70'	Stadium: Coventry Building Society Arena; Attendance: 30,908; Referee: Thomas Bramall
Note: Fixture was initially scheduled for 14 February, but was rescheduled for live Sky Sports broadcasting.

21 February 2026 33	Middlesbrough	0–0	Oxford United	Middlesbrough
15:00 GMT	Morris (yellow card) 39'; Targett (yellow card) 75'; Gilbert (yellow card) 86'	Report	Brannagan (yellow card) 62'	Stadium: Riverside Stadium; Attendance: 28,918; Referee: Oliver Langford

24 February 2026 34	Middlesbrough	1–1	Leicester City	Middlesbrough
19:45 GMT	Ayling (yellow card) 43'; McGree 45+2'	Report	Okoli 18'; Mukasa (yellow card) 53'	Stadium: Riverside Stadium; Attendance: 26,019; Referee: Andrew Kitchen

2 March 2026 35	Birmingham City	1–3	Middlesbrough	Bordesley
20:00 GMT	Ducksch 48'; Iwata (yellow card) 58'; Laird (yellow card) 90+1'	Report	Targett 13', 26'; Strelec 60'; Conway (yellow card) 66'; Brynn (yellow card) 85'; Malanda (yellow card) 90'; Brittain (yellow card) 90+4'	Stadium: St Andrew's; Attendance: 26,918; Referee: Thomas Kirk
Note: Fixture was initially scheduled for 28 February, but was rescheduled for live Sky Sports broadcasting.

8 March 2026 36	Queens Park Rangers	0–4	Middlesbrough	Shepherd's Bush
16:30 GMT		Report	Strelec 20'; Browne 68'; Hackney 72'; Conway 88' (pen.)	Stadium: Loftus Road; Attendance: 15,940; Referee: Josh Smith
Note: Fixture was initially scheduled for 7 March, but was moved for live Sky Sports broadcasting.

11 March 2026 37	Middlesbrough	0–1	Charlton Athletic	Middlesbrough
19:45 GMT		Report	Chambers (yellow card) 39'; Gillesphey (yellow card) 45'; Coady 59'	Stadium: Riverside Stadium; Attendance: 24,668; Referee: Adam Herczeg

14 March 2026 38	Middlesbrough	1–1	Bristol City	Middlesbrough
12:30 GMT	Castledine 65'; Conway (yellow card) 88'	Report	Eile (yellow card) 35'; Pring (yellow card) 43'; Twine (yellow card) 53'; Morsy (yellow card) 53'; Armstrong (yellow card) 58'; Randell 90+6'	Stadium: Riverside Stadium; Attendance: 34,988; Referee: Stephen Martin
Note: Fixture was initially scheduled for a 15:00 kick-off, but was brought forward for Sky Sports broadcasting.

21 March 2026 39	Blackburn Rovers	0–0	Middlesbrough	Blackburn
12:30 GMT		Report	Ayling (yellow card) 24'; Malanda (yellow card) 89'	Stadium: Ewood Park; Attendance: 18,959; Referee: Oliver Langford
Note: Fixture was initially scheduled for a 15:00 kick-off, but was brought forward for Sky Sports broadcasting.

3 April 2026 40	Middlesbrough	1–2	Millwall	Middlesbrough
12:30 BST	McGree (yellow card) 13'; Fry 26'	Report	Cooper (yellow card) 13'; Coburn 58', 86'	Stadium: Riverside Stadium; Attendance: 32,100; Referee: Anthony Backhouse
Note: Fixture was initially scheduled for a 15:00 kick-off, but was brought forward for Sky Sports broadcasting.

6 April 2026 41	Swansea City	2–2	Middlesbrough	Landore
17:30 BST	Vipotnik 20' (pen.), 45+4' (pen.); Franco (yellow card) 51'; Eom (yellow card) 65'; Yalcouyé (yellow card) 90+5'	Report	Bangura 12'; McGree (yellow card) 45+5'; Browne (yellow card) 62'; Conway 75' (pen.), (yellow card) 90'	Stadium: Swansea.com Stadium; Attendance: 18,168; Referee: Matt Donohue
Note: Fixture was initially scheduled for a 15:00 kick-off, but was pushed back for Sky Sports broadcasting.

11 April 2026 42	Middlesbrough	0–1	Portsmouth	Middlesbrough
15:00 BST	Fry (yellow card) 90+3'	Report	Williams (yellow card) 26'; Anderson (yellow card) 72'; Bishop (yellow card) 89'; Chaplin 90+7'	Stadium: Riverside Stadium; Attendance: 27,017; Referee: Thomas Kirk

19 April 2026 43	Ipswich Town	2–2	Middlesbrough	Ipswich
12:00 BST	McAteer 30'; J. Clarke 87' (pen.); Neil (yellow card) 90+1'; Furlong (yellow card) 90+3'	Report	Strelec 25'; Targett (yellow card) 52'; Conway 64'; Malanda (yellow card) 86'; Brittain (yellow card) 90+4'; Sarmiento (yellow card) 90+8'	Stadium: Portman Road; Attendance: 29,684; Referee: Jarred Gillett
Note: Fixture was initially scheduled for 18 April, but was pushed back a day for Sky Sports broadcasting.

22 April 2026 44	Middlesbrough	1–0	Sheffield Wednesday	Middlesbrough
19:45 BST	Whittaker 11', (yellow card) 30'; Malanda (yellow card) 52'	Report	Thornton (yellow card) 51'; Lowe (yellow card) 70'	Stadium: Riverside Stadium; Attendance: 25,245; Referee: David Webb
Note: Fixture was initially scheduled for 21 April, but was pushed back a day due to the Ipswich home game being moved to the preceding Sunday.

25 April 2026 45	Middlesbrough	5–1	Watford	Middlesbrough
12:30 BST	Whittaker 6', 58'; Strelec 45+1'; Conway 75', 90+2'	Report	Abankwah 48', (yellow card) 74'; Louza (yellow card) 85'	Stadium: Riverside Stadium; Attendance: 27,482; Referee: Adam Herczeg
Note: Fixture was initially scheduled for a 15:00 kick-off, but was brought forward for live Sky Sports broadcasting.

2 May 2026 46	Wrexham	2–2	Middlesbrough	Wrexham
12:30 BST				Stadium: STōK Cae Ras

==== Play-offs ====
Middlesbrough finished 5th in the regular season and were drawn against Southampton. Prior to the first leg, while training at Rockliffe, a member of staff believed they spotted a member of staff for Southampton spying in violation of Rule 127 of the EFL rules (No viewing of training within 72 hours of kickoff), dubbed by the media as Spygate 2.0. The following day, Southampton were charged by the EFL and were expelled from the playoffs and given a 4 point deduction for the next season on 29 May, pending appeal with Middlesbrough currently reinstated to the final to play Hull.

9 May 2026 Semi final - Leg 1	Middlesbrough	0–0	Southampton	Middlesbrough
12:30 BST		Report	Larin (yellow card) 55'; Downes (yellow card) 59'	Stadium: Riverside Stadium; Attendance: 32,045; Referee: Farai Hallam
Note: Live on Sky Sports.

12 May 2026 Semi final - Leg 2	Southampton	2–1 (a.e.t.) (2–1 agg.)	Middlesbrough	Southampton
20:00 BST	Stewart 45+1'; Charles 116'	Report	McGree 5'	Stadium: St Mary's Stadium; Attendance: 30,277; Referee: Andrew Madley
Note: Live on Sky Sports.

23 May 2026 Final	Hull City	1–0	Middlesbrough	Wembley
15:30 BST	McBurnie 90+5'	Report		Stadium: Wembley Stadium; Attendance: 84,506

=== FA Cup ===
Middlesbrough were drawn away to Fulham in the third round.

Win Draw Loss Fixtures

10 January 2026 Third round	Fulham	3–1	Middlesbrough	Fulham
15:00 GMT	Wilson 60'; Cuenca (yellow card) 72'; Smith Rowe 77'; Kevin 90+3'	Report	Gilbert (yellow card) 26'; Hackney 30'; Burgzorg (yellow card) 66'	Stadium: Craven Cottage; Attendance: 20,675; Referee: Lewis Smith

=== EFL Cup ===
Middlesbrough were drawn at home to Doncaster Rovers in the first round.

Win Draw Loss Fixtures

12 August 2025 First round	Middlesbrough	0–4	Doncaster Rovers	Middlesbrough
19:30 BST	Kanté (yellow card) 27'	Report	Close 11', (yellow card) 83'; Ajayi 23'; McGrath (yellow card) 47'; Grehan (yellow card) 60'; Gotts 84'; Nixon 90+6'	Stadium: Riverside Stadium; Attendance: 11,979; Referee: Matt Corlett

== Statistics ==
=== Appearances and goals ===
As of match played 25 April 2026

Players with no appearances are not included on the list; italics indicate loaned in player

No.	Pos	Nat	Player	Total		Championship		FA Cup		EFL Cup	
No.	Pos	Nat	Player	Apps	Goals	Apps	Goals	Apps	Goals	Apps	Goals
2	DF	(England) ENG	Callum Brittain	41	0	40+0	0	0+0	0	1+0	0
3	DF	(England) ENG	Matt Targett	42	4	38+3	4	1+0	0	0+0	0
5	DF	(Canada) CAN	Alfie Jones	23	1	22+0	1	0+0	0	1+0	0
6	DF	(England) ENG	Dael Fry	30	3	19+9	3	0+1	0	0+1	0
7	MF	(England) ENG	Hayden Hackney	40	6	38+0	5	1+0	1	0+1	0
8	MF	(Australia) AUS	Riley McGree	24	5	18+6	5	0+0	0	0+0	0
9	FW	(Scotland) SCO	Tommy Conway	47	13	42+3	13	1+0	0	1+0	0
11	FW	(England) ENG	Morgan Whittaker	41	14	34+5	14	1+0	0	1+0	0
12	DF	(England) ENG	Luke Ayling	44	1	37+5	1	1+0	0	1+0	0
13	FW	(Slovakia) SVK	David Strelec	31	8	21+10	8	0+0	0	0+0	0
14	MF	(Republic of Ireland) IRL	Alex Gilbert	21	1	8+12	1	1+0	0	0+0	0
15	DF	(England) ENG	Finley Munroe	3	0	0+3	0	0+0	0	0+0	0
16	MF	(Republic of Ireland) IRL	Alan Browne	38	4	25+12	4	1+0	0	0+0	0
17	FW	(England) ENG	Micah Hamilton	5	0	1+3	0	0+0	0	0+1	0
18	MF	(United States) USA	Aidan Morris	40	0	35+3	0	1+0	0	0+1	0
20	FW	(Senegal) SEN	Kaly Sène	27	2	5+22	2	0+0	0	0+0	0
22	FW	(Australia) AUS	Samuel Silvera	23	2	8+14	2	1+0	0	0+0	0
23	MF	(England) ENG	Leo Castledine	8	1	1+7	1	0+0	0	0+0	0
24	DF	(Sierra Leone) SLE	Alex Bangura	13	1	8+5	1	0+0	0	0+0	0
25	DF	(England) ENG	George Edmundson	7	0	3+4	0	0+0	0	0+0	0
26	DF	(Republic of Ireland) IRL	Darragh Lenihan	2	0	1+1	0	0+0	0	0+0	0
27	FW	(Curaçao) CUW	Sontje Hansen	18	1	4+13	1	0+1	0	0+0	0
28	MF	(England) ENG	Law McCabe	1	0	0+0	0	0+0	0	1+0	0
29	DF	(France) FRA	Adilson Malanda	21	0	19+1	0	1+0	0	0+0	0
31	GK	(England) ENG	Sol Brynn	46	0	45+0	0	1+0	0	0+0	0
40	DF	(England) ENG	George McCormick	2	0	0+1	0	0+0	0	1+0	0
44	FW	(England) ENG	Cruz Ibeh	2	0	0+1	0	0+1	0	0+0	0
45	FW	(Ecuador) ECU	Jeremy Sarmiento	16	0	5+11	0	0+0	0	0+0	0
47	DF	(England) ENG	Archie Baptiste	1	0	0+1	0	0+0	0	0+0	0
Players who featured but departed the club on loan during the season:
10	FW	(Suriname) SUR	Delano Burgzorg	27	2	11+14	2	0+1	0	1+0	0
21	FW	(Finland) FIN	Marcus Forss	2	0	0+1	0	0+0	0	0+1	0
30	DF	(Brazil) BRA	Neto Borges	4	0	0+3	0	0+0	0	1+0	0
42	MF	(Ivory Coast) CIV	Abdoulaye Kanté	5	0	1+3	0	0+0	0	1+0	0
Players who featured but departed the club permanently during the season:
19	MF	(Norway) NOR	Sverre Nypan	21	0	3+17	0	0+1	0	0+0	0
20	MF	(Republic of Ireland) IRL	Finn Azaz	2	1	1+1	1	0+0	0	0+0	0
23	GK	(Australia) AUS	Tom Glover	1	0	0+0	0	0+0	0	1+0	0

=== Disciplinary record ===
As of match played 25 April 2026

Rank	No.	Pos.	Nat.	Player	Championship			FA Cup			EFL Cup			Total		
Rank	No.	Pos.	Nat.	Player	Yellow card	(yellow card) (yellow-red card)	Red card	Yellow card	(yellow card) (yellow-red card)	Red card	Yellow card	(yellow card) (yellow-red card)	Red card	Yellow card	(yellow card) (yellow-red card)	Red card
1	12	DF	(England)	Luke Ayling	9	0	0	0	0	0	0	0	0	9	0	0
2	2	DF	(England)	Callum Brittain	7	0	0	0	0	0	0	0	0	7	0	0
3	5	DF	(Canada)	Alfie Jones	3	0	1	0	0	0	0	0	0	3	0	1
3	9	FW	(Scotland)	Tommy Conway	6	0	0	0	0	0	0	0	0	6	0	0
3	14	MF	(Republic of Ireland)	Alex Gilbert	5	0	0	1	0	0	0	0	0	6	0	0
6	3	DF	(England)	Matt Targett	5	0	0	0	0	0	0	0	0	5	0	0
7	7	MF	(England)	Hayden Hackney	4	0	0	0	0	0	0	0	0	4	0	0
7	11	FW	(England)	Morgan Whittaker	4	0	0	0	0	0	0	0	0	4	0	0
7	18	MF	(United States)	Aidan Morris	4	0	0	0	0	0	0	0	0	4	0	0
7	29	DF	(France)	Adilson Malanda	4	0	0	0	0	0	0	0	0	4	0	0
11	8	MF	(Australia)	Riley McGree	3	0	0	0	0	0	0	0	0	3	0	0
11	22	FW	(Australia)	Samuel Silvera	3	0	0	0	0	0	0	0	0	3	0	0
13	10	FW	(Suriname)	Delano Burgzorg	1	0	0	1	0	0	0	0	0	2	0	0
13	13	FW	(Slovakia)	David Strelec	2	0	0	0	0	0	0	0	0	2	0	0
13	16	MF	(Republic of Ireland)	Alan Browne	2	0	0	0	0	0	0	0	0	2	0	0
13	19	MF	(Norway)	Sverre Nypan	2	0	0	0	0	0	0	0	0	2	0	0
13	20	FW	(Senegal)	Kaly Sène	2	0	0	0	0	0	0	0	0	2	0	0
18	6	DF	(England)	Dael Fry	1	0	0	0	0	0	0	0	0	1	0	0
18	25	DF	(England)	George Edmundson	1	0	0	0	0	0	0	0	0	1	0	0
18	26	DF	(Republic of Ireland)	Darragh Lenihan	1	0	0	0	0	0	0	0	0	1	0	0
18	27	FW	(Curaçao)	Sontje Hansen	1	0	0	0	0	0	0	0	0	1	0	0
18	31	GK	(England)	Sol Brynn	1	0	0	0	0	0	0	0	0	1	0	0
18	42	MF	(Ivory Coast)	Abdoulaye Kanté	0	0	0	0	0	0	1	0	0	1	0	0
18	45	FW	(Ecuador)	Jeremy Sarmiento	1	0	0	0	0	0	0	0	0	1	0	0
Totals					72	0	1	2	0	0	1	0	0	75	0	1
