= Archie Baptiste =

English footballer (born 2006)

Personal information
- Full name: Archie Baptiste Chaplin
- Date of birth: 28 October 2005 (age 21)
- Place of birth: England
- Position: Centre-back

Team information
- Current team: Harrogate Town
- Number: 35

Youth career
- 2016–2020: Chelsea
- 2020–2025: Tottenham Hotspur

Senior career*
Years	Team	Apps	(Gls)
2025–2026	Middlesbrough	1	(0)
2026	→ Rochdale (loan)	0	(0)
2026-	Harrogate Town	9	(1)
- * Club domestic league appearances and goals as of 17:00, 24 September 2026 (UTC)

Archie Baptiste Chaplin (née Chaplin; born 28 October 2005) is an English professional footballer who plays as a centre-back for National League club Harrogate Town.

== Club career ==
A youth product of Chelsea, Baptiste joined the youth academy of Tottenham Hotspur in 2020. On 12 June 2023, he signed his first professional contract with Spurs. He was released by Spurs on 31 May 2025.

=== Middlesbrough ===
On 4 July 2025, Baptiste joined Championship club Middlesbrough. On 29 November 2025, he made his senior and professional debut with Middlesbrough in a 2–1 EFL Championship win over Derby County.

On 27 March 2026, Baptiste joined National League leaders Rochdale on loan for the remainder of the season.

== Career statistics ==
As of match played 19 September 2026

Appearances and goals by club, season and competition
Club	Season	League			FA Cup		League Cup		Other		Total	
Club	Season	Division	Apps	Goals	Apps	Goals	Apps	Goals	Apps	Goals	Apps	Goals
Middlesbrough	2025–26	Championship	1	0	0	0	0	0	—		1	0
Harrogate Town	2026–27	National League	9	1	0	0	—		—		9	1
Career total			10	1	0	0	0	0	—		10	1

== Honours ==
Rochdale

- National League play-offs: 2026
