= El Saucejo =

El Saucejo, Spain
- town
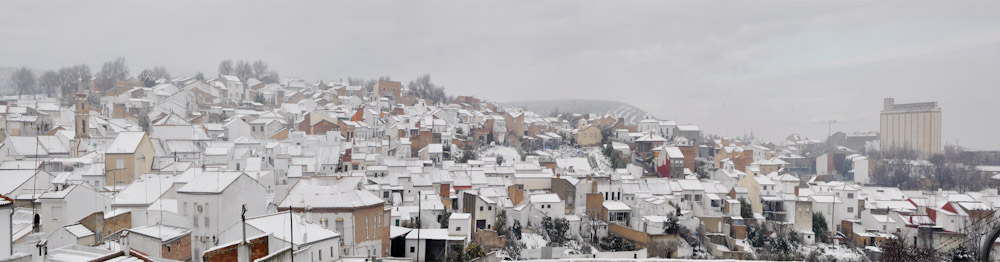
- Panoramic view of El Saucejo

- Coat of arms
- Interactive map of El Saucejo, Spain
- Coordinates: 37°04′N 5°05′W
- Country: Spain
- Province: Seville
- Municipality: El Saucejo

Area
  - Total: 92 km^{2} (36 sq mi)
- Elevation: 527 m (1,729 ft)

Population (2025-01-01)
  - Total: 4,189
  - Density: 46/km^{2} (120/sq mi)
- Time zone: UTC+1 (CET)
  - Summer (DST): UTC+2 (CEST)

El Saucejo (Spanish pronunciation: [el sawˈθexo]) is a town in the province of Seville, Spain. As of the 2005 census (INE), the city had a population of 4379.

== See also ==
- List of municipalities in Seville
