= Tomás Mejías =

Spanish footballer

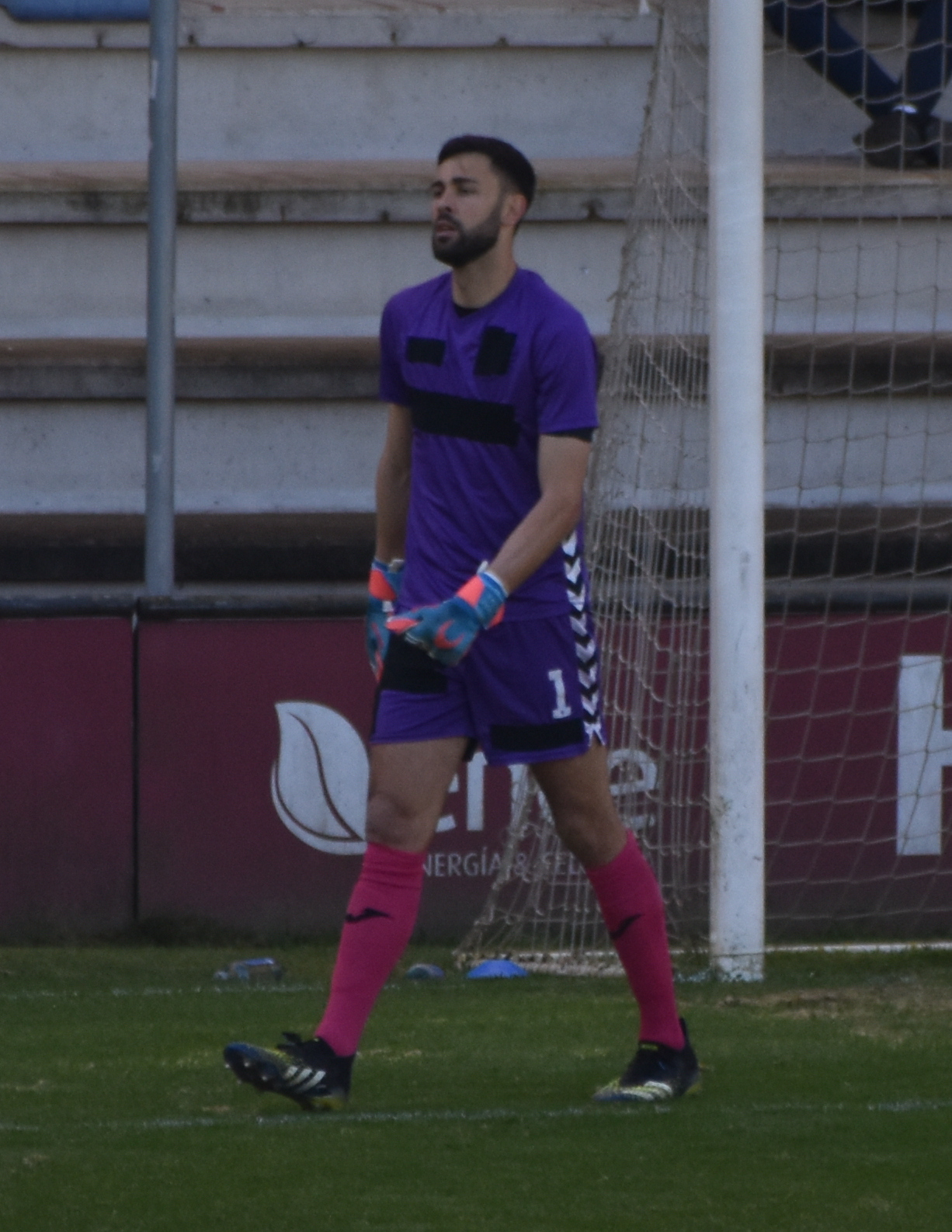
- Mejías with Ceuta in 2023

Personal information
- Full name: Tomás Mejías Osorio
- Date of birth: 30 January 1989 (age 37)
- Place of birth: Madrid, Spain
- Height: 1.94 m (6 ft 4 in)
- Position: Goalkeeper

Youth career
- 1999–2001: Coslada
- 2001–2007: Real Madrid

Senior career*
Years	Team	Apps	(Gls)
2007–2010	Real Madrid C	78	(0)
2008–2013	Real Madrid B	59	(0)
2011–2014	Real Madrid	1	(0)
2014	→ Middlesbrough (loan)	1	(0)
2014–2018	Middlesbrough	7	(0)
2017	→ Rayo Vallecano (loan)	2	(0)
2018–2019	Omonia	28	(0)
2019–2021	Middlesbrough	0	(0)
2020–2021	→ Dinamo București (loan)	10	(0)
2021	Ankaraspor	17	(0)
2021–2022	Western Sydney Wanderers	13	(0)
2023–2024	Ceuta	16	(0)
2024	Cartagena	2	(0)

International career
2008	Spain U19	2	(0)
2009	Spain U20	6	(0)
- * Club domestic league appearances and goals as of 8 June 2024

Tomás Mejías Osorio (born 30 January 1989) is a Spanish professional footballer who plays as a goalkeeper.

== Club career ==
=== Real Madrid ===
Mejías was born in Madrid. In 2001, aged 12, he joined local Real Madrid's youth academy from neighbouring amateurs CD Coslada. He made his debut with the reserves in the 2007–08 season, playing five games for them in the Segunda División B.

As first-team manager José Mourinho decided to rest Iker Casillas, Mejías was selected for a La Liga home match against Getafe CF on 10 May 2011. He replaced another club youth graduate, Antonio Adán, for the last ten minutes of a 4–0 home win.

Mejías was selected in a 20-man squad for the first match of 2011–12, away to Real Zaragoza, but eventually did not make the bench. He contributed 26 appearances the following campaign as the B's retained their Segunda División status.

=== Middlesbrough ===
On 11 February 2014, Mejías joined Championship club Middlesbrough on loan until the end of the season. He made his debut on 1 March, in a 1–0 away loss against Sheffield Wednesday. It was his only appearance during the time of his loan, as he dislocated a finger in training and was sidelined for the rest of the campaign.

The deal was made permanent on 4 July 2014, and Mejías signed a two-year contract. On 28 October of the following year, he saved from Wayne Rooney and Ashley Young as his team won in a penalty shoot-out away to Manchester United in the fourth round of the League Cup, also keeping a clean sheet for 120 minutes.

On 5 January 2017, Mejías was loaned to Rayo Vallecano until the end of the Spanish second-tier season. At the end of the following campaign, he was released by Middlesbrough.

=== Omonia ===
Mejías signed for Cypriot First Division club AC Omonia on 10 July 2018. He played 29 matches in all competitions in his only season, where his team finished sixth in the domestic league.

=== Return to Middlesbrough ===
Mejías returned to Middlesbrough on 4 July 2019, agreeing to a two-year deal. In September 2020, he was loaned to FC Dinamo București of the Romanian Liga I.

=== Later career ===
Mejías joined Turkish TFF First League side Ankaraspor in January 2021. He switched teams and countries again in October, signing for Western Sydney Wanderers FC in the Australian A-League.

On 4 January 2023, Mejías returned to Spain six years after leaving, agreeing to a contract at Primera Federación club AD Ceuta FC. On 1 February 2024, having become a backup to new signing Pedro López, he returned to the professional leagues on a five-month deal at second-tier FC Cartagena.

== Career statistics ==
As of 21 May 2019

Appearances and goals by club, season and competition
Club	Season	League			National Cup (Note: Appearances in FA Cup)		League Cup (Note: Appearances in League Cup)		Other		Total	
Club	Season	Division	Apps	Goals	Apps	Goals	Apps	Goals	Apps	Goals	Apps	Goals
Real Madrid Castilla	2007–08	Segunda División B	5	0	—		—		—		5	0
Real Madrid Castilla	2010–11	Segunda División B	11	0	—		—		2 (Note: Appearances in Segunda División B play-offs)	0	13	0
Real Madrid Castilla	2011–12	Segunda División B	17	0	—		—		2	0	19	0
Real Madrid Castilla	2012–13	Segunda División	26	0	—		—		—		26	0
Real Madrid Castilla	Total		59	0	—		—		4	0	63	0
Real Madrid	2010–11	La Liga	1	0	0	0	—		—		1	0
Real Madrid	2011–12	La Liga	0	0	0	0	—		—		0	0
Real Madrid	Total		1	0	0	0	—		—		1	0
Middlesbrough (loan)	2013–14	Championship	1	0	—		—		—		1	0
Middlesbrough	2014–15	Championship	7	0	3	0	0	0	0	0	10	0
Middlesbrough	2015–16	Championship	0	0	1	0	5	0	—		6	0
Middlesbrough	2016–17	Premier League	0	0	0	0	0	0	—		0	0
Middlesbrough	2017–18	Championship	0	0	0	0	0	0	—		0	0
Middlesbrough	Total		8	0	4	0	5	0	0	0	17	0
Rayo Vallecano (loan)	2016–17	Segunda División	2	0	—		—		—		2	0
Middlesbrough U21	2017–18	—			—		—		1 (Note: Appearance in EFL Trophy)	0	1	0
Omonia	2018–19	Cypriot First Division	28	0	1	0	—		—		29	0
Career total			98	0	5	0	5	0	5	0	113	0

== Honours ==
Real Madrid Castilla

- Segunda División B: 2011–12

Spain U20

- Mediterranean Games: 2009
