= 2019–20 Middlesbrough F.C. season =

Middlesbrough
2019–20 season
- Chairman: Steve Gibson
- Manager: Jonathan Woodgate (until 23 June 2020); Neil Warnock (from 23 June 2020)
- Stadium: Riverside Stadium
- EFL Championship: 17th
- FA Cup: Third round
- EFL Cup: First round
- Top goalscorer: League: Ashley Fletcher (11); All: Ashley Fletcher (13)
Home colours	Away colours	Third colours

The 2019–20 season was Middlesbrough's third consecutive season in the Championship in their 144th year in existence, the club also competed in the FA Cup and the EFL Cup. The season covered the period from 1 July 2019 to 20 July 2020.

George Friend continues as the official club captain in his first full season in the role, having previously replaced a departing Grant Leadbitter in the second half of the 2018–19 season, who left to return to Sunderland in January 2019.

This season also marked Jonathan Woodgate's first spell in charge of a professional club, who replaced an outgoing Tony Pulis, who left at the end of his contract. Woodgate was sacked as manager on 23 June 2020, with Middlesbrough only outside the Championship relegation zone on goal difference after 38 games. He was replaced with experienced manager Neil Warnock on the same day.

== Squad ==
No.	Name	Nationality	Position(s)	Date of birth (age)	Contract until	Signed from
Goalkeepers
1	Tomás Mejías	(Spain)	GK	30 January 1989 (aged 30)	30 June 2021	(Cyprus) Omonia
23	Darren Randolph	(Republic of Ireland)	GK	12 May 1987 (aged 32)	30 June 2021	West Ham United
42	Aynsley Pears	(England)	GK	23 April 1998 (aged 21)	30 June 2020	Academy
Defenders
2	Anfernee Dijksteel	(Netherlands)	RB	27 October 1996 (aged 22)	30 June 2022	Charlton Athletic
3	George Friend (c)	(England)	LB	17 October 1987 (aged 31)	30 June 2020	Doncaster Rovers
4	Daniel Ayala	(Spain)	CB	7 November 1990 (aged 28)	30 June 2020	Norwich City
5	Ryan Shotton	(England)	RB / CB	30 October 1988 (aged 30)	30 June 2020	Birmingham City
6	Dael Fry	(England)	CB / RB	30 August 1997 (aged 21)	30 June 2021	Academy
25	Nathan Wood	(England)	CB	31 May 2002 (aged 17)	30 June 2020	Academy
27	Marc Bola	(England)	LB	9 December 1997 (aged 21)	30 June 2022	Blackpool
29	Djed Spence	(England)	RB / LB	9 August 2000 (aged 18)	30 June 2020	Fulham
33	Hayden Coulson	(England)	LB / LM	17 June 1998 (aged 21)	30 June 2023	Academy
Midfielders
7	Marcus Tavernier	(England)	LW	22 March 1999 (aged 20)	30 June 2021	Academy
8	Adam Clayton	(England)	DM / CM	14 January 1989 (aged 30)	30 June 2021	Huddersfield Town
10	Marcus Browne	(England)	AM / RW / LW	18 December 1997 (aged 21)	30 June 2023	West Ham United
16	Jonny Howson	(England)	CM	21 May 1988 (aged 31)	30 June 2020	Norwich City
17	Paddy McNair	(Northern Ireland)	DM / CM	27 April 1995 (aged 24)	30 June 2022	Sunderland
21	Marvin Johnson	(England)	LW / LB	1 December 1990 (aged 28)	30 June 2020	Oxford United
22	George Saville	(England)	CM / LW	1 June 1993 (aged 26)	30 June 2022	Millwall
26	Lewis Wing	(England)	AM / CM	23 May 1995 (aged 24)	30 June 2022	Shildon
32	Stephen Wearne	(England)	AM	16 December 2000 (aged 18)	30 June 2020	Academy
34	Connor Malley	(England)	CM	20 March 2000 (aged 19)	30 June 2022	Academy
37	Ben Liddle	(England)	DM	21 September 1998 (aged 20)	30 June 2020	Academy
—	Patrick Roberts	(England)	RW / CF	5 February 1997 (aged 22)	30 June 2020	Manchester City
Strikers
9	Britt Assombalonga	(Democratic Republic of the Congo)	CF	6 December 1992 (aged 26)	30 June 2021	Nottingham Forest
11	Ashley Fletcher	(England)	CF	2 October 1995 (aged 23)	30 June 2021	West Ham United
14	Rudy Gestede	(Benin)	CF	10 October 1988 (aged 30)	30 June 2020	Aston Villa
36	Stephen Walker	(England)	CF	11 October 2000 (aged 18)	30 June 2023	Academy
41	Rumarn Burrell	(England)	CF	16 December 2000 (aged 18)	30 June 2022	Grimsby Town
—	Lukas Nmecha	(Germany)	CF / LW / RW	14 December 1998 (aged 20)	30 June 2020	Manchester City

- = Player on loan

== Transfers ==
=== Transfers in ===
Date from	Position	Nationality	Name	From	Fee	Team	Ref.
1 July 2019	CF	(England)	Rumarn Burrell	Grimsby Town	Undisclosed	Academy	
4 July 2019	GK	(Spain)	Tomás Mejías	(Cyprus) Omonia	Free	First team	
26 July 2019	AM	(England)	Marcus Browne	West Ham United	Undisclosed	First team	
28 July 2019	LB	(England)	Marc Bola	Blackpool	Undisclosed	First team	
7 August 2019	RB	(Netherlands)	Anfernee Dijksteel	Charlton Athletic	Undisclosed	First team	
16 January 2020	GK	(Austria)	Dejan Stojanović	(Switzerland) St. Gallen	Undisclosed	First team	
11 March 2020	LB	(France)	Williams Kokolo	Sunderland	Free transfer	Academy	

=== Transfers out ===
Date from	Position	Nationality	Name	To	Fee	Team	Ref.
1 July 2019	DF	(England)	Kieran Charlton	Free agent	Released	Academy	
1 July 2019	LM	(England)	Stewart Downing	Blackburn Rovers	Free	First team	
1 July 2019	CB	(England)	Nathan Guru	Free agent	Released	Academy	
1 July 2019	GK	(Greece)	Dimitrios Konstantopoulos	Hartlepool United	Free	First team	
1 July 2019	GK	(England)	Andy Lonergan	Liverpool	Free	First team	
1 July 2019	CF	(England)	Gabby McGill	(Scotland) Dunfermline Athletic	Undisclosed	Academy	
1 July 2019	DM	(Nigeria)	John Obi Mikel	(Turkey) Trabzonspor	Free	First team	
1 July 2019	CM	(England)	Alex Pattison	Wycombe Wanderers	Free	Academy	
1 July 2019	CM	(England)	Dan Ward	Free agent	Released	Academy	
17 July 2019	CB	(England)	Kian Spence	Scarborough Athletic	Free	Academy	
19 July 2019	CB	(England)	Aden Flint	(Wales) Cardiff City	Undisclosed	First team	
24 July 2019	CF	(Denmark)	Martin Braithwaite	(Spain) Leganés	Undisclosed	First team	
25 July 2019	CF	(France)	Billal Brahimi	(France) Stade de Reims	Free	Academy	
26 July 2019	CF	(England)	Luke Armstrong	Salford City	Undisclosed	Academy	
15 January 2020	GK	(Republic of Ireland)	Darren Randolph	(England) West Ham United	£4,000,000	First team	
31 January 2020	LB	(Scotland)	Patrick Reading	(England) Stevenage	Undisclosed	Academy	
27 June 2020	ST	(Benin)	Rudy Gestede	Free agent	Released	First team	
28 June 2020	CB	(Spain)	Daniel Ayala	Free agent	Released	First team	
28 June 2020	ST	(England)	Mitchell Curry	Free agent	Released	First team	
28 June 2020	CB	(England)	Nathan Dale	Free agent	Released	First team	
28 June 2020	CB	(Luxembourg)	Enes Mahmutovic	Free agent	Released	First team	
28 June 2020	CM	(England)	Layton Watts	Free agent	Released	First team	
28 June 2020	AM	(England)	Stephen Wearne	Free agent	Released	First team	
28 June 2020	RB	(England)	Harold Essien	Free agent	Released	First team	
28 June 2020	GK	(England)	Harry Flatters	Free agent	Released	First team	

=== Loans in ===
Date from	Position	Nationality	Name	From	Date until	Team	Ref.
2 January 2020	RW	(England)	Patrick Roberts	Manchester City	30 June 2020	First team	
3 January 2020	CF	(Germany)	Lukas Nmecha	Manchester City	30 June 2020	First team	
31 January 2020	AM	(Jamaica)	Ravel Morrison	Sheffield United	30 June 2020	First team	
31 January 2020	CB	(Cameroon)	Harold Moukoudi	(France) Saint-Étienne	30 June 2020	First team	

=== Loans out ===
Date from	Position	Nationality	Name	To	Date until	Team	Ref.
1 July 2019	CF	(England)	Mitchell Curry	(Scotland) Inverness Caledonian Thistle	30 June 2020	Academy	
1 July 2019	CB	(Luxembourg)	Enes Mahmutovic	(Netherlands) MVV Maastricht	30 June 2020	Academy	
19 July 2019	CF	(England)	Tyrone O'Neill	Darlington	31 December 2019	Academy	
23 July 2019	GK	(England)	Bradley James	Gateshead	30 June 2020	Academy	
7 August 2019	CB	(England)	Sam Stubbs	(Scotland) Hamilton Academical	7 January 2020	Academy	
22 August 2019	GK	(England)	Zach Hemming	Hartlepool United	22 November 2019	Academy	
23 November 2019	GK	(England)	Zach Hemming	Blyth Spartans	30 June 2020	Academy	
7 January 2020	CB	(England)	Sam Stubbs	(Netherlands) ADO Den Haag	30 June 2020	Academy	
9 January 2020	AM	(England)	Marcus Browne	Oxford United	30 June 2020	First team	
10 January 2020	LB	(England)	Marc Bola	Blackpool	30 June 2020	First team	
10 January 2020	CF	(England)	Mitchell Curry	Gateshead	30 June 2020	Under-23s	
31 January 2020	LW	(England)	Isaiah Jones	(Scotland) St Johnstone	30 June 2020	Under-23s	
31 January 2020	DM	(England)	Ben Liddle	Scunthorpe United	30 June 2020	Under-23s	
31 January 2020	CM	(England)	Connor Malley	(Scotland) Ayr United	30 June 2020	Under-23s	
31 January 2020	SS	(England)	Stephen Walker	Crewe Alexandra	30 June 2020	First team	

== Pre-season ==
Boro announced their pre-season programme on 14 June 2019.

5 July 2019 Friendly	Grazer AK	2–0	Middlesbrough	Bad Aussee, Austria
17:00 CEST	Rother 30'; Smoljan 73'	Report		Stadium: Christof Industries Arena

10 July 2019 Friendly	Gateshead	1–3	Middlesbrough	Gateshead
19:30 BST	Thomson 48' (pen.)	Report	Howson 44'; Fletcher 66'; Johnson 87'	Stadium: Gateshead International Stadium; Referee: James Westgate

14 July 2019 Friendly	Hartlepool United	0–4	Middlesbrough	Hartlepool
13:00 BST		Report	Tavernier 5'; Gestede 36'; Flint 41'; Saville 59'	Stadium: Super 6 Stadium; Attendance: 3,173; Referee: Tony Harrington

20 July 2019 Friendly	Heidenheim	5–1	Middlesbrough	Heidenheim an der Brenz, Germany
16:00 CET	Glatzel 66', 70', 89'; Beermann 74'; Pusch 87'	Report	Busch 19' (o.g.)	Stadium: Voith-Arena; Referee: Pascal Müller

23 July 2019 Friendly	Salford City	1–3	Middlesbrough	Salford
19:30 BST	Maynard 20'	Report	Assombalonga 35', 45', 66'	Stadium: Peninsula Stadium; Referee: Paul Marsden

28 July 2019 Friendly	Middlesbrough	1–1	Saint-Étienne	Middlesbrough
15:00 BST	Wing 69'	Report	Bouanga 67' (pen.)	Stadium: Riverside Stadium; Attendance: 6,520; Referee: Andrew Madley

== Competitions ==
=== League table ===
Pos	Team	Pld	W	D	L	GF	GA	GD	Pts
14	Reading	46	15	11	20	59	58	+1	56
15	Stoke City	46	16	8	22	62	68	−6	56
16	Sheffield Wednesday	46	15	11	20	58	66	−8	56
17	Middlesbrough	46	13	14	19	48	61	−13	53
18	Huddersfield Town	46	13	12	21	52	70	−18	51
19	Luton Town	46	14	9	23	54	82	−28	51
20	Birmingham City	46	12	14	20	54	75	−21	50

Source: EFL Official Website
Rules for classification: 1) Points; 2) Goal difference; 3) Number of goals scored; 4) Head-to-head results; 5) Wins; 6) Away goals; 7) Penalty points (sec 9.5); 8) 12-point sending off offences

==== Results by matchday ====
Round	1	2	3	4	5	6	7	8	9	10	11	12	13	14	15	16	17	18	19	20	21	22	23	24	25	26	27	28	29	30	31	32	33	34	35	36	37	38	39	40	41	42	43	44	45	46
Ground	A	H	A	H	H	A	H	A	H	H	A	H	A	H	A	A	H	H	A	H	A	A	H	H	A	A	H	A	H	H	A	A	H	A	H	H	A	H	A	A	H	A	H	A	H	A
Result	D	L	L	W	D	D	W	L	L	D	L	L	D	D	L	D	D	W	L	W	D	L	W	W	W	W	D	L	D	D	L	D	L	L	L	D	W	L	W	L	L	W	L	W	L	W
Position	13	18	22	17	17	18	13	15	19	20	20	21	21	22	22	22	21	20	20	19	20	20	20	18	16	16	16	17	17	18	18	18	18	20	21	22	19	21	19	21	22	18	19	18	19	17

Updated to match(es) played on 22 July 2020. Source:
A = Away; H = Home; W = Win; D = Draw; L = Loss

==== Result summary ====
Overall								Home						Away					
Pld	W	D	L	GF	GA	GD	Pts	W	D	L	GF	GA	GD	W	D	L	GF	GA	GD
46	13	14	19	48	61	−13	53	6	8	9	20	29	−9	7	6	10	28	32	−4

Last updated: 22 July 2020.
Source: BBC Sport

==== Matches ====
On 20 June 2019, the forthcoming Championship fixtures were unveiled.

2 August 2019 1	Luton Town	3–3	Middlesbrough	Luton
19:45 BST	Bradley 17'; Cranie 24'; Ruddock Mpanzu (yellow card) 45'; Collins (yellow card) 49' (goal) 85'	Report	Fletcher 7' (yellow card) 39'; Assombalonga 37' (penalty missed) 82'; Wing (yellow card) 61' (goal) 68'	Stadium: Kenilworth Road; Attendance: 10,053; Referee: Oliver Langford
Note: Live on Sky Sports

10 August 2019 2	Middlesbrough	0–1	Brentford	Middlesbrough
15:00 BST		Report	Watkins 54'; Dalsgaard (yellow card) 82'	Stadium: Riverside Stadium; Attendance: 21,911; Referee: Stephen Martin

17 August 2019 3	Blackburn Rovers	1–0	Middlesbrough	Blackburn
15:00 BST	Graham 25' (pen.); Cunningham (yellow card) 27'; Bennett (yellow card) 31'; Johnson (yellow card) 49'; Travis (yellow card) 69'; Williams (yellow card) 89'	Report	Dijksteel (yellow card) 24'; Ayala (yellow card) 26'; Wing (yellow card) 84'	Stadium: Ewood Park; Attendance: 14,012; Referee: Jarred Gillett

20 August 2019 4	Middlesbrough	1–0	Wigan Athletic	Middlesbrough
19:45 BST	Browne (yellow card) 21'; Assombalonga 23'; Ayala (yellow card) 45+2'	Report	Byrne (yellow card) 17'; Kipré (yellow card) 72'	Stadium: Riverside Stadium; Attendance: 18,649; Referee: Keith Stroud

24 August 2019 5	Middlesbrough	1–1	Millwall	Middlesbrough
15:00 BST	McNair 70'	Report	O'Brien (yellow card) 10'; Bradshaw 76'; Leonard (yellow card) 89'	Stadium: Riverside Stadium; Attendance: 19,279; Referee: John Brooks

31 August 2019 6	Bristol City	2–2	Middlesbrough	Bristol
12:30 BST	Palmer (yellow card) 28' (goal) 44'; Rowe 81'	Report	Wing (yellow card) 41'; Moore 64' (o.g.); Assombalonga 68'	Stadium: Ashton Gate; Attendance: 20,757; Referee: Lee Mason
Note: Live on Sky Sports

14 September 2019 7	Middlesbrough	1–0	Reading	Middlesbrough
15:00 BST	Johnson 60'	Report	McIntyre (yellow card) 27'; Boyé (yellow card) 44'; Morrison (yellow card) 59'	Stadium: Riverside Stadium; Attendance: 19,414; Referee: Robert Jones

21 September 2019 8	Cardiff City	1–0	Middlesbrough	Cardiff
15:00 BST	Fletcher 2' (o.g.); Ralls (yellow card) 87'	Report	Johnson (yellow card) 77'; Ayala (yellow card) 79'	Stadium: Cardiff City Stadium; Attendance: 23,141; Referee: Darren Bond

28 September 2019 9	Middlesbrough	1–4	Sheffield Wednesday	Middlesbrough
15:00 BST	McNair 19'	Report	Clayton 5' (o.g.); Iorfa 6'; Reach 23'; Fletcher 34'; Bannan (yellow card) 72'; Nuhiu (yellow card) 76'; Luongo (yellow card) 88'	Stadium: Riverside Stadium; Attendance: 22,075; Referee: James Linington

1 October 2019 10	Middlesbrough	1–1	Preston North End	Middlesbrough
19:45 BST	Fisher 42' (o.g.); Clayton (yellow card) 86'; Fletcher (yellow card) 90+5'	Report	Harrop 40'; Pearson (yellow card) 65'; Fisher (yellow card) 90+2'	Stadium: Riverside Stadium; Attendance: 17,961; Referee: Darren England

4 October 2019 11	Birmingham City	2–1	Middlesbrough	Bordesley
19:45 BST	Villalba 33'; Šunjić (yellow card) 86'; Bailey 89' (yellow card) 90+1'	Report	McNair (yellow card) 54'; Dijksteel (yellow card) 64'; Shotton (yellow card) 72'; Ayala 87'	Stadium: St Andrew's Trillion Trophy Stadium; Attendance: 19,703; Referee: Jeremy Simpson

19 October 2019 12	Middlesbrough	0–1	West Bromwich Albion	Middlesbrough
15:00 BST	Tavernier (yellow card) 47'; Howson (yellow card) 84'	Report	Austin (yellow card) 25'; Ferguson (yellow card) 64'; Livermore (yellow card) 80'; Robson-Kanu 82'; Hegazi (yellow card) 90+3'	Stadium: Riverside Stadium; Attendance: 20,174; Referee: Oliver Langford

23 October 2019 13	Huddersfield Town	0–0	Middlesbrough	Huddersfield
19:45 BST	Bacuna (yellow card) 90+7'	Report	Fry (yellow card) 17'; McNair (yellow card) 39'; Saville (yellow card) 84'	Stadium: John Smith’s Stadium; Attendance: 22,839; Referee: Tony Harrington

26 October 2019 14	Middlesbrough	0–0	Fulham	Middlesbrough
15:00 BST	Tavernier (yellow card) 42'; Coulson (yellow card) 45+1'; McNair (yellow card) 87'	Report	Odoi (yellow card) 7'; Rodák (red card) 17'; Reed (yellow card) 72'	Stadium: Riverside Stadium; Attendance: 19,101; Referee: Peter Bankes

2 November 2019 15	Derby County	2–0	Middlesbrough	Derby
15:00 GMT	Lawrence 22', 84'	Report	McNair (yellow card) 15'; Saville (red card) 32'	Stadium: Pride Park Stadium; Attendance: 26,293; Referee: Darren Bond

9 November 2019 16	Queens Park Rangers	2–2	Middlesbrough	Shepherd's Bush
15:00 GMT	Wells 25' (yellow card) 45+2'; Howson 44' (o.g.); Hall (yellow card) 53'; Ball (yellow card) 83'; Cameron (yellow card) 89'	Report	Assombalonga 23', 69'; Fry (yellow card) 90+2'; Randolph (yellow card) 90+4'	Stadium: Loftus Road; Attendance: 14,404; Referee: David Coote

24 November 2019 17	Middlesbrough	2–2	Hull City	Middlesbrough
12:00 GMT	Tavernier 7'; Fletcher 26'; Johnson (red card) 37'; Clayton (yellow card) 55'; Dijksteel (yellow card) 90+3'	Report	de Wijs (yellow card) 65'; Bowen 71', 75'	Stadium: Riverside Stadium; Attendance: 18,596; Referee: Jeremy Simpson

27 November 2019 18	Middlesbrough	1–0	Barnsley	Middlesbrough
19:45 GMT	Howson (yellow card) 43'; Fletcher 54'; Wing (yellow card) 64'; Bola (yellow card) 81'	Report		Stadium: Riverside Stadium; Attendance: 18,043; Referee: Oliver Langford

30 November 2019 19	Leeds United	4–0	Middlesbrough	Beeston, Leeds
15:00 BST	Bamford 3' (yellow card) 22'; Phillips (yellow card) 24'; Klich 45+3', 73'; Costa 67'	Report	McNair (yellow card) 27'; Ayala (yellow card) 65'; Howson (yellow card) 75'	Stadium: Elland Road; Attendance: 35,626; Referee: Keith Stroud

7 December 2019 20	Middlesbrough	1–0	Charlton Athletic	Middlesbrough
15:00 GMT	Saville 1'; Fletcher (yellow card) 88'	Report	Gallagher (yellow card) 54'; Pratley (yellow card) 59'; Leko (yellow card) 67'	Stadium: Riverside Stadium; Attendance: 18,681; Referee: Steve Martin

10 December 2019 21	Nottingham Forest	1–1	Middlesbrough	West Bridgford
19:45 GMT	Silva (yellow card) 27'; Yates 63'; Semedo (yellow card) 83'; Worrall (yellow card) 87'; Robinson (yellow card) 90+1'	Report	Spence (yellow card) 24'; McNair 81' (pen.); Fletcher (yellow card) 85'	Stadium: City Ground; Attendance: 24,577; Referee: Andy Woolmer

14 December 2019 22	Swansea City	3–1	Middlesbrough	Swansea
15:00 GMT	Ayew 22' (pen.), 71'; Cabango (yellow card) 48'; Dhanda (yellow card) 54'; Surridge 73'	Report	Saville (yellow card) 29'; Browne (yellow card) 52' (yellow-red card) 63'; Tavernier 59'; McNair (red card) 77'	Stadium: Liberty Stadium; Attendance: 14,625; Referee: Dean Whitestone

20 December 2019 23	Middlesbrough	2–1	Stoke City	Middlesbrough
19:45 GMT	Howson (yellow card) 43'; Fletcher 57'; Wing 71'; Saville (yellow card) 82'	Report	Ward (yellow card) 21'; Clucas 53' (yellow card) 59'; Smith (yellow card) 77'; Cousins (yellow card) 87'	Stadium: Riverside Stadium; Attendance: 18,270; Referee: Oliver Langford

26 December 2019 24	Middlesbrough	1–0	Huddersfield Town	Middlesbrough
15:00 GMT	Spence 37'; Howson (yellow card) 43'; Fletcher (yellow card) 64'; Saville (yellow card) 88'	Report	Bacuna (yellow card) 43'; Grabara (yellow card) 77'; O'Brien (yellow card) 82'; Grant (yellow card) 90'	Stadium: Riverside Stadium; Attendance: 25,313; Referee: Darren England

29 December 2019 25	West Bromwich Albion	0–2	Middlesbrough	West Bromwich
15.00 BST	Livermore (yellow card) 57'; Phillips (yellow card) 69'; Austin (yellow card) 72'; Furlong (yellow card) 82'	Report	Ayala 17'; Howson (yellow card) 48'; Spence (yellow card) 69'; Coulson (yellow card) 85'; Fletcher 90+4'	Stadium: The Hawthorns; Attendance: 25,077; Referee: Geoff Eltringham

1 January 2020 26	Preston North End	0–2	Middlesbrough	Preston
15:00 GMT		Report	Gestede 40'; Fletcher 62'; Clayton (yellow card) 64'; Johnson (yellow card) 66'	Stadium: Deepdale; Attendance: 13,824; Referee: John Brooks

11 January 2020 27	Middlesbrough	2–2	Derby County	Middlesbrough
15:00 GMT	Wing 16'; McNair 67' (pen.); Coulson (yellow card) 79'	Report	Clarke (yellow card) 39'; Waghorn (yellow card) 44'; Knight 54'; Holmes 90+1'	Stadium: Riverside Stadium; Attendance: 19,706; Referee: Tim Robinson

17 January 2020 28	Fulham	1–0	Middlesbrough	Fulham
19:45 GMT	Knockaert 6'; McDonald (yellow card) 60'	Report	McNair (yellow card) 72'	Stadium: Craven Cottage; Attendance: 18,375; Referee: David Webb

21 January 2020 29	Middlesbrough	1–1	Birmingham City	Middlesbrough
19:45 GMT	McNair (penalty missed) 23'; Fletcher 81'	Report	Jutkiewicz 27'; Gardner (yellow card) 35'	Stadium: Riverside Stadium; Attendance: 18,350; Referee: Andy Woolmer

1 February 2020 30	Middlesbrough	1–1	Blackburn Rovers	Middlesbrough
15:00 GMT	Coulson 75'	Report	Travis 58' (yellow card) 85'; Lenihan (yellow card) 87'	Stadium: Riverside Stadium; Attendance: 19,937; Referee: Matt Donohue

8 February 2020 31	Brentford	3–2	Middlesbrough	Brentford
15:00 GMT	Jeanvier 24'; Mbeumo 60'; Watkins 87'	Report	Wing 58'; Fletcher 63'; Tavernier (yellow card) 68'	Stadium: Griffin Park; Attendance: 12,285; Referee: Peter Bankes

11 February 2020 32	Wigan Athletic	2–2	Middlesbrough	Wigan
19:45 GMT	Morsy 29'; Dunkley (yellow card) 38' (yellow-red card) 62'; Kipré (yellow card) 54'; Pilkington (yellow card) 64'; Williams (yellow card) 69'; Naismith (yellow card) 70'; Moukoudi 76' (o.g.); Massey (yellow card) 90+1'	Report	Moukoudi (yellow card) 59'; Wing 64', 68'; Saville (yellow card) 72'; Howson (yellow card) 87'	Stadium: DW Stadium; Attendance: 9,023; Referee: Oliver Langford

15 February 2020 33	Middlesbrough	0–1	Luton Town	Middlesbrough
15:00 GMT	Wing (yellow card) 90+7'	Report	Tunnicliffe 17'; Cranie (yellow card) 38'; Berry (yellow card) 43'; Mpanzu (yellow card) 78'; Brown (yellow card) 90+7'	Stadium: Riverside Stadium; Attendance: 19,734; Referee: Jarred Gillet

22 February 2020 34	Barnsley	1–0	Middlesbrough	Barnsley
15:00 GMT	Chaplin 73'; Woodrow (yellow card) 78'; Bähre (yellow card) 89'	Report		Stadium: Oakwell; Attendance: 16,106; Referee: Geoff Eltringham

26 February 2020 35	Middlesbrough	0–1	Leeds United	Middlesbrough
19:45 GMT	Saville (yellow card) 10'; Moukoudi (yellow card) 82'; Clayton (yellow card) 90'	Report	Klich 45+1'	Stadium: Riverside Stadium; Attendance: 24,647; Referee: Gavin Ward

2 March 2020 36	Middlesbrough	2–2	Nottingham Forest	Middlesbrough
19:45 GMT	Gestede 40'; Wing 44'; Shotton (yellow card) 75'	Report	Yates 29'; Grabban 86'	Stadium: Riverside Stadium; Attendance: 18,884; Referee: Darren England

7 March 2020 37	Charlton Athletic	0–1	Middlesbrough	Charlton
15:00 GMT	Purrington (yellow card) 45'; Taylor (yellow card) 53'; Matthews (yellow card) 63'	Report	Shotton (yellow card) 11'; McNair 17'	Stadium: The Valley; Attendance: 18,080; Referee: Stephen Martin

20 June 2020 38	Middlesbrough	0–3	Swansea City	Middlesbrough
15:00 BST	Nmecha (yellow card) 45+4'; Roberts (yellow card) 75'	Report	Brewster 18', 21'; Ayew 34' (pen.); Kalulu (yellow card) 45+3'	Stadium: Riverside Stadium; Attendance: 0 Referee: Tony Harrington
Note: Season was suspended until 3 April 2020, due to the COVID-19 pandemic. The match was rescheduled to 20 June.

27 June 2020 39	Stoke City	0–2	Middlesbrough	Stoke-on-Trent
15:00 BST	Powell (yellow card) 88' (yellow-red card) 89'	Report	Fletcher 29'; Tavernier 62'; Wing (yellow card) 83'	Stadium: Bet365 Stadium; Attendance: 0 Referee: Matt Donohue
Note: Season was suspended until 3 April 2020, due to the COVID-19 pandemic. The match was rescheduled to 27 June.

2 July 2020 40	Hull City	2–1	Middlesbrough	Kingston upon Hull
17:00 BST	Kane 8'; Wilks (yellow card) 45+3', (goal) 90+1'	Report	Assombalonga 4' (pen.); Tavernier (yellow card) 90+5'	Stadium: KCOM Stadium; Attendance: 0 Referee: Geoff Eltringham
Note: Season was suspended until 3 April 2020, due to the COVID-19 pandemic. The match was rescheduled to 2 July.

5 July 2020 41	Middlesbrough	0–1	Queens Park Rangers	Middlesbrough
15:00 BST	Johnson (yellow card) 38'; Saville (yellow card) 51'; Assombalonga (yellow card) 89'	Report	Hugill 32'	Stadium: Riverside Stadium; Attendance: 0 Referee: Scott Duncan
Note: On 3 April, the English Football League decided to postpone all football until safe to do so due to the COVID-19 pandemic. The match was rescheduled to 5 July.

8 July 2020 42	Millwall	0–2	Middlesbrough	Bermondsey
19:45 BST	Cooper (yellow card) 86'	Report	Assombalonga (yellow card) 66', (goal) 68'; Saville (yellow card) 70'; Fletcher 87' (pen.); Howson (yellow card) 90+2'	Stadium: The Den; Attendance: 0 Referee: Tim Robinson
Note: On 3 April, the English Football League decided to postpone all football until safe to do so due to the COVID-19 pandemic. The match was rescheduled to 8 July.

11 July 2020 43	Middlesbrough	1–3	Bristol City	Middlesbrough
15:00 BST	Johnson (yellow card) 54'; Assombalonga 82'	Report	Wells 6', 79'; Paterson 42'	Stadium: Riverside Stadium; Attendance: 0 Referee: Darren England
Note: On 3 April, the English Football League decided to postpone all football until safe to do so due to the COVID-19 pandemic. The match was rescheduled to 11 July.

14 July 2020 44	Reading	1–2	Middlesbrough	Reading
20:00 BST	Pușcaș (yellow card) 19'; Moore 33'; Rinomhota (yellow card) 58'	Report	Fletcher 45'; Roberts 82'	Stadium: Madejski Stadium; Attendance: 0 Referee: Andy Woolmer
Note: On 3 April, the English Football League decided to postpone all football until safe to do so due to the COVID-19 pandemic. The match was rescheduled to 14 July.

18 July 2020 45	Middlesbrough	1–3	Cardiff City	Middlesbrough
15:00 BST	Saville (yellow card) 1'; Friend (yellow card) 19'; Howson (yellow card) 77' (yellow-red card) 89'; Assombalonga 85'	Report	Morrison 4', (yellow card) 84'; Murphy 47', 81'; Bacuna (yellow card) 90'	Stadium: Riverside Stadium; Attendance: 0 Referee: Jeremy Simpson
Note: On 3 April, the English Football League decided to postpone all football until safe to do so due to the COVID-19 pandemic. The match was rescheduled to 18 July.

22 July 2020 46	Sheffield Wednesday	1–2	Middlesbrough	Owlerton
19:30 BST	Murphy 10'	Report	McNair 22'; Assombalonga 90+3'	Stadium: Hillsborough; Attendance: 0 Referee: Jarred Gillett
Note: On 3 April, the English Football League decided to postpone all football until safe to do so due to the COVID-19 pandemic. The match was rescheduled to 22 July.

=== FA Cup ===
The third round draw was made live on BBC Two from Etihad Stadium, Micah Richards and Tony Adams conducted the draw.

5 January 2020 Third round	Middlesbrough	1–1	Tottenham Hotspur	Middlesbrough
14:01 GMT	Fletcher 50'; Saville (yellow card) 85'	Report	Alli (yellow card) 45'; Lucas Moura 61'; Lamela (yellow card) 85'	Stadium: Riverside Stadium; Attendance: 26,693; Referee: Stuart Attwell

14 January 2020 Third round replay	Tottenham Hotspur	2–1	Middlesbrough	Tottenham
20:05 GMT	Lo Celso 2'; Lamela 15'	Report	Saville 83'	Stadium: Tottenham Hotspur Stadium; Attendance: 49,202; Referee: Craig Pawson

=== EFL Cup ===
The first round draw was made on 20 June.

13 August 2019 First round	Middlesbrough	2–2 (2–4 p)	Crewe Alexandra	Middlesbrough
19:45 BST	Saville (yellow card) 60'; Fletcher 75'; Bola 90+1'	Report	Porter 42'; Kirk 45+1'; Ng (yellow card) 69'	Stadium: Riverside Stadium; Referee: Michael Salisbury
	Penalties
	Assombalonga (penalty missed); Fletcher (penalty scored); McNair (penalty scored); Browne (penalty missed)		Porter (penalty scored); Green (penalty scored); Pickering (penalty scored); Jones (penalty scored)
