= 2020–21 Middlesbrough F.C. season =

Middlesbrough
2020–21 season
- Chairman: Steve Gibson
- Manager: Neil Warnock
- Stadium: Riverside Stadium
- Championship: 10th
- FA Cup: Third round
- EFL Cup: Second round
- Top goalscorer: League: Duncan Watmore (9 goals); All: Duncan Watmore (9 goals)
Home colours	Away colours	Third colours

The 2020–21 season was Middlesbrough's fourth consecutive season in the Championship in their 145th year in existence, the club also competed in the FA Cup and EFL Cup.

== 2020–21 Season ==
During the 2020–21 season, Middlesbrough Football Club competed in the EFL Championship, the second tier of English football. The team was led by manager Neil Warnock, and concluded the season in 10th place, achieving 18 wins, 10 draws, and 18 losses. The season was marked by a strong defensive performance but was undercut by inconsistency in attack, which ultimately led to the team missing out on a playoff position for promotion to the Premier League.

The campaign was heavily influenced by the ongoing COVID-19 pandemic, leading to a modified schedule and games being played without fans for a significant part of the season. Despite these challenges, Middlesbrough maintained a mid-table position, steering clear of the relegation battle but also not managing to secure a place in the top six for much of the season.

== Changes ==
As a result of the coronavirus pandemic, football in the 2019–20 season in multiple countries was halted in order to convey safety regulations, with football returning in England on 17 June for Premier League clubs and 20 June for Championship clubs; the decision was made for the premature conclusion of the League One and League Two seasons, with the final table would be calculated by a points-per-game method with the play-offs being played as normal. As a Championship club, Middlesbrough resumed play, their first game back in action in three months being a 3–0 defeat to Swansea City. With Middlesbrough already engaged in a surprising relegation battle, chairman Steve Gibson sacked club manager Jonathan Woodgate, which came as a surprise to supporters, with heavily experienced Neil Warnock, who had been linked with the club on numerous occasions, replacing him on the same day on a contract until the end of the season.

With the pandemic resulting in the delay of the season, the season's remaining matches continued past 30 June, the date which signifies the conclusion of an English football season as a whole, also including the date that sees players with expiring contracts being allowed to leave the club on a free transfer. This occurred heavily at Middlesbrough, with Rudy Gestede, Daniel Ayala, Mitchell Curry, Nathan Dale, Enes Mahmutovic, Layton Watts, Stephen Wearne, Harold Essien, Harry Flatters all departing. On the same day as the final game of the 2019–20 season, Adam Clayton announced his departure from the club through social media, with the club confirming this the following day.

== First team squad ==
No.	Player name	Nationality	Position(s)	Date of birth (age)	Contract until	Signed from
Goalkeepers
1	Marcus Bettinelli	(England)	GK	24 May 1992 (age 34)	30 June 2021	Fulham
13	Jordan Archer	(Scotland)	GK	12 April 1993 (age 33)	30 June 2021	(Scotland) Motherwell
32	Dejan Stojanović	(North Macedonia)	GK	19 July 1993 (age 32)	30 June 2023	(Switzerland) St. Gallen
Defenders
2	Anfernee Dijksteel	(Netherlands)	RB	27 October 1996 (age 29)	30 June 2022	Charlton Athletic
4	Grant Hall	(England)	CB	29 October 1991 (age 34)	30 June 2023	Queens Park Rangers
6	Dael Fry	(England)	CB / RB	30 August 1997 (age 28)	30 June 2021	Academy
15	Nathan Wood	(England)	CB	31 May 2002 (age 24)	30 June 2020	Academy
17	Paddy McNair	(Northern Ireland)	CB / DM	27 April 1995 (age 31)	30 June 2022	Sunderland
27	Marc Bola	(England)	LB	9 December 1997 (age 28)	30 June 2022	Blackpool
29	Djed Spence	(England)	RB / LB	9 August 2000 (age 25)	30 June 2020	Fulham
33	Hayden Coulson	(England)	LB / LM	17 June 1998 (age 28)	30 June 2023	Academy
Midfielders
3	Marvin Johnson	(England)	LW / LB	1 December 1990 (age 35)	30 June 2020	Oxford United
5	Sam Morsy	(Egypt)	DM	10 September 1991 (age 34)	30 June 2023	Wigan Athletic
7	Marcus Tavernier	(England)	LW	22 March 1999 (age 27)	30 June 2021	Academy
8	Lewis Wing	(England)	AM / CM	23 May 1995 (age 31)	30 June 2022	Shildon
12	Marcus Browne	(England)	AM / RW / LW	18 December 1997 (age 28)	30 June 2023	West Ham United
16	Jonny Howson	(England)	CM	21 May 1988 (age 38)	30 June 2020	Norwich City
18	Duncan Watmore	(England)	RW	March 8, 1994 (age 32)	January 2021	Free Agent
19	Patrick Roberts	(England)	RW	February 5, 1997 (age 29)	30 June 2021	Manchester City
22	George Saville	(Northern Ireland)	CM / LW	1 June 1993 (age 33)	30 June 2022	Millwall
24	Sam Folarin	(England)	RW	23 September 2000 (age 25)	30 June 2021	Tooting & Mitcham United
34	Connor Malley	(England)	CM	20 March 2000 (age 26)	30 June 2022	Academy
37	Ben Liddle	(England)	DM	21 September 1998 (age 27)	30 June 2020	Academy
Forwards
9	Britt Assombalonga	(Democratic Republic of the Congo)	CF	6 December 1992 (age 33)	30 June 2021	Nottingham Forest
10	Chuba Akpom	(England)	CF	October 9, 1995 (age 30)	30 June 2023	(Greece) PAOK
11	Ashley Fletcher	(England)	CF / LW	2 October 1995 (age 30)	30 June 2021	West Ham United
36	Stephen Walker	(England)	CF	11 October 2000 (age 25)	30 June 2023	Academy
41	Rumarn Burrell	(England)	CF	16 December 2000 (age 25)	30 June 2022	Grimsby Town

== Statistics ==
As of 21 March 2021

No.	Pos	Nat	Player	Total		Championship		FA Cup		EFL Cup	
No.	Pos	Nat	Player	Apps	Goals	Apps	Goals	Apps	Goals	Apps	Goals
1	GK	(England) ENG	Marcus Bettinelli	39	0	38+0	0	0+0	0	1+0	0
2	DF	(Netherlands) NED	Anfernee Dijksteel	31	0	29+0	0	0+0	0	2+0	0
3	MF	(England) ENG	Marvin Johnson	36	5	18+17	4	0+0	0	1+0	1
4	DF	(England) ENG	Grant Hall	12	2	10+1	2	0+0	0	1+0	0
5	MF	(Egypt) EGY	Sam Morsy	30	1	27+2	1	0+0	0	1+0	0
6	DF	(England) ENG	Dael Fry	34	1	30+2	1	0+0	0	2+0	0
7	MF	(England) ENG	Marcus Tavernier	32	3	25+4	2	1+0	0	2+0	1
8	MF	(England) ENG	Lewis Wing	15	1	4+8	1	1+0	0	2+0	0
9	FW	(Democratic Republic of the Congo) COD	Britt Assombalonga	30	5	19+10	5	0+0	0	1+0	0
10	FW	(England) ENG	Chuba Akpom	33	4	17+15	4	1+0	0	0+0	0
11	FW	(England) ENG	Ashley Fletcher	12	4	5+5	2	0+0	0	2+0	2
12	MF	(England) ENG	Marcus Browne	8	2	1+4	2	1+0	0	1+1	0
13	GK	(Scotland) SCO	Jordan Archer	1	0	0+0	0	1+0	0	0+0	0
14	FW	(Democratic Republic of the Congo) COD	Yannick Bolasie	7	0	6+1	0	0+0	0	0+0	0
15	DF	(England) ENG	Nathan Wood	7	0	2+2	0	1+0	0	1+1	0
16	MF	(England) ENG	Jonny Howson	35	1	32+1	1	0+0	0	1+1	0
17	DF	(Northern Ireland) NIR	Paddy McNair	39	2	38+0	2	0+0	0	0+1	0
18	FW	(England) ENG	Duncan Watmore	22	6	15+7	6	0+0	0	0+0	0
19	FW	(England) ENG	Patrick Roberts	10	0	4+5	0	1+0	0	0+0	0
19	MF	(England) ENG	Nathaniel Mendez-Laing	8	1	1+7	1	0+0	0	0+0	0
20	DF	(England) ENG	Darnell Fisher	8	0	7+1	0	0+0	0	0+0	0
21	MF	(Democratic Republic of the Congo) COD	Neeskens Kebano	11	1	8+3	1	0+0	0	0+0	0
22	MF	(Northern Ireland) NIR	George Saville	35	5	28+7	5	0+0	0	0+0	0
24	MF	(England) ENG	Sam Folarin	4	1	0+2	0	0+1	1	0+1	0
27	DF	(England) ENG	Marc Bola	35	1	33+0	1	1+0	0	1+0	0
29	DF	(England) ENG	Djed Spence	34	1	18+14	1	1+0	0	1+0	0
32	GK	(North Macedonia) MKD	Dejan Stojanović	1	0	0+0	0	0+0	0	1+0	0
33	DF	(England) ENG	Hayden Coulson	12	0	3+7	0	1+0	0	1+0	0
34	MF	(England) ENG	Hayden Hackney	1	0	0+0	0	1+0	0	0+0	0
37	MF	(England) ENG	Isaiah Jones	1	0	0+0	0	0+1	0	0+0	0
39	FW	(England) ENG	Rumarn Burrell	1	0	0+0	0	0+1	0	0+0	0

=== Goals record ===
As of 21 March 2021

Rank	No.	Nat.	Po.	Name	Championship	FA Cup	EFL Cup	Total
1	18	(England)	CF	Duncan Watmore	9	0	0	9
2	3	(England)	LW	Marvin Johnson	4	0	1	5
2	9	(Democratic Republic of the Congo)	CF	Britt Assombalonga	5	0	0	5
2	22	(Northern Ireland)	CM	George Saville	5	0	0	5
5	10	(England)	CF	Chuba Akpom	4	0	0	4
5	11	(England)	CF	Ashley Fletcher	2	0	2	4
6	7	(England)	LW	Marcus Tavernier	2	0	1	3
7	4	(England)	CB	Grant Hall	2	0	0	2
7	12	(England)	AM	Marcus Browne	2	0	0	2
7	17	(Northern Ireland)	CB	Paddy McNair	2	0	0	2
10	5	(Egypt)	DM	Sam Morsy	1	0	0	1
10	6	(England)	CB	Dael Fry	1	0	0	1
10	8	(England)	AM	Lewis Wing	1	0	0	1
10	16	(England)	CM	Jonny Howson	1	0	0	1
10	19	(England)	RW	Nathaniel Mendez-Laing	1	0	0	1
10	21	(Democratic Republic of the Congo)	RW	Neeskens Kebano	1	0	0	1
10	24	(England)	RW	Sam Folarin	0	1	0	1
10	27	(England)	LB	Marc Bola	1	0	0	1
10	29	(England)	RB	Djed Spence	1	0	0	1
Own Goals					4	0	0	4
Total					45	1	4	55

=== Disciplinary record ===
As of 21 March 2021

Rank	No.	Nat.	Po.	Name	Championship			FA Cup			EFL Cup			Total		
Rank	No.	Nat.	Po.	Name	Booked	(yellow card) (yellow-red card)	Sent off (straight red)	Booked	(yellow card) (yellow-red card)	Sent off (straight red)	Booked	(yellow card) (yellow-red card)	Sent off (straight red)	Booked	(yellow card) (yellow-red card)	Sent off (straight red)
1	5	(Egypt)	CM	Sam Morsy	8	0	1	0	0	0	1	0	0	9	0	1
2	16	(England)	CM	Jonny Howson	7	0	0	0	0	0	0	0	0	7	0	0
2	22	(Northern Ireland)	CM	George Saville	7	0	0	0	0	0	0	0	0	7	0	0
4	17	(Northern Ireland)	CB	Paddy McNair	5	0	1	0	0	0	0	0	0	5	0	1
4	27	(England)	LB	Marc Bola	6	0	0	0	0	0	0	0	0	6	0	0
6	2	(Netherlands)	RB	Anfernee Dijksteel	4	0	0	0	0	0	0	0	0	4	0	0
6	7	(England)	RW	Marcus Tavernier	3	0	0	1	0	0	0	0	0	4	0	0
8	1	(England)	GK	Marcus Bettinelli	3	0	0	0	0	0	0	0	0	3	0	0
9	6	(England)	CB	Dael Fry	2	0	0	0	0	0	0	0	0	2	0	0
9	9	(Democratic Republic of the Congo)	CF	Britt Assombalonga	2	0	0	0	0	0	0	0	0	2	0	0
9	10	(England)	CF	Chuba Akpom	2	0	0	0	0	0	0	0	0	2	0	0
12	3	(England)	LW	Marvin Johnson	1	0	0	0	0	0	0	0	0	1	0	0
12	11	(England)	CF	Ashley Fletcher	1	0	0	0	0	0	0	0	0	1	0	0
12	14	(Democratic Republic of the Congo)	LW	Yannick Bolasie	1	0	0	0	0	0	0	0	0	1	0	0
12	15	(England)	CB	Nathan Wood	0	0	0	0	0	0	1	0	0	1	0	0
12	20	(England)	RB	Darnell Fisher	1	0	0	0	0	0	0	0	0	1	0	0
12	29	(England)	RB	Djed Spence	1	0	0	0	0	0	0	0	0	1	0	0
12	34	(England)	CM	Hayden Hackney	0	0	0	1	0	0	0	0	0	1	0	0
Total					55	0	2	2	0	0	2	0	0	59	0	2

== Transfers ==
=== Transfers in ===
Date	Position	Nationality	Name	From	Fee	Source
14 July 2020	CF	(Republic of Ireland)	Cole Kiernan	Sunderland	Undisclosed	
31 July 2020	CB	(England)	Grant Hall	Queens Park Rangers	Free	
11 September 2020	CM	(Egypt)	Sam Morsy	Wigan Athletic	£2,000,000	
18 September 2020	CF	(England)	Chuba Akpom	(Greece) PAOK	Undisclosed	
17 November 2020	RW	(England)	Duncan Watmore	Sunderland	Free transfer	
5 January 2021	GK	(Scotland)	Jordan Archer	(Scotland) Motherwell	Free transfer	
28 January 2021	RB	(England)	Darnell Fisher	Preston North End	Undisclosed	
1 February 2021	RW	(England)	Nathaniel Mendez-Laing	(Wales) Cardiff City	Free transfer	
3 February 2021	AM	(Netherlands)	Malik Dijksteel	(Netherlands) Telstar	Free transfer	

=== Loans in ===
Date from	Position	Nationality	Name	From	Date until	Source
10 September 2020	GK	(England)	Marcus Bettinelli	Fulham	30 June 2021	
12 October 2020	RW	(England)	Patrick Roberts	Manchester City	1 February 2021	
28 January 2021	LW	(Democratic Republic of the Congo)	Yannick Bolasie	Everton	30 June 2021	
1 February 2021	AM	(Democratic Republic of the Congo)	Neeskens Kebano	Fulham	30 June 2021	

=== Loans out ===
Date from	Position	Nationality	Name	To	Date until	Source
10 September 2020	GK	(Spain)	Tomás Mejías	(Romania) Dinamo București	End of season	
2 October 2020	CM	(England)	Connor Malley	Carlisle United	1 January 2021	
16 October 2020	SS	(England)	Stephen Walker	Milton Keynes Dons	13 January 2021	
7 November 2020	GK	(England)	Brad James	Aldershot Town	End of season	
20 November 2020	CF	(England)	Tyrone O'Neill	Darlington	31 January 2021	
5 January 2021	GK	(Austria)	Dejan Stojanović	(Germany) St Pauli	End of season	
14 January 2021	CF	(England)	Rumarn Burrell	Bradford City	End of season	
22 January 2021	SS	(England)	Stephen Walker	Crewe Alexandra	End of season	
29 January 2021	RW	(England)	Isaiah Jones	(Scotland) Queen of the South	End of season	
1 February 2021	CM	(England)	Lewis Wing	Rotherham United	End of season	
1 February 2021	CB	(England)	Nathan Wood	Crewe Alexandra	End of season	
26 February 2021	GK	(England)	Sol Brynn	Darlington	End of season	
22 April 2021	GK	(England)	Brad James	Hartlepool United	End of season	

Britt Assombalonga free end of season

=== Transfers out ===
Date	Position	Nationality	Name	To	Fee	Source
1 July 2020	CB	(Spain)	Daniel Ayala	Blackburn Rovers	Free	
1 July 2020	CF	(England)	Mitchell Curry	Sunderland	Free	
1 July 2020	CB	(England)	Nathan Dale	Gateshead	Free	
1 July 2020	RB	(England)	Harold Essien	Free agent	Free	
1 July 2020	GK	(England)	Harry Flatters	York City	Free	
1 July 2020	CF	(Benin)	Rudy Gestede	(Australia) Melbourne Victory	Free	
1 July 2020	RB	(England)	Nicholas Hood	Marske United	Free	
1 July 2020	CB	(Luxembourg)	Enes Mahmutovic	(Ukraine) FC Lviv	Free	
1 July 2020	CM	(England)	Layton Watts	Free agent	Free	
1 July 2020	AM	(England)	Stephen Wearne	Sunderland	Free	
14 July 2020	CB	(England)	Ryan Shotton	(Australia) Melbourne Victory	Free	
22 July 2020	CM	(England)	Adam Clayton	Birmingham City	Free	
15 August 2020	LB	(England)	George Friend	Birmingham City	Free	
9 September 2020	CB	(England)	Sam Stubbs	Fleetwood Town	Undisclosed	
10 September 2020	GK	(England)	Joe Fryer	Swindon Town	Free	
8 October 2020	DM	(England)	Ben Liddle	Bristol Rovers	Undisclosed	
16 October 2020	GK	(England)	Aynsley Pears	Blackburn Rovers	Undisclosed	
22 January 2021	GK	(Spain)	Tomás Mejías	(Turkey) Ankaraspor	Mutual consent	

== Pre-season friendlies ==
25 August 2020 Friendly	Plymouth Argyle	0–1	Middlesbrough	Plymouth
14:00 BST		Report	Assombalonga 33'	Stadium: Home Park; Attendance: 0

1 September 2020 Friendly	Middlesbrough	5–1	Newcastle United	Hurworth-on-Tees
13:00 BST	Assombalonga 9', 23'; Tavernier 34'; Hall 50'; Walker 83' (pen.)	Report	Saint-Maximin 39'	Stadium: Rockliffe Park; Attendance: 0

== Competitions ==
=== Championship ===
==== League table ====
Pos	Team	Pld	W	D	L	GF	GA	GD	Pts
7	Reading	46	19	13	14	62	54	+8	70
8	Cardiff City	46	18	14	14	66	49	+17	68
9	Queens Park Rangers	46	19	11	16	57	55	+2	68
10	Middlesbrough	46	18	10	18	55	53	+2	64
11	Millwall	46	15	17	14	47	52	−5	62
12	Luton Town	46	17	11	18	41	52	−11	62
13	Preston North End	46	18	7	21	49	56	−7	61

Source: EFL Official Website
Rules for classification: 1) Points; 2) Goal difference; 3) Number of goals scored; 4) Head-to-head results; 5) Wins; 6) Away goals; 7) Penalty points (sec 9.5); 8) 12-point sending off offences

==== Results summary ====
Overall								Home						Away					
Pld	W	D	L	GF	GA	GD	Pts	W	D	L	GF	GA	GD	W	D	L	GF	GA	GD
46	18	10	18	55	53	+2	64	11	4	8	30	25	+5	7	6	10	25	28	−3

Last updated: 8 May 2021.

==== Results by matchday ====
Matchday	1	2	3	4	5	6	7	8	9	10	11	12	13	14	15	16	17	18	19	20	21	22	23	24	25	26	27	28	29	30	31	32	33	34	35	36	37	38	39	40	41	42	43	44	45	46
Ground	A	H	A	H	H	A	A	H	H	A	A	H	H	A	H	A	A	H	H	A	A	A	H	A	H	H	A	H	A	H	A	H	H	A	A	H	H	A	A	H	A	H	A	H	A	H
Result	L	D	D	W	D	W	D	W	W	D	D	L	W	L	W	L	L	W	W	W	L	W	L	W	L	L	D	L	L	W	W	L	D	W	L	W	W	L	L	D	L	L	W	W	D	L
Position	18	18	18	10	15	11	13	8	5	6	7	8	7	10	10	10	11	9	7	6	9	7	7	7	7	7	7	7	8	8	8	9	9	9	9	9	8	9	9	10	10	11	10	9	10	10

Updated to match(es) played on 8 May 2021. Source:
A = Away; H = Home; W = Win; D = Draw; L = Loss

==== Matches ====
The 2020–21 season fixtures were released on 21 August.

11 September 2020 1	Watford	1–0	Middlesbrough	Watford
19:45 BST	Cathcart 11'; Wilmot (yellow card) 85'	Report		Stadium: Vicarage Road; Attendance: 0 Referee: Keith Stroud

19 September 2020 2	Middlesbrough	1–1	Bournemouth	Middlesbrough
15:00 BST	Saville (yellow card) 30'; Browne 81'	Report	Solanke 38'; Mepham (yellow card) 51'; Stacey (yellow card) 63'	Stadium: Riverside Stadium; Attendance: 1,000; Referee: Matt Donohue

26 September 2020 3	Queens Park Rangers	1–1	Middlesbrough	Shepherd's Bush
15:00 BST	Osayi-Samuel 28'	Report	Akpom 19'; Dijksteel (yellow card) 85'	Stadium: Kiyan Prince Foundation Stadium; Attendance: 0 Referee: Dean Whitestone

3 October 2020 4	Middlesbrough	2–1	Barnsley	Middlesbrough
15:00 BST	Tavernier (yellow card) 9'; Morsy (yellow card) 27'; Howson 45+1' (yellow card) 52'; Akpom 48'; McNair (yellow card) 61'; Saville (yellow card) 68'; Bettinelli (yellow card) 90+1'	Report	Styles (yellow card) 49'; Woodrow 89' (pen.); Simões (yellow card) 90+2'	Stadium: Riverside Stadium; Attendance: 0 Referee: Oliver Langford

17 October 2020 5	Middlesbrough	0–0	Reading	Middlesbrough
15:00 BST	Morsy (yellow card) 75'; McNair (yellow card) 80'	Report	Moore (yellow card) 47'; Richards (yellow card) 73'; Holmes (yellow card) 76'	Stadium: Riverside Stadium; Attendance: 0 Referee: Darren Bond

20 October 2020 6	Bristol City	0–1	Middlesbrough	Ashton Gate
19:45 BST		Report	Fry (yellow card) 67'; Saville 73'; Bettinelli (yellow card) 90+2'	Stadium: Ashton Gate Stadium; Attendance: 0 Referee: Tim Robinson

24 October 2020 7	Cardiff City	1–1	Middlesbrough	Cardiff
15:00 BST	Moore (yellow card) 28'; Ojo 70'	Report	Saville 36'	Stadium: Cardiff City Stadium; Attendance: 0 Referee: John Brooks

27 October 2020 8	Middlesbrough	2–0	Coventry City	Middlesbrough
19:45 GMT	Assombalonga 81' (yellow card) 90+1'; Spence (yellow card) 90' (goal) 90+4'	Report	Maroši (yellow card) 90+4'	Stadium: Riverside Stadium; Attendance: 0 Referee: David Webb

31 October 2020 9	Middlesbrough	1–0	Nottingham Forest	Middlesbrough
15:00 GMT	Morsy (yellow card) 17'; Johnson 81'	Report	Figueiredo (yellow card) 54'; Bong (yellow card) 87'	Stadium: Riverside Stadium; Attendance: 0 Referee: Lee Mason

3 November 2020 10	Blackburn Rovers	0–0	Middlesbrough	Blackburn
19:45 GMT	Trybull (yellow card) 18'; Rankin-Costello (yellow card) 50'; Lenihan (yellow card) 78'; Wharton (yellow card) 85'; Holtby (yellow card) 90+2'	Report	McNair (yellow card) 67'	Stadium: Ewood Park; Attendance: 0 Referee: David Webb

7 November 2020 11	Brentford	0–0	Middlesbrough	Brentford
15:00 GMT	Dalsgaard (yellow card) 19'	Report		Stadium: Brentford Community Stadium; Attendance: 0 Referee: James Linington

21 November 2020 12	Middlesbrough	0–1	Norwich City	Middlesbrough
15:00 GMT	Tavernier (penalty missed) 51'	Report	Sørensen (yellow card) 15'; Pukki 72' (pen.)	Stadium: Riverside Stadium; Attendance: 0 Referee: Tony Harrington

25 November 2020 13	Middlesbrough	3–0	Derby County	Middlesbrough
19:00 GMT	Assombalonga 33'; Clarke 71' (o.g.); Johnson 83'	Report	Jóźwiak (yellow card) 9'; Lawrence (yellow card) 49'; Byrne (yellow card) 53'; Buchanan (yellow card) 65'	Stadium: Riverside Stadium; Attendance: 0 Referee: Peter Bankes

28 November 2020 14	Huddersfield Town	3–2	Middlesbrough	Huddersfield
15:00 GMT	Eiting 37'; Campbell 45' (yellow card) 66'; Bacuna (yellow card) 68'; Sarr (yellow card) 83'; Koroma 85'; Hogg (yellow card) 90+5'	Report	Johnson 14'; McNair (yellow card) 56'; Howson (yellow card) 64'; Dijksteel (yellow card) 76'; Assombalonga 83' (pen.)	Stadium: The John Smith's Stadium; Attendance: 0 Referee: John Brooks

2 December 2020 15	Middlesbrough	2–1	Swansea City	Middlesbrough
19:00 GMT	Watmore 26', 67'; Johnson (yellow card) 45'; Akpom (yellow card) 57'	Report	Fulton (yellow card) 45+2'; Dhanda 78'; Grimes (yellow card) 85'	Stadium: Riverside Stadium; Attendance: 0 Referee: Keith Stroud

5 December 2020 16	Stoke City	1–0	Middlesbrough	Stoke-on-Trent
15:00 GMT	Collins 19'; Campbell (yellow card) 69'; Brown (yellow card) 79'	Report	Fry (yellow card) 26'; Saville (yellow card) 70'; Bola (yellow card) 90+5'	Stadium: Bet365 Stadium; Attendance: 0 Referee: Jeremy Simpson

9 December 2020 17	Preston North End	3–0	Middlesbrough	Preston
19:00 GMT	Hughes 62'; Sinclair 81'; Jakobsen 83'	Report	Howson (yellow card) 22'	Stadium: Deepdale; Referee: Andrew Madley

12 December 2020 18	Middlesbrough	3–0	Millwall	Middlesbrough
15:00 GMT	Watmore 13', 20'; Tavernier 15'; Bola (yellow card) 23'	Report	Hutchinson (yellow card) 58'	Stadium: Riverside Stadium; Attendance: 0 Referee: Darren Bond

16 December 2020 19	Middlesbrough	1–0	Luton Town	Middlesbrough
19:00 GMT	Akpom 52'; Morsy (red card) 66'; Assombalonga (yellow card) 90+2'	Report	Collins (penalty missed) 67'; Rea (yellow card) 75'	Stadium: Riverside Stadium; Attendance: 0 Referee: Andy Davies

19 December 2020 20	Birmingham City	1–4	Middlesbrough	Bordesley
15:00 GMT	Colin 15'	Report	Assombalonga 27'; Saville 31'; Etheridge 56' (o.g.); Wing 82'	Stadium: St. Andrew's Stadium; Attendance: 0 Referee: Steve Martin

29 December 2020 21	Sheffield Wednesday	2–1	Middlesbrough	Owlerton
19:00 GMT	Paterson 30'; Shaw 40'; Bannan (yellow card) 45+4'	Report	Saville (yellow card) 42'; Morsy (yellow card) 45+4'; Watmore 49'	Stadium: Hillsborough; Attendance: 0 Referee: Geoff Eltringham

2 January 2021 22	Wycombe Wanderers	1–3	Middlesbrough	High Wycombe
15:00 GMT	Ikpeazu 3'; Mehmeti (yellow card) 43'; Knight (yellow card) 70'	Report	Browne 30'; Tavernier 36' (yellow card) 83'; Bola (yellow card) 65'; Bettinelli (yellow card) 69'; Akpom 81'	Stadium: Adams Park; Attendance: 0 Referee: Jarred Gillett

16 January 2021 23	Middlesbrough	0–1	Birmingham City	Middlesbrough
12:30 GMT	Dijksteel (yellow card) 82'	Report	Toral (yellow card) 15'; Hogan 26'; Šunjić (yellow card) 71'	Stadium: Riverside Stadium; Attendance: 0 Referee: Darren England

20 January 2021 24	Nottingham Forest	1–2	Middlesbrough	West Bridgford
19:00 GMT	Sow (yellow card) 33'; Taylor (yellow card) 67'; Mbe Soh 90+3'; Knockaert (yellow card) 90+3'; Ribeiro (red card) 90+5'	Report	Morsy (yellow card) 13'; Assombalonga 14'; Saville 50'; Howson (yellow card) 84'	Stadium: The City Ground; Attendance: 0 Referee: Andy Woolmer

24 January 2021 25	Middlesbrough	0–1	Blackburn Rovers	Middlesbrough
15:00 GMT	Morsy (yellow card) 57'; Tavernier (yellow card) 81'; Bola (yellow card) 88'	Report	Davenport (yellow card) 26'; Rothwell 63'	Stadium: Riverside Stadium; Attendance: 0 Referee: Dean Whitestone

27 January 2021 26	Middlesbrough	0–3	Rotherham United	Middlesbrough
19:00 GMT		Report	Crooks 43'; Smith 79' (pen.); Giles 90+2'	Stadium: Riverside Stadium; Attendance: 0 Referee: Michael Salisbury

30 January 2021 27	Norwich City	0–0	Middlesbrough	Norwich
12:30 GMT	Buendía (yellow card) 41' (yellow-red card) 67'	Report	Saville (yellow card) 73'; Howson (yellow card) 90'	Stadium: Carrow Road; Attendance: 0 Referee: Keith Stroud

6 February 2021 28	Middlesbrough	1–4	Brentford	Middlesbrough
15:00 GMT	Raya 3' (o.g.); Saville (yellow card) 29'	Report	Fosu (yellow card) 21'; Toney 38', 80'; Janelt (yellow card) 50', (goal) 58'; Jensen 64'	Stadium: Riverside Stadium; Attendance: 0 Referee: Darren Bond

13 February 2021 29	Derby County	2–1	Middlesbrough	Derby
15:00 GMT	Gregory 15'; Kazim-Richards 32'; Jóźwiak (yellow card) 35'; Knight (yellow card) 90+4'	Report	Kebano 38'; Dijksteel (yellow card) 62'	Stadium: Pride Park Stadium; Attendance: 0 Referee: Matt Donohue

16 February 2021 30	Middlesbrough	2–1	Huddersfield Town	Middlesbrough
19:45 GMT	Watmore 31'; Morsy (yellow card) 33'; Fletcher 45' (pen.); McNair (red card) 81'	Report	Mbenza 9'; O'Brien (yellow card) 70'	Stadium: Riverside Stadium; Attendance: 0 Referee: Jeremy Simpson

20 February 2021 31	Reading	0–2	Middlesbrough	Reading
15:00 GMT	Richards (yellow card) 43'; Rinomhota (yellow card) 59'	Report	Fletcher 22', (yellow card) 90+1'; Bola 29'; Howson (yellow card) 71'	Stadium: The Madejski Stadium; Attendance: 0 Referee: David Webb

23 February 2021 32	Middlesbrough	1–3	Bristol City	Middlesbrough
19:00 GMT	Bola (yellow card) 63'; Fry 80'	Report	Diédhiou 21', 33'; Wells 37'; Palmer (yellow card) 61'; Hunt (yellow card) 90+1'	Stadium: Riverside Stadium; Attendance: 0 Referee: Tim Robinson

27 February 2021 33	Middlesbrough	1–1	Cardiff City	Middlesbrough
15:00 GMT	McNair 82'	Report	Vaulks (yellow card) 30'; Morrison 37'; Bennett (yellow card) 57'; Ng (yellow card) 59'	Stadium: Riverside Stadium; Attendance: 0 Referee: Jarred Gillett

2 March 2021 34	Coventry City	1–2	Middlesbrough	Bordesley
19:00 GMT	Dijksteel 11' (o.g.); McFadzean (yellow card) 90+1'	Report	Akpom (yellow card) 31'; Hall 41'; McNair (yellow card) 54'; Saville 87'	Stadium: St. Andrew's Stadium; Attendance: 0 Referee: Graham Scott

6 March 2021 35	Swansea City	2–1	Middlesbrough	Swansea
15:00 GMT	Ayew 40', 90+7' (pen.); Manning (yellow card) 64'; Guéhi (yellow card) 71'	Report	Bolasie (yellow card) 39'; Saville (yellow card) 47'; Morsy (yellow card) 88', (goal) 90+1'; Howson (yellow card) 90+6' Neil Warnock (yellow card)	Stadium: The Liberty Stadium; Attendance: 0 Referee: Gavin Ward

13 March 2021 36	Middlesbrough	3–0	Stoke City	Middlesbrough
15:00 GMT	Hall 21'; McNair 40'; Mendez-Laing 88'	Report	Powell (yellow card) 23'	Stadium: Riverside Stadium; Attendance: 0 Referee: Andrew Madley

16 March 2021 37	Middlesbrough	2–0	Preston North End	Middlesbrough
19:00 GMT	Storey 22' (o.g.); Tavernier 51'; Fisher (yellow card) 66'	Report	Browne (red card) 36'; Potts (yellow card) 62' Alex Neil (red card)	Stadium: Riverside Stadium; Attendance: 0 Referee: Oliver Langford

20 March 2021 38	Millwall	1–0	Middlesbrough	Bermondsey
15:00 GMT	Hall 31' (o.g.); McNamara (yellow card) 35'	Report	Bola (yellow card) 20'	Stadium: The Den; Attendance: 0 Referee: James Linington

2 April 2021 39	Bournemouth	3–1	Middlesbrough	King's Park
15:00 BST	Billing 14', (yellow card) 59'; Lerma 66'; Smith (yellow card) 79'; Solanke 83'	Report	Watmore 63'; McNair (yellow card) 69'; Bola (yellow card) 90+1'	Stadium: Vitality Stadium; Attendance: 0 Referee: Simon Hooper

5 April 2021 40	Middlesbrough	1–1	Watford	Middlesbrough
12:30 BST	Bolasie 78'	Report	Chalobah (yellow card) 25'; Sarr 32'	Stadium: Riverside Stadium; Attendance: 0 Referee: Tim Robinson

10 April 2021 41	Barnsley	2–0	Middlesbrough	Barnsley
15:00 BST	Mowatt (yellow card) 31', (goal) 62'; Dike 75'	Report		Stadium: Oakwell Stadium; Attendance: 0 Referee: Keith Stroud

17 April 2021 42	Middlesbrough	1–2	Queens Park Rangers	Middlesbrough
12:30 BST	Bolasie 28'	Report	Dickie 15'; Wallace 18'; Kakay (yellow card) 31'; Dieng (red card) 58'	Stadium: Riverside Stadium; Attendance: 0 Referee: Matt Donohue

21 April 2021 43	Rotherham United	1–2	Middlesbrough	Rotherham
18:00 BST	MacDonald 3'; Crooks (red card) 18'; Lindsay (yellow card) 64'; Smith (yellow card) 76'	Report	Saville 33', (yellow card) 72'; Akpom 55'; McNair (yellow card) 90'; Kebano (yellow card) 90+1'	Stadium: New York Stadium; Attendance: 0 Referee: Darren Bond

24 April 2021 44	Middlesbrough	3–1	Sheffield Wednesday	Middlesbrough
15:00 BST	Bolasie 20'; McNair (yellow card) 27'; Coburn 73'; Watmore 81'	Report	Windass 39' (pen.)	Stadium: Riverside Stadium; Attendance: 0 Referee: Jarred Gillett

1 May 2021 45	Luton Town	1–1	Middlesbrough	Luton
15:00 BST	Rea 19', (yellow card) 75'; Collins (penalty missed) 71'	Report	Watmore 21'	Stadium: Kenilworth Road; Attendance: 0 Referee: Jeremy Simpson

8 May 2021 46	Middlesbrough	0–3	Wycombe Wanderers	Middlesbrough
12:30 BST		Report	Onyedinma 14'; McCleary 33'; Adeniran (yellow card) 45'; McCarthy 56'	Stadium: Riverside Stadium; Attendance: 0 Referee: Martin Atkinson

=== FA Cup ===
The third round draw was made on 30 November, with Premier League and EFL Championship clubs all entering the competition.

9 January 2021 Third round	Brentford	2–1	Middlesbrough	Brentford
18:00 GMT	Ghoddos (yellow card) 6', (goal) 64'; Dervişoğlu 35'	Report	Folarin 48'; Tavernier (yellow card) 78'; Hackney (yellow card) 88'	Stadium: Brentford Community Stadium; Attendance: 0 Referee: Tim Robinson

=== EFL Cup ===
The first round draw was made on 18 August, live on Sky Sports, by Paul Merson. The draw for both the second and third round were confirmed on 6 September, live on Sky Sports by Phil Babb.

4 September 2020 First round	Middlesbrough	4–3	Shrewsbury Town	Middlesbrough
17:30 BST	Johnson 21'; Fletcher 31', 53'; Tavernier 65'	Report	High 13'; Cummings 60'; Pyke 73'; Williams (yellow card) 81'	Stadium: Riverside Stadium; Attendance: 0 Referee: Michael Salisbury

15 September 2020 Second round	Middlesbrough	0–2	Barnsley	Middlesbrough
18:00 BST	Morsy (yellow card) 67'; Wood-Gordon (yellow card) 84'	Report	Schmidt 22'; Williams 34'; Halme (yellow card) 81'	Stadium: Riverside Stadium; Attendance: 0 Referee: Anthony Backhouse
