= Anfernee Dijksteel =

Surinamese footballer (born 1996)

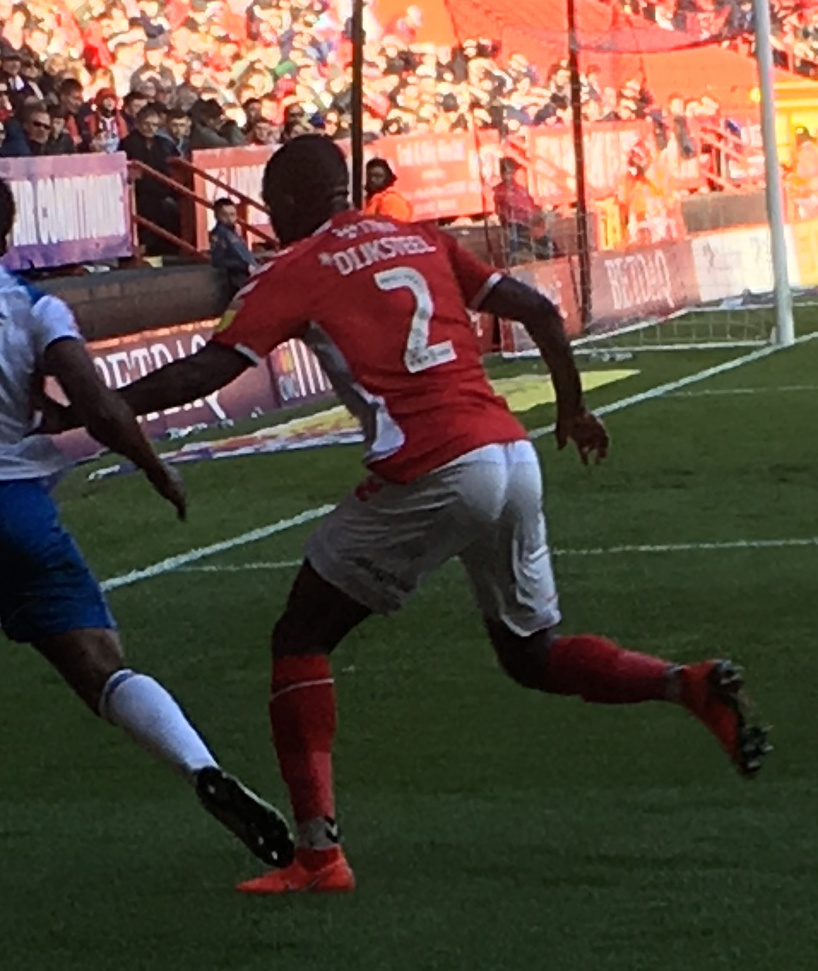
- Dijksteel playing for Charlton Athletic in 2019

Personal information
- Full name: Anfernee Jamal Dijksteel
- Date of birth: 27 October 1996 (age 30)
- Place of birth: Amsterdam, Netherlands
- Height: 1.83 m (6 ft 0 in)
- Positions: Right-back; centre-back

Team information
- Current team: Kocaelispor
- Number: 2

Youth career
- Amsterdamsche FC
- Nike Academy

Senior career*
Years	Team	Apps	(Gls)
2016–2019	Charlton Athletic	41	(1)
2019–2025	Middlesbrough	152	(2)
2025–	Kocaelispor	33	(0)

International career^{‡}
2016	Netherlands U20	1	(0)
2023–	Suriname	16	(0)
- * Club domestic league appearances and goals as of 16 August 2026 ‡ National team caps and goals as of 05:55, 4 November 2025 (UTC)

Anfernee Jamal Dijksteel (born 27 October 1996) is a professional footballer who plays as a right-back or centre-back for Süper Lig club Kocaelispor. Born in the Netherlands, he plays for the Suriname national team.

== Club career ==
Born in Amsterdam, Dijksteel started his career in the youth team at Amsterdamsche FC before moving to England to play for the Nike Academy.

=== Charlton Athletic ===
He signed for Charlton Athletic development squad in January 2016, having played against the side in a friendly whilst playing for the Nike Academy. He remained with the development squad until the end of the season before being promoted to the first team on a number of occasions during the 2016–17 season. After impressing for Jason Euell's side he was rewarded in February 2017 with a new three-and-a-half contract extension. In August 2017, he finally made his first team debut for the Addicks in a 2–1 victory over Exeter City in the EFL Cup. He scored his first goal on Easter Monday, 22 April 2019, opening the scoring against Scunthorpe United in a 4–0 Charlton win.

=== Middlesbrough ===
On 7 August 2019, he was signed by Championship rivals Middlesbrough for £2m. He scored his first goal for the club on 14 August 2024 in an EFL Cup tie against Leeds United.

== Personal life ==
He is the older brother of fellow professional footballer Malik Dijksteel who plays for St Mirren, with the pair being teammates from 2021 to 2022 when Malik also played for Middlesbrough.

== International career ==
Dijksteel was born in the Netherlands and is of Surinamese descent. In March 2016, he received a call-up to the Netherlands under-20 side for a friendly against Portugal. He went on to start in the match which finished as a 1–1 draw.

On 9 March 2023, Dijksteel received his first international call-up to Suriname.

== Career statistics ==
As of match played 16 August 2026

Appearances and goals by club, season and competition
Club	Season	League			Cup		League Cup		Other		Total	
Club	Season	Division	Apps	Goals	Apps	Goals	Apps	Goals	Apps	Goals	Apps	Goals
Charlton Athletic	2015–16	Championship	0	0	0	0	0	0	0	0	0	0
Charlton Athletic	2016–17	League One	0	0	0	0	0	0	0	0	0	0
Charlton Athletic	2017–18	League One	10	0	1	0	2	0	6 (Note: Five appearances in EFL Trophy and one in League One play-offs)	0	19	0
Charlton Athletic	2018–19	League One	30	1	3	0	1	0	5 (Note: Two appearances in EFL Trophy and three in League One play-offs)	0	39	1
Charlton Athletic	2019–20	Championship	1	0	0	0	0	0	0	0	1	0
Charlton Athletic	Total		41	1	4	0	3	0	11	0	59	1
Middlesbrough	2019–20	Championship	16	0	0	0	1	0	0	0	17	0
Middlesbrough	2020–21	Championship	29	0	0	0	2	0	0	0	31	0
Middlesbrough	2021–22	Championship	34	0	4	0	0	0	0	0	38	0
Middlesbrough	2022–23	Championship	20	0	0	0	1	0	1 (Note: One appearance in Championship play-offs)	0	22	0
Middlesbrough	2023–24	Championship	20	0	0	0	3	0	0	0	23	0
Middlesbrough	2024–25	Championship	33	2	1	0	2	1	0	0	36	3
Middlesbrough	Total		152	2	5	0	9	1	1	0	167	3
Kocaelispor	2025–26	Süper Lig	32	0	4	0	—		—		36	0
Kocaelispor	2026–27	Süper Lig	1	0	0	0	—		—		1	0
Kocaelispor	Total		33	0	4	0	0	0	0	0	37	0
Career total			226	3	13	0	12	1	12	0	263	4

== Honours ==
Charlton Athletic

- EFL League One play-offs: 2019
