= Paddy McNair =

Northern Irish footballer (born 1995)

- McNair with Hull City in 2026

Personal information
- Full name: Patrick James Coleman McNair
- Date of birth: 27 April 1995 (age 31)
- Place of birth: Ballyclare, Northern Ireland
- Height: 6 ft 2 in (1.88 m)
- Position: Defender

Team information
- Current team: Hull City
- Number: 17

Youth career
- 2006–2011: Ballyclare Colts
- 2011–2014: Manchester United

Senior career*
Years	Team	Apps	(Gls)
2014–2016	Manchester United	24	(0)
2016–2018	Sunderland	25	(5)
2018–2024	Middlesbrough	198	(14)
2024–2025	San Diego FC	23	(0)
2024	→ West Bromwich Albion (loan)	2	(0)
2026–	Hull City	13	(0)

International career^{‡}
2009–2010	Northern Ireland U16	7	(0)
2011	Northern Ireland U17	1	(0)
2012–2013	Northern Ireland U19	5	(0)
2014	Northern Ireland U21	2	(0)
2015–	Northern Ireland	85	(7)
- * Club domestic league appearances and goals as of 20:45, 22 August 2026 (UTC) ‡ National team caps and goals as of 16:25, 6 October 2026 (UTC)

Patrick James Coleman McNair (born 27 April 1995) is a Northern Irish professional footballer who plays as a centre-back or right-back for Premier League club Hull City and the Northern Ireland national team.

McNair signed for Manchester United in 2011 and made his professional debut for them in the Premier League in September 2014. In August 2016, McNair joined Sunderland with Donald Love in a joint transfer deal for £5.5 million. Two years later, he signed for Middlesbrough. After racking up a total of 219 domestic appearances across six seasons, he moved to American side San Diego FC in July 2024, immediately moving to West Bromwich Albion on loan until December 2024.

Having represented Northern Ireland at under-17, under-19 and under-21 levels, McNair made his senior debut for Northern Ireland in March 2015. He was selected in their squad at UEFA Euro 2016, where they reached the Round of 16.

== Club career ==
=== Manchester United ===
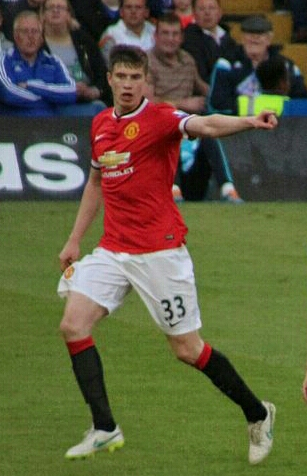
McNair playing for Manchester United in 2015.

Born in Ballyclare, County Antrim, McNair began playing with Ballyclare Colts and was first discovered by Manchester United's Northern Ireland-based scout, Tony Coulter, when McNair was 12, and began travelling to train with United during his school holidays. He eventually signed for the club in 2011, having impressed the club scouts in a midfield role for Ballyclare Colts, but was later converted into a defender by United youth coach Paul McGuinness. While making the transition from midfield to defence, McNair was frequently compared to Michael Carrick by McGuinness.

McNair made his senior debut for United on 27 September 2014 against West Ham United in a 2–1 victory in the Premier League at Old Trafford, starting the game due to an injury crisis in defence. He was praised by fans and manager Louis van Gaal for his solid defending in that match, including a vital headed clearance while United were down to 10 men.

Despite McNair's inexperience in England's top division, Manchester United won all of the first four matches when McNair was in the starting line-up. On 4 January 2015, McNair was in the starting line-up for a FA Cup third round tie with Yeovil Town which concluded with a 2–0 result, playing as a right-back in a 3–5–2 formation. He started again in the same formation and role for a later round of the tournament against Cambridge United that ended 3–0. Following his impressive performance, Van Gaal publicly praised McNair and claimed that he could go on and establish himself as the new Gary Neville, suggesting he could be a regular in that position for the next decade. On 10 February 2015, he signed a new contract with Manchester United, keeping him at the club until June 2017.

On 28 November 2015, after being kept out of the starting line-up by the consistency and form of Manchester United's back four, McNair made his first start of the 2015–16 season for Manchester United alongside team-mates Daley Blind and Chris Smalling in a three-man defence against Leicester City. The match ended in a 1–1 draw.

=== Sunderland ===
On 11 August 2016, McNair signed a four-year contract with Sunderland after a £5.5 million joint deal was agreed with Manchester United for McNair and Donald Love. Two days later, he made his debut in an away fixture against Manchester City, coming on as a substitute in the 83rd-minute for Jermain Defoe. The match eventually ended 2–1 in Manchester City's favour, with McNair netting an own goal during his defence against a cross from Jesús Navas. McNair scored a brace for Sunderland in their 2–1 EFL Cup third round win against Queens Park Rangers on 21 September, his first two professional goals. On 20 November, McNair ruptured his ACL in a 3–0 win over Hull City and Sunderland stated it was likely that he would miss the remainder of the season.

After over 11 months absence, McNair returned to action on 28 October 2017, playing 11 minutes as a substitute in a 2–1 home loss to Bristol City in the Championship. Three days later he scored his first league goal of his career, equalising in a 3–3 draw with Bolton Wanderers at the Stadium of Light four minutes after coming on in place of Darron Gibson. The Sunderland Echo praised his second season, which ended with the club's second consecutive relegation.

=== Middlesbrough ===
On 26 June 2018, McNair signed a four-year deal at Championship club Middlesbrough, for a fee that could rise past £5 million. He made his debut in the first game of the season, a 3–0 win over Sheffield United on 7 August, in which he came on in the 71st minute for Jonathan Howson. He scored his first goal for Middlesbrough in a 1–1 draw with Millwall on 24 August. On 22 May 2021, McNair was named Middlesbrough Player of the Year for the 2020–21 season.

In May 2024, McNair confirmed that he would leave Middlesbrough at the expiration of his contract in the summer.

=== San Diego FC ===
On 25 July 2024, Major League Soccer club, San Diego FC announced the signing of McNair on an initial three-year contract ahead of their inaugural season. Upon his arrival, he was confirmed to have returned to England, joining West Bromwich Albion on loan until 31 December 2024.

=== Hull City ===
On 28 January 2026, McNair signed an 18-month contract with Hull City. He made his debut on 7 February in the 2–3 home defeat against Bristol City.

== International career ==
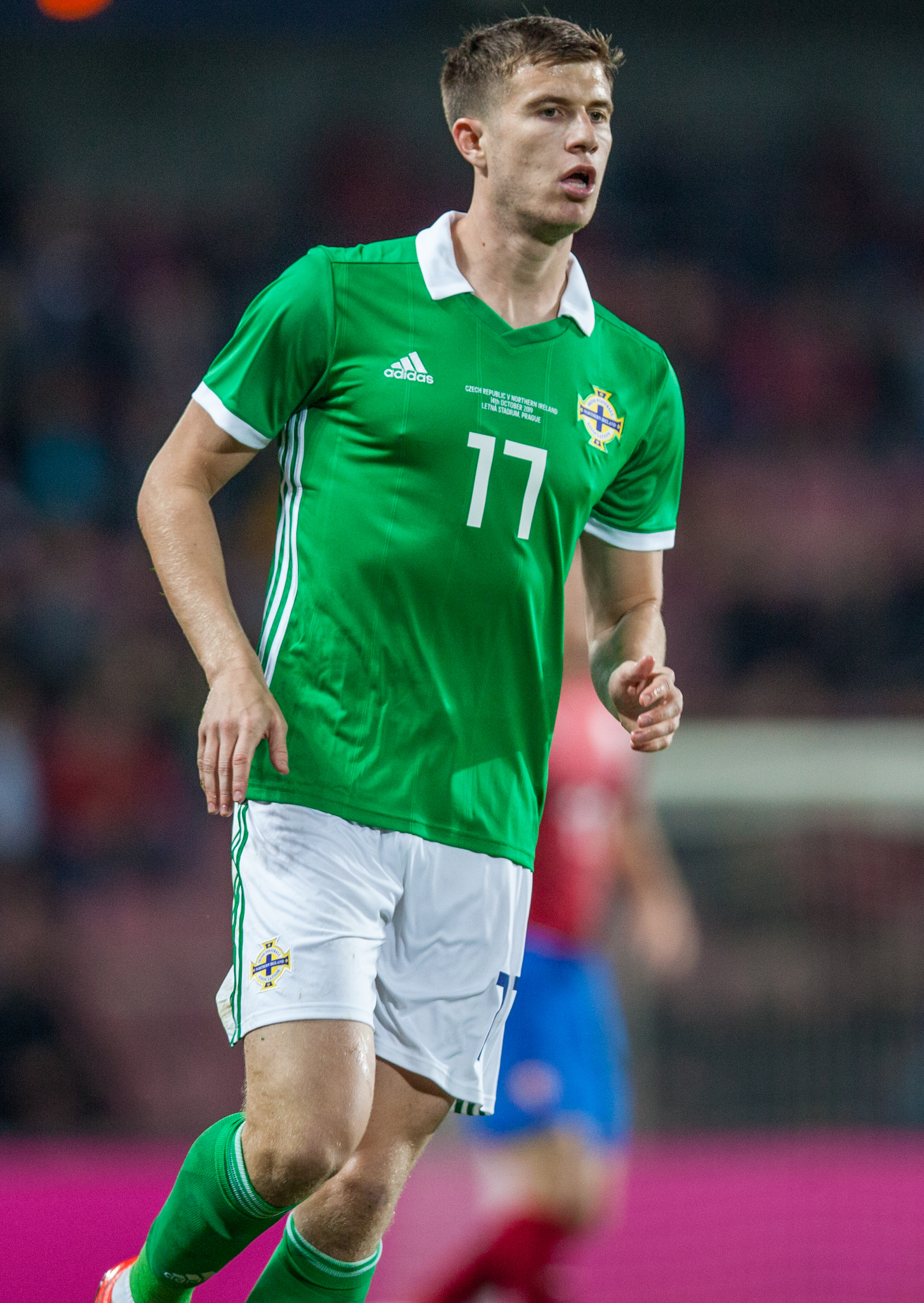
McNair playing for Northern Ireland in 2019.

On 4 November 2014, McNair was called up to the Northern Ireland senior team for the first time, ahead of a UEFA Euro 2016 qualifying match away to Romania, but did not play. He made his debut on 25 March 2015 in a friendly against Scotland at Hampden Park, playing the entirety of a 1–0 defeat. He made his competitive debut on 4 September 2015 in a 3–1 away win over the Faroe Islands in a European qualifier.

On 8 October 2015, McNair was drafted into the starting line-up for a UEFA Euro 2016 qualifying match against Greece. Northern Ireland went on to secure a decisive 3–1 victory, qualifying for the competition, a first major tournament the team would have qualified for in thirty years. After the final qualifying match, a 1–1 away draw with Finland on 11 October 2015, McNair remained in a Helsinki hospital due to concerns of a ruptured liver.

On 24 March 2016, McNair was selected in the starting line-up for an international friendly against Wales, which subsequently ended in a 1–1 draw. Notably, McNair was deployed in a holding midfielder role instead of his more conventional position as a central defender. Following his display in the match, Northern Ireland head coach, Michael O'Neill, "believes midfield could be where McNair's future lies".

On 28 May 2016, McNair was selected as part of the 23-man squad to represent Northern Ireland at UEFA Euro 2016. He was selected to start for Northern Ireland's opener against Poland in Nice, but was substituted at half time for compatriot Stuart Dallas in an eventual 1–0 loss. He came on in added time for the next match, in a 2–0 win over Ukraine, but did not feature again for the rest of the competition. The Northern Ireland national team was eventually eliminated in the Round of 16, after a 1–0 loss to Wales.

McNair scored his first international goal against Belarus in a UEFA Euro 2020 qualifier on 11 June 2019, and followed it up with two more in a 3–2 friendly win away to the Czech Republic on 14 October.

== Career statistics ==
=== Club ===
As of match played 25 August 2026

Appearances and goals by club, season and competition
Club	Season	League			FA Cup		League Cup		Europe		Other		Total	
Club	Season	Division	Apps	Goals	Apps	Goals	Apps	Goals	Apps	Goals	Apps	Goals	Apps	Goals
Manchester United	2014–15	Premier League	16	0	2	0	0	0	—		—		18	0
Manchester United	2015–16	Premier League	8	0	0	0	0	0	1 (Note: Appearance in UEFA Europa League)	0	—		9	0
Manchester United	Total		24	0	2	0	0	0	1	0	—		27	0
Sunderland	2016–17	Premier League	9	0	0	0	3	2	—		—		12	2
Sunderland	2017–18	Championship	16	5	0	0	0	0	—		—		16	5
Sunderland	Total		25	5	0	0	3	2	—		—		28	7
Middlesbrough	2018–19	Championship	16	0	3	0	4	0	—		—		23	0
Middlesbrough	2019–20	Championship	41	6	2	0	1	0	—		—		44	6
Middlesbrough	2020–21	Championship	46	2	0	0	1	0	—		—		47	2
Middlesbrough	2021–22	Championship	42	5	4	0	0	0	—		—		46	5
Middlesbrough	2022–23	Championship	32	1	1	0	1	0	—		—		34	1
Middlesbrough	2023–24	Championship	21	0	0	0	4	0	—		—		25	0
Middlesbrough	Total		198	14	10	0	11	0	—		—		219	14
West Bromwich Albion (loan)	2024–25	Championship	2	0	0	0	1	0	—		—		3	0
Hull City	2025–26	Championship	12	0	1	0	0	0	—		2 (Note: Appearances in EFL Championship play-offs)	0	15	0
Hull City	2026–27	Premier League	1	0	0	0	1	0	—		—		2	0
Hull City	Total		13	0	1	0	1	0	—		2	0	17	0
Career total			262	19	13	0	16	2	1	0	2	0	295	21

=== International ===
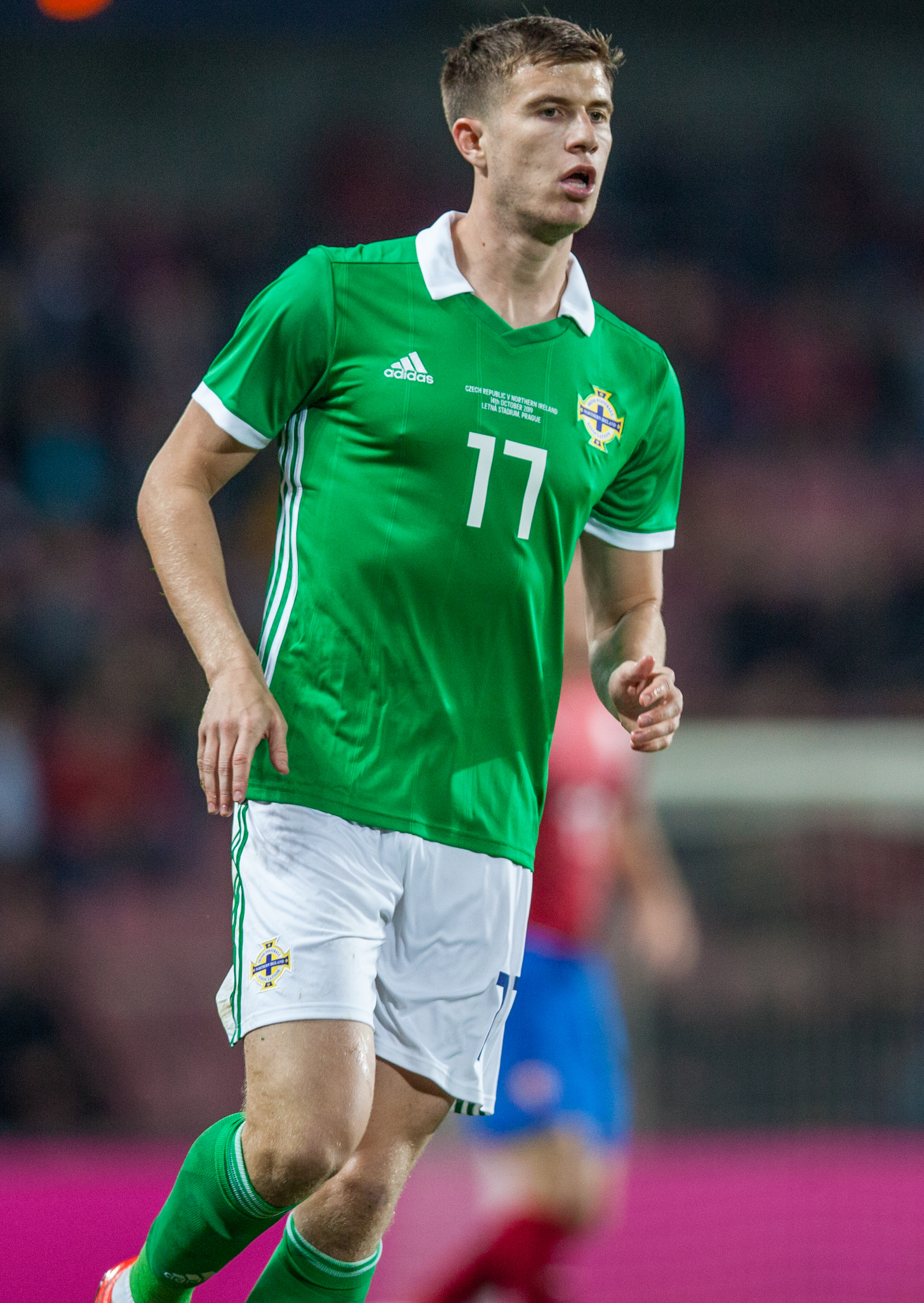
McNair playing for Northern Ireland in 2019

As of match played 5 October 2026

Appearances and goals by national team and year
National team	Year	Apps	Goals
Northern Ireland	2015	4	0
Northern Ireland	2016	11	0
Northern Ireland	2017	1	0
Northern Ireland	2018	8	0
Northern Ireland	2019	9	3
Northern Ireland	2020	8	1
Northern Ireland	2021	10	1
Northern Ireland	2022	7	1
Northern Ireland	2023	9	0
Northern Ireland	2024	6	1
Northern Ireland	2025	8	0
Northern Ireland	2026	4	0
Total		85	7

Scores and results list Northern Ireland's goal tally first, score column indicates score after each McNair goal.

List of international goals scored by Paddy McNair
No.	Date	Venue	Opponent	Score	Result	Competition
1	11 June 2019	Borisov Arena, Barysaw, Belarus	Belarus	1–0	1–0	UEFA Euro 2020 qualifying
2	14 October 2019	Stadion Letná, Prague, Czech Republic	Czech Republic	1–0	3–2	Friendly
3	14 October 2019	Stadion Letná, Prague, Czech Republic	Czech Republic	3–0	3–2	Friendly
4	7 September 2020	Windsor Park, Belfast, Northern Ireland	Norway	1–1	1–5	2020–21 UEFA Nations League B
5	2 September 2021	LFF Stadium, Vilnius, Lithuania	Lithuania	4–1	4–1	2022 FIFA World Cup qualification
6	12 June 2022	Windsor Park, Belfast, Northern Ireland	Cyprus	1–2	2–2	2022–23 UEFA Nations League C
7	5 September 2024	Windsor Park, Belfast, Northern Ireland	Luxembourg	1–0	2–0	2024-25 UEFA Nations League C

== Honours ==
Hull City

- EFL Championship play-offs: 2026

Individual

- Middlesbrough Player of the Year: 2020–21
