= Duncan Watmore =

English former professional footballer

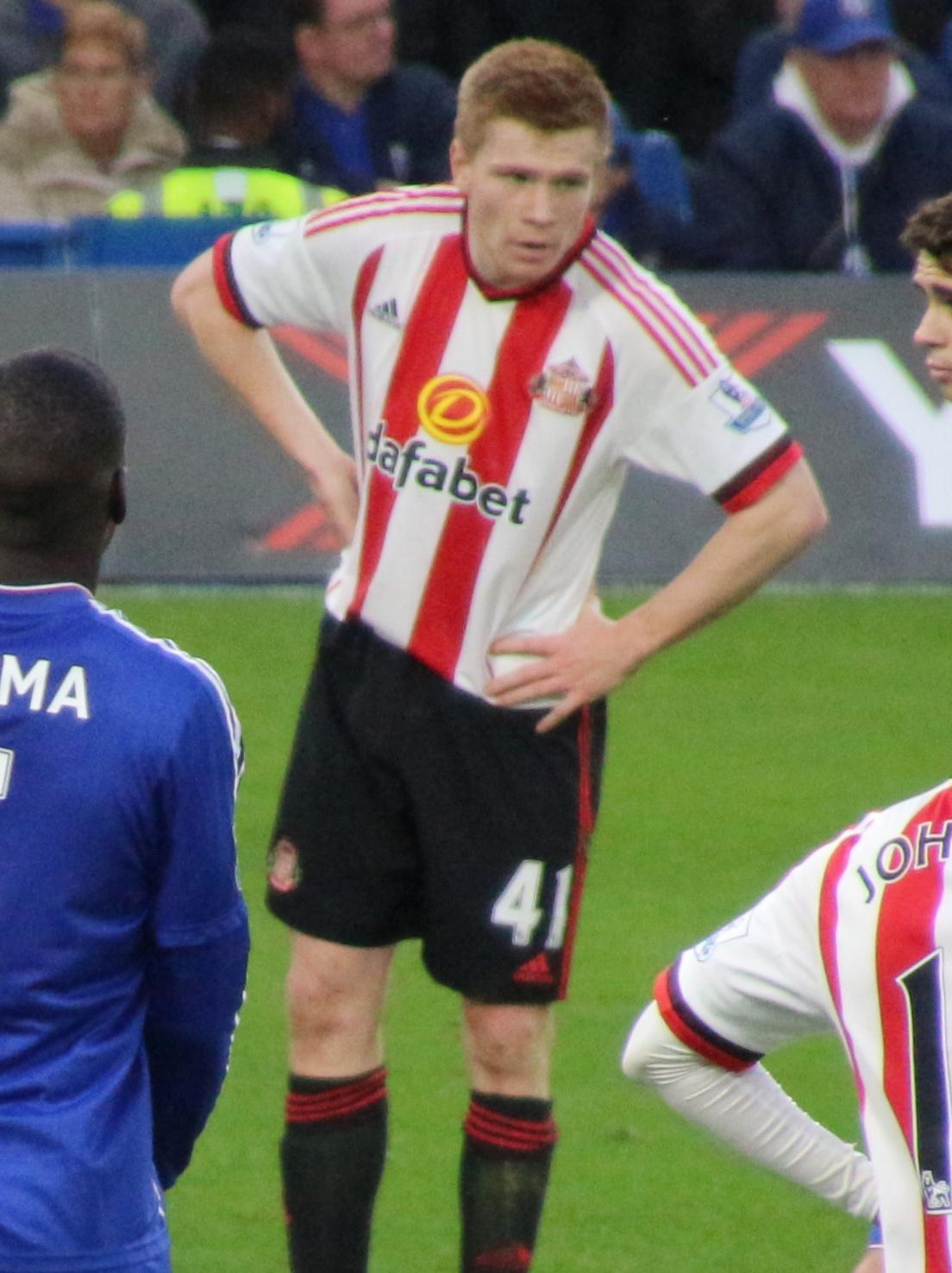
- Watmore playing for Sunderland in 2015

Personal information
- Full name: Duncan Ian Watmore
- Date of birth: 8 March 1994 (age 32)
- Place of birth: Manchester, England
- Height: 5 ft 9 in (1.75 m)
- Position: Forward

Youth career
- –2006: Manchester United
- 2010–2011: Altrincham

Senior career*
Years	Team	Apps	(Gls)
2011–2013	Altrincham	48	(15)
2012	→ Clitheroe (loan)	4	(0)
2012	→ Curzon Ashton (loan)		
2013–2020	Sunderland	71	(5)
2014	→ Hibernian (loan)	9	(1)
2020–2023	Middlesbrough	92	(21)
2023–2025	Millwall	76	(11)
2026	Rotherham United	13	(0)

International career
2015	England U20	5	(2)
2015–2016	England U21	13	(3)
- * Club domestic league appearances and goals as of 2 May 2026 (UTC)

Duncan Ian Watmore (born 8 March 1994) is an English former professional footballer who played as a forward.

Watmore played for Altrincham, Sunderland, Middlesbrough, Millwall and Rotherham United, with loans at Hibernian, Clitheroe & Curzon Ashton.

== Early life ==
Watmore was born in Manchester and is the son of Ian Watmore, a former chief executive of the Football Association. He was educated at Cheadle Hulme School.

== Career ==
=== Early career ===
Watmore started his career at Manchester United, but was released at the age of 12. He joined Altrincham in their youth team at the age of 16. He made his first-team debut on 27 November 2011 as a substitute in a 2–1 away defeat to F.C. United of Manchester in the FA Trophy. Watmore had spells on loan at Northern Premier League Division One North clubs Clitheroe and Curzon Ashton in early 2012. He scored 14 goals for Altrincham in the 2012–13 season.

=== Sunderland ===
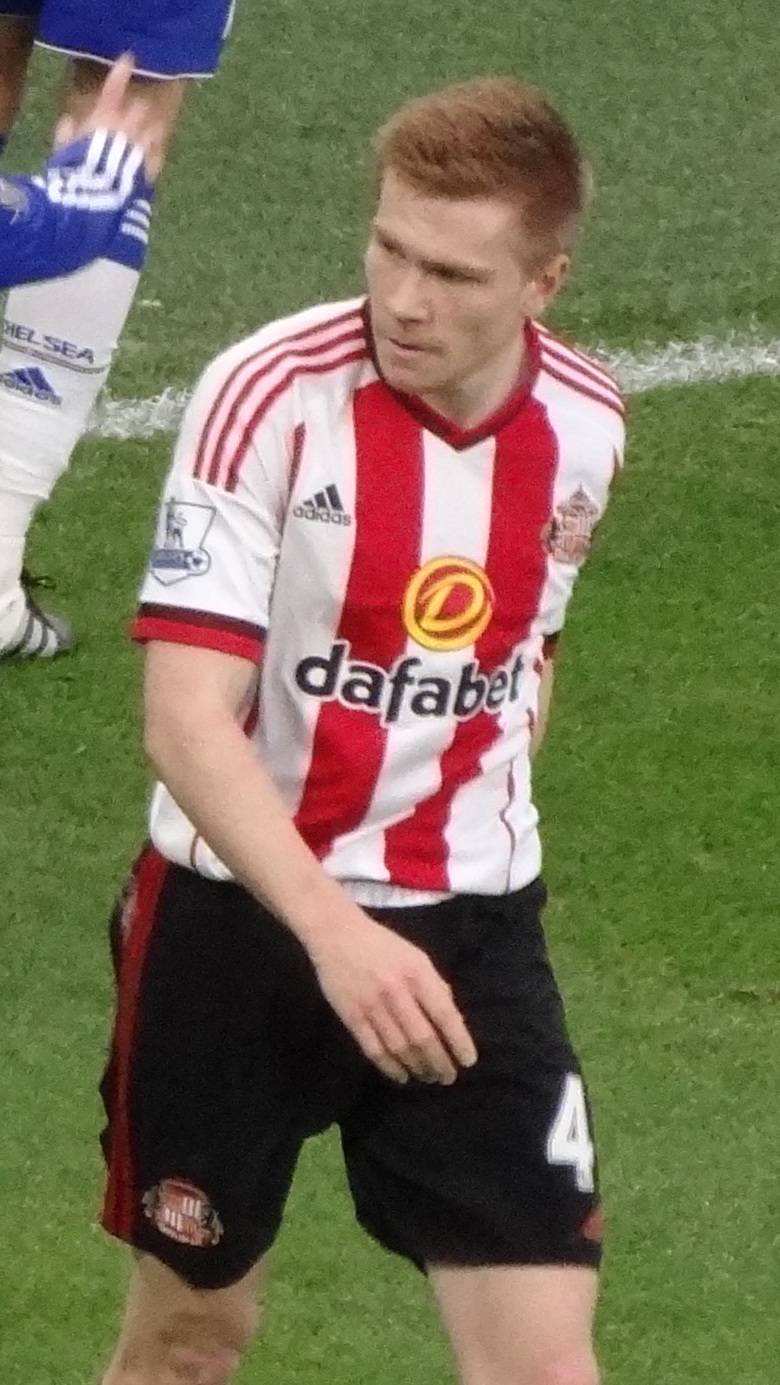
Watmore playing for Sunderland in 2015

Watmore signed for Premier League club Sunderland on 24 May 2013 for an undisclosed fee on a two-year contract. He made his debut for the Sunderland first team on 5 January 2014 as a 60th-minute substitute for Ji Dong-won in a 3–1 home win against Carlisle United in the third round of the FA Cup.

On 31 January 2014, Watmore joined Scottish Premiership club Hibernian on loan for the rest of the 2013–14 season. His first goal came on 15 March 2014 in a 3–1 defeat away to Partick Thistle. Watmore left Hibernian at the end of the season.

On 29 May 2015, Watmore was named the U21 Premier League Player of the Season, after scoring 11 goals in 19 matches in the competition.

Watmore made his league debut for Sunderland on 15 August 2015, coming off the bench to score a late consolation goal with a scuffed volley into the bottom-left corner in a 3–1 home loss to Norwich City. He signed a new four-year contract with Sunderland on 22 November 2015. Watmore returned from two months out with an ankle injury on 16 April 2016 as a half time substitute away to Norwich City, and scored the third goal in Sunderland's 3–0 victory, a result which brought the team to within a point of Norwich in the relegation battle.

Watmore was ruled out for the remainder of the a 2016–17 season after suffering cruciate knee ligament injury during Sunderland's 2–1 home win over Leicester City on 3 December 2016.

It was announced on 17 June 2020 that Watmore would be leaving Sunderland, bringing to an end his 7 years at the club.

=== Middlesbrough ===
On 17 November 2020, Watmore signed for Middlesbrough on a short-term deal until January 2021. He scored his first goals for Middlesbrough when he scored twice in a 2–1 win against Swansea City on 2 December 2020. Watmore continued his goal scoring with two on 12 December in a 3–0 win against Millwall. On 7 January 2021, Watmore signed a new two-and-a-half-year deal at Middlesbrough. Watmore's performances earned him the championship player of the month for December. Watmore was Middlesbrough's top scorer for the 2020–21 season, with nine goals.

=== Millwall ===
On 31 January 2023, Watmore signed for Millwall for an undisclosed fee. On 19 May 2025, the club announced the player would be leaving in June when his contract expired.

=== Rotherham United ===
On 2 February 2026, Watmore signed for Rotherham United. On 8 May 2026 Rotherham announced he was being released after the team's relegation to EFL League Two.

On 8 July 2026 Watmore announced his retirement from professional football at age 32

== International career ==
Watmore made his debut for England under-20s on 28 May 2015 in the 2015 Toulon Tournament, scoring England's second goal in a 3–3 draw with Morocco. He was named in the Team of the Tournament and was also voted as the Revelation of the Tournament. He made five appearances and scored two goals for the under-20s in 2015.

In August 2015, Watmore was called up to the England under-21 squad for the first time. He made his debut against the United States on 3 September 2015 as a second-half substitute, and assisted James Wilson's winning goal. Watmore scored his first under-21 goal and assisted two others on 14 November 2015 after coming on as a substitute against Switzerland in a 2017 UEFA European Under-21 Championship qualifier. He was part of the team that won the 2016 Toulon Tournament, their first such win for 22 years. He scored three goals in 13 appearances for the under-21s from 2015 to 2016.

== Style of play ==
Watmore plays as a winger. In November 2015, Sunderland forward Jermain Defoe likened Watmore to Gareth Bale, his former Tottenham Hotspur teammate, citing a shared ability of ball control.

== Personal life ==
Watmore continued studying for a degree in economics and business management after signing for Sunderland, transferring from the University of Manchester to Newcastle University. He graduated with a first-class honours degree in December 2015. In 2017, whilst on holiday in Barbados, Watmore reportedly helped save three pensioners from the water after a boat crash.

== Career statistics ==
As of the end of 2024–25 season

Appearances and goals by club, season and competition
Club	Season	League			National Cup (Note: Includes FA Cup, Scottish Cup)		League Cup (Note: Includes League/EFL Cup)		Other		Total	
Club	Season	Division	Apps	Goals	Apps	Goals	Apps	Goals	Apps	Goals	Apps	Goals
Altrincham	2011–12	Conference North	11	1	0	0	—		1 (Note: Appearance in FA Trophy)	0	12	1
Altrincham	2012–13	Conference North	37	14	4	0	—		5 (Note: One appearance in Cheshire Senior Cup, two in FA Trophy, two in Conference North play-offs)	0	46	14
Altrincham	Total		48	15	4	0	—		6	0	58	15
Clitheroe (loan)	2011–12	NPL Division One West	4	0	—		—		—		4	0
Sunderland	2013–14	Premier League	0	0	1	0	0	0	—		1	0
Hibernian (loan)	2013–14	Scottish Premiership	9	1	1	0	—		0	0	10	1
Sunderland	2014–15	Premier League	0	0	0	0	0	0	—		0	0
Sunderland	2015–16	Premier League	23	3	1	0	1	1	—		25	4
Sunderland	2016–17	Premier League	14	0	0	0	3	0	—		17	0
Sunderland	2017–18	EFL Championship	6	0	0	0	0	0	—		6	0
Sunderland	2018–19	League One	11	1	1	0	0	0	4 (Note: Appearances in EFL Trophy)	1	16	2
Sunderland	2019–20	League One	17	1	2	0	0	0	3 (Note: Appearances in EFL Trophy)	1	22	2
Sunderland	Total		71	5	5	0	4	1	7	2	87	8
Middlesbrough	2020–21	EFL Championship	30	9	0	0	—		0	0	30	9
Middlesbrough	2021–22	EFL Championship	41	7	3	0	—		0	0	44	7
Middlesbrough	2022–23	EFL Championship	21	5	1	0	1	0	—		23	5
Middlesbrough	Total		92	21	4	0	1	0	0	0	97	21
Millwall	2022–23	EFL Championship	16	3	0	0	0	0	0	0	16	3
Millwall	2023–24	EFL Championship	34	3	1	1	0	0	0	0	35	4
Millwall	2024–25	EFL Championship	26	5	1	0	2	0	0	0	29	5
Millwall	Total		76	11	2	1	2	0	0	0	80	12
Career total			300	53	16	1	7	1	13	2	336	57

== Honours ==
England U21

- Toulon Tournament: 2016

Individual

- Altrincham Player of the Year: 2012–13
- Altrincham Goal of the Year: 2012–13
- Sunderland Supporters' Young Player of the Year: 2015–16
- U21 Premier League Player of the Season: 2014–15
- Toulon Tournament Team of the Tournament: 2015
- Toulon Tournament Revelation of the Tournament: 2015
- EFL Championship Player of the Month:December 2020.
