= Connor Malley =

English footballer (born 2000)

Personal information
- Full name: Connor Malley
- Date of birth: 20 March 2000 (age 26)
- Place of birth: Hebburn, England
- Height: 6 ft 1 in (1.86 m)
- Position: Central midfielder

Team information
- Current team: Shamrock Rovers
- Number: 23

Youth career
- –2015: Sunderland
- 2015–2018: Middlesbrough

Senior career*
Years	Team	Apps	(Gls)
2019–2022	Middlesbrough	3	(0)
2020	→ Ayr United (loan)	5	(1)
2020–2021	→ Carlisle United (loan)	3	(0)
2022	→ Gateshead (loan)	11	(3)
2022–2023	Rochdale	9	(0)
2023	Dundalk	33	(3)
2024–2025	Sligo Rovers	47	(4)
2025	→ Shamrock Rovers (loan)	6	(0)
2026–	Shamrock Rovers	11	(0)
- * Club domestic league appearances and goals as of 17:28, 9 November 2026 (UTC)

Connor Malley (born 20 March 2000) is an English professional footballer who plays for League of Ireland Premier Division side Shamrock Rovers.

== Career ==
=== Middlesbrough ===
Born in Hebburn, Malley started his career in the youth academy of Sunderland before joining Middlesbrough. He signed his first professional contract with the club in May 2019, signing a three-year contract lasting until the summer of 2022.

==== Ayr loan ====
He joined Scottish Championship side Ayr United on loan to the end of the season on 31 January 2020. He made his debut for the club on 25 February 2020, where he scored in a 2–1 win over Greenock Morton. He went on to make five appearances for Ayr, scoring once.

==== Carlisle United loan ====
On 2 October 2020, Malley joined League Two side Carlisle United on loan until January 2021. He returned to Middlesbrough at the end of his loan in January 2021, having made five appearances in all competitions.

He made his debut for Middlesbrough on 21 April 2021 as a first-half substitute for the injured Grant Hall in a 2–1 away victory over Rotherham United, with Malley's performance described as "outstanding". He made two further appearances for Middlesbrough that season as they finished 10th in the Championship.

==== Gateshead loan ====
On 5 March 2022, Malley joined National League North side Gateshead on loan for the remainder of the 2021–22 season. He scored three goals in eleven appearances as the club won the league to gain promotion to the National League.

=== Rochdale ===
On 15 August 2022, Malley signed for League Two club Rochdale on a free transfer after being released by Middlesbrough earlier in the summer. Malley departed the club upon the expiration of his short-term contract in January 2023.

=== Dundalk ===
On 12 January 2023, Malley signed for League of Ireland Premier Division club Dundalk on a multi-year contract. He made his debut on 28 February 2023 in a 1–1 draw at home to UCD at Oriel Park. At the end of the season the club opted against activating the second year of his contract and he was allowed to leave the club on a free transfer.

=== Sligo Rovers ===
On 23 December 2023, it was announced that Malley had signed a one year contract with fellow League of Ireland Premier Division club Sligo Rovers for the 2024 season. He scored his first goals for the club on 3 June 2024, when he scored both goals in a 2–1 win at home to Drogheda United. On 1 October 2024, he signed a contract extension with the club until the end of the 2025 season. A month later he was subject to transfer interest from Shamrock Rovers and Shelbourne, with Sligo not interested in letting him leave the club unless a substantial transfer fee was received. In May 2025, Malley drew criticism from manager John Russell who left him out of the team and squad in recent weeks due to how he had trained and conducted himself around the group.

=== Shamrock Rovers ===
On 24 July 2025, Malley was loaned out to Shamrock Rovers until the end of the season to the expiry of his Sligo contract. He made six league appearances as his side won the 2025 League of Ireland Premier Division title. On 9 November 2025, came off the bench in the 2025 FAI Cup final as his side defeated Cork City 2–0 at the Aviva Stadium. On 27 November 2025, he scored his first goal for the club, in a 2–1 defeat to Shakhtar Donetsk at Tallaght Stadium in the UEFA Conference League. On 5 December 2025, it was confirmed that Malley had signed for Shamrock Rovers on a permanent basis, on a multi-year contract.

== Career statistics ==
As of match played 16 August 2026

Appearances and goals by club, season and competition
Club	Season	League			National Cup (Note: Includes the FA Cup, Scottish Cup & FAI Cup)		League Cup (Note: Includes the EFL Cup)		Europe		Other		Total	
Club	Season	Division	Apps	Goals	Apps	Goals	Apps	Goals	Apps	Goals	Apps	Goals	Apps	Goals
Middlesbrough U21	2017–18	—			—		—		—		3 (Note: Appearances in the EFL Trophy)	0	3	0
Middlesbrough U21	2018–19	—			—		—		—		3	0	3	0
Middlesbrough U21	Total		—								6	0	6	0
Middlesbrough	2019–20	Championship	0	0	0	0	0	0	—		—		0	0
Middlesbrough	2020–21	Championship	3	0	0	0	0	0	—		—		3	0
Middlesbrough	2021–22	Championship	0	0	0	0	1	0	—		—		1	0
Middlesbrough	Total		3	0	0	0	1	0	—		—		4	0
Ayr United (loan)	2019–20	Scottish Championship	5	1	0	0	—		—		—		5	1
Carlisle United (loan)	2020–21	League Two	3	0	0	0	—		—		2	0	5	0
Gateshead (loan)	2021–22	National League North	11	3	—		—		—		—		11	3
Rochdale	2022–23	League Two	9	0	1	0	1	0	—		3	0	14	0
Dundalk	2023	LOI Premier Division	33	3	3	0	–		4 (Note: Appearances in the UEFA Europa Conference League)	0	0 (Note: Appearance(s) in the Leinster Senior Cup)	0	40	3
Sligo Rovers	2024	LOI Premier Division	35	4	1	0	—		–		–		36	4
Sligo Rovers	2025	LOI Premier Division	12	0	0	0	—		–		–		12	0
Sligo Rovers	Total		47	4	1	0	—		–		–		48	4
Shamrock Rovers (loan)	2025	LOI Premier Division	6	0	2	0	–		6 (Note: Appearances in the UEFA Conference League)	1	—		14	1
Shamrock Rovers	2026	LOI Premier Division	11	0	1	0	–		1 (Note: Appearance(s) in the UEFA Champions League)	0	2 (Note: 1 appearance in the President of Ireland's Cup; 1 appearance in the Leinster Senior Cup)	0	15	0
Career total			128	11	8	0	2	0	11	1	13	0	162	12

== Honours ==
Gateshead

- National League North: 2021–22

Shamrock Rovers

- League of Ireland Premier Division: 2025, 2026
- FAI Cup: 2025
