= 2016–17 Sunderland A.F.C. season =

English football club season

Sunderland
2016–17 season
- Chairman: Ellis Short
- Manager: David Moyes
- Stadium: Stadium of Light
- Premier League: 20th (relegated)
- FA Cup: Third round (eliminated by Burnley)
- EFL Cup: Fourth round (eliminated by Southampton)
- Top goalscorer: League: Jermain Defoe (15); All: Jermain Defoe (15)
- Highest home attendance: 46,494 vs. Liverpool (2 January 2017)
- Lowest home attendance: 13,979 vs. Shrewsbury Town (24 August 2016)
- Average home league attendance: 41,287
Home colours	Away colours	Third colours

The 2016–17 season was Sunderland's 138th season in existence, and their tenth consecutive season in the Premier League. Along with competing in the Premier League, the club also participated in the FA Cup and EFL Cup. The season covered the period from 1 July 2016 to 30 June 2017.

The club was relegated to the second tier for the first time in ten years at the end of the season, finishing bottom of the table with 24 points.

== First team squad ==
Squad No.	Name	Nationality	Position(s)	Age	Apps	Goals	Signed from
Goalkeepers
1	Vito Mannone	(Italy)	GK	29	80	0	(England) Arsenal
12	Mika	(Portugal)	GK	26	0	0	(Portugal) Boavista
13	Jordan Pickford	(England)	GK	23	23	0	Academy
32	Max Stryjek U23	(Poland)	GK	20	0	0	(Poland) Polonia Warsaw
Defenders
2	Billy Jones	(England)	RB	30	61	1	(England) West Bromwich Albion
3	Bryan Oviedo	(Costa Rica)	LB	27	3	0	(England) Everton
4	Jason Denayer	(Belgium)	CB	22	19	0	(England) Manchester City (on loan)
5	Papy Djilobodji	(Senegal)	CB	28	23	0	(England) Chelsea
15	Joleon Lescott	(England)	CB	34	1	0	(Greece) AEK Athens
16	John O'Shea (captain)	(Republic of Ireland)	CB	36	206	3	(England) Manchester United
19	Paddy McNair	(Northern Ireland)	CB	22	12	2	(England) Manchester United
21	Javier Manquillo	(Spain)	RB	23	14	0	(Spain) Atlético Madrid (on loan)
22	Donald Love	(Scotland)	RB	22	15	0	(England) Manchester United
23	Lamine Koné	(Ivory Coast)	CB	28	37	3	(France) Lorient
34	Thomas Robson U23	(England)	LB	21	1	0	(England) Darlington
43	Michael Ledger U23	(England)	CB	19	0	0	Academy
45	Josh Robson U23	(England)	RB	19	0	0	Academy
Midfielders
6	Lee Cattermole (vice-captain)	(England)	DM	29	184	2	(England) Wigan Athletic
7	Sebastian Larsson	(Sweden)	CM	32	195	14	(England) Birmingham City
8	Jack Rodwell	(England)	CM	26	66	6	(England) Manchester City
10	Wahbi Khazri	(Tunisia)	AM	26	29	2	(France) Bordeaux
14	Duncan Watmore	(England)	RW	23	43	4	(England) Altrincham
17	Didier Ndong	(Gabon)	CM	23	22	1	(France) Lorient
20	Steven Pienaar	(South Africa)	LW	35	16	0	(England) Everton
24	Darron Gibson	(Republic of Ireland)	CM	29	3	0	(England) Everton
25	Ethan Robson U23	(England)	CM	20	0	0	Academy
27	Jan Kirchhoff	(Germany)	DM	26	23	0	(Germany) Bayern Munich
37	Rees Greenwood U23	(England)	LW	21	1	0	Academy
39	George Honeyman U23	(England)	AM	22	6	0	Academy
44	Adnan Januzaj	(Belgium)	RW	22	21	1	(England) Manchester United (on loan)
46	Lynden Gooch	(United States)	AM	21	13	0	Academy
Forwards
9	Fabio Borini	(Italy)	ST	26	81	16	(England) Liverpool
18	Jermain Defoe	(England)	ST	34	82	36	(Canada) Toronto FC
28	Victor Anichebe	(Nigeria)	ST	29	12	3	(England) West Bromwich Albion
29	Joel Asoro	(Sweden)	ST	18	4	0	(Sweden) IF Brommapojkarna
35	Josh Maja U18	(England)	ST	18	1	0	(England) Manchester City

== Transfers and loans ==
=== New contracts ===
No.	Pos	Player	Until	Source
3	LB	(Netherlands) Patrick van Aanholt	June 2020	
18	ST	(England) Jermain Defoe	June 2019	
1	GK	(Italy) Vito Mannone	June 2018	
23	CB	(Ivory Coast) Lamine Koné	June 2021	

=== Transfers in ===
First Team
Date	Position	No.	Player	From club	Transfer fee
5 August 2016	CB	5	(Senegal) Papy Djilobodji	(England) Chelsea	£8,000,000
11 August 2016	CB	19	(Northern Ireland) Paddy McNair	(England) Manchester United	£5,500,000
11 August 2016	RB	22	(Scotland) Donald Love	(England) Manchester United	£5,500,000
19 August 2016	LW	20	(South Africa) Steven Pienaar	(England) Everton	Free
31 August 2016	CM	17	(Gabon) Didier N'Dong	(France) Lorient	£13,600,000
2 September 2016	ST	28	(Nigeria) Victor Anichebe	(England) West Bromwich Albion	Free
7 September 2016	GK	12	(Portugal) Mika	(Portugal) Boavista	Undisc.
24 January 2017	DF	15	(England) Joleon Lescott	(Greece) AEK Athens	Free
30 January 2017	CM	24	(Republic of Ireland) Darron Gibson	(England) Everton	£7,500,000
30 January 2017	LB	3	(Costa Rica) Bryan Oviedo	(England) Everton	£7,500,000

Reserves and Academy
Date	Position	Player	From club	Transfer fee
4 July 2016	MF	(Republic of Ireland) Jack Connolly	(Republic of Ireland) St Francis	Undisc.
4 July 2016	MF	(Sweden) Benjamin Mbunga-Kimpioka	(Sweden) IK Sirius	Undisc.
4 July 2016	FW	(Scotland) Lee Connelly	(Scotland) Queen's Park	Undisc.

=== Loans in ===
First Team
Start date	End date	Position	No.	Player	Club from
12 August 2016	30 June 2017	RW	44	(Belgium) Adnan Januzaj	(England) Manchester United
25 August 2016	30 June 2017	RB	21	(Spain) Javier Manquillo	(Spain) Atlético Madrid
31 August 2016	30 June 2017	CB	4	(Belgium) Jason Denayer	(England) Manchester City

Reserves and Academy
Start date	End date	Position	No.	Player	To club

=== Transfers out ===
First Team
Exit date	Position	No.	Player	To club	Transfer fee
1 July 2016	GK	33	(England) Steve Harper	Retired	Free
1 July 2016	CB	5	(England) Wes Brown	(England) Blackburn Rovers	Free
1 July 2016	ST	19	(England) Danny Graham	(England) Blackburn Rovers	Free
1 July 2016	ST	26	(Scotland) Steven Fletcher	(England) Sheffield Wednesday	Free
1 July 2016	CB	27	(Argentina) Santiago Vergini	(Argentina) Boca Juniors	£1,500,000
16 July 2016	LW	23	(Italy) Emanuele Giaccherini	(Italy) Napoli	£2,000,000
27 July 2016	CB	29	(France) Valentin Roberge	(Cyprus) Apollon Limassol	Free
16 August 2016	DM	4	(Scotland) Liam Bridcutt	(England) Leeds United	£2,000,000
17 August 2016	CM	14	(Spain) Jordi Gómez	(England) Wigan Athletic	£500,000
19 August 2016	CB	4	(France) Younès Kaboul	(England) Watford	£4,000,000
6 September 2016	RW	28	(Greece) Charis Mavrias	(Germany) Karlsruher SC	Free
30 January 2017	LB	3	(Netherlands) Patrick van Aanholt	(England) Crystal Palace	£14,000,000
2 February 2017	CB		(Uruguay) Sebastián Coates	(Portugal) Sporting CP	£5,000,000

Reserves and Academy
Exit date	Position	No.	Player	To club	Transfer fee
1 July 2016	ST	38	(Scotland) Mikael Mandron	(England) Eastleigh	Free
1 July 2016	CM	40	(England) Martin Smith	(Scotland) Kilmarnock	Free
1 July 2016	CM	42	(England) Liam Agnew	(England) Boston United	Free
1 July 2016	GK		(England) Greg Purvis		Free
1 July 2016	DM		(England) David Lowrie		Free
1 July 2016	CM		(Republic of Ireland) Avis Ganiyu		Free
1 July 2016	AM		(England) Dylan McEvoy		Free

=== Loans out ===
First Team
Start date	End date	Position	No.	Player	To club
1 July 2016	2 February 2017	CB	22	(Uruguay) Sebastián Coates	(Portugal) Sporting CP
28 July 2016	30 June 2017	RB	12	(Wales) Adam Matthews	(England) Bristol City
5 August 2016	30 June 2017	LW	30	(England) Will Buckley	(England) Sheffield Wednesday
30 August 2016	30 June 2017	LW	17	(Netherlands) Jeremain Lens	(Turkey) Fenerbahçe

Reserves and Academy
Start date	End date	Position	No.	Player	To club
31 January 2017	30 June 2017	DF	—	(Australia) Tom Beadling	(England) Bury
31 January 2017	30 June 2017	FW	—	(England) Andrew Nelson	(England) Hartlepool United

== Pre-season friendlies ==
On 3 June 2016, Sunderland announced two pre-season friendlies against Hartlepool United and Rotherham United.

20 July 2016 Friendly	Hartlepool United	0–3	Sunderland	Hartlepool, England
19:30 BST		Report	Defoe 7', 20'; Khazri 15'	Stadium: Victoria Park

23 July 2016 Friendly	Rotherham United	1–2	Sunderland	Rotherham, England
15:00 BST	Ward 46'	Report	Borini 27'; N'Zogbia 84'	Stadium: New York Stadium

25 July 2016 Friendly	Stade Nyonnais (Switzerland)	0–2	Sunderland	Évian-les-Bains, France
18:30 BST		Report	Watmore 39' (pen.), 45+1' (pen.)	Stadium: Stade Camille-Fournier

27 July 2016 Friendly	Dijon (France)	2–3	Sunderland	Évian-les-Bains, France
17:00 BST	Bahamboula 53'; Bela 69'	Report	Asoro 15'; Khazri 59'; Borini 77' (pen.)	Stadium: Stade Camille-Fournier

30 July 2016 Friendly	Montpellier (France)	1–1	Sunderland	Aix-les-Bains, France
17:00 BST	Camara 68'	Report	Borini 43'	Stadium: Stade Jacques Forestier

5 August 2016 Friendly	Borussia Dortmund (Germany)	1–1	Sunderland	Altach, Austria
18:00 BST	Şahin 17'	Report	Koné 66'	Stadium: Cashpoint Arena

== Competitions ==
=== Premier League ===
==== League table ====
Pos	Team	Pld	W	D	L	GF	GA	GD	Pts	Qualification or relegation
16	Burnley	38	11	7	20	39	55	−16	40	
17	Watford	38	11	7	20	40	68	−28	40	
18	Hull City (R)	38	9	7	22	37	80	−43	34	Relegation to EFL Championship
19	Middlesbrough (R)	38	5	13	20	27	53	−26	28	Relegation to EFL Championship
20	Sunderland (R)	38	6	6	26	29	69	−40	24	Relegation to EFL Championship

Source: Premier League
Rules for classification: 1) Points; 2) Goal difference; 3) Goals scored; 4) Play-offs (only if needed to decide champion, teams for relegation or teams for UEFA competitions).
(R) Relegated

==== Results summary ====
Overall								Home						Away					
Pld	W	D	L	GF	GA	GD	Pts	W	D	L	GF	GA	GD	W	D	L	GF	GA	GD
38	6	6	26	29	69	−40	24	3	5	11	16	34	−18	3	1	15	13	35	−22

Source: Premier League

==== Results by matchday ====
Matchday	1	2	3	4	5	6	7	8	9	10	11	12	13	14	15	16	17	18	19	20	21	22	23	24	25	26	27	28	29	30	31	32	33	34	35	36	37	38
Ground	A	H	A	H	A	H	H	A	A	H	A	H	A	H	A	H	H	A	A	H	H	A	H	A	H	A	H	H	A	A	H	H	A	H	A	H	A	A
Result	L	L	D	L	L	L	D	L	L	L	W	W	L	W	L	L	W	L	L	D	L	L	D	W	L	L	L	D	L	L	L	D	L	L	W	L	L	L
Position	16	18	16	19	19	20	20	20	20	20	20	19	20	18	20	20	18	18	18	18	19	20	19	20	20	20	20	20	20	20	20	20	20	20	20	20	20	20

Source: Statto
A = Away; H = Home; W = Win; D = Draw; L = Loss

==== Matches ====
13 August 2016 1	Manchester City	2–1	Sunderland	Manchester
17:30 BST	Agüero 4' (pen.); McNair 87' (o.g.); Kolarov (yellow card) 90+1'	Report	Gooch (yellow card) 42'; Love (yellow card) 67'; Defoe 71'	Stadium: City of Manchester Stadium; Attendance: 54,362; Referee: Robert Madley

21 August 2016 2	Sunderland	1–2	Middlesbrough	Sunderland
13:30 BST	Van Aanholt 71'; Gooch (yellow card) 81'	Report	Stuani 13', 45'; Clayton (yellow card) 26'	Stadium: Stadium of Light; Attendance: 43,515; Referee: Martin Atkinson

27 August 2016 3	Southampton	1–1	Sunderland	Southampton
15:00 BST	Redmond (yellow card) 28'; Davis (yellow card) 47'; Rodriguez 85'	Report	Pienaar (yellow card) 65'; Defoe 80' (pen.); Rodwell (yellow card) 90+1'	Stadium: St Mary's Stadium; Attendance: 30,152; Referee: Lee Mason

12 September 2016 4	Sunderland	0–3	Everton	Sunderland
20:00 BST	Watmore (yellow card) 43'	Report	Gueye (yellow card) 55'; Lukaku 60', 68', 71'	Stadium: Stadium of Light; Attendance: 42,406; Referee: Mike Jones

18 September 2016 5	Tottenham Hotspur	1–0	Sunderland	Tottenham, London
16:30 BST	Kane 59'; Davies (yellow card) 84'	Report	Manquillo (yellow card) 44'; Denayer (yellow card) 57'; Cattermole (yellow card) 62'; Ndong (yellow card) 65'; Januzaj (yellow card) 81' (yellow-red card) 90'; Djilobodji (yellow card) 90+1'	Stadium: White Hart Lane; Attendance: 31,251; Referee: Mike Dean

24 September 2016 6	Sunderland	2–3	Crystal Palace	Sunderland
15:00 BST	Defoe 39', 60'	Report	Cabaye (yellow card) 45+4'; Ledley 61'; Puncheon (yellow card) 72'; McArthur 76'; Benteke 90+3'	Stadium: Stadium of Light; Attendance: 38,941; Referee: Anthony Taylor

1 October 2016 7	Sunderland	1–1	West Bromwich Albion	Sunderland
15:00 BST	Kirchhoff (yellow card) 36'; Van Aanholt 83'	Report	Yacob (yellow card) 27'; Chadli 35'; McClean (yellow card) 69'; Evans (yellow card) 90+6'	Stadium: Stadium of Light; Attendance: 40,043; Referee: Stuart Attwell

15 October 2016 8	Stoke City	2–0	Sunderland	Stoke-on-Trent
15:00 BST	Allen 8', 45+1'; Arnautović (yellow card) 55'	Report	Jones (yellow card) 90+3'	Stadium: Bet365 Stadium; Attendance: 27,701; Referee: Mike Jones

22 October 2016 9	West Ham United	1–0	Sunderland	Stratford, London
15:00 BST	Fernandes (yellow card) 31'; Reid (yellow card) 68', (goal) 90+4'	Report	Rodwell (yellow card) 25'; Ndong (yellow card) 27'; Pienaar (yellow card) 40'; Khazri (yellow card) 83'; Jones (yellow card) 90'	Stadium: Olympic Stadium; Attendance: 56,985; Referee: Robert Madley

29 October 2016 10	Sunderland	1–4	Arsenal	Sunderland
12:30 BST	Khazri (yellow card) 30'; Ndong (yellow card) 33'; Pienaar (yellow card) 41'; Djilobodji (yellow card) 48'; Defoe 65' (pen.)	Report	Sánchez 19', 78', (yellow card) 66'; Čech (yellow card) 64'; Giroud 71', 76'; Gibbs (yellow card) 80'	Stadium: Stadium of Light; Attendance: 44,322; Referee: Martin Atkinson

5 November 2016 11	Bournemouth	1–2	Sunderland	Bournemouth
15:00 GMT	Arter (yellow card) 3'; Gosling 11'; King (yellow card) 30'; Smith (yellow card) 73'	Report	Anichebe 33', (yellow card) 70'; Pienaar (yellow card) 43' (yellow-red card) 70'; Defoe 74' (pen.); Gooch (yellow card) 90'	Stadium: Vitality Stadium; Attendance: 11,084; Referee: Mike Dean

19 November 2016 12	Sunderland	3–0	Hull City	Sunderland
15:00 GMT	Djilobodji (yellow card) 30' (yellow-red card) 89'; Defoe 34'; Anichebe 62', 84'; Jones (yellow card) 72'	Report		Stadium: Stadium of Light; Attendance: 41,271; Referee: Lee Mason

26 November 2016 13	Liverpool	2–0	Sunderland	Liverpool
15:00 GMT	Lovren (yellow card) 67'; Origi 75'; Milner 90+1' (pen.)	Report	Koné (yellow card) 60'; O'Shea (yellow card) 64'; Pienaar (yellow card) 70'	Stadium: Anfield; Attendance: 53,114; Referee: Anthony Taylor

3 December 2016 14	Sunderland	2–1	Leicester City	Sunderland
15:00 GMT	Huth 64' (o.g.); Van Aanholt (yellow card) 68'; Larsson (yellow card) 72'; Defoe 77'; Djilobodji (yellow card) 78'	Report	Okazaki 80'; Fuchs (yellow card) 81'	Stadium: Stadium of Light; Attendance: 39,725; Referee: Andre Marriner

10 December 2016 15	Swansea City	3–0	Sunderland	Swansea
15:00 GMT	Sigurðsson 51' (pen.); Llorente 54', 80'; Rangel (yellow card) 60'	Report	Ndong (yellow card) 18'; Denayer (yellow card) 43'	Stadium: Liberty Stadium; Attendance: 20,453; Referee: Craig Pawson

14 December 2016 16	Sunderland	0–1	Chelsea	Sunderland
19:45 GMT	Defoe (yellow card) 43'; O'Shea (yellow card) 45+1'; Borini (yellow card) 72'	Report	Fàbregas 40'; Pedro (yellow card) 56'; Moses (yellow card) 90+1'	Stadium: Stadium of Light; Attendance: 41,008; Referee: Neil Swarbrick

17 December 2016 17	Sunderland	1–0	Watford	Sunderland
15:00 GMT	Januzaj (yellow card) 36'; Van Aanholt 49'	Report	Behrami (yellow card) 45+1'; Kaboul (yellow card) 75'	Stadium: Stadium of Light; Attendance: 40,267; Referee: Robert Madley

26 December 2016 18	Manchester United	3–1	Sunderland	Manchester
15:00 GMT	Blind (yellow card) 19', (goal) 39'; Ibrahimović 82'; Mkhitaryan 88'	Report	Borini (yellow card) 61', (goal) 90+1'; Koné (yellow card) 90+3'	Stadium: Old Trafford; Attendance: 75,325; Referee: Martin Atkinson

31 December 2016 19	Burnley	4–1	Sunderland	Burnley
15:00 GMT	Gray 31', 51', 53'; Marney (yellow card) 45+2'; Barnes 67' (pen.)	Report	Jones (yellow card) 42'; Defoe 71'	Stadium: Turf Moor; Attendance: 21,124; Referee: Graham Scott

2 January 2017 20	Sunderland	2–2	Liverpool	Sunderland
15:00 GMT	Rodwell (yellow card) 13'; Defoe 25' (pen.), 84' (pen.); Larsson (yellow card) 51'	Report	Sturridge 19'; Milner (yellow card) 30'; Mané 72', (yellow card) 83'; Lallana (yellow card) 83'	Stadium: Stadium of Light; Attendance: 46,494; Referee: Anthony Taylor

14 January 2017 21	Sunderland	1–3	Stoke City	Sunderland
15:00 GMT	Defoe 40'; Djilobodji (yellow card) 62'; Van Aanholt (yellow card) 72'; Januzaj (yellow card) 90+5'	Report	Arnautović 15', 22'; Crouch 34'; Adam (yellow card) 56'	Stadium: Stadium of Light; Attendance: 42,722; Referee: Mike Dean

21 January 2017 22	West Bromwich Albion	2–0	Sunderland	West Bromwich
15:00 GMT	Fletcher 30'; Brunt 36'; Nyom (yellow card) 90+2'	Report	Honeyman (yellow card) 85'	Stadium: The Hawthorns; Attendance: 24,380; Referee: Craig Pawson

31 January 2017 23	Sunderland	0–0	Tottenham Hotspur	Sunderland
19:45 GMT	Rodwell (yellow card) 33'; Manquillo (yellow card) 65'	Report		Stadium: Stadium of Light; Attendance: 40,058; Referee: Lee Mason

4 February 2017 24	Crystal Palace	0–4	Sunderland	London
15:00 GMT	Zaha (yellow card) 33'; Ward (yellow card) 66'; Puncheon (yellow card) 84'	Report	Larsson (yellow card) 6'; Koné 9', (yellow card) 71'; Januzaj (yellow card) 31'; Ndong 43'; Defoe 45+1', 45+3'	Stadium: Selhurst Park; Attendance: 25,310; Referee: Andre Marriner

11 February 2017 25	Sunderland	0–4	Southampton	Sunderland
15:00 GMT	Khazri (yellow card) 90+4'	Report	Gabbiadini 30', 45'; Denayer 89' (o.g.); Long 90+2'	Stadium: Stadium of Light; Attendance: 39,932; Referee: Paul Tierney

26 February 2017 26	Everton	2–0	Sunderland	Liverpool
15:00 GMT	Gueye 40'; Lukaku 80'	Report	Gibson (yellow card) 35'; Oviedo (yellow card) 77'	Stadium: Goodison Park; Attendance: 39,595; Referee: Stuart Attwell

5 March 2017 27	Sunderland	0–2	Manchester City	Sunderland
16:00 GMT	O'Shea (yellow card) 32'	Report	Agüero 42'; Sané 59'	Stadium: Stadium of Light; Attendance: 41,107; Referee: Martin Atkinson

18 March 2017 28	Sunderland	0–0	Burnley	Sunderland
15:00 GMT	Gibson (yellow card) 58'; Borini (yellow card) 81'; Jones (yellow card) 86'	Report	Barton (yellow card) 23'	Stadium: Stadium of Light; Attendance: 41,518; Referee: Bobby Madley

1 April 2017 29	Watford	1–0	Sunderland	Watford
15:00 BST	Britos 59'; Capoue (yellow card) 90+3'	Report	Jones (yellow card) 72'; Khazri (yellow card) 77'; Koné (yellow card) 78'	Stadium: Vicarage Road; Attendance: 20,805; Referee: Lee Probert

4 April 2017 30	Leicester City	2–0	Sunderland	Leicester
19:45 BST	Slimani 69'; Vardy 78'	Report	Cattermole (yellow card) 35'	Stadium: King Power Stadium; Attendance: 31,757; Referee: Graham Scott

9 April 2017 31	Sunderland	0–3	Manchester United	Sunderland
13:30 BST	Larsson (red card) 43'; Ndong (yellow card) 85'	Report	Shaw (yellow card) 15'; Ibrahimović 30'; Mkhitaryan 46'; Lingard (yellow card) 64'; Fellaini (yellow card) 79'; Martial (yellow card) 82'; Rashford 89'; Darmian (yellow card) 90+2'	Stadium: Stadium of Light; Attendance: 43,779; Referee: Craig Pawson

15 April 2017 32	Sunderland	2–2	West Ham United	Sunderland
15:00 BST	Cattermole (yellow card) 1'; Khazri 26'; Borini 90'	Report	Ayew 5'; Collins 47'; Byram (yellow card) 70' (yellow-red card) 90+5'	Stadium: Stadium of Light; Attendance: 40,168; Referee: Andre Marriner

26 April 2017 33	Middlesbrough	1–0	Sunderland	Middlesbrough
19:45 BST	De Roon 9'; Friend (yellow card) 29'; Clayton (yellow card) 31'; Fábio (yellow card) 71'	Report	O'Shea (yellow card) 37'; Gibson (yellow card) 45+2'; Jones (yellow card) 75'	Stadium: Riverside Stadium; Attendance: 30,742; Referee: Mike Dean

29 April 2017 34	Sunderland	0–1	Bournemouth	Sunderland
15:00 BST	Pienaar (yellow card) 46'; Borini (yellow card) 76'; Khazri (yellow card) 78'	Report	L. Cook (yellow card) 33'; Arter (yellow card) 76'; King 88'	Stadium: Stadium of Light; Attendance: 38,394; Referee: Stuart Attwell

6 May 2017 35	Hull City	0–2	Sunderland	Kingston upon Hull
15:00 BST	Clucas (yellow card) 28'; Grosicki (yellow card) 33'; Elmohamady (yellow card) 84'	Report	Jones 69'; Anichebe (yellow card) 89'; Defoe 90+2'	Stadium: KCOM Stadium; Attendance: 22,480; Referee: Neil Swarbrick

13 May 2017 36	Sunderland	0–2	Swansea City	Sunderland
15:00 BST	Larsson (yellow card) 58'; Khazri (yellow card) 78'; Gibson (yellow card) 84'; Borini (yellow card) 86'	Report	Llorente 9'; Naughton 45+2'	Stadium: Stadium of Light; Attendance: 38,781; Referee: Andre Marriner

16 May 2017 37	Arsenal	2–0	Sunderland	Holloway, London
19:45 BST	Bellerín (yellow card) 22'; Monreal (yellow card) 54'; Özil (yellow card) 55'; Sánchez 72', 81'; Mustafi (yellow card) 90+2'	Report	O'Shea (yellow card) 56'; Cattermole (yellow card) 74'	Stadium: Emirates Stadium; Attendance: 59,500; Referee: Roger East

21 May 2017 38	Chelsea	5–1	Sunderland	Fulham, London
15:00 BST	Willian 8'; Costa (yellow card) 39'; Hazard 61'; Pedro 77'; Batshuayi 90', 90+2'	Report	Manquillo 3'; Jones (yellow card) 48'	Stadium: Stamford Bridge; Attendance: 41,618; Referee: Neil Swarbrick

=== FA Cup ===
7 January 2017 Third round	Sunderland	0–0	Burnley	Sunderland
15:00 GMT		Report	Darikwa (yellow card) 69'; Barton (yellow card) 89'	Stadium: Stadium of Light; Attendance: 17,632; Referee: Stuart Attwell

17 January 2017 Third round replay	Burnley	2–0	Sunderland	Burnley
19:45 GMT	Vokes 44'; Defour (yellow card) 78'; Gray 83'; Barton (yellow card) 90+2'	Report	Love (yellow card) 12'	Stadium: Turf Moor; Attendance: 12,257; Referee: Mike Jones

=== EFL Cup ===
24 August 2016 Second round	Sunderland	1–0	Shrewsbury Town	Sunderland
19:45 BST	Gooch (yellow card) 55'; Januzaj 83'	Report	Deegan (yellow card) 7'; Sarcevic (yellow card) 29'	Stadium: Stadium of Light; Attendance: 13,979; Referee: Jeremy Simpson

20 September 2016 Third round	Queens Park Rangers	1–2	Sunderland	Shepherd's Bush, London
19:45 BST	Sandro 60'	Report	McNair 70', 80'	Stadium: Loftus Road; Attendance: 14,301; Referee: Peter Bankes

26 October 2016 Fourth round	Southampton	1–0	Sunderland	Southampton
19:45	Olomola (yellow card) 61'; Boufal 66'	Report	Khazri (yellow card) 45+2'; Jones (yellow card) 64'; Ndong (yellow card) 90+4'	Stadium: St Mary's Stadium; Attendance: 21,460; Referee: Chris Kavanagh

== Statistics ==
=== Overview ===
Competition	Record							
Competition	Pld	W	D	L	GF	GA	GD	Win %
Premier League	38	6	6	26	29	69	−40	15.79
FA Cup	2	0	1	1	0	2	−2	0.00
EFL Cup	3	2	0	1	3	2	+1	66.67
Total	43	8	7	28	32	73	−41	18.60

Source: Competitions

=== Appearances and goals ===
No.	Pos	Nat	Player	Total		Premier League		FA Cup		EFL Cup	
No.	Pos	Nat	Player	Apps	Goals	Apps	Goals	Apps	Goals	Apps	Goals
1	GK	(Italy) ITA	Vito Mannone	11	0	9	0	2	0	0	0
2	DF	(England) ENG	Billy Jones	29	1	25+2	1	1	0	1	0
3	DF	(Costa Rica) CRC	Bryan Oviedo	10	0	10	0	0	0	0	0
4	DF	(Belgium) BEL	Jason Denayer	27	0	22+2	0	2	0	1	0
5	DF	(Senegal) SEN	Papy Djilobodji	23	0	17+1	0	2	0	3	0
6	MF	(England) ENG	Lee Cattermole	9	0	8	0	0	0	0+1	0
7	MF	(Sweden) SWE	Sebastian Larsson	23	0	17+4	0	2	0	0	0
8	MF	(England) ENG	Jack Rodwell	23	0	17+3	0	1	0	2	0
9	FW	(Italy) ITA	Fabio Borini	26	2	19+5	2	2	0	0	0
10	MF	(Tunisia) TUN	Wahbi Khazri	23	1	7+14	1	0	0	2	0
12	GK	(Portugal) POR	Mika	0	0	0	0	0	0	0	0
13	GK	(England) ENG	Jordan Pickford	32	0	29	0	0	0	3	0
14	MF	(England) ENG	Duncan Watmore	17	0	11+3	0	0	0	2+1	0
15	DF	(England) ENG	Joleon Lescott	2	0	1+1	0	0	0	0	0
16	DF	(Republic of Ireland) IRL	John O'Shea	30	0	26+2	0	0+1	0	1	0
17	MF	(Gabon) GAB	Didier Ndong	33	1	27+4	1	0	0	2	0
18	FW	(England) ENG	Jermain Defoe	40	15	37	15	1+1	0	0+1	0
19	DF	(Northern Ireland) NIR	Paddy McNair	12	2	5+4	0	0	0	3	2
20	MF	(South Africa) RSA	Steven Pienaar	17	0	10+5	0	0	0	1+1	0
21	DF	(Spain) ESP	Javier Manquillo	22	1	15+5	1	2	0	0	0
22	DF	(Scotland) SCO	Donald Love	16	0	6+6	0	2	0	1+1	0
23	DF	(Ivory Coast) CIV	Lamine Koné	31	1	29+1	1	0	0	1	0
24	MF	(Republic of Ireland) IRL	Darron Gibson	11	0	7+4	0	0	0	0	0
27	MF	(Germany) GER	Jan Kirchhoff	8	0	5+2	0	0	0	1	0
28	FW	(Nigeria) NGR	Victor Anichebe	19	3	14+4	3	0	0	1	0
29	FW	(Sweden) SWE	Joel Asoro	4	0	0+1	0	0+1	0	2	0
32	GK	(Poland) POL	Max Stryjek	0	0	0	0	0	0	0	0
35	FW	(England) ENG	Josh Maja	1	0	0	0	0	0	0+1	0
39	MF	(England) ENG	George Honeyman	6	0	2+3	0	1	0	0	0
44	MF	(Belgium) BEL	Adnan Januzaj	28	1	18+7	0	2	0	1	1
46	MF	(United States) USA	Lynden Gooch	13	0	4+6	0	0	0	2+1	0
Players out on loan:
17	MF	(Netherlands) NED	Jeremain Lens	2	0	0+2	0	0	0	0	0
Players no longer with club:
3	DF	(Netherlands) NED	Patrick van Aanholt	26	3	20+1	3	2	0	3	0
4	DF	(France) FRA	Younès Kaboul	1	0	1	0	0	0	0	0

=== Clean sheets ===
Includes all competitive matches. The list is sorted alphabetically by surname when total clean sheets are equal.

Correct as of match played on 26 February 2017

No.	Nat.	Player	Matches Played	Clean Sheet %	Premier League	FA Cup	EFL Cup	TOTAL
1	(Italy)	Vito Mannone	11	27%	2	1	0	3
12	(Portugal)	Mika	0	0%	0	0	0	0
13	(England)	Jordan Pickford	20	15%	2	0	1	3
32	(Poland)	Max Stryjek	0	0%	0	0	0	0
Totals			31	19%	4	1	1	6

=== Disciplinary record ===
As of 26 February 2017

No.	Pos.	Name	Premier League			FA Cup			EFL Cup			Total		
No.	Pos.	Name	Yellow card	(yellow card) (yellow-red card)	Red card	Yellow card	(yellow card) (yellow-red card)	Red card	Yellow card	(yellow card) (yellow-red card)	Red card	Yellow card	(yellow card) (yellow-red card)	Red card
2	DF	Billy Jones	4						1			5		
3	DF	Bryan Oviedo	1									1		
4	DF	Jason Denayer	2									1		
5	DF	Papy Djilobodji	4	1								2		
6	MF	Lee Cattermole	1									1		
7	MF	Sebastian Larsson	3									3		
8	MF	Jack Rodwell	4									4		
9	FW	Fabio Borini	2									2		
10	MF	Wahbi Khazri	3						1			4		
14	MF	Duncan Watmore	1									1		
16	DF	John O'Shea	2									2		
17	MF	Didier Ndong	4						1			5		
18	FW	Jermain Defoe	1									1		
20	MF	Steven Pienaar	4	1								4	1	
21	DF	Javi Manquillo	2									2		
22	DF	Donald Love	1			1						2		
23	DF	Lamine Koné	3									3		
24	MF	Darron Gibson	1									1		
27	MF	Jan Kirchhoff	1									1		
28	FW	Victor Anichebe	1									1		
39	MF	George Honeyman	1									1		
44	MF	Adnan Januzaj	3	1								3	1	
46	MF	Lynden Gooch	3						1			3		
Total			54	3	0	1	0	0	4	0	0	58	3	0
