= 2022–23 Hartlepool United F.C. season =

Association football club season

Hartlepool United
2022–23 season
- Owner: Raj Singh
- Chairman: Raj Singh
- Manager: Paul Hartley (Until 18 September); Keith Curle (between 21 September – 22 February); John Askey (from 23 February)
- Stadium: Victoria Park
- League Two: 23rd (relegated)
- FA Cup: Third round (eliminated by Stoke City)
- EFL Cup: First round (eliminated by Blackburn Rovers)
- EFL Trophy: Group stage
- Top goalscorer: League: Josh Umerah (12); All: Josh Umerah (15)
- Highest home attendance: 6,812 (vs. Crawley Town)
- Lowest home attendance: 1,247 (vs. Everton U21)
- Average home league attendance: 4,676
- Biggest win: 4–1 (vs. Grimsby Town)
- Biggest defeat: 6–0 (vs. Everton U21)
Home colours	Away colours	Third colours

The 2022–23 season was the 114th season of competitive association football and 91st season in the Football League played by Hartlepool United Football Club, a professional football club based in Hartlepool, County Durham, England. Their 17th-place finish in 2021–22 meant it was their second successive season in EFL League Two. In addition to the league, they also competed in the FA Cup, the EFL Cup and the EFL Trophy. The 2022–23 season ran from 1 July 2022 to 30 June 2023.

Paul Hartley was appointed as Hartlepool's manager ahead of the 2022–23 season and signed 17 new players. In September, he was sacked as manager after nine league matches. Hartley was replaced by Keith Curle the following day on an interim basis. Curle was given the role permanently in December before being sacked himself in February with the club in a precarious position. His replacement John Askey was not able to keep Hartlepool in the division. They were relegated back to the National League after finishing second bottom of the 24-team 2022–23 League Two. In the 2022–23 FA Cup, Hartlepool were eliminated in the third round, losing to Championship side Stoke City. They were beaten in the first round of the 2022–23 EFL Cup by Championship club Blackburn Rovers. Hartlepool were eliminated in the group stages of the 2022–23 EFL Trophy.

== Background and pre-season ==
The 2022–23 season was Hartlepool's 91st season playing in the Football League. It was the club's second consecutive season in EFL League Two, the fourth tier of the English football league system since Hartlepool won the 2021 National League play-off final. In the 2021–22 season, Hartlepool finished in 17th place, sixteen points clear of relegation. Simultaneously, Hartlepool managed to maintain two good cup runs. Hartlepool reached a joint record fourth round of the FA Cup after defeating Championship side Blackpool before losing 2–0 to Premier League side Crystal Palace. Hartlepool also reached the semi-finals of the EFL Trophy before losing a penalty-shootout to Rotherham United. However, following the Rotherham match, Hartlepool would go on a bad run of form. Hartlepool won one of eleven games, resulting in the sacking of Graeme Lee before the final match of the season. In June 2022, Cove Rangers manager Paul Hartley was appointed as his replacement with Gordon Young as his assistant.

The summer transfer window saw a significant turnover in the Hartlepool squad. New manager Paul Hartley signed 17 new players, many of whom had played in the lower Scottish divisions including: Euan Murray, Brody Paterson, Jake Hastie, Jack Hamilton, Mouhamed Niang, Reghan Tumilty and Kyle Letheren. On 2 July, Pools' pre-season fixture with St Mirren was cancelled with the club saying: "we felt that it was more beneficial to spend an uninterrupted week of training at Maiden Castle focusing on building the squad and integrating new players into the pre-season camp without the added fixture in Scotland".

In the FourFourTwo League Two preview, Hartlepool were predicted a 23rd-place finish, with writer Gabriel Sutton saying "Paul Hartley's Hartlepool have a Scottish-themed recruitment policy as they seek safety. The new man won two promotions in three years managing Cove Rangers, but whether his numerous imports from north of the border will thrive remains to be seen." Equally, The Guardian classified Hartlepool as relegation candidates. Writing in The Sportsman, Simon Lillicrap predicted a 17th-place finish for Hartlepool, adding that "losing two key men to teams in the same division is hardly ideal preparation for a new campaign, while a lack of squad depth meant they even had to cancel a pre-season friendly. But things have improved since then and Paul Hartley has brought in Jake Hastie and Jack Hamilton, which should be enough to keep them comfortably away from danger."

Pools announced their first pre-season friendly with Blackburn Rovers visiting Victoria Park on 20 July. A day later, the club announced their opening two matches for the pre-season schedule, against Billingham Synthonia and Marske United. A fixture with Lincoln City was revealed on 16 May. A sixth pre-season fixture, against Sunderland was confirmed on 8 June. Another addition to the pre-season schedule was confirmed a day later, against St Mirren.

Pre-season match details
Date	Opponents	Venue	Result	Score F–A	Scorers	Attendance	Ref.
29 June 2022	Hibernian	N (Note: The match was played at the Amendoeira Golf Resort, Alcantarilha in Portugal in three-thirty-minute sections)	L	2–0		200	
5 July 2022	St Mirren	A	N/A (Note: Match was called-off at Hartlepool's request for an uninterrupted week of training.)	-			
9 July 2022	Billingham Synthonia	A	W	6–0	Lacey 6', Hastie 20', Carver 32', 34', Crawford 40', Grey 66'		
12 July 2022	Marske United	A	W	3–0	Grey 59', Niang 69', Tumilty 74'	807	
16 July 2022	Lincoln City	H	D	1–1	Crawford 34'	1,358	
20 July 2022	Blackburn Rovers	H	L	0–1		1,512	
25 July 2022	Sunderland	H	D	1–1	Batth (O.G.) 3'	4,785	

== Review and events ==
=== Paul Hartley (July–September) ===
The 2022–23 campaign started with an away trip to Walsall. Hartley handed out eight debuts for the opening match, although he was only able to name six substitutes due to several injuries. Hartlepool would fall to a 4–0 defeat, their heaviest opening day defeat in 30 years.

On 18 September, after a 2–0 defeat to Sutton United, Hartley was relieved of his duties. Hartlepool had won none of their first nine League Two matches, leaving them 23rd in the table. The Northern Echo reported that the sacking was due to a combination of poor results and tensions between Hartley and other club staff.

=== Keith Curle (September–February) ===
On the same day as Hartley was sacked, Keith Curle was named as Hartlepool's interim manager. Hartlepool earned their first league win of the season at the 12th attempt, defeating Doncaster Rovers 2–1. This ended a winless streak of 21 league games dating back to March 2022 during the previous season. On 3 December, Curle signed a new contract until the end of the 2023–24 season. Later that day, Hartlepool would lose 5–0 at home to Stockport County, led by former Hartlepool boss Dave Challinor. On 22 February, Curle was sacked as Hartlepool manager following a late defeat to Newport County which had left Pools in 22nd-place by one point but having played four more matches than Crawley Town. Curle won eight out of 29 matches during his spell in charge.

=== John Askey (February–May) ===
On 23 February, former York City boss John Askey was named as Curle's replacement. Form under Askey improved, with Hartlepool remaining unbeaten in his opening eight fixtures. With Hartlepool remaining within touching distance of safety, Pools faced direct relegation rivals Crawley Town at home in the third last match of the season. A 2–0 home defeat left Hartlepool on the brink of relegation back to the National League. This relegation was confirmed in the following match, despite a 3–1 home victory against Barrow. Following this relegation, BBC Sport highlighted the high turnover of the first-team squad as a contributor to the relegation with 22 signings and 10 loan players added to the squad from June 2022 until February 2023. Hartlepool were relegated with the worst defence in the division, having conceded 78 goals during the League Two season.

== Match results ==
=== League Two ===
==== League table ====
Pos	Team	Pld	W	D	L	GF	GA	GD	Pts	Promotion, qualification or relegation
19	Harrogate Town	46	12	16	18	59	68	−9	52	
20	Colchester United	46	12	13	21	44	51	−7	49	
21	AFC Wimbledon	46	11	15	20	48	60	−12	48	
22	Crawley Town	46	11	13	22	48	71	−23	46	
23	Hartlepool United (R)	46	9	16	21	52	78	−26	43	Relegation to National League
24	Rochdale (R)	46	9	11	26	46	70	−24	38	Relegation to National League

Source: EFL Official Website
Rules for classification: 1) Points; 2) Goal difference; 3) Number of goals scored; 4) Head-to-head results; 5) Wins; 6) Away goals; 7) Penalty points (sec 9.5); 8) 12-point sending off offences
(R) Relegated

==== Results summary ====
Overall								Home						Away					
Pld	W	D	L	GF	GA	GD	Pts	W	D	L	GF	GA	GD	W	D	L	GF	GA	GD
46	9	16	21	52	78	−26	43	5	10	8	27	36	−9	4	6	13	25	42	−17

==== Results by matchday ====
Round	1	2	3	4	5	6	7	8	9	10	11	12	13	14	15	16	17	18	19	20	21	22	23	24	25	26	27	28	29	30	31	32	33	34	35	36	37	38	39	40	41	42	43	44	45	46
Ground	A	H	A	H	H	A	A	H	A	H	A	H	H	A	A	H	H	A	A	H	A	A	H	H	A	H	A	H	A	H	A	A	H	H	A	H	A	H	H	A	H	A	A	H	H	A
Result	L	D	L	D	L	L	D	D	L	D	D	W	L	L	L	L	W	L	L	L	W	W	L	D	L	W	L	L	W	D	L	D	L	D	D	D	D	D	W	W	D	L	L	L	W	D
Position	24	20	23	21	21	23	23	23	23	24	23	20	21	24	24	24	23	23	24	24	22	21	21	22	23	22	22	22	22	22	23	22	22	22	22	22	23	23	23	23	22	23	23	23	23	23

Source: InTheMadCrowd
A = Away; H = Home; W = Win; D = Draw; L = Loss

==== Matches ====
On 23 June, the league fixtures were announced. Hartlepool's away fixture against Mansfield Town was moved from 1 October 2022 to 30 September 2022. Following the death of Queen Elizabeth II, matches across the UK were postponed as a mark of respect. With Hartlepool due to play at home to Doncaster Rovers on 10 September 2022, the match was postponed and rearranged for 4 October 2022. Hartlepool's planned away fixture at Crawley Town for 10 December 2022 was rearranged for 9 December 2022 at 19:45 to avoid potential clashes with England matches during the 2022 FIFA World Cup. Hartlepool's planned away fixture for Bradford City on 18 March 2023 was moved forward from 15:00 to 13:00. Hartlepool's scheduled home fixture on 17 December 2022 at home to Newport County was postponed due to a frozen pitch. The match was subsequently rearranged for 21 February 2023. Due to the Coronation of Charles III and Camilla, all Football League final fixtures were moved. Therefore, League Two matches were moved to 8 May 2023 at 12:30 from 6 May 2023.

30 July 2022 1	Walsall	4–0	Hartlepool United	Bescot
15:00 BST	Comley 21'; Johnson 27', 58', 73'	Report		Stadium: Bescot Stadium; Attendance: 5,754 (572 away); Referee: Lee Swabey

6 August 2022 2	Hartlepool United	0–0	AFC Wimbledon	Hartlepool
15:00 BST		Report		Stadium: Victoria Park; Attendance: 4,543 (332 away); Referee: Bobby Madden

13 August 2022 3	Northampton Town	2–1	Hartlepool United	Northampton
15:00 BST	Magloire 31'; Appéré 57'	Report	Umerah 45'	Stadium: Sixfields Stadium; Attendance: 4,828 (205 away); Referee: Sunny Sukhvir Gill

16 August 2022 4	Hartlepool United	0–0	Tranmere Rovers	Hartlepool
19:45 BST		Report		Stadium: Victoria Park; Attendance: 4,072 (263 away); Referee: Thomas Kirk

20 August 2022 5	Hartlepool United	1–3	Bradford City	Hartlepool
13:00 BST	Ferguson 17'	Report	Banks 6'; Cook 65', 90'	Stadium: Victoria Park; Attendance: 5,103 (704 away); Referee: Scott Oldham

27 August 2022 6	Leyton Orient	4–2	Hartlepool United	Leyton
15:00 BST	Moncur 4' (pen.); Kelman 38'; Smyth 48'; Sotiriou 74'	Report	McDonald 32'; Umerah 69' (pen.)	Stadium: Breyer Group Stadium; Attendance: 6,634 (249 away); Referee: Declan Bourne

3 September 2022 7	Colchester United	1–1	Hartlepool United	Colchester
15:00 BST	Lubala 90+4'	Report	McDonald 29'	Stadium: Colchester Community Stadium; Attendance: 2,983 (178 away); Referee: Thomas Parsons

13 September 2022 8	Hartlepool United	1–1	Crewe Alexandra	Hartlepool
19:45 BST	Umerah 33' (pen.)	Report	Agyei 86'	Stadium: Victoria Park; Attendance: 4,002 (116 away); Referee: Martin Coy

17 September 2022 9	Sutton United	2–0	Hartlepool United	Sutton
15:00 BST	Randall 53'; Beautyman 66'	Report		Stadium: Gander Green Lane; Attendance: 2,766 (162 away); Referee: Will Finnie

24 September 2022 10	Hartlepool United	0–0	Gillingham	Hartlepool
15:00 BST		Report		Stadium: Victoria Park; Attendance: 4,298 (223 away); Referee: Neil Hair

30 September 2022 11	Mansfield Town	2–2	Hartlepool United	Mansfield
19:45 BST	Lapslie 51'; Harbottle 59'	Report	Umerah 62', 89'	Stadium: One Call Stadium; Attendance: 6,891 (302 away); Referee: Craig Hicks

4 October 2022 12	Hartlepool United	2–1	Doncaster Rovers	Hartlepool
19:45 BST	Umerah 38'; McDonald 86'	Report	Faulkner 62'	Stadium: Victoria Park; Attendance: 4,296 (600 away); Referee: Andy Haines
Note: Fixture was postponed as a mark of respect following the passing of Queen Elizabeth II. The match was moved from 10 September 2022 to 4 October 2022.

8 October 2022 13	Hartlepool United	1–3	Carlisle United	Hartlepool
15:00 BST	Lacey 43'	Report	Moxon 53'; Patrick 75', 82'	Stadium: Victoria Park; Attendance: 5,525 (691 away); Referee: Tom Reeves

15 October 2022 14	Harrogate Town	2–1	Hartlepool United	Harrogate
12:30 BST	Pattison 25'; Muldoon 43'	Report	Umerah 85'	Stadium: Wetherby Road; Attendance: 2,075; Referee: Andrew Kitchen

22 October 2022 15	Swindon Town	2–1	Hartlepool United	Swindon
15:00 BST	Williams 12'; Jephcott 17'	Report	Oduor 28'	Stadium: County Ground; Attendance: 8,527 (123 away); Referee: Darren Drysdale

25 October 2022 16	Hartlepool United	0–2	Salford City	Hartlepool
19:45 BST		Report	Leak 26'; Galbraith 90'	Stadium: Victoria Park; Attendance: 3,707; Referee: Darren Handley

29 October 2022 17	Hartlepool United	2–1	Grimsby Town	Hartlepool
15:00 BST	Lacey 78'; Maher 82' (o.g.)	Report	Holohan 6'	Stadium: Victoria Park; Attendance: 4,600 (716 away); Referee: Sam Barrott

12 November 2022 18	Stevenage	1–0	Hartlepool United	Stevenage
15:00	Rose 79'	Report		Stadium: Broadhall Way; Attendance: 3,626 (276 away); Referee: Carl Boyeson

19 November 2022 19	Barrow	3–1	Hartlepool United	Barrow-in-Furness
15:00	Gordon 4'; Whitfield 8'; Waters 21'	Report	Missilou 77'	Stadium: Holker Street; Attendance: 3,284 (345 away); Referee: Leigh Doughty

3 December 2022 20	Hartlepool United	0–5	Stockport County	Hartlepool
15:00		Report	Wootton 16', 20'; Madden 61'; Camps 67'; Collar 85'	Stadium: Victoria Park; Attendance: 5,079 (685 away); Referee: Ben Toner

9 December 2022 21	Crawley Town	0–2	Hartlepool United	Crawley
19:45		Report	Menayese 64'; Johnson 81' (o.g.)	Stadium: Broadfield Stadium; Attendance: 1,955 (128 away); Referee: Tom Nield

26 December 2022 22	Rochdale	1–2	Hartlepool United	Rochdale
15:00	Henderson 60'	Report	Menayese 39'; Cooke 80'	Stadium: Spotland Stadium; Attendance: 3,243 (680 away); Referee: Thomas Kirk

29 December 2022 23	Hartlepool United	1–2	Mansfield Town	Hartlepool
19:45	Hamilton 19'	Report	Oates 47'; Hawkins 60'	Stadium: Victoria Park; Attendance: 4,599; Referee: Martin Coy

1 January 2023 24	Hartlepool United	3–3	Harrogate Town	Hartlepool
15:00	Umerah 45'; Sylla 46'; Shelton 63'	Report	Pattison 4'; Folarin 49'; Thomson 73'	Stadium: Victoria Park; Attendance: 4,566 (180 away); Referee: Marc Edwards

14 January 2023 25	Gillingham	2–0	Hartlepool United	Gillingham
15:00	Nichols 40'; Jefferies 59'	Report		Stadium: Priestfield Stadium; Attendance: 6,003 (255 away); Referee: Robert Lewis

21 January 2023 26	Hartlepool United	2–0	Rochdale	Hartlepool
15:00	Umerah 54'; Hamilton 64'	Report		Stadium: Victoria Park; Attendance: 4,353 (285 away); Referee: Marc Edwards

24 January 2023 27	Carlisle United	3–1	Hartlepool United	Carlisle
19:45	Feeney 6'; Dennis 26', 66'	Report	Umerah 28'	Stadium: Brunton Park; Attendance: 5,172 (342 away); Referee: Sam Barrott

28 January 2023 28	Hartlepool United	1–2	Colchester United	Hartlepool
15:00	Sterry 82'	Report	Kelleher 5'; Sterry 87' (o.g.)	Stadium: Victoria Park; Attendance: 4,105; Referee: Simon Mather

4 February 2023 29	Doncaster Rovers	0–1	Hartlepool United	Doncaster
15:00		Report	Dodds 88'	Stadium: Eco-Power Stadium; Attendance: 7,002 (1,032 away); Referee: Sam Allison

11 February 2023 30	Hartlepool United	2–2	Sutton United	Hartlepool
15:00	Kemp 43'; Dodds 45'	Report	Ajiboye 18'; Angol 31'	Stadium: Victoria Park; Attendance: 4,385 (98 away); Referee: Andy Haines

14 February 2023 31	Crewe Alexandra	2–0	Hartlepool United	Crewe
19:45	Ainley 31'; Finnigan 39'	Report		Stadium: Gresty Road; Attendance: 3,110 (107 away); Referee: Neil Hair

18 February 2023 32	AFC Wimbledon	2–2	Hartlepool United	Merton
15:00	Al-Hamadi 31'; Jaiyesimi 53'	Report	Kemp 71', 90'	Stadium: Plough Lane; Attendance: 7,495 (467 away); Referee: Craig Hicks

21 February 2023 33	Hartlepool United	0–1	Newport County	Hartlepool
19:45		Report	Demetriou 90'	Stadium: Victoria Park; Attendance: 3,908 (122 away); Referee: Ben Speedie

25 February 2023 34	Hartlepool United	3–3	Walsall	Hartlepool
15:00	Kemp 56' (pen.), 90' (pen.); Jennings 90'	Report	Knowles 33'; Hutchinson 49'; Stevens 72'	Stadium: Victoria Park; Attendance: 4,418 (340 away); Referee: Darren Drysdale

4 March 2023 35	Tranmere Rovers	1–1	Hartlepool United	Birkenhead
15:00	Hawkes 68' (pen.)	Report	Cooke 44'	Stadium: Prenton Park; Attendance: 6,320 (418 away); Referee: James Oldham

11 March 2023 36	Hartlepool United	1–1	Northampton Town	Hartlepool
15:00	Umerah 37'	Report	Hoskins 81'	Stadium: Victoria Park; Attendance: 5,021 (363 away); Referee: Thomas Kirk

18 March 2023 37	Bradford City	2–2	Hartlepool United	Bradford
13:00	Cook 49', 78'	Report	Cooke 33'; Kemp 71'	Stadium: Valley Parade; Attendance: 18,137 (1,045 away); Referee: Declan Bourne

25 March 2023 38	Hartlepool United	1–1	Leyton Orient	Hartlepool
15:00	Jennings 81'	Report	Smyth 48'	Stadium: Victoria Park; Attendance: 5,012 (502 away); Referee: Edward Duckworth

1 April 2023 39	Hartlepool United	2–1	Swindon Town	Hartlepool
15:00	Jennings 88'; Finney 90'	Report	Hepburn-Murphy 4'	Stadium: Victoria Park; Attendance: 4,815 (433 away); Referee: Carl Boyeson

7 April 2023 40	Grimsby Town	1–4	Hartlepool United	Cleethorpes
15:00	Efete 54'	Report	Kemp 19', 68' (pen.), 72'; Umerah 76'	Stadium: Blundell Park; Attendance: 7,425 (1,182 away); Referee: Anthony Backhouse

10 April 2023 41	Hartlepool United	1–1	Stevenage	Hartlepool
15:00	Featherstone 46'	Report	Rose 25'	Stadium: Victoria Park; Attendance: 5,687 (171 away); Referee: Paul Howard

15 April 2023 42	Newport County	2–0	Hartlepool United	Newport
15:00	Bogle 17'; Demetriou 44'	Report		Stadium: Rodney Parade; Attendance: 4,451 (269 away); Referee: Darren Handley

18 April 2023 43	Salford City	2–0	Hartlepool United	Salford
19:45	Smith 14'; Barry 28'	Report		Stadium: Peninsula Stadium; Attendance: 2,139 (500 away); Referee: Ollie Yates

22 April 2023 44	Hartlepool United	0–2	Crawley Town	Hartlepool
15:00		Report	Telford 40', 66'	Stadium: Victoria Park; Attendance: 6,812 (259 away); Referee: Sam Barrott

29 April 2023 45	Hartlepool United	3–1	Barrow	Hartlepool
15:00	Hamilton 42'; Sterry 68'; Jennings 90'	Report	Garner 21'	Stadium: Victoria Park; Attendance: 4,551 (338 away); Referee: Simon Mather

8 May 2023 46	Stockport County	1–1	Hartlepool United	Stockport
12:30	Camps 39' (pen.)	Report	Cooke 62'	Stadium: Edgeley Park; Attendance: 10,118; Referee: Tom Reeves

=== FA Cup ===
On 19 October 2022, Hartlepool were drawn away to National League side Solihull Moors. In the second round they faced Harrogate Town at home. A third round tie against Stoke City at home was next for the Pools.

5 November 2022 1	Solihull Moors	2–2	Hartlepool United	Damson Park, Solihull
15:00	Dallas 51'; Sbarra 84'	Report	Umerah 18'; Hamilton 69'	Attendance: 1,658; Referee: Paul Howard

15 November 2022 Replay	Hartlepool United	1–1 (4–3 p)	Solihull Moors	Victoria Park, Hartlepool
19:45	Tumilty 90'	Report	Barnett 8'	Attendance: 2,170 (110 away); Referee: Seb Stockbridge
	Penalties
	Featherstone (penalty scored); Ferguson (penalty missed); Robinson (penalty scored); Hastie (penalty scored); Grey (penalty scored)		Storer (penalty missed); Kelly (penalty missed); Coker (penalty scored); Jones (penalty scored); Reid (penalty scored)

26 November 2022 2	Hartlepool United	3–1	Harrogate Town	Victoria Park, Hartlepool
15:00	Cooke 41'; Umerah 45' (pen.), 71'	Report	Coley 73'	Attendance: 2,772 (294 away); Referee: Sam Purkiss

8 January 2023 3	Hartlepool United	0–3	Stoke City	Victoria Park, Hartlepool
14:00 GMT		Report	Murray 16' (o.g.); Brown 43'; Menayese 48' (o.g.)	Attendance: 4,340 (585 away); Referee: Ben Toner

=== EFL Cup ===
On 23 June 2022, Hartlepool were drawn away to Championship side Blackburn Rovers. On 29 June 2022, the final date was finalised for the Blackburn fixture.

10 August 2022 1	Blackburn Rovers	4–0	Hartlepool United	Ewood Park, Blackburn
19:45	Wharton 32'; Dack 47'; Dolan 51'; Markanday 73'	Report		Attendance: 6,844 (456 away); Referee: James Bell

=== EFL Trophy ===
On 23 June, the group stage draw was finalised.

Pos	Div	Team	Pld	W	PW	PL	L	GF	GA	GD	Pts	Qualification
1	ACA	Everton U21	3	1	1	1	0	10	4	+6	6	Advance to Round 2
2	L1	Morecambe	3	0	2	0	1	4	5	−1	4	Advance to Round 2
3	L2	Harrogate Town	3	1	0	1	1	3	4	−1	4	
4	L2	Hartlepool United	3	1	0	1	1	2	6	−4	4	

Source: EFL.com

30 August 2022 Group stage	Hartlepool United	2–0	Harrogate Town	Victoria Park, Hartlepool
19:00 BST	Ndjoli 17', 33'	Report		Attendance: 1,500; Referee: Anthony Backhouse

20 September 2022 Group stage	Morecambe	0–0 (4–2 p)	Hartlepool United	Mazuma Stadium, Morecambe
19:00 BST		Report		Attendance: 934 (71 away); Referee: Martin Woods
	Penalties
	Weir (penalty scored); Stockton (penalty scored); Cooney (penalty scored); Love (penalty scored)		Murray (penalty missed); Ferguson (penalty missed); Shelton (penalty scored); Crawford (penalty scored)

18 October 2022 Group stage	Hartlepool United	0–6	Everton U21	Victoria Park, Hartlepool
19:00 BST		Report	Cannon 9', 45'; Hunt 20'; Mills 28', 53'; Whitaker 71'	Attendance: 1,247 (101 away); Referee: Adam Herczeg

== Player details ==
No.	Pos	Nat	Player	Total		League Two		FA Cup		EFL Cup		EFL Trophy	
No.	Pos	Nat	Player	Apps	Goals	Apps	Goals	Apps	Goals	Apps	Goals	Apps	Goals
1	GK	(England) ENG	Ben Killip	35	0	29	0	3	0	1	0	2	0
2	DF	(England) ENG	Jamie Sterry	28	2	26	2	0	0	0	0	2	0
3	DF	(England) ENG	David Ferguson	49	1	44	1	3	0	0	0	2	0
4	MF	(Senegal) SEN	Mouhamed Niang	17	0	13	0	0	0	1	0	3	0
5	DF	(Scotland) SCO	Euan Murray	36	0	29	0	3	0	1	0	3	0
6	MF	(England) ENG	Mark Shelton	17	1	13	1	1	0	1	0	2	0
7	MF	(Scotland) SCO	Jake Hastie	24	0	18	0	4	0	1	0	1	0
8	MF	(England) ENG	Nicky Featherstone	39	1	33	1	4	0	1	0	1	0
9	FW	(England) ENG	Josh Umerah	47	15	41	12	4	3	1	0	1	0
10	MF	(England) ENG	Callum Cooke	40	5	34	4	4	1	1	0	1	0
11	MF	(England) ENG	Wes McDonald	35	3	31	3	2	0	0	0	2	0
12	FW	(England) ENG	Joe Grey	23	0	17	0	4	0	0	0	2	0
14	DF	(Scotland) SCO	Brody Paterson	16	0	11	0	1	0	1	0	3	0
15	DF	(Albania) ALB	Edon Pruti	21	0	21	0	0	0	0	0	0	0
16	DF	(England) ENG	Matthew Dolan	12	0	12	0	0	0	0	0	0	0
17	MF	(England) ENG	Ellis Taylor	8	0	4	0	1	0	1	0	2	0
18	FW	(England) ENG	Mikael Ndjoli	11	2	8	0	0	0	0	0	3	2
19	FW	(Scotland) SCO	Jack Hamilton	38	4	31	3	4	1	1	0	2	0
20	MF	(France) FRA	Mohamed Sylla	42	1	35	1	4	0	1	0	2	0
21	GK	(Wales) WAL	Kyle Letheren	1	0	0	0	0	0	0	0	1	0
22	MF	(England) ENG	Tom Crawford	21	0	17	0	0	0	1	0	3	0
23	DF	(Wales) WAL	Rollin Menayese	23	2	18	2	2	0	1	0	2	0
24	DF	(England) ENG	Alex Lacey	21	2	17	2	1	0	0	0	3	0
26	DF	(Scotland) SCO	Reghan Tumilty	25	1	18	0	4	1	1	0	2	0
27	MF	(Kenya) KEN	Clarke Oduor	14	1	11	1	3	0	0	0	0	0
28	MF	(Democratic Republic of the Congo) COD	Christopher Missilou	5	1	4	1	1	0	0	0	0	0
29	DF	(England) ENG	Louis Stephenson	2	0	0	0	2	0	0	0	0	0
30	MF	(England) ENG	Campbell Darcy	1	0	0	0	1	0	0	0	0	0
31	FW	(England) ENG	Joseph Kitching	1	0	0	0	1	0	0	0	0	0
32	GK	(England) ENG	Alex Cairns	1	0	0	0	1	0	0	0	0	0
33	FW	(Jamaica) JAM	Theo Robinson	9	0	6	0	2	0	0	0	1	0
35	DF	(England) ENG	Taylor Foran	11	0	11	0	0	0	0	0	0	0
36	FW	(England) ENG	Connor Jennings	18	4	18	4	0	0	0	0	0	0
37	DF	(England) ENG	Daniel Dodds	19	2	19	2	0	0	0	0	0	0
38	MF	(England) ENG	Oliver Finney	12	1	12	1	0	0	0	0	0	0
39	DF	(England) ENG	Peter Hartley	7	0	7	0	0	0	0	0	0	0
40	MF	(England) ENG	Dan Kemp	16	9	16	9	0	0	0	0	0	0
41	GK	(Poland) POL	Jakub Stolarczyk	17	0	17	0	0	0	0	0	0	0
42	MF	(Cyprus) CYP	Tayt Trusty	4	0	4	0	0	0	0	0	0	0
44	MF	(England) ENG	Brendan Kiernan	6	0	6	0	0	0	0	0	0	0
48	FW	(England) ENG	Leon Clarke	3	0	3	0	0	0	0	0	0	0

=== Goalscorers ===
Rank	Name	League Two	FA Cup	League Cup	Other	Total
1	Josh Umerah	12	3	0	0	15
2	Dan Kemp	9	0	0	0	9
3	Callum Cooke	4	1	0	0	5
4	Jack Hamilton	3	1	0	0	4
4	Connor Jennings	4	0	0	0	4
5	Wes McDonald	3	0	0	0	3
6	Daniel Dodds	2	0	0	0	2
6	Alex Lacey	2	0	0	0	2
6	Rollin Menayese	2	0	0	0	2
6	Mikael Ndjoli	0	0	0	2	2
6	Jamie Sterry	2	0	0	0	2
7	Nicky Featherstone	1	0	0	0	1
7	David Ferguson	1	0	0	0	1
7	Oliver Finney	1	0	0	0	1
7	Christopher Missilou	1	0	0	0	1
7	Clarke Oduor	1	0	0	0	1
7	Mark Shelton	1	0	0	0	1
7	Mohamed Sylla	1	0	0	0	1
7	Reghan Tumilty	0	1	0	0	1

=== Clean sheets ===
Rank	Name	League Two	FA Cup	League Cup	Other	Total
1	Ben Killip	5	0	0	2	7
2	Jakub Stolarczyk	1	0	0	0	1

=== Suspensions ===
Date Incurred	Name	Games Missed	Reason	Ref
17 September 2022	Tom Crawford	1	Booked	
14 February 2023	Jamie Sterry	3	(red card) (vs. Crewe Alexandra)	

== Transfers ==
=== Transfers in ===
Date	Position	Name	From	Fee	Ref
16 June 2022	GK	Kyle Letheren	Morecambe	Free	
21 June 2022	DF	Reghan Tumilty	Raith Rovers	Free	
23 June 2022	MF	Mouhamed Niang	Partick Thistle	Free	
24 June 2022	DF	Euan Murray	Kilmarnock	Free	
24 June 2022	DF	Alex Lacey	Notts County	Free	
24 June 2022	MF	Jake Hastie	Rangers	Free	
4 July 2022	DF	Brody Paterson	Celtic	Free	
6 July 2022	MF	Callum Cooke	Bradford City	Free	
14 July 2022	FW	Josh Umerah	Wealdstone	Undisclosed	
22 July 2022	FW	Mikael Ndjoli	Virginia Beach City	Free	
4 August 2022	MF	Mohamed Sylla	Aldershot Town	Free	
12 August 2022	MF	Wes McDonald	Morecambe	Free	
13 October 2022	FW	Theo Robinson	Bradford City	Free	
18 November 2022	MF	Christopher Missilou	Oldham Athletic	Free	
9 January 2023	DF	Peter Hartley	Jamshedpur	Free	
11 January 2023	DF	Daniel Dodds	Middlesbrough	Undisclosed	
13 January 2023	DF	Edon Pruti	Brentford	Undisclosed	
31 January 2023	MF	Brendan Kiernan	Walsall	Free	
31 January 2023	FW	Connor Jennings	Stockport County	Free	
31 January 2023	MF	Oliver Finney	Crewe Alexandra	Undisclosed	
14 February 2023	FW	Leon Clarke	Bristol Rovers	Free	

=== Loans in ===
Date	Position	Player	From	End date	Ref
18 July 2022	DF	Rollin Menayese	Walsall	End of season	
20 July 2022	FW	Jack Hamilton	Livingston	End of season	
28 July 2022	MF	Ellis Taylor	Sunderland	1 January 2023 (Note: Taylor's loan was originally scheduled to last until the end of the season but he was returned by Hartlepool on 1 January.)	
1 September 2022	MF	Clarke Oduor	Barnsley	1 January 2023 (Note: Oduor's loan was originally scheduled to last until the end of the season but he was returned by Hartlepool on 1 January.)	
26 November 2022	GK	Alex Cairns	Fleetwood Town	3 December 2022	
5 January 2023	MF	Matthew Dolan	Newport County	End of season	
23 January 2023	GK	Jakub Stolarczyk	Leicester City	End of season	
27 January 2023	MF	Tayt Trusty	Blackpool	End of season	
31 January 2023	MF	Dan Kemp	Milton Keynes Dons	End of season	
31 January 2023	DF	Taylor Foran	Arsenal	End of season	

=== Loans out ===
Date	Position	Player	To	End date	Ref
7 September 2022	GK	Patrick Boyes	Pontefract Collieries	18 November 2022 (Note: On 18 November, Boyes was recalled back from his loan at Pontefract and joined Stockton.)	
18 November 2022	GK	Patrick Boyes	Stockton Town	26 December 2022	
9 January 2023	DF	Brody Paterson	Cove Rangers	End of season	
27 January 2023	GK	Patrick Boyes	Liversedge	25 March 2023 (Note: On 25 March, Boyes was recalled back from his loan.)	
16 March 2023	FW	Mikael Ndjoli	Radcliffe	End of season	
17 March 2023	FW	Leon Clarke	Rushall Olympic	End of season	

=== Transfers out ===
Date	Position	Name	To	Fee	Ref
1 June 2022	MF	Martin Smith	South Shields	Free	
6 June 2022	DF	Gary Liddle	South Shields	Free	
21 June 2022	MF	Luke Molyneux	Doncaster Rovers	Free	
27 June 2022	DF	Timi Odusina	Bradford City	Undisclosed	
30 June 2022	FW	Omar Bogle	Newport County	Undisclosed	
1 July 2022	DF	Neill Byrne	Tranmere Rovers	Undisclosed	
2 July 2022	DF	Zaine Francis-Angol	Oldham Athletic	Free	
8 July 2022	MF	Josh MacDonald	Marske United	Free	
20 July 2022	FW	Olufela Olomola	Wealdstone	Free	
29 July 2022	DF	Reagan Ogle	Scunthorpe United	Free	
2 August 2022	FW	Marcus Carver	Scunthorpe United	Undisclosed	
20 January 2023	MF	Christopher Missilou		Released	
20 January 2023	MF	Mark Shelton	Oldham Athletic	Undisclosed	
7 February 2023	DF	Reghan Tumilty	Hamilton Academical	Free	
2 March 2023	FW	Theo Robinson	Brackley Town	Free	

== Awards ==
- EFL League Two Player of the Month February 2023: Dan Kemp

== See also ==
- 2022–23 in English football
- 2022–23 EFL League Two
- 2021–22 Hartlepool United F.C. season
- List of Hartlepool United F.C. seasons
