= Brody Paterson =

English footballer (born 2001)

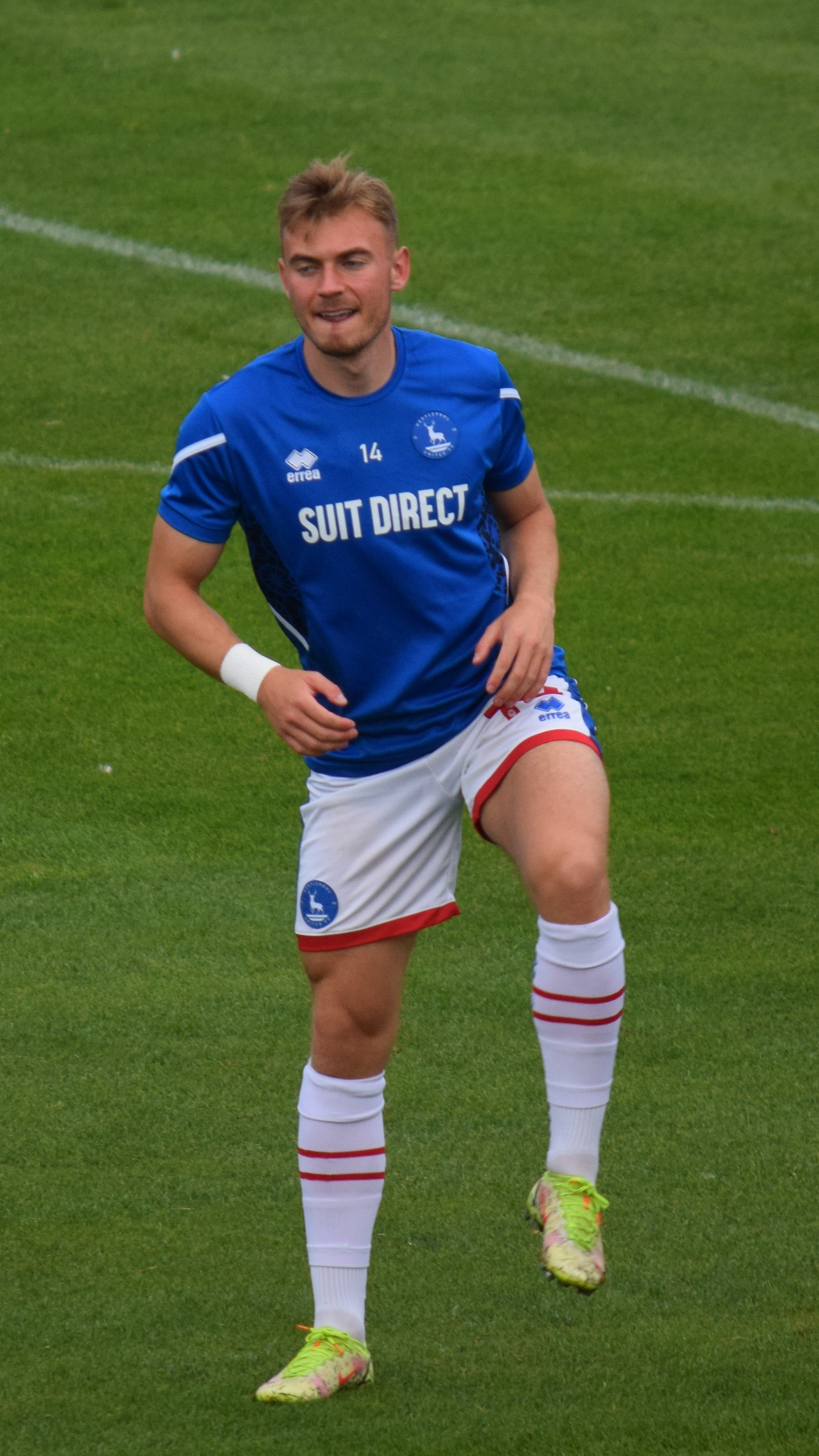
- Paterson warming up for Hartlepool United in 2022

Personal information
- Date of birth: 24 April 2001 (age 25)
- Place of birth: Kirkcaldy, Scotland
- Positions: Fullback; winger

Team information
- Current team: Arbroath
- Number: 4

Youth career
- Dunfermline Athletic
- 2013–2020: Celtic

Senior career*
Years	Team	Apps	(Gls)
2020–2022	Celtic	0	(0)
2020–2021	→ Queen's Park (loan)	11	(0)
2022	→ Airdrieonians (loan)	13	(0)
2022–2024	Hartlepool United	24	(0)
2023	→ Cove Rangers (loan)	2	(0)
2024	→ Kelty Hearts (loan)	17	(0)
2024–2026	Kelty Hearts	58	(0)
2026–	Arbroath	7	(0)
- * Club domestic league appearances and goals as of 23:05, 17 October 2026

Brody Paterson (born 24 April 2001) is a Scottish professional footballer who plays for Scottish Championship club Arbroath.

== Career ==
Born in Kirkcaldy, Paterson began his playing career with Dunfermline Athletic, before moving to Celtic's youth sector at the age of 12. In June 2018, he signed his first professional contract with Celtic, which was then renewed in May 2020, when he penned a new three-year deal.

Whilst under contract with Celtic, Paterson spent time on loan at Queen's Park, where he won the 2020–21 Scottish League Two, and then Airdrieonians, where he reached the promotional play-offs of the 2021–22 Scottish League One, as the club eventually lost to Queen's Park in the final round. At the end of the latter season, Paterson left Celtic after turning down an offer for a new contract extension.

On 4 July 2022, Paterson joined English League Two side Hartlepool United on a two-year deal. On 9 January 2023, Paterson signed for Cove Rangers on loan for the remainder of the season, re-joining with his former manager at Hartlepool, Paul Hartley. At the end of the 2022–23 season, the Hartlepool Mail reported that Paterson would be allowed to leave the club permanently. In January 2024, he signed on loan for Kelty Hearts until the end of the season. He was released by Hartlepool United at the end of the 2023–24 season. In June 2024, it was announced Paterson had signed for Kelty Hearts on a permanent basis.

On 6 June 2026, Paterson signed a one-year deal with Scottish Championship side Arbroath.

== Style of play ==
Paterson is a left-back, who can also play as a left winger, and provides cover both in defensive and offensive actions.

He has cited Kieran Tierney as his main source of inspiration.

== Career statistics ==
As of match played 2 May 2026

Appearances and goals by club, season and competition
Club	Season	League			National Cup		League Cup		Other		Total	
Club	Season	Division	Apps	Goals	Apps	Goals	Apps	Goals	Apps	Goals	Apps	Goals
Celtic	2021–22	Scottish Premiership	0	0	0	0	0	0	1 (Note: Appearances in Scottish Challenge Cup)	0	1	0
Queen's Park (loan)	2020–21	Scottish League Two	11	0	0	0	3	0	0	0	14	0
Airdrieonians (loan)	2021–22	Scottish League One	13	0	0	0	0	0	4 (Note: Appearances in Scottish Division play-offs)	0	17	0
Hartlepool United	2022–23	League Two	11	0	1	0	1	0	3 (Note: Appearances in EFL Trophy)	0	16	0
Hartlepool United	2023–24	National League	13	0	0	0	0	0	0	0	13	0
Hartlepool United	Total		24	0	1	0	1	0	3	0	29	0
Cove Rangers (loan)	2022–23	Scottish Championship	2	0	1	0	0	0	0	0	3	0
Kelty Hearts	2023–24	Scottish League One	17	0	1	0	0	0	0	0	18	0
Kelty Hearts	2024–25	Scottish League One	36	0	1	0	4	0	2	0	43	0
Kelty Hearts	2025–26	Scottish League One	22	0	2	0	4	0	4	1	32	1
Kelty Hearts	Total		75	0	4	0	8	0	6	1	93	1
Career total			125	0	6	0	12	0	14	1	157	1

== Honours ==
Queen's Park

- Scottish League Two: 2020–21

Airdrieonians

- Scottish League One runner-up: 2021–22
