= 2022–23 Middlesbrough F.C. season =

Middlesbrough
2022–23 season
- Owner: Steve Gibson
- Chairman: Steve Gibson
- Head coach: Chris Wilder (until 3 October); Leo Percovich (interim); Michael Carrick (from 24 October)
- Stadium: Riverside Stadium
- Championship: 4th
- Play-offs: Semi-finals
- FA Cup: Third round
- EFL Cup: First round
- Top goalscorer: League: Chuba Akpom (28); All: Chuba Akpom (29)
- Highest home attendance: 32,187 vs Coventry City, Championship, 8 May 2023
- Lowest home attendance: 9,361 vs Barnsley, EFL Cup, 10 August 2022
- Biggest win: 5–0 vs Reading, Championship, 4 March 2023
- Biggest defeat: 1–5 vs Brighton, FA Cup, 7 January 2023
Home colours	Away colours	Third colours

The 2022–23 season was the 147th season in the existence of Middlesbrough Football Club and the club's sixth consecutive season in the Championship. In addition to the league, they also competed in the FA Cup and the EFL Cup.

== Statistics ==
As of 20 May 2023
Players with names in italics and marked * were on loan from another club for the whole of their season with Middlesbrough

No.	Pos	Nat	Player	Total		Championship		Play-Offs		FA Cup		EFL Cup	
No.	Pos	Nat	Player	Apps	Goals	Apps	Goals	Apps	Goals	Apps	Goals	Apps	Goals
1	GK	(United States) USA	Zack Steffen*	45	0	42+0	0	2+0	0	1+0	0	0+0	0
2	MF	(England) ENG	Isaiah Jones	37	3	24+10	3	1+1	0	0+1	0	0+0	0
3	MF	(England) ENG	Ryan Giles*	48	0	43+2	0	2+0	0	1+0	0	0+0	0
4	MF	(England) ENG	Alex Mowatt*	31	0	11+17	0	2+0	0	0+1	0	0+0	0
5	DF	(England) ENG	Matt Clarke	6	0	6+0	0	0+0	0	0+0	0	0+0	0
6	DF	(England) ENG	Dael Fry	32	0	26+4	0	0+0	0	1+0	0	1+0	0
7	MF	(England) ENG	Daniel Barlaser	12	0	3+8	0	0+1	0	0+0	0	0+0	0
8	MF	(Australia) AUS	Riley McGree	46	6	35+8	6	2+0	0	1+0	0	0+0	0
9	FW	(Brazil) BRA	Rodrigo Muniz*	17	2	9+8	2	0+0	0	0+0	0	0+0	0
10	FW	(England) ENG	Cameron Archer*	23	11	17+3	11	2+0	0	0+1	0	0+0	0
11	MF	(England) ENG	Aaron Ramsey*	11	5	8+3	5	0+0	0	0+0	0	0+0	0
14	DF	(England) ENG	Tommy Smith	40	0	31+5	0	2+0	0	1+0	0	1+0	0
15	DF	(Netherlands) NED	Anfernee Dijksteel	22	0	10+10	0	0+1	0	0+0	0	1+0	0
16	MF	(England) ENG	Jonny Howson	45	0	43+1	0	0+0	0	1+0	0	0+0	0
17	DF	(Northern Ireland) NIR	Paddy McNair	34	1	26+4	1	2+0	0	1+0	0	1+0	0
21	FW	(Finland) FIN	Marcus Forss	42	10	24+14	10	1+1	0	1+0	0	0+1	0
22	DF	(England) ENG	Darnell Fisher	1	0	0+1	0	0+0	0	0+0	0	0+0	0
23	GK	(England) ENG	Liam Roberts	5	0	4+0	0	0+0	0	0+0	0	1+0	0
25	MF	(England) ENG	Matt Crooks	40	7	18+19	7	0+2	0	1+0	0	0+0	0
26	DF	(Republic of Ireland) IRL	Darragh Lenihan	43	0	40+1	0	2+0	0	0+0	0	0+0	0
27	DF	(England) ENG	Marc Bola	27	0	9+16	0	0+0	0	0+1	0	1+0	0
29	FW	(England) ENG	Chuba Akpom	42	29	35+3	28	2+0	0	1+0	1	0+1	0
30	MF	(Scotland) SCO	Hayden Hackney	38	3	32+2	3	2+0	0	1+0	0	1+0	0
31	FW	(England) ENG	Sonny Finch	4	0	0+3	0	0+0	0	0+0	0	1+0	0
32	DF	(England) ENG	Bryant Bilongo	1	0	0+0	0	0+0	0	0+0	0	0+1	0
33	MF	(England) ENG	Joe Gibson	1	0	0+0	0	0+0	0	0+0	0	1+0	0
35	MF	(England) ENG	Isaac Fletcher	1	0	0+0	0	0+0	0	0+0	0	0+1	0
44	MF	(England) ENG	Pharrell Willis	1	0	0+1	0	0+0	0	0+0	0	0+0	0
Out on loan
13	FW	(United States) USA	Matthew Hoppe	6	0	0+6	0	0+0	0	0+0	0	0+0	0
19	FW	(England) ENG	Josh Coburn	1	0	0+1	0	0+0	0	0+0	0	0+0	0
No longer at the club
18	FW	(England) ENG	Duncan Watmore	23	5	10+11	5	0+0	0	0+1	0	1+0	0
20	MF	(Northern Ireland) NIR	Caolan Boyd-Munce	2	0	0+1	0	0+0	0	0+0	0	1+0	0
34	DF	(England) ENG	Daniel Dodds	1	0	0+0	0	0+0	0	0+0	0	0+1	0

=== Goals record ===
As of 20 May 2023

Rank	No.	Nat.	Po.	Name	Championship	FA Cup	EFL Cup	Total
1	29	(England)	CF	Chuba Akpom	28	1	0	29
2	10	(England)	CF	Cameron Archer	11	0	0	11
3	21	(Finland)	CF	Marcus Forss	10	0	0	10
4	25	(England)	AM	Matt Crooks	7	0	0	7
5	8	(Australia)	AM	Riley McGree	6	0	0	6
6	18	(England)	CF	Duncan Watmore	5	0	0	5
6	11	(England)	LW	Aaron Ramsey	5	0	0	5
8	2	(England)	RM	Isaiah Jones	3	0	0	3
8	30	(Scotland)	CM	Hayden Hackney	3	0	0	3
10	9	(Brazil)	CF	Rodrigo Muniz	2	0	0	2
11	17	(Northern Ireland)	CB	Paddy McNair	1	0	0	1
Own Goals					3	0	0	3
Total					84	1	0	85

=== Assists ===
As of 20 May 2023

Rank	No.	Nat.	Po.	Name	Championship	FA Cup	EFL Cup	Total
1	3	(England)	LB	Ryan Giles	11	1	0	12
2	10	(England)	CF	Cameron Archer	6	0	0	6
2	25	(England)	AM	Matt Crooks	6	0	0	6
4	21	(Finland)	CF	Marcus Forss	5	0	0	5
4	2	(England)	RB	Isaiah Jones	5	0	0	5
6	30	(Scotland)	CM	Hayden Hackney	4	0	0	4
7	26	(Republic of Ireland)	CB	Darragh Lenihan	3	0	0	3
7	4	(England)	CM	Jonny Howson	3	0	0	3
7	8	(Australia)	AM	Riley McGree	3	0	0	3
10	4	(England)	CM	Alex Mowatt	2	0	0	2
10	29	(England)	CF	Chuba Akpom	2	0	0	2
12	1	(United States)	GK	Zack Steffen	1	0	0	1
12	7	(England)	CM	Daniel Barlaser	1	0	0	1
12	11	(England)	LW	Aaron Ramsey	1	0	0	1
12	14	(England)	CB	Tommy Smith	1	0	0	1
12	15	(Netherlands)	RB	Anfernee Dijksteel	1	0	0	1
Total					55	1	0	56

=== Disciplinary record ===
As of 8 May 2023

Rank	No.	Nat.	Po.	Name	Championship			FA Cup			EFL Cup			Total		
Rank	No.	Nat.	Po.	Name	Yellow card	(yellow card) (yellow-red card)	Red card	Yellow card	(yellow card) (yellow-red card)	Red card	Yellow card	(yellow card) (yellow-red card)	Red card	Yellow card	(yellow card) (yellow-red card)	Red card
1	14	(England)	CB	Tommy Smith	10	0	0	0	0	0	0	0	0	10	0	0
2	16	(England)	CM	Jonny Howson	9	0	0	0	0	0	0	0	0	9	0	0
2	30	(Scotland)	CM	Hayden Hackney	9	0	0	0	0	0	0	0	0	9	0	0
4	25	(England)	CM	Matt Crooks	8	0	0	0	0	0	0	0	0	8	0	0
4	2	(England)	RB	Isaiah Jones	8	0	0	0	0	0	0	0	0	8	0	0
6	26	(Republic of Ireland)	CB	Darragh Lenihan	5	0	1	0	0	0	0	0	0	5	0	1
7	17	(Northern Ireland)	CB	Paddy McNair	5	0	0	0	0	0	0	0	0	5	0	0
7	21	(Finland)	CF	Marcus Forss	5	0	0	0	0	0	0	0	0	5	0	0
7	29	(England)	CF	Chuba Akpom	5	0	0	0	0	0	0	0	0	5	0	0
10	8	(Australia)	CM	Riley McGree	4	0	0	0	0	0	0	0	0	4	0	0
11	27	(England)	LB	Marc Bola	3	0	0	0	0	0	0	0	0	3	0	0
11	3	(England)	LB	Ryan Giles	2	0	0	1	0	0	0	0	0	3	0	0
13	6	(England)	CB	Dael Fry	2	0	1	0	0	0	0	0	0	2	0	1
13	15	(Netherlands)	RB	Anfernee Dijksteel	2	0	1	0	0	0	0	0	0	2	0	1
15	1	(United States)	GK	Zack Steffen	2	0	0	0	0	0	0	0	0	2	0	0
15	9	(Brazil)	CF	Rodrigo Muniz	2	0	0	0	0	0	0	0	0	2	0	0
17	4	(England)	CM	Alex Mowatt	1	0	0	0	0	0	0	0	0	1	0	0
17	5	(England)	CB	Matt Clarke	1	0	0	0	0	0	0	0	0	1	0	0
17	10	(England)	CF	Cameron Archer	1	0	0	0	0	0	0	0	0	1	0	0
17	11	(England)	LW	Aaron Ramsey	1	0	0	0	0	0	0	0	0	1	0	0
17	23	(England)	GK	Liam Roberts	1	0	0	0	0	0	0	0	0	1	0	0
Total					86	0	3	1	0	0	0	0	0	87	0	3

== Transfers ==
=== In ===
Date	Pos	Player	Transferred from	Fee	Ref
1 July 2022 (Note: The transfer was announced on 19 May, and would become official on July 1, once his Watford contract expired)	CM	(Sierra Leone) Kamil Conteh	(England) Watford	Free	
1 July 2022 (Note: The transfer was announced on 24 June, and would become official on July 1, once his Blackburn Rovers contract expired)	CB	(Republic of Ireland) Darragh Lenihan	(England) Blackburn Rovers	Free	
1 July 2022 (Note: The transfer was announced on 21 June, and would become official on July 1, once his Northampton Town contract expired)	GK	(England) Liam Roberts	(England) Northampton Town	Free	
27 July 2022	RB	(England) Tommy Smith	(England) Stoke City	Free	
28 July 2022	CF	(Finland) Marcus Forss	(England) Brentford	Undisclosed	
10 August 2022	CF	(United States) Matthew Hoppe	(Spain) Mallorca	Undisclosed	
25 August 2022	CB	(England) Matthew Clarke	(England) Brighton & Hove Albion	Undisclosed	
8 September 2022	CM	(Australia) Massimo Luongo	(England) Sheffield Wednesday	Free	
29 January 2023	CM	(England) Daniel Barlaser	(England) Rotherham	Undisclosed	

=== Out ===
Date	Pos	Player	Transferred to	Fee	Ref
10 June 2022 (Note: The transfer was announced on 27 May, and would become official on June once the transfer window opened)	GK	(North Macedonia) Dejan Stojanović	(Germany) Jahn Regensburg	Undisclosed	
10 June 2022	CB	(England) Nathan Wood	(Wales) Swansea City	Undisclosed	
17 June 2022	LW	(England) Toyosi Olusanya	(Scotland) St Mirren	Free	
30 June 2022	CF	(Dominican Republic) Alberto Baldé	(Northern Ireland) Portadown	Released	
30 June 2022	CB	(Ivory Coast) Sol Bamba	Unattached	Released	
30 June 2022	GK	(England) Jacob Bulmer	(England) York City	Released	
30 June 2022	CF	(England) Rumarn Burrell	(Scotland) Falkirk	Released	
30 June 2022	AM	(Netherlands) Malik Dijksteel	(England) Whitby Town	Released	
30 June 2022	LW	(England) Harry Green	Unattached	Released	
30 June 2022	LB	(England) Lucas Howe	Unattached	Released	
30 June 2022	CF	(England) Alex Hutchinson	(England) Thornaby	Released	
30 June 2022	CM	(England) Connor Malley	(England) Rochdale	Released	
30 June 2022	LB	(England) Josh Marshall	Unattached	Released	
30 June 2022	RB	(England) Lee Peltier	(England) Rotherham United	Released	
30 June 2022	LB	(Wales) Neil Taylor	Retired		
19 July 2022	RB	(England) Djed Spence	(England) Tottenham Hotspur	Undisclosed	
1 August 2022	LM	(England) Marcus Tavernier	(England) Bournemouth	Undisclosed	
13 August 2022	CF	(Uganda) Uche Ikpeazu	(Turkey) Konyaspor	Undisclosed	
1 September 2022	RW	(England) Sam Folarin	(England) Harrogate Town	Undisclosed	
5 January 2023	CM	(Australia) Massimo Luongo	(England) Ipswich Town	Mutual Consent	
11 January 2023	RB	(England) Daniel Dodds	(England) Hartlepool United	Undisclosed	
31 January 2023	RW	(England) Duncan Watmore	(England) Millwall	Undisclosed	
1 February 2023	CM	(Northern Ireland) Caolan Boyd-Munce	(Scotland) St Mirren	Mutual Consent	

=== Loans in ===
Date	Pos	Player	Loaned from	On loan until	Ref
23 June 2022	LM	(England) Ryan Giles	(England) Wolverhampton Wanderers	End of season	
19 July 2022	GK	(United States) Zack Steffen	(England) Manchester City	End of season	
13 August 2022	CM	(England) Alex Mowatt	(England) West Bromwich Albion	End of season	
21 August 2022	CF	(Brazil) Rodrigo Muniz	(England) Fulham	End of season	
6 January 2023	CF	(England) Cameron Archer	(England) Aston Villa	End of season	
31 January 2023	AM	(England) Aaron Ramsey	(England) Aston Villa	End of season	

=== Loans out ===
Date	Pos	Player	Loaned to	On loan until	Ref
19 June 2022	GK	(England) Joe Lumley	(England) Reading	End of season	
20 June 2022	GK	(England) Zach Hemming	(Scotland) Kilmarnock	End of season	
23 June 2022	GK	(England) Sol Brynn	(England) Swindon Town	End of season	
1 July 2022	GK	(Scotland) Max Metcalfe	(England) Spennymoor Town	End of season	
14 July 2022	CM	(Argentina) Martín Payero	(Argentina) Boca Juniors	End of season	
23 July 2022	CB	(England) Grant Hall	(England) Rotherham United	End of season	
26 July 2022	LB	(England) Hayden Coulson	(Scotland) Aberdeen	End of season	
26 August 2022	CM	(England) Isaac Fletcher	(England) Scunthorpe United	23 September 2022	
1 September 2022	CF	(England) Josh Coburn	(England) Bristol Rovers	End of season	
30 September 2022	RB	(England) Daniel Dodds	(England) Darlington	1 January 2023	
1 October 2022	CM	(Sierra Leone) Kamil Conteh	(England) Gateshead	End of season (Note: On 4 January, Conteh's loan at Gateshead was extended until end of the season)	
29 October 2022	LB	(England) Bryant Bilongo	(England) Woking	24 November 2022	
3 January 2023	LB	(England) Jack Robinson	(England) Carlisle United	End of season	
31 January 2023	CF	(United States) Matthew Hoppe	(Scotland) Hibernian	End of season	
31 January 2023	CF	(Republic of Ireland) Calum Kavanagh	(Wales) Newport County	End of season	
16 February 2023	GK	(England) Oliver Swan	(England) Marske United	End of season	

=== New contracts ===
==== First-team ====
Date signed	Number	Position	Nationality	Name	Contract length	Expiry	Ref.
9 December 2022	30	CM	(Scotland)	Hayden Hackney	3 years	2026	
22 February 2023	14	RB	(England)	Tommy Smith	2 years	2025	
28 March 2023	16	CM	(England)	Jonny Howson	1 year	2024	

== Pre-season and friendlies ==
On 25 May, Middlesbrough announced their pre-season plans with fixtures against Bishop Auckland (originally 25 June, later moved to 2 July), Morecambe and a training camp in Portugal. A day later, a trip to York City was added to the calendar. A fourth friendly, against Whitby Town was confirmed on May 31. In June, a friendly against Braga in Portugal was next to be added to the schedule. A sixth pre-season friendly was confirmed against Olympique de Marseille at home on July 22.

A mid-season friendly during the 2022 FIFA World Cup winter break against Hibernian was announced.

Win Draw Loss Fixtures

2 July 2022 Friendly	Bishop Auckland	0–5	Middlesbrough	Bishop Auckland
13:00 BST		Report	McGree 35'; Smith 41'; Dijksteel 48'; Callaghan 57' (o.g.); Coburn 73'	Stadium: Heritage Park

8 July 2022 Friendly	York City	2–3	Middlesbrough	Huntington
19:00 BST	Duku 69'; Dodds 89' (o.g.)	Report	Finch 5'; Kavanagh 65', 83'	Stadium: LNER Community Stadium

15 July 2022 Friendly	Braga	3–0	Middlesbrough	Lagos, Portugal
19:00 WEST	Medeiros 11'; Horta 48' (pen.), 50'	Report		Stadium: Estádio Municipal de Lagos

19 July 2022 Friendly	Morecambe	0–3	Middlesbrough	Morecambe
19:00 BST		Report	Tavernier 14'; Crooks 28'; McGree 42'	Stadium: Mazuma Stadium

20 July 2022 Friendly	Whitby Town	v	Middlesbrough	Whitby
19:30 BST				Stadium: Tower Express Stadium

22 July 2022 Friendly	Middlesbrough	2–0	Olympique de Marseille	Middlesbrough
19:00 BST	Jones 51'; Tavernier 70'	Report		Stadium: Riverside Stadium; Attendance: 14,000

26 November 2022 Friendly	Hibernian	0–2	Middlesbrough	Leith, Scotland
13:00 GMT		Report	Akpom 62'; Finch 66'	Stadium: Easter Road

== Competitions ==
=== Championship ===
==== League table ====
Pos	Team	Pld	W	D	L	GF	GA	GD	Pts	Promotion, qualification or relegation
1	Burnley (C, P)	46	29	14	3	87	35	+52	101	Promotion to Premier League
2	Sheffield United (P)	46	28	7	11	73	39	+34	91	Promotion to Premier League
3	Luton Town (O, P)	46	21	17	8	57	39	+18	80	Qualification for Championship play-offs
4	Middlesbrough	46	22	9	15	84	56	+28	75	Qualification for Championship play-offs
5	Coventry City	46	18	16	12	58	46	+12	70	Qualification for Championship play-offs
6	Sunderland	46	18	15	13	68	55	+13	69	Qualification for Championship play-offs
7	Blackburn Rovers	46	20	9	17	52	54	−2	69	

Source: EFL Official Website
Rules for classification: 1) Points; 2) Goal difference; 3) Number of goals scored; 4) Head-to-head results; 5) Wins; 6) Away goals; 7) Penalty points (sec 9.5); 8) 12-point sending off offences
(C) Champions; (O) Play-off winners; (P) Promoted

==== Results summary ====
Overall								Home						Away					
Pld	W	D	L	GF	GA	GD	Pts	W	D	L	GF	GA	GD	W	D	L	GF	GA	GD
46	22	9	15	84	56	+28	75	13	7	3	46	19	+27	9	2	12	38	37	+1

Source: Soccerway

==== Results by round ====
Round	1	2	3	4	5	6	7	8	9	10	11	12	13	14	15	16	17	18	19	20	21	22	23	24	25	26	27	28	29	30	31	32	33	34	35	36	37	38	39	40	41	42	43	44	45	46
Ground	H	A	H	A	A	H	A	H	H	H	A	H	A	H	A	H	A	A	H	A	A	H	A	H	A	A	H	A	H	H	A	A	H	A	H	A	H	H	A	H	A	H	H	A	A	H
Result	D	L	D	D	L	W	L	W	L	D	L	W	L	L	W	D	L	W	D	W	W	W	L	W	W	W	W	L	W	W	W	W	W	L	W	W	D	W	L	L	D	W	W	L	L	D
Position/	11	20	19	20	23	18	20	17	20	22	22	18	21	22	20	21	21	19	20	16	14	12	13	11	6	5	4	6	3	3	3	3	3	3	3	3	3	3	3	4	4	4	4	4	4	4

Source: Soccerway
A = Away; H = Home; W = Win; D = Draw; L = Loss; P = Postponed

==== Matches ====
Win Draw Loss Fixtures

On 23 June, the league fixtures were announced.

30 July 2022 1	Middlesbrough	1–1	West Bromwich Albion	Middlesbrough
17:30 BST	Jones 10'; Howson (yellow card) 40'; Bola (yellow card) 59'	Report	Swift 51', (yellow card) 61'	Stadium: Riverside Stadium; Attendance: 26,567; Referee: Tony Harrington
Note: Live on Sky Sports

6 August 2022 2	Queens Park Rangers	3–2	Middlesbrough	Shepherd's Bush
15:00 BST	Willock 13'; Dunne 27'; Dykes 38'; Johansen (yellow card) 77'; Kakay (yellow card) 90+1'	Report	Forss (yellow card) 17', (goal) 56'; Crooks 41'; Bola (yellow card) 73'; Lenihan (red card) 90+2'	Stadium: Loftus Road Stadium; Attendance: 15,796; Referee: Josh Smith

14 August 2022 3	Middlesbrough	2–2	Sheffield United	Middlesbrough
14:00 BST	McGree (yellow card) 11'; Akpom 14', 82'; Fry (yellow card) 45+1'	Report	Berge 2'; Sharp (yellow card) 11'; Norrington-Davies (yellow card) 19'; Giles 68' (o.g.); Fleck (yellow card) 90+1'	Stadium: Riverside Stadium; Attendance: 26,056; Referee: Andre Marriner

17 August 2022 4	Stoke City	2–2	Middlesbrough	Stoke-on-Trent
19:45 BST	Brown 19', (yellow card) 41'; Baker (yellow card) 51'; Wright-Phillips 90+1'	Report	Watmore 38'; Jagielka 63' (o.g.); Dijksteel (yellow card) 90+1'	Stadium: Bet365 Stadium; Attendance: 18,345; Referee: Michael Salisbury

20 August 2022 5	Reading	1–0	Middlesbrough	Reading
15:00 BST	Fornah 28'; Hoilett (yellow card) 41'; McIntyre (yellow card) 75'; Bouzanis (yellow card) 85'; Loum (yellow card) 90+2'	Report	Jones (yellow card) 22'	Stadium: Select Car Leasing Stadium; Attendance: 12,318; Referee: James Linington

27 August 2022 6	Middlesbrough	2–1	Swansea City	Middlesbrough
15:00 BST	McGree 14'; Mowatt (yellow card) 27'; Crooks 30', (yellow card) 45'; Lenihan (yellow card) 78'; Roberts (yellow card) 84'; Jones (yellow card) 87'	Report	Cabango (yellow card) 74' (yellow-red card) 88'; Piroe 79' (pen.); Wood (yellow card) 80'; Cooper (yellow card) 90+2'	Stadium: Riverside Stadium; Attendance: 23,672; Referee: Bobby Madley

30 August 2022 7	Watford	2–1	Middlesbrough	Watford
19:45 BST	Sarr 24'; Sierralta (yellow card) 61'; Choudhury (yellow card) 90+2'; Bayo 90+3'	Report	Muniz 4'; Crooks (yellow card) 38'; Jones (yellow card) 82'; McNair (yellow card) 87'; McGree (yellow card) 90+2'	Stadium: Vicarage Road; Attendance: 20,022; Referee: Chris Kavanagh

5 September 2022 8	Middlesbrough	1–0	Sunderland	Middlesbrough
20:00 BST	McGree 25'; McNair (yellow card) 38'; Clarke (yellow card) 40'; Crooks (yellow card) 72'; Jones (yellow card) 80'; Smith (yellow card) 90+2'	Report	Pritchard (yellow card) 41'	Stadium: Riverside Stadium; Attendance: 30,391; Referee: Darren Bond

13 September 2022 9	Middlesbrough	2–3	Cardiff City	Middlesbrough
19:45 BST	Watmore 76'; Muniz 77'; McGree (yellow card) 81'	Report	O'Dowda 4'; Harris 20'; Ng 45'; Wintle (yellow card) 85'	Stadium: Riverside Stadium; Attendance: 22,124; Referee: Darren Bond

17 September 2022 10	Middlesbrough	0–0	Rotherham United	Middlesbrough
19:45 BST	Howson (yellow card) 43'	Report	Humphreys (yellow card) 45+2'; Bramall (yellow card) 80'	Stadium: Riverside Stadium; Attendance: 22,960; Referee: Tim Robinson

1 October 2022 11	Coventry City	1–0	Middlesbrough	Coventry
15:00 BST	Gyökeres 17'; Dabo (yellow card) 49'; Palmer (yellow card) 56'; Bidwell (yellow card) 90+4'; Wilson (yellow card) 90+5'	Report	Jones (yellow card) 64'	Stadium: The Coventry Building Society Arena; Attendance: 19,788; Referee: Stephen Martin

5 October 2022 12	Middlesbrough	1–0	Birmingham City	Middlesbrough
19:45 BST	McNair (yellow card) 15'; Akpom 23'; Dijksteel (yellow card) 29'	Report	Bacuna (yellow card) 13'	Stadium: Riverside Stadium; Attendance: 22,374; Referee: Michael Salisbury

8 October 2022 13	Millwall	2–0	Middlesbrough	Bermondsey
15:00 BST	Flemming 5' 49'; Wallace (yellow card) 29'; Burey (yellow card) 42'	Report	McNair (yellow card) 42'; Jones (yellow card) 57'	Stadium: The Den; Attendance: 15,638; Referee: Matt Donohue

15 October 2022 14	Middlesbrough	1–2	Blackburn Rovers	Middlesbrough
15:00 BST	Muniz (yellow card) 27'; Watmore 45+1'; McNair (yellow card) 90+5'	Report	Lenihan 4' (o.g.); Gallagher 17'; Travis (yellow card) 27'; Morton (yellow card) 51'; Kaminski (yellow card) 77'; Dolan (yellow card) 90+5'	Stadium: Riverside Stadium; Attendance: 24,213; Referee: Darren Bond

19 October 2022 15	Wigan Athletic	1–4	Middlesbrough	Wigan
19:45 BST	Tilt (yellow card) 12'; Keane 34'	Report	Akpom (yellow card) 12' (goal) 69' (pen.); Jones 44'; Watmore 51'; Hackney 57'; Crooks (yellow card) 72'	Stadium: DW Stadium; Attendance: 10,226; Referee: Leigh Doughty

22 October 2022 16	Middlesbrough	0–0	Huddersfield Town	Middlesbrough
15:00 BST	Lenihan (yellow card) 52'; Muniz (yellow card) 67'; Howson (yellow card) 90+4'	Report	Camara (yellow card) 66'	Stadium: Riverside Stadium; Attendance: 23,661; Referee: Andy Davies

29 October 2022 17	Preston North End	2–1	Middlesbrough	Preston
15:00 BST	Whiteman (yellow card) 29'; Riis Jakobsen 35'; Lindsay (yellow card) 49'; Fernández (yellow card) 75'; Storey 90+1'	Report	Akpom 8' (yellow card) 90'; Hackney (yellow card) 24'; Howson (yellow card) 34'	Stadium: Deepdale; Attendance: 16,984; Referee: Gavin Ward

1 November 2022 18	Hull City	1–3	Middlesbrough	Kingston upon Hull
19:45 GMT	Christie 60'; Figueiredo (yellow card) 81'	Report	Hackney (yellow card) 5'; Smith (yellow card) 6'; Akpom 30'; Figueiredo 63' (o.g.); Christie 80' (o.g.); Jones (yellow card) 86'	Stadium: MKM Stadium; Attendance: 16,445; Referee: Dean Whitestone

5 November 2022 19	Middlesbrough	1–1	Bristol City	Middlesbrough
15:00 GMT	Giles (yellow card) 25'; Akpom 47'; McGree (yellow card) 74'; Smith (yellow card) 82'	Report	Weimann 10'; Low (yellow card) 89'; Vyner (yellow card) 90+1'	Stadium: Riverside Stadium; Attendance: 23,899; Referee: Matt Donohue

8 November 2022 20	Blackpool	0–3	Middlesbrough	Blackpool
19:45 GMT	Husband (yellow card) 7'; Thompson (yellow card) 34'; Maxwell (yellow card) 47'; Corbeanu (yellow card) 52'	Report	Jones 15'; Forss 48' (pen.); Akpom 65'; Hackney (yellow card) 90+4'	Stadium: Bloomfield Road; Attendance: 12,191; Referee: Jeremy Simpson

12 November 2022 21	Norwich City	1–2	Middlesbrough	Norwich
15:00 GMT	Sargent 7'; Hayden (yellow card) 59'	Report	Lenihan (yellow card) 22'; Forss (yellow card) 41'; McGree 64'; Crooks 90+2'	Stadium: Carrow Road; Attendance: 26,673; Referee: Leigh Doughty

10 December 2022 22	Middlesbrough	2–1	Luton Town	Middlesbrough
15:00 GMT	Akpom 38'; Crooks 90+1'	Report	Bell (yellow card) 25' (yellow-red card) 72'; Clark 33'; Lockyer (yellow card) 57'; Bree (yellow card) 72'	Stadium: Riverside Stadium; Attendance: 23,187; Referee: Gavin Ward

17 December 2022 23	Burnley	3–1	Middlesbrough	Burnley
15:00 GMT	Benson 60', 67'; Howson 72' (o.g.); Cork (yellow card) 75'; Roberts (red card) 89'	Report	Watmore 49'; Steffen (yellow card) 58'; Akpom (penalty missed) 90'; Lenihan (yellow card) 90+3'	Stadium: Turf Moor; Attendance: 20,603; Referee: David Webb

26 December 2022 24	Middlesbrough	4–1	Wigan Athletic	Middlesbrough
15:00 GMT	Forss 26'; Akpom 49', 59', 90+3'; Hackney (yellow card) 79'; Smith (yellow card) 80'	Report	Aasgaard 61'; Hughes (yellow card) 66'	Stadium: Riverside Stadium; Attendance: 31,048; Referee: Oliver Langford

29 December 2022 25	Blackburn Rovers	1–2	Middlesbrough	Blackburn
19:45 GMT	Hedges 5'; Buckley (red card) 50'; Hyam (yellow card) 90+4'	Report	Hackney (yellow card) 8'; Forss 46'; Crooks (yellow card) 49'; McGree 56'; Smith (yellow card) 81'	Stadium: Ewood Park; Attendance: 18,128; Referee: Leigh Doughty

2 January 2023 26	Birmingham City	1–3	Middlesbrough	Birmingham
15:00 GMT	Bielik (yellow card) 28'; Chong 74'	Report	Howson (yellow card) 15'; Crooks 57'; Crooks 59'; Smith (yellow card) 81'; Akpom 85'	Stadium: St Andrews; Attendance: 17,823; Referee: Dean Whitestone

14 January 2023 27	Middlesbrough	1–0	Millwall	Middlesbrough
15:00 GMT	Crooks (yellow card) 45+2'; Forss 54'; Howson (yellow card) 87'	Report	Long (yellow card) 39'; Wallace (yellow card) 47'; Saville (yellow card) 78'; Hutchinson (yellow card) 90'	Stadium: Riverside Stadium; Attendance: 24,614; Referee: Matt Donohue

22 January 2023 28	Sunderland	2–0	Middlesbrough	Sunderland
12:00 GMT	Stewart (penalty missed) 51', 51'; Diallo 81'	Report	Howson (yellow card) 16'; Fry (red card) 49'; Forss (yellow card) 50'	Stadium: Stadium of Light; Attendance: 42,584; Referee: James Linington

28 January 2023 29	Middlesbrough	2–0	Watford	Middlesbrough
15:00 GMT	Akpom 36'; Howson (yellow card) 44'; Forss 45+3'	Report	Cathcart (yellow card) 38'; Adeyemo (yellow card) 90+2'	Stadium: Riverside Stadium; Attendance: 25,469; Referee: Darren Bond

4 February 2023 30	Middlesbrough	3–0	Blackpool	Middlesbrough
15:00 GMT	Hackney (yellow card) 7'; Akpom 32', 59'; McNair 70'	Report	Yates (yellow card) 26'; Madine (yellow card) 79'	Stadium: Riverside Stadium; Attendance: 26,299; Referee: Tim Robinson

11 February 2023 31	Cardiff City	1–3	Middlesbrough	Cardiff
15:00 GMT	Kaba 25'	Report	Forss 17'; Archer 38' (yellow card) 78'; Lenihan (yellow card) 72'; McGree 90'	Stadium: Cardiff City Stadium; Attendance: 19,182; Referee: John Busby

15 February 2023 32	Sheffield United	1–3	Middlesbrough	Sheffield
20:00 GMT	McBurnie 5' (yellow card) 74'; Ahmedhodzic (yellow card) 63'; Bogle (yellow card) 86'	Report	Smith (yellow card) 14'; Akpom 25'; Archer 48', 74'; Howson (yellow card) 57'; Crooks (yellow card) 90+3'	Stadium: Bramall Lane; Attendance: 29,084; Referee: Andre Marriner

18 February 2023 33	Middlesbrough	3–1	Queens Park Rangers	Middlesbrough
15:00 GMT	Akpom 64', 77' (yellow card) 65'; McGree 90+2'	Report	Chair 89'	Stadium: Riverside Stadium; Attendance: 27,546; Referee: David Webb

25 February 2023 34	West Bromwich Albion	2–0	Middlesbrough	West Bromwich
15:00 GMT	Dike 8', 10'	Report	Smith (yellow card) 44'	Stadium: The Hawthorns; Attendance: 25,204; Referee: Darren Bond

4 March 2023 35	Middlesbrough	5–0	Reading	Middlesbrough
15:00 GMT	Akpom 24', 48' (pen.) (yellow card) 32'; Ramsey 45+1', 51'; Forss 76' (pen.)	Report	Ince (yellow card) 26'; Holmes (yellow card) 78'	Stadium: Riverside Stadium; Attendance: 26,823; Referee: Keith Stroud

11 March 2023 36	Swansea City	1–3	Middlesbrough	Swansea
15:00 GMT	Piroe 15'; Latibeaudiere (yellow card) 58'; Darling (yellow card) 73'; Fulton (yellow card) 82'	Report	Ramsey 54' (yellow card) 73'; Archer 57'; Akpom 77' (pen.)	Stadium: Swansea.com Stadium; Attendance: 17,021; Referee: Peter Bankes

14 March 2023 37	Middlesbrough	1–1	Stoke City	Middlesbrough
20:00 GMT	Akpom 23'; Forss (yellow card) 70'	Report	Brown (yellow card) 29'; Hoever 45'; Tuanzebe (yellow card) 58'; Pearson (yellow card) 75'; Campbell (yellow card) 90+2'	Stadium: Riverside Stadium; Attendance: 24,779; Referee: Craig Pawson

18 March 2023 38	Middlesbrough	4–0	Preston North End	Middlesbrough
15:00 GMT	Akpom 22'; Steffen (yellow card) 50'; Archer 52', 58'; Forss (yellow card) 76'; Fry (yellow card) 78'; Bola (yellow card) 90+4'; Forss 90+5'	Report	Hughes (yellow card) 45+2'; Fernández (yellow card) 67'; Diaby (yellow card) 76' (yellow-red card) 88'; Delap (yellow card) 90+4'	Stadium: Riverside Stadium; Attendance: 28,304; Referee: Matt Donohue

1 April 2023 39	Huddersfield Town	4–2	Middlesbrough	Huddersfield
15:00 GMT	Ruffels 46'; Rudoni (yellow card) 52'; Koroma 54', (yellow card) 80'; Pearson 57', 66'	Report	Forss 43'; Hackney (yellow card) 62'; Akpom 74'; Smith (yellow card) 80'	Stadium: John Smith's Stadium; Attendance: 20,186; Referee: John Busby

7 April 2023 40	Middlesbrough	1–2	Burnley	Middlesbrough
20:00 GMT	Hackney (yellow card) 38'; Akpom 47' (pen.)	Report	Barnes 12'; Roberts 66'; Obafemi (yellow card) 90+4'	Stadium: Riverside Stadium; Attendance: 30,844; Referee: Darren Bond

10 April 2023 41	Bristol City	2–2	Middlesbrough	Bristol
17:30 GMT	Vyner (yellow card) 22'; Bell 45+1'; Cornick 49'; Weimann (yellow card) 51'	Report	Ramsey 58'; Crooks 64'; Smith (yellow card) 86'	Stadium: Ashton Gate; Attendance: 21,726; Referee: Tim Robinson

14 April 2023 42	Middlesbrough	5–1	Norwich City	Middlesbrough
20:00 GMT	Ramsey 7'; Hackney 41'; Archer 43', 45+6'; Akpom 49'	Report	Sargent 45'; Sørensen (yellow card) 70'	Stadium: Riverside Stadium; Attendance: 26,429; Referee: Joshua Smith

19 April 2023 43	Middlesbrough	3–1	Hull City	Middlesbrough
19:45 GMT	Hackney 55'; Archer 58'; Akpom 61', (yellow card) 62'	Report	Sayyadmanesh 41'; Vaughan (yellow card) 64'	Stadium: Riverside Stadium; Attendance: 24,923; Referee: Andy Davies

24 April 2023 44	Luton Town	2–1	Middlesbrough	Luton
20:00 GMT	Lockyer 49'; Morris 67' (pen.); Berry (yellow card) 78'; Bell (yellow card) 90+1'	Report	Archer 40'	Stadium: Kenilworth Road; Attendance: 10,063; Referee: Graham Scott

1 May 2023 45	Rotherham United	1–0	Middlesbrough	Rotherham
15:00 GMT	Lindsay (yellow card) 29'; Odoffin 48', (yellow card) 69'; Bramall (yellow card) 79'	Report	Hackney (yellow card) 17'; Dijksteel (red card) 45+5'	Stadium: AESSEAL New York Stadium; Attendance: 11,508; Referee: Keith Stroud

8 May 2023 46	Middlesbrough	1–1	Coventry City	Middlesbrough
15:00 GMT	Archer 45+4'; Jones (yellow card) 83'		Hamer 22'; Kelly (yellow card) 26'; McFadzean (yellow card) 69'; Doyle (yellow card) 82'	Stadium: Riverside Stadium; Attendance: 32,187; Referee: John Busby

==== Play-offs ====
Middlesbrough finished 4th, in the regular season and were drawn against 5th place Coventry City

14 May 2023 Semi final - Leg 1	Coventry City	0–0	Middlesbrough	Coventry
12:00 GMT		Report	Akpom (yellow card) 79'	Stadium: Coventry Building Society Arena; Attendance: 28,874; Referee: Bobby Madley

17 May 2023 Semi final - Leg 2	Middlesbrough	0–1 (0–1 agg.)	Coventry City	Middlesbrough
20:00 GMT	Smith (yellow card) 16'; McNair (yellow card) 41'; Lenihan (yellow card) 69'; Jones (yellow card) 83'	Report	Doyle (yellow card) 3'; Hamer (yellow card) 45+3', (goal) 57'; McFadzean (yellow card) 61'; Gyökeres (yellow card) 77'; Wilson (yellow card) 86'	Stadium: Riverside Stadium; Attendance: 32,154; Referee: David Coote

=== FA Cup ===
Boro entered the FA Cup in the third round and were drawn at home to Brighton & Hove Albion.

7 January 2023 Third round	Middlesbrough	1–5	Brighton & Hove Albion	Middlesbrough
15:00 GMT	Akpom 13'; Giles (yellow card) 76'	Report	Groß 8'; Lallana 29'; Caicedo (yellow card) 55'; Mac Allister 58', 80'; Undav 88'	Stadium: Riverside Stadium; Attendance: 21,982; Referee: Simon Hooper

=== EFL Cup ===
Middlesbrough were drawn at home to Barnsley in the first round.

10 August 2022 First round	Middlesbrough	0–1	Barnsley	Middlesbrough
19:45 BST		Report	McCarthy (yellow card) 66'; Oduor (yellow card) 81'; Benson 90+3'	Stadium: Riverside Stadium; Attendance: 9,361; Referee: Ben Toner

== Awards and nominations ==
=== Championship Manager of the Month ===
Key

- Pos – Position in the table at the end of the month

Month	Manager	M	W	D	L	GF	GA	GD	Pts	Pos	Result	Ref.
November	(England) Michael Carrick	5	4	1	0	9	3	+6	13	14th	Nominated	
January	(England) Michael Carrick	4	3	0	1	6	3	+3	9	3rd	Nominated	
February	(England) Michael Carrick	5	4	0	1	12	5	+7	12	3rd	Nominated	
March	(England) Michael Carrick	4	3	1	0	13	2	+11	10	3rd	Won	

=== Championship Player of the Month ===
Month	Pos.	Player	Pld	G	A	CS	S	Result	Ref.
November	FW	(England) Chuba Akpom	5	3	2	–	–	Nominated	
December	FW	(England) Chuba Akpom	4	4	0	–	–	Won	
February	FW	(England) Chuba Akpom	5	5	0			Nominated	
March	FW	(England) Chuba Akpom	4	5	1	–	–	Nominated	

=== Championship Goal of the Month ===
Key

- Score – The score at the time of the goal. Middlesbrough's score listed first.

Month	Pos.	Player	Score	Final score	Opponent	Date	Result	Ref.
November	MF	(Australia) Riley McGree	1–1 (A)	2–1 (A)	Norwich City	12 November 2022	Nominated	
February	FW	(England) Chuba Akpom	1–0 (A)	3–0 (A)	Blackpool	4 February 2023	Nominated	

=== Yearly awards ===
==== English Football League Awards ====
Award	Manager or Player	Result	Ref.
EFL Championship Manager of the Season	(England) Michael Carrick	Nominated	
EFL Championship Player of the Season	(England) Chuba Akpom	Won	
EFL Championship Young Player of the Season	(Scotland) Hayden Hackney	Nominated	

==== Middlesbrough 2022/2023 Player of the Year Awards ====
Award	Player	Result	Ref.
Player of the Year	(England) Chuba Akpom	Won	
Players' Player of the Year	(England) Chuba Akpom	Won	
Young Player of the Year	(Scotland) Hayden Hackney	Won	
Goal of the Season	(Australia) Riley McGree (v Norwich City, 12 November 2022)	Won	
