= Josh Umerah =

English footballer (born 1997)

Joshua Umerah
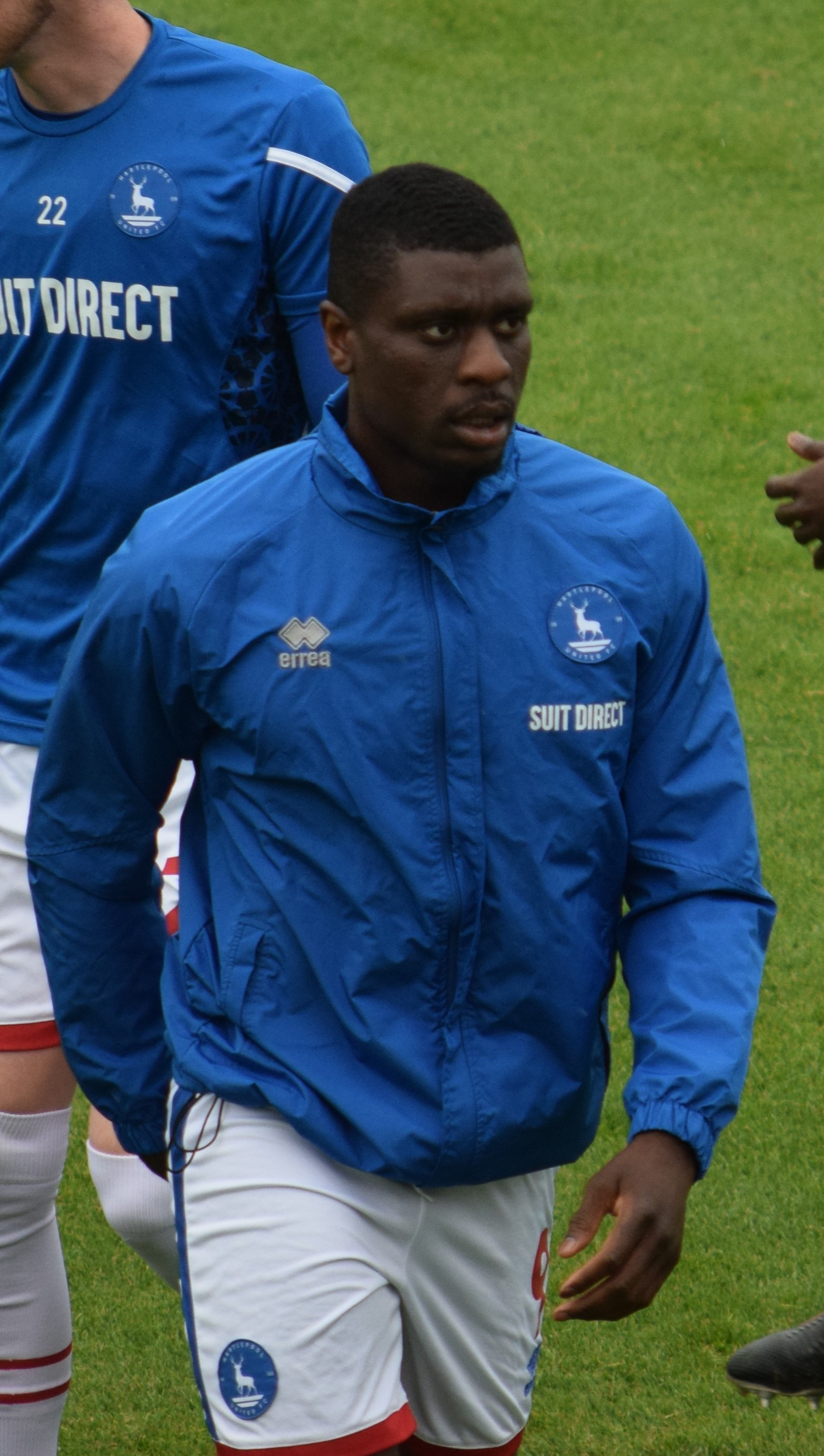
- Umerah warming up for Hartlepool United in 2022

Personal information
- Full name: Joshua Chukwudinma Umerah
- Date of birth: 8 March 1997 (age 29)
- Place of birth: Catford, England
- Height: 6 ft 1 in (1.86 m)
- Position: Forward

Team information
- Current team: Maidenhead United
- Number: 15

Youth career
- 2008–2015: Charlton Athletic

Senior career*
Years	Team	Apps	(Gls)
2015–2019	Charlton Athletic	2	(0)
2017	→ Kilmarnock (loan)	4	(0)
2017–2018	→ Wycombe Wanderers (loan)	6	(2)
2018–2019	→ Boreham Wood (loan)	20	(6)
2019–2020	Ebbsfleet United	30	(4)
2020–2021	Torquay United	27	(1)
2021–2022	Wealdstone	43	(17)
2022–2024	Hartlepool United	61	(14)
2024–2025	Dagenham & Redbridge	37	(8)
2025–	Maidenhead United	58	(21)
- * Club domestic league appearances and goals as of 17:52, 22 November 2026 (UTC)

Joshua Chukwudinma Umerah (born 8 March 1997) is an English professional footballer who plays as a forward for National League South club Maidenhead United.

Umerah began his career with Charlton Athletic, making his debut in 2016, and spent time on loan at Scottish club Kilmarnock, Wycombe Wanderers, Boreham Wood. He left Charlton in 2019, spending a season each at National League clubs Ebbsfleet United, Torquay United, and Wealdstone, before returning to the Football League with Hartlepool United in 2022. After two seasons with Hartlepool, he joined Dagenham & Redbridge.

== Career ==
=== Charlton Athletic ===
Umerah came through the Charlton Athletic academy, and helped the under-18 side to win the Professional Development League 2 after finishing as top-scorer during the 2014–15 season. He made his first team debut as a 66th-minute substitute for Igor Vetokele in a 6–0 defeat to Hull City in a Championship match at the KCOM Stadium on 16 January 2016. He signed an extended contract with the club in April 2016, to keep him at the club until June 2018.

==== Kilmarnock, Wycombe Wanderers, and Boreham Wood loans ====
Umerah moved on loan to Kilmarnock in January 2017. Umerah joined Wycombe Wanderers on 29 August 2017, for an initial loan running until January 2018, wearing the number 26 shirt for his time at Adams Park.

On 8 August 2018, Umerah signed on loan for Boreham Wood for the entire 2018–19 season.

=== Ebbsfleet and Torquay ===
On 23 July 2019, Umerah signed for Ebbsfleet United.

On 9 September 2020, Umerah signed for Torquay United. On 23 June 2021, he was released by the club.

=== Wealdstone ===
On 6 July 2021 Umerah signed for Wealdstone. On 21 August 2021, Umerah scored on his Wealdstone debut in a 2–1 defeat to Woking. He would go on to score 5 times in his first 7 appearances for the Stones, including a brace away at Notts County. On 12 February 2022, Umerah scored Wealdstone's second in an eventual 3–1 win against local rivals Barnet, taking his tally up to 10 for the season. He scored a total of 17 goals for Wealdstone.

=== Hartlepool United ===
On 14 July 2022 League Two side Hartlepool United announced the signing of Umerah from Wealdstone for an undisclosed fee. He was reported to have signed a two-year deal with the League Two club. In his fourth game, Umerah scored his first Hartlepool goal in a 2–1 defeat to Northampton Town. On 26 November, Umerah reached double digits for the season with a brace in a 3–1 win against Harrogate Town in a second round FA Cup fixture. Umerah won the League Two PFA fans' Player of the Month for January 2023. Umerah scored 15 goals in 47 matches in his first Hartlepool season although the club were relegated to the National League. In 2023–24, Umerah struggled for form in his second season with the club, scoring twice in 21 games, and lost his place in the starting line-up to Emmanuel Dieseruvwe. In March 2024, it was announced that he would be ruled out for the remainder of the season in order to undergo surgery. He was released by Hartlepool United at the end of the 2023–24 season. In his two seasons in the North East, he scored 17 goals in 68 appearances.

=== Dagenham & Redbridge ===
On 30 May 2024, it was confirmed that Umerah would sign for National League club Dagenham & Redbridge on a one-year deal with a one-year extension clause. Umerah scored eleven times in 44 appearances for the Daggers.

=== Maidenhead United ===
Umerah joined Maidenhead United for the 2025-26 season.

== Career statistics ==
As of 21 November 2026

Appearances and goals by club, season and competition
Club	Season	League			National Cup		League Cup		Other		Total	
Club	Season	Division	Apps	Goals	Apps	Goals	Apps	Goals	Apps	Goals	Apps	Goals
Charlton Athletic	2015–16	Championship	1	0	0	0	0	0	—		1	0
Charlton Athletic	2016–17	League One	1	0	0	0	0	0	1 (Note: Appearance(s) in EFL Trophy)	0	2	0
Charlton Athletic	2017–18	League One	0	0	0	0	0	0	0	0	0	0
Charlton Athletic	Total		2	0	0	0	0	0	1	0	3	0
Kilmarnock (loan)	2016–17	Scottish Premiership	4	0	—		—		—		4	0
Wycombe Wanderers (loan)	2017–18	League Two	6	2	—		—		1	0	7	2
Boreham Wood (loan)	2018–19	National League	20	6	3	1	—		1 (Note: Appearance in Scottish Challenge Cup)	0	24	7
Ebbsfleet United	2019–20	National League	30	4	3	0	—		3 (Note: Appearance(s) in FA Trophy)	0	36	4
Torquay United	2020–21	National League	27	1	2	2	—		3	2	32	5
Wealdstone	2021–22	National League	43	17	1	0	—		1	0	45	17
Hartlepool United	2022–23	League Two	41	12	4	3	1	0	1	0	47	15
Hartlepool United	2023–24	National League	20	2	1	0	—		0	0	21	2
Hartlepool United	Total		61	14	5	3	1	0	1	0	68	17
Dagenham & Redbridge	2024–25	National League	37	8	4	2	—		3 (Note: One appearance in FA Trophy, two appearances and one goal in National League Cup)	1	44	11
Maidenhead United	2025–26	National League South	41	16	0	0	—		2 (Note: One appearance in FA Trophy, one appearance in National League South playoffs)	0	43	16
Maidenhead United	2026–27	National League South	17	5	1	0	—		1	0	19	5
Maidenhead United	Total		58	21	1	0	0	0	3	0	62	21
Career total			288	73	19	8	1	0	17	3	325	84
