= Daniel Dodds =

English footballer (born 2001)

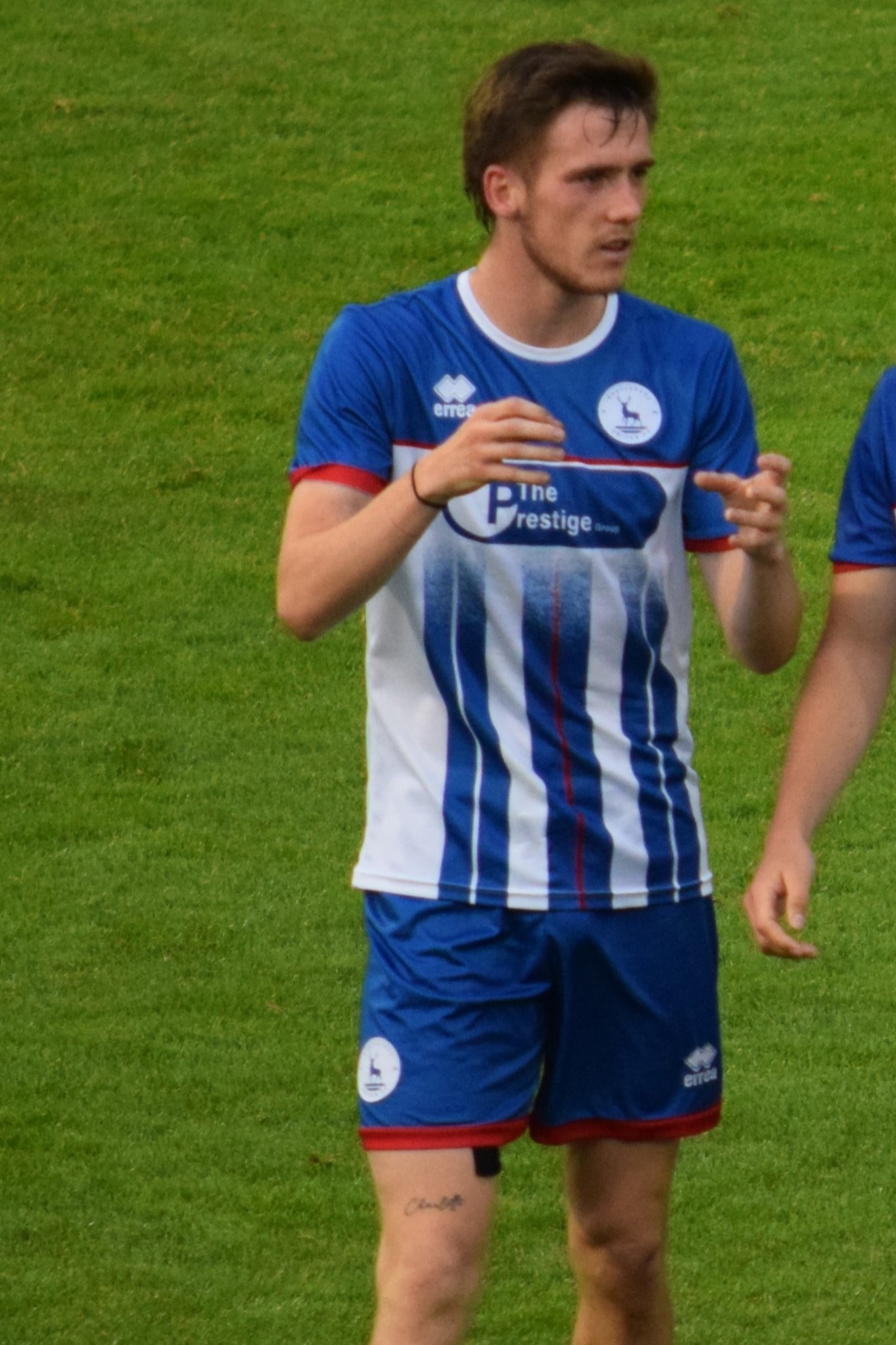
- Dodds playing for Hartlepool United in 2023

Personal information
- Full name: Daniel Mark Dodds
- Date of birth: 17 January 2001 (age 25)
- Place of birth: Northumberland, England
- Position: Defender

Team information
- Current team: South Shields

Youth career
- Newcastle United
- 2017–2022: Middlesbrough

Senior career*
Years	Team	Apps	(Gls)
2022–2023	Middlesbrough	0	(0)
2022–2023	→ Darlington (loan)	14	(1)
2023–2025	Hartlepool United	47	(2)
2025–	South Shields	44	(4)
- * Club domestic league appearances and goals as of 23:02, 9 May 2026 (UTC)

Daniel Mark Dodds (born 17 January 2001) is an English professional footballer who plays as a defender for National League North club South Shields.

He began his career with Middlesbrough, and spent time on loan at National League North club Darlington in the first half of the 2022–23 season, before joining Hartlepool United in January 2023.

== Life and career ==
Dodds was born in Northumberland in 2001. He played for East Northumberland under-13s in the English Schools' Football Association (ESFA) Trophy in 2013–14, and was on the books of Newcastle United as a youngster. He took up a scholarship with Middlesbrough in 2017, was a regular in the club's under-18 team throughout his first two years as well as appearing for the under-23s, and helped the under-18s reach the final of the 2018–19 Premier League Cup, in which they lost 1–0 to Manchester City.

Dodds made his debut in open-age football on 9 October 2018 when he started the 3–1 defeat away to Walsall in the EFL Trophy. When others of his group received professional contracts in 2019, he was offered a third scholarship year, but he did sign his first professional deal a year later. Although the club's strength at right back blocked his progress into the first team, he caught the eye of manager Neil Warnock, who said "I like Doddsy the right-back, I think he'll make a good living". He was a regular for the under-23s in 2020–21 – according to TeessideLive, he "has proven himself an exciting prospect with the ability to go both forward and defend adequately" – and the club took up its option to extend his contract.

After his 2021–22 season was disrupted by injury, Dodds signed a contract extension in June 2022. He and other academy products were used in pre-season friendlies and were included in the squad for the first-team's Portugal training camp, but manager Chris Wilder made it clear that he did not yet see them as "players who know how to win at the top end of the Championship." Dodds was one of several fringe players to make their senior debuts in Middlesbrough's EFL Cup first round defeat to Barnsley on 10 August 2022; he came on after 73 minutes and made "a couple of driving runs ... and one important late tackle".

Dodds joined National League North club Darlington on 30 September 2022 on loan until January 2023. He made his debut the next day, replacing the injured Kallum Griffiths at right back for the FA Cup third qualifying round match which Darlington lost 1–0 away to Hyde United. Dodds was a regular starter during his loan spell; he made 17 appearances in all competitions and scored his first senior goal, a "screamer from 25 yards (23 m)" in a 6–2 win away to Gloucester City on 10 December that took Darlington top of the table. Although Alun Armstrong wanted Dodds to stay for the rest of the season, Middlesbrough recalled him, amid speculation that he would go on loan to a team at Football League level.

On 11 January 2023, Dodds signed a permanent deal with League Two side Hartlepool United. On 4 February 2023, Dodds scored his first Hartlepool goal which was an 88th minute winner in a 1–0 win at Doncaster Rovers. He also scored the following week in a 2–2 home draw with Sutton United. Having impressed early in the 2023–24 season, Dodds sustained an injury to his ACL with the club expecting Dodds to be unavailable for a year. At the end of the season, Hartlepool took the option to extend Dodds' contract. His next match was the opening fixture of the 2024–25 season. He made 26 appearances during the season, but struggled with injury and form. It was reported that Dodds had been offered a new deal at the end of the season, however, he departed at the end of the season. He made 50 appearances during his time with Hartlepool, scoring twice.

On 16 June 2025, it was announced that he would sign for National League North club South Shields.

== Career statistics ==
As of match played 9 May 2026

Appearances and goals by club, season and competition
Club	Season	League			FA Cup		League Cup		Other		Total	
Club	Season	Division	Apps	Goals	Apps	Goals	Apps	Goals	Apps	Goals	Apps	Goals
Middlesbrough U23	2018–19	—			—		—		2 (Note: Appearances in EFL Trophy)	0	2	0
Middlesbrough	2022–23	Championship	0	0	0	0	1	0	—		1	0
Darlington (loan)	2022–23	National League North	14	1	1	0	—		2 (Note: Appearance(s) in FA Trophy)	0	17	1
Hartlepool United	2022–23	League Two	19	2	—		—		—		19	2
Hartlepool United	2023–24	National League	5	0	0	0	—		0	0	5	0
Hartlepool United	2024–25	National League	23	0	2	0	—		1	0	26	0
Hartlepool United	Total		47	2	2	0	—		1	0	50	2
South Shields	2025–26	National League North	44	4	3	1	—		3	0	50	5
Career total			105	7	6	1	1	0	8	0	120	8
