= Hayden Hackney =

English footballer (born 2002)

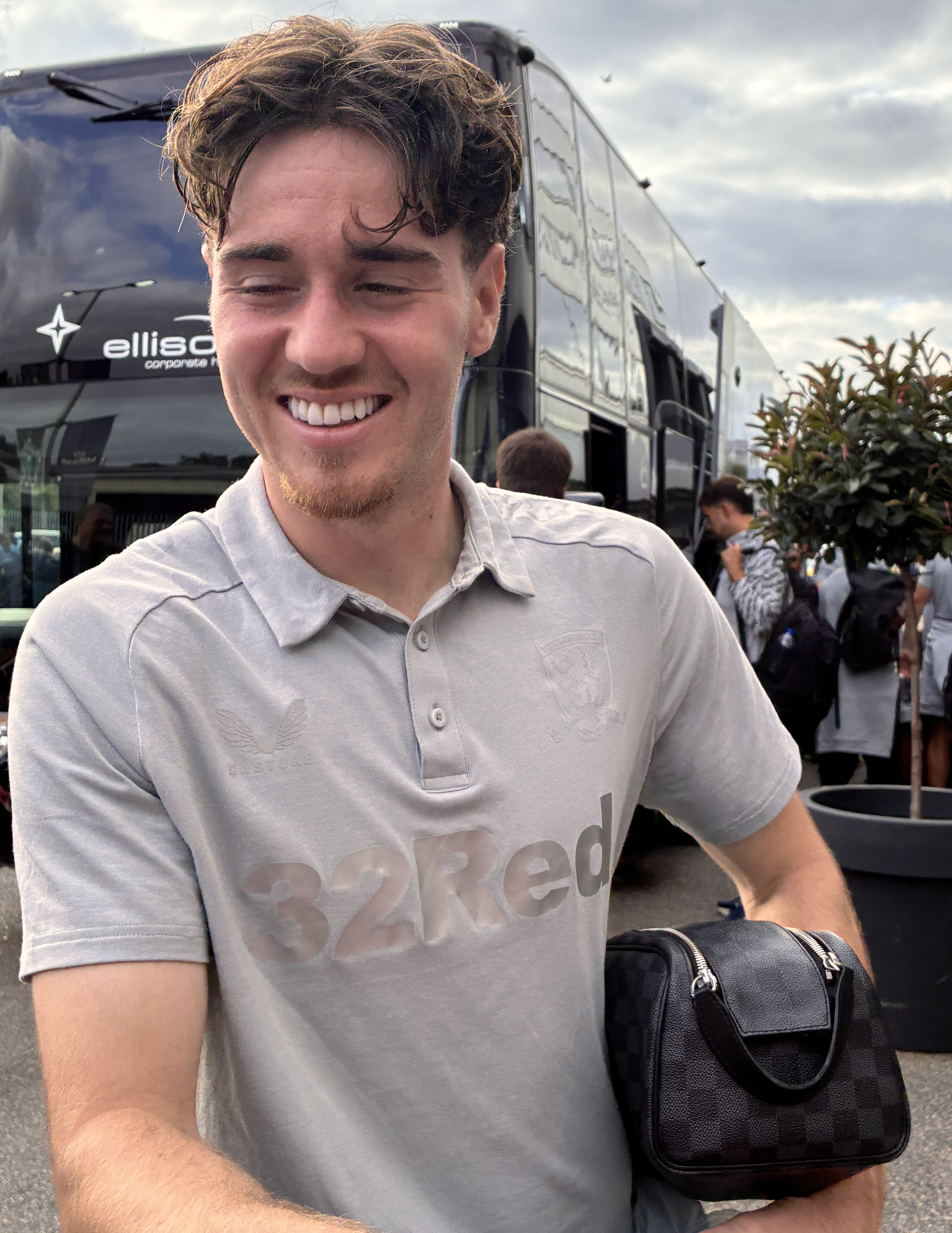
- Hackney in 2025

Personal information
- Full name: Hayden Rhys Hackney
- Date of birth: 26 June 2002 (age 24)
- Place of birth: Redcar, England
- Height: 5 ft 10 in (1.78 m)
- Position: Central midfielder

Team information
- Current team: Everton
- Number: 30

Youth career
- Redcar Town
- 2011–2021: Middlesbrough

Senior career*
Years	Team	Apps	(Gls)
2021–2026	Middlesbrough	137	(14)
2021–2022	→ Scunthorpe United (loan)	28	(1)
2026–	Everton	9	(0)

International career^{‡}
2016	England U15	2	(0)
2022	Scotland U21	2	(0)
2023–2025	England U21	13	(1)
Medal record
Men's football
Representing England
UEFA European Under-21 Championship
Winner	2025 Slovakia
- * Club domestic league appearances and goals as of 22:44, 6 November 2026 (UTC) ‡ National team caps and goals as of 18:35, 26 June 2025 (UTC)

Hayden Rhys Hackney (born 26 June 2002) is an English professional footballer who plays as a central midfielder for Premier League club Everton.

== Early life ==
Hackney was born in South Bank. He attended Sacred Heart Catholic Secondary School.

== Club career ==
=== Middlesbrough ===
Hackney joined Middlesbrough's academy after being spotted playing for his local side Redcar Town. Having been part of the Middlesbrough team that reached the under-18 Premier League Cup final in 2019, he signed his first professional contract with the club on 26 June 2019, his 17th birthday. Shortly after being named on the first-team bench for a match against Barnsley in November 2019, he was praised by Middlesbrough manager Jonathan Woodgate, with Woodgate claiming "Hayden Hackney deserves to be there because he's been outstanding for the Under-23s".

Hackney made his senior debut for Middlesbrough on 9 January 2021, starting in a 2–1 FA Cup defeat away to Brentford. He made his league debut for the club in the final match of the season as a substitute in a 3–0 defeat to Wycombe Wanderers. He signed a new two-year contract with the club later that month.

On 31 August 2021, Hackney joined EFL League Two side Scunthorpe United on loan until January 2022. After playing in the majority of games in the first half of the season, Hackney's loan was extended to last until the end of the season. In the 15th minute of a 2–0 defeat to Exeter City, Hackney was caught spitting at an opponent. The referee did not see this at the time, but after the game, The Football Association confirmed that Hackney had admitted to spitting and was given a six-game suspension. He made 31 appearances as Scunthorpe were relegated to the National League.

Hackney's game time at Middlesbrough was limited at the start of the 2022–23 season, but Hackney became a regular starter following the appointment of Michael Carrick as manager in October 2022. On 19 October, Hackney scored his first goal for Middlesbrough in a 4–1 win against Wigan Athletic. On 8 December, he signed a contract extension until 2026. Hackney won the Middlesbrough Young Player of the Year Award for the 2022–23 season, having made 38 appearances and scoring 3 goals. Hackney was also nominated for the Championship Young Player of the Season Award for the same season, but lost out to Bristol City's Alex Scott.

On 28 June 2023, Hackney signed a new contract for Middlesbrough, keeping him to the club until the summer of 2027. Hackney captained the club for the first time in a 1–0 home defeat to Aston Villa in the FA Cup on 6 January 2024. On 9 January, he scored the only goal in a 1–0 victory over Chelsea in the first leg of the EFL Cup semi-final.

=== Everton ===
On 2 July 2026, Premier League club Everton officially unveiled Hackney as their new signing for a reported fee of £16.5 million. On 22 August 2026, Hackney made his Premier League debut for the club, featuring in the starting XI, in a 2–0 win against Crystal Palace at the Hill Dickinson Stadium. Hackney scored his first goal for Everton in a 3–1 victory against Newcastle in the EFL Cup.

== International career ==
Hackney represented England at under-15 level. He is also eligible to represent Scotland because his mother was born in Edinburgh. He debuted for the Scotland under-21 team in November 2022.

In September 2023, Hackney was called up to the England under-21 squad for the first time. On 11 September 2023, he made his England U21 debut during a 3–0 2025 UEFA European Under-21 Championship qualification win away to Luxembourg. In March 2025 Hackney scored his only goal at international youth level in a 4–2 victory against Portugal at The Hawthorns.

Hackney was included in the England squad for the 2025 UEFA European Under-21 Championship. During the semi-final he provided the assist for the winning goal by Harvey Elliott against Netherlands. Hackney was an unused substitute in the final as England defeated Germany to win the tournament.

== Style of play ==
Hackney plays as a central midfielder. He often plays as a deep-lying playmaker due to his ability in possession of the ball.

== Career statistics ==
As of match played 29 October 2026

Appearances and goals by club, season and competition
Club	Season	League			FA Cup		EFL Cup		Other		Total	
Club	Season	Division	Apps	Goals	Apps	Goals	Apps	Goals	Apps	Goals	Apps	Goals
Middlesbrough	2020–21	Championship	1	0	1	0	0	0	—		2	0
Middlesbrough	2021–22	Championship	0	0	—		1	0	—		1	0
Middlesbrough	2022–23	Championship	34	3	1	0	1	0	2 (Note: Appearance(s) in EFL Championship play-offs)	0	38	3
Middlesbrough	2023–24	Championship	21	1	1	0	6	1	—		28	2
Middlesbrough	2024–25	Championship	43	5	1	0	0	0	—		44	5
Middlesbrough	2025–26	Championship	38	5	1	1	1	0	1	0	41	6
Middlesbrough	Total		137	14	5	1	9	1	3	0	154	16
Scunthorpe United (loan)	2021–22	League Two	28	0	1	0	—		2 (Note: Appearances in EFL Trophy)	0	31	0
Everton	2026–27	Premier League	7	0	0	0	2	1	―		9	1
Career total			172	14	6	1	11	2	5	0	194	17

== Honours ==
England U21

- UEFA European Under-21 Championship: 2025

Individual

- Middlesbrough Young Player of the Year: 2022–23
- EFL Championship Player of the Season: 2025–26
- EFL Championship Team of the Year: 2025–26
- PFA Team of the Year: 2025–26 Championship
- PFA Players' Player of the Year: 2025–26 Championship
