= Chuba Akpom =

English footballer (born 1995)

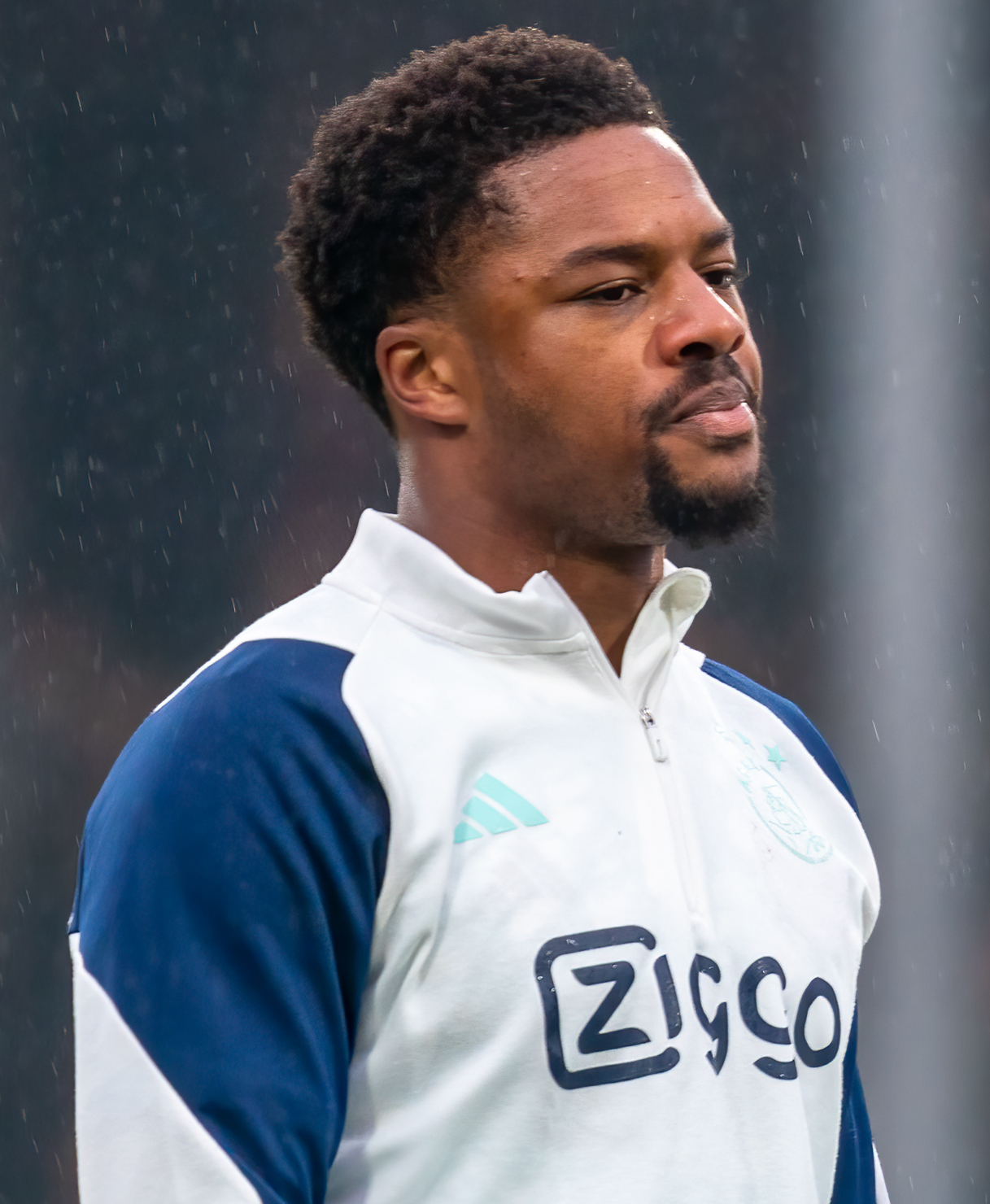
- Akpom with Ajax in 2024

Personal information
- Full name: Chuba Amechi Akpom
- Date of birth: 9 October 1995 (age 31)
- Place of birth: Newham, England
- Height: 6 ft 0 in (1.83 m)
- Position: Forward

Team information
- Current team: Ipswich Town
- Number: 29

Youth career
- 2002–2013: Arsenal

Senior career*
Years	Team	Apps	(Gls)
2013–2018	Arsenal	4	(0)
2013–2014	→ Brentford (loan)	4	(0)
2014	→ Coventry City (loan)	6	(0)
2015	→ Nottingham Forest (loan)	7	(0)
2015–2016	→ Hull City (loan)	36	(3)
2017	→ Brighton & Hove Albion (loan)	10	(0)
2018	→ Sint-Truiden (loan)	16	(6)
2018–2020	PAOK	54	(14)
2020–2023	Middlesbrough	77	(33)
2021–2022	→ PAOK (loan)	34	(7)
2023–2026	Ajax	42	(14)
2025	→ Lille (loan)	14	(3)
2025–2026	→ Ipswich Town (loan)	29	(2)
2026–	Ipswich Town	2	(1)

International career
2011	England U16	2	(0)
2011–2012	England U17	13	(5)
2012–2014	England U19	13	(6)
2014–2015	England U20	11	(6)
2015–2016	England U21	5	(3)
- * Club domestic league appearances and goals as of 18:30, 30 August 2026 (UTC)

Chuba Amechi Akpom (born 9 October 1995) is an English professional footballer who plays as a forward for Premier League club Ipswich Town.

A graduate of the Arsenal academy, Akpom made his senior debut in 2013 and featured in several domestic and European matches for the club. During his time at Arsenal, he was loaned to Brentford, Coventry City, Nottingham Forest, Hull City, Brighton & Hove Albion and Belgian side Sint-Truiden. He joined PAOK in 2018, scoring the winning goal in the 2019 Greek Cup Final as the club completed a domestic double. After a transfer to Middlesbrough in 2020 and a subsequent loan return to PAOK, he signed for Ajax in 2023 and joined Lille on loan the following year.

Born in London to Igbo Nigerian parents, Akpom is a dual national and has represented England at various youth levels. In 2019, he announced his intention to represent the Nigeria national team at senior level.

== Club career ==
=== Arsenal ===
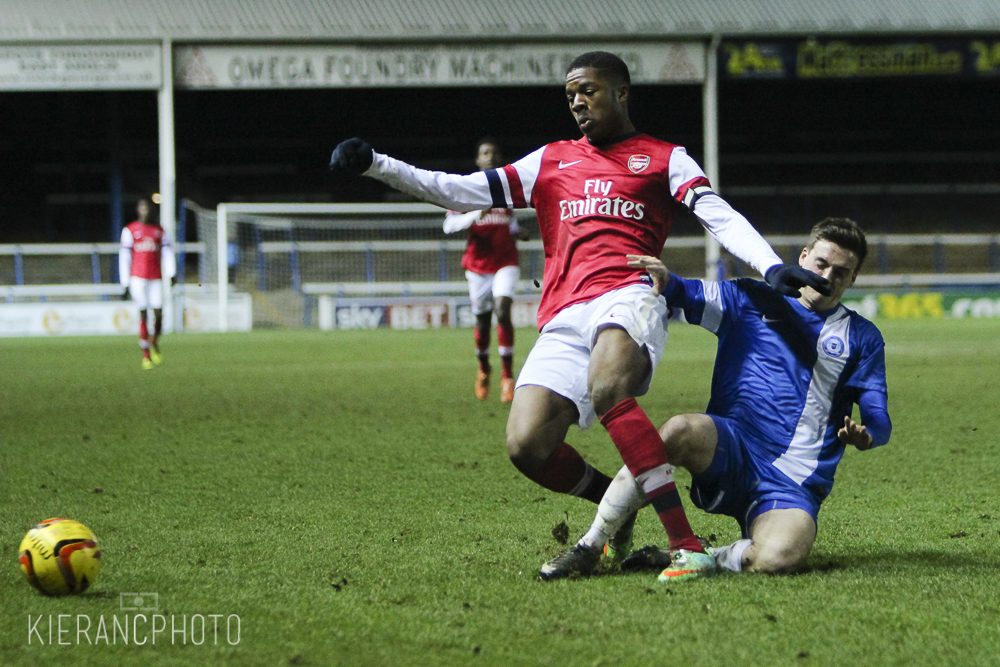
Chuba in action for Arsenal

Akpom joined Arsenal at the age of six. He made his debut for the Arsenal U18 side at the age of 15, and signed his first professional contract with Arsenal on 10 October 2012, a day after turning 17. In December 2012, Akpom received his first call into the Arsenal senior squad, when he was an unused substitute for a 2–1 Champions League defeat to Olympiakos. He made 20 U21 Premier League appearances during the 2012–13 season and scored 13 goals, including 10 goals in 10 games in the Elite Group stage. In the lead-up to the 2013–14 season, Akpom was selected for Arsenal's pre-season tour of Asia and scored once in a 7–0 win against an Indonesia Dream Team, two more in a 7–1 win against Vietnam and another in Arsenal's final game of the tour against Urawa Red Diamonds. Akpom made his competitive debut in a 3–1 Premier League win over Sunderland on 14 September 2013. He came on in the third minute of injury time as a substitute for the injured Olivier Giroud. Akpom's second Arsenal appearance came in a League Cup third round tie away to West Bromwich Albion on 25 September. He replaced goalscorer Thomas Eisfeld after 82 minutes and with the scores at 1–1 at full-time, the game entered extra time. Akpom played the full scoreless extra time period and scored Arsenal's third penalty in the ensuing shootout, helping Arsenal to a win. He scored three goals in four UEFA Youth League appearances towards the end of 2013. Akpom scored a hattrick in a 6–1 FA Youth Cup fourth round demolition of Peterborough United on 6 January 2014.

==== Brentford (loan) ====
On 30 December 2013, it was reported that League One sides Brentford, Peterborough United, Leyton Orient and Milton Keynes Dons were in a four-way battle to sign Akpom on loan. Brentford emerged as the favourites to land Akpom, due to the club's head of recruitment, Shaun O'Connor, having originally signed Akpom while working for Arsenal. The loan was thrown into doubt due to injuries suffered by Arsenal strikers Theo Walcott and Nicklas Bendtner in early January 2014, but was completed on 9 January, with Akpom signing for a month. Manager Mark Warburton said "Chuba is strong and quick, with a very good first touch. He's greedy and enjoys scoring goals. It's his first loan spell and League One is tough, so he might take some time to adapt. It's a big jump from Under 21 football".

He missed the first match of his loan through illness and Warburton stressed that Akpom would have to "work hard and earn his place like everyone else". Akpom made his debut in a 1–1 league draw at Walsall on 19 January. He came on for Will Grigg after 68 minutes and provided a cross for Clayton Donaldson in the dying moments, which went unconverted. After making four substitute appearances, his loan spell ended and he returned to Arsenal. Following the return to Arsenal, Akpom appeared on Arsenal Magazine about his time at Brentford for the March issue.

==== Coventry City (loan) ====
On 14 February 2014, Akpom joined League One side Coventry City on loan until the end of the 2013–14 season, with an agreement that he would rejoin the Arsenal squad for games in the FA Youth Cup and UEFA Youth League during the course of the loan. He made six appearances.

==== Return to Arsenal ====
Akpom began the 2014–15 season by scoring a hat trick for Arsenal in an Under-21 Premier League Division 2 game against West Bromwich Albion at the end of August. On 23 September 2014, he made his first senior appearance of the season, replacing Héctor Bellerín for the last four minutes as Arsenal lost 1–2 at home against Southampton in the League Cup. He made his first Premier League appearance of the season against Southampton on New Year's Day 2015. Akpom made a telling contribution to Arsenal's 5–0 home win against Aston Villa, coming on as a second-half substitute and winning a penalty, converted by Santi Cazorla, his first assist for the club. On 4 February 2015, Akpom spurned the interest of a number of other clubs from the Premier League and across Europe to sign a new 4 1/2-year contract with Arsenal.

==== Nottingham Forest (loan) ====
On 26 March 2015, he joined Championship club Nottingham Forest on loan till 31 May 2015. He made seven appearances.

==== Hull City (loan) ====
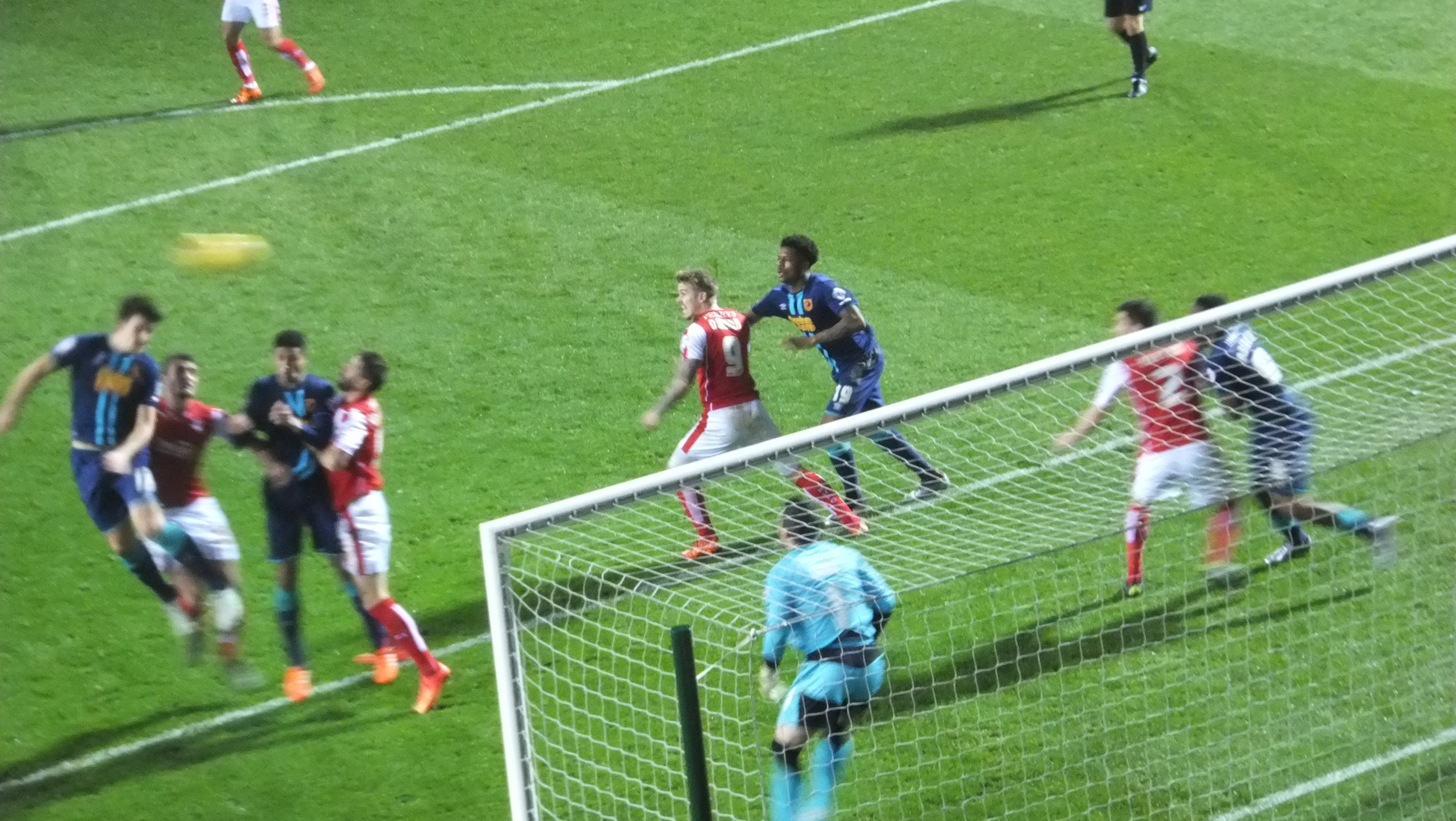
Akpom (wearing No.19) playing for Hull City on loan, 2015

On 4 August 2015, Akpom joined Championship side Hull City on a season-long loan. Akpom made his debut for the Yorkshire based club on the opening weekend of the 2015–16 season scoring the second goal in a 2–0 home win to Huddersfield Town on 8 August. Akpom made his second appearance from the bench replacing Nikica Jelavic in the 60th minute in the League Cup first round against Accrington Stanley. He scored in the 92nd minute in the first half of extra time and netted a penalty in a 4–3 shootout win for the Tigers. On 30 January 2016 Akpom scored his first senior hat-trick in the FA Cup match away to Bury that Hull won 3–1. He was an unused substitute in the 2016 Championship play-off final at Wembley as Hull beat Sheffield Wednesday to gain promotion to the Premier League.

==== Brighton (loan) ====
On 30 January 2017, Akpom joined Brighton & Hove Albion on loan until the end of the season. He made 10 appearances where he helped The Albion gain promotion to the Premier League.

==== Sint-Truiden (loan) ====
On 31 January 2018, Akpom joined Belgian First Division A side Sint-Truiden on loan until the end of the season. Akpom scored his first goal for the club in a 1–0 victory against Anderlecht on 17 February 2018.

=== PAOK ===
On 2 August 2018, Akpom joined Greek Super League Greece club PAOK on a three-year deal, for £900,000. On 25 August, he made his debut with the club as a substitute in a 1–0 home win game against Asteras Tripolis. On 11 November, he scored his first goal in a 2–1 home league win game against Panetolikos. In March 2019 the BBC said that Akpom was a key player in PAOK's title push. He was an unused substitute on 21 April 2019 when PAOK beat already relegated Levadiakos to confirm their first Super League title in 34 years.

He scored the only goal in PAOK's 2019 Greek Cup final win against AEK Athens.

On 6 August 2019, he scored against Ajax in the first leg of their UEFA Champions League third qualifying round tie that ended as a 2–2 draw. He scored his first goal of the 2019–20 Super League Greece in a 2–1 home win against Panionios on 1 September. On 1 March 2020, receiving a great pass from Omar El Kaddouri inside the penalty area, Akpom cut to a shooting position, subsequently whipping an excellent effort beyond the opposing goalkeeper, to open the score in a frustrating 1–1 away draw against Xanthi It was his 7th goal for Super League in the most productive year in his career so far.

=== Middlesbrough ===
On 19 September 2020, Akpom signed for English club Middlesbrough for a fee of £2.75m. The former Arsenal youngster joined from PAOK, where he had made a huge impression in the Super League Greece. Akpom signed a three-year contract, with the option of a further year. He scored on his Middlesbrough debut, a 1–1 draw with QPR on 26 September.

On 26 August 2021, PAOK announced the return of Akpom on loan from Middlesbrough until the end of the 2021–22 season.

Upon returning to Middlesbrough, Akpom was informed by, then manager, Chris Wilder that he would train with the Under-21s squad. He was assigned shirt number 29. On 14 August 2022, Akpom was brought back into the match-day squad and scored both goals in a 2–2 draw with Sheffield United.

Chuba continued his fine run of form on Boxing Day 2022 when he netted his first hat-trick for the club in a 4–1 win over Wigan Athletic at the Riverside Stadium. On 5 January 2023, head coach Michael Carrick announced that the club had exercised a twelve-month contract extension with Akpom having scored thirteen goals in twenty matches.

On 4 March 2023, Akpom scored 2 goals in a 5–0 home win against Reading, in the process becoming the first Middlesbrough player to score 20 league goals in a season since Bernie Slaven in 1990. On 19 April 2023 he scored in a 3–1 home win over Hull City, becoming the first player to score in nine successive home games in the second tier of English football. In an interview following the game, Akpom described head coach Michael Carrick as "the manager I've been dreaming of my whole career".

By the end of the season, Akpom was the EFL Championship's top scorer with 28 goals in 40 league appearances. He also won Player of the Year and Players' Player of the Year awards.

=== Ajax ===
On 16 August 2023, Akpom signed for Dutch Eredivisie club Ajax on a five-year contract set to expire in June 2028. He was signed for a transfer fee of €12.3m, potentially rising to €14.3m with add-ons. He made his debut on 3 September 2023 in a 0–0 draw away at Fortuna Sittard. He scored his first goal for the club in a 2–0 win over Volendam on 2 November 2023.

==== Lille (loan) ====
On 2 February 2025, Akpom moved on loan to Lille in France, with an option to buy. He scored his first goal for the club on Saturday 8 February at home to Le Havre after coming on as a substitute in the 45th minute.

=== Ipswich Town ===
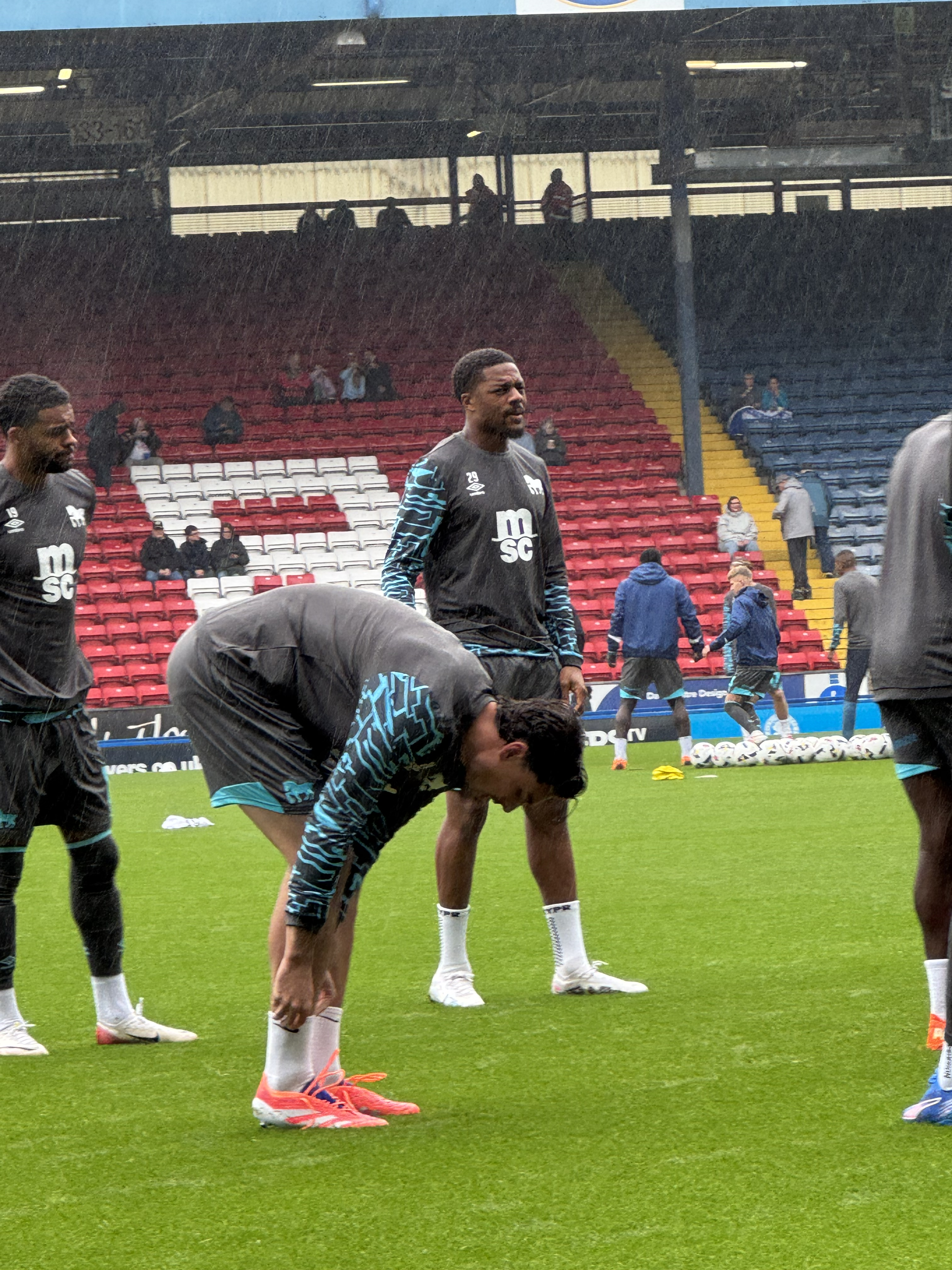
Akpom (number 29) with Ipswich in 2025

On 11 August 2025, Akpom joined EFL Championship club Ipswich Town on a season-long loan. On 5 May 2026, he completed a permanent move to the club, signing a contract that runs until 2029 after helping them secure promotion to the Premier League.

== International career ==
On 15 February 2011, Akpom made his debut for England U16s in a friendly match against Slovenia, which ended in a 0–0 draw. He second and final game for the U16s came in a 3–0 2010/11 Victory Shield win over Northern Ireland on 23 March 2011. On 2 August 2011, Akpom made his U17 debut, scoring once in 4–0 win over the Faroe Islands. He played in all six games and scored two goals during England's unsuccessful 2012 European U17 Championship qualifying campaign. He made 13 appearances in total for the U17s, and scored five goals. On 6 September 2012, Akpom made his England U19 debut in a 3–1 defeat to Germany. He scored his first goal for the U19s on 26 September 2012, in a 3–0 2013 European U19 Championship qualifying win over Estonia. Two days later, he scored two goals in a 6–0 win over the Faroe Islands. He played in five of England's six 2013 European U19 Championship qualifying and elite stage games and scored three goals, as England failed to qualify for the finals.

On 11 October 2014, Akpom scored his first goals for England U20 coming on as an 87th-minute substitute to score a brace against Netherlands U20 in a 3–2 victory. On 13 October 2015, Akpom made his England U21 debut playing 90 minutes and scoring with the last kick of the match in a European qualifying win over Kazakhstan. He scored again for the England U21 team in a UEFA Euro Under-21 Qualifier against Switzerland. England U21 won the match 3–1, with Akpom scoring in the injury time of the second half.

Akpom, who is of Nigerian descent, is still eligible to represent Nigeria. In May 2016, it was reported that he was one of three players formally approached by the Nigeria Football Federation.

Akpom was selected for the England under-21s for the UEFA European Championship qualifier against Norway on Tuesday 6 September 2016.

On 28 March 2017, Akpom was reportedly close to switching to Nigeria alongside Ola Aina of Chelsea after discussions with Nigeria Football Federation president, Amaju Pinnick.

In September 2019, he confirmed that he intended to represent Nigeria at international level. In an interview with BBC Sport, he stated: "It was a personal decision. I'm Nigerian, and my whole family feel very Nigerian and it will be nice to represent Nigeria."

== Career statistics ==
As of match played 15 September 2026

Appearances and goals by club, season and competition
Club	Season	League			National cup (Note: Includes FA Cup, Greek Football Cup, KNVB Cup, Coupe de France)		League cup (Note: Includes Football League/EFL Cup)		Europe		Other		Total	
Club	Season	Division	Apps	Goals	Apps	Goals	Apps	Goals	Apps	Goals	Apps	Goals	Apps	Goals
Arsenal	2012–13	Premier League	0	0	0	0	0	0	0	0	—		0	0
Arsenal	2013–14	Premier League	1	0	0	0	1	0	0	0	—		2	0
Arsenal	2014–15	Premier League	3	0	3	0	1	0	0	0	0	0	7	0
Arsenal	2016–17	Premier League	0	0	0	0	1	0	0	0	—		1	0
Arsenal	2017–18	Premier League	0	0	1	0	1	0	0	0	0	0	2	0
Arsenal	Total		4	0	4	0	4	0	0	0	0	0	12	0
Brentford (loan)	2013–14	League One	4	0	—		—		—		—		4	0
Coventry City (loan)	2013–14	League One	6	0	—		—		—		—		6	0
Nottingham Forest (loan)	2014–15	Championship	7	0	—		—		—		—		7	0
Hull City (loan)	2015–16	Championship	36	3	1	3	4	1	—		1 (Note: Appearance(s) in Championship play-offs)	0	42	7
Brighton & Hove Albion (loan)	2016–17	Championship	10	0	—		—		—		—		10	0
Sint-Truiden (loan)	2017–18	Belgian Pro League	16	6	—		—		—		—		16	6
PAOK	2018–19	Super League Greece	20	6	8	2	—		5 (Note: Two appearances in UEFA Champions League, three appearances in UEFA Europa League)	0	—		33	8
PAOK	2019–20	Super League Greece	33	8	6	1	—		4 (Note: Two appearances and one goal in UEFA Champions League, two appearances in UEFA Europa League)	1	—		43	10
PAOK	2020–21	Super League Greece	1	0	—		—		2 (Note: Appearance(s) in UEFA Champions League)	0	—		3	0
PAOK	Total		54	14	14	3	—		11	1	—		79	18
Middlesbrough	2020–21	Championship	38	5	1	0	—		—		—		39	5
Middlesbrough	2021–22	Championship	1	0	—		0	0	—		—		1	0
Middlesbrough	2022–23	Championship	38	28	1	1	1	0	—		2	0	42	29
Middlesbrough	Total		77	33	2	1	1	0	—		2	0	82	34
PAOK (loan)	2021–22	Super League Greece	34	7	7	2	—		11 (Note: Appearances in UEFA Europa Conference League)	2	—		52	11
Ajax	2023–24	Eredivisie	26	11	1	1	—		12 (Note: Six appearances and three goals in UEFA Europa League, four appearances in UEFA Europa Conference League)	3	—		39	15
Ajax	2024–25	Eredivisie	16	3	2	1	—		14 (Note: Appearances in UEFA Europa League)	4	—		32	8
Ajax	Total		42	14	3	2	—		26	7	—		71	23
Lille (loan)	2024–25	Ligue 1	14	3	1	0	—		1	0	—		16	3
Ipswich Town (loan)	2025–26	Championship	29	2	2	0	0	0	—		—		31	2
Ipswich Town	2026–27	Premier League	2	1	0	0	2	1	—		—		4	2
Career total			335	83	34	11	11	2	49	10	3	0	432	106

== Honours ==
Hull City

- Football League Championship play-offs: 2016

Brighton & Hove Albion

- EFL Championship runner-up: 2016–17

PAOK

- Super League Greece: 2018–19
- Greek Cup: 2018–19; runner-up: 2021–22

Ipswich Town

- EFL Championship runner-up: 2025–26

Individual

- PFA Championship Player's Player of the Year: 2022–23
- EFL Championship Player of the Season: 2022–23
- EFL Championship Team of the Season: 2022–23
- PFA Team of the Year: 2022–23 Championship
- EFL Championship Golden Boot: 2022–23
- EFL Championship Player of the Month: December 2022
- Middlesbrough Player of the Year: 2022–23
- Middlesbrough Players' Player of the Year: 2022–23
