= Tayt Trusty =

English footballer

Personal information
- Full name: Tayt-Lemar Trusty
- Date of birth: 23 November 2003 (age 22)
- Position: Midfielder

Team information
- Current team: FC Halifax Town

Youth career
- Blackpool

Senior career*
Years	Team	Apps	(Gls)
2021–2024	Blackpool	0	(0)
2022	→ Radcliffe (loan)	4	(0)
2022	→ Hyde United (loan)	5	(1)
2023	→ Hartlepool United (loan)	4	(0)
2024–2025	Maidstone United	31	(0)
2025–2026	Eastbourne Borough	46	(0)
2026–	FC Halifax Town	0	(0)
- * Club domestic league appearances and goals as of 23:33, 25 April 2026 (UTC)

Tayt-Lemar Trusty (born 23 November 2003) is an English professional footballer who plays as a midfielder for National League club FC Halifax Town.

== Club career ==
After playing for Blackpool, turning professional in January 2022, and after spending loan spells in non-league with Radcliffe, and Hyde United, Trusty moved on loan to Hartlepool United in January 2023. Following his loan spell, he was given a new 12-month contract by Blackpool.

On 13 September 2024, Trusty joined National League South club Maidstone United.

On 17 June 2025, Trusty joined National League South club Eastbourne Borough.

On 1 July 2026, Trusty joined National League club FC Halifax Town.

== International career ==
In November 2022 he joined the Cyprus under-21 team for training.

== Career statistics ==
As of match played 25 April 2026

Appearances and goals by club, season and competition
Club	Season	League			FA Cup		League Cup		Other		Total	
Club	Season	Division	Apps	Goals	Apps	Goals	Apps	Goals	Apps	Goals	Apps	Goals
Blackpool	2021–22	Championship	0	0	0	0	0	0	0	0	0	0
Blackpool	2022–23	Championship	0	0	0	0	0	0	0	0	0	0
Blackpool	2023–24	League One	0	0	0	0	0	0	1 (Note: Appearance(s) in EFL Trophy.)	0	1	0
Blackpool	Total		0	0	0	0	0	0	1	0	1	0
Radcliffe (loan)	2021–22	Northern Premier League	4	0	0	0	0	0	0	0	4	0
Hyde United (loan)	2022–23	Northern Premier League	5	1	0	0	0	0	0	0	5	1
Hartlepool United (loan)	2022–23	League Two	4	0	0	0	0	0	0	0	4	0
Maidstone United	2024–25	National League South	31	0	1	0	0	0	1 (Note: Appearance(s) in National League South Play-offs.)	0	33	0
Eastbourne Borough	2025–26	National League South	46	0	3	0	0	0	4 (Note: One appearance in FA Trophy, three appearances in Sussex Senior Cup)	0	53	0
Career total			90	1	4	0	0	0	6	0	100	1
