= 2024–25 Middlesbrough F.C. season =

149th season in existence of Middlesbrough FC

Middlesbrough
2024–25 season
- Chairman: Steve Gibson
- Head Coach: Michael Carrick
- Stadium: Riverside Stadium
- Championship: 10th
- FA Cup: Third round
- EFL Cup: Second round
- Top goalscorer: League: Tommy Conway (12); All: Tommy Conway (12)
- Highest home attendance: 32,147 v Sheffield Wednesday (26 December 2024, Championship)
- Lowest home attendance: 16,794 v Blackburn Rovers (11 January 2025, FA Cup)
- Average home league attendance: 25,330
- Biggest win: 5-1 v Luton Town (H) (9 November 2024, Championship) 2-6 v Oxford United (A) (23 November 2024, Championship)
- Biggest defeat: 0-5 v Stoke City (H) (27 August 2024, EFL Cup)
Home colours	Away colours

The 2024–25 season is the 149th season in the history of Middlesbrough Football Club and their eighth consecutive season in the Championship. In addition to the domestic league, the club were also participating in the FA Cup and the EFL Cup before being knocked out by Stoke City and Blackburn Rovers respectively. After the season amid missing out on the promotion playoffs, head coach Michael Carrick was let go of the club.

== Transfers ==
=== In ===
Date	Pos.	Player	From	Fee	Ref.
14 June 2024	LW	(Netherlands) Delano Burgzorg	(Germany) Mainz 05	Undisclosed	
28 June 2024	CM	(United States) Aidan Morris	(United States) Columbus Crew	Undisclosed	
1 July 2024 (Note: The transfer was announced on 27 May, and would become official on July 1 once his Leeds United contract expired)	RB	(England) Luke Ayling	(England) Leeds United	Free	
8 July 2024	CB	(England) Harley Hunt (Note: Signed initially for Under-21s)	(England) Swindon Town	Undisclosed	
9 August 2024	LW	(England) Micah Hamilton	(England) Manchester City	Undisclosed	
16 August 2024	CF	(Scotland) Tommy Conway	(England) Bristol City	Undisclosed	
27 August 2024	LB	(Brazil) Neto Borges	(France) Clermont Foot	Undisclosed	
23 January 2025	CM	(England) Brayden Johnson	(England) Eastbourne Borough	Undisclosed	
24 January 2025	RW	(England) Morgan Whittaker	(England) Plymouth Argyle	Undisclosed	
25 January 2025	CB	(England) George Edmundson	(England) Ipswich Town	Undisclosed	
31 January 2025	RW	(Scotland) Josh Dede	(Scotland) Celtic	Undisclosed	

=== Out ===
Date	Pos.	Player	To	Fee	Ref.
27 June 2024	LB	(England) Hayden Coulson	(England) Blackpool	Undisclosed	
28 June 2024	LB	(England) Bryant Bilongo	(England) Bristol Rovers	Undisclosed	
30 August 2024	CM	(England) AJ Bridge	(England) Norwich City	Undisclosed	
10 January 2025	RW	(Guyana) Isaiah Jones	(England) Luton Town	Undisclosed	
28 January 2025	CB	(England) Matthew Clarke	(England) Derby County	Undisclosed	
30 January 2025	CF	(England) Ajay Matthews	(England) Millwall	Undisclosed	
4 February 2025	CF	(Ivory Coast) Emmanuel Latte Lath	(United States) Atlanta United	$22,000,000	

=== Loaned in ===
Date	Pos.	Player	From	Date until	Ref.
30 August 2024	RW	(Scotland) Ben Doak	(England) Liverpool	End of Season	
30 August 2024	CB	(England) George Edmundson	(England) Ipswich Town	21 January 2025 (Note: On 21 January, Edmundson was recalled to his parent club Ipswich)	
23 January 2025	LB	(England) Ryan Giles	(England) Hull City	End of Season	
29 January 2025	GK	(Republic of Ireland) Mark Travers	(England) Bournemouth	End of Season	
3 February 2025	CF	(Nigeria) Kelechi Iheanacho	(Spain) Sevilla	End of Season	
3 February 2025	LW	(England) Samuel Iling-Junior	(England) Aston Villa	End of Season	

=== Loaned out ===
Date	Pos.	Player	To	Date until	Ref.
1 July 2024 (Note: The loan was announced on 26 June, and would officially commence on July 1)	RB	(England) Terrell Agyemang	(Scotland) Airdrieonians	2 January 2025 (Note: On 2 January, Agyemang was recalled from his loan at Airdrieonians)	
1 July 2024	LW	(Australia) Samuel Silvera	(England) Portsmouth	13 January 2025 (Note: On 13 January, Silvera was recalled from his loan at Portsmouth and subsequently loaned out to Blackpool)	
23 July 2024	GK	(England) Zach Hemming	(England) Leyton Orient	1 January 2025 (Note: On 1 January, Hemming was recalled from his loan at Leyton Orient)	
7 August 2024	CB	(England) Jack Hannah	(Scotland) Queen of the South	End of Season	
30 August 2024	CF	(England) Josh Coburn	(England) Millwall	End of Season	
30 August 2024	CF	(England) Sonny Finch	(England) Milton Keynes Dons	2 January 2025 (Note: On 2 January, Finch was recalled from his loan at Milton Keynes Dons)	
30 August 2024	LW	(England) Pharrell Willis	(Scotland) Queen of the South	16 January 2025 (Note: On 16 January, Willis was recalled from his loan at Queen of the South)	
20 December 2024	CM	(England) Hazeem Bakre	(England) Dagenham & Redbridge	18 January 2025	
3 January 2025	GK	(England) Zach Hemming	(Scotland) St Mirren	End of Season	
13 January 2025	LW	(Australia) Samuel Silvera	(England) Blackpool	End of Season	
23 January 2025	LW	(England) Micah Hamilton	(England) Stockport County	End of Season	
24 January 2025	RB	(Germany) George Gitau	(Scotland) Raith Rovers	End of Season	
3 February 2025	AM	(Republic of Ireland) Alex Gilbert	(England) Charlton Athletic	End of Season	
7 February 2025	CF	(England) Hazeem Bakre	(England) Darlington	End of Season	
11 February 2025	LB	(Denmark) Lukas Engel	(United States) FC Cincinnati	31 December 2025	
3 March 2025	RB	(England) Nathan Simpson	(England) Spennymoor Town	31 March 2025	
27 March 2025	CM	(England) Brayden Johnson	(England) Gateshead	End of Season	
28 March 2025	CF	(England) Daniel Nkrumah	(England) FC Halifax Town	End of Season	
28 March 2025	LW	(England) Pharrell Willis	(England) Maidstone United	End of Season	
21 April 2025	GK	(England) Shea Connor	(England) Darlington	28 April 2025	

=== Released / Out of Contract ===
Date	Pos.	Player	Subsequent club	Join date	Ref.
30 June 2024	CB	(England) Ben Beals	(England) Spennymoor Town	1 July 2024	
30 June 2024	LB	(England) Sam Collins	(England) Whitby Town	1 July 2024	
30 June 2024	AM	(England) Fenton John	(England) Gateshead	1 July 2024	
30 June 2024	GK	(Scotland) Max Metcalfe	(England) Stockport County	1 July 2024	
30 June 2024	RM	(England) Jeremy Sivi	(England) Sutton United	1 July 2024	
30 June 2024	CB	(England) Frankie Whelan	(England) Whitby Town	1 July 2024	
30 June 2024	GK	(England) Jamie Jones	(England) Salford City	18 July 2024	
30 June 2024	GK	(England) Liam Roberts	(England) Millwall	22 July 2024	
30 June 2024	CB	(Northern Ireland) Paddy McNair	(United States) San Diego	25 July 2024	
30 June 2024	RM	(England) Joe Gibson			
30 June 2024	GK	(England) Henry Popple			
9 January 2025	CF	(United States) Matthew Hoppe	(Denmark) Sønderjyske	31 January 2025	
5 February 2025	RB	(England) Tommy Smith	Retired		

== Pre-season and friendlies ==
On 7 June, Boro announced their pre-season schedule, with matches against Bolton Wanderers, Gateshead, Doncaster Rovers, Harrogate Town and Heerenveen.

Win Draw Loss Fixtures

20 July 2024 Friendly	Middlesbrough	3–0	Bolton Wanderers	Bishop Auckland
15:00 BST	Latte Lath 65'; Finch 75'; Burgzorg 86'	Report		Stadium: Heritage Park

24 July 2024 Friendly	Gateshead	0–1	Middlesbrough	Gateshead
19:30 BST		Report	Lenihan 30'	Stadium: Gateshead International Stadium; Attendance: 1,319

27 July 2024 Friendly	Doncaster Rovers	3–5	Middlesbrough	Doncaster
14:00 BST	Molyneux 40'; Sharp 47' (pen.); Ironside 71'	Report	Hackney 23'; Azaz 49'; McGree 54'; Latte Lath 63'; Finch 82'	Stadium: Eco-Power Stadium

31 July 2024 Friendly	Harrogate Town	0–0	Middlesbrough	Harrogate
19:30 BST		Report		Stadium: Wetherby Road

3 August 2024 Friendly	Middlesbrough	1–0	Heerenveen	Middlesbrough
15:00 BST	Burgzorg 90+2' (pen.)	Report		Stadium: Riverside Stadium

== Competitions ==
=== Championship ===
==== League table ====
Pos	Team	Pld	W	D	L	GF	GA	GD	Pts
8	Millwall	46	18	12	16	47	49	−2	66
9	West Bromwich Albion	46	15	19	12	57	47	+10	64
10	Middlesbrough	46	18	10	18	64	56	+8	64
11	Swansea City	46	17	10	19	51	56	−5	61
12	Sheffield Wednesday	46	15	13	18	60	69	−9	58

Source: English Football League
Rules for classification: 1) Points; 2) Goal difference; 3) Number of goals scored; 4) Head-to-head results; 5) Wins; 6) Away goals; 7) Penalty points (sec 9.5); 8) Number of 12-point sending off offences; 9) Play-off (only if needed to determine promotion/relegation)

==== Results summary ====
Overall								Home						Away					
Pld	W	D	L	GF	GA	GD	Pts	W	D	L	GF	GA	GD	W	D	L	GF	GA	GD
46	18	10	18	64	56	+8	64	11	6	6	31	23	+8	7	4	12	33	33	0

Last updated: 26 April 2025.
Source: Soccerway

==== Results by round ====
Round	1	2	3	4	5	6	7	8	9	10	11	12	13	14	15	16	17	18	19	20	21	22	23	24	25	26	27	28	29	30	32	33	34	31^{1}	35	36	37	38	39	40	41	42	43	44	45	46
Ground	H	A	H	A	H	A	H	A	A	H	H	A	H	A	H	A	H	H	A	A	H	A	H	H	A	H	A	H	A	H	A	H	A	A	H	A	H	A	H	A	H	A	H	A	H	A
Result	W	L	D	W	D	L	W	W	L	L	W	D	L	W	W	W	L	W	D	L	W	D	D	D	W	D	L	W	L	L	L	L	L	W	W	L	W	D	W	W	L	L	W	L	D	L
Position	8	11	9	7	10	12	8	7	9	9	8	9	11	8	7	5	6	5	5	7	6	6	7	6	5	5	7	5	6	7	9	11	13	11	8	9	8	8	7	5	7	8	7	7	9	10
Points	3	3	4	7	8	8	11	14	14	14	17	18	18	21	24	27	27	30	31	31	34	35	36	37	40	41	41	44	44	44	44	44	44	47	50	50	53	54	57	60	60	60	63	63	64	64

Source: EFL
A = Away; H = Home; W = Win; D = Draw; L = Loss; P = Postponed
Notes:
- ^{1} Matchday 31 (vs. Stoke City) was postponed due to Stoke's FA Cup involvements

==== Matches ====
On 26 June, the Championship fixtures were announced.

Win Draw Loss Fixtures

10 August 2024 1	Middlesbrough	1–0	Swansea City	Middlesbrough
12:30 BST	Latte Lath 25' (pen.); Engel (yellow card) 39'	Report	Cabango (yellow card) 14'; Franco (yellow card) 43'; Tymon (yellow card) 76'; Thomas (yellow card) 90+4'	Stadium: Riverside Stadium; Attendance: 26,610; Referee: Sam Allison

17 August 2024 2	Derby County	1–0	Middlesbrough	Derby
12:30 BST	Jackson 14', (yellow card) 90+2'; Mendez-Laing (yellow card) 40'; Elder (yellow card) 67'	Report	Latte Lath (yellow card) 42'	Stadium: Pride Park Stadium; Attendance: 29,443; Referee: Bobby Madley
Note: Fixture was initially scheduled for a 15:00 kick-off, but was moved for live Sky Sports broadcast.

24 August 2024 3	Middlesbrough	2–2	Portsmouth	Middlesbrough
15:00 BST	Clarke 11'; Conway 90' (pen.)	Report	Saydee 2', 25', (yellow card) 43'; Towler (yellow card) 42'; Blair (yellow card) 55'; Norris (yellow card) 57'; Williams (yellow card) 80'	Stadium: Riverside Stadium; Attendance: 26,270; Referee: Matt Donohue

31 August 2024 4	Cardiff City	0–2	Middlesbrough	Leckwith
12:30 BST	Siopis (yellow card) 5'; Daland (yellow card) 39'	Report	Clarke 55'; Morris (yellow card) 69'; Ramsey 82' (o.g.)	Stadium: Cardiff City Stadium; Attendance: 18,000; Referee: David Webb
Note: Fixture was initially scheduled for a 15:00 kick-off, but was moved for live Sky Sports broadcast.

14 September 2024 5	Middlesbrough	1–1	Preston North End	Middlesbrough
15:00 BST	Conway 16'	Report	Whatmough (yellow card) 33'; Storey (yellow card) 36'; Frøkjær-Jensen 43'; Hughes (yellow card) 60'; Woodman (yellow card) 74'; Brady (yellow card) 86'	Stadium: Riverside Stadium; Attendance: 25,116; Referee: Tom Nield

21 September 2024 6	Sunderland	1–0	Middlesbrough	Sunderland
12:30 BST	Hume (yellow card) 9'; Rigg 21', (yellow card) 70'; Roberts (yellow card) 45+1'	Report	Latte Lath (yellow card) 20'; Doak (yellow card) 87'	Stadium: Stadium of Light; Referee: Simon Hooper
Note: Fixture was initially scheduled for a 15:00 kick-off, but was moved for live Sky Sports broadcast.

28 September 2024 7	Middlesbrough	2–0	Stoke City	Middlesbrough
15:00 BST	Doak 43', (yellow card) 56'; Edmundson (yellow card) 43'; Hackney (yellow card) 45+1' (goal) 73'; Azaz (yellow card) 66'	Report	Burger (yellow card) 11'; Manhoef (yellow card) 27'; Wilmot (yellow card) 39'; Cannon (yellow card) 42'; Tchamadeu (yellow card) 59'; Gallagher (yellow card) 69'; Rose (yellow card) 82'	Stadium: Riverside Stadium; Attendance: 24,610; Referee: Stephen Martin

1 October 2024 8	West Bromwich Albion	0–1	Middlesbrough	West Bromwich
20:00 BST	Mowatt (yellow card) 34'; Račić (yellow card) 59'	Report	Hackney 73'; Jones (yellow card) 90+6'	Stadium: The Hawthorns; Attendance: 23,769; Referee: David Webb
Note: Fixture was initially scheduled for a 19:45 kick-off, but was moved for live Sky Sports broadcast.

5 October 2024 9	Watford	2–1	Middlesbrough	Watford
15:00 BST	Kayembe 75'; Baah 87', (yellow card) 90+1'; Porteous (yellow card) 89'; Chakvetadze (yellow card) 90+5'	Report	Hackney (yellow card) 23'; Edmundson 54'	Stadium: Vicarage Road; Attendance: 20,002; Referee: Matt Donohue

19 October 2024 10	Middlesbrough	0–2	Bristol City	Middlesbrough
15:00 BST	Hackney (yellow card) 3'; van den Berg (yellow card) 8'; Azaz (yellow card) 13'; Doak (yellow card) 50'; Ayling (yellow card) 56'	Report	Mehmeti 27'; McCrorie (yellow card) 41'; McNally (yellow card) 43'; Hirakawa 45+2'; Earthy (yellow card) 83'	Stadium: Riverside Stadium; Attendance: 24,438; Referee: Sam Allison

23 October 2024 11	Middlesbrough	1–0	Sheffield United	Middlesbrough
20:00 BST	Latte Lath 80'	Report	Hamer (yellow card) 75'	Stadium: Riverside Stadium; Attendance: 24,303; Referee: Andy Davies
Note: Fixture was initially scheduled for a 19:45 kick-off, but was moved for live Sky Sports broadcast.

27 October 2024 12	Norwich City	3–3	Middlesbrough	Norwich
15:00 BST	Sainz 8', 71'; Ben Slimane (yellow card) 58'; Fisher (yellow card) 74'; Dieng 80' (o.g.); McLean (red card) 87'	Report	Conway 13', 40'; Morris (yellow card) 23'; Edmundson (yellow card) 25'; Azaz 45+2'; McGree (yellow card) 70'	Stadium: Carrow Road; Attendance: 26,487; Referee: James Bell
Note: Fixture was initially scheduled for 26 October, but was moved for live Sky Sports broadcast.

2 November 2024 13	Middlesbrough	0–3	Coventry City	Middlesbrough
15:00 GMT	Hackney (yellow card) 12' (yellow-red card) 22'; Edmundson (yellow card) 85'	Report	Rudoni (yellow card) 25'; Thomas-Asante (yellow card) 33'; Thomas 42', (yellow card) 45+1'; Wright 76'; Eccles 81'	Stadium: Riverside Stadium; Attendance: 24,921; Referee: Thomas Bramall

5 November 2024 14	Queens Park Rangers	1–4	Middlesbrough	Shepherd's Bush
19:45 GMT	Dijksteel 69' (o.g.)	Report	Doak (yellow card) 11'; McGree 31'; Conway 35'; Borges (yellow card) 45+3'; Latte Lath 87'; Barlaser 90+5'	Stadium: Loftus Road; Attendance: 14,054; Referee: Oliver Langford

9 November 2024 15	Middlesbrough	5–1	Luton Town	Middlesbrough
12:30 GMT	Burgzorg 30', (yellow card) 31', (goal) 54'; Latte Lath 42'; Azaz 51', 87'	Report	Baptiste (yellow card) 15'; Hashioka (yellow card) 49'; Clark (yellow card) 62' (goal) 77'; Morris (yellow card) 66'	Stadium: Riverside Stadium; Attendance: 23,692; Referee: Tony Harrington
Note: Fixture was initially scheduled for a 15:00 kick-off, but was moved for live Sky Sports broadcast.

23 November 2024 16	Oxford United	2–6	Middlesbrough	Littlemore
15:00 GMT	Leigh 24'; Scarlett 72'; Moore (yellow card) 35'	Report	Latte Lath 37' (pen.), 45', 49'; Azaz (yellow card) 27' (goal) 42', 83'; Conway 80'; Neto Borges (yellow card) 60'; Edmundson (yellow card) 90+3'	Stadium: Kassam Stadium; Attendance: 11,442; Referee: Josh Smith

27 November 2024 17	Middlesbrough	0–1	Blackburn Rovers	Middlesbrough
19:45 GMT	McGree (yellow card) 13'	Report	Hyam 77'	Stadium: Riverside Stadium; Attendance: 22,751; Referee: James Bell

30 November 2024 18	Middlesbrough	3–1	Hull City	Middlesbrough
12:30 GMT	Azaz 24'; Conway 41', 79'; Borges (yellow card) 46'	Report	Coyle (yellow card) 39'; Burstow 71'; McLoughlin (yellow card) 72'	Stadium: Riverside Stadium; Attendance: 24,121; Referee: Stephen Martin
Note: Fixture was initially scheduled for a 15:00 kick-off, but was moved for live Sky Sports broadcast.

6 December 2024 19	Burnley	1–1	Middlesbrough	Burnley
20:00 GMT	Roberts 37'; Mejbri (yellow card) 90+3'	Report	Dijksteel 13'	Stadium: Turf Moor; Attendance: 20,543; Referee: Andrew Kitchen
Note: Fixture was initially scheduled for 7 December, but was moved for live Sky Sports broadcast.

10 December 2024 20	Leeds United	3–1	Middlesbrough	Leeds
20:00 GMT	Gnonto 14'; James 74'; Wöber (yellow card) 89'; Aaronson 90+2'	Report	Wöber 54' (o.g.); Edmundson (yellow card) 71'; Dijksteel (yellow card) 80'	Stadium: Elland Road; Attendance: 36,422; Referee: Ben Toner
Note: Fixture was initially scheduled for a 19:45 kick-off, but was moved for live Sky Sports broadcast.

14 December 2024 21	Middlesbrough	1–0	Millwall	Middlesbrough
15:00 GMT	Latte Lath 10', (yellow card) 37'; Dijksteel (yellow card) 65'	Report	Tanganga (yellow card) 54'; Mitchell (yellow card) 90'	Stadium: Riverside Stadium; Attendance: 23,445; Referee: Geoff Eltringham

21 December 2024 22	Plymouth Argyle	3–3	Middlesbrough	Plymouth
15:00 GMT	Gibson 38'; Gyabi 72', (yellow card) 87'; Ogbeta (yellow card) 77'; Bundu 81'	Report	Howson 50'; Edmundson (yellow card) 70'; Hackney 77'; Latte Lath 84'; Doak (yellow card) 90+6'	Stadium: Home Park; Attendance: 16,550; Referee: Will Finnie

26 December 2024 23	Middlesbrough	3–3	Sheffield Wednesday	Middlesbrough
15:00 GMT	Doak 5'; Azaz 15', 30'; van den Berg (yellow card) 39' (yellow-red card) 55'	Report	Ingelsson 47'; Windass 54'; Valery 61', (yellow card) 71'; Gassama (yellow card) 78'	Stadium: Riverside Stadium; Attendance: 32,147; Referee: Anthony Backhouse

29 December 2024 24	Middlesbrough	0–0	Burnley	Middlesbrough
20:00 GMT	Edmundson (yellow card) 3'	Report	Cullen (yellow card) 54'; Roberts (yellow card) 83'; Koleosho (yellow card) 86'	Stadium: Riverside Stadium; Attendance: 27,686; Referee: Josh Smith
Note: Fixture was initially scheduled for 28 December, but was moved for live Sky Sports broadcast.

1 January 2025 25	Hull City	0–1	Middlesbrough	Kingston upon Hull
17:30 GMT	Vaughan (yellow card) 84'; Jones (yellow card) 87'	Report	Barlaser (yellow card) 14'; Gilbert 90+3'	Stadium: MKM Stadium; Attendance: 21,585; Referee: Leigh Doughty

4 January 2025 26	Middlesbrough	1–1	Cardiff City	Middlesbrough
15:00 GMT	Latte Lath 12'; Doak (yellow card) 75'; Barlaser (yellow card) 89'	Report	Chambers 21'; O'Dowda (yellow card) 30'; Rinomhota (yellow card) 76'; Robertson (yellow card) 80'	Stadium: Riverside Stadium; Attendance: 24,634; Referee: Tom Nield

18 January 2025 27	Portsmouth	2–1	Middlesbrough	Milton
15:00 GMT	Ritchie (yellow card) 40', (goal) 54', 82'	Report	Doak (yellow card) 24'; Latte Lath 30'; Edmundson (yellow card) 55'; Ayling (yellow card) 90+4'	Stadium: Fratton Park; Attendance: 20,389; Referee: Gavin Ward

21 January 2025 28	Middlesbrough	2–0	West Bromwich Albion	Middlesbrough
15:00 GMT	Hackney 29'; Fry (yellow card) 79'; Doak 83'	Report		Stadium: Riverside Stadium; Attendance: 22,323; Referee: Andrew Kitchen

25 January 2025 29	Preston North End	2–1	Middlesbrough	Preston
15:00 GMT	Greenwood (yellow card) 12'; Þórðarson 28'; Meghoma (yellow card) 45+1'; Jacoksen 78'; Ledson (yellow card) 85'	Report	Ayling (yellow card) 41'; Burgzorg 52'	Stadium: Deepdale; Attendance: 18,474; Referee: John Busby

3 February 2025 30	Middlesbrough	2–3	Sunderland	Middlesbrough
20:00 GMT	Burgzorg 11', (yellow card) 78'; Morris (yellow card) 21'; Hackney 59'	Report	Neil 33'; O'Nien (yellow card) 45'; Isidor 51'; Bellingham (yellow card) 64'; Giles 87' (o.g.); Poveda (yellow card) 90+5'	Stadium: Riverside Stadium; Attendance: 29,161; Referee: Stephen Martin
Note: Fixture was initially scheduled for 1 February, but was moved for live Sky Sports broadcasting.

12 February 2025 32	Sheffield United	3–1	Middlesbrough	Sheffield
20:00 GMT	Rak-Sakyi 32'; Robinson (yellow card) 43'; Cooper (yellow card) 44'; Brereton Díaz 75'; Ahmedhodžić 87'	Report	Azaz (yellow card) 34'; Edmundson (yellow card) 43'; Burgzorg 45' (pen.); Ayling (yellow card) 73'	Stadium: Bramall Lane; Attendance: 27,124; Referee: Matthew Donohue
Note: Fixture was initially scheduled for a 19:45 kick-off, but was moved for live Sky Sports broadcasting.

15 February 2025 33	Middlesbrough	0–1	Watford	Middlesbrough
15:00 GMT	Ayling (yellow card) 47'; Forss (yellow card) 83'	Report	Sissoko 40'; Chakvetadze (yellow card) 65'; Selvik (yellow card) 81'	Stadium: Riverside Stadium; Attendance: 24,326; Referee: Adam Herczeg

21 February 2025 34	Bristol City	2–1	Middlesbrough	Ashton Gate
19:45 GMT	Earthy 72', 82'	Report	Conway 37'; Dijksteel (yellow card) 57'; Hackney (yellow card) 78'	Stadium: Ashton Gate; Attendance: 21,894; Referee: Tom Nield
Note: Fixture was initially scheduled for 22 February, but was pushed forward a day earlier.

25 February 2025 31	Stoke City	1–3	Middlesbrough	Stoke on Trent
19:45 GMT	Bae Jun-ho 45', (yellow card) 78'; Moran (yellow card) 83'	Report	Forss 20'; Azaz 52'; Conway 73', (yellow card) 78'; Borges (yellow card) 75'	Stadium: Bet365 Stadium; Attendance: 20,141; Referee: Andy Davies
Note: Fixture was initially scheduled for 8 February, but was moved for live Sky Sports broadcasting. The match was then later postponed, due to Stoke's FA Cup involvements.

1 March 2025 35	Middlesbrough	1–0	Derby County	Middlesbrough
15:00 GMT	Azaz 80', (yellow card) 81'	Report	Barkhuizen (yellow card) 19'; Forsyth (yellow card) 90+4'	Stadium: Riverside Stadium; Attendance: 25,839; Referee: Gavin Ward

8 March 2025 36	Swansea City	1–0	Middlesbrough	Landore
15:00 GMT	Eom Ji-sung 26'; Franco (yellow card) 43'	Report	Dijksteel (yellow card) 28'	Stadium: Swansea.com Stadium; Attendance: 13,986; Referee: Ruebyn Ricardo

11 March 2025 37	Middlesbrough	2–1	Queens Park Rangers	Middlesbrough
19:45 GMT	Conway 11'; Dijksteel 58'	Report	Cook 80'	Stadium: Riverside Stadium; Attendance: 22,177; Referee: David Webb

15 March 2025 38	Luton Town	0–0	Middlesbrough	Luton
15:00 GMT	Brown (yellow card) 64'; Walsh (yellow card) 67'	Report	Iling-Junior (yellow card) 24'; Dijksteel (yellow card) 75'; Hackney (yellow card) 89'	Stadium: Kenilworth Road; Attendance: 11,815; Referee: Farai Hallam

29 March 2025 39	Middlesbrough	2–1	Oxford United	Middlesbrough
15:00 GMT	Iheanacho 48'; Borges 80'	Report	Helik 38'; Harris (yellow card) 58'; Romeny (yellow card) 87'	Stadium: Riverside Stadium; Attendance: 24,624; Referee: Matthew Donohue

4 April 2025 40	Blackburn Rovers	0–2	Middlesbrough	Blackburn
20:00 BST	Gueye (yellow card) 23'; Buckley (yellow card) 62'	Report	Conway 2'; Iling-Junior 8'	Stadium: Ewood Park; Attendance: 15,638; Referee: John Busby
Note: Fixture was initially scheduled for 5 April, but was moved for live Sky Sports broadcasting.

8 April 2025 41	Middlesbrough	0–1	Leeds United	Middlesbrough
20:00 BST	Morris (yellow card) 74'	Report	James 2'; Bryam (yellow card) 75'	Stadium: Riverside Stadium; Attendance: 28,729; Referee: Andrew Kitchen
Note: Fixture was initially scheduled for a 19:45 kick-off, but was moved for live Sky Sports broadcasting.

12 April 2025 42	Millwall	1–0	Middlesbrough	Bermondsey
15:00 BST	Neghli 65'; Azeez (yellow card) 88'	Report		Stadium: The Den; Referee: Tom Nield

18 April 2025 43	Middlesbrough	2–1	Plymouth Argyle	Middlesbrough
15:00 BST	Azaz 12'; Conway 90+3' (pen.)	Report	Bundu 17'; Pleguezuelo (yellow card) 45+2'; Hazard (yellow card) 52'; Edwards (red card) 90+2'	Stadium: Riverside Stadium; Attendance: 26,276; Referee: Anthony Backhouse

21 April 2025 44	Sheffield Wednesday	2–1	Middlesbrough	Sheffield
15:00 BST	Smith (yellow card) 13'; Ingelsson (yellow card) 21'; Paterson (yellow card) 51'; Windass 54'; Musaba 89'	Report	Azaz 11', (yellow card) 84'; Conway (penalty missed) 22'; Hackney (yellow card) 36'; Travers (yellow card) 55'; van den Berg (yellow card) 69'	Stadium: Hillsborough Stadium; Attendance: 27,668; Referee: Bobby Madley

26 April 2025 45	Middlesbrough	0–0	Norwich City	Middlesbrough
15:00 BST	Iling-Junior (yellow card) 43'	Report	Stacey (yellow card) 45'; Sainz (yellow card) 90+2'	Stadium: Riverside Stadium; Attendance: 26,374; Referee: Dean Whitestone

3 May 2025 46	Coventry City	2–0	Middlesbrough	Coventry
12:30 BST	Rudoni 44', 87'; Sheaf (yellow card) 74'	Report	Hackney (yellow card) 17'	Stadium: Coventry Building Society Arena; Attendance: 31,452; Referee: Stuart Attwell
Note: Fixture was initially scheduled for a 15:00 kick-off, but all EFL Championship final matchday fixtures were moved to an earlier kick-off.

=== FA Cup ===
Middlesbrough entered the FA Cup at the third round stage, and were drawn at home to Blackburn Rovers.

Win Draw Loss Fixtures

11 January 2025 Third round	Middlesbrough	0–1	Blackburn Rovers	Middlesbrough
12:00 GMT	McCabe (yellow card) 47'	Report	Weimann 70'	Stadium: Riverside Stadium; Attendance: 16,794; Referee: Dean Whitestone

=== EFL Cup ===
On 27 June, the draw for the first round was made, with Middlesbrough being drawn away against Leeds United. In the second round, they were drawn at home to Stoke City.

Win Draw Loss Fixtures

14 August 2024 First round	Leeds United	0–3	Middlesbrough	Leeds
20:00 BST	Byram (yellow card) 35'; Firpo (yellow card) 45+4'; Struijk (yellow card) 90+2'	Report	Howson (yellow card) 25'; Dijksteel 50'; Burgzorg 60'; Coburn 67'; Ayling (yellow card) 69'; Gilbert (yellow card) 76'	Stadium: Elland Road; Attendance: 35,150; Referee: Anthony Backhouse

27 August 2024 Second round	Middlesbrough	0–5	Stoke City	Middlesbrough
19:15 BST	McCabe (yellow card) 77'	Report	Tezgel 14'; Mmaee 57'; Koumas 60'; Manhoef 65', 69'	Stadium: Riverside Stadium; Attendance: 17,408; Referee: Geoff Eltringham

== Statistics ==
=== Appearances and goals ===
Players with no appearances are not included on the list

No.	Pos	Nat	Player	Total		Championship		FA Cup		EFL Cup	
No.	Pos	Nat	Player	Apps	Goals	Apps	Goals	Apps	Goals	Apps	Goals
1	GK	(Senegal) SEN	Seny Dieng	17	0	17+0	0	0+0	0	0+0	0
3	DF	(Netherlands) NED	Rav van den Berg	27	0	23+4	0	0+0	0	0+0	0
4	MF	(England) ENG	Daniel Barlaser	26	1	12+11	1	1+0	0	2+0	0
6	DF	(England) ENG	Dael Fry	21	0	15+6	0	0+0	0	0+0	0
7	MF	(England) ENG	Hayden Hackney	44	5	43+0	5	0+1	0	0+0	0
8	FW	(Australia) AUS	Riley McGree	18	1	11+6	1	1+0	0	0+0	0
9	FW	(Nigeria) NGR	Kelechi Iheanacho	15	1	9+6	1	0+0	0	0+0	0
10	FW	(Netherlands) NED	Delano Burgzorg	44	6	23+19	5	1+0	0	1+0	1
11	FW	(England) ENG	Morgan Whittaker	16	0	11+5	0	0+0	0	0+0	0
12	DF	(England) ENG	Luke Ayling	28	0	23+3	0	0+0	0	1+1	0
14	FW	(Republic of Ireland) IRL	Alex Gilbert	10	1	0+7	1	1+0	0	2+0	0
15	DF	(Suriname) SUR	Anfernee Dijksteel	36	3	27+6	2	1+0	0	1+1	1
16	MF	(England) ENG	Jonny Howson	22	1	15+6	1	0+0	0	1+0	0
17	FW	(England) ENG	Micah Hamilton	16	0	2+11	0	1+0	0	1+1	0
18	MF	(United States) USA	Aidan Morris	37	0	33+2	0	0+0	0	1+1	0
19	FW	(England) ENG	Josh Coburn	4	1	0+2	0	0+0	0	2+0	1
20	MF	(Republic of Ireland) IRL	Finn Azaz	46	12	43+2	12	0+0	0	0+1	0
21	FW	(Finland) FIN	Marcus Forss	25	1	6+18	1	0+1	0	0+0	0
22	FW	(Scotland) SCO	Tommy Conway	37	13	27+9	13	0+0	0	0+1	0
23	GK	(Australia) AUS	Tom Glover	8	0	6+1	0	1+0	0	0+0	0
25	DF	(England) ENG	George Edmundson	25	1	24+0	1	1+0	0	0+0	0
27	DF	(Denmark) DEN	Lukas Engel	12	0	4+5	0	1+0	0	1+1	0
28	DF	(England) ENG	Ryan Giles	12	0	3+9	0	0+0	0	0+0	0
29	FW	(England) ENG	Samuel Iling-Junior	16	1	11+5	1	0+0	0	0+0	0
30	DF	(Brazil) BRA	Neto Borges	35	1	34+1	1	0+0	0	0+0	0
31	GK	(England) ENG	Sol Brynn	8	0	6+0	0	0+0	0	2+0	0
32	GK	(Republic of Ireland) IRL	Mark Travers	17	0	17+0	0	0+0	0	0+0	0
37	DF	(England) ENG	George McCormick	3	0	0+1	0	0+0	0	1+1	0
39	FW	(England) ENG	Sonny Finch	1	0	0+0	0	0+0	0	1+0	0
41	DF	(England) ENG	Harley Hunt	1	0	0+0	0	0+0	0	1+0	0
44	DF	(England) ENG	Nathan Simpson	1	0	0+1	0	0+0	0	0+0	0
49	MF	(England) ENG	Law McCabe	2	0	0+0	0	1+0	0	1+0	0
50	FW	(Scotland) SCO	Ben Doak	24	3	21+3	3	0+0	0	0+0	0
Player(s) who featured but departed the club permanently during the season:
5	DF	(England) ENG	Matthew Clarke	17	2	12+2	2	1+0	0	2+0	0
9	FW	(Ivory Coast) CIV	Emmanuel Latte Lath	31	11	20+9	11	0+1	0	0+1	0
11	FW	(England) ENG	Isaiah Jones	23	0	8+13	0	0+0	0	1+1	0
