= Sol Brynn =

English footballer (born 2000)

Personal information
- Full name: Solomon Brynn
- Date of birth: 30 October 2000 (age 26)
- Place of birth: Middlesbrough, England
- Height: 1.84 m (6 ft 0 in)
- Position: Goalkeeper

Team information
- Current team: Middlesbrough
- Number: 31

Youth career
- 2009–2020: Middlesbrough

Senior career*
Years	Team	Apps	(Gls)
2020–	Middlesbrough	52	(0)
2021	→ Darlington (loan)	0	(0)
2021	→ Queen of the South (loan)	16	(0)
2022–2023	→ Swindon Town (loan)	46	(0)
2023–2024	→ Leyton Orient (loan)	42	(0)
- * Club domestic league appearances and goals as of 20:39, 8 September 2026 (UTC)

Solomon Brynn (born 30 October 2000) is an English professional footballer who plays as a goalkeeper for EFL Championship club Middlesbrough.

== Career ==
Born in Middlesbrough, North Yorkshire, Brynn began his career with Middlesbrough in 2009, moving on loan to Darlington in February 2021.

On 18 August 2021, Brynn signed for Scottish Championship side Queen of the South on a season-long loan. He made his debut for the club on 21 August 2021, in a 3–2 win against Greenock Morton. On 30 December 2021, he was recalled by his parent club.

On 23 June 2022, Brynn joined League Two side Swindon Town on a season-long loan. He made his debut for the club on 30 July 2022, in a 3–0 defeat to Harrogate Town. During his time at Swindon, he won three player of the month awards and was voted as their player of the season. On 30 May 2023, it was announced by Middlesbrough that Brynn had signed a two-year contract extension with the club.

On 10 July 2023, Brynn joined League One side Leyton Orient on a season-long loan. He made his debut for the club on 5 August 2023, in a 1–0 defeat to Charlton Athletic.

Brynn made his debut for Middlesbrough on 14 August 2024, in a 3–0 win against Leeds United in the EFL Cup. On 15 October 2024, he signed a new four-year contract with Middlesbrough. In December 2024, he was praised by teammate Jonny Howson.

Brynn established himself as Middlesbrough's first-choice goalkeeper in the 2025–26 season, although his performances overall were said to be "mixed".

== International career ==
In March 2018, Brynn was called-up for the England under-18 squad and remained on the bench as an unused substitute during their fixtures.

== Career statistics ==
As of match played on 8 September 2026

Appearances and goals by club, season and competition
Club	Season	League			National cup (Note: Includes FA Cup, Scottish Cup)		League cup (Note: Includes EFL Cup, Scottish League Cup)		Other		Total	
Club	Season	Division	Apps	Goals	Apps	Goals	Apps	Goals	Apps	Goals	Apps	Goals
Middlesbrough	2020–21	Championship	0	0	0	0	0	0	0	0	0	0
Middlesbrough	2021–22	Championship	0	0	0	0	0	0	0	0	0	0
Middlesbrough	2022–23	Championship	0	0	0	0	0	0	0	0	0	0
Middlesbrough	2023–24	Championship	0	0	0	0	0	0	0	0	0	0
Middlesbrough	2024–25	Championship	6	0	0	0	2	0	0	0	8	0
Middlesbrough	2025–26	Championship	46	0	1	0	0	0	3 (Note: Appearances in the EFL Championship play-offs)	0	50	0
Middlesbrough	2026–27	Championship	0	0	0	0	3	0	0	0	3	0
Middlesbrough	Total		52	0	1	0	5	0	3	0	61	0
Darlington (loan)	2020–21	National League North	0	0	0	0	0	0	1 (Note: Appearance in the FA Trophy)	0	1	0
Queen of the South (loan)	2021–22	Scottish Championship	16	0	2	0	0	0	3 (Note: Appearances in the Scottish Challenge Cup)	0	21	0
Swindon Town (loan)	2022–23	League Two	46	0	1	0	0	0	2 (Note: Appearance(s) in the EFL Trophy)	0	49	0
Leyton Orient (loan)	2023–24	League One	42	0	2	0	0	0	1	0	45	0
Career total			156	0	6	0	5	0	9	0	176	0
