= Emmanuel Latte Lath =

Ivorian footballer (born 1999)

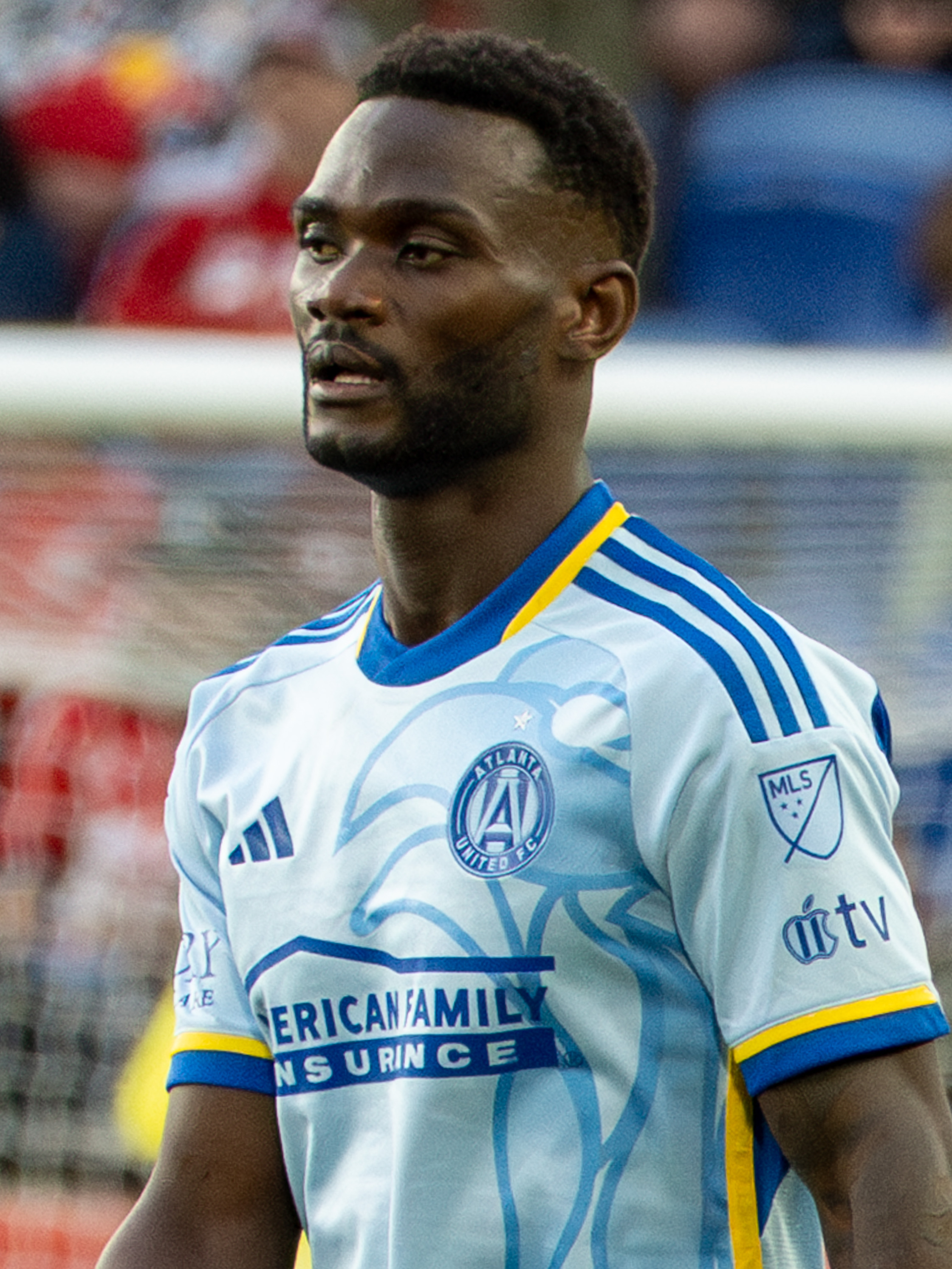
- Latte Lath with Atlanta United in 2025

Personal information
- Full name: Emmanuel Delan Junior Latte Lath
- Date of birth: 1 January 1999 (age 27)
- Place of birth: Marcory, Abidjan, Ivory Coast
- Height: 1.77 m (5 ft 10 in)
- Position: Striker

Team information
- Current team: Union Berlin (on loan from Atlanta United)
- Number: 29

Youth career
- Esperia Calcio
- –2016: Atalanta

Senior career*
Years	Team	Apps	(Gls)
2016–2023	Atalanta	0	(0)
2017–2018	→ Pescara (loan)	0	(0)
2018–2019	→ Pistoiese (loan)	18	(2)
2019	→ Carrarese (loan)	17	(0)
2019–2020	→ Imolese (loan)	19	(2)
2020	→ Pianese (loan)	5	(0)
2020–2021	→ Pro Patria (loan)	34	(9)
2021–2022	→ SPAL (loan)	18	(3)
2022–2023	→ St. Gallen (loan)	31	(14)
2023–2025	Middlesbrough	59	(27)
2025–	Atlanta United	44	(9)
2026–	→ Union Berlin (loan)	6	(1)

International career^{‡}
2024–	Ivory Coast	4	(0)
- * Club domestic league appearances and goals as of 1 November 2026 ‡ National team caps and goals as of 21 June 2025

Emmanuel Delan Junior Latte Lath (born 1 January 1999) is an Ivorian professional footballer who plays as a striker for Bundesliga club Union Berlin, on loan from Major League Soccer (MLS) club Atlanta United, and the Ivory Coast national team.

Latte Lath has previously played for Middlesbrough and before them Atalanta and had loan periods with Italian clubs Pescara, Pistoiese, Carrarese, Imolese, Pianese, Pro Patria, SPAL, and Swiss club St. Gallen.

== Early life ==
Latte Lath was born in Marcory, a suburb of Abidjan, Ivory Coast. At the age of eight, he and his mother immigrated to Italy, arriving in the Province of Cremona to join his father.

== Club career ==
Latte Lath played for Esperia Calcio in Cremona. After featuring for Atalanta's Primavera squad, Latte Lath was promoted to the senior side for the 2016–17 season.

On 13 August 2016, Latte Lath made his senior debut as a substitute in a 3–0 victory against Cremonese in the Coppa Italia, replacing Alejandro Gómez in the 77th minute. His second appearance of the competition came in late November in another 3–0 win for La Dea, this time against Serie A rivals Pescara. On 11 January 2017, he scored his first senior goal for Atalanta, in a 3–2 Coppa Italia defeat to Juventus.

Latte Lath joined newly relegated Serie B side Pescara on a season-long loan. He joined Pistoiese on loan on 7 July 2018. On 24 January 2019, he moved on another loan, to Carrarese. On 10 July 2019, he was loaned to Imolese. On 11 September 2020, he joined Pro Patria on loan. On 12 July 2021, he moved to Serie B club SPAL on a season-long loan. Latte Lath joined Swiss Super League club St. Gallen on a season-long loan on 2 July 2022.

=== Middlesbrough ===
Latte Lath joined EFL Championship club Middlesbrough on a permanent deal on 15 August 2023, signing a four-year contract with an option for an additional year. He made his debut for the club on 19 August, in a 1–1 draw against Huddersfield Town. He scored his first goal for the club on 26 August, in a 4–2 defeat to West Bromwich Albion. He finished the 2023–24 season as Middlesbrough's top scorer with 16 league goals and 18 in all competitions. A strong end to the season, including a run of seven goals in six matches, saw Latte Lath named EFL Championship Player of the Month for April 2024.

=== Atlanta United ===
On 4 February 2025, Latte Lath signed a four-year deal with Major League Soccer (MLS) side Atlanta United for a league record transfer fee, reported to be worth $22 million plus add-ons. This was also a club record sale for Middlesbrough. He made his debut for the club in their season opener against CF Montréal on 22 February, scoring two goals.

==== Loan to Union Berlin ====
On 2 August 2026, Latte Lath joined German Bundesliga side Union Berlin on loan.

== International career ==
Latte Lath made his debut for the Ivory Coast national team on 7 June 2024 in a World Cup qualifier against Gabon at the Amadou Gon Coulibaly Stadium. He came on for Oumar Diakité in the 86th minute of a 1–0 Ivory Coast victory.

== Career statistics ==
=== Club ===
As of match played 1 November 2026

Appearances and goals by club, season and competition
Club	Season	League			National cup (Note: Includes Coppa Italia, Swiss Cup, FA Cup, U.S. Open Cup)		League cup (Note: Includes EFL Cup)		Other		Total	
Club	Season	Division	Apps	Goals	Apps	Goals	Apps	Goals	Apps	Goals	Apps	Goals
Atalanta	2016–17	Serie A	0	0	3	1	—		—		3	1
Atalanta	2017–18	Serie A	0	0	0	0	—		—		0	0
Atalanta	2018–19	Serie A	0	0	0	0	—		—		0	0
Atalanta	2019–20	Serie A	0	0	0	0	—		—		0	0
Atalanta	2020–21	Serie A	0	0	0	0	—		—		0	0
Atalanta	2021–22	Serie A	0	0	0	0	—		—		0	0
Atalanta	2022–23	Serie A	0	0	0	0	—		—		0	0
Atalanta	Total		0	0	3	1	—		—		3	1
Pescara (loan)	2017–18	Serie B	0	0	0	0	—		—		0	0
Pistoiese (loan)	2018–19	Serie C	18	1	0	0	—		—		18	1
Carrarese (loan)	2018–19	Serie C	14	0	—		—		4 (Note: One appearance and one goal in Coppa Italia Serie C, three appearances in Serie C Promotion play-offs)	1	18	1
Imolese (loan)	2019–20	Serie C	19	2	3	1	—		—		22	3
Pianese (loan)	2019–20	Serie C	4	0	—		—		1 (Note: Appearance in Serie C Relegation play-offs)	0	5	0
Pro Patria (loan)	2020–21	Serie C	33	8	2	2	—		1 (Note: Appearance in Serie C Promotion play-offs)	1	36	11
SPAL (loan)	2021–22	Serie B	18	3	1	0	—		—		19	3
St. Gallen (loan)	2022–23	Swiss Super League	31	14	3	2	—		—		34	16
Middlesbrough	2023–24	Championship	30	16	1	0	5	2	—		36	18
Middlesbrough	2024–25	Championship	29	11	1	0	1	0	—		31	11
Middlesbrough	Total		59	27	2	0	6	2	—		67	29
Atlanta United	2025	MLS	30	7	—		—		2 (Note: Appearances in Leagues Cup)	1	32	8
Atlanta United	2026	MLS	14	2	2	1	—		—		16	3
Atlanta United	Total		44	9	2	1	—		2	1	48	11
Union Berlin (loan)	2026–27	Bundesliga	6	1	2	0	—		—		8	1
Career total			246	65	18	7	6	2	8	3	278	77

=== International ===
As of match played 10 June 2025

Appearances and goals by national team and year
National team	Year	Apps	Goals
Ivory Coast	2024	2	0
Ivory Coast	2025	2	0
Total		4	0

== Honours ==
Individual

- EFL Championship Player of the Month: April 2024
