= Law McCabe =

English footballer

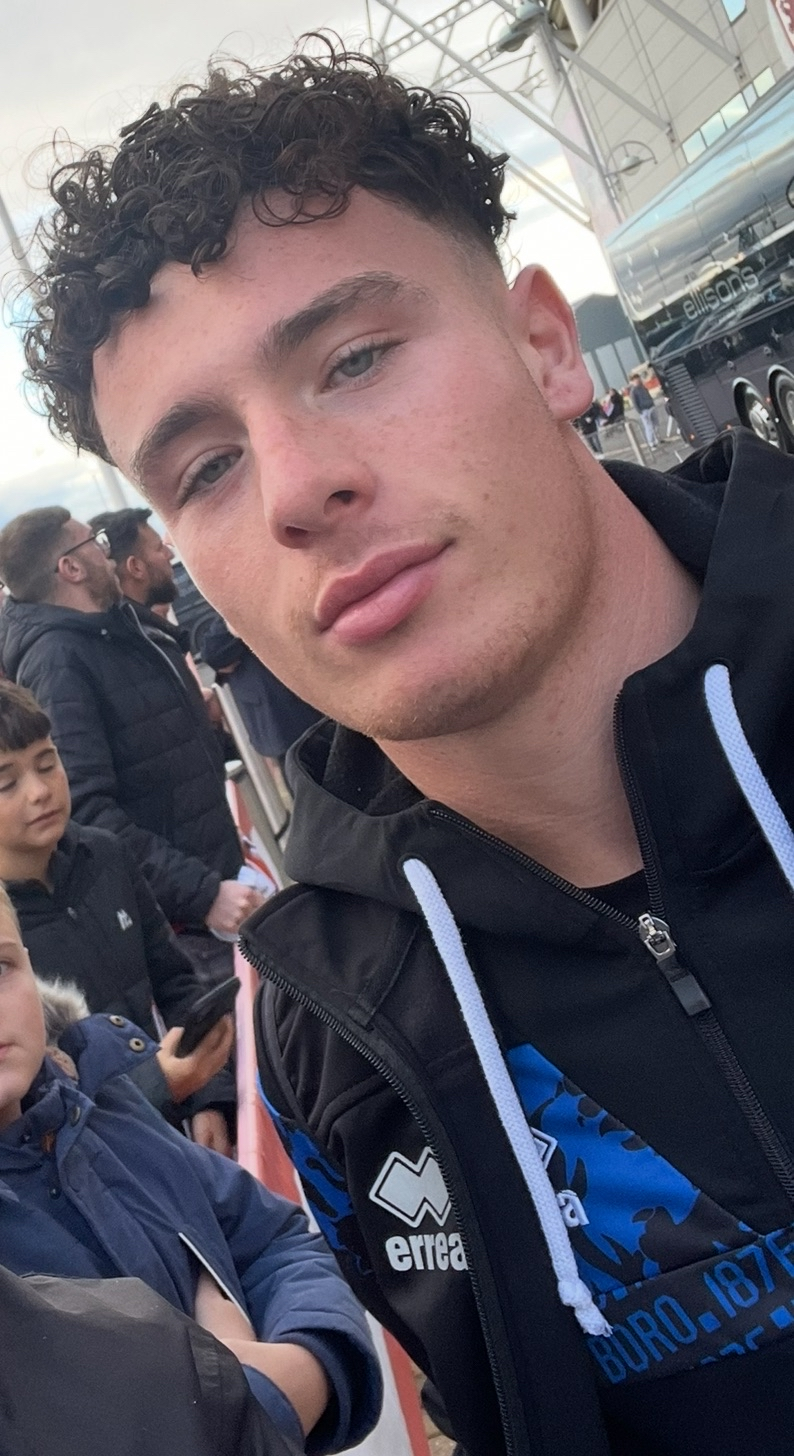
- Law McCabe in 2024.

Personal information
- Full name: Law Marc McCabe
- Date of birth: 16 January 2006 (age 20)
- Place of birth: Middlesbrough, England
- Height: 1.73 m (5 ft 8 in)
- Position: Midfielder

Team information
- Current team: Middlesbrough
- Number: 28

Youth career
- 2015–2023: Middlesbrough

Senior career*
Years	Team	Apps	(Gls)
2023–	Middlesbrough	3	(0)
2025–2026	→ Plymouth Argyle (loan)	11	(0)

International career^{‡}
2023–2024	England U18	4	(0)
2025–	England U20	2	(0)
- * Club domestic league appearances and goals as of 20 December 2025 (UTC) ‡ National team caps and goals as of 15:22, 11 October 2025 (UTC)

Law Marc McCabe (born 16 January 2006) is an English professional footballer who plays as a midfielder for EFL Championship club Middlesbrough.

== Club career ==
=== Middlesbrough ===
McCabe joined the youth academy of Middlesbrough as a under-9, and worked his way up their youth levels. On 28 February 2023, he signed his first professional contract with the club. He made his senior and professional debut with Middlesbrough as a late substitute in a 4–0 EFL Championship win over Preston North End on 28 November 2023. On 8 December 2023, he extended his contract with Middlesbrough until 2027.

=== Plymouth Argyle ===
On 1 September 2025, McCabe signed for Plymouth Argyle on loan On 13 September 2025 he made his Plymouth debut as a late Substitute in a 3-2 EFL League One Win against Luton Town

== International career ==
McCabe is a youth international for England, having been called up to the England U18s for the 2023 Tournoi de Limoges.

== Career statistics ==
As of match played 20 December 2025

Appearances and goals by club, season and competition
Club	Season	League			Cup		League Cup		Other		Total	
Club	Season	Division	Apps	Goals	Apps	Goals	Apps	Goals	Apps	Goals	Apps	Goals
Middlesbrough	2023–24	Championship	3	0	—		1	0	—		4	0
Middlesbrough	2024–25	Championship	0	0	0	0	0	0	—		0	0
Middlesbrough	2025–26	Championship	0	0	0	0	1	0	—		1	0
Middlesbrough	Total		3	0	0	0	2	0	—		5	0
Plymouth Argyle (loan)	2025–26	League One	11	0	1	0	—		1 (Note: Appearances in EFL Trophy)	0	13	0
Career total			14	0	1	0	2	0	1	0	18	0
