= Ajay Matthews =

English footballer (born 2007)

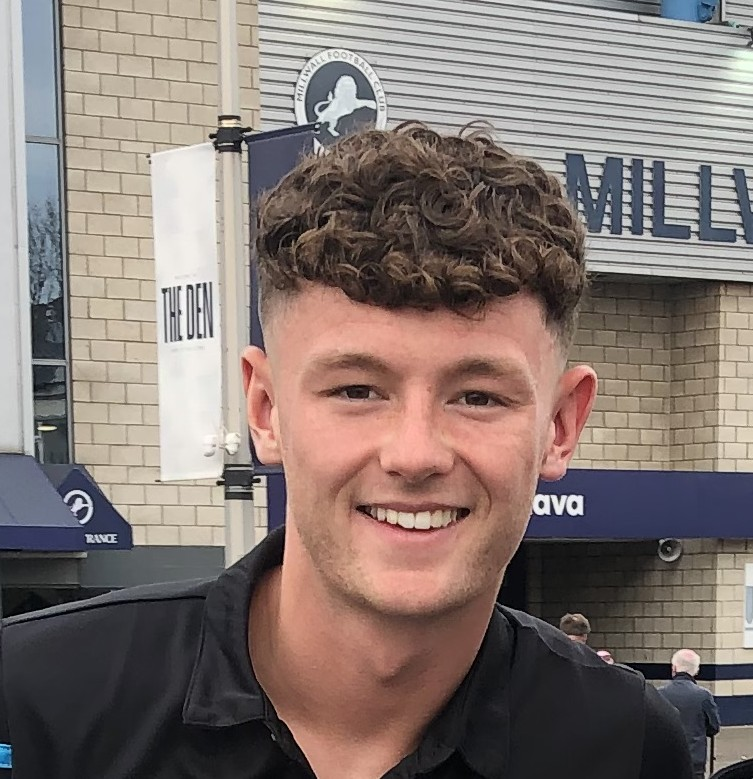
- Matthews in 2025

Personal information
- Full name: Ajay Matthews
- Date of birth: 11 June 2006 (age 20)
- Place of birth: Middlesbrough, England
- Position: Forward

Team information
- Current team: Exeter City (on loan from Millwall)
- Number: 15

Youth career
- 2014–2025: Middlesbrough

Senior career*
| Years | Team | Apps | (Gls) |
| 2024–2025 | Middlesbrough | 2 | (0) |
| 2025– | Millwall | 0 | (0) |
| 2026 | → Leyton Orient (loan) | 4 | (0) |
| 2026– | → Exeter City (loan) | 1 | (0) |

International career^{‡}
| 2022 | England U17 | 3 | (0) |
| 2024 | England U18 | 2 | (1) |
- * Club domestic league appearances and goals as of 18:37, 5 September 2026 (UTC) ‡ National team caps and goals as of 12:06, 28 May 2024 (UTC)

Ajay Matthews (born 11 June 2006) is an English professional footballer who plays as a forward for Exeter City on loan from EFL Championship club Millwall.

== Early life ==
His father Lee Matthews is a former footballer as well as his agent.

== Club career ==
=== Middlesbrough ===
Matthews joined the academy on hometown club Middlesbrough at under-9s level having been spotted playing for local side Marton Juniors. Having progressed through the academy system, he signed a first professional two-year contract in June 2023 following an impressive first season as a scholar.

Ahead of the 2023–24 season, Matthews featured for the first-team in pre-season friendlies, notably scoring against Hartlepool United. On 22 April 2024, Matthews made his first-team senior debut for the club, coming on as a substitute in a 4–3 home defeat to Leeds United. The debut came amidst rumours linking him to a number of top European clubs for the upcoming summer transfer window.

=== Millwall ===
On 30 January 2025, Matthews signed for Championship club Millwall on a long-term contract for an undisclosed fee.

On 16 January 2026, Matthews joined League One club Leyton Orient on loan for the remainder of the 2025–26 season.

On 1 September 2026, he joined League Two club Exeter City on a season-long loan deal.

== International career ==
Matthews represented the England U17 team at the 2022 Nordic Cup.

In May 2024, Matthews was called up for the England U18s and made his debut which he had scored the final goal during a 4–2 win over Northern Ireland and at St. George's Park.

== Career statistics ==
=== Club ===
As of match played 31 January 2026

Appearances and goals by club, season and competition
| Club | Season | League | | | FA Cup | | EFL Cup | | Other | | Total | |
| Club | Season | Division | Apps | Goals | Apps | Goals | Apps | Goals | Apps | Goals | Apps | Goals |
|---|---|---|---|---|---|---|---|---|---|---|---|---|
| Middlesbrough | 2023–24 | Championship | 2 | 0 | 0 | 0 | 0 | 0 | — | | 2 | 0 |
| Middlesbrough | 2024–25 | Championship | 0 | 0 | 0 | 0 | 0 | 0 | — | | 0 | 0 |
| Middlesbrough | Total | | 2 | 0 | 0 | 0 | 0 | 0 | — | | 2 | 0 |
| Millwall | 2024–25 | Championship | 0 | 0 | 0 | 0 | — | | — | | 0 | 0 |
| Millwall | 2025–26 | Championship | 0 | 0 | 1 | 0 | 2 | 0 | — | | 3 | 0 |
| Millwall | Total | | 0 | 0 | 1 | 0 | 2 | 0 | — | | 3 | 0 |
| Leyton Orient (loan) | 2025–26 | League One | 4 | 0 | — | | — | | — | | 4 | 0 |
| Career total | | | 6 | 0 | 1 | 0 | 2 | 0 | — | | 9 | 0 |
