= 2023–24 Middlesbrough F.C. season =

148th season in existence of Middlesbrough FC

Middlesbrough
2023–24 season
- Owner: Steve Gibson
- Chairman: Steve Gibson
- Head Coach: Michael Carrick
- Stadium: Riverside Stadium
- Championship: 8th
- FA Cup: Third round
- EFL Cup: Semi-finals
- Top goalscorer: League: Emmanuel Latte Lath (16); All: Emmanuel Latte Lath (18)
- Average home league attendance: 26,905
Home colours	Away colours	Third colours

The 2023–24 season was the 148th season in the history of Middlesbrough Football Club and their seventh consecutive season in the Championship. The club participated in the Championship, the FA Cup, and the EFL Cup.

== First-team squad ==
As of 21 March 2024

No.	Player	Position	Nationality	Place of birth	Date of birth (age)	Previous club	Date signed	Fee	Contract end
Goalkeepers
1	Seny Dieng	GK	(Senegal)	(Switzerland) Zürich	23 November 1994 (age 31)	Queens Park Rangers	8 July 2023	Undisclosed	30 June 2027
23	Tom Glover	GK	(Australia)	Sydney	24 December 1997 (age 28)	(Australia) Melbourne City	7 July 2023	Free	30 June 2026
32	Jamie Jones	GK	(England)	Kirkby	18 February 1989 (age 37)	Wigan Athletic	18 July 2023	Free	30 June 2024
Defenders
2	Tommy Smith	RB	(England)	Warrington	14 April 1992 (age 34)	Stoke City	27 July 2022	Free	30 June 2025
3	Rav van den Berg	CB	(Netherlands)		7 July 2004 (age 22)	(Netherlands) PEC Zwolle	6 July 2023	Undisclosed	30 June 2027
5	Matthew Clarke	CB	(England)	Barham	22 September 1996 (age 30)	Brighton & Hove Albion	25 August 2022	£2,200,000	30 June 2025
6	Dael Fry	CB	(England)	Middlesbrough	30 August 1997 (age 29)	Academy	1 July 2015	Trainee	30 June 2026
12	Luke Ayling	RB	(England)	Lambeth	25 August 1991 (age 35)	Leeds United	10 January 2024	Loan	31 May 2024
15	Anfernee Dijksteel	RB	(Suriname)	(Netherlands) Amsterdam	27 October 1996 (age 30)	Charlton Athletic	7 August 2019	£2,025,000	30 June 2025
17	Paddy McNair	CB	(Northern Ireland)	Ballyclare	27 April 1995 (age 31)	Sunderland	1 July 2018	£5,000,000	30 June 2024
24	Alex Bangura	LB	(Sierra Leone)	Mokomre	13 July 1999 (age 27)	(Netherlands) Cambuur	1 September 2023	Undisclosed	30 June 2027
26	Darragh Lenihan	CB	(Republic of Ireland)	Dunboyne	16 March 1994 (age 32)	Blackburn Rovers	1 July 2022	Free	30 June 2026
27	Lukas Engel	LB	(Denmark)	Kastrup	14 December 1998 (age 27)	(Denmark) Silkeborg	15 August 2023	Undisclosed	30 June 2027
33	Luke Thomas	LB	(England)	Syston	10 June 2001 (age 25)	Leicester City	26 January 2024	Loan	31 May 2024
Midfielders
4	Daniel Barlaser	CM	(England)	Gateshead	18 January 1997 (age 29)	Rotherham United	29 January 2023	£900,000	30 June 2026
7	Hayden Hackney	CM	(Scotland)	(England) Redcar	26 June 2002 (age 24)	Academy	1 July 2022	Trainee	30 June 2027
8	Riley McGree	LM	(Australia)	Gawler	2 November 1998 (age 28)	(United States) Charlotte	14 January 2022	£3,000,000	30 June 2025
16	Jonny Howson	CM	(England)	Morley	21 May 1988 (age 38)	Norwich City	7 July 2017	£5,000,000	30 June 2024
20	Finn Azaz	CM	(Republic of Ireland)	(England) Westminster	7 September 2000 (age 26)	Aston Villa	5 January 2024	Undisclosed	30 June 2028
28	Lewis O'Brien	CM	(England)	Colchester	14 October 1998 (age 28)	Nottingham Forest	31 August 2023	Loan	31 May 2024
29	Sam Greenwood	AM	(England)	Sunderland	26 January 2002 (age 24)	Leeds United	31 August 2023	Loan	31 May 2024
49	Law McCabe	AM	(England)		12 June 2006 (age 20)	Academy	28 February 2023	Trainee	30 June 2024
50	Finn Cartwright	CM	(England)		28 February 2007 (age 19)	Academy	8 August 2023	Trainee	30 June 2024
52	AJ Bridge	CM	(England)		21 March 2005 (age 21)	Academy	6 January 2023	Trainee	30 June 2025
59	Luke Woolston	DM	(England)		30 November 2004 (age 21)	Academy	31 May 2022	Trainee	30 June 2027
Forwards
9	Emmanuel Latte Lath	CF	(Ivory Coast)	Marcory	1 January 1999 (age 27)	(Italy) Atalanta	15 August 2023	Undisclosed	30 June 2027
11	Isaiah Jones	RW	(England)	Lambeth	26 June 1999 (age 27)	Tooting & Mitcham	1 July 2019	Undisclosed	30 June 2025
13	Matthew Hoppe	CF	(United States)	Yorba Linda	13 March 2001 (age 25)	(Spain) RCD Mallorca	10 August 2022	£2,500,000	30 June 2026
14	Alex Gilbert	LW	(Republic of Ireland)	(England) Birmingham	28 December 2001 (age 24)	Brentford	4 July 2023	Free	30 June 2027
18	Samuel Silvera	LW	(Australia)	(England) London	25 October 2000 (age 26)	(Australia) Central Coast Mariners	7 July 2023	Undisclosed	30 June 2026
19	Josh Coburn	CF	(England)	Bedale	6 December 2002 (age 23)	Sunderland	1 July 2018	Undisclosed	30 June 2027
21	Marcus Forss	CF	(Finland)	Turku	18 June 1999 (age 27)	Brentford	28 July 2022	£3,000,000	30 June 2026
64	Sonny Finch	CF	(England)	Houghton-le-Spring	5 August 2005 (age 21)	Academy	18 August 2022	Trainee	30 June 2026
Out on Loan
22	Hayden Coulson	LB	(England)	Gateshead	17 June 1998 (age 28)	Academy	1 July 2016	Trainee	30 June 2025
23	Liam Roberts	GK	(England)	Walsall	21 November 1994 (age 31)	Northampton Town	1 July 2022	Free	30 June 2024
31	Sol Brynn	GK	(England)	Middlesbrough	30 October 2000 (age 26)	Academy	1 July 2019	Trainee	30 June 2026
38	Daniel Nkrumah	CF	(England)	London	5 November 2003 (age 23)	Leyton Orient	15 June 2023	Undisclosed	30 June 2025
39	Terrell Agyemang	RB	(England)	London	13 November 2002 (age 23)	Manchester City	1 July 2023	Free	30 June 2025
57	Bryant Bilongo	LB	(England)		15 September 2001 (age 25)	Kingstonian	12 January 2022	Undisclosed	30 June 2024

== Transfers ==
=== In ===
Date	Pos	Player	Transferred from	Fee	Ref
30 June 2023	RB	(England) Terrell Agyemang †	(England) Manchester City	Free Transfer	
1 July 2023	CF	(England) Daniel Nkrumah †	(England) Leyton Orient	Undisclosed	
4 July 2023	LW	(Republic of Ireland) Alex Gilbert	(England) Brentford	Free Transfer	
6 July 2023	CB	(Netherlands) Rav van den Berg	(Netherlands) PEC Zwolle	Undisclosed	
7 July 2023	GK	(Australia) Tom Glover	(Australia) Melbourne City	Free Transfer	
7 July 2023	LW	(England) Morgan Rogers	(England) Manchester City	Undisclosed	
7 July 2023	LW	(Australia) Sam Silvera	(Australia) Central Coast Mariners	Undisclosed	
8 July 2023	GK	(Senegal) Seny Dieng	(England) Queens Park Rangers	Undisclosed	
18 July 2023	GK	(England) Jamie Jones	(England) Wigan Athletic	Free Transfer	
15 August 2023	LB	(Denmark) Lukas Engel	(Denmark) Silkeborg	Undisclosed	
15 August 2023	CF	(Ivory Coast) Emmanuel Latte Lath	(Italy) Atalanta	Undisclosed	
1 September 2023	LB	(Sierra Leone) Alex Bangura	(Netherlands) Cambuur	Undisclosed	
5 January 2024	AM	(Republic of Ireland) Finn Azaz	(England) Aston Villa	Undisclosed	

† Signed for the Under-21s

=== Out ===
Date	Pos	Player	Transferred to	Fee	Ref
30 June 2023	CM	(France) Isiah Cornet	Free agent	Released	
30 June 2023	GK	(England) Luke Daniels	(England) Forest Green Rovers	Released	
30 June 2023	CM	(England) Alfie Doherty	(England) Whitby Town	Released	
30 June 2023	CF	(England) Louie Evans	Free agent	Released	
30 June 2023	RB	(England) Darnell Fisher	Free agent	Released	
30 June 2023	CB	(England) Grant Hall	(England) Rotherham United	Released	
30 June 2023	GK	(England) Joe Lumley	(England) Southampton	Released	
30 June 2023	RW	(England) Ash MacCarthy	Free agent	Released	
30 June 2023	LW	(England) Joe Ridley	Free agent	Released	
30 June 2023	LB	(England) Jack Robinson	(England) Carlisle United	Free Transfer	
30 June 2023	GK	(England) Oliver Swan	Free agent	Released	
30 June 2023	RB	(England) Tylah Wallace-Ming	Free agent	Released	
3 July 2023	CM	(Sierra Leone) Kamil Conteh	(England) Grimsby Town	Undisclosed	
9 July 2023	LB	(England) Marc Bola	(Turkey) Samsunspor	Undisclosed	
16 August 2023	CF	(England) Chuba Akpom	(Netherlands) Ajax	Undisclosed	
1 September 2023	CM	(Argentina) Martín Payero	(Italy) Udinese	Undisclosed	
1 February 2024	CF	(Republic of Ireland) Calum Kavanagh	(England) Bradford City	Undisclosed	
1 February 2024	LW	(England) Morgan Rogers	(England) Aston Villa	Undisclosed	
12 February 2024	AM	(England) Matt Crooks	(United States) Real Salt Lake	Undisclosed	

=== Loaned in ===
Date	Pos	Player	Loaned from	Until	Ref
31 August 2023	AM	(England) Sam Greenwood	(England) Leeds United	End of season	
31 August 2023	CM	(England) Lewis O'Brien	(England) Nottingham Forest	End of season	
10 January 2024	RB	(England) Luke Ayling	(England) Leeds United	End of season	
26 January 2024	LB	(England) Luke Thomas	(England) Leicester City	End of season	

=== Loaned out ===
Date	Pos	Player	Loaned to	Fee	Ref
1 July 2023	GK	(England) Zach Hemming	(Scotland) St Mirren	End of season	
10 July 2023	GK	(England) Sol Brynn	(England) Leyton Orient	End of season	
18 July 2023	GK	(England) Liam Roberts	(England) Barnsley	End of season	
3 August 2023	CF	(United States) Matthew Hoppe	(United States) San Jose Earthquakes	End of season	
18 August 2023	GK	(Scotland) Max Metcalfe	(England) AFC Fylde	10 November 2023	
25 August 2023	CM	(England) Jack Stott	(England) York City	1 January 2024	
1 September 2023	RM	(England) Jeremy Sivi	(England) Harrogate Town	End of season (Note: On 10 January 2024, Sivi's loan at Harrogate was extended until the end of season.)	
30 September 2023	CB	(England) Jack Hannah	(England) Darlington	28 October 2023	
13 October 2023	RB	(England) Terrell Agyemang	(England) Hartlepool United	11 November 2023	
6 December 2023	RB	(Kenya) George Gitau	(England) Marske United	3 January 2024	
8 January 2024	LB	(England) Hayden Coulson	(England) Blackpool	End of season	
10 January 2024	CM	(England) Jack Stott	(England) Gateshead	End of season	
1 February 2024	LB	(England) Bryant Bilongo	(England) Ebbsfleet United	End of season	
1 March 2024	RB	(England) Terrell Agyemang	(England) Hartlepool United	End of season	
7 March 2024	CF	(England) Daniel Nkrumah	(England) Dagenham & Redbridge	End of season	
8 March 2024	RW	(England) Max Howells	(England) Whitby Town	6 April 2024	
12 March 2024	RM	(England) Joe Gibson	(England) Darlington	9 April 2024	

== Pre-season and friendlies ==
On June 1, Boro announced two pre-season friendlies, against Hartlepool United and York City. Five days later, a third fixture was added, against Rotherham United. A fourth pre-season friendly was announced, at home against Auxerre. A trip to Bradford City was also confirmed as a fifth pre-season match. A sixth and final friendly was confirmed, against Real Betis.

Win Draw Loss Fixtures

8 July 2023 Friendly	Vitória de Guimarães	0–1	Middlesbrough	Portugal
14:00 WEST; 14:00 BST		Report	Forss	Attendance: 0 (Behind closed doors)

14 July 2023 Friendly	Hartlepool United	2–1	Middlesbrough	Hartlepool
19:00 BST	Dieseruvwe 24'; Ferguson 28'	Report	Matthews 90+2'	Stadium: Suit Direct Stadium

15 July 2023 Friendly	York City	0–0	Middlesbrough	Huntington
13:00 BST		Report		Stadium: LNER Community Stadium; Attendance: 4,958 (2,185 Boro)

19 July 2023 Friendly	Rotherham United	0–2	Middlesbrough	Rotherham
19:00 BST		Report	Silvera 6'; Gilbert 88'	Stadium: AESSEAL New York Stadium; Attendance: 2,017 (489 Boro)

22 July 2023 Friendly	Middlesbrough	0–1	Real Betis	Chesterfield
14:00 BST		Report	Pérez 63'	Stadium: SMH Group Stadium

26 July 2023 Friendly	Bradford City	3–3	Middlesbrough	Bradford
19:30 BST	Cook 12', 41'; Platt 58'	Report	Silvera 4'; Gilbert 29' (pen.); Nkrumah 90'	Stadium: University of Bradford Stadium; Attendance: 4,378 (1,413 Boro fans)

29 July 2023 Friendly	Middlesbrough	2–2	Auxerre	Middlesbrough
15:00 BST	Hackney 90'; Rogers 90+4'	Report	Sinayoko 39' (pen.); Camara 80'	Stadium: Riverside Stadium; Attendance: 9,107

== Competitions ==
=== Overall record ===
Competition	First match	Last match	Starting round	Final position	Record							
Competition	First match	Last match	Starting round	Final position	Pld	W	D	L	GF	GA	GD	Win %
Championship	5 August 2023	4 May 2024	Matchday 1	8th	46	20	9	17	71	62	+9	43.48
FA Cup	6 January 2024		Third round	Third round	1	0	0	1	0	1	−1	0.00
EFL Cup	8 August 2023	23 January 2024	First round	Semi-finals	7	6	0	1	16	11	+5	85.71
Total					54	26	9	19	87	74	+13	48.15

Source: Soccerway

=== Championship ===
==== League table ====
Pos	Team	Pld	W	D	L	GF	GA	GD	Pts	Promotion, qualification or relegation
5	West Bromwich Albion	46	21	12	13	70	47	+23	75	Qualified for the Championship play-offs
6	Norwich City	46	21	10	15	79	64	+15	73	Qualified for the Championship play-offs
7	Hull City	46	19	13	14	68	60	+8	70	
8	Middlesbrough	46	20	9	17	71	62	+9	69	
9	Coventry City	46	17	13	16	70	59	+11	64	
10	Preston North End	46	18	9	19	56	67	−11	63	
11	Bristol City	46	17	11	18	53	51	+2	62	

Source: EFL official website
Rules for classification: 1) Points; 2) Goal difference; 3) Number of goals scored; 4) Head-to-head results; 5) Wins; 6) Away goals; 7) Penalty points (sec 9.5); 8) Number of 12-point sending off offences; 9) Play-off (only if needed to determine promotion/relegation)

==== Results summary ====
Overall								Home						Away					
Pld	W	D	L	GF	GA	GD	Pts	W	D	L	GF	GA	GD	W	D	L	GF	GA	GD
46	20	9	17	71	62	+9	69	10	4	9	30	26	+4	10	5	8	41	36	+5

Source: Soccerway

==== Results by round ====
Round	1	2	3	4	5	6	7	8	9	10	11	12	13	14	15	16	17	18	19	20	21	22	23	24	25	26	27	28	30	31	32	33	34	35	36	37	29^{1}	38	39	40	41	42	43	44	45	46
Ground	H	A	H	A	H	A	A	H	A	H	A	H	A	H	A	H	A	H	A	H	H	A	H	A	A	H	A	H	H	H	A	A	H	A	H	A	A	H	A	H	H	A	A	H	A	H
Result	L	L	D	L	L	L	D	W	W	W	W	W	W	L	D	W	L	W	L	L	L	W	W	L	W	L	W	D	D	L	L	W	L	L	W	W	W	D	D	W	W	D	D	L	W	W
Position	21	24	23	22	24	24	24	22	21	17	16	13	9	10	12	10	12	10	12	12	13	13	11	14	9	12	10	11	12	12	13	13	13	14	12	11	9	10	10	10	8	9	9	9	8	8

Source: Soccerway
A = Away; H = Home; W = Win; D = Draw; L = Loss; P = Postponed
Notes:
- ^{1} Matchday 29 (vs Birmingham City) was postponed due to Birmingham's FA Cup involvements.

==== Matches ====
On 22 June, the EFL Championship fixtures were released.

Win Draw Loss Fixtures

5 August 2023 1	Middlesbrough	0–1	Millwall	Middlesbrough
15:00 BST	Howson (yellow card) 80'	Report	Bryan (yellow card) 25'; Nisbet (yellow card) 46'; Esse 73'; Cooper (yellow card) 80'	Stadium: Riverside Stadium; Attendance: 29,359; Referee: Gavin Ward

12 August 2023 2	Coventry City	3–0	Middlesbrough	Coventry
12:30 BST	Godden 11'; Latibeaudiere (yellow card) 47'; Wright 70'; Lenihan 90+1' (o.g.)	Report	Hackney (yellow card) 81'	Stadium: Coventry Building Society Arena; Attendance: 24,080; Referee: Dean Whitestone
Note: Live on Sky Sports

19 August 2023 3	Middlesbrough	1–1	Huddersfield Town	Middlesbrough
15:00 BST	Hackney 61'; Howson (yellow card) 90+5'	Report	Hogg (yellow card) 5'; Rudoni (yellow card) 45+1'; Fry 47' (o.g.); Burgzorg (yellow card) 87'	Stadium: Riverside Stadium; Attendance: 26,257; Referee: Josh Smith

26 August 2023 4	West Bromwich Albion	4–2	Middlesbrough	West Bromwich
15:00 BST	Kipré 22'; Swift 28'; Thomas-Asante 47'; Ajayi (yellow card) 74'; Sarmiento 90+1' (yellow card) 90+4'	Report	Latte Lath 29'; Smith (yellow card) 32' (yellow-red card) 51'; Rogers (yellow card) 44'; Forss 85' (pen.)	Stadium: The Hawthorns; Attendance: 23,691; Referee: Jeremy Simpson

2 September 2023 5	Middlesbrough	0–2	Queens Park Rangers	Middlesbrough
15:00 BST	Greenwood (yellow card) 77'	Report	Dozzell 43'; Colback (yellow card) 50' (goal) 71'; Chair (yellow card) 65'	Stadium: Riverside Stadium; Attendance: 25,671; Referee: Thomas Bramall

16 September 2023 6	Blackburn Rovers	2–1	Middlesbrough	Blackburn
15:00 BST	Carter (yellow card) 28'; Szmodics 31', 49'	Report	Lenihan (yellow card) 40'; Crooks 55'; Hackney (yellow card) 88'	Stadium: Ewood Park; Attendance: 16,348; Referee: James Bell

19 September 2023 7	Sheffield Wednesday	1–1	Middlesbrough	Sheffield
20:00 BST	Windass (yellow card) 31'; Musaba 38'	Report	Jones (yellow card) 48'; Lenihan 53'	Stadium: Hillsborough; Attendance: 22,975; Referee: David Webb
Note: Live on Sky Sports

23 September 2023 8	Middlesbrough	2–1	Southampton	Middlesbrough
15:00 BST	McGree 44'; Jones (yellow card) 53'; Hackney (yellow card) 58'; Howson 66' (pen.); Smith (yellow card) 90+6'	Report	Armstrong 17'	Stadium: Riverside Stadium; Attendance: 26,142; Referee: Tim Robinson

30 September 2023 9	Watford	2–3	Middlesbrough	Watford
15:00 BST	Bayo 19'; Porteous (yellow card) 40'; Hoedt 52'; Sierralta (yellow card) 55'; Smith (yellow card) 90+6'	Report	McGree 5', 12'; Coburn 63'	Stadium: Vicarage Road; Attendance: 18,446; Referee: Oliver Langford

3 October 2023 10	Middlesbrough	2–0	Cardiff City	Middlesbrough
19:45 BST	Jones 56'; Greenwood (yellow card) 75'; Latte Lath 84'	Report	Grant (yellow card) 32'; Ng (yellow card) 36'; Goutas (yellow card) 80'	Stadium: Riverside Stadium; Attendance: 24,276; Referee: Andrew Madley

7 October 2023 11	Sunderland	0–4	Middlesbrough	Sunderland
12:30 BST	Neil (yellow card) 17' (yellow-red card) 45+4'; Ballard (yellow card) 45+5'; Roberts (yellow card) 70'; Clarke (yellow card) 73'	Report	Greenwood 58'; Crooks 60'; Jones 72' (yellow card) 32'; Forss 90'; Coburn (yellow card) 45+5'	Stadium: Stadium of Light; Attendance: 43,584; Referee: Jarred Gillet

21 October 2023 12	Middlesbrough	1–0	Birmingham City	Middlesbrough
15:00 BST	Rogers 89'; Crooks (yellow card) 26'; Engel (yellow card) 30'; Hackney (yellow card) 58'	Report	Bielik (yellow card) 40'; Ruddy (yellow card) 45+4'; Longelo (yellow card) 71'	Stadium: Riverside Stadium; Attendance: 28,449; Referee: Rebecca Welch

24 October 2023 13	Norwich City	1–2	Middlesbrough	Norwich
19:45 BST	Sara (yellow card) 76'; Rowe (yellow card) 90+5' (goal) 90+9'	Report	Greenwood 46'; Hackney (yellow card) 89'; Silvera 90+2'; Dieng (yellow card) 90+4'	Stadium: Carrow Road; Attendance: 25,585; Referee: Simon Hooper

28 October 2023 14	Middlesbrough	0–2	Stoke City	Middlesbrough
15:00 BST	McNair (yellow card) 53'; Van den Berg (yellow card) 57'	Report	Rose 8'; Léris 37'; Thompson (yellow card) 69'; Stevens (yellow card) 90+2'	Stadium: Riverside Stadium; Attendance: 26,732; Referee: Andrew Kitchen

4 November 2023 15	Plymouth Argyle	3–3	Middlesbrough	Plymouth
15:00 GMT	Mumba 34'; Azaz 38'; Miller (yellow card) 70'; Cundle (yellow card) 72'; Whittaker 77'	Report	Coburn 23' (penalty missed) 60' 60' (yellow card) 62'; Crooks (yellow card) 30'; Greenwood 64'; van den Berg (yellow card) 66'	Stadium: Home Park; Attendance: 16,471; Referee: Darren England

11 November 2023 16	Middlesbrough	1–0	Leicester City	Middlesbrough
15:00 BST	Crooks (yellow card) 42'; Greenwood 83'; Howson (yellow card) 85'; Jones (yellow card) 88'; Rogers (yellow card) 90+3'	Report	Vestergaard (yellow card) 12'; Winks (yellow card) 43'; Choudhury (yellow card) 82'	Stadium: Riverside Stadium; Attendance: 30,042; Referee: Oliver Langford

25 November 2023 17	Bristol City	3–2	Middlesbrough	Bristol
15:00 BST	Gardner-Hickman 37', (yellow card) 42'; Conway 45+1' (pen.); Sykes 67'; Pring (yellow card) 77'	Report	Fry (yellow card) 44'; Vyner 50' (o.g.); Crooks 52'; Greenwood (yellow card) 63'	Stadium: Ashton Gate; Attendance: 21,694; Referee: John Busby

28 November 2023 18	Middlesbrough	4–0	Preston North End	Middlesbrough
19:45 BST	Jones 16', 37'; van den Berg 26'; Bangura 90+4'	Report	Potts (yellow card) 65'; Hughes (yellow card) 82'	Stadium: Riverside Stadium; Attendance: 24,502; Referee: Andrew Kitchen

2 December 2023 19	Leeds United	3–2	Middlesbrough	Leeds
15:00 BST	James 5' (yellow card) 45+6'; Summerville 7'; Piroe 38' (pen.); Rutter (yellow card) 41'	Report	Latte Lath 3', 45'; Clarke (yellow card) 37'; Howson (yellow card) 37'; Dijksteel (yellow card) 45+5' (yellow-red card) 63'; Crooks (yellow card) 67'; Rogers (yellow card) 83'	Stadium: Elland Road; Attendance: 36,812; Referee: Darren England

9 December 2023 20	Middlesbrough	0–2	Ipswich Town	Middlesbrough
15:00 BST	Crooks (yellow card) 51'	Report	Chaplin 36'; Woolfenden (yellow card) 63'; Hutchinson 67'; Ball (yellow card) 90'; Morsy (yellow card) 90+5'	Stadium: Riverside Stadium; Attendance: 27,960; Referee: Dean Whitestone

13 December 2023 21	Middlesbrough	1–2	Hull City	Middlesbrough
19:45 BST	Latte Lath 6'	Report	Coyle (yellow card) 65'; Delap 69'; Tufan 82'	Stadium: Riverside Stadium; Attendance: 24,158; Referee: Oliver Langford

16 December 2023 22	Swansea City	1–2	Middlesbrough	Swansea
15:00 BST	Lowe 59'; Tymon (yellow card) 62'; Paterson (yellow card) 65'	Report	Greenwood 43'; Howson (yellow card) 64'; Jones (yellow card) 67'; Silvera 78'; Latte Lath (yellow card) 90+5'	Stadium: Swansea.com Stadium; Attendance: 15,084; Referee: James Bell

23 December 2023 23	Middlesbrough	1–0	West Bromwich Albion	Middlesbrough
15:00 BST	Rogers 40'; Howson (yellow card) 52'	Report	Kipré (yellow card) 15'; Furlong (yellow card) 65'	Stadium: Riverside Stadium; Attendance: 29,145; Referee: James Linington

26 December 2023 24	Rotherham United	1–0	Middlesbrough	Rotherham
15:00 BST	Bramall 72'	Report		Stadium: AESSEAL New York Stadium; Attendance: 11,487; Referee: Andrew Kitchen

29 December 2023 25	Huddersfield Town	1–2	Middlesbrough	Huddersfield
19:45 BST	Helik 60'	Report	Rogers (yellow card) 32'; Coburn 54'; Bangura (yellow card) 69'; Howson 84'	Stadium: John Smith's Stadium; Attendance: 20,045; Referee: Ben Toner

1 January 2024 26	Middlesbrough	1–3	Coventry City	Middlesbrough
15:00 GMT	Coburn 31'; Greenwood (yellow card) 67'; Rogers (yellow card) 90+1'	Report	Sakamoto 34', 69'; Wright 58', (yellow card) 82'; Eccles (yellow card) 65'	Stadium: Riverside Stadium; Attendance: 28,409; Referee: David Webb

13 January 2024 27	Millwall	1–3	Middlesbrough	Bermondsey
15:00 GMT	Bryan 10', (yellow card) 80'; Honeyman (yellow card) 49'; Longman (yellow card) 51'	Report	Engel 38', (yellow card) 66'; Jones 58'; Forss 90+5'	Stadium: The Den; Attendance: 16,681; Referee: Andy Davies

20 January 2024 28	Middlesbrough	1–1	Rotherham United	Middlesbrough
15:00 GMT	Hackney (yellow card) 46'; Forss 82'	Report	Morrison (yellow card) 40'; Cafú 59'; Johansson (yellow card) 69'; Clucas (yellow card) 73'	Stadium: Riverside Stadium; Attendance: 26,140; Referee: Darren Bond

4 February 2024 30	Middlesbrough	1–1	Sunderland	Middlesbrough
12:00 GMT	Engel (yellow card) 34'; Forss 61'; Greenwood (yellow card) 75'; Ayling (yellow card) 79'	Report	Hume (yellow card) 14'; Ba (yellow card) 34'; Rusyn 83'; Ekwah (yellow card) 90+2'	Stadium: Riverside Stadium; Attendance: 31,716; Referee: Darren England
Note: Fixture was previously scheduled for 3 February, but was moved for live TV coverage.

10 February 2024 31	Middlesbrough	1–2	Bristol City	Middlesbrough
15:00 GMT	Barlaser (yellow card) 73'; Silvera 90+1'	Report	Knight 16'; James 17'	Stadium: Riverside Stadium; Attendance: 24,881; Referee: Sam Allison

14 February 2024 32	Preston North End	2–1	Middlesbrough	Preston
19:45 GMT	Millar 23'; Riis Jakobsen 60'; Storey (yellow card) 86'; Browne (yellow card) 90+2'	Report	Azaz 57'; McGree (yellow card) 90+6'	Stadium: Deepdale; Attendance: 15,282; Referee: Tony Harrington

17 February 2024 33	Leicester City	1–2	Middlesbrough	Leicester
15:00 GMT	Faes (yellow card) 60'; Vardy 85'	Report	Clarke (yellow card) 3'; Azaz 24'; Silvera 37'; Glover (yellow card) 59'; McGree (yellow card) 73'; Ayling (yellow card) 81'	Stadium: King Power Stadium; Attendance: 31,487; Referee: Chris Kavanagh

24 February 2024 34	Middlesbrough	0–2	Plymouth Argyle	Middlesbrough
15:00 GMT	Ayling (yellow card) 37'	Report	Sorinola 7'; Miller (yellow card) 26'; Hardie 31'	Stadium: Riverside Stadium; Attendance: 25,578; Referee: Sunny Sukhvir Gill

2 March 2024 35	Stoke City	2–0	Middlesbrough	Stoke-on-Trent
15:00 GMT	Bae Jun-ho 40'; Laurent (yellow card) 46'; Wilmot (yellow card) 51'; Ennis (yellow card) 62'; Baker 71'	Report	Latte Lath (yellow card) 51'	Stadium: bet365 Stadium; Attendance: 21,673; Referee: John Busby

6 March 2024 36	Middlesbrough	3–1	Norwich City	Middlesbrough
19:45 GMT	Forss (yellow card) 20', (goal) 37'; Latte Lath 43'; Engel 62'	Report	Barnes 17'; Sainz (red card) 30'; McLean (yellow card) 47'	Stadium: Riverside Stadium; Attendance: 23,545; Referee: Robert Madley

9 March 2024 37	Queens Park Rangers	0–2	Middlesbrough	Shepherd's Bush
15:00 GMT	Hayden (yellow card) 64'; Clarke-Salter (yellow card) 81'	Report	Forss (yellow card) 39', (goal) 76'; Latte Lath 64'; Engel (yellow card) 66'; Ayling (yellow card) 81'; Dieng (yellow card) 90+2'; McNair (yellow card) 90+4'	Stadium: MATRADE Loftus Road; Attendance: 16,689; Referee: Leigh Doughty

12 March 2024 29	Birmingham City	0–1	Middlesbrough	Bordesley
19:45 GMT		Report	McGree 17'; Howson (yellow card) 23'; Latte Lath (yellow card) 90+8'	Stadium: St Andrew's Stadium; Attendance: 17,829; Referee: Andy Davies
Note: Fixture was originally scheduled for 27 January, but was postponed due to Birmingham's FA Cup involvement.

16 March 2024 38	Middlesbrough	0–0	Blackburn Rovers	Middlesbrough
15:00 GMT	Latte Lath (yellow card) 31'; Ayling (yellow card) 57'; Greenwood (yellow card) 90'	Report	Wharton (yellow card) 31'; Hedges (yellow card) 81'; Ayari (yellow card) 89'	Stadium: Riverside Stadium; Attendance: 25,554; Referee: Keith Stroud

29 March 2024 39	Southampton	1–1	Middlesbrough	Southampton
15:00 GMT	A. Armstrong 12'; Downes (yellow card) 34'; S. Armstrong (yellow card) 83'	Report	Latte Lath (yellow card) 50', (goal) 90'; Jones (yellow card) 50'; Azaz (yellow card) 62'; O'Brien (yellow card) 70'	Stadium: St Mary's Stadium; Attendance: 30,470; Referee: Matt Donohue

1 April 2024 40	Middlesbrough	2–0	Sheffield Wednesday	Middlesbrough
15:00 BST	Greenwood (yellow card) 24' (penalty missed) 81'; Ihiekwe 41' (o.g.); Jones 73'	Report	Vaulks (yellow card) 33'; Beadle (yellow card) 40'; Famewo (yellow card) 79'; Iorfa (yellow card) 80'	Stadium: Riverside Stadium; Attendance: 27,893; Referee: Tom Nield

6 April 2024 41	Middlesbrough	2–0	Swansea City	Middlesbrough
15:00 BST	Latte Lath 45+1', 79'; Ayling (yellow card) 81'; Barlaser (yellow card) 84'	Report	Cooper (yellow card) 78'; Cullen (yellow card) 86'	Stadium: Riverside Stadium; Attendance: 24,780; Referee: Rebecca Welch

10 April 2024 42	Hull City	2–2	Middlesbrough	Kingston upon Hull
19:45 BST	Philogene 29', (yellow card) 90+1'; Seri 41'; Giles (yellow card) 84'; Carvalho (yellow card) 86'	Report	Latte Lath 4'; Azaz 71'	Stadium: MKM Stadium; Attendance: 21,934; Referee: Gavin Ward

13 April 2024 43	Ipswich Town	1–1	Middlesbrough	Ipswich
15:00 BST	Luongo 30', (yellow card) 49'; Travis (yellow card) 90+5'	Report	Latte Lath 20'; Howson (yellow card) 57'; Ayling (yellow card) 90+3'	Stadium: Portman Road; Attendance: 28,771; Referee: Sam Allison

22 April 2024 44	Middlesbrough	3–4	Leeds United	Middlesbrough
20:00 BST	Jones 7', (yellow card) 78'; Latte Lath 30', (yellow card) 35', (goal) 87'; Howson (yellow card) 80'	Report	Summerville 14' (pen.), 61'; Bamford 18', (yellow card) 45+1'; Gnonto 39'	Stadium: Riverside Stadium; Attendance: 29,333; Referee: Tony Harrington
Note: Fixture was initially scheduled for 20 April, but was moved for live Sky Sports coverage.

27 April 2024 45	Cardiff City	1–4	Middlesbrough	Leckwith
15:00 BST	Bowler 90+1'	Report	Clarke 45'; Azaz 49'; Latte Lath 56'; Gilbert 60'	Stadium: Cardiff City Stadium; Attendance: 22,999; Referee: Jeremy Simpson

4 May 2024 46	Middlesbrough	3–1	Watford	Middlesbrough
12:30 BST	Latte Lath 28'; Azaz (yellow card) 33'; Bangura 78'; Jones 84'	Report	Pollock (yellow card) 20'; Hoedt 71'	Stadium: Riverside Stadium; Attendance: 28,289; Referee: Keith Stroud

=== FA Cup ===
As a Championship club, Boro entered into the competition at the third round stage, and were drawn at home to Aston Villa.

Win Draw Loss Fixtures

6 January 2023 Third round	Middlesbrough	0–1	Aston Villa	Middlesbrough
17:30 GMT	Jones (yellow card) 23'	Report	Konsa (yellow card) 37'; Bailey (yellow card) 40'; Cash (yellow card) 74', (goal) 87'; Zaniolo (yellow card) 80'; Lenglet (yellow card) 82'	Stadium: Riverside Stadium; Attendance: 25,022; Referee: Robert Jones

=== EFL Cup ===
Middlesbrough were drawn away to Huddersfield Town in the first round, Bolton Wanderers in the second round, Bradford City in the third round, Exeter City in the fourth round and Port Vale in the quarter-finals and then against Chelsea in a Two-legged tie, first at home and second away.

Win Draw Loss Fixtures

8 August 2023 First round	Huddersfield Town	2–3	Middlesbrough	Huddersfield
19:00 BST	Harratt 4'; Headley (red card) 13'; Hudlin 90+4'; Ayina (yellow card) 90+5'	Report	Payero (yellow card) 19'; Silvera 20'; I. Jones 63'; McGree 82'; Crooks (yellow card) 90+6'	Stadium: Kirklees Stadium; Attendance: 8,057; Referee: Oliver Langford

29 August 2023 Second round	Bolton Wanderers	1–3	Middlesbrough	Bolton
19:45 BST	Charles 23'; Forrester (yellow card) 51'; Thomason (yellow card) 58'; Iredale (yellow card) 70'; Ashworth (yellow card) 90+2'	Report	Crooks 33', (yellow card) 48'; I. Jones (yellow card) 47'; McGree 90+1'; Rogers 90+4'	Stadium: Toughsheet Community Stadium; Attendance: 8,624; Referee: Stephen Martin

26 September 2023 Third round	Bradford City	0–2	Middlesbrough	Bradford
19:45 BST	Walker (yellow card) 38'; Pattison (yellow card) 89'	Report	Latte Lath 21'; Rogers 54'; Smith (yellow card) 85'	Stadium: Valley Parade; Attendance: 15,754; Referee: Tom Nield

31 October 2023 Fourth round	Exeter City	2–3	Middlesbrough	Exeter
19:45 GMT	Trevitt 13', 66', (yellow card) 37'; Diabate (yellow card) 68'; Kite (yellow card) 75'	Report	Silvera (yellow card) 44', (goal) 59'; Rogers 49', (yellow card) 75'; Latte Lath 82' (pen.), (yellow card) 83'	Stadium: St James Park; Attendance: 7,601; Referee: Graham Scott

19 December 2023 Quarter-finals	Port Vale	0–3	Middlesbrough	Stoke-on-Trent
19:45 GMT	Balmer (yellow card) 50'; Loft (yellow card) 60'; Iacovitti (yellow card) 80'	Report	Clarke (yellow card) 4'; Rogers (yellow card) 10', (goal) 23'; Howson 11'; Crooks 53'	Stadium: Vale Park; Attendance: 12,006; Referee: Michael Salisbury

9 January 2024 Semi-final First leg	Middlesbrough	1–0	Chelsea	Middlesbrough
20:00 GMT	Hackney 37'; I. Jones (yellow card) 90+3'	Report	Colwill (yellow card) 30'	Stadium: Riverside Stadium; Attendance: 32,097; Referee: Sam Barrott

23 January 2024 Semi-final Second leg	Chelsea	6–1 (6–2 agg.)	Middlesbrough	Fulham
20:00 GMT	Mudryk (yellow card) 12'; Howson 15' (o.g.); Fernández 29'; Disasi 36'; Palmer 42', 77'; Silva (yellow card) 53'; Madueke 81'	Report	Crooks (yellow card) 40'; Van den Berg (yellow card) 64'; Rogers 88'	Stadium: Stamford Bridge; Attendance: 37,754; Referee: John Brooks

== Statistics ==
As of 30 May 2024
Players with names in italics and marked * were on loan from another club for the whole of their season with Middlesbrough

No.	Pos	Nat	Player	Total		Championship		FA Cup		EFL Cup	
No.	Pos	Nat	Player	Apps	Goals	Apps	Goals	Apps	Goals	Apps	Goals
1	GK	(Senegal) SEN	Seny Dieng	35	0	35+0	0	0+0	0	0+0	0
2	DF	(England) ENG	Tommy Smith	7	0	4+2	0	0+0	0	1+0	0
3	DF	(Netherlands) NED	Rav van den Berg	39	1	33+1	1	1+0	0	3+1	0
4	MF	(England) ENG	Daniel Barlaser	41	0	26+7	0	1+0	0	7+0	0
5	DF	(England) ENG	Matt Clarke	28	1	19+5	1	1+0	0	2+1	0
6	DF	(England) ENG	Dael Fry	35	0	28+0	0	0+1	0	6+0	0
7	MF	(England) ENG	Hayden Hackney	28	2	20+1	1	1+0	0	6+0	1
8	MF	(Australia) AUS	Riley McGree	25	6	14+8	4	0+0	0	1+2	2
9	FW	(Ivory Coast) CIV	Emmanuel Latte Lath	36	18	23+7	16	0+1	0	5+0	2
11	MF	(England) ENG	Isaiah Jones	41	9	31+4	8	1+0	0	4+1	1
12	DF	(England) ENG	Luke Ayling*	19	0	19+0	0	0+0	0	0+0	0
14	MF	(England) ENG	Alex Gilbert	15	1	2+10	1	0+1	0	0+2	0
15	DF	(Netherlands) NED	Anfernee Dijksteel	23	0	8+12	0	0+0	0	2+1	0
16	MF	(England) ENG	Jonny Howson	43	3	35+3	2	0+1	0	3+1	1
17	DF	(Northern Ireland) NIR	Paddy McNair	25	0	20+1	0	0+0	0	4+0	0
18	FW	(Australia) AUS	Samuel Silvera	42	6	12+25	4	0+0	0	4+1	2
19	FW	(England) ENG	Josh Coburn	25	5	11+10	5	1+0	0	0+3	0
20	MF	(Republic of Ireland) IRL	Finn Azaz	20	4	15+5	4	0+0	0	0+0	0
21	FW	(Finland) FIN	Marcus Forss	23	7	12+9	7	0+0	0	2+0	0
23	GK	(Australia) AUS	Tom Glover	20	0	11+1	0	1+0	0	7+0	0
24	DF	(Sierra Leone) SLE	Alex Bangura	18	2	6+8	2	1+0	0	2+1	0
26	DF	(Republic of Ireland) IRL	Darragh Lenihan	10	1	8+0	1	0+0	0	2+0	0
27	DF	(Denmark) DEN	Lukas Engel	41	2	28+7	2	1+0	0	4+1	0
28	MF	(England) ENG	Lewis O'Brien*	25	0	18+5	0	0+0	0	1+1	0
29	MF	(England) ENG	Sam Greenwood*	38	5	25+12	5	1+0	0	0+0	0
33	DF	(England) ENG	Luke Thomas*	12	0	8+4	0	0+0	0	0+0	0
48	FW	(England) ENG	Charlie Lennon	1	0	0+1	0	0+0	0	0+0	0
49	MF	(England) ENG	Law McCabe	4	0	1+2	0	0+0	0	0+1	0
50	MF	(England) ENG	Fin Cartwright	1	0	0+0	0	0+0	0	0+1	0
53	FW	(England) ENG	Ajay Matthews	2	0	0+2	0	0+0	0	0+0	0
56	DF	(England) ENG	James Wilson	1	0	0+1	0	0+0	0	0+0	0
64	FW	(England) ENG	Sonny Finch	1	0	0+1	0	0+0	0	0+0	0
Out on loan
22	DF	(England) ENG	Hayden Coulson	4	0	2+0	0	0+1	0	1+0	0
No longer at the club
10	FW	(England) ENG	Morgan Rogers	33	7	14+12	2	1+0	0	5+1	5
20	MF	(Argentina) ARG	Martín Payero	1	0	0+0	0	0+0	0	1+0	0
25	MF	(England) ENG	Matt Crooks	31	5	18+7	3	0+0	0	4+2	2
48	FW	(Republic of Ireland) IRL	Calum Kavanagh	3	0	0+2	0	0+0	0	0+1	0
