= Rav van den Berg =

Dutch footballer (born 2004)

Personal information
- Full name: Rav Wiebe van den Berg
- Date of birth: 7 July 2004 (age 22)
- Place of birth: Zwolle, Netherlands
- Height: 1.90 m (6 ft 3 in)
- Positions: Centre-back; right-back

Team information
- Current team: 1. FC Köln
- Number: 33

Youth career
- 2019–2021: PEC Zwolle

Senior career*
Years	Team	Apps	(Gls)
2021–2023	PEC Zwolle	28	(0)
2023–2025	Middlesbrough	61	(1)
2025–	1. FC Köln	14	(0)

International career^{‡}
2019	Netherlands U15	1	(0)
2019–2020	Netherlands U16	3	(0)
2021	Netherlands U18	1	(0)
2022	Netherlands U19	2	(0)
2023	Netherlands U20	1	(0)
2023–	Netherlands U21	11	(1)
- * Club domestic league appearances and goals as of 19:30, 5 April 2026 (UTC) ‡ National team caps and goals as of 21:20, 27 March 2026 (UTC)

Rav Wiebe van den Berg (born 7 July 2004) is a Dutch professional footballer who plays as a centre-back or right-back for German Bundesliga club 1. FC Köln.

== Club career ==
=== PEC Zwolle ===
Van den Berg started his career at PEC Zwolle after graduating through their academy and was linked with transfers to Ajax and PSV in March 2019, aged 14. He was included in a first team training camp in Spain midway through the 2019–20 season, aged 15, before signing a two-year contract with the club in May 2020. He made his first-team debut for the club on 1 May 2021, starting in a 2–1 Eredivisie defeat to SBV Vitesse at the age of 16 years and 298 days.

=== Middlesbrough ===
On 6 July 2023, Van den Berg signed a four-year contract with Middlesbrough.

Van den Berg made his debut against Huddersfield Town in the EFL Cup in a 3–2 victory. He scored his first goal for the club on 28 November 2023 in a 4–0 win against Preston North End. At the end of the 2023–24 season, Van Den Berg was named as Middlesbrough's Player of the Season and Young Player of the Season.

=== 1. FC Köln ===
On 13 August 2025, Van den Berg joined Bundesliga club 1. FC Köln signing a five-year contract for a fee believed to be €13,000,000 (£11,200,000).

== International career ==
Van den Berg has represented the Netherlands internationally at under-15 and under-16 levels.

== Personal life ==
He is the younger brother of Brentford F.C. defender Sepp van den Berg.

== Career statistics ==
As of match played 5 April 2026

Appearances and goals by club, season and competition
Club	Season	League			National cup (Note: Includes KNVB Cup, FA Cup)		League cup (Note: Includes EFL Cup)		Other		Total	
Club	Season	Division	Apps	Goals	Apps	Goals	Apps	Goals	Apps	Goals	Apps	Goals
PEC Zwolle	2020–21	Eredivisie	1	0	0	0	—		—		1	0
PEC Zwolle	2021–22	Eredivisie	10	0	2	1	—		—		12	1
PEC Zwolle	2022–23	Eerste Divisie	17	0	2	0	—		—		19	0
PEC Zwolle	Total		28	0	4	0	—		—		32	1
Middlesbrough	2023–24	Championship	34	1	1	0	4	0	—		39	1
Middlesbrough	2024–25	Championship	27	0	0	0	0	0	—		27	0
Middlesbrough	Total		61	1	1	0	4	0	—		66	1
1. FC Köln	2025–26	Bundesliga	14	0	0	0	—		—		14	0
Career total			103	1	5	1	4	0	0	0	112	2

== Honours ==
Individual

- Middlesbrough Player of the Season: 2023–24
- Middlesbrough Young Player of the Season: 2023–24
