= Lukas Engel =

Danish footballer (born 1998)

Personal information
- Full name: Lukas Ahlefeld Engel
- Date of birth: 14 December 1998 (age 27)
- Place of birth: Kastrup, Denmark
- Height: 1.78 m (5 ft 10 in)
- Positions: Left-back; left midfielder

Team information
- Current team: Real Salt Lake
- Number: 4

Youth career
- –2015: Kastrup Boldklub

Senior career*
Years	Team	Apps	(Gls)
2015–2017	Kastrup Boldklub	48	(29)
2017–2021	Fremad Amager	89	(18)
2021–2022	Vejle	34	(4)
2022	→ Silkeborg (loan)	15	(2)
2022–2023	Silkeborg	28	(1)
2023–2026	Middlesbrough	44	(2)
2025	→ FC Cincinnati (loan)	33	(0)
2026–	Real Salt Lake	15	(1)
- * Club domestic league appearances and goals as of 19:53, 10 November 2026 (UTC)

Lukas Ahlefeld Engel (born 14 December 1998) is a Danish professional footballer who plays as a left-back or left midfielder for Major League Soccer club Real Salt Lake.

== Club career ==
He made his Danish Superliga debut for Vejle on 2 February 2021 in a game against AGF. On 31 January 2022, Engel was loaned out to Danish Superliga club Silkeborg IF for the rest of the season. On 21 June 2022, the club confirmed that they had bought Engel free from his contract with Vejle, and signed a five-year deal.

On 15 August 2023, EFL Championship side Middlesbrough announced the signing on Engel on a four-year contract. Engel made his debut for the club on 19 August, in a 1–1 draw against Huddersfield Town.

On 11 February 2025, Engel signed for Major League Soccer club FC Cincinnati on loan until the end of the 2025 MLS season.

== Career statistics ==
As of match played 23 November 2025

Appearances and goals by club, season and competition
Club	Season	League			National cup (Note: Includes Danish Cup, FA Cup)		League cup (Note: Includes EFL Cup)		Continental		Other		Total	
Club	Season	Division	Apps	Goals	Apps	Goals	Apps	Goals	Apps	Goals	Apps	Goals	Apps	Goals
Fremad Amager	2017–18	Danish 1st Division	11	0	—		—		—		—		11	0
Fremad Amager	2018–19	Danish 1st Division	32	9	—		—		—		—		32	9
Fremad Amager	2019–20	Danish 1st Division	30	5	—		—		—		—		30	5
Fremad Amager	2020–21	Danish 1st Division	16	4	1	0	—		—		—		17	4
Fremad Amager	Total		89	18	1	0	—		—		—		90	18
Vejle	2020–21	Danish Superliga	17	2	1	1	—		—		—		18	3
Vejle	2021–22	Danish Superliga	17	2	5	2	—		—		—		22	4
Vejle	Total		34	4	6	3	—		—		—		40	7
Silkeborg (loan)	2021–22	Danish Superliga	15	2	—		—		—		—		15	2
Silkeborg]	2022–23	Danish Superliga	25	1	3	0	—		7 (Note: Five appearances in UEFA Europa Conference League, two appearances in UEFA Europa League)	0	—		35	1
Silkeborg]	2023–24	Danish Superliga	3	0	—		—		—		—		3	0
Silkeborg]	Silkeborg total		43	3	3	0	—		7	0	—		53	3
Middlesbrough	2023–24	EFL Championship	35	2	1	0	5	0	—		—		41	2
Middlesbrough	2024–25	EFL Championship	9	0	1	0	2	0	—		—		12	0
Middlesbrough	Total		44	2	2	0	7	0	—		—		53	2
FC Cincinnati (loan)	2025	MLS	33	0	—		—		3 (Note: Appearances in CONCACAF Champions Cup)	0	5 (Note: Three appearances in MLS Cup playoffs, two appearances in Leagues Cup)	0	41	0
Career total			243	27	12	3	7	0	10	0	5	0	279	30
