= Daniel Nkrumah =

English footballer (born 2003)

Personal information
- Full name: Daniel Kwaku Amankwah Apraku Nkrumah
- Date of birth: 5 November 2003 (age 22)
- Place of birth: Redbridge, England
- Height: 1.75 m (5 ft 9 in)
- Position: Forward

Team information
- Current team: Maidenhead United
- Number: 9

Youth career
- –2021: Leyton Orient

Senior career*
Years	Team	Apps	(Gls)
2021–2023	Leyton Orient	3	(0)
2022–2023	→ Welling United (loan)	4	(1)
2023	→ Welling United (loan)	6	(1)
2023–2025	Middlesbrough	0	(0)
2024	→ Dagenham & Redbridge (loan)	4	(0)
2025	→ FC Halifax Town (loan)	6	(0)
2025−2026	Wealdstone	12	(1)
2026	Worthing	7	(0)
2026	→ Hampton & Richmond Borough (loan)	5	(4)
2026–	Maidenhead United	10	(2)
- * Club domestic league appearances and goals as of 20:39, 10 October 2026 (UTC)

Daniel Kwaku Amankwah Apraku Nkrumah (born 5 November 2003) is an English professional footballer who plays as a forward for Maidenhead United.

== Career ==
=== Leyton Orient ===
Nkrumah joined Leyton Orient aged eight, and progressed through the age groups before making his senior debut for Orient in the EFL Trophy in the 1–0 win at home to Southampton U21 on 14 September 2021, coming on as a first half substitute for Ruel Sotiriou. He subsequently came on as a second-half substitute for Tyrese Omotoye in Orient's next match in the tournament, the 4–0 win at Crawley Town on 5 October.

Nkrumah signed a professional contract with Orient in late September 2021. Manager Kenny Jackett said, "We felt he excelled in pre-season, and has regularly been training with the first team group. Although he's still 17-years-old, we felt he had earned a professional deal, and to continue to aid his progress in every way we can."

On 6 December 2022, Nkrumah joined National League South side Welling United on a one-month loan deal. On 23 March 2023, he returned to Welling United on loan until the end of the season.

=== Middlesbrough ===
On 15 June 2023, Nkrumah signed for Championship side Middlesbrough, an undisclosed fee being agreed to avoid a compensation payment as the player was out of contract. In March 2024, he joined National League club Dagenham & Redbridge on a one-month loan deal.

On 28 March 2025, Nkrumah joined National League side FC Halifax Town on loan for the remainder of the season.

Nkrumah was released by Middlesbrough at the end of the 2024–25 season.

=== Non-league ===
On 8 August 2025, Nkrumah signed for National League side Wealdstone. He made 13 league appearances for the club, scoring once in a 1–0 victory over Braintree Town.

On 12 January 2026, Nkrumah moved to National League South side Worthing. On 20 March 2026, he joined Hampton & Richmond Borough on loan for the remainder of the season.

Nkrumah joined Maidenhead United for the 2026-27 season.

== Personal life ==
Born in London, describing himself as a "local lad from East London", Nkrumah is of Ghanaian descent.

== Statistics ==
As of 10 October 2026

Appearances and goals by club, season and competition
Club	Season	League			FA Cup		EFL Cup		Other		Total	
Club	Season	Division	Apps	Goals	Apps	Goals	Apps	Goals	Apps	Goals	Apps	Goals
Leyton Orient	2021–22	League Two	3	0	0	0	0	0	4 (Note: Appearance(s) in EFL Trophy)	0	7	0
Leyton Orient	2022–23	League Two	0	0	0	0	0	0	0	0	0	0
Leyton Orient	Total		3	0	0	0	0	0	4	0	7	0
Welling United (loan)	2022–23	National League South	10	2	—		—		1 (Note: Appearance(s) in FA Trophy)	0	11	2
Middlesbrough	2023–24	Championship	0	0	0	0	0	0	—		0	0
Middlesbrough	2024–25	Championship	0	0	0	0	0	0	—		0	0
Middlesbrough	Total		0	0	0	0	0	0	0	0	0	0
Dagenham & Redbridge (loan)	2023–24	National League	4	0	—		—		—		4	0
FC Halifax Town (loan)	2024–25	National League	6	0	0	0	—		1 (Note: Appearance(s) in National League play-offs)	0	7	0
Wealdstone	2025–26	National League	12	1	1	0	—		3 (Note: Appearance(s) in National League Cup and FA Trophy)	1	16	2
Worthing	2025–26	National League South	7	0	0	0	—		0	0	7	0
Hampton & Richmond Borough (loan)	2025–26	National League South	5	4	0	0	—		0	0	5	4
Maidenhead United	2026–27	National League South	10	2	0	0	—		1 (Note: Appearances in Berks & Bucks Senior Cup)	2	11	4
Career total			57	9	1	0	0	0	10	3	68	12
