= Jonny Howson =

English footballer and coach (born 1988)

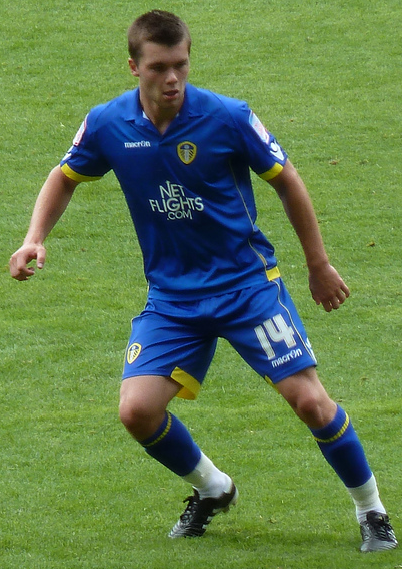
- Howson playing for Leeds United in 2010

Personal information
- Full name: Jonathan Mark Howson
- Date of birth: 21 May 1988 (age 38)
- Place of birth: Morley, West Yorkshire, England
- Height: 5 ft 11 in (1.80 m)
- Position: Defensive midfielder

Team information
- Current team: Leeds United

Youth career
- 1997–2006: Leeds United

Senior career*
Years	Team	Apps	(Gls)
2006–2012	Leeds United	185	(23)
2012–2017	Norwich City	176	(22)
2017–2025	Middlesbrough	320	(9)
2025–	Leeds United	0	(0)

International career
2011	England U21	1	(0)
- * Club domestic league appearances and goals as of 10:12, 14 May 2025 (UTC)

Jonathan Mark Howson (born 21 May 1988) is an English professional football player and coach who plays as a defensive midfielder for Premier League club Leeds United, where he also serves as a coach for the Under-21s.

He has played for three clubs: Leeds, Norwich City and Middlesbrough. Howson formerly represented and captained the England U21s.

== Club career ==
=== Leeds United ===
==== 2006–07 season ====
Howson was born in Morley, West Yorkshire and attended Bruntcliffe School. Howson came through the Leeds United academy along with James Milner, Danny Rose and Aaron Lennon and was a regular in the reserves pre-2006, scoring a number of goals at that level. On 22 August 2006, Howson was given a squad number (33) and place on the bench for the first team against Chester City in the League Cup, although he did not play. On 18 September 2006 Howson signed a three-year deal with the club.

Howson made his debut for the Leeds first team against Barnet in the League Cup on 20 September 2006. The manager who gave Howson his debut, Kevin Blackwell, was sacked immediately after the game. New manager Dennis Wise handed Howson his league debut in December in the scoreless draw against Hull City. Howson was awarded the man of the match award on his league debut. Howson scored his first professional goal in February 2007 against Norwich City. Howson and Leeds were relegated from the Championship at the end of the 2006–07 season and dropped to the English 3rd tier for the first time in Leeds' history.

==== 2007–08 season ====
Despite dropping a division, Howson remained on the fringes of the first team for the club's first ever third-tier campaign in 2007–08. He made his first league start of the season on 8 September.

The managerial appointment of Gary McAllister saw a greater emphasis placed on the club's younger players including Howson who became a regular towards the end of the season. Howson grew into his role and became more influential by the game, eventually captaining the side away to Millwall and becoming the club's youngest captain since Billy Bremner in doing so. After United narrowly missed out on an automatic promotion place, their play-off campaign would set the stage for one of Howson's finest games in a Leeds shirt. With Leeds trailing in tie after a 2–1 defeat in the first leg at Elland Road, Howson struck twice – the second a last minute winner – in a 2–0 victory at Brunton Park to send the club to their first Wembley final since 1996. Leeds lost the final 1–0 against Doncaster Rovers, with the goal coming from Howson's failure to mark goalscorer James Hayter. Nevertheless, Howson was voted Leeds' Players' Young Player and Fans' Young Player of the Year at the club's end of season awards and he was also rewarded for his form with new three-year contract, extending by a further year if Leeds win promotion to The Championship.

==== 2008–09 season ====
The following season saw high hopes for Howson but he ultimately struggled to find his form. Fabian Delph superseded him as the club's hot young prospect and the team's indifferent form put added further pressure on the young midfielder. Howson remained a regular under McAllister for the first half of the season but the Scot's underwhelming tenure was eventually ended in December after five straight defeat in the league and cup. Blackpool manager Simon Grayson succeeded McAllister and Howson was mostly restricted to substitute appearances for his first ten games. He eventually returned to the side in February, scoring both goals in Leeds' 2–0 victory over Cheltenham Town. He gradually re-established himself as a first team regular with Fabian Delph being moved out to a wide left midfield position. Howson finished the season in a permanent central midfield place alongside Neil Kilkenny and started in both of the club's two unsuccessful play-off semi-finals against Millwall.

==== 2009–10 season ====
At the beginning of Leeds' third campaign in League One, Howson was appointed the new Leeds vice-captain and due to the absence of club captain Richard Naylor, took the captaincy for the start of the season. Howson started the season well, creating a solid central midfield partnership with Michael Doyle and leading the team to nine straight wins in all competitions but he lost the armband when club captain Richard Naylor made his return from injury against Carlisle United in late September. Leeds topped the league for much of the first half of the season after an excellent star; losing only once in the league between August and January, running Premier League giants Liverpool close in a 0–1 defeat in the League Cup and reaching the third round of the FA Cup and regional final of the Football League Trophy by the start of the new year. Leeds began 2010 away to arch-rivals and Champions of England Manchester United in the FA Cup. Howson provided a fifty-yard assist for Jermaine Beckford early in the first half as the League One club caused one of the competition's greatest ever upsets and Leeds' first victory at Old Trafford in nearly thirty years in a 1–0 victory. It was the first time that the Reds had been eliminated from this stage of the competition under Alex Ferguson. Leeds faced Tottenham Hotspur in the next round three weeks later when Howson again provided a long-range pass for Beckford who won a last-minute penalty. With United trailing 2–1, Beckford grabbed the equaliser from the spot to bring Spurs back to Elland Road. Unfortunately, Tottenham won the replay 3–1 and Leeds also missed out on another Wembley appearance after losing on penalties to Carlisle United after drawing 4–4 on aggregate in the Football League Trophy regional final.

Howson scored his fourth goal of the season in the West Yorkshire derby against Huddersfield Town, with the game finishing 2–2. After beginning the year eight points clear with a game in hand at the top of the table, Leeds' league form started to falter. The club's success in the cups had placed great strain on the side having played fifty games by the beginning of March. Norwich City had overtaken them at the top and promotion rivals Swindon Town, Millwall and Huddersfield Town gained ground. United eventually fell out of the automatic promotion zone after a 3–0 defeat at home to Swindon but they recovered and went into the final game of the season versus Bristol Rovers at Elland Road simply needing a win to get promoted at the third time of asking. Howson's poor form had seen him dropped to the bench but he came on after Rovers had taken the lead. Howson quickly equalised and the goal galvanised the crowd and team. The visitors soon began making mistakes and Beckford gave Leeds the advantage soon after. Leeds held on to their 2–1 lead and secured the runners' up spot; earning promotion back to the Championship in doing so.

==== 2010–11 season ====
Howson remained an integral part of the first team as Leeds returned to the Championship. He started on the opening day of the season versus Derby County and provided an assist for Luciano Becchio to equalise early on in the game but he was unable to prevent the Whites from losing their first opening day fixture since 1989 as the Rams secured a surprise 2–1 away win. He took the captaincy for United's next game versus Lincoln City in the League Cup and he opened the scoring in a 4–0 victory in under two minutes. He gained his first league goal of the season a few weeks later in a shock 5–2 defeat to Yorkshire rivals Barnsley.

As United continued their slow start to the season, they went into their game versus Scunthorpe United on 30 October on the back of a crushing 4–0 home defeat versus Cardiff City and with Grayson's position under scrutiny. Scunthorpe cancelled out Max Gradel's early strike with an equaliser midway through the first half as the teams went into half-time at 1–1. With Howson playing in his preferred attacking midfield position, he scored a surprise fifteen-minute hat-trick during the second half as Leeds sealed a valuable 4–1 victory. This feat was made all the more remarkable as it was considered to be a 'perfect' hat-trick; consisting of three goals with left-foot and right-foot strikes as well as a header. The game proved somewhat of a catalyst for the side as it began a twelve-match unbeaten run which would last into the new year and propel United into automatic-promotion contention. Howson – thriving in a more attacking position – added a further three goals during this run in away victories over Coventry City, Burnley and a draw at home to Portsmouth.

United's impressive form continued into 2011 as Howson captained to the side to what was almost another famous FA Cup victory over Arsenal at the Emirates Stadium on 8 January. The Gunners equalised in the 90th minute through a penalty from Cesc Fàbregas after Robert Snodgrass had initially given United the lead from the spot shortly after half-time. Leeds lost the replay 3–1 at Elland Road a couple of weeks later. The month was characterised by United's familiar prudent attitude in the January transfer window as the side began to slip away. Howson helped to end a run of two wins in eight games with his ninth and tenth goals of the season in a 5–2 victory over Wembley victors Doncaster Rovers on 5 March. The month proved to be a personal success for Howson as he was nominated for and won the Football League Championship Player of the Month award. As United returned from an international break, they recorded a vital 4–1 victory over ten-men play-off rivals Nottingham Forest with Howson opening the scoring early in the second-half. The team's failure to win any of their subsequent five games would cost them a play-off spot, missing out by a point as they finished the season in seventh place. Howson ended the season with a personal best of eleven goals from midfield and he picked up the club's Young Player of the Year award.

==== 2011–12 season ====
In the summer of 2011, Howson was made permanent club captain, replacing the departed Richard Naylor. Howson's long-term midfield teammates Neil Kilkenny and Bradley Johnson also left the West Yorkshire club, with Player of the Year Max Gradel joining the exodus on the deadline day of the Summer transfer window, as Ken Bates once again emphasised the need for prudence, much to the anger of the fanbase. Howson's first game as official captain of Leeds came on the opening day of the season as Leeds suffered a 3–1 defeat against Southampton. He picked up his second career red card in the next league game versus Middlesbrough as United lost 0–1. Despite the loss of several key players and their slow start to the season, United recovered to remain competitive for much of the first half of the season; regularly stationed in the play-off zone. On 29 November, Howson scored his first goal of the season in a 4–0 away victory over Nottingham Forest in what was an emotionally charged affair, coming only two days after the death of Leeds legend Gary Speed. In the following game, Howson picked up a knee injury against Millwall in what would prove to be his last match for the club. The injury was suspected to keep Howson out of football for several months and he did not feature for his boyhood club again before he was sold to Premier League Norwich City in late January 2012.

The sale of Howson prompted protests amongst Leeds supporters; enraged by what they perceived as a lack of ambition after failure to hold on to several key players in recent seasons and minimal investment in the first team squad. United defender and Howson's long-term friend Ben Parker rejected the club's claims that midfielder wanted to leave the club at a fans forum whilst negotiations were taking place. Parker would be sent out on loan to Carlisle United shortly after and Simon Grayson, who had initially defended the sale, was sacked after criticising the club's lack of investment after a 1–4 defeat to Birmingham City on the January transfer deadline day. In total, Howson made 225 appearances for the club and scored 28 goals.

=== Norwich City ===
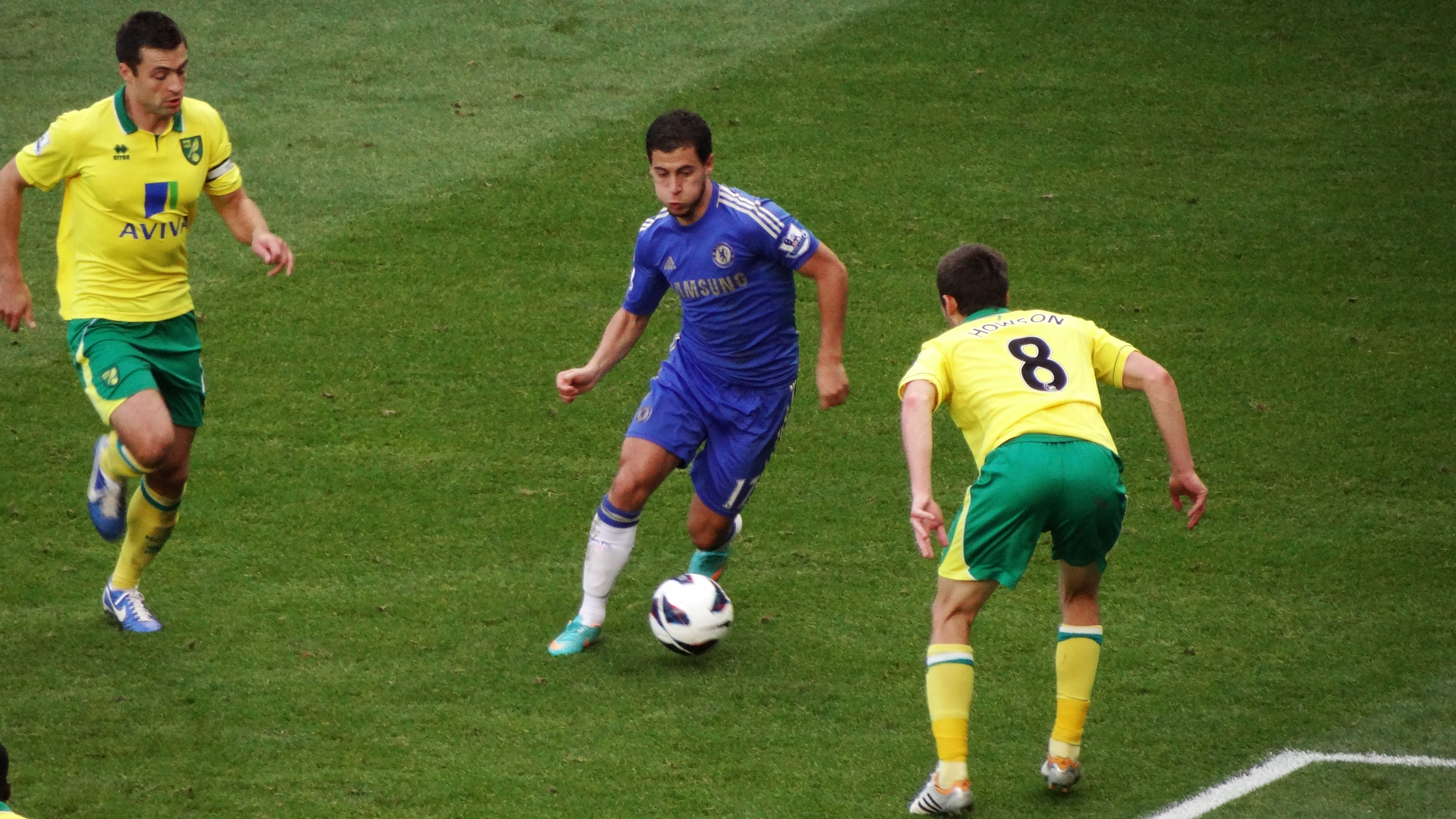
Howson (right) faces Eden Hazard, in a Premier League match between Norwich City and Chelsea in 2012

==== 2011–2014 ====
On 18 January 2012, Leeds reported that they had "reluctantly accepted" a bid from Norwich City for Howson. After agreeing terms and completing a medical, Howson was signed on 24 January and would wear shirt number 24 for the Canaries. After recovering from his knee injury, he made his Norwich debut on 3 March in a 1–0 defeat to Stoke City. He then cemented a place in the side, starting three consecutive games in March. Howson then scored his first goal for the club on 7 April in a 2–2 draw against Everton with a close-range finish. After the game, manager Paul Lambert described the performance as one of the best midfield performances that he had ever seen and likened his passing ability in the game to Barcelona and Spain midfielder Andrés Iniesta.

In the 2012–13 season, Howson played 30 Premier League games for Norwich, under manager Chris Hughton. He scored two goals in the last two games of the season, including a fine solo effort at Manchester City, as Norwich finished the campaign in 11th position in the table.

Howson again proved his capability as an attacking midfielder with a good performance away at Stoke on 29 September 2013, scoring from a long-range effort that won Norwich the match 1–0. Howson's second goal of the season came in October in a 4–1 defeat at Arsenal. The season ended in disappointment for Howson and Norwich as they were relegated to the Championship.

==== 2014–15 season ====
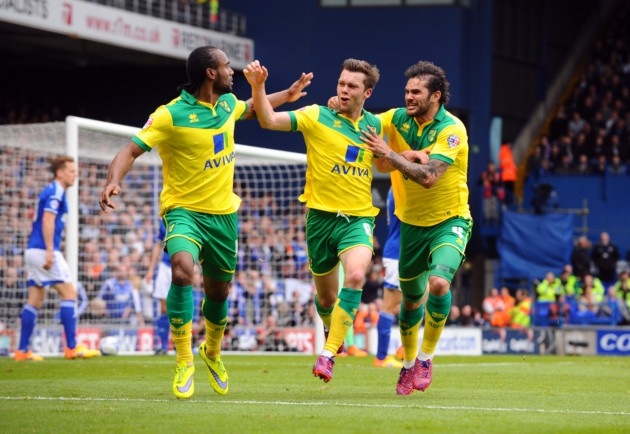
Howson celebrating his goal against rivals Ipswich Town in the first leg of the play-off semi-finals

Norwich started the 2014–15 season in good form under new manager Neil Adams. Howson's first goal of the 2014–15 campaign came in a 2–1 away loss at Nottingham Forest. Norwich's form dipped midway through the season which saw manager Neil Adams replaced by Alex Neil. Norwich's fortune turned under Neil's management as they pushed for promotion. Howson gave Norwich the lead in a 3–2 at the Valley against Charlton Athletic. Howson spurred Norwich to victory at The Den as he scored 2 goals including a 25-yard screamer in a 4–1 victory against Millwall. Norwich's good form continued as Howson scored again against Nottingham Forest in a 3–1 win at Carrow Road. Norwich moved into an automatic promotion spot as Howson scored against his former club in a 2–0 win at Leeds. Norwich narrowly missed out on automatic promotion as they finished 3rd in the league. Norwich were drawn against East Anglian rivals Ipswich Town in the semi-finals of the championship play-offs. Howson scored in the first leg of the East Anglian derby at Portman Road with the match finishing 1–1. In the return fixture Norwich secured their place in the play-off final with a 3–1 win at Carrow Road. Howson helped Norwich secure promotion back to the Premier League as the club beat Middlesbrough 2–0 in the final at Wembley Stadium. Howson finished the season with 9 goals in 39 appearances.

==== 2015–2017 ====
Howson recorded a total of 33 appearances and 3 goals in the Premier League and 35 appearances and 4 goals in all competitions. The club were relegated immediately back down to the Football League Championship at the end of the season.

Howson recorded a total of 37 appearances and scored six goals in the EFL Championship and 38 appearances and scoring six goals in all competitions.

=== Middlesbrough ===
On 7 July 2017, after much speculation, Howson signed for newly relegated EFL Championship club Middlesbrough, for an undisclosed fee, reported to be around £6 million. He made his debut on 5 August 2017, the opening day of the Championship season, in a 1–0 defeat to promotion-favoured Wolverhampton Wanderers, in which he was substituted off in the 81st minute for Rudy Gestede.

The club finished the 2017–18 season in fifth place to qualify for the play-offs, where they were defeated by Aston Villa 1–0 on aggregate. He scored twice in 41 appearances in the Championship, with 44 appearances in all competitions.

On 29 December 2023, Howson played his 300th game for Middlesbrough in a 2–1 away win over Huddersfield Town. Howson had a penalty saved but scored from the resulting corner. On 3 May 2024, Howson signed a new one-year contract with Middlesbrough. He has since left Middlesbrough upon the expiration of his contract.

=== Return to Leeds United ===
On 11 August 2025, Leeds announced Howson's return to the club in a player-coach role in the academy.

== International career ==
In March 2010, Howson was watched by England under-21 manager Stuart Pearce. On 6 February 2011, Howson received his first call-up to the squad for a friendly match against Italy. Howson made his debut during the game – a 1–0 defeat – entering the field as a 60th-minute substitute. 23 March 2011 Howson received his second call up to the Under 21s squad for the match against Denmark Under 21s.

On 3 May 2011, Howson was called up to the provisional England under-21 squad for the European Under 21 Championships. However, when the final squad was trimmed to 23 players, Howson was left out of the final line-up, although he was placed on standby for the Championships.

== Career statistics ==
As of match played 3 May 2025

Appearances and goals by club, season and competition
Club	Season	League			FA Cup		League Cup		Other		Total	
Club	Season	Division	Apps	Goals	Apps	Goals	Apps	Goals	Apps	Goals	Apps	Goals
Leeds United	2006–07	Championship	9	1	1	0	1	0	—		11	1
Leeds United	2007–08	League One	26	3	2	0	2	0	5 (Note: Two appearances in the Football League Trophy, three appearances and two goals in the League One play-offs)	2	35	5
Leeds United	2008–09	League One	40	4	3	0	4	0	4 (Note: Two appearances and a goal in the Football League Trophy, two appearances in the League One play-offs)	1	51	5
Leeds United	2009–10	League One	45	4	6	1	3	0	2 (Note: Appearances in the Football League Trophy)	0	56	5
Leeds United	2010–11	Championship	46	10	2	0	2	1	—		50	11
Leeds United	2011–12	Championship	19	1	0	0	3	0	—		22	1
Leeds United	Total		185 (Note: Soccerbase counts two play-off appearances in the 2007–08 Leeds United F.C. season as league appearances instead, which is why they have the apps totalled 187 instead of the correct figure of 185 apps the article says.)	23	14	1	15	1	11	3	225	28
Norwich City	2011–12	Premier League	11	1	0	0	—		—		11	1
Norwich City	2012–13	Premier League	30	2	1	0	2	0	—		33	2
Norwich City	2013–14	Premier League	27	2	0	0	0	0	—		27	2
Norwich City	2014–15	Championship	34	8	1	0	1	0	3 (Note: Appearances in the Championship play-offs)	1	39	9
Norwich City	2015–16	Premier League	36	3	1	0	2	1	—		39	4
Norwich City	2016–17	Championship	38	6	1	0	0	0	—		39	6
Norwich City	Total		176	22	4	0	5	1	3	1	188	24
Middlesbrough	2017–18	Championship	43	3	2	0	1	0	2	0	48	3
Middlesbrough	2018–19	Championship	46	1	1	0	0	0	—		47	1
Middlesbrough	2019–20	Championship	41	0	2	0	0	0	—		43	0
Middlesbrough	2020–21	Championship	41	1	0	0	2	0	—		43	1
Middlesbrough	2021–22	Championship	45	1	4	0	0	0	—		49	1
Middlesbrough	2022–23	Championship	45	0	1	0	0	0	—		46	0
Middlesbrough	2023–24	Championship	38	2	1	0	4	1	—		43	3
Middlesbrough	2024–25	Championship	21	1	0	0	1	0	—		22	1
Middlesbrough	Total		320	9	11	0	8	1	2	0	341	10
Career total			681	54	29	1	28	3	16	4	754	62

== Honours ==
Leeds United

- Football League One second-place promotion: 2009–10

Norwich City

- Football League Championship play-offs: 2015

Individual

- Norwich City Player of the Year: 2015–16
- North-East FWA Player of the Year: 2020
- Middlesbrough Player of the Year: 2021–22
