= Joe Gibson (footballer) =

English association football player

Personal information
- Full name: Joseph William Gibson
- Date of birth: 6 September 2001 (age 25)
- Place of birth: Chilton, England
- Position: Midfielder

Team information
- Current team: Newton Aycliffe

Youth career
- 2010–2022: Middlesbrough

Senior career*
Years	Team	Apps	(Gls)
2022–	Middlesbrough	0	(0)
2024	→ Darlington (loan)	1	(0)
2024	Whitby Town	18	(2)
2024-	Newton Aycliffe	1	(0)
- * Club domestic league appearances and goals as of 22:39, 06 December 2024 (UTC)

Joseph William Gibson (born 6 September 2001) is an English professional footballer who plays as a midfielder for Northern League Division One club Newton Aycliffe. He began his career with Middlesbrough, played for them in cup competitions but not in the league, and spent a month on loan at National League North club Darlington before being released in 2024.

== Club career ==
Gibson was born in Chilton, County Durham. He joined Middlesbrough at under-9 level, and worked his way through the youth system to sign his first professional contract in November 2019. Playing primarily at right wing-back, Gibson captained Middlesbrough's under-23 team in the 2021–22 season. He was named among the substitutes for Middlesbrough's EFL Championship match against AFC Bournemouth in December 2021, remaining unused, and made his first-team debut on 8 January 2022 in the starting eleven for an FA Cup third-round tie against Mansfield Town. According to the Teesside Live report, he "was generally full of energy and endeavour on the right hand side", beat two defenders and crossed for fellow debutant Caolan Boyd-Munce to make the score 2–0, and played for 58 minutes before being replaced by Matt Crooks in the 3–2 victory.

He signed a two-year contract in May 2022, but manager Chris Wilder thought it unlikely that any young player would make an impact in the first team in the following campaign. Gibson started in the EFL Cup defeat against Barnsley in August, but that was his last inclusion in a senior squad. He injured an ankle early in 2023, the injury required three operations, and he was out of action until February 2024.

Gibson joined National League North club Darlington on 12 March on loan for a month. He made his debut the same day, playing the last few minutes of a 2–1 win against Blyth Spartans that took his new team out of the relegation zone for the first time since August, but that was his only appearance, and he was released by Middlesbrough when his contract expired at the end of the season.

Gibson signed for Northern Premier League Premier Division club Whitby Town in August 2024.

== Career statistics ==
As of match played 16 November 2024

Appearances and goals by club, season and competition
Club	Season	League			FA Cup		EFL Cup		Other		Total	
Club	Season	Division	Apps	Goals	Apps	Goals	Apps	Goals	Apps	Goals	Apps	Goals
Middlesbrough	2021–22	Championship	0	0	1	0	0	0	—		1	0
Middlesbrough	2022–23	Championship	0	0	0	0	1	0	—		1	0
Middlesbrough	2023–24	Championship	0	0	0	0	0	0	—		0	0
Middlesbrough	Total		0	0	1	0	1	0	0	0	2	0
Darlington (loan)	2023–24	National League North	1	0	—		—		—		1	0
Whitby Town	2024–25	Northern Premier League Premier Division	18	2	2	0	—		1 (Note: Appearance in FA Trophy)	0	21	2
Career total			19	2	3	0	1	0	1	0	24	2
