= George McCormick (footballer) =

English footballer

Personal information
- Full name: George Mark McCormick
- Date of birth: 27 January 2005 (age 21)
- Place of birth: Middlesbrough, England
- Height: 1.76 m (5 ft 9 in)
- Position: Left-back

Team information
- Current team: Middlesbrough
- Number: 40

Youth career
- 2014–2024: Middlesbrough

Senior career*
| Years | Team | Apps | (Gls) |
| 2024– | Middlesbrough | 2 | (0) |
- * Club domestic league appearances and goals as of 00:39, 14 August 2024 (UTC)

George Mark McCormick (born 27 January 2005) is an English professional footballer who plays as a left-back for the EFL Championship club Middlesbrough.

== Club career ==
A youth product of Middlesbrough since the U9s, McCormick worked his way up their youth categories and was captain of their U18s. On 8 May 2024, he signed his first professional contract with the club until 2026. He started training with their senior team in the summer of 2024. He made his senior and professional debut with Middlesbrough in a 3–0 EFL Cup win over Leeds on 14 August 2024. McCormick made his first league appearance as a late sub vs West Bromwich Albion on 1 October 2024
