= 2009–10 Middlesbrough F.C. season =

Middlesbrough F.C.
2009–10 season
- Chairman: Steve Gibson
- Manager: Gareth Southgate (until 20 October); Gordon Strachan (from 26 October)
- Stadium: Riverside
- Championship: 11th
- FA Cup: Third round
- League Cup: Second round
- Top goalscorer: League: Adam Johnson (11); All: Adam Johnson (12)
- Highest home attendance: 27,342 (vs Newcastle United)
- Lowest home attendance: 12,474 (vs Manchester City)
Home colours	Away colours

During 2009–10, Middlesbrough F.C. are competing in the Football League Championship following their relegation from the Premier League at the end of the 2008–09 season. They also competed in the League Cup and the FA Cup.

Despite relegation and pressure from fans, chairman Steve Gibson backed Gareth Southgate to lead Middlesbrough back to the Premier League as manager. However, on 20 October, both Southgate and football consultant, Alan Smith, were relieved of their duties with immediate effect. With regular skipper Emanuel Pogatetz injured, Robert Huth was named captain at the start of the season. After Huth's departure, that honour fell to Gary O'Neil.

== Team kit and sponsors ==
Middlesbrough entered into a new shirt supply agreement with Adidas for this season. The new home shirt and goalkeepers' kit was announced on 18 June 2009. The club's sponsorship agreement with satellite navigation firm Garmin continued into the new season. The new all-cyan away kit was not revealed until 13 August, the week after the season had kicked off.

== Transfers ==
=== Summer transfer window ===
Out of contract defender-cum-midfielder Matthew Bates ended much transfer speculation, which linked him with moves to Premier League clubs, by re-signing with Middlesbrough in a new three-year deal. Middlesbrough's first signing of the summer saw in-demand winger Mark Yeates arrive from Colchester United for an undisclosed fee, reported to be worth an initial £500,000, plus £250,000 dependent on appearances.

When Ross Turnbull left for Chelsea after seeing out his contract, manager Gareth Southgate admitted he had yet to decide whether to promote Academy graduate Jason Steele or whether to sign an experienced goalkeeper. On 6 July, the signing of experienced Welsh international keeper Danny Coyne was announced. The 35-year-old came on a free transfer from Tranmere Rovers, with the management stating that Coyne would compete with Brad Jones for the number 1 spot.

After eight seasons at the club and over two-hundred Middlesbrough appearances, Academy graduate Stewart Downing joined Aston Villa for an initial £10 million, with a further £2 million dependent on appearances, despite the player being injured and several months away from full fitness. Downing had been expected to leave this summer, after handing in a transfer request during the January transfer window, but his injury had cast doubt on a move.

Mido reportedly sealed a season-long loan move to Egyptian side El Zamalek, for a fee of £450,000, with a further £1 million possible should they wish to make the move permanent at the end of the season. The move was confirmed and completed on 3 August.

With Mido's loan move sealed, Middlesbrough were able to complete the signing of striker Leroy Lita, who signed a three-year deal. Lita had been without a club since being released by Reading at the end of last season.

On 17 August, Nathan Porritt went on loan to Darlington for 28 days; he made his professional debut against Crewe Alexandra the following day.

Nearing the end of the transfer window, the number of departures started to increase, with captain Robert Huth and Tuncay both moving to Stoke City. Huth's move was confirmed on 27 August, for a fee of £5 million, possibly rising to a Stoke-record £6 million. Tuncay's move was confirmed the following day, with Stoke paying £5 million for the Turkish player. Gareth Southgate said that, with Emanuel Pogatetz and Chris Riggott still on Boro's books, a replacement for Huth would be promoted from within, but another striker would need to be brought in to replace Tuncay.

Afonso Alves move to Al-Sadd was completed on 4 September, as the transfer window in Qatar remained open longer than in England. Keith Lamb later confirmed Middlesbrough received £7m for the move.

=== Between transfer windows ===
Being in the Championship, loan signings are permitted between the transfer windows. Middlesbrough's first such signing was defender Sean St Ledger from Preston North End on a three-month loan with a view to a permanent transfer in January.

A second loan signing, Hull City striker Caleb Folan, joined Middlesbrough on a three-month loan from 19 September. Folan suffered an injury in training in October and only made one substitute appearance for the club, returning to Hull early at the beginning of December.

On 23 September, John Johnson was loaned out to Northampton Town for one month.

On 30 October they signed their third player on loan, Marcus Bent from Birmingham City on loan for two months.

On 5 November Strachan brought in Aston Villa midfielder Isaiah Osbourne on a two-month deal.

On 17 November 2009 Gordon Strachan signed his third player, Stoke City's Dave Kitson.

=== Summary ===
==== In ====
Date	Player	Previous club	Fee	Ref
26 June 2009	(Republic of Ireland) Mark Yeates	Colchester United	Undisclosed	
6 July 2009	(Wales) Danny Coyne	Unattached (Tranmere Rovers)	Free	
3 August 2009	(England) Leroy Lita	Unattached (Reading)	Free	

==== Loans in ====
Date	Player	Club from	Period	Ref
15 September 2009	(Republic of Ireland) Sean St Ledger	Preston North End	3 months	
19 September 2009	(Republic of Ireland) Caleb Folan	Hull City	Until 7 December 2009	
30 October 2009	(England) Marcus Bent	Birmingham City	3 months	
5 November 2009	(England) Isaiah Osbourne	Aston Villa	2 months	
17 November 2009	(England) Dave Kitson	Stoke City	6 weeks	

==== Trials in ====
Date	Player	Club from	Period	Ref
January 2010	(Netherlands) Dominique Kivuvu	NEC Nijmegen		
January 2010	(England) Nicky Weaver	Dundee United		

==== Out ====
For departures of players out of contract at the end of 2008–09 see 2008–09 Middlesbrough F.C. season.

Date	Player	New Club	Fee	Ref
16 July 2009	(England) Stewart Downing	Aston Villa	£12 million	
27 August 2009	(Germany) Robert Huth	Stoke City	£5 million^{[Note 1]}	
27 August 2009	(Turkey) Tuncay	Stoke City	£5 million	
4 September 2009	(Brazil) Afonso Alves	Al-Sadd	£7 million	
1 February 2010	(England) Adam Johnson	Manchester City	£7 million	
30 June 2010	(France) Jérémie Aliadière	Released	Out of contract	
30 June 2010	(England) Chris Riggott	Released	Out of contract	

^{Note 1} Huth's initial transfer fee is £5 million, possibly rising to £6 million.

==== Loans Out ====
Date	Player	Club to	Period	Ref
3 August 2009	(Egypt) Mido	El Zamalek	Until end of season Fee: £450,000	
17 August 2009	(England) Nathan Porritt	Darlington	Until 14 September 2009	
23 September 2009	(England) John Johnson	Northampton Town	Until 23 October 2009 (Later extended to 1 January 2009)	
19 November 2009	(England) Josh Walker	Northampton Town	Until 1 January 2010	
7 December 2009	(England) Gary Martin	Northampton Town	2 weeks (work experience)	
7 December 2009	(Republic of Ireland) James Cronesberry	Grimsby Town	2 weeks (work experience)	
21 December 2009	(England) Ashley Corker	Cheltenham Town	1 week (work experience)	
	(France) Didier Digard			
23 February 2010	(England) Gary Martin	Újpest	6 months	

==== Trials out ====
Date	Player	Club at	Period	Ref
May 2010	(Netherlands) Marvin Emnes	Fortuna Düsseldorf		

== Squad ==
The squad numbers for the 2009–10 season were announced on 27 July 2009. Brad Jones took over the number 1 shirt, while Matthew Bates moved to 4, pushing Gary O'Neil to 16. Most of the players with high squad numbers moved down the list to fill in the empty spaces. Mido was given the number 9 shirt before going out on loan, while Afonso Alves retained number 12 until he left. Due to the numerous players who transferred in and out or who came on loan, many squad numbers were used by more than 1 player throughout the season.

=== Appearances and goals ===
Appearance and goalscoring records for all the players who are in the Middlesbrough F.C. first team squad during the 2009–10 season.

No.	Pos	Nat	Player	Total		Football League Championship		FA Cup		League Cup	
No.	Pos	Nat	Player	Apps	Goals	Apps	Goals	Apps	Goals	Apps	Goals
1	GK	(Australia) AUS	Brad Jones	23	0	23	0	0	0	0	0
2	DF	(England) ENG	Justin Hoyte	32	1	30	1	1	0	1	0
3	DF	(England) ENG	Andrew Taylor	13	0	12	0	0	0	1	0
4	DF	(England) ENG	Matthew Bates	0	0	0	0	0	0	0	0
5	DF	(England) ENG	Chris Riggott	7	0	6	0	1	0	0	0
6	DF	(Austria) AUT	Emanuel Pogatetz	13	0	13	0	0	0	0	0
7	MF	(Republic of Ireland) IRL	Mark Yeates	21	1	19	1	1	0	1	0
7	FW	(Australia) AUS	Scott McDonald	13	4	13	4	0	0	0	0
8	MF	(France) FRA	Didier Digard	9	0	9	0	0	0	0	0
9	FW	(England) ENG	Leroy Lita	41	9	40	9	0	0	1	0
10	FW	(France) FRA	Jérémie Aliadière	21	4	20	4	0	0	1	0
11	MF	(Netherlands) NED	Marvin Emnes	18	1	16	1	1	0	1	0
12	FW	(Brazil) BRA	Afonso Alves	0	0	0	0	0	0	0	0
12	DF	(Republic of Ireland) IRL	Sean St Ledger	15	2	15	2	0	0	0	0
12	FW	(New Zealand) NZL	Chris Killen	17	3	17	3	0	0	0	0
14	DF	(Germany) GER	Robert Huth	5	0	4	0	0	0	1	0
14	FW	(Republic of Ireland) IRL	Caleb Folan	1	0	1	0	0	0	0	0
14	MF	(Republic of Ireland) IRL	Willo Flood	11	1	11	1	0	0	0	0
15	MF	(Egypt) EGY	Mohamed Shawky	0	0	0	0	0	0	0	0
15	MF	(Republic of Ireland) IRL	Jay O'Shea	2	0	2	0	0	0	0	0
16	MF	(England) ENG	Gary O'Neil	36	4	35	4	1	0	0	0
17	FW	(Turkey) TUR	Tuncay	3	2	3	2	0	0	0	0
17	MF	(Scotland) SCO	Barry Robson	18	5	18	5	0	0	0	0
18	MF	(England) ENG	Adam Johnson	28	12	26	11	1	0	1	1
18	FW	(Scotland) SCO	Lee Miller	10	0	10	0	0	0	0	0
19	FW	(England) ENG	Marcus Bent	8	0	7	0	1	0	0	0
19	DF	(Scotland) SCO	Stephen McManus	16	1	16	1	0	0	0	0
20	MF	(Argentina) ARG	Julio Arca	36	0	34	0	1	0	1	0
21	GK	(Wales) WAL	Danny Coyne	26	0	24	0	1	0	1	0
22	MF	(England) ENG	Josh Walker	1	0	1	0	0	0	0	0
23	DF	(England) ENG	Jonathan Grounds	20	0	20	0	0	0	0	0
24	DF	(England) ENG	Seb Hines	2	0	2	0	0	0	0	0
25	MF	(Australia) AUS	Rhys Williams	34	2	32	2	1	0	1	0
26	MF	(England) ENG	John Johnson	0	0	0	0	0	0	0	0
27	DF	(England) ENG	Joe Bennett	13	0	12	0	0	0	1	0
28	FW	(England) ENG	Jonathan Franks	25	3	23	3	1	0	1	0
29	DF	(England) ENG	Tony McMahon	22	0	21	0	1	0	0	0
30	GK	(England) ENG	Jason Steele	0	0	0	0	0	0	0	0
31	DF	(England) ENG	David Wheater	44	1	42	1	1	0	1	0
32	MF	(England) ENG	Nathan Porritt	0	0	0	0	0	0	0	0
33	FW	(England) ENG	Dave Kitson	6	3	6	3	0	0	0	0
33	DF	(England) ENG	Kyle Naughton	15	0	15	0	0	0	0	0
34	MF	(England) ENG	Isaiah Osbourne	9	0	9	0	0	0	0	0
35	FW	(England) ENG	Luke Williams	5	0	4	0	1	0	0	0
37	MF	(England) ENG	Bruno Pilatos	0	0	0	0	0	0	0	0
38	MF	(Scotland) SCO	Cameron Park	0	0	0	0	0	0	0	0
39	DF	(England) ENG	Ben Gibson	0	0	0	0	0	0	0	0

== Pre-season ==
=== Summary ===
Top scorers
(Australia) Rhys Williams	4
(England) Adam Johnson	2

An early disruption to the new season's planning was the failure of Afonso Alves and Mido to return for the start of pre-season training. Alves returned a few days later, but it took Mido two extra weeks. He was heavily fined by the club and when he finally returned he had to catch up on missed fitness training and did not tour with the rest of the team when they visited Scotland.

Middlesbrough's pre-season campaign consisted entirely of away fixtures. Their pre-season got off to a good start with a 3–0 win over Macclesfield Town, fielding different line-ups in both halves, with only goalkeeper Danny Coyne remaining on the field throughout. This was followed by a strong 5–0 win over Dumbarton, although Didier Digard sustained a hip flexor injury. Boro were without recognised strikers for their friendly against Carlisle United, but continued their winning run with a 2–0 win.

A friendly against Darlington was planned for 29 July, but was cancelled at Darlington's request due to their long injury list. An alternative friendly against Oldham Athletic was swiftly arranged for the same night. In that game, Middlesbrough came from a goal down to lead, 2–1, but let their lead slip and the game finished in a 2–2 draw.

Their final game saw Middlesbrough again come from behind. Rhys Williams scored his fourth goal of pre-season to level the tie against Millwall. The game, which finished 1–1, was a benefit match for former Lions and Republic of Ireland striker Richard Sadlier.

=== Results ===
Win Draw Loss

Note: Results are given with Middlesbrough score listed first. Man of the Match is according to mfc.co.uk.

Game	Date	Venue	Opponent	Result F–A	Attendance	Boro Goalscorers	Man/Men of the Match
1	18 July 2009	A	Macclesfield Town	3–0	728	Arca 71' (pen.), Emnes 86', Franks 88'	Yeates (1st half), Franks (2nd half)
2	22 July 2009	A	Dumbarton	5–0		O'Neil 6', Dunlop 42' (o.g.), Aliadière 45', A. Johnson 70', Williams 73'	Not named
3	25 July 2009	A	Carlisle United	2–0	2,420	A. Johnson 4', Williams 80'	O'Neil
4	29 July 2009	A	Oldham Athletic	2–2	1,139	Williams 58', Huth	A. Johnson
5	1 August 2009	A	Millwall	1–1	3,620	Williams 81'	Huth

=== Championship ===
==== Results summary ====
Overall								Home						Away					
Pld	W	D	L	GF	GA	GD	Pts	W	D	L	GF	GA	GD	W	D	L	GF	GA	GD
46	16	14	16	59	50	+9	62	9	8	6	25	21	+4	7	6	10	34	29	+5

==== Results by matchday ====
Round	1	2	3	4	5	6	7	8	9	10	11	12	13	14	15	16	17	18	19	20	21	22	23	24	25	26	27	28	29	30	31	32	33	34	35	36	37	38	39	40	41	42	43	44	45	46
Ground	H	A	A	H	A	H	A	H	A	H	A	H	H	A	H	A	H	A	A	H	H	A	H	A	A	H	A	H	A	H	H	A	A	H	A	H	A	H	H	A	H	A	H	A	H	A
Result	D	W	W	W	L	W	W	L	D	L	W	L	W	D	L	L	D	D	W	L	L	L	W	L	L	D	W	D	D	W	W	L	L	W	L	D	D	D	W	D	D	W	W	L	D	L
Position	1	4	2	1	3	2	2	3	4	4	3	4	4	4	7	10	11	10	6	10	11	14	10	11	13	12	10	9	10	8	8	8	9	8	10	10	11	10	8	9	8	8	8	8	8	11

A = Away; H = Home; W = Win; D = Draw; L = Loss

Win Draw Loss

=== Results ===
Win Draw Loss

Note: Results are given with Middlesbrough score listed first. Man of the Match is according to mfc.co.uk.

Game	Date	Venue	Opponent	Result F–A	Attendance	Boro Goalscorers	Man of the Match
1	7 August 2009	H	Sheffield United	0–0	23,541		Wheater
2	15 August 2009	A	Swansea City	3–0	16,201	A. Johnson 32', Emnes 52', Tuncay 82'	O'Neil
3	18 August 2009	A	Scunthorpe United	2–0	8,274	A. Johnson (2) 28', 53' (pen.)	Coyne
4	22 August 2009	H	Doncaster Rovers	2–0	22,041	Tuncay 17', Lita 71'	Huth
5	29 August 2009	A	Bristol City	1–2	14,402	A. Johnson 80' (pen.)	Arca
6	12 September 2009	H	Ipswich Town	3–1	19,742	O'Neil 17', Aliadière (2) 66', 85'	Arca
7	15 September 2009	A	Sheffield Wednesday	3–1	21,722	Purse (o.g.) 19', Aliadière 49', A. Johnson 85'	A. Johnson
8	19 September 2009	H	West Bromwich Albion	0–5	22,725		Williams
9	26 September 2009	A	Coventry City	2–2	16,771	St Ledger 40', Williams 45'+3	Jones
10	29 September 2009	H	Leicester City	0–1	18,577		Lita
11	3 October 2009	A	Reading	2–0	17,638	St Ledger 12', Lita 55'	Lita
12	18 October 2009	H	Watford	0–1	18,957		O'Neil
13	20 October 2009	H	Derby County	2–0	17,459	A. Johnson (2) 22'(pen.), 59'	Lita
14	24 October 2009	A	Preston North End	2–2	16,116	O'Neil 43', A. Johnson 67'	O'Neil
15	31 October 2009	H	Plymouth	0–1	21,141		Williams
16	7 November 2009	A	Crystal Palace	0–1	15,321		Hoyte
17	21 November 2009	H	Nottingham Forest	1–1	22,710	Lita 5'	Jones
18	28 November 2009	A	Peterborough United	2–2	10,772	Kitson 28', 58'	Kitson
19	5 December 2009	A	QPR	5–1	13,949	Kitson 31', Lita (2) 50' (pen.), 60', O'Neil 75', Yeates 87'	Lita
20	8 December 2009	H	Blackpool	0–3	18,089		Yeates
21	13 December 2009	H	Cardiff City	0–1	17,232		Yeates
22	20 December 2009	A	Newcastle United	0–2	49,644		Pogatetz
23	26 December 2009	H	Scunthorpe United	3–0	20,647	A. Johnson 11' (pen.), Williams 45', Aliadière 46'	Williams
24	28 December 2009	A	Barnsley	1–2	18,001	Hoyte 23'	Riggott
25	16 January 2010	A	Sheffield United	0–1	23,974		Not awarded
26	23 January 2010	H	Swansea City	1–1	16,847	Flood 58'	Coyne
27	26 January 2010	A	Doncaster Rovers	4–1	10,794	A. Johnson (2) 30', 90'+1, Franks 45'+2, Lita 66'	A. Johnson
28	30 January 2010	H	Bristol City	0-0	17,865		Wheater
29	6 February 2010	A	Ipswich Town	1–1	21,243	Wheater 62'	McManus
30	9 February 2010	H	Barnsley	2–1	17,775	Killen 24', O'Neil 35'	McDonald
31	13 February 2010	H	Peterborough United	1–0	18,412	Robson 7'	Robson
32	16 February 2010	A	Blackpool	0–2	7,936		Wheater
33	20 February 2010	A	Nottingham Forest	0–1	25,498		McManus
34	27 February 2010	H	QPR	2–0	17,568	Robson (2) 39' (pen.), 45'+2 (pen.)	Robson
35	6 March 2010	A	Cardiff City	0–1	19,803		O'Neil
36	13 March 2010	H	Newcastle United	2–2	27,342	Robson 36', McDonald 74'	Robson
37	16 March 2010	A	Derby County	2–2	27,143	Robson 15', Lita 90'	Robson
38	20 March 2010	H	Reading	1–1	17,082	Killen 47'	Jones
39	23 March 2010	H	Preston North End	2–0	16,974	Killen 29', Franks 90'	Jones
40	27 March 2010	A	Watford	1–1	14,038	Lita 55'	McManus
41	3 April 2010	H	Crystal Palace	1–1	18,428	McDonald 15'	Williams
42	5 April 2010	A	Plymouth	2–0	11,770	McManus 22', Franks 90'+4	Robson
43	10 April 2010	H	Sheffield Wednesday	1–0	19,932	McDonald 40'	Wheater
44	17 April 2010	A	West Bromwich Albion	0–2	22,548		Jones
45	24 April 2010	H	Coventry City	1–1	20,771	McDonald 52'	L. Williams
46	2 May 2010	A	Leicester City	0–2	30,223		Jones

=== August ===
Middlesbrough kicked off the English football season with a televised Friday night game at home to last season's play-off finalists Sheffield United. With Brad Jones injured, Danny Coyne was handed his debut, along with Mark Yeates, while pre-season top scorer Rhys Williams started the game in midfield. As was their problem last season, Middlesbrough struggled to create chances in front of goal. Yeates and Adam Johnson were lively on the wings but with a lack of physical presence up front, the home side were unable to score, even following the introduction of new boy Leroy Lita in the second half. The defence coped well to keep a clean sheet, as the game petered out to a 0–0 draw.

A long trip to Swansea City brought a first away victory in the league since November, and ended their club record run of twelve consecutive away defeats. With Didier Digard out injured for two to three weeks, Gary O'Neil—who delayed a hernia operation to play—lined up in midfield, while Lita was handed his first start up front. Adam Johnson scored Boro's first goal of the season when his cross-cum-shot slipped past Swansea goalkeeper Dorus de Vries. Marvin Emnes got Middlesbrough's second while substitute Tuncay, still expected to leave before the end of the month, headed home the third from a Johnson corner. The 3–0 win was their biggest away from home since August 2005.

A second consecutive away win followed at Scunthorpe. Adam Johnson latched onto a fine ball from Gary O'Neil and lobbed it over the head of Scunthorpe goalkeeper Joe Murphy. Their second goal came in a frantic start to the second half. Rhys Williams was brought down in the box with just two minutes played, and the referee awarded a penalty. Murphy saved Johnson's spot kick, but Johnson got to the ball first and was subsequently brought down by the Scunthorpe keeper. A second penalty was awarded, and this time Johnson fired home. Scunthorpe had plenty of chances to mount a comeback but Danny Coyne pulled off a series of good saves to maintain his side's record as the only one yet to concede a goal in the Championship.

Middlesbrough's winning run continued with a 2–0 win over Doncaster Rovers. Marvin Emnes had to be taken off with a head injury following a collision with Doncaster goalkeeper Neil Sullivan. His replacement, Tuncay, put Boro ahead almost immediately after his introduction, while Leroy Lita got his first goal for the club in the second half. The win moved them top of the table, until Cardiff regained the spot the following day.

Boro suffered their first loss in the Championship, away to Bristol City, going down, 2–1. A Nicky Maynard stoppage time finish condemned Middlesbrough, having scored earlier in the game as well. This was the visitors' first game without Robert Huth and Tuncay, who had both moved to Stoke City.

=== September ===
Following the international break, Middlesbrough played against Ipswich Town, winning, 3–1. Gary O'Neil scored his first for the season, which was followed up by substitute Jérémie Aliadière's brace in the second half. However, a penalty was conceded in stoppage time in Ipswich's favour, ending Boro's Riverside clean sheet streak this season.

Middlesbrough continued their great start to September, defeating Sheffield Wednesday, 3–1. A Darren Purse own goal equalised the game, followed by second half strikes from Jérémie Aliadière and Adam Johnson which led the side to victory. Following Newcastle's loss to Blackpool, Middlesbrough leapfrogged Newcastle into 2nd, and are only one point behind WBA.

Middlesbrough's biggest test of the season came the following week, against West Bromwich. After a bright start, Rhys Williams conceded a foul and former Boro trainee Chris Brunt scored his first of two, following a deflection off Julio Arca. Everything went downhill from hereon, with West Bromwich dominating proceedings. Their second came from a goalkeeping miskick, as Danny Coyne left his line to clear, but only to Brunt, who finished from 50 yards out into an empty goal. Boro, played poorly, offering one of their worst performances so far. This result dropped the Boro to third, below Newcastle United, and affected their goal difference greatly. After the game, Gareth Southgate admitted his team had been 'battered'.

Middlesbrough started off brightly against Coventry City, taking a 2–0 lead into half time, with goals coming from St Ledger and Rhys Williams. However, two second half goals to Coventry, including one in the 5th minute of stoppage time from Leon Best condemned Boro to a disappointing draw. |}

== League Cup ==
Middlesbrough were given a first round bye. They faced Nottingham Forest in the second round. Despite Middlesbrough taking the lead through Adam Johnson, they lost the game in extra time 2 – 1. This was Middlesbrough's first loss for the season.

Round	Date	Venue	Opponent	Result F–A	Attendance	Boro Goalscorers	Man of the Match
2	25 August 2009	A	Nottingham Forest	1–2 AET	8,838	A. Johnson 43'	Wheater

== FA Cup ==
Middlesbrough were given a first round bye. They faced Manchester City in the third round. With the only goal scored by Benjani Mwaruwari for City, Middlesbrough finally lost, 0–1.

Round	Date	Venue	Opponent	Result F–A	Attendance	Boro Goalscorers	Man of the Match
3	3 January 2010	H	Manchester City	0–1	12,474		O'Neil

== Staff ==
Before the season began, a shakeup in the backroom team saw Malcolm Crosby leave his post as assistant manager, a role he had held for three years, since Gareth Southgate began as manager. He had joined Middlesbrough two years prior to that, as manager of the reserve side. Head of sports science Chris Barnes, sports psychologist Michael Caulfield, fitness coach Frank Nuttall and masseuse Dave French also left the club as part of a restructuring of the back room team.

Gareth Southgate's former manager at Crystal Palace, Alan Smith, was brought in as a football consultant. Southgate and chairman Steve Gibson discussed the matter in detail before the appointment, which sees Smith take a behind-the-scenes role, rather than being involved on the training pitch or in the dressing room.

On 20 October, Gareth Southgate and Alan Smith were both relieved of their duties with immediate effect.

On 3 May, the day after the final game of the season, Middlesbrough announced that first team coach Colin Cooper, goalkeeping coach Stephen Pears and reserve team coach Martin Scott had all been relieved of their duties, with Gordon Strachan planning changes for a promotion push next season.

== Other events ==
A special promotion on Half Season Cards was launched in early December, which offered fans who bought the tickets a chance to "win" a full refund, if Middlesbrough won their first four Championship games after Christmas. However, following feedback from a number of existing Season Card holders, who had paid their money up front long before the season began, the special offer was swiftly withdrawn.

During half time of a Championship match against Nottingham Forest at the Riverside Stadium, which ended 1–1, Top Gear presenters Jeremy Clarkson, Richard Hammond and James May made a surprise appearance to promote their automotive exhibition at the MIMA. They originally walked onto the pitch wearing rival Newcastle United's shirts as a joke before quickly changing into Middlesbrough shirts to promote the exhibition.
