= 2008–09 Middlesbrough F.C. season =

Middlesbrough
2008–09 season
- Chairman: Steve Gibson
- Manager: Gareth Southgate
- Premier League: 19th (relegated)
- FA Cup: Sixth round
- League Cup: Third round
- Top goalscorer: League: Tuncay (7); All: Tuncay (8)
- Highest home attendance: 33,767 (vs. Manchester United, 29 December 2008)
- Lowest home attendance: 15,694 (vs. West Ham United, FA Cup fifth round replay; 25 February 2009)
Home colours	Away colours

- All Competitions
	Wins	Draws	Losses	Win %
Home	8	8	4	40.0%
Away	3	3	14	15.0%
Both	11	11	18	27.5%

- Premier League
	Wins	Draws	Losses	Win %
Home	5	8	4	29.4%
Away	2	2	12	12.5%
Both	7	10	16	21.2%

The 2008–09 season was Middlesbrough's eleventh consecutive season in the Premier League. They were relegated at the end of the season. They were knocked out of the League Cup in the third round and knocked out of the FA Cup in the quarter-finals (sixth round).

Gareth Southgate continued as manager under chairman Steve Gibson. Before the season, Southgate was considering whether to continue with the traditional role of a club captain, but later decided that Emanuel Pogatetz would continue being captain following his performances in the final ten games of the previous season.

== Team kit and sponsors ==
Middlesbrough's kits were produced by Erreà for the fifteenth and final season, and sponsored by GPS manufacturer Garmin. Back at the start of 2008, the club ran a poll to decide whether the club should return to the white band of prior seasons. The votes came out in favour of the band, and it was then up to the fans to decide between three different designs. The winning shirt was announced on 7 May 2008 to be choice A – the white band with a curl. The away kit, announced on 17 July 2008, would see a return to the popular black and blue striped kit worn by Jack Charlton's side of the mid-1970s.

== Transfers ==
=== Summer transfer window ===
Middlesbrough net spending over the 2008 summer transfer window was almost nil, as money spent bringing in new faces was matched by money brought in through player sales, though it had only been half a year since Afonso Alves' club-record signing during the previous season.

The first transfer for the season was thought to have been announced back in May, with Maidstone United's England youth international defender Chris Smalling signing a two-year contract. However, the player changed his mind, the contract was cancelled, and later the same month he decided to join Fulham instead as it was closer to his home.

Mark Schwarzer's departure at the end of the previous season saw Gareth Southgate announce that Brad Jones and Ross Turnbull would fight it out for the first choice goalkeeper's shirt, and thus no goalkeepers were amongst the signings during the summer, much to the initial dismay of Boro supporters. Liverpool goalkeeper Charles Itandje later revealed that Middlesbrough tried to sign him on loan during the summer, but that his club refused to allow him to move.

The club's first signings of the summer were both announced on the same day in early July, with Dutch forward Marvin Emnes arriving in a deal worth €4 million (£3.2 million at the time) and French midfielder Didier Digard arriving from PSG for €5 million (£4 million).

Next up came a series of midfield departures. After six years on Teesside, Dutch midfielder and former club captain George Boateng left for newly promoted Hull City for a fee of £1 million, while academy graduate and England under-21 midfielder Lee Cattermole signed for Wigan Athletic in a deal worth £3.5 million, rising to £4 million based on appearances. Boro's midfield options were further reduced when Hérold Goulon, signed two years earlier, left without playing a senior game for the club.

Wellington Phoenix's New Zealand international left-back Tony Lochhead joined the club on a week-long trial at the end of July but the club eventually decided against offering him a contract.

Finally, just a week before the season began and after only a year on Teesside, Luke Young moved to Aston Villa for a fee of £5.5 million rising to £6 million based on appearances. Fans were disappointed with the sale but, coupled with Young's wish to make the move, the club felt the offer was too good to turn down, having only paid £2.5 million for him a year earlier. A replacement was brought in when Middlesbrough completed the £3 million signing of Arsenal's Justin Hoyte before the first game of the season, but not in time for him to be eligible to play. The right-back signed a four-year contract.

=== January transfer window ===
In mid-November, before the window opened, former youth goalkeeper David Knight returned to the club on a month-to-month contract as cover following an injury to third-choice keeper Jason Steele.

Middlesbrough and MFK Košice came to an agreement that would see talented young players exchanged between the two clubs. It was verbally agreed that 17-year-old Peter Gál-Andrezly would join the Middlesbrough reserve side for the second half of the season. Two further players, Serbian Under-21 international Nemanja Matić and 18-year-old Juraj Hovančík, came to England on a trial period during December.

During December, the club told reporters that there were no funds available for transfers, meaning they needed to sell before they could buy, although at the same time the club were not looking to move on any of their best players either. This became a key element of the January transfer window.

The transfer window was once again dominated by reports linking Stewart Downing with a move to Tottenham Hotspur, but this time there was a basis for such reports. Tottenham manager Harry Redknapp announced his interest in Downing towards the end of December. With the transfer window open, Spurs put in a bid for the player, reported to be around £6 million, which was described as "derisory" by Middlesbrough chief executive Keith Lamb. An improved offer was submitted and immediately rejected. Middlesbrough told Tottenham that the player was not for sale and any further interest they had would not be entertained, while chairman Steve Gibson told the media that no senior player would be leaving the club in January. Shortly afterwards, Downing submitted a written transfer request. The request was considered before being rejected. Downing's father, Stewart Senior, revealed his son's reasons for submitting his transfer request, stating that "when he signed his new contract [in February 2008] he was assured that there would be significant investment in the squad", arguing this had not happened.

Reiterating their position that they would not be letting any senior players leave the club during January, the club rejected a £4.5 million offer from Portsmouth to take Gary O'Neil back to his former club.

With the club falling into the relegation zone and a number of players ruled out through injury and suspension, Middlesbrough eventually moved into the transfer market on 22 January, with their first move bringing in striker Marlon King on loan from Wigan Athletic until the end of the season. King had been on loan at Hull City but his time there was cut short after he fell out with their manager. A day later, Mido made a move in the opposite direction, also on a loan until the end of the season.

Crystal Palace midfielder Ben Watson underwent a medical at Middlesbrough, after the two clubs agreed a £2 million fee. However, Wigan's bid for the player was also accepted and Watson decided to move there instead.

Following a successful loan spell, Academy graduate Tom Craddock made a permanent move to Luton Town. The striker started only one game during his time on Teesside before completing his £80,000 move.

=== End of season ===
Ross Turnbull left the club at the end of the season on a free transfer, to join Chelsea, after rejecting several contract offers, citing that he wanted to play regular first team football. The goalkeeper played less than 30 first team games for Middlesbrough and had been dropped earlier in the season in favour of teammate Brad Jones. David Knight also left at the end of the year, to join Darlington.

Out of contract winger Graeme Owens left the club to join Scottish Premier League side Kilmarnock.

=== Summary ===
==== In ====
Date	Player	Previous club	Fee	Ref
4 July 2008	(Netherlands) Marvin Emnes	Sparta Rotterdam	£3.2 million	
4 July 2008	(France) Didier Digard	Paris Saint-German	£4 million	
16 August 2008	(England) Justin Hoyte	Arsenal	£3 million	
4 November 2008	(England) David Knight	Mansfield Town	Free	
November 2008^{[Note 1]}	(Cyprus) Onisiforos Roushias	Enosis Neon Paralimni		

^{Note 1} Roushias made his under-18 debut on 15 November 2008. He was not present in the start-of-season squad list so joined between these two dates.

==== Loans in ====
Date	Player	On Loan From	Period	Ref
4 January 2009	(Slovakia) Peter Gál-Andrezly	MFK Košice	Until end of season	
22 January 2009	(Jamaica) Marlon King	Wigan Athletic	Until end of season	

==== Trials in ====
Date	Player	On Trial From	Period	Ref
29 July 2008	(New Zealand) Tony Lochhead	Wellington Phoenix	1 week	
1 December 2008	(Serbia) Nemanja Matić	MFK Košice	2 days^{[Note 1]}	
1 December 2008	(Slovakia) Juraj Hovančík	MFK Košice	1 week	
13 February 2009	(Cyprus) Demetris Moulazimis	Enosis Neon Paralimni		

^{Note 1} Matić's trial was initially intended to last for 1 week but was cut short by an international call-up.

==== Out ====
For departures of players out of contract at the end of 2007–08 see 2007–08 Middlesbrough F.C. season.

Date	Player	New club	Fee	Ref
16 July 2008	(Netherlands) George Boateng	Hull City	£1 million	
29 July 2008	(England) Lee Cattermole	Wigan Athletic	£3.5 million^{[Note 1]}	
7 August 2008	(France) Hérold Goulon	–	Released	
7 August 2008	(England) Luke Young	Aston Villa	£5.5 million^{[Note 2]}	
30 January 2009	(England) Tom Craddock	Luton Town	£80,000	
16 June 2009	(England) Graeme Owens	Kilmarnock	Out of contract	
2 July 2009	(England) Ross Turnbull	Chelsea	Out of contract	
3 July 2009	(England) David Knight	Darlington	Out of contract	

^{Note 1} Cattermole's transfer fee is £3.5 million rising to £4 million based on appearances.
^{Note 2} Young's transfer fee is £5.5 million rising by £250,000 after 30 appearances, and a further £250,000 after 60 appearances.

==== Loans out ====
Date	Player	Club at	Period	Ref
21 August 2008	(England) Tony McMahon	Sheffield Wednesday	To 24 October 2008^{[Note 1]}	
1 September 2008	(England) Jonathan Grounds	Norwich City	To 2 October 2008^{[Note 2]}	
17 October 2008	(England) Tom Craddock	Luton Town	To 17 January 2009^{[Note 3]}	
3 November 2008	(England) Tony McMahon	Sheffield Wednesday	1 month	
25 November 2008	(England) John Johnson	Tranmere Rovers	To 31 December 2008	
6 January 2009	(England) Seb Hines	Derby County	1 month	
6 January 2009	(England) Jonathan Grounds	Norwich City	2 months	
7 January 2009	(England) Graeme Owens	Blackpool	2 months^{[Note 4]}	
23 January 2009	(Egypt) Mido	Wigan Athletic	To end of season	
30 January 2009	(Australia) Rhys Williams	Burnley	3 months	
13 February 2009	(England) Seb Hines	Oldham Athletic	1 month	

^{Note 1} McMahon's loan was extended from an initial period of 1 month, but then cut short when he was recalled by Middlesbrough.
^{Note 2} Grounds' loan was initially intended to last three months, but was cut short when he was recalled. He returned for a further two months later in January.
^{Note 3} Craddock's loan was extended from one month, to two months, and then to three.
^{Note 4} Owens' loan was extended from one month to two months.

== Squad ==
=== Senior squad ===
Squad numbers for the 2008–09 season were announced on 23 July 2008. Changes saw Julio Arca move from 3 to 20, with Andrew Taylor moving from 33 to 3. Marvin Emnes took the number 11 shirt, vacated by Jérémie Aliadière's move to number 10. Didier Digard received the vacant number 8 shirt. Ross Turnbull and Brad Jones stayed at 21 and 22 respectively, leaving the number 1 shirt empty. Before they left, Luke Young, Lee Cattermole and Hérold Goulon were given numbers 2, 27 and 37 respectively. Justin Hoyte became the new number 2 upon his arrival, while Nathan Porritt was given number 33 before the away match at Portsmouth. Franks was given the number 37 shirt before the away match at Everton.

==== Appearances and goals ====
Appearance and goalscoring records for all the players who were in the Middlesbrough F.C. first team squad during the 2008–09 season.

No.	Pos	Nat	Player	Total		Premier League		FA Cup		League Cup	
No.	Pos	Nat	Player	Apps	Goals	Apps	Goals	Apps	Goals	Apps	Goals
2	DF	(England) ENG	Justin Hoyte	28	0	17+5	0	3+1	0	2	0
3	DF	(England) ENG	Andrew Taylor	28	0	20+6	0	1	0	1	0
4	MF	(England) ENG	Gary O'Neil	35	4	28+1	4	4	0	1+1	0
5	DF	(England) ENG	Chris Riggott	20	0	17	0	1	0	1+1	0
6	DF	(Austria) AUT	Emanuel Pogatetz	33	1	27	1	4	0	2	0
8	MF	(France) FRA	Didier Digard	27	1	15+8	0	2	0	2	1
9	FW	(Egypt) EGY	Mido	15	5	5+8	4	0+1	0	1	1
10	FW	(France) FRA	Jérémie Aliadière	34	3	27+2	2	3	0	2	1
11	MF	(Netherlands) NED	Marvin Emnes	21	2	3+12	0	0+4	1	1+1	1
12	FW	(Brazil) BRA	Afonso Alves	35	7	24+7	4	3	3	1	0
14	DF	(Germany) GER	Robert Huth	28	0	23+1	0	4	0	0	0
15	MF	(Egypt) EGY	Mohamed Shawky	16	0	11+2	0	1	0	2	0
16	FW	(Jamaica) JAM	Marlon King	13	2	9+4	2	0	0	0	0
17	FW	(Turkey) TUR	Tuncay	37	8	30+3	7	3+1	1	0	0
19	MF	(England) ENG	Stewart Downing	43	2	37	0	5	2	1	0
20	MF	(Argentina) ARG	Julio Arca	21	0	14+4	0	3	0	0	0
21	GK	(England) ENG	Ross Turnbull	23	0	22	0	0	0	1	0
22	GK	(Australia) AUS	Brad Jones	22	0	16	0	5	0	1	0
26	DF	(England) ENG	Matthew Bates	20	1	15+2	1	3	0	0	0
28	MF	(England) ENG	Adam Johnson	33	2	10+16	0	3+2	0	1+1	2
29	DF	(England) ENG	Tony McMahon	15	0	13	0	1+1	0	0	0
31	DF	(England) ENG	David Wheater	38	2	31+1	1	5	1	1	0
32	GK	(England) ENG	Jason Steele	0	0	0	0	0	0	0	0
33	MF	(England) ENG	Nathan Porritt	0	0	0	0	0	0	0	0
34	DF	(England) ENG	Joe Bennett	1	0	0+1	0	0	0	0	0
35	MF	(England) ENG	Graeme Owens	0	0	0	0	0	0	0	0
36	MF	(England) ENG	John Johnson	1	0	0+1	0	0	0	0	0
37	FW	(England) ENG	Jonathan Franks	1	0	0+1	0	0	0	0	0
38	DF	(England) ENG	Seb Hines	1	0	0+1	0	0	0	0	0
39	DF	(Australia) AUS	Rhys Williams	1	0	0	0	0	0	1	0
40	DF	(England) ENG	Jonathan Grounds	3	0	2	0	0	0	1	0
41	MF	(England) ENG	Josh Walker	10	0	2+4	0	1+2	0	0+1	0
42	FW	(England) ENG	Tom Craddock	0	0	0	0	0	0	0	0

==== Discipline ====
Disciplinary records for 2008–09 league and cup matches. Only players with one or more cards are included.

No.	Nat.	Player	Yellow cards	Red cards
3	(England)	Andrew Taylor	3	0
4	(England)	Gary O'Neil	11	0
5	(England)	Chris Riggott	3	0
6	(Austria)	Emanuel Pogatetz	4	1
8	(France)	Didier Digard	4	1
9	(Egypt)	Mido	3	0
10	(France)	Jérémie Aliadière	1	0
12	(Brazil)	Afonso Alves	2	0
14	(Germany)	Robert Huth	5	0
15	(Egypt)	Mohamed Shawky	3	0
16	(Jamaica)	Marlon King	2	0
17	(Turkey)	Tuncay	4	0
20	(Argentina)	Julio Arca	5	0
26	(England)	Matthew Bates	3	1
28	(England)	Adam Johnson	2	0
29	(England)	Tony McMahon	3	0
31	(England)	David Wheater	2	1

== Pre-season ==
Top scorers
(Brazil) Afonso Alves	4
(France) Jérémie Aliadière	3
(England) David Wheater	2
(England) Adam Johnson	2

The first game saw Boro visit Bootham Crescent to play York City. The visitors fielded different outfield sides in both halves, with Brad Jones the only player to appear in both halves. Jonathan Franks put Middlesbrough ahead in the second half, before York scored two goals to take the lead. David Wheater scored a late equaliser to leave the score tied at 2–2.

Next up came a trip to Portugal for the Algarve Challenge Cup. The mini-league format would see 3 points awarded for a win and 1 for a draw, with an extra point for every goal scored. Boro's first game was against Scottish champions Celtic. The first half finished goalless, and the manager again elected to make many changes, with only Ross Turnbull and Josh Walker remaining on the field. Jérémie Aliadière put Boro ahead late in the second half after the Celtic goalkeeper's clearance rebounded back off of the Boro forward. Jan Vennegoor of Hesselink leveled the game during stoppage time to end the game at 1–1.

It was a similar scenario in the next game, versus Vitória Guimarães. Nine changes at half time saw only Turnbull and Adam Johnson retain their places. Boro conceded another late goal to lose the game 0–1. Boro ended the competition with two points – one for a draw, and one for their solitary goal.

Boro picked up their first pre-season win with victory over Carlisle United. French pair Jérémie Aliadière and Didier Digard scored Boro's goals. Aliadière scored within a minute of the second half starting, before Carlisle levelled almost instantly. Digard struck a great shot to win Boro the game.

A trip to Scotland for a second year running saw a remarkable comeback versus Hibernian. Hibs took a two-goal lead thanks to Steven Fletcher's goals in either half. Afonso Alves, on as a substitute, put Boro back in the game with a goal within a minute of coming on. Wheater's header levelled the game before Alves got his second goal to win the game 3–2 for Boro. There was bad news however as Julio Arca was injured and ruled out for six weeks.

A young Boro side cruised to a comfortable victory over Darlington in the next friendly. Adam Johnson opened the scoring by converting a penalty, with Marvin Emnes scoring his first goal for the club to leave the visitors two-up at the break. A Lewis Hardman own goal and a goal from Tony McMahon put Boro further in front, before Johnson scored his second of the game to complete a comfortable 5–0 victory.

Pre-season finished in fantastic fashion, albeit their final game didn't start off in the best way. Sparta Rotterdam opened the scoring after just two minutes, but then Boro took charge. Alves scored three minutes later to level the game. A further three minutes down the line, Aliadière put Boro in front. Josh Walker got the third on thirteen minutes, and Alves got his second two minutes later. Stewart Downing made it five for the visitors just after the half-hour mark, while Rhys Williams added another shortly after half-time. No further goals were forthcoming and the game finished 6–1.

=== Results ===
Win Draw Loss

Note: Results are given with Middlesbrough score listed first. Man of the Match is according to mfc.co.uk.

Game	Date	Venue	Opponent	Result F–A	Attendance	Boro Goalscorers	Man/Men of the Match
1	18 July 2008	A	York City	2–2	3,177	Franks, Wheater	Bennett (1st half), Downing (2nd half)
2	22 July 2008	N	Celtic	1–1	1,500	Aliadière	Emnes (1st half), O'Neil (2nd half)
3	24 July 2008	N	Vitória Guimarães	0–1	400		A. Johnson (1st half), Bennett (2nd half)
4	29 July 2008	A	Carlisle United	2–1	3,281	Aliadière, Digard	Digard and A. Johnson
5	2 August 2008	A	Hibernian	3–2	6,325	Alves (2), Wheater	O'Neil
6	5 August 2008	A	Darlington	5–0	5,811	A.Johnson (2,1 pen), Emnes, Hardman (o.g.), McMahon	Williams
7	8 August 2008	A	Sparta Rotterdam	6–1		Alves (2), Aliadière, Walker, Downing, Williams	Digard

== Premier League ==
=== August ===
Middlesbrough began their season with a victory for the first time in eight years with a 2–1 win over Tottenham Hotspur. Brad Jones was named as Gareth Southgate's new number 1, but there was no place in the starting line-up for any of the club's summer signings, with Didier Digard and Marvin Emnes on the bench, while Justin Hoyte, only signed on the day, was ineligible. An early chance for David Wheater was controversially ruled out for a foul, but he converted again in the second half for Boro's first goal of the season. Mido, on as a substitute, converted a cross/shot from fellow substitute Digard to put the home side two goals up, before Robert Huth conceded an own goal late in stoppage time.

There was heartbreak for Middlesbrough at Anfield, as late goals from Liverpool saw them come from behind to win 2–1. Ross Turnbull started in goal after Brad Jones dislocated a finger during the warm-up, but the side were otherwise unchanged. It was goalless until Mido, again on as a substitute, put the visitors ahead after seventy minutes. Meanwhile, Justin Hoyte made his debut as a substitute for the injured Andrew Taylor. Boro looked set to record their first win at Anfield for thirty-two years until Jamie Carragher's shot deflected off Emanuel Pogatetz for an own goal with five minutes to go. Steven Gerrard's goal four minutes into stoppage time completed the comeback.

Stoke City were Middlesbrough's next opponents when they came to the Riverside. The visitors frustrated the home side until Amdy Faye was sent off for a two-footed tackle on Mohamed Shawky; Afonso Alves converted the resulting direct free kick. Stewart Downing missed the chance to extend Boro's lead when his penalty kick struck the bar, before for the third time in three league games, Middlesbrough conceded an own goal, this time courtesy of Justin Hoyte. Five minutes from the end, the home side's lead was restored with Tuncay's first goal of the season. The 2–1 victory extended Boro's home record to five wins from the last five home games in all competitions. It also gave the club its best Premier League start in nine years.

Gareth Southgate picked up the Premier League Manager of the Month award for August, becoming only the second person after Stuart Pearce to pick up both the Player and Manager of the Month awards, and the first Middlesbrough manager to win the award since Terry Venables in January 2001.

=== September ===
The international break left Middlesbrough without Tuncay and Shawky after both picked up injuries, while David Wheater could only make the bench after suffering from tonsillitis, so Digard, Riggott and Mido came in. Nathan Porritt was named as a substitute for the first time on an all-Academy bench. Portsmouth were the more dominant side throughout the match, however it was Boro who took the lead after Mido's fourth goal of the season. Jermain Defoe scored a brace for the home side in the second half to give them a 2–1 win. Digard picked up an injury and had to be taken off while Boro thought they should have had a penalty after Downing was brought down in the box.

Middlesbrough were on top for much of the game at Sunderland's Stadium of Light, but ultimately came away with nothing from the 2–0 defeat. Mido was set to start, but was injured in the warm-up and was replaced by the initially benched Alves. Downing and Alves created a host of good chances but none were converted. With sixteen minutes to go before the final whistle, Aliadière was brought down in the penalty area, but Downing sent his penalty kick flying over the bar for his second penalty miss of the season. The visitors were punished for their inability to score when Michael Chopra scored two goals in the final ten minutes.

Gareth Southgate's 100th game in charge, which saw Stewart Downing named captain for the first time in Emanuel Pogatetz' absence was a frustrating one. They saw two chances cleared off the line by former Middlesbrough player James Morrison, a shot hit the bar, and a penalty shout turned down as they squandered plenty of chances to beat Tony Mowbray's West Bromwich Albion. Instead, they were left to pick up the pieces after a 1–0 defeat courtesy of Jonas Olsson.

=== October ===
After going through September with four defeats from four games in all competitions, Middlesbrough picked up their first away win of 2008 against Wigan Athletic. Grounds and Riggott came into the side as Taylor and Huth were out injured, and the weakened defence earned Boro their first clean sheet of the season. Aliadière picked up his first Premier League goal of the season in the dying minutes – Boro's 600th in the Premier League – to snatch a 1–0 victory.

Following another international break, Middlesbrough's next game was at home to Chelsea. Both sides were missing first-team players, but the quality of Chelsea's reserves showed as they outclassed Boro and ran out 5–0 victors. Hoyte was ruled out injured before the game and so Grounds covered at right-back, while Alves started the game on the bench. The home side were just a goal behind going into half-time, but four goals in twenty-two minutes after the break left Boro dejected, including an own goal from Wheater that was originally credited to Salomon Kalou. John Johnson came on to make his debut as a substitute for Grounds around the hour mark on a "horrendous day" for his club.

Middlesbrough next travelled to Ewood Park, looking for their second away win in a row. The away side were boosted by the return of Pogatetz and Tuncay from suspension and injury respectively, although Mido picked up an injury on the morning of the game. Although Blackburn had plenty of chances, the first fell to Boro's Aliadière, who hit the bar early on, while Tuncay had a goal wrongly ruled out for offside. Afonso Alves smashed the ball past Paul Robinson on 74 minutes, while Marvin Emnes finally made his Premier League debut after 84. Once again though, Boro conceded a late goal as the home side levelled the game at 1–1 three minutes into injury time.

Looking for a much improved performance after their last home game, the midweek game versus Manchester City provided the response that both fans and manager were looking for. City had plenty of possession and chances but Ross Turnbull kept his first home clean sheet of the season. Afonso Alves made it two goals in two games after converting a penalty – Boro's 6000th league goal. There was also a welcome surprise in stoppage time as Boro made it 2–0 with a late goal courtesy of Gary O'Neil – his first for the club.

=== November ===
Middlesbrough came back from a goal down against West Ham United in their next game to draw the game at 1–1. West Ham dominated much of the game before tactical substitutions from manager Gareth Southgate improved the home side's performance and led to substitute Mido getting Boro's goal – his fifth of the season – late in the second half.

An Aston Villa side looking to move into the Champions League spots on their home ground were Middlesbrough's next opponents. Boro gained two goals through defensive mistakes, with Tuncay converting them both, but they weren't the only chances they had, as Alves missed a sitter from three yards out. Villa levelled the game three minutes after Boro's first goal but the visitors won it 2–1 two minutes from the end of normal time.

Both Everton and Middlesbrough went into the next match on the back of a four-game unbeaten run, and both sides came out of it with their unbeaten runs intact after a 1–1 draw at Goodison Park. Gary O'Neil got his second goal of the season after just eight minutes to put the visitors ahead, but Boro old-boy Yakubu brought Everton level midway through the second half.

The club's unbeaten run came to a disappointing end after a poor home display against Bolton Wanderers. Middlesbrough found themselves two goals down after ten minutes, but had a number of chances to try to get back into the game. Pogatetz got a goal back for the home side after 77 minutes, but just 63 seconds later, Bolton scored their third to wrap up a 3–1 win. When Taylor was substituted during the game, he and a supporter got into an angry exchange of words, a situation for which Taylor later apologised.

Next up came the Tyne-Tees derby match at home to Newcastle United. Both sides had chances to win the match but neither one took them, as the game ended in a 0–0 draw. The match was marred for the second year running by racist abusive chanting aimed at Boro striker Mido. Two men were later arrested after being identified by CCTV cameras. One man pleaded guilty to the offence and was fined, while another pleaded not guilty and is awaiting a hearing. Both Middlesbrough and The FA were disappointed by the decision not to issue a banning order, though the club did ban the individual from the ground.

=== December ===
Nick Barmby marked his 500th career appearance against one of his former clubs as Middlesbrough visited Hull City for the first ever top-flight match between the two sides. Hull lined up with former Boro captain George Boateng in midfield after his departure during the summer. The previous four league meetings between the two sides had all ended in 0–0 draws, and it looked like the match was heading for another until Tuncay opened the scoring on 79 minutes. Boro's lead didn't last long however, as Bernard Mendy's shot hit the post and rebounded off of goalkeeper Ross Turnbull to go down as an own goal. It got worse for the visitors as just a few minutes later, Hull were awarded a soft penalty when Wheater tangled with Geovanni – a challenge which also saw the Middlesbrough defender receive a red card. TV replays showed that Geovanni was offside when the ball was played to him, but nothing was awarded by the assistant referee. Marlon King converted the penalty to give Hull a 2–1 victory.

With Wheater suspended, and both Taylor and Hoyte out injured, Middlesbrough had to field a patched-up back four for their home game versus Arsenal, with Tony McMahon returning to the starting line-up after a long time out with injuries, alongside Huth and Riggott, both of whom were returning from injury. There was also a start for Adam Johnson on the right hand side of midfield, as Alves was dropped to the bench. Emmanuel Adebayor put Arsenal into the lead after quarter of an hour, but Aliadière got on the end of a wonderful cross from Tuncay to head home the equaliser twelve minutes later. The home side were then denied a penalty when Johnson was brought down in the box, but the referee didn't award anything. Both sides had further chances but the game ended 1–1.

Middlesbrough produced their worst away performance of the season thus far against Fulham, as they slumped to a 3–0 defeat. Julio Arca was lucky not to be red-carded for a late over-the-top challenge on Andy Johnson, earning only a yellow card. Jimmy Bullard got the opening goal after Turnbull could only parry Bobby Zamora's shot. Next, for the third time in three games, a penalty decision went against Boro, as Tony McMahon was adjudged to have handled the ball after the ball struck his arm from close range. Turnbull guessed the right way but was unable to save Danny Murphy's penalty kick. Clint Dempsey got the third to round off Fulham's win.

An improved performance was expected but didn't come on Boxing Day, when Everton visited the Riverside Stadium. Middlesbrough rarely troubled the visitors, but striker-less Everton could still only manage a 1–0 win.

The performance finally improved but the result stayed the same when Middlesbrough went to Old Trafford, where Matthew Bates started a Middlesbrough game for the first time since the end of the 2005–06 season. Manchester United boss Alex Ferguson had spoken before the game, hoping to banish the rift that existed between the two clubs. Things probably weren't helped when Pogatetz, defending a corner, put his hands around the back of Cristiano Ronaldo's neck a corner and the United player went down, claiming a penalty. The spat continued when the players walked off the pitch for half time. Dimitar Berbatov's goal was the decisive moment in the game when he fired home to give his side a 1–0 victory, and left Middlesbrough hovering above the relegation zone on goal difference and without a win in eight games.

=== January ===
When league football returned to the Riverside for the derby clash with Sunderland, a lot had happened in the interim. The club had recorded an overdue victory – against Barrow in the FA Cup (see FA Cup section), with Afonso Alves getting back amongst the goals, while the transfer window had seen Stewart Downing's transfer request rejected along with offers from Tottenham, while Portsmouth's moves for Gary O'Neil had all been rebuffed. Josh Walker made his full league debut, starting in central midfield – more than two years after his substitute appearance in the last game of 2005–06, and Downing played centrally, supporting Alves. Downing and Alves linked up well to put Boro ahead before half time. The central midfield partnership of Walker and Digard were both forced off with injuries picked up from opposition challenges, meaning Matthew Bates was pushed into an unfamiliar central midfield role. Sunderland pressed more and more in the second half, and got their equaliser courtesy of Kenwyne Jones. The visitors could have gone on to win the game but Adam Johnson made a backheeled clearance off the goal line, and McMahon won a last-ditch tackle on Djibril Cissé after he was put through on goal on the stroke of full-time. The 1–1 draw extended Boro's winless run to nine games.

The winless run entered double figures when Middlesbrough went down 3–0 away to West Bromwich Albion. Injuries to Pogatetz and Walker meant a reshuffle in both defense and midfield, and after just four minutes Boro were behind. The defense appealed in vain for offside as Chris Brunt fired home a heavily deflected shot. Another deflection saw Robert Koren's strike roll past Ross Turnbull to put the home side two goals up early in the second half. It got worse for the visitors had Didier Digard sent off for appearing to jump into a challenge on Borja Valero. Koren got his second goal not long after to add to Boro's misery. West Brom's win over Boro, added to their win earlier in the season, meant they completed their first ever Premier League double. The Middlesbrough players reaction to Digard's sending off lead to The FA charging the club with failing to control their players. A handful of Boro players surrounded referee Mark Halsey to protest as he tried to push Digard off of the pitch, with Halsey dropping one of his cards as a result. Middlesbrough finally dropped into the relegation zone following Tottenham's victory over Portsmouth the following day.

Middlesbrough went into their next game following a cup win away at Wolverhampton Wanderers, but that didn't signal a change in fortunes in the league. Set pieces were once again the side's undoing. Away at Chelsea's Stamford Bridge, Middlesbrough started with new loan signing Marlon King as sole striker, with five men in midfield. Boro held out until 58 minutes into the game, when Salomon Kalou put his side ahead. He got his second on 81 minutes, condemning Middlesbrough to a 2–0 defeat.

Gareth Southgate elected to make changes for the home tie versus relegation rivals Blackburn Rovers. Brad Jones returned for his first league start since the opening day of the season as Ross Turnbull was dropped to the bench, while the side featured five centre backs – Wheater, Huth, Riggott and Pogatetz at the back, while Matthew Bates once again operating in central midfield alongside the quickly recovered Josh Walker. The set-up allowed Middlesbrough to gain their first clean sheet for two months, but limited themselves to a solitary shot on target over the course of the game. The 0–0 draw earned Boro a point but they fell to 19th in the table, with Blackburn joining them in the relegation zone in 18th, following Stoke's victory over Manchester City.

=== February ===
A trip to the City of Manchester Stadium for Saturday's early kick-off was next on Middlesbrough's agenda. Manchester City's new signing Shay Given made a solid debut, denying Afonso Alves with four fine saves. Both sides had chances throughout the game but City were the only one to convert – Craig Bellamy's shot across goal went between Robert Huth's legs and beyond the reach of Brad Jones into the corner of the net.

Boro's defense remained solid when Wigan came to the Riverside Stadium, but continued to struggle in attack. A line-up unchanged from the midweek FA Cup draw with West Ham was forced into a change midway through the first half. Summer departure Lee Cattermole's strong-but-fair challenge on Didier Digard forced the midfielder off with injuries to both legs that would likely rule him out for the remainder of the season. Neither side could muster enough chances for a goal and the game ended 0–0. Middlesbrough's dire run stretched to fourteen games without a win, with only one goal in nine games. A letter from the club's Safety Officer, Sue Watson, was handed out to supporters in block 53A. It was intended to ask supporters to refrain from constantly standing and to stop banging on the plastic sheeting on the back of the stand, but its bad wording caused much anger among fans who interpreted it as asking them to sit down and be quiet. The club was forced to apologise to the fans and clarify the confusion.

A victory in their FA Cup fifth-round replay sent Middlesbrough into the home match with Liverpool with optimism that their disastrous run of form in the league would finally come to an end, and their hopes came true. Liverpool were riding high in second place, while Boro began the day in second bottom. A stroke of luck put the home side ahead as Xabi Alonso diverted the ball into his own net from a corner. Tuncay doubled the advantage in the second half, and they could have had more as the visitors left themselves open at the back as they tried to find a way back. Brad Jones kept a fourth consecutive home clean sheet and Boro moved out of the relegation zone with their 2–0 win, while Liverpool had now failed to win at the Riverside for seven seasons.

=== March ===
Middlesbrough were brought back down to Earth with a big loss away to Tottenham Hotspur. The home side came into the game on the back of a Carling Cup final defeat, while Boro remained unchanged. The mood was set within the first fifteen minutes as Robbie Keane and Roman Pavlyuchenko gave the home side an early two-goal lead, while Aaron Lennon made it three five minutes before half time. Tuncay twice had the ball in the back of the net but both times he was caught narrowly offside. Lennon got his second goal of the game late in the second half to condemn Boro to a heavy 4–0 defeat.

Fellow relegation-battlers Portsmouth were next up as they visited the Riverside Stadium. Middlesbrough were caught napping at a corner on the half-hour mark and Peter Crouch put the visitors ahead. The second half saw Boro dominate the game but once more spurned plenty of chances. Things got worse as Matthew Bates was sent off after picking up a second yellow card when he was adjudged to have dived in the penalty area. Four minutes into injury time, Marlon King grabbed his first Middlesbrough goal as volleyed in from close range. Alves had a chance to hand Boro a win with the last kick of the game as he was through on goal but David James saved his shot and the game ended 1–1. Towards the end of the game, before the equaliser, some fans began to chant "we've only got one player", referring to Tuncay's efforts compared to his teammates. Southgate came out to say he was unhappy with the chant, calling it "disrespectful" and saying "we survive as a club and as a town by everyone pulling together."

Middlesbrough next visited Stoke City's Britannia Stadium in another important game. Like much of the season, the team once again failed to score. As expected, Rory Delap's throw-in's were Stoke's main offensive weapon. Although they dealt with most of them well, Ryan Shawcross headed one home on 84 minutes, giving them a vital 1–0 win over their relegation rivals. The loss left Middlesbrough four points from safety, with the battle against relegation taking its toll on the club's morale.

=== April ===
April began as March had ended with a defeat, this time at the hands of Bolton Wanderers at the Reebok Stadium. Middlesbrough's Gary O'Neil had cancelled out Bolton's opener to make the scores 1–1 but bad defending saw the home side score three more. The 4–1 defeat left Boro languishing in 19th place, five points from safety.

The home tie against Hull was labelled as a "must-win" tie as they battled to avoid relegation. Middlesbrough got off to a perfect start as Tuncay opened the scoring after just three minutes, but Hull quickly hit back through Manucho. Boro regained the lead after Matthew Bates scored his first ever goal for the club, stabbing home from a corner. All three vital points were secured after a defensive slip by former Boro captain George Boateng let Marlon King in to make the score 3–1. Results later that day left Boro in 19th place but they were now only two points from safety.

Another home tie followed a week later, and Boro did everything but score against a Fulham side featuring former Boro keeper Mark Schwarzer in goal. The keeper kept out several good efforts but his side's steady defence frustrated the home side and meant the game ended 0–0.

Middlesbrough's dire away form continued at the Emirates Stadium as a Cesc Fàbregas double condemned them to a 2–0 defeat, a club record tenth straight away loss. Boro had reason to complain about the opening goal when an offside player was interfering with the goalkeeper's view, but the visitors failed to really test the opposition goal.

=== May ===
Despite Middlesbrough's placing in the relegation zone, they went into the home tie against Manchester United unbeaten at home in 2009. Jérémie Aliadière had an early low shot saved by Ben Foster, but other than that failed to threaten a United side who rested several key players in preparation for their upcoming UEFA Champions League match. Ryan Giggs and Park Ji-Sung scored the visitors' goals and left Boro still entrenched in the relegation battle.

The "must-win" game at relegation rivals Newcastle's St James' Park was likely to determine both sides' chances of avoiding the drop. Tuncay's early shot rebounded off of the Newcastle keeper and then off Habib Beye, who put the ball into his own net for an own goal, giving the visitors the lead after just three minutes. Steven Taylor brought the scores level six minutes later as Boro conceded another poorly defended corner. The game was close, with both sides having several good opportunities, before substitute Obafemi Martins scored for Newcastle straight after coming on. Peter Løvenkrands settled the game as he put in his side's third goal. The 3–1 win was Alan Shearer's first as Newcastle manager and Middlesbrough's eleventh away defeat in a row. With Middlesbrough three points from safety, and a considerable inferior goal difference with just two games to go, relegation looked even more likely.

A great escape looked on the cards when Middlesbrough went a goal up at home to Aston Villa in their penultimate game of the season, courtesy of an overhead kick from Tuncay. Boro were dealt a huge blow however, when Stewart Downing was brought down under a challenge from Stiliyan Petrov, and needed treatment. He was able to briefly continue before needing to be substituted. John Carew brought Villa level when Boro failed to get started again in the second half. The visitors looked most likely to score again as they continued to press forward, while Boro needed to get forward themselves in their relegation fight. The game eventually ended in a 1–1 draw, with Boro needing a miracle in the final game to avoid the drop.

In order to stay in the top flight, Middlesbrough needed relegation rivals Newcastle and Hull City to lose, while they needed a five-goal swing to Hull in goal difference. Stewart Downing's injury kept him out of a Premier League game for the first time since November 2006, also throwing doubt on a possible summer transfer, and Tuncay captained the side. Boro had to go for it, but instead they fell behind. Gary O'Neil temporarily brought his side level, but they again conceded and lost 2–1. With Newcastle and Hull both losing, the opportunity to escape was there for Middlesbrough, but they had failed to take it. Their twelfth consecutive away defeat extended the club record, and equalled a Premier League one, and saw their eleven-year run in the top flight ended, with the club needing to prepare for the next season in the Football League Championship.

=== Results ===
Win Draw Loss

Note: Results are given with Middlesbrough score listed first. Man of the Match is according to mfc.co.uk.

Game	Date	Venue	Opponent	Result F–A	Attendance	Boro Goalscorers	Man of the Match
1	16 August 2008	H	Tottenham Hotspur	2–1	32,623	Wheater 71', Mido 86'	Wheater
2	23 August 2008	A	Liverpool	1–2	43,168	Mido 70'	O'Neil
3	30 August 2008	H	Stoke City	2–1	27,627	Alves 37', Tuncay 85'	Huth
4	13 September 2008	A	Portsmouth	1–2	19,425	Mido 24'	Turnbull
5	20 September 2008	A	Sunderland	0–2	38,388		Turnbull
6	27 September 2008	H	West Bromwich Albion	0–1	26,248		Huth
7	4 October 2008	A	Wigan Athletic	1–0	16,806	Aliadière 89'	Riggott
8	18 October 2008	H	Chelsea	0–5	29,221		Not awarded
9	25 October 2008	A	Blackburn Rovers	1–1	17,606	Alves 74'	Pogatetz
10	29 October 2008	H	Manchester City	2–0	25,731	Alves 53' (pen.), O'Neil 90+4'	Turnbull
11	1 November 2008	H	West Ham United	1–1	25,164	Mido 82'	Riggott
12	9 November 2008	A	Aston Villa	2–1	36,672	Tuncay 34', 88'	Tuncay
13	16 November 2008	A	Everton	1–1	31,063	O'Neil 8'	Digard
14	22 November 2008	H	Bolton Wanderers	1–3	24,487	Pogatetz 77'	Downing
15	29 November 2008	H	Newcastle United	0–0	32,160		Downing
16	6 December 2008	A	Hull City	1–2	24,912	Tuncay 79'	Pogatetz
17	13 December 2008	H	Arsenal	1–1	27,320	Aliadière 29'	Turnbull
18	20 December 2008	A	Fulham	0–3	23,722		Downing
19	26 December 2008	H	Everton	0–1	30,253		Riggott
20	29 December 2008	A	Manchester United	0–1	75,294		Bates
21	10 January 2009	H	Sunderland	1–1	29,310	Alves 45'	Wheater
22	17 January 2009	A	West Bromwich Albion	0–3	25,557		Downing
23	28 January 2009	A	Chelsea	0–2	40,280		Downing
24	31 January 2009	H	Blackburn Rovers	0–0	24,303		Jones
25	7 February 2009	A	Manchester City	0–1	40,558		Jones
26	21 February 2009	H	Wigan Athletic	0–0	24,020		Wheater
27	28 February 2009	H	Liverpool	2–0	33,724	Alonso (o.g.) 32', Tuncay 63'	The whole team
28	4 March 2009	A	Tottenham Hotspur	0–4	35,761		Wheater
29	14 March 2009	H	Portsmouth	1–1	24,281	King 90+4'	Downing
30	21 March 2009	A	Stoke City	0–1	26,440		Huth
31	4 April 2009	A	Bolton Wanderers	1–4	20,819	O'Neill 38'	Tuncay
32	11 April 2009	H	Hull City	3–1	32,255	Tuncay 3', Bates 29', King 90'	Downing
33	18 April 2009	H	Fulham	0–0	30,389		Tuncay
34	26 April 2009	A	Arsenal	0–2	60,089		Wheater
35	2 May 2009	H	Manchester United	0–2	33,767		Huth
36	11 May 2009	A	Newcastle United	1–3	51,252	Beye (o.g.) 3'	O'Neil
37	16 May 2009	H	Aston Villa	1–1	27,261	Tuncay 14'	Tuncay
38	24 May 2009	A	West Ham United	1–2	34,007	O'Neil 50'	Not awarded

=== Final league table ===
Pos	Team	Pld	W	D	L	GF	GA	GD	Pts	Qualification or relegation
16	Sunderland	38	9	9	20	34	54	−20	36	
17	Hull City	38	8	11	19	39	64	−25	35	
18	Newcastle United (R)	38	7	13	18	40	59	−19	34	Relegation to Football League Championship
19	Middlesbrough (R)	38	7	11	20	28	57	−29	32	Relegation to Football League Championship
20	West Bromwich Albion (R)	38	8	8	22	36	67	−31	32	Relegation to Football League Championship

Source: Barclays Premier League
Rules for classification: 1) points; 2) goal difference; 3) number of goals scored.
(R) Relegated

== League Cup ==
The draw for the second round of the League Cup saw Middlesbrough handed a historic game versus League One side Yeovil Town – the game being the first ever competitive meeting between the two clubs. It turned out to be a comfortable victory for the home side. Gareth Southgate fielded a slightly weakened side, though handed Marvin Emnes his debut, along with first starts for Justin Hoyte and Didier Digard. Mido made his record three goals in three games after he opened the scoring, before Digard got his first goal for the club. Jérémie Aliadière added the third before Gavin Tomlin pulled one back for Yeovil. Emnes got a goal on his debut just after half-time, then Adam Johnson got the final goal to make it 5–1. Meanwhile, there was a full debut for Rhys Williams and a home debut for Josh Walker as they both came on as substitutes.

Middlesbrough were handed a tough away tie against Manchester United for the third round. Brad Jones started in goal in place of Ross Turnbull, while Robert Huth was rested. Cristiano Ronaldo was making his first start of the season for United, and marked it with the opening goal. Substitute Adam Johnson put Boro level, before Emanuel Pogatetz was sent off for a rash challenge on Rodrigo Possebon. Ryan Giggs and Nani made it a 3–1 win for the home side.

=== Results ===
Win Loss

Note: Results are given with Middlesbrough score listed first. Man of the Match is according to mfc.co.uk.

Round	Date	Venue	Opponent	Result F–A	Attendance	Boro Goalscorers	Man of the Match
2	26 August 2008	H	Yeovil Town	5–1	15,651	Mido 11', Digard 23', Aliadière 32', Emnes 47', A.Johnson 66'	Digard
3	23 September 2008	A	Manchester United	1–3	53,729	A.Johnson 56'	Jones

== FA Cup ==
Middlesbrough were drawn at home to non-league Barrow in the third-round of the FA Cup. Middlesbrough went into the game without a win in eight league games. They named a strong line-up while giving Josh Walker his first Boro start as he lined up in the centre of midfield. The game saw Middlesbrough dominate in chances, but poor finishing meant they only won 2–1, with both of the home side's goals coming from Afonso Alves – his first goals for over two months – and both assisted by Stewart Downing. Middlesbrough's failures in front of goal meant they got a late scare as Barrow pulled a goal back after more bad defending at a set piece, but they failed to take a chance to level the game late on. A sour moment of the game saw Jérémie Aliadière injured and ruled out for two months.

Boro still hadn't registered a league win by the time their fourth round tie came around, while their opponents Wolverhampton Wanderers sat top of the Football League Championship. Considering the two sides' recent form and with Middlesbrough playing away from home, many pundits were predicting a home win. It was more of a shock then that Middlesbrough were the side to advance through to the fifth round courtesy of a 2–1 victory. Boro winger Adam Johnson spurned several chances before Afonso Alves chipped the goalkeeper on the stroke of half-time. Wolves headed home an equaliser in the second half, but substitute Marvin Emnes fired in off the post seven minutes from time.

Middlesbrough faced an away tie with West Ham United in the fifth round. Stewart Downing's first goal of the season put the visitors ahead midway through the first half, while Afonso Alves spurned several chances to extend their lead. Once again, a set piece was Middlesbrough's downfall, as Hérita Ilunga headed in the home side's equaliser after 83 minutes. The 1–1 draw meant a replay would be played at the Riverside Stadium.

The replay was played in front of a small but very vocal Boro crowd who were fired up by an unfortunately worded letter from the club seemingly asking them to sit down and be quiet in their last home game. The fans didn't have to wait long for a goal as in the fifth minute Stewart Downing curled an unstoppable free-kick over the wall and into the top-right hand corner of the net. Tuncay doubled the lead with a volley as West Ham's defense failed to clear the ball. The visitors dominated the possession but could not convert it to goals, and with Middlesbrough threatening on the counterattack, they couldn't afford to neglect their defensive duties. In the end, the 2–0 was enough to see Middlesbrough through to the last eight for the fourth consecutive season.

Middlesbrough faced Everton in the sixth round. Boro were unchanged for a fourth successive game coming into the match and were the better side in the first half. David Wheater rose to head home a Matthew Bates cross on the stroke of half time to send them in at half time as the happier side. Everton's assistant manager, and former Middlesbrough coach, Steve Round gave an angry team-talk to his side at half time which fired his side into a much better second half performance. It took only five minutes for Everton to get an equaliser – Marouane Fellaini heading home over a stranded Brad Jones. Six minutes later, Louis Saha scored Everton's second. Middlesbrough did little to threaten for the rest of the tie. The 2–1 defeat left Gareth Southgate lamenting his side's inability to see matches out.

=== Results ===
Win Draw Loss

Note: Results are given with Middlesbrough score listed first. Man of the Match is according to mfc.co.uk.

Round	Date	Venue	Opponent	Result F–A	Attendance	Boro Goalscorers	Man of the Match
3	3 January 2009	H	Barrow	2–1	25,132	Alves (2) 23', 62'	Downing
4	24 January 2009	A	Wolverhampton Wanderers	2–1	18,013	Alves 44', Emnes 83'	Downing
5	14 February 2009	A	West Ham United	1–1	33,658	Downing 22'	Digard
5R	25 February 2009	H	West Ham United	2–0	15,602	Downing 5', Tuncay 20'	Downing
6	8 March 2009	A	Everton	1–2	37,856	Wheater 44'	Bates

== Reserves ==
The Middlesbrough Reserves are competing in the 11-team 2008–09 Premier Reserve League Northern division, as well as the Central League Cup.

=== Appearances and goals ===
Appearance and goalscoring records for all the players who played in Middlesbrough F.C. reserve team fixtures during the 2008–09 season.

No.	Pos	Nat	Player	Total		Premier Reserve League		Central League Cup		North Riding Senior Cup	
No.	Pos	Nat	Player	Apps	Goals	Apps	Goals	Apps	Goals	Apps	Goals
20	MF	(Argentina) ARG	Julio Arca	1	0	1	0	0	0	0	0
26	DF	(England) ENG	Matthew Bates	5	0	4	0	1	0	0	0
34	DF	(England) ENG	Joe Bennett	7	1	5	0	2	1	0	0
	DF	(England) ENG	Ashley Corker	8	0	8	0	0	0	0	0
42	FW	(England) ENG	Tom Craddock	4	7	4	7	0	0	0	0
	MF	(England) ENG	James Cronesberry	4	0	4	0	0	0	0	0
11	FW	(Netherlands) NED	Marvin Emnes	4	1	3	0	1	1	0	0
37	FW	(England) ENG	Jonathan Franks	7	2	6	0	1	2	0	0
	DF	(England) ENG	Theo Furness	3	1	2	0	1	1	0	0
	MF	(England) ENG	James Gray	2	0	0	0	2	0	0	0
40	DF	(England) ENG	Jonathan Grounds	4	0	2	0	2	0	0	0
	MF	(England) ENG	Jonathan Harris	1	0	1	0	0	0	0	0
38	DF	(England) ENG	Seb Hines	7	0	6	0	1	0	0	0
28	MF	(England) ENG	Adam Johnson	1	0	0	0	1	0	0	0
36	DF	(England) ENG	John Johnson	7	0	5	0	2	0	0	0
22	GK	(Australia) AUS	Brad Jones	2	0	2	0	0	0	0	0
	GK	(England) ENG	David Knight	3	0	1	0	2	0	0	0
	FW	(England) ENG	Gary Martin	6	1	4	1	2	0	0	0
29	DF	(England) ENG	Tony McMahon	1	0	1	0	0	0	0	0
	MF	(Netherlands) NED	Patrick Otte	1	0	0	0	1	0	0	0
35	MF	(England) ENG	Graeme Owens	4	0	4	0	0	0	0	0
33	FW	(England) ENG	Nathan Porritt	9	1	8	1	1	0	0	0
5	DF	(England) ENG	Chris Riggott	2	0	2	0	0	0	0	0
	DF	(England) ENG	Jordan Robinson	1	0	1	0	0	0	0	0
	DF	(Canada) CAN	Shaun Saiko	7	1	5	0	2	1	0	0
	DF	(England) ENG	Phil Shead	3	0	1	0	2	0	0	0
	MF	(England) ENG	Richard Smallwood	9	1	7	1	2	0	0	0
32	GK	(England) ENG	Jason Steele	5	0	5	0	0	0	0	0
41	MF	(England) ENG	Josh Walker	10	0	8	0	2	0	0	0
	DF	(England) ENG	Paul Weldon	1	0	0	0	1	0	0	0

=== Premier Reserve League results ===
Win Draw Loss

Note: Results are given with Middlesbrough score listed first. Man of the Match is according to mfc.co.uk.

Game	Date	Venue	Opponent	Result F–A	Attendance	Boro Goalscorers	Man of the Match
1	2 September 2008	H	Liverpool Reserves	0–1			Riggott
2	16 September 2008	H	Hull City Reserves	2–2		Craddock (2)	J.Johnson
3	30 September 2008	H	Sunderland Reserves	4–2	646	Hartley (o.g.), Craddock (3)	Craddock
4	7 October 2008	A	Everton Reserves	2–2		Craddock (2)	Bennett
5	21 October 2008	H	Newcastle United Reserves	1–4		Smallwood	Bennett
6	4 November 2008	A	Wigan Athletic Reserves	1–2		Martin	Smallwood
7	9 December 2008	A	Manchester City Reserves	1–3		Mee (o.g.)	Bates
8	16 December 2008	H	Blackburn Rovers Reserves	1–0	266	Porritt	Porritt

=== Central League Cup results ===
Despite competing in the Premier Reserve League, Middlesbrough entered the Central League Cup (known as the Totesportcasino.com League Cup for sponsorship reasons) for extra games.

Win Draw Loss

Note: Results are given with Middlesbrough score listed first. Man of the Match is according to mfc.co.uk.

Round	Date	Venue	Opponent	Result F–A	Attendance	Boro Goalscorers	Man of the Match
Group 2	11 November 2008	H	Sheffield Wednesday Reserves	5–0	253	Franks (2), Emnes, Saiko, Bennett	Bennett
Group 2	18 November 2008	A	Bradford City Reserves	1–1		Furness	Walker

== Staff ==
Prior to the season, a shake-up in the medical department saw Scotsman Frank Nuttall, previously of Rangers and England, arrive as the new head of physical development, allowing Nick Allamby to leave his previous post of sports therapist and become a full-time conditioning coach.

First team coach Steve Harrison left the club in early July following seven years at the club. Steve Agnew stepped up from being Reserve team coach to replace Harrison, while Academy coach Martin Scott took over as new Reserve team coach.

Former midfielder Mark Proctor, who had also had prior spells as a Reserve and youth coach with the club, returned to Middlesbrough as under-18 coach during mid-September.

Key: Held role for full season Appointed to role mid-season Left role mid-season

Executive members
Role	Person
Chairman	(England) Steve Gibson
Chief Executive	(England) Keith Lamb
Chief Operating Officer	(England) Neil Bausor
Chief Financial Officer	(England) Alan Bage

Senior team management
Role	Person
Manager	(England) Gareth Southgate
Assistant manager	(England) Malcolm Crosby
First team coach	(England) Colin Cooper
First team coach	(England) Steve Agnew
Reserve team coach	(England) Martin Scott
Goalkeeping coach	(England) Stephen Pears

Academy team management
Role	Person
Academy manager	(England) Dave Parnaby
Academy coach	(England) Mark Proctor
Academy coach	(England) Craig Hignett
Academy coach	(England) Kevin Scott

Medical
Role	Person
Head of medical	(England) Grant Downie
Head of sports science	(England) Chris Barnes
Head of physical development	(Scotland) Frank Nuttall
Conditioning coach	(England) Nick Allamby
Senior physiotherapist	(England) Chris Moseley

Recruitment
Role	Person
Head of senior recruitment	(England) Dave Leadbeater
First team scout	(Scotland) Gordon McQueen
First team scout	(England) David Mills
Head of Academy recruitment	(England) Ron Bone

== Other events ==
=== Compensation case ===
On 11 August 2008 it was announced that former Manchester United youngster Ben Collett, who five years earlier had a "career-ending" injury as a result of a tackle in a game versus Middlesbrough's reserves, had been awarded more than £4.5 million in compensation. The fee would be paid by Middlesbrough's insurers. An appeal against the ruling, heard in June, failed.

=== Debt reduction ===
Middlesbrough's debts, reported to be around £85–90 million, were cut by two-thirds over the summer following relegation. The reduction would leave the club in a healthier financial position and better placed for the Football League Championship, though Steve Gibson announced the debt reduction before relegation was confirmed and denied relegation was part of a cost-cutting plan.
