= Bulkhaul Limited =

Transportation company

Bulkhaul Limited is a British company specialising in global tank transportation of bulk liquids, powders. It was established in 1981 by Steve Gibson in Middlesbrough, North Yorkshire. Bulkhaul Limited is run under the holding company Gibson O'Neill owned by Gibson and Michael O'Neill. Bulkhaul ceased manufacturing at its Teesside base in 2002, although it retained its main base of operations in Middlesbrough.

== History ==
In 1981, Steve Gibson, only 22 years old at the time, borrowed £1000 from his father to found the company.

== Bases ==
Bulkhaul's main office is in Middlesbrough. The company also has offices throughout mainland Europe, South America, North America, and Asia.
