= Keith Lamb (executive) =

English football executive (1946–2024)

- Born: 27 October 1946
- Died: 4 January 2024 (aged 77)

Keith Lamb (27 October 1946 – 4 January 2024) was an English local league footballer and chartered accountant, who was the Chief Executive at Middlesbrough F.C. He left this post in May 2011 for unknown reasons, but stayed at the club in a new role of Non-Executive Director to Chairman Steve Gibson.

Lamb considered the move from Ayresome Park to the Riverside Stadium one of the most significant events during his time at Middlesbrough F.C.

Lamb was instrumental in bringing famous names to Middlesbrough's Riverside Stadium, such as Juninho, Ravanelli (The White Feather), Emerson, Bryan Robson and Paul Gascoigne.

Some have claimed that Lamb and club Chairman Steve Gibson were part of a consortium that rescued the club from extinction in 1986, after they fell into serious financial difficulty but Steve Gibson was a small part of a consortium led by Colin Henderson, representing ICI, Lamb was not, he applied for an accounting job with MFC after the club had been saved, he was working for a radio company at the time as an accountant.

During Lamb's tenure, Middlesbrough invested heavily in youth development, developing the Rockliffe Park facility in Hurworth to rival the leading Academies across Europe. When it was opened, it was the number one facility in the UK, and inspired other Premier League clubs to develop their Academies. The youth Academy has since produced Premier League players such as Lee Cattermole, Ross Turnbull, David Wheater, Chris Brunt, Stuart Parnaby and England internationals Stewart Downing and Adam Johnson.

Lamb died on 4 January 2024, at the age of 77.
