= Josh Walker (footballer, born 1989) =

British footballer (born 1989)

Personal information
- Full name: Joshua Walker
- Date of birth: 21 February 1989 (age 37)
- Place of birth: Newcastle upon Tyne, England
- Height: 1.81 m (5 ft 11 in)
- Position: Central defender

Youth career
- 2002–2006: Middlesbrough

Senior career*
Years	Team	Apps	(Gls)
2006–2010	Middlesbrough	8	(0)
2007	→ AFC Bournemouth (loan)	6	(0)
2008	→ Aberdeen (loan)	8	(1)
2009–2010	→ Northampton Town (loan)	1	(0)
2010	→ Rotherham United (loan)	15	(3)
2010–2012	Watford	6	(0)
2010	→ Stevenage (loan)	1	(0)
2011	→ Northampton Town (loan)	19	(0)
2011	→ Stevenage (loan)	5	(1)
2012	→ Scunthorpe United (loan)	18	(3)
2012–2013	Scunthorpe United	23	(0)
2013–2014	Gateshead	30	(5)
2014–2016	Bengaluru FC	17	(2)
2017–2019	Edinburgh City	43	(5)
2020–2021	Tranent Juniors		
2021–2022	Whitehill Welfare		
2022–2023	Dunbar United		
Total		238	(23)

International career
2009	England U20	4	(0)
- * Club domestic league appearances and goals as of 18:19, 22 May 2025 (UTC)

Joshua Walker (born 21 February 1989) is a retired English footballer who used to play as a defender or midfielder most notably for Middlesbrough. Now retired, he has become a football coach for Scottish non-league side Whitehill Welfare.

Walker started his career at Middlesbrough, progressing through the club's youth academy and was part of the club's FA Youth Cup winning team in 2004. He subsequently made his first-team debut for Middlesbrough in 2006, and made a handful of appearances during his four-year professional tenure at the club. During his time at Middlesbrough, Walker was loaned out on four occasions, playing for Football League clubs in the form of AFC Bournemouth, Northampton Town, and Rotherham United respectively, as well as Scottish Premier League club Aberdeen.

Walker joined Championship side Watford on a free transfer in August 2010. He made four appearances for Watford, before joining Stevenage on loan in November 2010. He was subsequently loaned out to Northampton Town in January 2011, Stevenage in August 2011 and Scunthorpe United in January 2012. In April 2012, Walker agreed a permanent move to Scunthorpe United and signed for the team on 1 July.

After playing for non-league Gateshead between 2013 and 2014, he joined Indian club Bengaluru FC as the club's marquee signing. Walker has represented England in various youth levels and has also captained the team at 2009 FIFA U-20 World Cup.

== Club career ==
=== Middlesbrough ===
Josh Walker was born on 21 February 1989 in Newcastle upon Tyne and graduated from Middlesbrough's youth academy. Having been part of Middlesbrough's FA Youth Cup winning team of 2003–04, Walker made his team debut, scoring the final goal in a 4–2 friendly victory over Carlisle United in July 2005. His league debut came on the last game of the 2005–06 season, when Middlesbrough fielded a team largely filled with academy graduates in a 1–0 defeat to Fulham, where he came as a 62nd-minute substitute for Malcolm Christie.

During the 2008–09 season, Walker came on as a substitute in Middlesbrough's 5–1 home win over Yeovil Town in the League Cup. In January 2009, he started his first game for the club, playing the whole 90 minutes in the club's 2–1 FA Cup victory against Barrow. His performance led to him starting once more the following week, in a 1–1 draw with Sunderland in the Tees–Wear derby. Just four days later, Walker was ruled out for six weeks after tests showed torn lateral ligaments. In February 2009, after impressing Middlesbrough manager Gareth Southgate, Walker signed a new two-year contracting, keeping him at Middlesbrough until 2011. In total, Walker featured nine times during the club's 2008–09 campaign. The following season, Walker did not play in the first-team until February 2010, when he started in Middlesbrough's 1–0 home win over Peterborough United – after injuries forced Middlesbrough manager Gordon Strachan to play Walker. It was to be his only appearance of the season for the club, and admitted he "could still be on his way out". Walker remained at the club ahead of the 2010–11 season, and he started in their 2–1 away win at Chesterfield in the League Cup. However, ten days later, Walker was allowed to leave the club, and joined fellow Championship side Watford on a free transfer.

==== Loan moves ====
Towards the latter stages of the 2006–07 season, Walker signed on a month's loan for AFC Bournemouth. He made his debut for Bournemouth in a 3–1 away loss at Northampton Town, and played in a further five games as Bournemouth narrowly avoided relegation. He returned to Middlesbrough in April 2007 to see if his future lay at the club, and also expressed an interest in joining Bournemouth if, according to Bournemouth manager Kevin Bond, "Middlesbrough were interested".

Walker joined Aberdeen on 29 January 2008, where he was on loan until the end of the 2007–08 season. It was announced shortly afterwards that he had signed a new one-year contract with Middlesbrough, keeping him at the club until June 2009. Walker scored his first career goal while on loan at Aberdeen on 14 February 2008 against Bayern Munich in the UEFA Cup round of 32. Walker played 13 games in all competitions for Aberdeen, scoring once, before returning to his parent club in May 2008.

On 19 November 2009, Walker joined Northampton Town on loan until January 2010, but this was cut short due to injury. He made just one appearance for the club, playing the whole match in a 2–2 draw at home to Crewe Alexandra.

In February 2010, Walker was loaned to League Two side Rotherham United on an initial month's loan, making his debut in a 1–0 win against Burton Albion at the Pirelli Stadium. He scored his first goal for Rotherham from 25 yards in the club's 2–1 away defeat to Accrington Stanley. Four days later, he was on the scoresheet again, this time scoring the only goal of the game from 25 yards as Rotherham beat Bury 1–0. On 25 March 2010, his loan deal was extended until the end of the 2009–10 season. Walker played 15 times for Rotherham, scoring three goals. He played his last game for the club in a 0–0 draw with Crewe Alexandra, before returning to his parent club in May 2010.

=== Watford ===
In August 2010, Walker signed for Watford on a free transfer, signing a two-year contract, with Watford having the option on a third year. He made his Watford debut a day after joining the club, coming on as a 76th-minute substitute in a 0–0 draw away at Hull City. Walker also came on as a late substitute in three more games in September 2010, including in Watford's 3–1 victory against his former employers, Middlesbrough. Having made just four substitute appearances for Watford, Walker said "If I'm being honest, I expected to do more than I have done at Watford, I still believe I should have played a lot more than I have so far".

Walker returned to Watford ahead of the 2011–12 season, under new management in the form of Sean Dyche. He made his first appearance of the season in Watford's 0–0 away draw against Coventry City, coming on as an 89th-minute substitute. Three days later, on 23 August, Walker started in the club's 1–1 League Cup fixture against Bristol Rovers, a game which the club lost on penalties.

==== Loan moves ====
In November 2010, Walker joined League Two side Stevenage on loan until January 2011. He made his club debut just a day after signing for the club, starting in Stevenage's televised FA Cup tie away at AFC Wimbledon. It was to be a scoring debut for Walker, scoring a free-kick that went in off the post to give Stevenage the lead in a 2–0 victory. He made his first league appearance for Stevenage in the club's 1–0 home loss to Northampton Town in December 2010, a game in which Walker hit the crossbar from a free-kick. Despite being due to stay at Stevenage until the beginning of January 2011, Walker was recalled by his parent club Watford on 23 December, in order to provide cover for the injured Stephen McGinn. Walker made two appearances for Stevenage, scoring one goal, as his loan spell at the club was disrupted by fixture postponements.

Walker re-joined League Two side Northampton Town on loan until the end of the 2010–11 season in January 2011. He had previously played for Northampton during the 2009–10 campaign. He made his second debut for the club on 1 February, playing the whole game as Northampton beat Crewe Alexandra 6–2 at Sixfields. Walker made 19 appearances for Northampton as the club narrowly avoided relegation, finishing five points above the relegation zone.

A week after Walker's first starting appearance of the 2011–12 season, he signed for Stevenage on loan until January 2012. It was announced that Walker's loan deal was made with a view to a permanent move come the January transfer window. He made his second debut for the club on 3 September, coming on as a substitute in a 4–2 home win against Rochdale. Walker scored his first goal for Stevenage during his second spell at the club on 1 October, coming on as a 90th-minute substitute and scoring two minutes later in a 2–1 defeat to Notts County. After making just six substitute appearances for Stevenage in all competitions, Walker's loan spell with the club was cut short, with the player returning to Watford on 17 November 2011. After returning to Watford, manager Graham Westley said Walker's loan spell at Stevenage was the best option for both clubs, saying:

"It didn't really work out for Josh as he would have liked, as I would have liked, He has got a lot of talent as a footballer. He came in and I knew he wasn't going to walk straight into the side but I was hoping he was going to develop and evolve and give us another option down the right-hand side.However, it hasn't quite worked out and he has gone back to his parent club which is the best thing for everybody."

=== Scunthorpe United ===
On 13 January 2012 Walker joined Scunthorpe United on a one-month emergency loan deal. Walker's move to Scunthorpe United permanently was changed to Loan because Fifa's rules which mean players can only play for two clubs in a season apply for standard but not emergency loans. Walker scored on his debut for Scunthorpe United in a 1–1 draw against Colchester United. His debut impressed manager Alan Knill and he told the club official website: "Josh is a good player and fits in well in there. We lost [Manchester United loanee] Oliver Norwood, but we have Josh, who is a bit more streetwise and very good on the ball." On 18 February, Walker scored his second goal and set up a goal for Jon Parkin in a 3–1 win over Leyton Orient. On 20 February, Walker extended his loan spell at Scunthorpe for another month after making five appearances and scoring twice. On 6 March, Walker provided a double assist in the late second half for David Mirfin and Garry Thompson respectively in a 2–1 win over Oldham Athletic. On 31 March, Walker scored his third goal and set up a goal for Jordan Robertson in a 4–1 win over Chesterfield.

On 19 April 2012, Walker signed for the club on a permanent basis on free transfer, which took effect on 1 July. He was injured during the latter part of the 2012–13 season at the end of which his contract would expire.

=== Gateshead ===
Walker signed for Conference Premier side Gateshead on 17 July 2013. He made his debut on 10 August 2013 against Kidderminster Harriers. Walker scored his first goals for the club on 7 September 2013, scoring both goals in a 2–1 home win against Hereford United. He again scored a brace, this time netting in a 3–1 victory against Salisbury City. He scored the final goal for the club against Lincoln City. At the end of the 2013–14 season, Walker was released by the club. He ended the season scoring six goals in 34 matches.

=== Bengaluru ===
On 7 July 2014, Walker signed for reigning I-League champions Bengaluru FC, on a one-year contract qualifying as their club's "marquee player". He said "I am very excited to start this chapter of my career with the champions of India." Walker later asserted that the quality of Indian football was "a lot better than what I imagined". In his first season with the Indian club, the club won the Federation Cup defeating Dempo in the final. On 18 March 2015, he scored his first goal for the club, in an AFC Cup match against Warriors, scoring a penalty in the 36th minute. He scored his first I-League goal, by opening the scoring of a 4–1 victory over Sporting Clube de Goa. Walker extended his contract for a further year with Bengaluru at the end of the season, which will keep him at the club until the end of the 2015–16 I-League season.

In January 2016, Walker was injured during an off season training session, with Goal reporting that it would take five months for him to recover. Missing the first two matches against Salgaocar and Aizawl FC, Bengaluru FC owner Parth Jindal confirmed his injury through his Twitter account. He was subsequently released and replaced by Irish midfielder Michael Collins, his former teammate at Scunthorpe.

=== Edinburgh City ===
On 4 January 2017, Walker, who was still recovering from the injury sustained while playing in India, signed an 18 month long deal with Scottish League Two club Edinburgh City. He scored his first goal for the club in a league match against Montrose in February. The goal was his fifteenth league goal of his career. He said that the goal was one of the better goals of his career. Walker was appointed as the club captain in May. He also signed a contract that was due to keep him with the club until May 2020.

=== Dunbar United ===
After a short spell at Dunbar, the club announced that Walker had retired from football on the 18th of June 2023.

== International career ==
Walker captained the under-15 team for the first time in October 2004 against Wales under-15, and also scored a goal in the match. He captained England's under-16 and under-17 and under-20 teams. He was also England's captain in 2009 FIFA U-20 World Cup.

== Career statistics ==
As of match played on 14 July 2018

Appearances and goals by club, season and competition
Club	Season	League			National Cup		League Cup		Continental		Other		Total	
Club	Season	Division	Apps	Goals	Apps	Goals	Apps	Goals	Apps	Goals	Apps	Goals	Apps	Goals
Middlesbrough	2005–06	Premier League	1	0	0	0	0	0	—		—		1	0
Middlesbrough	2006–07	Premier League	0	0	0	0	0	0	—		—		0	0
Middlesbrough	2007–08	Premier League	0	0	0	0	0	0	—		—		0	0
Middlesbrough	2008–09	Premier League	6	0	3	0	1	0	—		—		10	0
Middlesbrough	2009–10	Championship	1	0	0	0	0	0	—		—		1	0
Middlesbrough	2010–11	Championship	0	0	0	0	1	0	—		—		1	0
Middlesbrough	Total		8	0	3	0	2	0	—		—		13	0
AFC Bournemouth (loan)	2006–07	League One	6	0	0	0	0	0	—		—		6	0
Aberdeen (loan)	2007–08	Scottish Premier League	8	0	2	0	1	0	2 (Note: Appearances in UEFA Cup)	1	—		13	1
Northampton Town (loan)	2009–10	League Two	1	0	0	0	0	0	—		—		1	0
Rotherham United (loan)	2009–10	League Two	15	3	0	0	0	0	—		—		15	3
Watford	2010–11	Championship	5	0	0	0	0	0	—		—		5	0
Watford	2011–12	Championship	1	0	0	0	1	0	—		—		2	0
Watford	Total		36	3	2	0	2	0	2		—		42	4
Stevenage (loan)	2010–11	League Two	1	0	1	1	0	0	—		—		2	1
Northampton (loan)	2010–11	League Two	19	0	0	0	0	0	—		—		19	0
Stevenage (loan)	2011–12	League One	5	1	0	0	0	0	—		1 (Note: Appearance in Football League Trophy)	0	6	1
Scunthorpe United (loan)	2011–12	League One	18	3	0	0	0	0	—		0	0	18	3
Scunthorpe United	2012–13	League One	23	0	1	0	2	0	—		—		26	0
Scunthorpe United	Total		66	4	2	1	2	0	—		1		71	5
Gateshead	2013–14	Conference	30	5	1	0	0	0	—		3 (Note: Appearances in FA Trophy and promotion play-offs)	1	34	6
Bengaluru FC	2014–15	I-League	17	2	5	0	0	0	6 (Note: Appearance in AFC Champions League and AFC Cup)	1	—		28	3
Bengaluru FC	2015–16	I-League	0	0	0	0	0	0	—		—		0	0
Bengaluru FC	Total		47	7	6	0	0	0	6	1	—		62	9
Edinburgh City	2016–17	Scottish League Two	16	3	0	0	0	0	—		0	0	16	3
Edinburgh City	2017–18	Scottish League Two	27	2	1	0	4	0	—		1 (Note: Appearance in Scottish Challenge Cup)	0	33	2
Edinburgh City	2018–19	Scottish League Two	0	0	0	0	0	0	—		1	0	1	0
Edinburgh City	Total		43	5	1	0	4	0	—		2	0	50	5
Career total			200	19	14	1	10	0	6	2	8	1	238	23

== Honours ==
Bengaluru FC

- Federation Cup : 2014–15
