= Lewis Hardman =

English footballer (born 1989)

Personal information
- Full name: Lewis Terence Hardman
- Date of birth: 25 March 1989 (age 37)
- Place of birth: Middlesbrough, England
- Height: 5 ft 8 in (1.73 m)
- Positions: Midfielder; right back

Youth career
- Darlington

Senior career*
Years	Team	Apps	(Gls)
2006–2009	Darlington	1	(0)
2007	→ Whitby Town (loan)	6	(0)
2007	→ Shildon (loan)		
2008	→ Sunderland Nissan (loan)		
2008	→ Bishop Auckland (loan)		
2009	Bishop Auckland (Note: Figures include matches played while on loan from Darlington as well as those in the permanent spell.)	12	(2)
- Whitby Town
- * Club domestic league appearances and goals

Lewis Terence Hardman (born 25 March 1989) is an English former professional footballer who played in the Football League for Darlington. A midfielder or right back, he also played non-league football for clubs including Whitby Town, Shildon, Sunderland Nissan and Bishop Auckland.

== Life and career ==
Hardman was born in 1989 in Middlesbrough. He represented his county schools association at under-16 level, before joining Darlington's youth system. In March 2007, with the team suffering numerous injuries, he was included in the travelling party for the League Two visit to Barnet, but did not make the matchday 16. He made his Football League debut in the final match of Darlington's 2006–07 season at home to Stockport County, which was goalless until Evan Horwood was sent off after 34 minutes. Hardman replaced Rory Prendergast for the last few minutes of a 5–0 defeat.

He was given a squad number for 2007–08 and, to gain experience of first-team football, began the season on loan to Whitby Town of the Northern Premier League Premier Division. Playing at right back, he made six appearances (four starts) during his month at the club, all of which were in league competition. He also spent time with Northern League Division One club Shildon, before returning to Darlington, where his performances both while on loan and for the reserves earned him occasional places on the first-team bench as well as the club's Young Player of the Year award.

Despite budget cuts, Hardman was given a one-year deal for 2008–09. He again spent the early part of the season out on loan in the Northern League, first with Sunderland Nissan, and then Bishop Auckland, where he was not allowed to play in the FA Cup because Darlington did not want him cup-tied.

He made no further appearances for Darlington's first team before he was released in January 2009 and joined Bishop Auckland on a permanent contract. Counting both spells, he finished the season with twelve appearances and two goals in the Northern League and two appearances in cup competitions. He played for Whitby Town again in 2010.
