= Ross Turnbull =

English footballer and coach

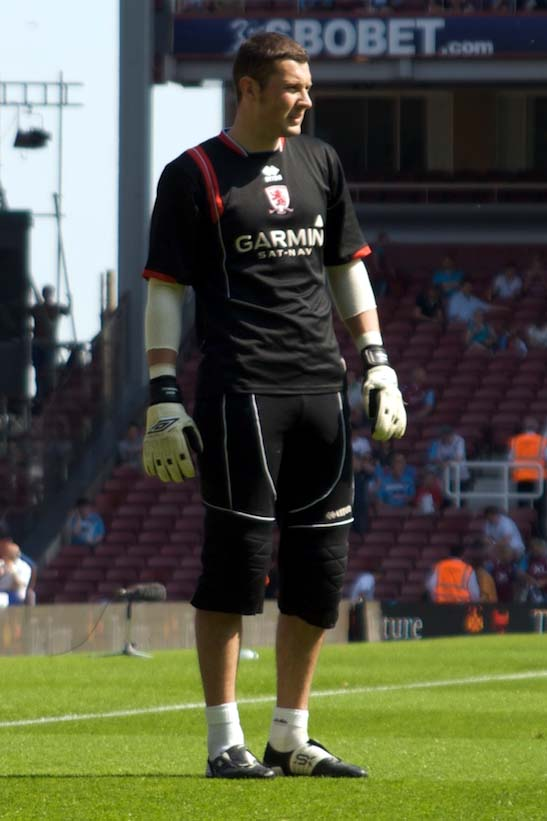
- Turnbull with Middlesbrough in 2009

Personal information
- Full name: Ross Turnbull
- Date of birth: 4 January 1985 (age 41)
- Place of birth: Bishop Auckland, England
- Height: 1.93 m (6 ft 4 in)
- Position: Goalkeeper

Youth career
- –2002: Middlesbrough

Senior career*
Years	Team	Apps	(Gls)
2002–2009	Middlesbrough	27	(0)
2003	→ Darlington (loan)	1	(0)
2004	→ Barnsley (loan)	3	(0)
2004	→ Bradford City (loan)	2	(0)
2004–2005	→ Barnsley (loan)	23	(0)
2005–2006	→ Crewe Alexandra (loan)	29	(0)
2007	→ Cardiff City (loan)	6	(0)
2009–2013	Chelsea	7	(0)
2013–2014	Doncaster Rovers	28	(0)
2014–2015	Barnsley	22	(0)
2015–2017	Leeds United	0	(0)
Total		148	(0)

International career
2000	England U16	1	(0)
2001–2002	England U17	4	(0)
2002–2003	England U18	5	(0)
2003–2004	England U19	8	(0)
- * Club domestic league appearances and goals

Ross Turnbull (born 4 January 1985) is an English former professional footballer who played as a goalkeeper. Between 2002 and 2015 he made 148 league appearances, mostly for Middlesbrough, Chelsea, Crewe Alexandra, Doncaster Rovers and Barnsley. He also played for England at youth level up to the under-19s.

== Early life ==
Turnbull attended Byerley Park Primary School and Woodham Community Technology College. He played as a midfielder for his hometown team Newton Aycliffe Youth Centre AFC but was turned into a goalkeeper by coach Arthur Vickerstaff. He had trials with North-East sides Darlington and Sunderland but instead joined Middlesbrough's Academy.

== Career ==
=== Middlesbrough ===
After coming through the club's youth ranks, Turnbull signed a professional contract with Middlesbrough in 2002. He represented England U20 in the 2003 FIFA World Youth Championship.

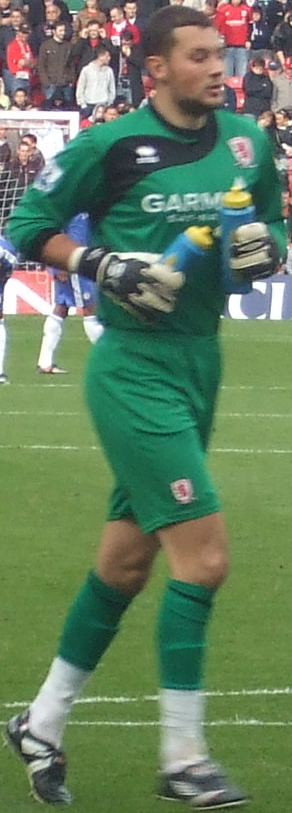
Turnbull playing for Middlesbrough in 2008

In July 2007, Turnbull signed a season-long loan deal at Football League Championship side Cardiff City. He was signed as a replacement for long-serving Neil Alexander, who left the club after a contract dispute, and began the season as first choice goalkeeper for the club. However, due to some errors in his opening games he was replaced for the 2–2 draw with Preston North End by Michael Oakes and spent the remainder of his loan spell on the bench before he was recalled by Middlesbrough on 5 October 2007 following an injury to second choice keeper Brad Jones. The recall was made by mutual consent between the teams. After being recalled, Turnbull played in two of Middlesbrough's games in the absence of first choice goalkeeper Mark Schwarzer who had broken his thumb in training. One was the win over Arsenal at the Riverside Stadium on 9 December 2007, the score being 2–1.

After more than 11 years with Middlesbrough, Mark Schwarzer left the club during the summer of 2008 to join Fulham. Middlesbrough manager Gareth Southgate decided not to buy a new goalkeeper and allow Turnbull and Jones to fight it out for the number one position. Although Jones played the first game of the season, Turnbull was in goal for Middlesbrough's 2–1 defeat at Liverpool the following week, when Jones injured himself in the warm-up. In June 2009 Turnbull rejected a contract offer from Middlesbrough, and informed the club that he would leave when it expired at the end of the month.

=== Chelsea ===
On 2 July 2009, Turnbull joined Chelsea on a free transfer, signing a four-year contract. Turnbull announced that he would not sit by as a permanent second place keeper to regular starting goalkeeper Petr Čech and that he would fight for his own first team place. His first involvement in the first team was after being named on the bench for Chelsea's first game of the 2009–10 season against Hull City at Stamford Bridge, which finished 2–1 in favour of Chelsea. Turnbull had a Chelsea reserves debut to forget when he made a series of blunders as the team lost 4–0 to Aston Villa.

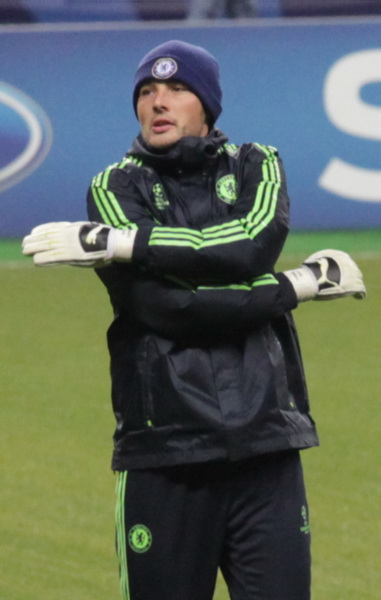
Turnbull warming up for Chelsea in 2010

He made his first team debut against Bolton Wanderers in the League Cup, coming on for the injured Henrique Hilário after 23 minutes, a game which Chelsea won 4–0. He made his first start in the UEFA Champions League 2–2 draw against APOEL. He made his Premier League debut against West Ham United in a 4–1 win as Petr Čech and Henrique Hilario respectively were both injured. The following Tuesday, he started for Chelsea against Inter Milan at Stamford Bridge, in which he conceded a goal with Inter winning 1–0 but otherwise had a decent performance. He made another Premier League appearance against Blackburn Rovers in a 1–1 draw on 21 March 2010.

He was not part of the matchday squad who defeated Portsmouth in the 2010 FA Cup final, but still received a winner's medal. He did not play enough games that season to earn a Premier League medal.

Turnbull made his first appearance of the 2010–11 season when he played in the League Cup third round against Newcastle United as Chelsea went on to lose 4–3. On 23 November 2010, Turnbull made another appearance in the Champions League Matchday 5 group stage against Slovak side MŠK Žilina as Chelsea won 2–1 when they came from a goal down to beat them. For the most part of the season, Turnbull remained second choice keeper behind Čech.

In the 2011–12 season, Turnbull began to get some more playing time. His first appearance of the 2011–12 season came he played in the League Cup third round against Fulham. The game finished 0–0 after extra time, and Chelsea subsequently beat Fulham 4–3 on penalties to go through to the next round. During normal time, Turnbull saved a penalty from Pajtim Kasami after Alex gave away the penalty (which resulted in a red card for Alex). In the penalty shootout, Turnbull saved two penalties from Mousa Dembélé and Bryan Ruiz. His next appearance in the League Cup was in the last 16 match against Everton. With 58 minutes gone, he conceded a penalty and received a red card. Čech took his place after coming on for Romelu Lukaku and saved the penalty from Leighton Baines. Chelsea went on to beat Everton 2–1 and go through to the next round. A quarter-final appearance followed, and was to be his, and Chelsea's, last in the League Cup as they lost 2–0 to Liverpool. During the match, Turnbull saved a penalty from Andy Carroll. With the 2011–12 Premier League season almost over, Turnbull played the final two league games against Liverpool (lost 4–1) and Blackburn (won 2–1) as Čech was rested prior to the Champions League final, in which Turnbull picked up a medal as an unused substitute. The game against Liverpool was his first league match in two years. His poor clearance led directly to a goal from Jonjo Shelvey.

Turnbull was released by Chelsea on 30 June 2013, ending four years association with the club. After being released by Chelsea, Turnbull was on trial with Dutch side RKC Waalwijk after being featured for RKC on 20 July 2013, in a pre-season match defeat to Rot-Weiß Oberhausen in Germany.

=== Doncaster Rovers ===
On 31 July 2013, Ross signed for newly promoted Championship side Doncaster Rovers on a one-year deal. Turnbull made his debut for the club in the opening game of the season, where he conceded three goals, in a 3–1 loss against Blackpool. The third goal followed him going to the Blackpool penalty area for a corner in the last minute, unusual for a league match so early in the season. Turnbull went on to make a string of impressive performances for Doncaster in 2013, which included saving a penalty in a South Yorkshire derby against Barnsley which finished 0–0 on 9 November. At the beginning of February 2015 it was reported that Turnbull was suffering from injuries in both of his calves and a specialist had recommended a three to four week rest period.

Turnbull made his comeback from injury in a reserve game against Scunthorpe United on 18 March 2015 in a 4–0 victory and was named on the bench for Rovers' game against local rivals Sheffield Wednesday on 22 March 2015. Unfortunately due to the impressive performances of the on-loan goalkeeper Sam Johnstone who was brought in as goalkeeper cover, Turnbull did not feature again for Doncaster towards the end of the 2013–14 season. In May 2014 Turnbull was one of eight players to be offered an extension to his contract.

=== Barnsley ===
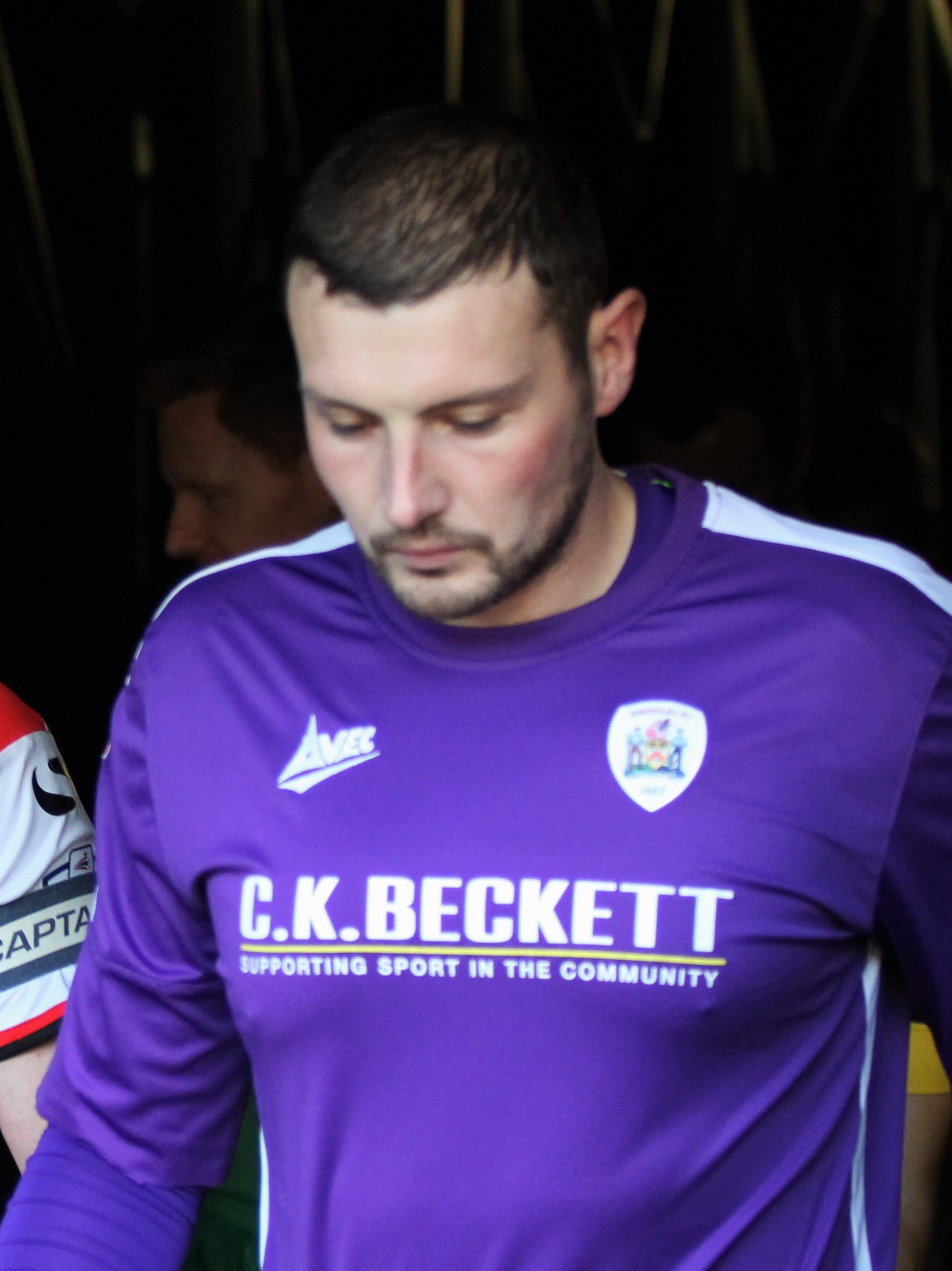
Turnbull with Barnsley in January 2015

On 23 July 2014, Turnbull turned down the opportunity to extend his contract at Doncaster to sign a two-year contract with League One side Barnsley, moving to Oakwell for his third spell. After a spell out injured, Turnbull finally made his debut on 20 September 2014 away to Port Vale. Turnbull was sent off in the game against Leyton Orient on 20 December 2014 for handling outside the penalty area, however Barnsley held out to win 2–0. Turnbull conceded 5 goals against struggling Crawley Town on 14 February 2015, a game which equaled Barnsley's seventh straight away defeat in the league.

Turnbull missed the remainder of the 2014–15 season due to a back injury which he underwent successful surgery in March 2015 to correct. In May 2015, Barnsley manager Lee Johnson revealed that he was relishing the prospect of the battle between goalkeepers Turnbull, Christian Dibble and Adam Davies, in the upcoming 2015–16 season, declaring that the best goalkeeper will be the club's number 1. On 6 July 2015, Turnbull was linked with a move to local rivals Leeds United.

=== Leeds United ===
Turnbull signed a two-year contract with Leeds United on 15 July 2015. Turnbull said he was going to challenge Marco Silvestri for the number 1 shirt. On 31 July 2015, Turnbull was given the number 22 shirt for the upcoming 2015–16 season. On 12 August 2015, Turnbull made his Leeds debut against his former club Doncaster Rovers in the League Cup, with Leeds losing 4–2 on penalties after a 1–1 draw. On 14 October 2015, Turnbull's season was ended after it was revealed that he had broken his ankle in training.

By 24 September 2016, Turnbull had fallen so far out of favour that he, along with Toumani Diagouraga and Luke Murphy, were no longer listed in the Leeds United match programme as a member of the squad, and all three were training with the under-23 team. On 17 May 2017, it was announced that Turnbull had been released with Leeds not extending his contract.

== Coaching career ==
After leaving as a player, Turnbull took up a position with Leeds to become their opposition keeper analyst. He left a year later, in 2017, to take up a similar role with Chelsea.

In March 2018, Turnbull joined the coaching staff at Hartlepool United initially as a voluntary goalkeeper coach. Following the appointment of Matthew Bates as first-team manager in May 2018, Turnbull's position became a full-time paid role. At the end of the 2020–21 season, following the club's promotion, Turnbull left the club to take up a scouting role with his former club Chelsea.

== Personal life ==
Turnbull attended Woodham Community Technology College in Newton Aycliffe. He has a daughter, Maisy, born in 2008, and a son, Josh born in 2011

== Career statistics ==
Appearances and goals by club, season and competition
Club	Season	League			FA Cup		League Cup		Europe		Other		Total	
Club	Season	Division	Apps	Goals	Apps	Goals	Apps	Goals	Apps	Goals	Apps	Goals	Apps	Goals
Darlington (loan)	2003–04	Third Division	1	0	0	0	0	0	—		—		1	0
Barnsley (loan)	2003–04	Second Division	3	0	0	0	0	0	—		—		3	0
Bradford City (loan)	2004–05	League One	2	0	0	0	0	0	—		—		2	0
Barnsley (loan)	2004–05	League One	23	0	1	0	0	0	—		—		24	0
Crewe Alexandra (loan)	2005–06	Championship	29	0	0	0	0	0	—		—		29	0
Middlesbrough	2005–06	Premier League	2	0	0	0	0	0	0	0	—		2	0
Middlesbrough	2006–07	Premier League	0	0	0	0	1	0	—		—		1	0
Middlesbrough	2007–08	Premier League	3	0	0	0	0	0	—		—		3	0
Middlesbrough	2008–09	Premier League	22	0	0	0	1	0	—		—		23	0
Middlesbrough	Total		27	0	0	0	2	0	—		—		29	0
Cardiff City (loan)	2007–08	Championship	6	0	0	0	2	0	0	0	—		8	0
Chelsea	2009–10	Premier League	2	0	0	0	1	0	2	0	0	0	5	0
Chelsea	2010–11	Premier League	0	0	0	0	1	0	1	0	0	0	2	0
Chelsea	2011–12	Premier League	2	0	0	0	3	0	0	0	—		5	0
Chelsea	2012–13	Premier League	3	0	2	0	2	0	0	0	0	0	7	0
Chelsea	Total		7	0	2	0	7	0	3	0	0	0	19	0
Doncaster Rovers	2013–14	Championship	28	0	1	0	2	0	—		—		31	0
Barnsley	2014–15	League One	22	0	4	0	0	0	—		1	0	27	0
Leeds United	2015–16	Championship	0	0	0	0	1	0	—		—		1	0
Leeds United	2016–17	Championship	0	0	0	0	0	0	—		—		0	0
Leeds United	Total		0	0	0	0	1	0	—		—		1	0
Career total			148	0	8	0	14	0	3	0	1	0	174	0

== Honours ==
Chelsea

- FA Cup: 2009–10, 2011–12
- UEFA Champions League: 2011–12
- UEFA Europa League: 2012–13

Individual

- Middlesbrough Young Player of the Year: 2007–08
