= Matthew Bates =

English footballer (born 1986)

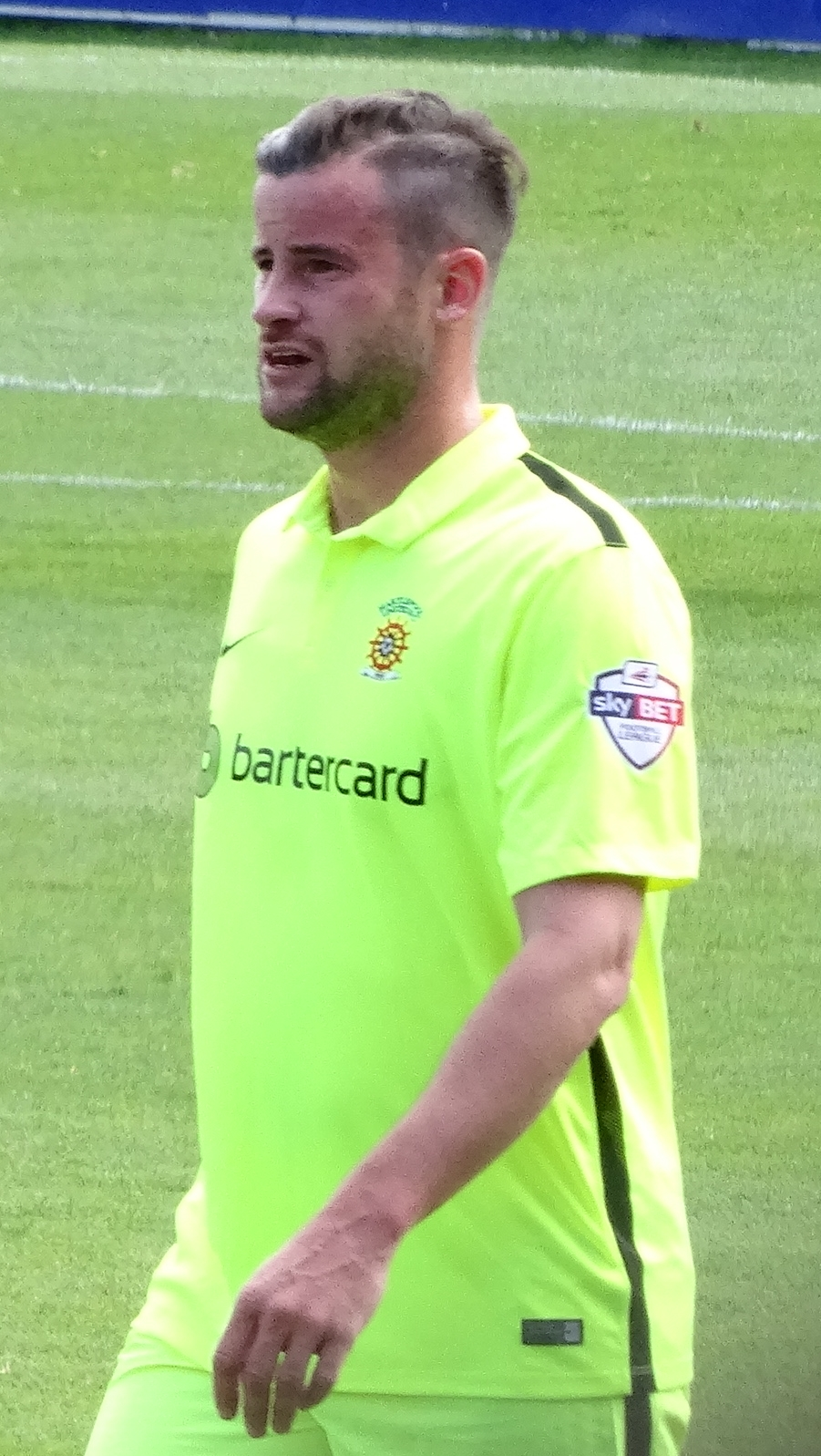
- Bates playing for Hartlepool United in 2015

Personal information
- Full name: Matthew David Bates
- Date of birth: 10 December 1986 (age 39)
- Place of birth: Stockton-on-Tees, England
- Height: 5 ft 10 in (1.78 m)
- Position: Defender

Youth career
- –2004: Middlesbrough

Senior career*
Years	Team	Apps	(Gls)
2004–2012	Middlesbrough	104	(6)
2005	→ Darlington (loan)	4	(0)
2006	→ Ipswich Town (loan)	2	(0)
2008	→ Norwich City (loan)	3	(0)
2012–2013	Bristol City	13	(0)
2013–2014	Bradford City	22	(0)
2014–2018	Hartlepool United	77	(2)
Total		225	(8)

Managerial career
- 2017: Hartlepool United (caretaker)
- 2018: Hartlepool United
- * Club domestic league appearances and goals as of 15:24, 17 June 2017 (UTC)

Matthew David Bates (born 10 December 1986) is an English football coach and former professional footballer, as well as holding a UEFA B coaching licence.

Born in Stockton-on-Tees, he began his youth career with Manchester United before moving to local side Middlesbrough. After winning the FA Youth Cup, Bates had a successful loan spell with Darlington. He became regularly involved in Middlesbrough's first team in 2005–06, and was a member of the Boro squad that finished as runners-up in the UEFA Cup. Bates had further loan spells with Ipswich Town and Norwich City before being named as Middlesbrough's new captain in 2010. He left the club in 2012 and joined Bristol City on a short-term deal. Bates was released at the end of the 2012–13 season and joined Bradford City. After one season with Bradford, he signed for League Two Hartlepool United. Bates spent three seasons with Hartlepool before moving into coaching.

He was caretaker manager for Hartlepool in both the 2016–17 and 2017–18 seasons. On the latter occasion, Bates impressed enough to earn the permanent role as head coach. After keeping Hartlepool in the National League, he was sacked in November 2018. Between 2022 and 2024, Bates was the assistant manager at Whitby Town.

== Club career ==
=== Middlesbrough ===
Born in Stockton-on-Tees, County Durham, Bates began playing at Manchester United's centre of excellence in Birtley since the age of nine. Several years later, the centre was closed down and he was taken in by his hometown club Middlesbrough. After tasting FA Youth Cup success in 2003–04, he was promoted to the first team and made his debut on 6 December 2004, coming on as an injury time replacement for Jimmy Floyd Hasselbaink in a 3–2 win over Manchester City. After a successful loan spell at Darlington, he made a breakthrough, making 28 appearances and played alongside former manager Gareth Southgate in central defence. He was an unused substitute for Middlesbrough in the 2006 UEFA Cup final defeat to Sevilla.

Bates had been tipped by some to be Southgate's successor but an injury while on loan at Ipswich in November 2006 prematurely ended his 2006–07 season. He was seriously injured in his second game, tearing his cruciate ligament and partially tearing his medial collateral ligament, and returned to Boro. After recovering in January 2008, Bates moved on loan to Norwich City for two months. He later returned to Middlesbrough after suffering from another knee injury which has resulted in him needing an operation for the third time in just 18 months. He scored his first league goal for Middlesbrough in a crucial 3–1 win over relegation rivals Hull on 11 April 2009.

Following Middlesbrough's relegation from the Premier League in the 2008–09 season, rumours arose regarding his future with them. However, despite a number of Premier League clubs being interested, he opted to stay at Middlesbrough, signing a new three-year deal at the Riverside outfit.

On 25 July, Bates suffered the fourth serious knee injury of his career and could be sidelined for the rest of the year. He went for surgery in September and is confirmed to be out for the entire season.

The 2010–11 season saw Bates as a regular in the Boro line-up. He got his first goal of the season against Portsmouth in a 2–2 draw. Under new Boro manager Tony Mowbray Bates was named new captain. He scored the only goal in a 1–1 draw with Preston North End. His third and final goal of the season came when he returned to the side after injury, playing in midfield, against Sheffield United. He was rewarded with a great start to the 2011–12 season by winning Player of the Month. On 27 March 2012, Bates suffered a fifth serious knee injury which ruled him out for a period of 6 months.

=== Bristol City ===
In November 2012, Bates signed for Championship side Bristol City on a short-term deal until January 2013. He made his debut on 17 November in a 1–1 draw away to Blackpool, conceding a penalty in the 90th minute for handball, which Tom Ince converted. On 8 May 2013, Bates was released by City.

=== Bradford City ===
On 13 October 2013, Bates signed a 3-month deal with Bradford City. On 15 January 2014, Bates signed a new deal with Bradford City until the end of the season.

=== Hartlepool United ===
Bates joined Hartlepool United in June 2014. Bates' playing stint with Hartlepool was ravaged by injuries with the defender making 77 league appearances in four years with the club.

== International career ==
Bates was capped by England at youth level.

== Coaching career ==
On 24 April 2017, following the dismissal of Dave Jones, Bates was appointed caretaker manager of Hartlepool United for the final two matches of the 2016–17 season. Hartlepool won 2–1 in dramatic fashion on the final day of the season against Doncaster Rovers but this result was not enough, as a late Newport County goal saw Hartlepool relegated from the Football League for the first time in their history. When Craig Harrison was appointed as Hartlepool's first-team manager in May 2017, Bates moved into a coaching role with the club's U21s side.

On 21 February 2018, Bates took charge of Hartlepool again following the dismissal of Craig Harrison. Bates lost his first two games in charge as caretaker manager but managed to turn around the club's poor form and a crucial three-game win streak against Barrow, Bromley and Maidstone United led to him winning the Manager of the Month award for March 2018.

After keeping Hartlepool in the division, Bates was appointed as permanent first-team manager in May 2018. After six successive league defeats, Bates was sacked as Hartlepool manager in November 2018 with the club in 13th position.

In September 2022, it was announced that Bates had joined Northern Premier League side Whitby Town as their assistant manager. Bates left Whitby in May 2024 to take up a scouting role at another club.

== Personal life ==
Matthew has a son with Chanelle Hayes.

== Career statistics ==
Appearances and goals by club, season and competition
Club	Season	League			FA Cup		League Cup		Other		Total	
Club	Season	Division	Apps	Goals	Apps	Goals	Apps	Goals	Apps	Goals	Apps	Goals
Middlesbrough	2003–04	Premier League	0	0	0	0	0	0	—		0	0
Middlesbrough	2004–05	Premier League	2	0	0	0	0	0	0	0	2	0
Middlesbrough	2005–06	Premier League	16	0	4	0	3	0	5 (Note: Appearances in UEFA Cup)	0	28	0
Middlesbrough	2006–07	Premier League	1	0	0	0	1	0	—		2	0
Middlesbrough	2007–08	Premier League	0	0	0	0	0	0	—		0	0
Middlesbrough	2008–09	Premier League	17	1	3	0	0	0	—		20	1
Middlesbrough	2009–10	Championship	0	0	0	0	0	0	—		0	0
Middlesbrough	2010–11	Championship	31	3	1	0	0	0	—		32	3
Middlesbrough	2011–12	Championship	37	2	3	0	2	0	—		42	2
Middlesbrough	Total		104	6	11	0	6	0	5	0	126	6
Darlington (loan)	2004–05	League Two	4	0	—		—		—		4	0
Ipswich Town (loan)	2006–07	Championship	2	0	—		—		—		2	0
Norwich City (loan)	2007–08	Championship	3	0	—		—		—		3	0
Bristol City	2012–13	Championship	13	0	0	0	0	0	—		13	0
Bradford City	2013–14	League One	22	0	1	0	—		—		23	0
Hartlepool United	2014–15	League Two	25	1	1	0	1	0	0	0	27	1
Hartlepool United	2015–16	League Two	32	0	3	0	0	0	0	0	35	0
Hartlepool United	2016–17	League Two	20	1	2	0	1	0	1 (Note: Appearance in EFL Trophy)	0	24	1
Hartlepool United	Total		77	2	6	0	2	0	1	0	86	2
Career total			225	8	18	0	8	0	6	0	257	8

== Managerial statistics ==
As of 27 November 2018

Managerial record by team and tenure
Team	From	To	Record					Ref
Team	From	To	P	W	D	L	Win %	Ref
Hartlepool United (caretaker)	24 April 2017	26 May 2017	2	1	0	1	50.0	
Hartlepool United	21 February 2018	28 November 2018	38	13	12	13	34.2	
Total			40	14	12	14	35.0	

== Honours ==
=== As a player ===
Middlesbrough

- FA Youth Cup: 2003–04
- UEFA Cup runner-up: 2005–06

=== As a manager ===
Individual

- National League Manager of the Month: March 2018
