= Steve Gibson (businessman) =

British entrepreneur and the chairman (born 1958)

Steve Gibson OBE
- Born: 9 January 1958 (age 68); Middlesbrough, England
- Occupation: Entrepreneur
- Known for: Owner of Middlesbrough FC

27th Chairman of Middlesbrough
- In office 1994–present
- Preceded by: Colin Henderson

Stephen Gibson (born 9 January 1958) is a British entrepreneur and the chairman and owner of Middlesbrough FC. In May 2024, he was 350th on the Sunday Times Rich List, with a net worth of £640 million. He is the second richest person from North East England.

Gibson was born in Middlesbrough and raised in the Park End area of the town. Raised Catholic, he attended local schools, St Pius X Primary and St Mary's College. In 1979, he became Middlesbrough's youngest ever Labour councillor, being elected to represent Park End at age 21. He is the uncle of Stoke City defender Ben Gibson.

== Bulkhaul Limited ==
In 1981, he founded Bulkhaul Limited, a company dedicated to the global transportation of bulk liquids, powders and gases. He set up the company by borrowing £1,000 from his father. The company operates from a UK base with Bulkhaul centres and offices worldwide. The company covers the principal global routes in European, Atlantic and Pacific regions, using a sophisticated computerised system to track and monitor its tank units in transit around the world and its own fleet of vehicles, both in the UK, and increasingly in Europe. Bulkhaul ceased manufacturing at Teesside in 2002, but retained its main base of operations in Middlesbrough.

Gibson is the majority owner of the Gibson O'Neill Company Ltd, the holding company for Bulkhaul with a 75% stake. Michael David O'Neill holds the remaining 25%. For the year ending 30 June 2024, Gibson O'Neill had a turnover of £234.6 million, with an operating profit of £27.1 million. The Gibson O'Neill group includes Bulkhaul, Middlesbrough FC and Rockliffe Hall Hotel.

== Relationship with Middlesbrough ==
=== Taking control ===
Gibson is a lifelong Middlesbrough fan, having attended matches with Chris Kamara at Ayresome Park as a youngster. He joined the board as the club's youngest ever director at the age of 26 while Willie Maddren was manager. He helped save the club from liquidation by forming a consortium in 1986. In 1993, he bought Scottish & Newcastle's shares in the club, and succeeded Colin Henderson as the club's chairman in 1994, owning roughly 90% of the club.

=== Chairman ===
Gibson saw the club leave Ayresome Park in 1995 for the Riverside Stadium, a brand new all-seater stadium worth £54 million. He also made money available for the purchase of big-name players. Gibson's appointment of Bryan Robson as manager in May 1994 helped raise the profile of the club and achieve three Wembley cup final appearances within 12 months during 1997 and 1998. As a result of ongoing investment in supporting Robson's successor, Steve McClaren, in 2004 the club was able to win its first trophy in 128 years, the English League Cup. His tenure as chairman has also seen the club reach the UEFA Cup final, Europe's second biggest club cup competition. Gibson has since stated that his aim for the club is to see it play more regular European football. In 2004, Gibson was given the Freedom of Middlesbrough after the club won the English League Cup.

Gibson was appointed Officer of the Order of the British Empire (OBE) in the 2016 Birthday Honours for services to the economy, sport and the community on Teesside.

== Politics ==
Before becoming involved with Middlesbrough, Gibson was the local Labour Party's youngest ever councillor. He has occasionally raised his profile when commenting on the local political situation. He did so when working with Middlesbrough's elected mayor Ray Mallon in 2009 in the fight to save Teesside's steel industry. They accused the Government and local Labour MP's of "betrayal", with Gibson saying: "We have got five Labour seats here. If the steelworkers lose their jobs, we are going to work our socks off to make sure the five MPs lose their jobs. It is an absolute betrayal."

In October 2015, Gibson launched a scathing attack on Stockton South Conservative MP James Wharton over the collapse of the Redcar steelworks, saying that he would "bury him" if he did not improve. Gibson later made peace with Wharton and they jointly visited a local school to give a newspaper interview and explain the reconciliation. In March 2017, Gibson said that he would support the election of Labour's Sue Jeffrey in the forthcoming Tees Valley mayoral election. In May 2017, Gibson sent out a message of support to thousands of local residents for James Wharton's re-election campaign in the form of a letter.
