= Nathan Porritt =

English footballer

Personal information
- Full name: Nathan John Porritt
- Date of birth: 9 January 1990 (age 36)
- Place of birth: Middlesbrough, England
- Position: Midfielder

Youth career
- 2000–2008: Middlesbrough

Senior career*
Years	Team	Apps	(Gls)
2008–2010	Middlesbrough	0	(0)
2009	→ Darlington (loan)	5	(0)
2010–2011	Olympic Charleroi	4	(0)
2011–2013	Stokesley		
2013–2015	Billingham Synthonia	68	(22)

International career
2007–2008	England U17	8	(2)
- * Club domestic league appearances and goals

Nathan John Porritt (born 9 January 1990) is an English former footballer. He started his career with his hometown club Middlesbrough where he attracted interest from Chelsea despite never featuring for the first-team.

== Early life ==
Porritt was born in Middlesbrough, North Yorkshire. At the age of ten, he joined Middlesbrough F.C.'s youth academy while continuing his education at The King's Academy.

== Club career ==
Secret filming for BBC Panorama's programme "Undercover: Football's Dirty Secrets", aired in September 2006, exposed an agent acting without Middlesbrough's permission in offering the then 15-year-old Porritt to club representatives, including Chelsea's youth director Frank Arnesen, in contravention of the Football Association's rules.

Porritt signed a two-year scholarship with Middlesbrough in the summer of 2006, and signed his first professional contract with the club on 10 June 2008. Loaned to Darlington of League Two, he made his senior debut as a starter on 18 August 2009, in a 1–0 home loss to Crewe Alexandra. He played five league games and one more in the Football League Trophy, before being dropped for the last game of his one-month loan. Porritt's contract with Middlesbrough was cancelled by mutual consent on 1 February 2010.

Porritt was reported to have trained with Portuguese clubs Belenenses, and Olhanense but did not sign for them. After a frustrating six-month spell at financially troubled Belgian Third Division club Olympic Charleroi Porritt was released from his contract with the club. Porritt has since had trials with West Ham United, Blackpool and Hartlepool. On 23 February 2013 he signed for Billingham Synthonia.

From 2017 until 2020, he was the kitman at Hartlepool United.

== International career ==
Considered a bright prospect, he was a member of the England under-17 squad at the 2007 FIFA U-17 World Cup. He was called up to the England under-18 squad in 2008. He had also played a number of games for the U16 team, previous to this.
