= Padman =

Padman or Pad Man may refer to:

- Arunachalam Muruganantham (born 1962), Indian social entrepreneur, inventor of low-cost sanitary pads
- Pad Man (film), 2018 biographical comedy-drama made in India, based on Arunachalam Muruganantham
- Doug Padman (1885–1970), Australian politician
- Rachael Padman (born 1954), Australian physics lecturer at the University of Cambridge in England
- General Jonathan Krantz, nickname Pad Man, main antagonist in the television series Prison Break

== See also ==
- World of Padman (WoP), a video game
