= Kate Blackwell =

Kate Blackwell may refer to:

- Kate Blackwell (barrister) (born 1969), British barrister
- Kate Blackwell (cricketer) (born 1983), Australian cricketer
