= Loreto Grammar School =

Loreto Grammar School (Catholic grammar school)
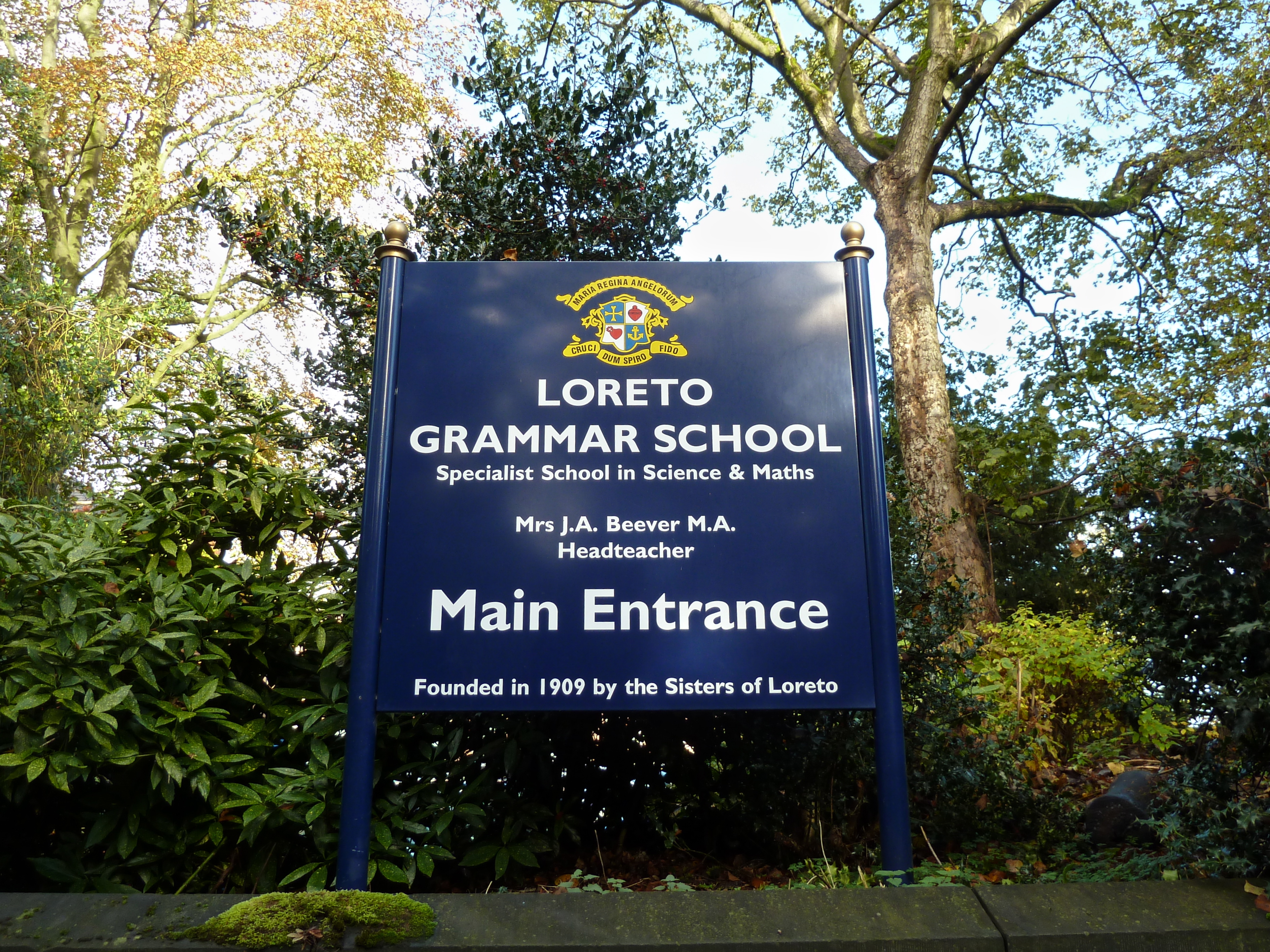

Location
- Dunham Road; Altrincham, Greater Manchester, WA14 4AH; England; 53°23′18″N 2°21′26″W

Information
- Type: Grammar school; Academy
- Motto: "Women in time to come will do much"
- Religious affiliation: Roman Catholic
- Established: 1909
- Department for Education URN: 138464 Tables
- Ofsted: Reports
- Headteacher: Jane Beever
- Gender: Girls
- Age: 11 to 18
- Enrolment: 1053
- Colours: Navy, Burgundy, Cream and White
- Website: http://www.loretogrammar.co.uk/

Loreto Grammar School is located in Trafford, England. Pupils must sit an entrance exam to enter, and fulfil several other entry criteria. It is part of the worldwide Loreto community, and the Altrincham school was founded by the Sisters of Loreto in 1909. It has also assumed the status of an academy (30 August 2012) and is a specialist school for maths and science.

The school's values are justice, truth, sincerity, freedom, joy, and more recently excellence and internationality.

At the school there are 1050 students and 100 staff members. Loreto is also part of a bigger, worldwide community which was founded by Mary Ward and this consists of over 120 schools and 70,000 students.

The 266 students of the school's sixth form are expected to support the ethos and values of the school and show the ability to follow an academic AS/A2 level course or the International Baccalaureate course.

The school was described in its 2005 Ofsted report as "outstanding with an outstanding sixth form". In its next report in 2008 Ofsted remarked "This is an outstandingly effective school. It has improved substantially since the last inspection and has demonstrated excellent capacity to develop further".

== History ==
=== Independent school ===
The school was called Loreto Convent Grammar School, Bowdon, in the 1950s; the school was not a direct grant grammar school, but an independent catholic school, not a state school. Girls would attend from as far away as Warrington and Alderley Edge in the 1950s. It was a Cheshire school, playing netball against teams such as Northwich County Grammar School for Girls.

Sport was emphasised, and competitions would take place against Wirral schools, then likewise in Cheshire. A similar type of school today would be Alderley Edge School for Girls, a catholic girls school, or the former Culcheth Hall School.

New buildings were built in the early 1970s, costing around £250,000. The school included a prep school section. In the late 1970s Stockport council sent catholic assisted places to the school. The school was called Loreto Convent Grammar School in the early 1990s. Local councils bought catholic places at the school.

=== State school ===
In around 1997 the school became a grant-maintained state school.

== Notable former pupils ==
- Kate Blackwell, KC at English criminal law, Lead Counsel to many statutory inquiries, Head of Chambers at Lincoln House Chambers
- Suzanne Charlton, former BBC weather presenter, daughter of Bobby Charlton
- Jade Clarke, England netball captain 2020, also plays for Surrey Storm netball club
- Antonia Quirke, film critic, TV and radio presenter
- Anna Scaife, professor of radio astronomy at the University of Manchester, winner of the 2018 Jackson-Gwilt Medal
- Nina Warhurst, BBC Breakfast presenter

== See also ==
- Loreto Convent High School, a catholic direct grant grammar school until the late 1970s, became Loreto College, Manchester, a sixth form college
