= Rachael Padman =

Australian physicist (born 1954)

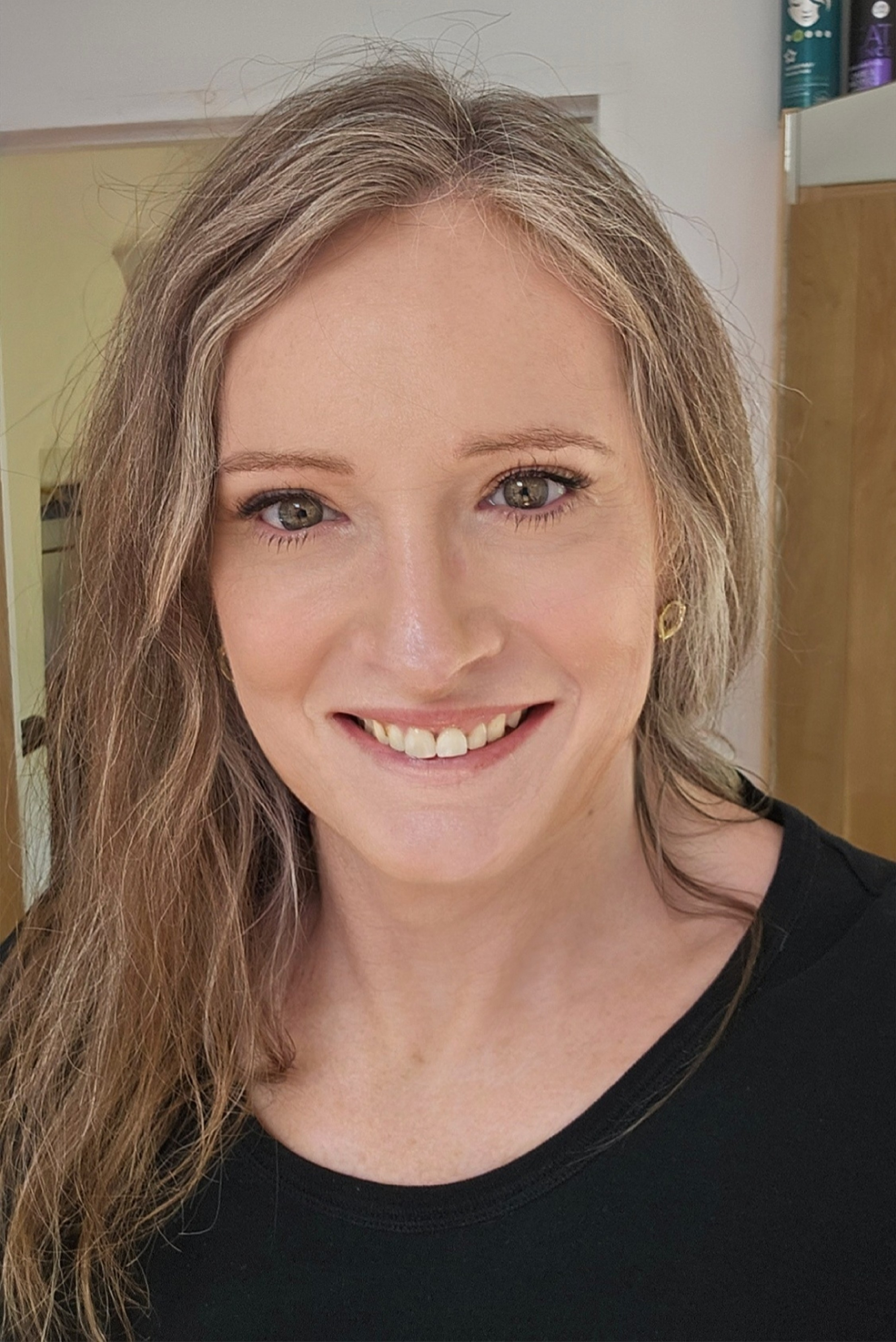
- Padman in 2025
- Born: 1954 (age 71–72); Brisbane, Australia
- Education: Monash University; St John's College, Cambridge
- Scientific career
- Fields: Astrophysics and radio astronomy
- Workplaces: CSIRO; University of California, Berkeley; Newnham College, Cambridge
- Doctoral advisor: Richard Hills

Rachael Padman (born 1954) is an Australian physics lecturer at the University of Cambridge in England. From Melbourne, Padman was a graduate in electrical engineering from Monash University, Australia, and specialised in radio astronomy. After her doctoral research, she has made contributions to research in stellar evolution (the formation of stars). She is now mainly involved in administrative works in teaching. Padman is a member of the International Astronomical Union.

A trans woman, Padman underwent gender-affirming surgery in 1982 when she was undertaking a PhD in astronomy at the University of Cambridge. In 1996, she was elected a Fellow of Newnham College, one of three all-women colleges in the University of Cambridge at the time. She received opposition from some people, who argued, unsuccessfully, that Padman should not be made a Fellow as she was assigned male at birth.

== Early life and education ==
Padman was born in Brisbane, in 1954, and attended Gladstone High School in South Australia and then Melbourne High School. She was the school cadet captain and won the rifle-shooting prize for two consecutive years. She obtained a first degree in electrical engineering from Monash University in Australia. She joined research work on radio astronomy at the Commonwealth Scientific and Industrial Research Organisation Division of Radio Physics in Sydney, for two years.

In her autobiographical essay, "Rachael's Story", she discussed her lifelong gender identity as female, and one motive behind going to England was a hope for an opportunity to address her gender issues. In 1977, Padman settled in England to work for Doctor of Philosophy (PhD) in astronomy at an all-male St John's College, Cambridge, and did research at the University of Cambridge's Cavendish Laboratory. Among the first things she did on arrival in Cambridge was to approach John Randall at Charing Cross Hospital in London, who prescribed oestrogen. In 1978, she came out as transgender, and started with her PhD supervisor, Richard Hills. She said Rachael spontaneously came up as her name one morning; she initially thought about using Susan from a pupil from her primary school, before renouncing because there were already two Susans in her laboratory, including the secretary.

In 1981, she began living as a woman in her everyday life, and she had gender-affirming surgery in October 1982.

She received her degree in 1982 for a doctoral thesis titled "Short-wavelength observations of interstellar molecules".

== Career ==
Following her PhD, Padman moved to the US where she was a Miller Research Fellow at the University of California, Berkeley. She returned to Cambridge in 1984. At the Cavendish Laboratory, she was appointed Deputy Project Scientist for the James Clerk Maxwell Telescope in Hawaii in 1984. She led teams working on the development of the early instruments and wrote much of the early data acquisition and spectral line analysis software. She worked there for four years until she became a University Lecturer in the Department of Physics, University of Cambridge, in 1998. Since 2005, she has been primarily involved in the administration of teaching in the Department of Physics. She served on the University Council from 2009-2016 and was the Director of Education in School of Physical Sciences from 2008-2014. At Newnham, she is both teaching physics and serves as Director of Studies in Natural Sciences. Her research interests include millimetre wave optics and receiver systems, low-mass star formation, in particular jets and outflows from young stars, and spectral-line data reduction software.

She was publicly outed in the press in 1996, when Padman was elected Fellow of Newnham College. The college statutes allowed only female members in the institute. The Principal, Dr. Onora O'Neill, knew that Padman had undergone a gender-affirming surgery. Feminist Germaine Greer, who was a member of the college's governing body, strongly opposed the appointment, saying that Padman was a man and male. Fellows, students, and staff of Cambridge University supported Padman, and she was admitted without further opposition. Clare Longrigg published an article titled "A Sister with No Fellow Feeling" in the 25 June 1997 issue of The Guardian making charges on Padman and containing remarks attributed to Greer. The article was retracted on 19 March 1998 as information was found to be false, and the accusation made against Greer was considered groundless.

Padman was awarded the inaugural Gay Times Barbara Burford Award for excellence in STEM in 2017.

== Selected Research Publications ==
- R.Padman, S.J.Bence, J.S.Richer. (1997). ‘Observational properties of molecular outflows’;. Invited review in Herbig-Haro flows and the birth of low-mass stars, ed B.Reipurth and C.Bertout. Proc. IAU Symposium 182, Chamonix, France, 20-24 January 1997. pp 123-140.
- R.Padman (1995). ‘Optical fundamentals for array feeds’. Invited review in Multifeed Systems for Radio Telescopes, D.T. Emerson and J.M. Payne (Eds). ASPConf. Series., 1.
- G.J.White, R.Padman (1992). ‘First images of atomic carbon in the interstellar medium’ Nature, Vol 354, p511 doi: 10.1038/354511a0
- N.D.Parker, R.Padman, P.F.Scott. (1991). ‘Outflows in dark clouds: their role in protostellar evolution’. MNRAS, Vol 252, p442 doi: 10.1093/mnras/252.3.442
- R.Padman, D.A.Green, A.N.Lasenby. (1990). ‘Jets in our Galaxy’ Chap.10 of the book Beams and Jets in Astrophysics, in the CUP Monographs on Physics series, P. Hughes (Ed) doi: 10.1017/CBO9780511564703.011
- R.Padman, J.A.Murphy, R.E.Hills. (1987).’Gaussian mode analysis of Cassegrain antenna efficiency’ IEEE Trans. Ant. Prop’n., AP35, p1093 doi: 10.1109/TAP.1987.1143983
