= Adam Johnson (footballer) =

English association football player (born 1987)

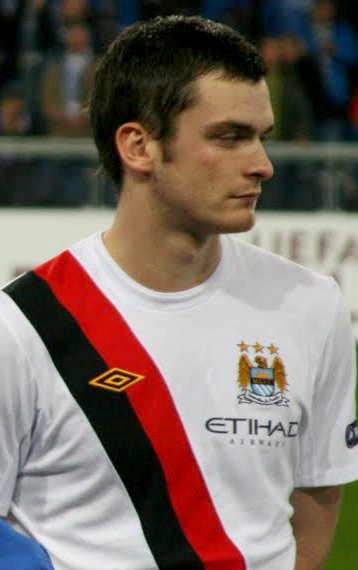
- Johnson lining up for Manchester City in 2010
- Born: Adam Johnson; 14 July 1987 (age 39); Sunderland, England
- Height: 5 ft 9 in (1.75 m)
- Children: 2
- Status: Released on licence on 22 March 2019
- Criminal charges: Child grooming; Sexual activity with a minor
- Penalty: Six years in prison
Association football career
- Position: Winger
Youth career
- 1995–1997: Newcastle United
- 1999–2004: Middlesbrough
Senior career*
Years	Team	Apps	(Gls)
2004–2010	Middlesbrough	96	(13)
2006	→ Leeds United (loan)	5	(0)
2007	→ Watford (loan)	12	(5)
2010–2012	Manchester City	73	(11)
2012–2016	Sunderland	122	(19)
Total		308	(48)
International career^{‡}
2005–2006	England U19	8	(0)
2007–2009	England U21	19	(3)
2010–2012	England	12	(2)
Medal record
Men's football
Representing England
UEFA European Under-21 Championship
Runner-up	2009 Sweden
- * Club domestic league appearances and goals as of 22:58, 19 April 2016 (UTC) ‡ National team caps and goals as of 22:58, 19 April 2016 (UTC)

Adam Johnson (born 14 July 1987) is an English former professional footballer who played as a winger. A product of the Middlesbrough youth academy, he came to prominence after making his debut aged 17 in a UEFA Cup match. He made 120 appearances for Middlesbrough, also spending time on loan at Leeds United and Watford.

In February 2010, Johnson moved to Manchester City, where he won the FA Cup in 2011 and the Premier League the following season. He was signed by his hometown club Sunderland for £10 million in 2012. Johnson played at various levels for England, earning 12 caps at senior level.

In March 2015, Johnson was arrested and charged over sexual activity with a 15-year-old girl; the age of consent in the United Kingdom is 16. Johnson continued to play for Sunderland during his bail. The following February, he pleaded guilty to two charges against him, the other being one of child grooming, and was subsequently sacked by Sunderland. In March 2016, Johnson was found guilty of sexual activity with a child and sentenced to six years in prison. He was released in 2019 after serving half his sentence.

== Early life ==
Johnson was born in Sunderland, Tyne and Wear, and brought up in Easington, County Durham, in North East England. He played for Cleveland Juniors Football Club and attended Easington Community Science College. Upon seeing Johnson score two goals at a Wembley Stadium seven-a-side school match, Johnny Haynes told Johnson he was "a great little player" with "a lovely left foot".

== Club career ==
=== Middlesbrough ===
==== Early career ====
At the age of 12, Johnson was taken in by Middlesbrough's youth academy, having previously attended Newcastle United's Centre of Excellence between 1995 and 1997. He and his Boro teammates David Wheater, Tony McMahon and Andrew Taylor were part of the squad that won the 2003–04 FA Youth Cup.

He made his senior début aged 17 on 17 March 2005 in the UEFA Cup in the 1–0 defeat away to Sporting CP which saw the club eliminated 4–2 on aggregate in the last 16, replacing Doriva for the last 11 minutes. Almost six months later, on 10 September, he made his Premier League debut, and first senior start, deputising for the injured fellow academy product Stewart Downing in a 2–1 home win against Arsenal. For much of the first half of the 2005–06 season, he was on the bench as an unused substitute, mainly in the UEFA Cup matches. He made his second start in the competition against Litex Lovech on 15 December and set up Massimo Maccarone's first goal in a 2–0 win. For the rest of the season, he remained in the team's matchday squads, albeit as Downing's deputy or an unused substitute.

Johnson's first goal for Middlesbrough came in a midweek Premier League match away to Bolton Wanderers on 3 May 2006, opening the scoring in a 1–1 draw with "a mazy run from the left flank before curling in a deflected shot". He was playing due to Middlesbrough's involvement in the 2006 UEFA Cup Final, which was to be played a week later as Steve McClaren rested most of the first team squad. On 30 June 2006, he signed a new four-year contract extension.

==== Loans to Leeds United and Watford ====
On 16 October 2006, he joined Leeds United on a month-long loan after being signed by Leeds' caretaker manager John Carver, but with Leeds struggling in the Championship, it was hard for Johnson to impress despite getting the man of the match award on his debut. After playing four matches during his month-long loan spell, Johnson returned to Middlesbrough as Leeds chose not to extend his loan. Later on in the season, he came on as a substitute in the FA Cup replay with Bristol City and played a vital role in seeing Middlesbrough through to the next round by setting up one goal and scoring the winning penalty in the shootout.

In September 2007, Johnson joined Championship club Watford on a three-month loan. He played 12 matches for the club, scoring five times, before being recalled to Middlesbrough earlier than stipulated in the deal following some brilliant performances. Coincidentally, Watford's form dipped after his departure.

==== Return to Middlesbrough ====
In the final match of the season, he scored an 18-yard (16-metre) strike from a loose ball just minutes after coming on as a substitute in Boro's 8–1 victory over Manchester City. In the 2008–09 season, he managed to make 32 appearances, half of those as substitutes as Downing was first choice. He managed to start most of the fixtures near the end of the season when Downing was ruled out with a long-term injury.

Johnson became an important part of Boro's Championship team for the 2009–10 season following Downing's transfer to Aston Villa, scoring three of Boro's five goals in the first three matches. He led the Boro scoring charts, with eight goals, for the entire first half of the season despite being a winger, which led to new manager Gordon Strachan expressing his concern about overrelying on Johnson for goals. In the 18 August match at Scunthorpe United, he missed a penalty awarded for a foul on Rhys Williams and scored another after being tripped by the Scunthorpe goalkeeper in the penalty box when both went for the rebound.

After a bright start to the season, the highly rated youngster became a subject of transfer rumours, but the Boro management insisted that he would not be sold. He chose not to extend his contract, however, which was to end after the 2009–10 season. On 13 December, he was substituted for Marvin Emnes after picking up a hamstring injury in the 1–0 home loss to Cardiff City but returned to score a penalty against Scunthorpe in a 3–0 win, thus taking his goal tally into double figures. He scored a brace for the third time in the season when he turned in a man of the match performance against Doncaster Rovers on 26 January to end Boro's winless away streak stretching back to October.

In recognition of his consistent performances, Johnson was voted for the North East Football Writers' Young Player of the Year award, joining a string of Boro players to do so.

=== Manchester City ===
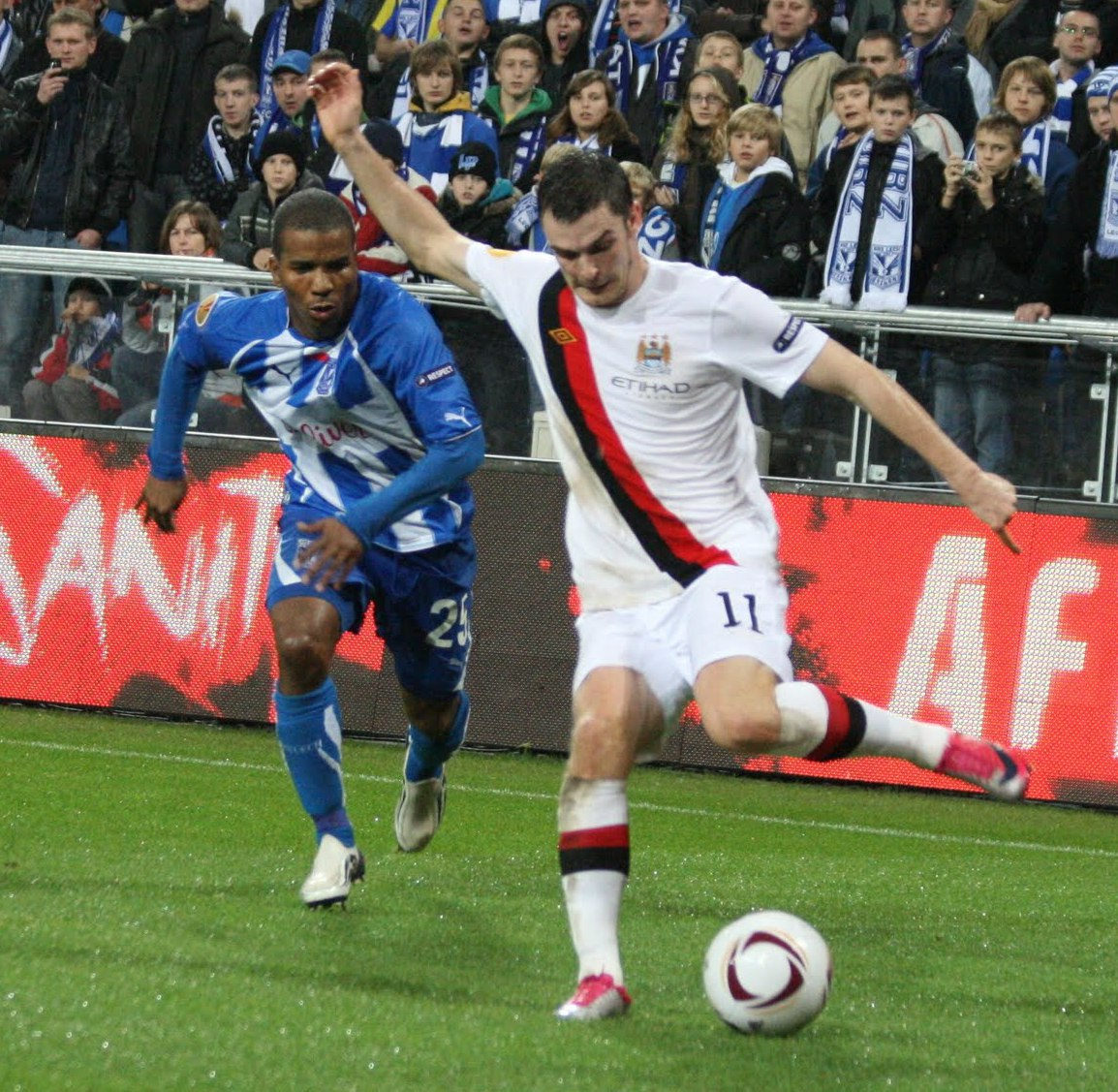
Johnson (right) playing for Manchester City in 2010

When the winter transfer window opened, Johnson was again the subject of transfer speculation and Middlesbrough reportedly received a bid from Manchester City. Interest from Manchester City was heightened after Adam Johnson played City weeks earlier in an FA Cup third round. Although Johnson had to go off injured in the first half, he was arguably the best player on the pitch during his 30-minute spell. On 1 February 2010, City signed him for an undisclosed fee, rumoured to be in the region of £7 million, on a four-and-a-half-year contract.

Johnson made his first appearance for the club on 6 February, coming on as substitute for Stephen Ireland against Hull City. Three days later, he made his first start against Bolton Wanderers on the right side of a three-man attack alongside Carlos Tevez and Emmanuel Adebayor, finishing as the man of the match. Johnson scored his first goal against Sunderland; he curled a left footed effort into the top corner one and a half minutes into injury time to secure a last-gasp 1–1 draw. His performance, which earned the man of the match award, led England manager Fabio Capello to publicly praise him and consider him for selection.

On New Year's Day, he scored the winner in the 1–0 win against Blackpool, dedicating his goal to Dale Roberts, his friend and Rushden & Diamonds goalkeeper who committed suicide on 14 December 2010. He ended the season with his first senior trophy of his career, the 2011 FA Cup, coming on as a substitute in the final.

After scoring in two 3–0 wins against Inter Milan and League of Ireland XI in the pre-season Dublin Super Cup, he started in Manchester City's first Premier League match of the season against Swansea City, getting an assist as his shot was saved by Michel Vorm and the rebound scored by Edin Džeko. City went on to win the match 4–0. He scored his first goal of the season during a 4–0 win against Blackburn Rovers at Ewood Park, curling a shot into the top corner to make the score 1–0 at the time. He followed it up with a goal in the next match against Aston Villa, with the match finishing 4–1 to City. On 26 October 2011, he scored and got an assist in a 5–2 League Cup win against Wolverhampton Wanderers at Molineux. Three days later, he again scored against Wolves, this time in a 3–1 home league win. In the next round, he assisted the only goal of the match, playing a through-ball for Sergio Agüero to score, in a 1–0 win away to Arsenal. He came on as a late sub in a 5–1 home win over Norwich City and scored his fifth goal of the season. His sixth goal of the season came in a 3–0 win against Stoke City on 21 December. On 14 April, he scored in a 6–1 win against Norwich at Carrow Road. He ended that season with 26 league appearances as Manchester City won the 2011–12 Premier League in dramatic circumstances on the last day of the season.

=== Sunderland ===
On 24 August 2012, his hometown team Sunderland signed Johnson on a four-year contract for £10 million. Sunderland manager Martin O'Neill said "Adding quality players to the squad has been our main aim this summer and Adam certainly fits that bill. He has terrific ability, great delivery and I'm sure he is a player who will excite the fans. I couldn't be more delighted to have him at the club." On 28 August, Johnson made his first appearance for Sunderland in a 2–0 win over League Two team Morecambe in the League Cup second round, assisting both goals at the Stadium of Light. He scored his first goal for the club on 10 November, opening the scoring in a 1–2 defeat away to Everton. He scored the only goal of a win over former club Manchester City at home on 26 December. In April 2013, against Sunderland's fierce rivals Newcastle at St James' Park, Johnson's picked up the ball on Sunderland's right and cut inside before sending a curling effort past Newcastle goalkeeper Rob Elliot with his left foot to score.

Johnson's first goal of the 2013–14 season came in the League Cup against Milton Keynes Dons after a run from his own half, as Sunderland scored four goals in 12 minutes to win 4–2. However, his form suffered as Sunderland struggled to one point from the first eight matches, a run that cost manager Paolo Di Canio his job. Johnson's next goal came in a 2–1 home defeat to Tottenham on 7 December.

After losing his place in the starting line up, the FA Cup third round match with Carlisle United marked a turning point in Johnson's fortunes as he scored a free kick and played a part in both other goals in Sunderland's 3–1 win. Two days later, Johnson was brought on as a substitute in the League Cup semi-final first leg against Manchester United, and won a penalty after being fouled by Tom Cleverley, which Fabio Borini scored to give Sunderland a 2–1 advantage going into the second leg. Manager Gus Poyet praised Johnson's contribution as 'outstanding'. On 11 January 2014, he scored his first career hat-trick and assisted Ki Sung-Yueng, inspiring Sunderland to a 4–1 away win against Fulham which lifted them off the bottom of the table. He was the Premier League Player of the Month for January 2014. On 2 March in the League Cup Final against Manchester City, he assisted Borini for the opening goal in the tenth minute, but Sunderland lost 1–3.

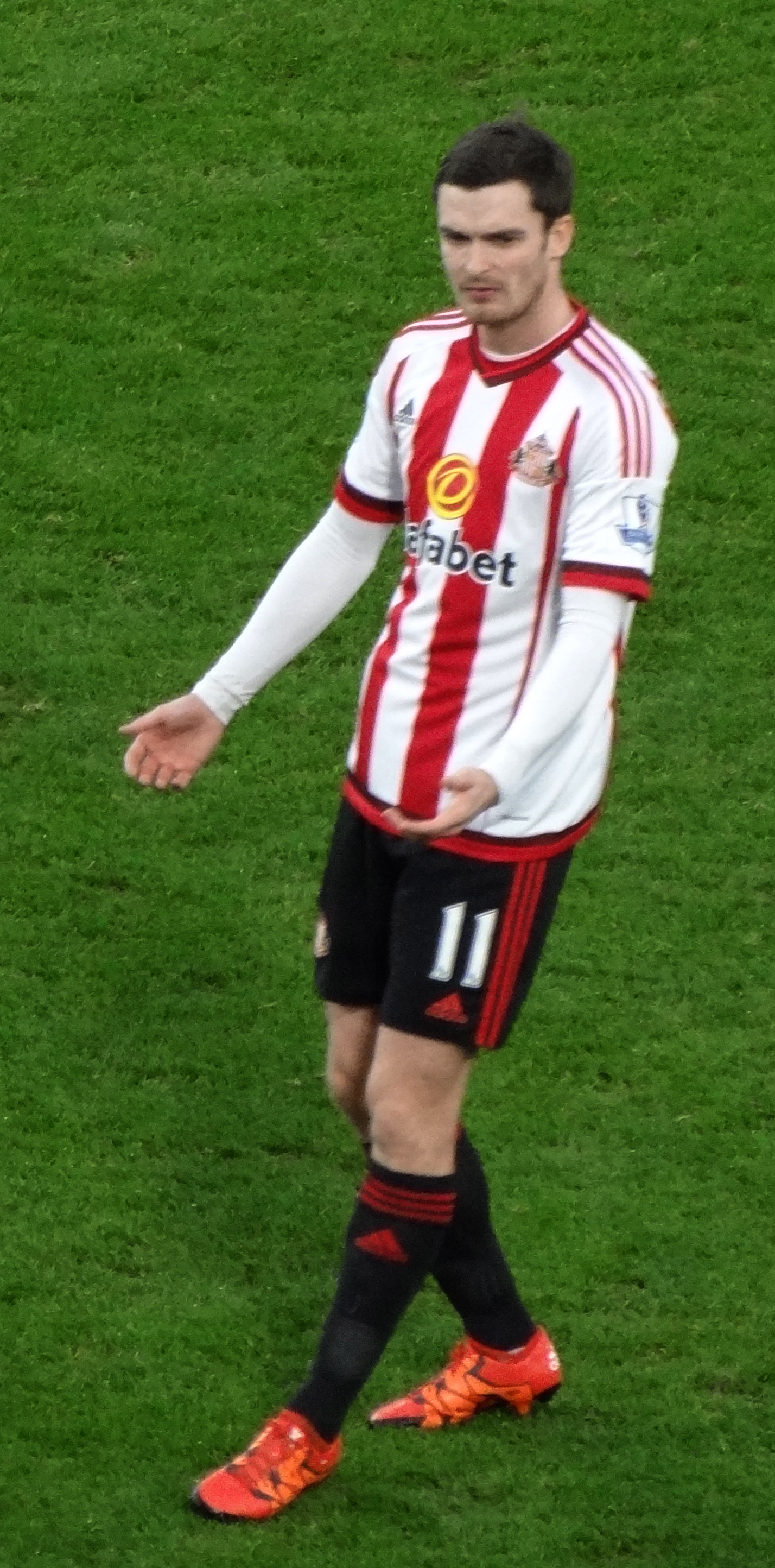
Johnson playing for Sunderland in 2015

His first goal of the 2014–15 season came on 27 August in the League Cup against Birmingham City, where he scored the second goal in a 3–0 win. His first league goal of the season came on 13 September, where he scored a solo effort in a 2–2 draw with Tottenham Hotspur at the Stadium of Light. On 21 December he scored a 90th-minute winning goal away to Newcastle, securing Sunderland's 4th consecutive win over their local rivals, and his third goal in three seasons against the club. Five days later, Johnson opened the scoring after just 30 seconds against Hull City, but was unable to help the team avoid defeat as they went on to lose 1–3. He scored his fifth goal of the season on New Years Day 2015, scoring from a penalty to make the score 2–2 against Manchester City, although Sunderland would go on to lose the match 3–2.

He was immediately suspended by Sunderland on 2 March 2015 after his arrest on suspicion of having sexual activity with a 15-year-old girl. His suspension lasted for 2 matches under manager Gus Poyet; following Poyet's sacking and the appointment of new manager Dick Advocaat on 17 March, Johnson returned to the club on 18 March and played in the next game on 21 March. Despite Johnson later being charged with three offences, Sunderland continued to select him while he initially pleaded not guilty to all charges. During Johnson's trial, he claimed that he admitted to Sunderland in May 2015 that he had kissed the girl and sent her sexually explicit messages.

Having played the first match of the new season, Johnson picked up an injury in August 2015, putting him out for two months. On 25 October, he scored a penalty in the Tyne–Wear derby, opening the scoring before half time in an eventual 3–0 win. Johnson played what would be his last match for Sunderland on 6 February 2016, the weekend before the start of his trial, scoring one of Sunderland's goals in a 2–2 draw with Liverpool. Five days later Johnson had his contract terminated after he pleaded guilty to sexual activity with a child under the age of 16 and grooming.

== International career ==
A former England under-19 international, Johnson was called up for the under-21 team at the 2009 UEFA U21 Championships in Sweden. He scored once in qualification and again in the first leg of the qualification play-offs against Wales U21s as the Young Lions narrowly won 5–4 on aggregate to qualify for the tournament. During the tournament, he started in two of the three group stage matches. He won the man of the match award in the final group stage match against Germany that ended in a 1–1 draw and converted his penalty in the semi-final shoot-out win against Sweden.

In late February 2010, Johnson was named in the senior squad for the first time in Fabio Capello's 30-man shortlist for the upcoming March friendly against Egypt in May, but did not make the final 23. Two months later, Capello named Johnson in his preliminary 30-man 2010 FIFA World Cup squad. Johnson made his England debut on 24 May in a FIFA World Cup warm-up match, a 3–1 friendly victory against Mexico at Wembley Stadium. Johnson came on as a late substitute for James Milner. The following week Capello announced his final 23-man squad, and Johnson failed to make the cut.

England's first match after the 2010 FIFA World Cup was against Hungary at Wembley Stadium. Johnson was named in the starting line-up for the first time, making his full England debut and playing the entire match. He scored his first international goal on 3 September 2010 against Bulgaria in a UEFA Euro 2012 qualifier, which England won 4–0. He scored his second international goal against Switzerland in a 3–1 win after coming on as an early substitute for the injured Theo Walcott. In all, he made five appearances in qualifying as England progressed to the finals of UEFA Euro 2012.

Fabio Capello resigned as England coach in February 2012, and Stuart Pearce took temporary charge. Johnson started Pearce's only match as England manager, a 2–3 defeat at the hands of the Netherlands. When Roy Hodgson took over in May 2012, Johnson was not selected in Hodgson's 23-man squad for UEFA Euro 2012, but was named on standby in case of injuries. He totalled 12 England caps and scored two international goals.

== Sexual crimes and conviction ==
In December 2014, Johnson began communicating over social media with a 15-year-old female fan while his partner was pregnant. The following 17 January, he met up with the girl in his Range Rover, where he signed two Sunderland shirts for her. Thirteen days later, they met again, and Johnson kissed the girl.

On 2 March 2015, Johnson was arrested by Durham Police on suspicion of having sexual activity with an underage girl, who was 15. On 23 April, he was charged with three offences of sexual activity with a child under 16 and one of child grooming, to which he pleaded not guilty in June. An initial trial date in Durham in September 2015 was later moved to February 2016 in Bradford Crown Court.

On 10 February 2016, at the start of his trial, Johnson pleaded guilty to "one count of sexual activity with a child and one count of grooming". He denied two further counts of underage sexual activity. The trial lasted for sixteen days, was presided over by Circuit Judge Jonathan Rose, the lead barrister for the prosecution was Kate Blackwell QC and the lead barrister for the defence was Orlando Pownall QC. On 2 March 2016, Johnson was found guilty on a majority verdict of 10–2 of one count of sexual activity with a child and found not guilty of a second count of the same crime. In a victim impact statement, the girl stated that she suffered abuse on social media during the time Johnson claimed innocence, that she had lost confidence and that her school work had suffered. A court psychiatrist for the defence found Johnson to be "socially and psychologically immature" and stated that there was no evidence that Johnson had a sexual attraction to prepubescent children.

Johnson was granted bail in order to say farewell to his infant daughter. On 24 March 2016, he was sentenced to six years in prison for grooming and sexual activity with a girl aged 15. The judge also ordered him to pay £50,000 of the prosecution's legal fees of £67,132. Pownall said before the sentencing that Johnson had been "stripped of his England caps" but the FA later confirmed that this was not the case and that they cannot take caps away from players. After his sentencing, Johnson was held at HM Prison Leeds. On 12 April, Johnson's legal team launched an appeal against his sentence. On 15 April, Johnson was moved to HM Prison Moorland near Doncaster. On 12 July, his appeal was refused, and a second appeal was refused on 16 March 2017.

In April 2017 video footage taken inside HMP Moorland appeared to show Johnson talking to fellow inmates about his conviction. In the footage, Johnson talks about his victim and the fact that he believes his sentence was lengthened due to his position as a professional footballer. Johnson also seemed to say that he wished he had forcibly raped his victim.

Johnson was released on 22 March 2019, after serving half of his sentence.

=== Reaction ===
Johnson was immediately suspended by Sunderland following his arrest, and missed two games before being returned to the team while on bail. He played in 28 games throughout the following 11 months, until he was first dropped from the team on 11 February 2016, and then later sacked by Sunderland, after pleading guilty at trial to two of the four counts put against him. His endorsement by Adidas was also terminated as a result, and EA Sports removed his likeness from the FIFA 16 video game.

After the conviction, Sunderland manager Sam Allardyce faced scrutiny for continuing to select Johnson during his bail, particularly following allegations that the club had seen documents in May 2015 suggesting that Johnson acknowledged his guilt. Allardyce, who had joined the club only in October 2015, claimed that he was not aware of such documents and had always been informed that Johnson was to plead not guilty; a Sunderland press release made the same statement.

In court, Johnson claimed that he had confessed to Sunderland chief executive Margaret Byrne on 4 May 2015. Byrne, a former lawyer, was due to appear as a witness for his defence but did not take the stand. Sunderland's supporter association desired to question her over her knowledge of the case. Byrne resigned on 8 March 2016, regretting her "serious mistake", but claimed that she had not made the club aware of Johnson's admission, nor was she aware that he was to plead guilty.

Pownall confirmed that Johnson intended to appeal against his conviction. Johnson's sister Faye urged supporters to change their Facebook profile pictures to one of Johnson and his daughter and a slogan proclaiming his innocence. She had set up an online group for supporters of his innocence, which reached 1,000 likes before being shut down after being reported by users including North East–based child protection vigilantes Dark Justice. The chief executive of the Professional Footballers' Association, Gordon Taylor, said that Johnson had "damaged the reputation of football" and that his chances of playing again were "very remote".

== Personal life ==
Johnson attended school, and the academies of Sunderland and Middlesbrough, with Dale Roberts, who went on to play as a goalkeeper. Roberts died by suicide on 14 December 2010, which Johnson subsequently described as "the worst day of my life".

Before his imprisonment, Johnson lived in Castle Eden, County Durham. He has a daughter, born in January 2015, with his former partner Stacey Flounders. In February 2016, while giving evidence at his trial, Flounders announced that she and Johnson had separated, claiming that he had confessed to infidelity with other women. During his imprisonment in 2017 he sold his home, Tollgate Lodge, for £1.7 million. It was purchased by Durham and England cricketer Ben Stokes. Upon his release from prison he returned to live in Castle Eden, in a seven-bedroom home he had built during his imprisonment. He and Stacey Flounders later reconciled, and had a second child, a son, who was born in July 2021.

== Career statistics ==
=== Club ===
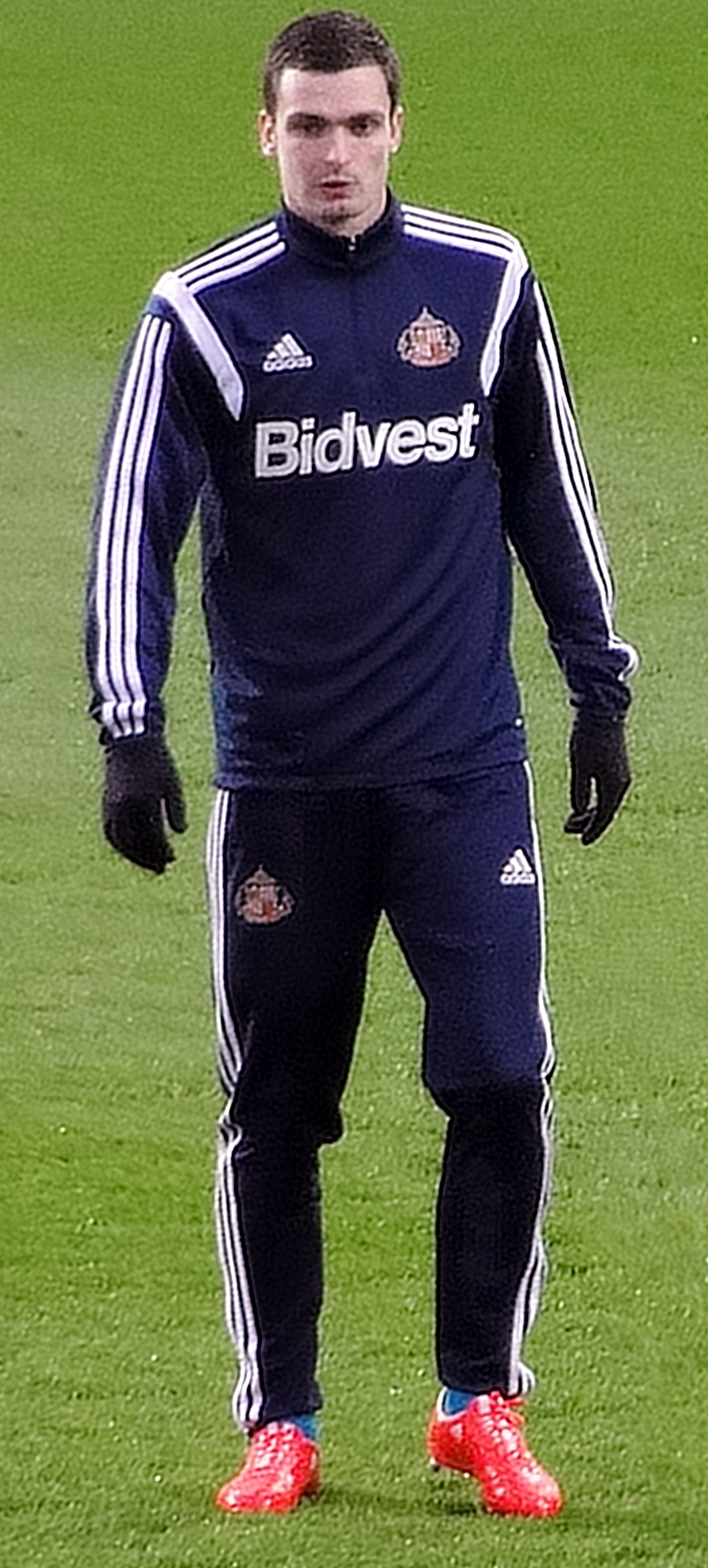
Johnson warming up for Sunderland in 2015

As of match played 6 February 2016

Appearances and goals by club, season and competition
Club	Season	League			FA Cup		League Cup		Other		Total	
Club	Season	Division	Apps	Goals	Apps	Goals	Apps	Goals	Apps	Goals	Apps	Goals
Middlesbrough	2004–05	Premier League	0	0	0	0	0	0	1 (Note: Appearance(s) in UEFA Cup)	0	1	0
Middlesbrough	2005–06	Premier League	13	1	1	0	1	0	3	0	18	1
Middlesbrough	2006–07	Premier League	12	0	3	0	1	0	—		16	0
Middlesbrough	2007–08	Premier League	19	1	4	0	1	0	—		24	1
Middlesbrough	2008–09	Premier League	26	0	5	0	2	2	—		33	2
Middlesbrough	2009–10	Championship	26	11	1	0	1	1	—		28	12
Middlesbrough	Total		96	13	14	0	6	3	4	0	120	16
Leeds United (loan)	2006–07	Championship	5	0	—		—		—		5	0
Watford (loan)	2007–08	Championship	12	5	—		—		—		12	5
Manchester City	2009–10	Premier League	16	1	—		—		—		16	1
Manchester City	2010–11	Premier League	31	4	4	1	1	0	7 (Note: Appearances in UEFA Europa League)	2	43	7
Manchester City	2011–12	Premier League	26	6	1	0	4	1	7 (Note: One appearance in FA Community Shield, five in UEFA Champions League, one in UEFA Europa League)	0	38	7
Manchester City	2012–13	Premier League	0	0	—		—		0	0	0	0
Manchester City	Total		73	11	5	1	5	1	14	2	97	15
Sunderland	2012–13	Premier League	35	5	2	0	3	0	—		40	5
Sunderland	2013–14	Premier League	36	8	2	1	7	1	—		45	10
Sunderland	2014–15	Premier League	32	4	2	0	2	1	—		36	5
Sunderland	2015–16	Premier League	19	2	0	0	1	0	—		20	2
Sunderland	Total		122	19	6	1	13	2	—		141	22
Career total			308	48	25	2	24	6	18	2	375	58

=== International ===
As of match played 15 August 2012

Appearances and goals by national team and year
National team	Year	Apps	Goals
England	2010	6	2
England	2011	3	0
England	2012	3	0
Total		12	2

As of match played 15 August 2012
Scores and results list England's goal tally first, score column indicates score after each Johnson goal.

List of international goals scored by Adam Johnson
No.	Date	Venue	Cap	Opponent	Score	Result	Competition	Ref
1	3 September 2010	Wembley Stadium, London, England	3	Bulgaria	3–0	4–0	UEFA Euro 2012 qualification	
2	7 September 2010	St. Jakob-Park, Basel, Switzerland	4	Switzerland	2–0	3–1	UEFA Euro 2012 qualification	

== Honours ==
Manchester City

- Premier League: 2011–12
- FA Cup: 2010–11
- FA Community Shield: 2012

Sunderland

- Football League Cup runner-up: 2013–14

Individual

- Premier League Player of the Month: January 2014
