= 2011–12 Manchester City F.C. season =

English football club season

Manchester City
2011–12 season
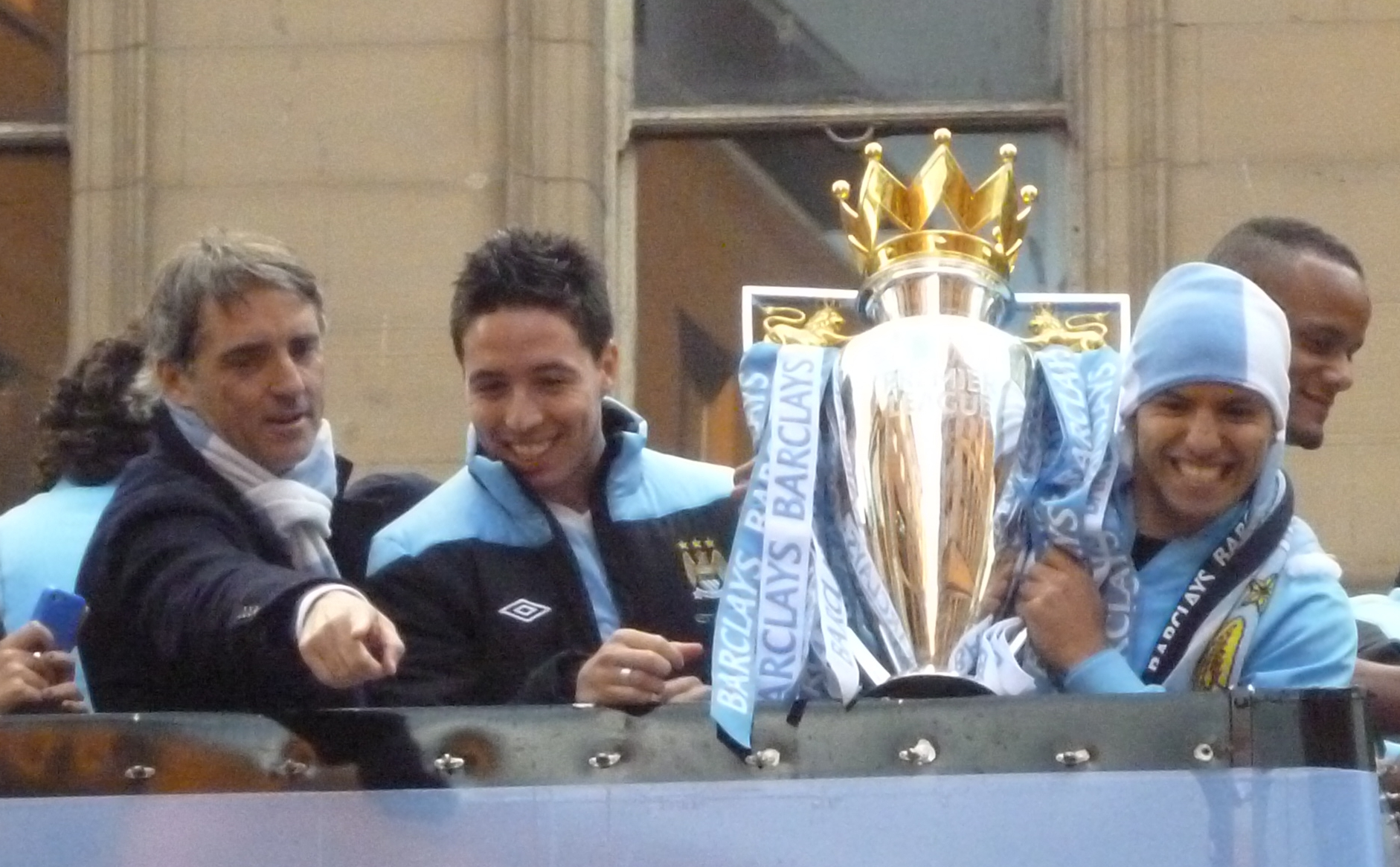
- From left to right: Roberto Mancini, Samir Nasri, Sergio Agüero and Vincent Kompany with the Premier League trophy
- Owner: Abu Dhabi United Group
- Chairman: Khaldoon Al Mubarak
- Manager: Roberto Mancini
- Stadium: Etihad Stadium
- Premier League: 1st
- FA Cup: Third round
- League Cup: Semi-finals
- FA Community Shield: Runners-up
- UEFA Champions League: Group stage
- UEFA Europa League: Round of 16
- Top goalscorer: League: Sergio Agüero (23); All: Sergio Agüero (30)
- Highest home attendance: 47,435 v. Queens Park Rangers (13 May 2012, Premier League)
- Lowest home attendance: 25,070 v. Birmingham City (21 September 2011, League Cup)
- Average home league attendance: 47,044
Home colours	Away colours	Third colours

The 2011–12 season was Manchester City Football Club's 110th season of competitive football, 83rd season in the top flight of English football and 15th season in the Premier League. After finishing third in the league the previous season, the Blues qualified for the UEFA Champions League for only the second time in their history, and the first since 1968–69 when the tournament was known as the European Cup.

The season was filled with ups and downs, but in the end it would be forever remembered as the one that brought Manchester City the long-awaited league title after a 44-year wait. City's third English top tier title was clinched on the final day of the season, after the Blues defeated Queens Park Rangers 3–2, coming back from being down 1–2 with two stoppage-time goals just before the final whistle. The championship marked City's first English title since 1968, as well as the first time the Premier League has been won by a club whose current spell in the top division began after the league commenced play. It was also the first and currently only Premier League title to be decided on goal difference, with City's title-clinching goal against QPR coming 15 seconds after the final whistle blew in city rivals Manchester United's 1–0 win at Sunderland, which would otherwise have brought the title to the side of Sir Alex Ferguson.

== Kit ==
Supplier: Umbro / Sponsor: Etihad Airways

Home	Home alt.	Away	Third	Goalkeeper 1	Goalkeeper 1 alt.	Goalkeeper 2	Goalkeeper 2 alt.	Goalkeeper 3

=== Kit information ===
Umbro supplied kits for Manchester City for the third season in a row.

- Home: The home kit for the 2011–12 season featured a striking "soundwave" graphic embedded on to the front of the shirt. The "soundwave" graphic took inspiration from the club's anthem, the Blue Moon, which was sung by fans on the match days. The shirt was combined with sky blue shorts for the first time since the 2006–07 season and with hooped socks.
- Away: The away strip saw a return to the red-and-black stripes, the traditional Manchester City away colours that were famously introduced by the club's former co-manager Malcolm Allison in the 1960s. The most notable element of the strip was the position of the stripes on the arms, which was designed so that if a player scored and held his arms out horizontally whilst celebrating, the stripes would match up with the stripes on the body. The kit was embellished with gold applications and completed with black shorts and socks.
- Third: Manchester City's navy away strip from the previous season was retained as a third kit and was worn with white shorts and socks in its only outing against Aston Villa.
- Keeper: Umbro made two new goalkeeper strips for the 2011–12 season. The first choice kit was based on the design of the outfield home strip and included the "soundwave" graphic, but in dark green with light green detailing. The second choice kit was dark grey with white detailing, whilst the yellow/black outfit introduced in 2009–10 was retained as an alternative for its third season with yellow socks.

== Friendlies ==
=== Pre-season games ===
==== World Football Challenge ====
Pos	Team	Pld	W	PKW	PKL	L	GF	GA	GD	BP	Pts
1	(Spain) Real Madrid (C)	3	3	0	0	0	9	2	+7	8	17
2	(England) Manchester United	3	3	0	0	0	9	3	+6	8	17
3	(England) Manchester City	3	2	1	0	0	5	2	+3	5	13
4	(Italy) Juventus	3	2	0	0	1	3	2	+1	3	9
5	(Spain) Barcelona	3	1	0	0	2	4	6	−2	4	7
6	(Mexico) Guadalajara	3	1	0	0	2	4	5	−1	3	6
7	(United States) MLS Western (Note: MLS Western Conference composed of one game by the Vancouver Whitecaps and two games by the Los Angeles Galaxy)	3	0	0	1	2	3	7	−4	3	4
8	(United States) MLS Eastern (Note: MLS Eastern Conference composed of one game each by the New England Revolution, Philadelphia Union, and Chicago Fire)	3	0	0	0	3	3	9	−6	3	3
9	(Mexico) Club América	3	0	0	0	3	0	5	−5	0	0

Source: World Football Challenge Standings
Note: Sporting CP played only one game and did not accrue points.
(C) Champion
Notes:

16 July 2011	América	0–2	Manchester City	San Francisco, California, United States
17:00 PST			McGivern 17'; Wright-Phillips 27'	Stadium: AT&T Park; Attendance: 11,250; Referee: Grajeda

18 July 2011	Vancouver Whitecaps	1–2	Manchester City	Vancouver, British Columbia, Canada
19:00 PST	Sanvezzo 30'		Guidetti 68'; Wright-Phillips 84'	Stadium: Empire Field; Attendance: 24,074; Referee: Navarro

24 July 2011	LA Galaxy	1–1 (6–7 p)	Manchester City	Carson, California, United States
13:00 PST	Magee 53'		Balotelli 20' (pen.)	Stadium: Home Depot Center; Attendance: 24,897; Referee: Salazar
	Penalties
	Keat (penalty scored); Birchall (penalty scored); Juninho (penalty missed); Dunivant (penalty scored); Stephens (penalty scored); McBean (penalty missed); Gonzalez (penalty scored); McCarty (penalty scored); DeLaGarza (penalty missed)		(penalty scored) Milner; (penalty scored) Weiss; (penalty scored) Suárez; (penalty scored) Kolarov; (penalty missed) Guidetti; (penalty missed) Lescott; (penalty scored) De Jong; (penalty scored) Wright-Phillips; (penalty scored) Hart

==== Dublin Super Cup ====
===== Table =====
Team	Pld	W	D	L	GF	GA	GD	Pts
(England) Manchester City	2	2	0	0	6	0	+6	12
(Scotland) Celtic	2	1	0	1	5	2	+3	8
(Italy) Internazionale	2	1	0	1	2	3	−1	5
(Republic of Ireland) League of Ireland XI	2	0	0	2	0	8	−8	0

===== Fixtures =====
30 July 2011	Manchester City	3–0	League of Ireland XI	Dublin, Ireland
14:00 BST	Wright-Phillips 52'; Johnson 61'; Scapuzzi 84'	Report (Video)		Stadium: Aviva Stadium; Attendance: 5,114

31 July 2011	Inter Milan	0–3	Manchester City	Dublin, Ireland
16:30 BST		Report	Balotelli 45+1'; Džeko 46'; Johnson 90+3'	Stadium: Aviva Stadium

== Competitions ==
=== FA Community Shield ===
7 August 2011	Manchester City	2–3	Manchester United	London
14:30 BST	Džeko 45+1'; Lescott 38'	Report	Smalling 52'; Nani 58', 90+4'	Stadium: Wembley Stadium; Attendance: 77,169; Referee: Phil Dowd

=== Premier League ===
==== Matches ====
15 August 2011 1	Manchester City	4–0	Swansea City	Manchester
20:00 BST	Džeko 57'; Agüero 68', 90+1'; Silva 71'	Report		Stadium: City of Manchester Stadium; Attendance: 46,802 (2,785 away); Referee: Mike Dean

21 August 2011 2	Bolton Wanderers	2–3	Manchester City	Bolton
16:00 BST	Klasnić 39'; K. Davies 63'	Report	Silva 26'; Barry 37'; Džeko 47'	Stadium: Reebok Stadium; Attendance: 24,273 (4,846 away); Referee: Mike Jones

28 August 2011 3	Tottenham Hotspur	1–5	Manchester City	London
13:30 BST	Kaboul 68'	Report	Džeko 34', 41', 55', 90+3'; Agüero 60'	Stadium: White Hart Lane; Attendance: 36,150 (1,757 away); Referee: Phil Dowd

10 September 2011 4	Manchester City	3–0	Wigan Athletic	Manchester
15:00 BST	Agüero 13', 63', 69'	Report		Stadium: City of Manchester Stadium; Attendance: 46,509 (1,122 away); Referee: Martin Atkinson

18 September 2011 5	Fulham	2–2	Manchester City	London
15:00 BST	Zamora 55'; Kompany 75' (o.g.)	Report	Agüero 18', 46'	Stadium: Craven Cottage; Attendance: 24,750 (1,584 away); Referee: Mark Clattenburg

24 September 2011 6	Manchester City	2–0	Everton	Manchester
12:45 BST	Balotelli 68'; Milner 89'	Report		Stadium: City of Manchester Stadium; Attendance: 47,293 (2,826 away); Referee: Howard Webb

1 October 2011 7	Blackburn Rovers	0–4	Manchester City	Blackburn
15:00 BST		Report	Johnson 56'; Balotelli 59'; Nasri 73'; Savić 87'	Stadium: Ewood Park; Attendance: 24,760 (7,531 away); Referee: Phil Dowd

15 October 2011 8	Manchester City	4–1	Aston Villa	Manchester
15:00 BST	Balotelli 28'; Johnson 47'; Kompany 52'; Milner 71'	Report	Warnock 65'	Stadium: City of Manchester Stadium; Attendance: 47,019 (1,528 away); Referee: Anthony Taylor

23 October 2011 9	Manchester United	1–6	Manchester City	Trafford
13:30 BST	Fletcher 81'	Report	Balotelli 22', 60'; Agüero 69'; Džeko 89', 90+3'; Silva 90+1'	Stadium: Old Trafford; Attendance: 75,487 (2,996 away); Referee: Mark Clattenburg

29 October 2011 10	Manchester City	3–1	Wolverhampton Wanderers	Manchester
15:00 BST	Džeko 52'; Kolarov 67'; Johnson 90+1'	Report	Hunt 75' (pen.)	Stadium: City of Manchester Stadium; Attendance: 47,142 (2,364 away); Referee: Stuart Attwell

5 November 2011 11	Queens Park Rangers	2–3	Manchester City	London
17:30 GMT	Bothroyd 28'; Helguson 69'	Report	Džeko 43'; Silva 52'; Y. Touré 74'	Stadium: Loftus Road; Attendance: 18,076 (3,026 away); Referee: Martin Atkinson

19 November 2011 12	Manchester City	3–1	Newcastle United	Manchester
15:00 BST	Balotelli 41' (pen.); Richards 44'; Agüero 72' (pen.)	Report	Gosling 89'	Stadium: City of Manchester Stadium; Attendance: 47,408 (1,685 away); Referee: Chris Foy

27 November 2011 13	Liverpool	1–1	Manchester City	Liverpool
16:00 GMT	Lescott 33' (o.g.)	Report	Kompany 31'	Stadium: Anfield; Attendance: 45,071 (2,964 away); Referee: Martin Atkinson

3 December 2011 14	Manchester City	5–1	Norwich City	Manchester
15:00 GMT	Agüero 32'; Nasri 51'; Y. Touré 68'; Balotelli 88'; Johnson 90+1'	Report	Morison 81'	Stadium: City of Manchester Stadium; Attendance: 47,201 (2,786 away); Referee: Howard Webb

12 December 2011 15	Chelsea	2–1	Manchester City	London
20:00 GMT	Meireles 34'; Lampard 83' (pen.)	Report	Balotelli 2'	Stadium: Stamford Bridge; Attendance: 41,730 (1,458 away); Referee: Mark Clattenburg

18 December 2011 16	Manchester City	1–0	Arsenal	Manchester
16:10 GMT	Silva 53'	Report		Stadium: City of Manchester Stadium; Attendance: 47,303 (2,796 away); Referee: Phil Dowd

21 December 2011 17	Manchester City	3–0	Stoke City	Manchester
19:45 GMT	Agüero 29', 54'; Johnson 36'	Report		Stadium: City of Manchester Stadium; Attendance: 46,321 (853 away); Referee: Mike Dean

26 December 2011 18	West Bromwich Albion	0–0	Manchester City	West Bromwich
15:00 GMT		Report		Stadium: The Hawthorns; Attendance: 25,938 (2,560 away); Referee: Lee Mason

1 January 2012 19	Sunderland	1–0	Manchester City	Sunderland
15:00 GMT	Ji 90+3'	Report		Stadium: Stadium of Light; Attendance: 40,625 (2,101 away); Referee: Kevin Friend

3 January 2012 20	Manchester City	3–0	Liverpool	Manchester
20:00 GMT	Agüero 10'; Y. Touré 33'; Milner 75' (pen.)	Report		Stadium: Etihad Stadium; Attendance: 47,131 (2,685 away); Referee: Mike Jones

16 January 2012 21	Wigan Athletic	0–1	Manchester City	Wigan
20:00 GMT		Report	Džeko 22'	Stadium: DW Stadium; Attendance: 16,026 (4,406 away); Referee: Martin Atkinson

22 January 2012 22	Manchester City	3–2	Tottenham Hotspur	Manchester
13:30 GMT	Nasri 56'; Lescott 59'; Balotelli 90+5' (pen.)	Report	Defoe 60'; Bale 65'	Stadium: Etihad Stadium; Attendance: 47,422 (2,804 away); Referee: Howard Webb

31 January 2012 23	Everton	1–0	Manchester City	Liverpool
20:00 GMT	Gibson 60'	Report		Stadium: Goodison Park; Attendance: 29,856 (2,485 away); Referee: Peter Walton

4 February 2012 24	Manchester City	3–0	Fulham	Manchester
17:30 GMT	Agüero 10' (pen.); Baird 30' (o.g.); Džeko 72'	Report		Stadium: City of Manchester Stadium; Attendance: 46,963 (741 away); Referee: Mike Dean

12 February 2012 25	Aston Villa	0–1	Manchester City	Birmingham
16:00 GMT		Report	Lescott 63'	Stadium: Villa Park; Attendance: 35,132 (1,350 away); Referee: Michael Oliver

25 February 2012 26	Manchester City	3–0	Blackburn Rovers	Manchester
17:30 GMT	Balotelli 30'; Agüero 52'; Džeko 81'	Report		Stadium: City of Manchester Stadium; Attendance: 46,782 (556 away); Referee: Mike Jones

3 March 2012 27	Manchester City	2–0	Bolton Wanderers	Manchester
15:00 GMT	Steinsson 23' (o.g.); Balotelli 69'	Report		Stadium: City of Manchester Stadium; Attendance: 47,219 (963 away); Referee: Mark Clattenburg

11 March 2012 28	Swansea City	1–0	Manchester City	Swansea
14:00 GMT	Moore 83'	Report		Stadium: Liberty Stadium; Attendance: 20,510 (2,032 away); Referee: Lee Mason

21 March 2012 29	Manchester City	2–1	Chelsea	Manchester
19:45 GMT	Agüero 78' (pen.); Nasri 85'	Report	Cahill 60'	Stadium: City of Manchester Stadium; Attendance: 46,324; Referee: Mike Dean

24 March 2012 30	Stoke City	1–1	Manchester City	Stoke
17:30 GMT	Crouch 59'	Report	Y. Touré 76'	Stadium: Britannia Stadium; Attendance: 27,535; Referee: Howard Webb

31 March 2012 31	Manchester City	3–3	Sunderland	Manchester
15:00 BST	Balotelli 43' (pen.), 85'; Kolarov 86'	Report	Larsson 31', 55'; Bendtner 45+4'	Stadium: City of Manchester Stadium; Attendance: 47,007; Referee: Phil Dowd

8 April 2012 32	Arsenal	1–0	Manchester City	London
16:00 BST	Arteta 87'	Report		Stadium: Emirates Stadium; Attendance: 60,096; Referee: Martin Atkinson

11 April 2012 33	Manchester City	4–0	West Bromwich Albion	Manchester
19:45 BST	Agüero 6', 54'; Tevez 61'; Silva 64'	Report		Stadium: Etihad Stadium; Attendance: 46,746; Referee: Kevin Friend

14 April 2012 34	Norwich City	1–6	Manchester City	Norwich
12:45 BST	Surman 51'	Report	Tevez 18', 73', 80'; Agüero 27', 75'; Johnson 90+3'	Stadium: Carrow Road; Attendance: 26,812; Referee: Chris Foy

22 April 2012 35	Wolverhampton Wanderers	0–2	Manchester City	Wolverhampton
16:00 BST		Report	Agüero 27'; Nasri 74'	Stadium: Molineux; Attendance: 24,576; Referee: Lee Probert

30 April 2012 36	Manchester City	1–0	Manchester United	Manchester
20:00 BST	Kompany 45+1'	Report		Stadium: Etihad Stadium; Attendance: 47,259; Referee: Andre Marriner

6 May 2012 37	Newcastle United	0–2	Manchester City	Newcastle upon Tyne
13:30 BST		Report	Y. Touré 70', 89'	Stadium: St James' Park; Attendance: 52,389; Referee: Howard Webb

13 May 2012 38	Manchester City	3–2	Queens Park Rangers	Manchester
15:00 BST	Zabaleta 39'; Džeko 90+2'; Agüero 90+4'	Report	Cissé 48'; Mackie 66'	Stadium: Etihad Stadium; Attendance: 47,435; Referee: Mike Dean

==== League table ====
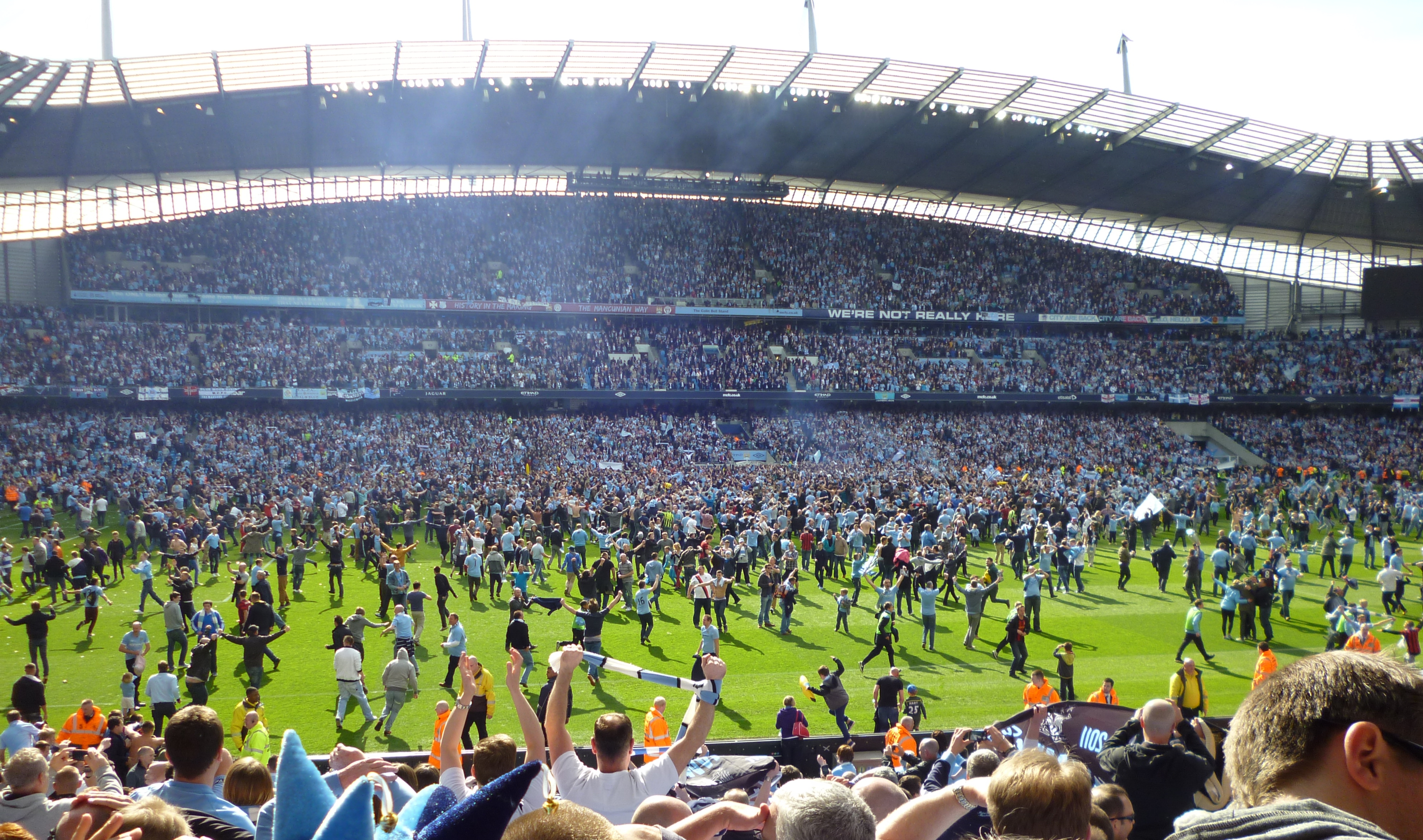
Manchester City supporters invade the pitch following their final day victory over QPR, the club's first top flight title in 44 years

Pos	Team	Pld	W	D	L	GF	GA	GD	Pts	Qualification or relegation
1	Manchester City (C)	38	28	5	5	93	29	+64	89	Qualification for the Champions League group stage
2	Manchester United	38	28	5	5	89	33	+56	89	Qualification for the Champions League group stage
3	Arsenal	38	21	7	10	74	49	+25	70	Qualification for the Champions League group stage
4	Tottenham Hotspur	38	20	9	9	66	41	+25	69	Qualification for the Europa League group stage (Note: Chelsea won the Champions League and thus qualified for the group stage as defending champions, forfeiting their spot in the Europa League as the FA Cup winners. This meant that Tottenham were to compete in the Europa League group stage, since, pursuant to the rules, only four clubs from the Premier League could play in the Champions League.)
5	Newcastle United	38	19	8	11	56	51	+5	65	Qualification for the Europa League play-off round

Source: Barclays Premier League
Rules for classification: 1) points; 2) goal difference; 3) number of goals scored.
(C) Champions

==== Results summary ====
Overall								Home						Away					
Pld	W	D	L	GF	GA	GD	Pts	W	D	L	GF	GA	GD	W	D	L	GF	GA	GD
38	28	5	5	93	29	+64	89	18	1	0	55	12	+43	10	4	5	38	17	+21

Last updated: 13 May 2012.
Source: Premier League

==== Points breakdown ====
Points at home: 55
Points away from home: 34

Points against 2010/11 Top Four: 12
Points against promoted teams: 15

6 points: Aston Villa, Blackburn Rovers, Bolton Wanderers, Manchester United,

Newcastle United, Norwich City, Queens Park Rangers, Tottenham Hotspur
Wigan Athletic, Wolverhampton Wanderers

4 points: Fulham, Liverpool, Stoke City, West Bromwich Albion
3 points: Arsenal, Chelsea, Everton, Swansea City
1 point: Sunderland

==== Biggest & smallest ====
Biggest home win: 5–1 vs. Norwich City, 3 December 2011
Biggest home defeat: Undefeated
Biggest away win: 1–6 vs. Manchester United, 23 October 2011; vs. Norwich City, 14 April 2012
Biggest away defeat: 5 by a 1-goal margin

Biggest home attendance: 47,435 vs. Queens Park Rangers, 13 May 2012
Smallest home attendance: 46,321 vs. Stoke City, 21 December 2011
Biggest away attendance: 75,487 vs. Manchester United, 23 October 2011
Smallest away attendance: 16,026 vs. Wigan Athletic, 16 January 2012

==== Results by match ====
Round	1	2	3	4	5	6	7	8	9	10	11	12	13	14	15	16	17	18	19	20	21	22	23	24	25	26	27	28	29	30	31	32	33	34	35	36	37	38
Ground	H	A	A	H	A	H	A	H	A	H	A	H	A	H	A	H	H	A	A	H	A	H	A	H	A	H	H	A	H	A	H	A	H	A	A	H	A	H
Result	W	W	W	W	D	W	W	W	W	W	W	W	D	W	L	W	W	D	L	W	W	W	L	W	W	W	W	L	W	D	D	L	W	W	W	W	W	W
Position	2	1	2	2	2	2	2	1	1	1	1	1	1	1	1	1	1	1	1	1	1	1	1	1	1	1	1	2	2	2	2	2	2	2	2	1	1	1

Updated to match(es) played on 13 May 2012. Source: Premier League results
A = Away; H = Home; W = Win; D = Draw; L = Loss

=== FA Cup ===
8 January 2012 Third round	Manchester City	2–3	Manchester United	Manchester
13:00 GMT	Kolarov 48'; Agüero 65'	Report	Rooney 10', 40'; Welbeck 30'	Stadium: Etihad Stadium; Attendance: 46,808; Referee: Chris Foy

=== Football League Cup ===
21 September 2011 Third round	Manchester City	2–0	Birmingham City	Manchester
19:45	Hargreaves 17'; Balotelli 38'	Report		Stadium: Etihad Stadium; Attendance: 25,070; Referee: Kevin Friend

26 October 2011 Fourth round	Wolverhampton Wanderers	2–5	Manchester City	Wolverhampton
19:45	Milijaš 18'; O'Hara 65'	Report	Johnson 37'; Nasri 39'; Džeko 40', 64'; De Vries 50' (o.g.)	Stadium: Molineux; Attendance: 12,436; Referee: Neil Swarbrick

29 November 2011 Quarter-finals	Arsenal	0–1	Manchester City	London
20:00 GMT		Report	Agüero 83'	Stadium: Emirates Stadium; Attendance: 60,028; Referee: Lee Probert

11 January 2012 Semi-finals; First leg	Manchester City	0–1	Liverpool	Manchester
19:45 GMT		Report	Gerrard 13' (pen.)	Stadium: Etihad Stadium; Attendance: 36,017; Referee: Lee Mason

25 January 2012 Semi-finals; Second leg	Liverpool	2–2 (3–2 agg.)	Manchester City	Liverpool
19:45 GMT	Gerrard 41' (pen.); Bellamy 73'	Report	De Jong 32'; Džeko 67'	Stadium: Anfield; Attendance: 44,590; Referee: Phil Dowd

=== UEFA Champions League ===
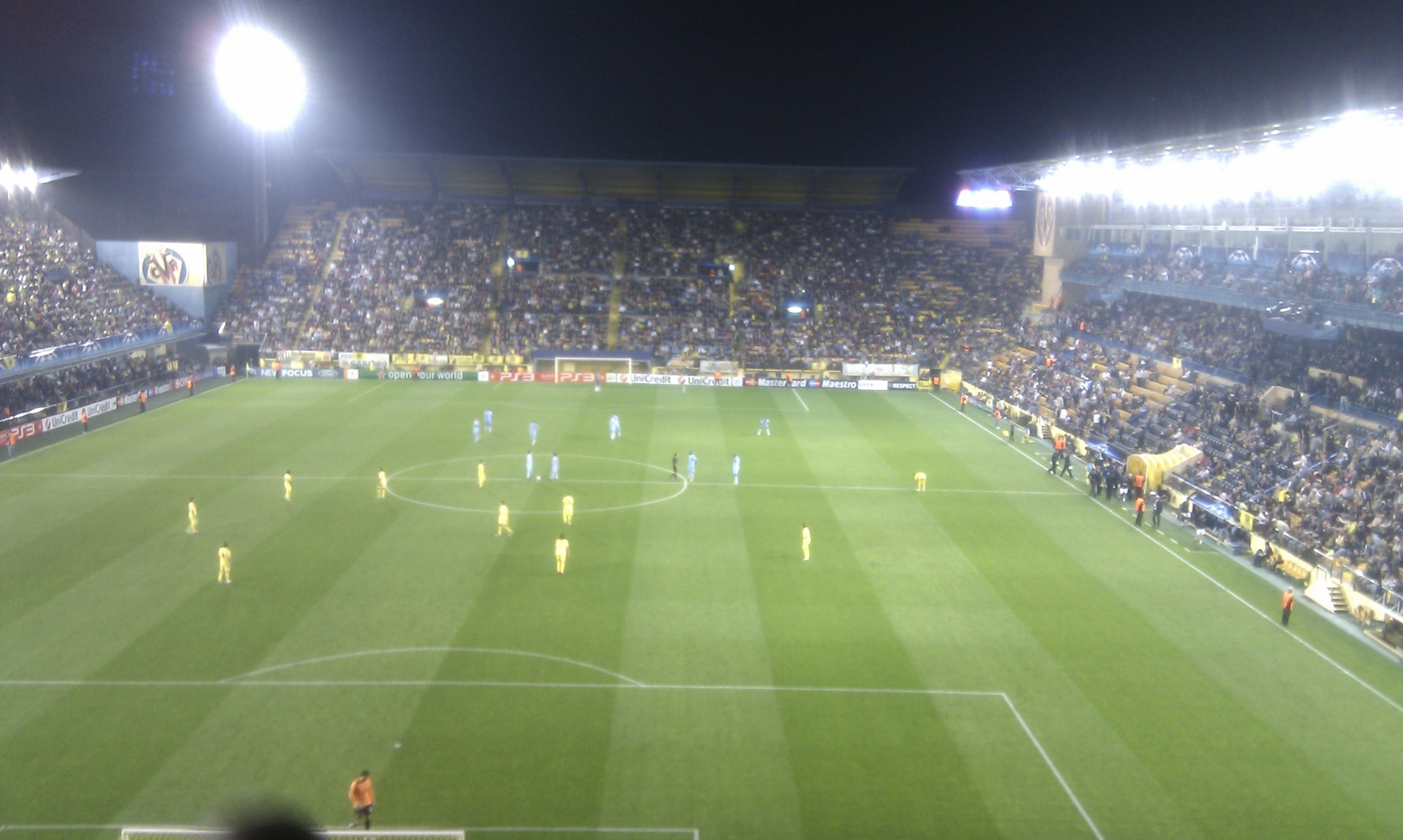
Group stage match at Villarreal's Estadio El Madrigal

==== Group stage ====
Pos	Team	Pld	W	D	L	GF	GA	GD	Pts	Qualification
1	(Germany) Bayern Munich	6	4	1	1	11	6	+5	13	Advance to knockout phase
2	(Italy) Napoli	6	3	2	1	10	6	+4	11	Advance to knockout phase
3	(England) Manchester City	6	3	1	2	9	6	+3	10	Transfer to Europa League
4	(Spain) Villarreal	6	0	0	6	2	14	−12	0	

Source: Soccerway

14 September 2011 1	Manchester City (England)	1–1	(Italy) Napoli	Manchester, England
20:45 CEST	Kolarov 75'	Report	Cavani 69'	Stadium: Etihad Stadium; Attendance: 44,026; Referee: Jonas Eriksson (Sweden)

27 September 2011 2	Bayern Munich (Germany)	2–0	(England) Manchester City	Munich, Germany
20:45 CEST	Gómez 38', 45+1'	Report		Stadium: Allianz Arena; Attendance: 65,000; Referee: Viktor Kassai (Hungary)

18 October 2011 3	Manchester City (England)	2–1	(Spain) Villarreal	Manchester, England
19:45 BST	Marchena 43' (o.g.); Agüero 90+3'	Report	Cani 4'	Stadium: City of Manchester Stadium; Attendance: 42,236; Referee: Pavel Královec (Czech Republic)

2 November 2011 4	Villarreal (Spain)	0–3	(England) Manchester City	Villarreal, Spain
20:45 CET		Report	Y. Touré 30', 71'; Balotelli 45+3' (pen.)	Stadium: Estadio El Madrigal; Attendance: 24,235; Referee: Pedro Proença (Portugal)

22 November 2011 5	Napoli (Italy)	2–1	(England) Manchester City	Naples, Italy
20:45 CET	Cavani 17', 49'	Report	Balotelli 33'	Stadium: Stadio San Paolo; Attendance: 53,000; Referee: Damir Skomina (Slovenia)

7 December 2011 6	Manchester City (England)	2–0	(Germany) Bayern Munich	Manchester, England
20:45 CET	Silva 36'; Y. Touré 52'	Report		Stadium: City of Manchester Stadium; Attendance: 46,002; Referee: Stéphane Lannoy (France)

=== UEFA Europa League ===
==== Knockout phase ====
===== Round of 32 =====
16 February 2012 First leg	Porto (Portugal)	1–2	(England) Manchester City	Porto, Portugal
21:05 CET	Varela 27'	Report	Pereira 55' (o.g.); Agüero 84'	Stadium: Estádio do Dragão; Attendance: 47,417; Referee: Cüneyt Çakır (Turkey)

22 February 2012 Second leg	Manchester City (England)	4–0 (6–1 agg.)	(Portugal) Porto	Manchester, England
18:00 CET	Agüero 1'; Džeko 76'; Silva 84'; Pizarro 86'	Report		Stadium: City of Manchester Stadium; Attendance: 39,538; Referee: Wolfgang Stark (Germany)

===== Round of 16 =====
8 March 2012 First leg	Sporting CP (Portugal)	1–0	(England) Manchester City	Lisbon, Portugal
19:00 CET	Xandão 51'	Report		Stadium: Estádio José Alvalade; Attendance: 34,371; Referee: Carlos Velasco Carballo (Spain)

15 March 2012 Second leg	Manchester City (England)	3–2 (a) (3–3 agg.)	(Portugal) Sporting CP	Manchester, England
21:05 CET	Agüero 60', 82'; Balotelli 75' (pen.)	Report	Fernández 33'; Van Wolfswinkel 40'	Stadium: City of Manchester Stadium; Attendance: 38,021; Referee: Tom Hagen (Norway)
Note: Manchester City were eliminated on the away goals rule.

== Statistics ==
=== Squad information ===
N	Pos.	Nat.	Name	Age	EU	Since	App	Goals	Ends	Transfer fee	Notes
2	RB	(England)	Micah Richards	24	EU	2005	189	9	2015	Youth system	
3	LB	(England)	Wayne Bridge	31	EU	2009 (Winter)	58	0	2013	£10M	
4	CB	(Belgium)	Vincent Kompany (captain)	26	EU	2008	140	4	2014	£6M	
5	RB	(Argentina)	Pablo Zabaleta	27	Non-EU	2008	103	3	2015	£6M	
6	CB	(England)	Joleon Lescott	29	EU	2009	62	5	2014	£22M	
7	AM	(England)	James Milner	26	EU	2010	39	2	2015	£24M	
10	FW	(Bosnia and Herzegovina)	Edin Džeko	26	Non-EU	2011 (Winter)	33	18	2015	£27M	
11	AM	(England)	Adam Johnson	24	EU	2010 (Winter)	68	11	2016	£7M	
12	GK	(England)	Stuart Taylor	31	EU	2009	0	0	2012	Free	
13	LB	(Serbia)	Aleksandar Kolarov	26	Non-EU	2010	47	5	2015	£16M	
15	CB	(Montenegro)	Stefan Savić	21	Non-EU	2011	6	1	2015	£6M	
16	FW	(Argentina)	Sergio Agüero	24	EU	2011	12	13	2016	£35M	
18	CM	(England)	Gareth Barry	31	EU	2009	94	6	2014	£12M	
19	AM	(France)	Samir Nasri	25	EU	2011	10	2	2015	£25M	
20	CM	(England)	Owen Hargreaves	31	EU	2011	2	1	2012	Free	
21	AM	(Spain)	David Silva	26	EU	2010	67	9	2014	£24M	
22	LB	(France)	Gaël Clichy	26	EU	2011	6	0	2015	£7M	
25	GK	(England)	Joe Hart	25	EU	2006	126	0	2016	£1.5M	
28	CB	(Ivory Coast)	Kolo Touré	31	Non-EU	2009	57	3	2013	£16M	
30	GK	(Romania)	Costel Pantilimon	25	EU	2011	3	0	2012	Loan	
32	FW	(Argentina)	Carlos Tevez	28	Non-EU	2009	84	52	2014	£25.5M	
34	CM	(Netherlands)	Nigel de Jong	27	EU	2009 (Winter)	99	1	2013	£18M	
42	CM	(Ivory Coast)	Yaya Touré	29	Non-EU	2010	62	10	2015	£24M	
45	FW	(Italy)	Mario Balotelli	21	EU	2010	36	16	2015	£22.5M	

- Last updated: 29 October 2011
- Source: , Transfers, Wikipedia players' articles (for player numbers, appearances, goals and contracts).
- Ordered by squad number.

=== Playing statistics ===
As of 13 May 2012

Appearances (Apps.) numbers are for appearances in competitive games only.
Apps. numbers denote: "no. of games started (no. of games subbed on)."
Red card numbers denote: "no. of second yellow cards / no. of straight red cards."
Numbers in parentheses represent red cards overturned for wrongful dismissal.

No.	Pos.	Player name	Premier League				Champions League				Europa League				FA Cup				League Cup				Community Shield				TOTALS All competitions			
No.	Pos.	Player name	Apps.		Yellow card	Red card	Apps.		Yellow card	Red card	Apps.		Yellow card	Red card	Apps.		Yellow card	Red card	Apps.		Yellow card	Red card	Apps.		Yellow card	Red card	Apps.		Yellow card	Red card
2	DF	(England) Micah Richards	23(6)	1	2		1				3		1		1				2				1		1		31(6)	1	4	
3	DF	(England) Wayne Bridge																	1								1			
4	DF	(Belgium) Vincent Kompany (c)	31	3	5	1	6		1		3		1		1			1					1				42	3	7	2
5	DF	(Argentina) Pablo Zabaleta	18(3)	1	5		4		1		0(1)				0(1)				4								26(5)	1	6	
6	DF	(England) Joleon Lescott	31(1)	2	1		4				2(1)				1				2				1	1			40(2)	3	1	
7	MF	(England) James Milner	17(9)	3	3		2(2)				1(1)				1				1(2)				1		1		23(14)	3	4	
8	MF	(Chile) David Pizarro	1(4)								1(1)	1															2(5)	1		
10	FW	(Bosnia and Herzegovina) Edin Džeko	16(15)	14	1		5				1(2)	1							3(1)	3			1	1	1		26(17)	19	2	
11	MF	(England) Adam Johnson	10(16)	6	1		1(4)				1				1				3(1)	1			0(1)				16(22)	7	1	
13	DF	(Serbia) Aleksandar Kolarov	9(3)	2	1		3(2)	1	1		2(1)		2		1	1			4(1)		1		1		1		20(7)	4	6	
15	DF	(Montenegro) Stefan Savić	5(6)	1	1		2				1		1		0(1)				5		1						13(7)	1	3	
16	FW	(Argentina) Sergio Agüero	31(3)	23	2		3(3)	1	1		3(1)	4			1	1			1(2)	1							39(9)	30	3	
18	MF	(England) Gareth Barry	31(3)	1	8	1	3(1)				3		1						2				0(1)				39(5)	1	9	1
19	MF	(France) Samir Nasri	26(4)	5	2		5(1)				2(2)		1		1				3(1)	1	1						37(8)	6	4	
20	MF	(England) Owen Hargreaves	0(1)												0(1)				2	1	1						2(2)	1	1	
21	MF	(Spain) David Silva	33(3)	6			6	1	1		4	1			1				1				1				46(3)	8	1	
22	DF	(France) Gaël Clichy	28		1	1	3(1)		1		3								1				0(1)				35(2)		2	1
25	GK	(England) Joe Hart	38				6				4								2				1				51			
28	DF	(Ivory Coast) Kolo Touré (vc)	8(6)				1		1		2								3								14(6)		1	
30	GK	(Romania) Costel Pantilimon													1				3								4			
32	FW	(Argentina) Carlos Tevez	7(6)	4	1		0(1)												1								8(7)	4	1	
34	MF	(Netherlands) Nigel de Jong (vc)	11(10)		5		3(2)				3(1)		2		1				4	1			1				23(13)	1	7	
36	MF	(Spain) Denis Suárez																	0(1)								0(1)			
42	MF	(Ivory Coast) Yaya Touré	31(1)	6	8		6	3	1		3		3										1		1		41(1)	9	13	
44	DF	(Netherlands) Karim Rekik																	0(2)								0(2)			
45	FW	(Italy) Mario Balotelli	14(9)	13	3	2	2(1)	2	2		2(1)	1	1						2	1			1				21(11)	17	6	2
49	FW	(Italy) Luca Scapuzzi																	1(1)								1(1)			
62	MF	(Ivory Coast) Abdul Razak	0(1)																2(1)								2(2)			
-	DF	(England) Nedum Onuoha	0(1)																2								2(1)			
		Own goals		2				1				1								1								5		
TOTALS				93	52	5		9	10			9	13			2		1		10	4			2	5			125	81	6
TOTALS					Yellow card	Red card			Yellow card	Red card			Yellow card	Red card			Yellow card	Red card			Yellow card	Red card			Yellow card	Red card			Yellow card	Red card

Statistics correct as of 13 May 2012

Last updated: 13 May 2012.
Source: (for players and positions) Season 2011–12 First Team Squad (for squad numbers) Season 2011–12 Squad Numbers (for actual stats). All match reports are in Competitive games section above.

=== Goalscorers ===
Ranking	Player	Premier League	Champions League	Europa League	FA Cup	League Cup	Community Shield	Total
1	Sergio Agüero	23	1	4	1	1	0	30
2	Edin Džeko	14	0	1	0	3	1	19
3	Mario Balotelli	13	2	1	0	1	0	17
4	Yaya Touré	6	3	0	0	0	0	9
5	David Silva	6	1	1	0	0	0	8
6	Adam Johnson	6	0	0	0	1	0	7
7	Samir Nasri	5	0	0	0	1	0	6
8	Own goal	2	1	1	0	1	0	5
9	Carlos Tevez	4	0	0	0	0	0	4
9	Aleksandar Kolarov	2	1	0	1	0	0	4
11	Vincent Kompany	3	0	0	0	0	0	3
11	James Milner	3	0	0	0	0	0	3
11	Joleon Lescott	2	0	0	0	0	1	3
14	Gareth Barry	1	0	0	0	0	0	1
14	Micah Richards	1	0	0	0	0	0	1
14	Stefan Savić	1	0	0	0	0	0	1
14	Pablo Zabaleta	1	0	0	0	0	0	1
14	David Pizarro	0	0	1	0	0	0	1
14	Nigel de Jong	0	0	0	0	1	0	1
14	Owen Hargreaves	0	0	0	0	1	0	1
	Total	93	9	9	2	10	2	125

== Awards ==
=== Premier League Player of the Season award ===
Awarded to the outstanding player of the season as judged by a panel assembled by the Premier League's sponsor.

Season	Player
2011–12	(Belgium) Vincent Kompany

=== Premier League Manager of the Month award ===
Awarded monthly to the manager that was chosen by a panel assembled by the Premier League's sponsor.

Month	Manager
November	(Italy) Roberto Mancini

=== Premier League Player of the Month award ===
Awarded monthly to the player that was chosen by a panel assembled by the Premier League's sponsor.

Month	Player
August	(Bosnia and Herzegovina) Edin Džeko
September	(Spain) David Silva

=== Premier League Golden Glove award ===
Awarded to the goalkeeper who kept the most clean sheets over the 2011–12 Premier League season.

Player	Clean sheets
Joe Hart	17

=== PFA Team of the Year ===
The combined best 11 from all teams in the Premier League chosen by the PFA.

Player	Position
(England) Joe Hart	Goalkeeper
(Belgium) Vincent Kompany	Defence
(Spain) David Silva	Midfield
(Ivory Coast) Yaya Touré	Midfield

=== LMA Performance of the Week award ===
Awarded on a weekly basis to the Premier League or Football League team that a five-man LMA adjudication panel deems to have performed in some outstanding manner.

Week ending	For performance in
27 October 2011	Manchester United 1 – 6 Manchester City
13 May 2012	Newcastle United 0 – 2 Manchester City

=== Etihad Player of the Year awards ===
Player	Season 2011–12 awards
(Argentina) Sergio Agüero	Player of the Year
(Spain) David Silva	Players' Player of the Year
(Spain) Denis Suárez	Young Player of the Year
(Argentina) Sergio Agüero	Goal of the Season; Norwich City 1 – 6 Manchester City (27th-minute goal)
Manchester Derby Double	Moment of the season
(Belgium) Vincent Kompany	City in the Community Player of the Year
(Spain) David Silva	EA Sports Player Performance Index Award

=== Etihad Player of the Month awards ===
Awarded to the player that receives the most votes in a poll conducted each month on the official website of Manchester City.

Month	Player
August	(Bosnia and Herzegovina) Edin Džeko
September	(Spain) David Silva
October	(Italy) Mario Balotelli
November	(England) James Milner
December	(England) Gareth Barry
January	(England) Joe Hart
February	(Argentina) Sergio Agüero
March	(France) Samir Nasri

=== 2011 CAF African Footballer of the Year award ===
Awarded every calendar year from a shortlist of three based on a vote of the 53 CAF national team managers.

Year	Player
2011	(Ivory Coast) Yaya Touré

=== 2011 FSS Serbian Player of the Year award ===
Awarded every calendar year in conjunction with the FSS Coach of the Year award.

Year	Player
2011	(Serbia) Aleksandar Kolarov

== Transfers and loans ==
=== Transfers in ===
First team
Date	Pos.	No.	Player	From club	Transfer fee
4 July 2011	DF	22	(France) Gaël Clichy	(England) Arsenal	£10,000,000
6 July 2011	DF	15	(Montenegro) Stefan Savić	(Serbia) Partizan	£15,000,000
28 July 2011	FW	16	(Argentina) Sergio Agüero	(Spain) Atlético Madrid	£36,000,000
24 August 2011	MF	19	(France) Samir Nasri	(England) Arsenal	£24,000,000
31 August 2011	MF	20	(England) Owen Hargreaves	Free agent	
31 January 2012	GK	30	(Romania) Costel Pantilimon	(Romania) Politehnica Timișoara	undisclosed

Reserves and Academy
Date	Pos.	No.	Player	From club	Transfer fee
1 June 2011	MF	–	(Spain) Denis Suárez	(Spain) Celta Vigo	£900,000
16 June 2011	MF	–	(Netherlands) Karim Rekik	(Netherlands) Feyenoord	Undisclosed
28 June 2011	GK	–	(England) Angus Gunn	(England) Norwich City	Undisclosed
15 July 2011	FW	–	(Sweden) John Guidetti	Re-signed	

=== Transfers out ===
First team
Exit Date	Pos.	No.	Player	To club	Transfer fee
1 June 2011	FW	20	(Ecuador) Felipe Caicedo	(Russia) Lokomotiv Moscow	£9,500,000
1 June 2011	MF	24	(France) Patrick Vieira	Unattached	Retired
14 July 2011	DF	17	(Germany) Jérôme Boateng	(Germany) Bayern Munich	£12,500,000
18 July 2011	GK	1	(Republic of Ireland) Shay Given	(England) Aston Villa	£7,000,000
20 July 2011	FW	27	(Brazil) Jô	(Brazil) Internacional	£8,000,000
31 August 2011	FW	39	(Wales) Craig Bellamy	(England) Liverpool	Free
31 August 2011	MF	8	(England) Shaun Wright-Phillips	(England) Queens Park Rangers	£6,000,000
26 January 2012	DF		(England) Nedum Onuoha	(England) Queens Park Rangers	£4,000,000

Reserves and Academy
Exit Date	Pos.	No.	Player	To club	Transfer fee
1 June 2011	DF	35	(England) Scott Kay	(England) Macclesfield Town	Free
1 June 2011	FW	47	(England) James Poole	(England) Hartlepool United	Free
1 June 2011	DF	30	(England) Shaleum Logan	(England) Brentford	Free
1 June 2011	DF	–	(Norway) Kim Skogsrud	(Scotland) Rangers	Free
1 June 2011	DF	–	(Norway) Tom Skogsrud	(Scotland) Rangers	Free
1 June 2011	MF	–	(England) Andrew Tutte	(England) Rochdale	Free
1 June 2011	DF	36	(England) Javan Vidal	(England) Yeovil Town	Free
1 July 2011	MF	49	(Republic of Ireland) Donal McDermott	(England) Huddersfield Town	Free
31 January 2012	DF	56	(Switzerland) Frédéric Veseli	(England) Manchester United	Undisclosed

=== Loans in ===
First team
Start date	End date	Pos.	Player	From club
5 August 2011	31 January 2012	GK	(Romania) Costel Pantilimon	(Romania) Poli Timișoara
31 January 2012	31 May 2012	MF	(Chile) David Pizarro	(Italy) Roma

=== Loans out ===
First team
Start date	End date	Pos.	No.	Player	To club
1 July 2011	31 December 2011	GK	26	(Colombia) David González	(Scotland) Aberdeen
28 July 2011	31 May 2012	MF	6	(England) Michael Johnson	(England) Leicester City
25 August 2011	31 May 2012	FW	9	(Togo) Emmanuel Adebayor	(England) Tottenham Hotspur
26 August 2011	31 May 2012	DF	38	(Belgium) Dedryck Boyata	(England) Bolton Wanderers
27 August 2011	31 May 2012	FW	14	(Paraguay) Roque Santa Cruz	(Spain) Real Betis
29 August 2011	31 May 2012	MF	40	(Slovakia) Vladimír Weiss	(Spain) Espanyol
16 September 2011	16 December 2011	FW	43	(England) Alex Nimely	(England) Middlesbrough
25 October 2011	31 December 2011	DF	33	(Republic of Ireland) Greg Cunningham	(England) Nottingham Forest
28 October 2011	31 December 2011	MF	62	(Ivory Coast) Abdul Razak	(England) Portsmouth

Reserves and Academy
Start date	End date	Pos.	No.	Player	To club
28 June 2011	1 January 2012	MF	–	(Ghana) Mohammed Abu	(Norway) Strømsgodset IF
14 July 2011	31 May 2012	DF	41	(England) Ben Mee	(England) Burnley
26 July 2011	31 May 2012	DF	51	(England) Kieran Trippier	(England) Burnley
31 July 2011	31 May 2012	MF	50	(Norway) Abdisalam Ibrahim	(Netherlands) NEC
3 August 2011	3 September 2011	DF	48	(Republic of Ireland) Ryan McGivern	(England) Crystal Palace
29 August 2011	December 2011	GK	46	(Germany) Loris Karius	(Germany) Mainz 05
31 August 2011	31 May 2012	DF	48	(Republic of Ireland) Ryan McGivern	(England) Bristol City
31 August 2011	31 May 2012	MF		(Libya) Ahmed Benali	(England) Rochdale
31 August 2011	31 May 2012	FW	60	(Sweden) John Guidetti	(Netherlands) Feyenoord
23 November 2011	2 January 2012	MF	53	(England) Chris Chantler	(England) Carlisle United
