= Anna Scaife =

Radio astronomer

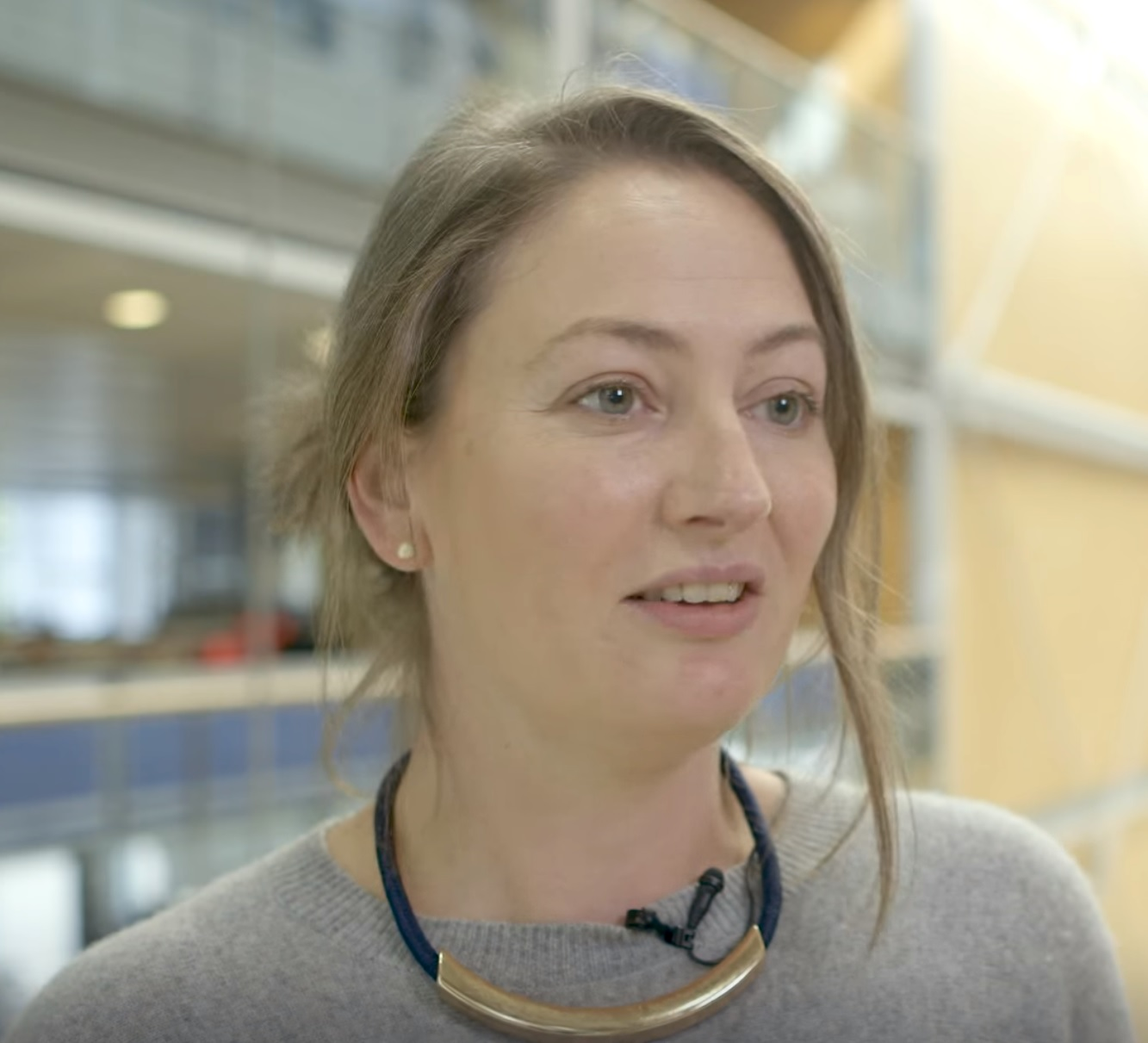
- Anna Scaife discusses the Square Kilometre Array for the World Economic Forum in 2017
- Born: Anna Margaret Mahala Scaife; 20 May 1981 (age 45)
- Education: Loreto Grammar School
- Alma mater: University of Bristol (MPhys); University of Cambridge (PhD)
- Known for: Big data astrophysics
- Awards: Jackson-Gwilt Medal (2019)
- Scientific career
- Fields: Radio astronomy
- Workplaces: University of Manchester; University of Cambridge; Dublin Institute for Advanced Studies; University of Southampton
- Thesis: Observing the cosmic microwave background with the Very Small Array (2007)
- Doctoral advisor: Keith Grainge
- Website: research.manchester.ac.uk/en/persons/anna.scaife

Anna Margaret Mahala Scaife (born 20 May 1981) is a Professor of Radio Astronomy at the University of Manchester and Head of the Jodrell Bank Centre for Astrophysics Interferometry Centre of Excellence. She is the co-director of Policy@Manchester. She was awarded the Jackson-Gwilt Medal by the Royal Astronomical Society in 2019 in recognition of her contributions to astrophysical instrumentation.

== Education and early life ==
Scaife wanted to be an archaeologist as a child. She attended school at Loreto Grammar School in Altrincham. She earned her master's degree in physics at the University of Bristol in 2003. For her doctoral studies, Scaife joined the University of Cambridge where she was supervised by Keith Grainge. After graduating in 2007, Scaife stayed at Cambridge as a postdoctoral research associate at the Cavendish Laboratory and was a Fellow of Selwyn College, Cambridge.

== Research and career ==
Her research investigates the origin and evolution of large-scale cosmic magnetic fields. She was a research scientist at the Dublin Institute for Advanced Studies, where she was involved in testing for the James Webb Space Telescope. Scaife joined the University of Southampton as an associate professor in Radio Astronomy. Here she worked on Bayesian data analysis, the Sunyaev–Zeldovich effect and radio astronomy instrumentation. She identified anomalous microwave emission coming from regions of star formation. She was part of the Arcminute Microkelvin Imager Large Array (AMI-LA), using which she observed young stellar objects in the Perseus molecular cloud.

She moved to the University of Manchester where she was appointed Head of the Jodrell Bank Centre for Astrophysics Interferometry Centre of Excellence. Her research was funded by a European Research Council Starting Grant fellowship from 2013 to 2018. From 2016, Scaife led the imaging pipeline group for the Square Kilometre Array science data processor consortium. She was the Principal Investigator for the LOFAR magnetism key science project. She was part of the commissioning team for the LOFAR telescope, which is a pathfinder instrument for the Square Kilometre Array. At Jodrell Bank, Scaife leads the design of the computing for the European SKA Regional Centre, through the big data project AENEAS. She runs two Science and Technology Facilities Council Newton Fund programs that offer bursaries for scientists from Southern Africa and Latin America. She has established a UK - South Africa program that develops capacity in big data and data science in South Africa. Scaife is interested in using deep learning to study astronomically big data.

Scaife was part of a team of astrophysicists, including Jane Greaves, who identified nanodiamonds in three infant star systems, V892 Tau, HD 97048 and MWC 297 in the Milky Way. She found that the anomalous microwave emission (AME) from the Milky Way might be due to hydrogenated nanodiamonds. Scaife had previously observed AME from circumstellar discs when working with Dave Green at the University of Cambridge.

Scaife also holds the 2017 Blaauw Chair at the University of Groningen. She contributed to the textbook Optical and Digital Image Processing: Fundamentals and Applications.

== Awards and honours ==
Her awards and honours include:

- 2019 Royal Astronomical Society (RAS) Jackson-Gwilt Medal
- 2014 World Economic Forum Top 30 scientists under 40
