= Jackson-Gwilt Medal =

- Website: https://ras.ac.uk/awards-and-grants/awards/2275-jackson-gwilt-medal

The Jackson-Gwilt Medal is an award that has been issued by the Royal Astronomical Society (RAS) since 1897. The original criteria were for the invention, improvement, or development of astronomical instrumentation or techniques; for achievement in observational astronomy; or for achievement in research into the history of astronomy. In 2017, the history of astronomy category was removed for subsequent awards and was transferred to a new award, the Agnes Mary Clerke Medal.

The frequency of the medal has varied over time. Initially, it was irregular, with gaps of between three and five years between awards. From 1968 onwards, it was awarded regularly every three years; from 2004 every two years; and since 2008 it has been awarded every year.

The award is named after Hannah Jackson née Gwilt. She was a niece of Joseph Gwilt (an architect and Fellow of the RAS) and daughter of George Gwilt (another Fellow); Hannah donated the original funds for the medal. It is the second oldest award issued by the RAS, after the Gold Medal.

== List of winners ==
Source is unless otherwise noted.

| Year | Winners | Reference |
|---|---|---|
| 1897 | Lewis Swift | |
| 1902 | Thomas David Anderson | |
| 1905 | John Tebbutt | |
| 1909 | Philibert Jacques Melotte | |
| 1913 | Thomas Henry Espinell Compton Espin | |
| 1918 | Theodore E. R. Phillips | |
| 1923 | A. Stanley Williams and William Sadler Franks | |
| 1928 | William Reid and William Herbert Steavenson | |
| 1931 | Clyde William Tombaugh | |
| 1935 | Walter Frederick Gale | |
| 1938 | Frederick J. Hargreaves and Percy Mayow Ryves | |
| 1942 | Reginald Lawson Waterfield | |
| 1946 | Harold William Newton | |
| 1949 | Algernon Montagu Newbegin | |
| 1953 | John Philip Manning Prentice | |
| 1956 | Reginald Purdon de Kock | |
| 1960 | Frank Bateson and Albert F. A. L. Jones | |
| 1963 | George Eric Deacon Alcock | |
| 1968 | John Guy Porter | |
| 1971 | Alan William James Cousins | |
| 1974 | Geoffrey Perry | |
| 1977 | Patrick Moore | |
| 1980 | Roger Griffin | |
| 1983 | Grote Reber | |
| 1986 | David Malin | |
| 1989 | Richard Edwin Hills | |
| 1992 | Richard Stephenson | |
| 1995 | Janet Akyüz Mattei | |
| 1998 | Alexander Boksenberg | |
| 2001 | John E. Baldwin | |
| 2004 | Pat Wallace | |
| 2006 | Keith Taylor | |
| 2008 | Stephen Shectman | |
| 2009 | Peter Ade | |
| 2010 | Craig Mackay | |
| 2011 | Matt Griffin | |
| 2012 | Joss Bland-Hawthorn | |
| 2013 | Vikram Dhillon | |
| 2014 | George W. Fraser | |
| 2015 | Allan Chapman | |
| 2016 | Bruce Swinyard | |
| 2017 | Ian Parry | |
| 2018 | Wayne Holland | |
| 2019 | Anna Scaife | |
| 2020 | Roland Bacon | |
| 2021 | Floor van Leeuwen | |
| 2022 | Frank Eisenhauer | |
| 2023 | Roberto Abraham, Pieter van Dokkum | |
| 2024 | Keith Bannister & Ryan Shannon | |
| 2025 | Anna Moore | |
| 2026 | Alistair Glasse | |

== See also ==
- List of astronomy awards
