= Richard Edwin Hills =

British astronomer (1945–2022)

Richard Hills FRS FRAS
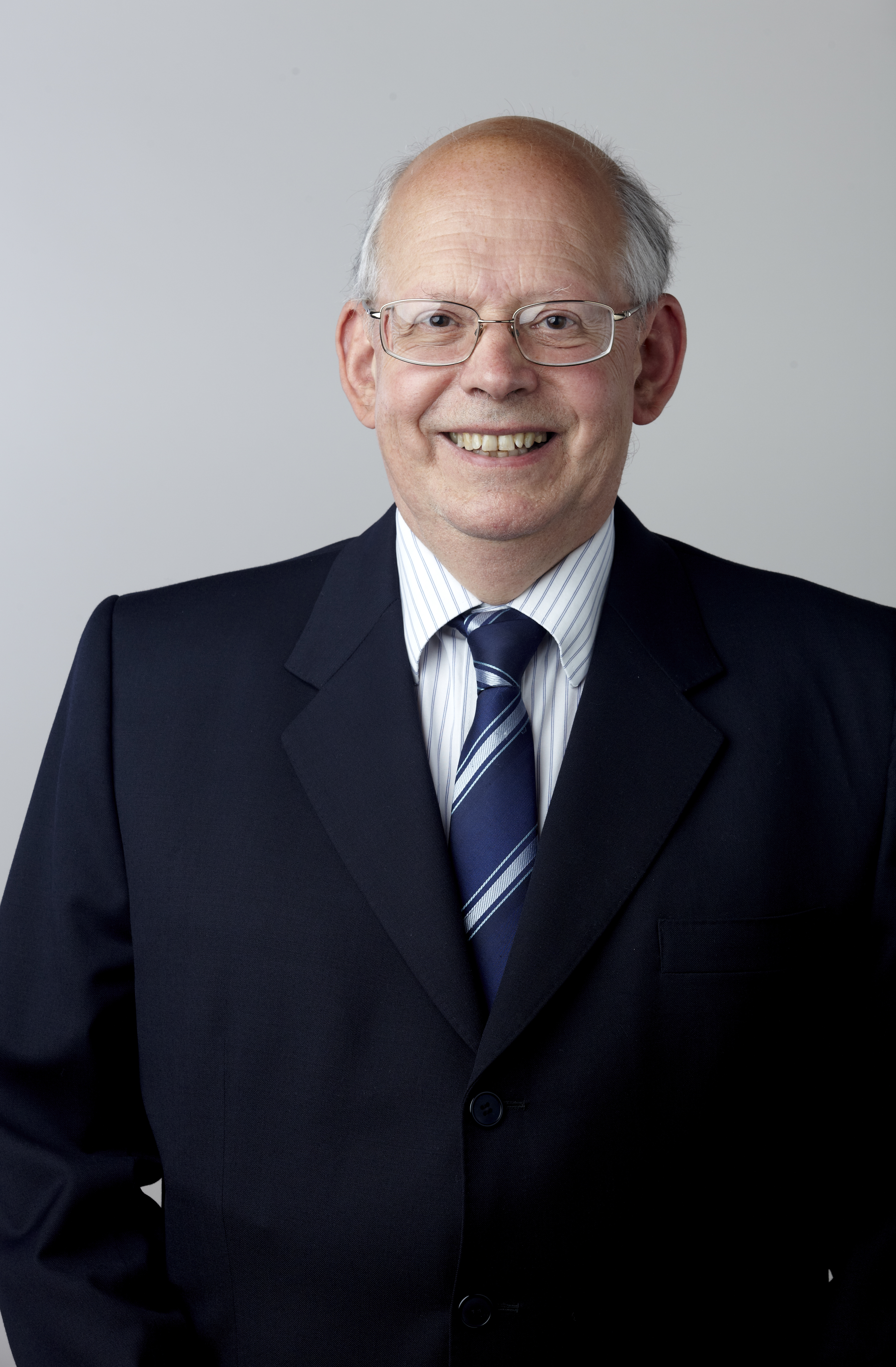
- Hills in 2014
- Born: Richard Edwin Hills; 30 September 1945; Farnborough, Hampshire, England
- Died: 5 June 2022 (aged 76); Cambridge, England
- Education: Bedford School; University of Cambridge (BA); University of California, Berkeley (PhD)
- Awards: Jackson-Gwilt Medal (1989)
- Scientific career
- Fields: Astronomy
- Workplaces: University of Cambridge
- Thesis: Interferometric Observations of Radio-Emission from Galactic Water Vapour (1973)
- Website: www.mrao.cam.ac.uk/people/rhills.html

Richard Edwin Hills (30 September 1945 – 5 June 2022) was a British astronomer who was emeritus professor of Radio Astronomy at the University of Cambridge.

== Early life and education ==
Richard Edwin Hills was born in Farnborough, Hampshire on 30 September 1945. He was educated at Bedford School, Hills studied the Natural Science Tripos at Queens' College, Cambridge and then went to the University of California, Berkeley to complete his Doctor of Philosophy degree.

== Career and research ==
Hills was a research scientist at the Max Planck Institute in Bonn between 1972 and 1974, before he returned to the University of Cambridge and became involved in the development of telescopes and instrumentation for astronomy at wavelengths of around one millimetre—the spectral region that lies between radio waves and infrared—which is relatively unexplored.

He worked as the project scientist for the James Clerk Maxwell Telescope during its design and construction, and went on to use the telescope to observe distant, redshifted quasars and the processes associated with star formation. In December 2007 he was appointed project scientist for the ALMA telescope, a sub-millimeter interferometer in the Atacama Desert of Northern Chile.

Hills was a fellow of St Edmund's College, Cambridge and Director of Studies for Natural Sciences at St Edmund's between 1990 and 2007. He was Professor of Radio Astronomy at the University of Cambridge between 1990 and 2007, Deputy Head of the Department of Physics at the University of Cambridge between 1999 and 2003, and was emeritus professor of Radio Astronomy at the University of Cambridge until his death on 5 June 2022.

== Death ==
Hills died from cancer in Cambridge, on 5 June 2022, aged 76.

== Awards and honours ==
Hills was awarded the Royal Astronomical Society's Jackson-Gwilt Medal in 1989, was part of the team given the MacRobert Award for Engineering in 1990 and was elected as a Fellow of the Royal Society (FRS) in 2014. His nomination for the Royal Society reads:

Since the early 1970s Richard Hills has played a leading role in the development of radio astronomy at millimetre wavelengths, an essential zone of the spectrum for the study of star formation in galaxies. As Project Scientist of the James Clerk Maxwell Telescope on Hawaii he was closely involved with the design and operation of this highly successful telescope. For his outstanding contribution to this project he was awarded the Jackson Gwilt Medal and Gift of the Royal Astronomical Society in 1989. From 2007 to 2012 he was Project Scientist of the Atacama Large Millimetre/Submillimetre Array (ALMA) in Chile. The first scheduled observations at 345 GHz using 16 of the planned 66 antennas took place in September 2011. These demonstrated the full angular resolution obtained by phase-coherent aperture synthesis which requires continuous monitoring of atmospheric absorption along the line of sight above each antenna. The outstanding scientific leadership shown by Richard Hills undoubtedly played a major part in the success of this challenging international project.
