= Kate Blackwell (barrister) =

British barrister

Kate Blackwell KC
- Born: 5 October 1969 (age 56); Manchester, United Kingdom
- Education: Loreto Grammar School Altrincham; University of Birmingham; Inns of Court School of Law
- Occupation: Barrister
- Years active: 1992–present

Kate Blackwell KC (born 5 October 1969) is a British barrister at Lincoln House Chambers, Manchester and 2 Hare Court, London. She became a Crown Court Recorder in 2009, a King's Counsel (then Queen's Counsel) in 2012 and Head of Chambers at Lincoln House Chambers in 2023.

== Public Inquiries ==
Called to the bar in 1992, Blackwell was a junior counsel in the team conducting the prosecution of the British serial killer Harold Shipman. She was later appointed to The Shipman Inquiry chaired by Dame Janet Smith in 2000.

Blackwell was appointed as counsel to the Daniel Morgan Independent Panel commissioned by the Home Office in 2014 and chaired by Baroness O'Loan, to address questions relating to police involvement in the unsolved murder of Daniel Morgan, the role played by police corruption and the incidence of corrupt connections between private investigators, the London Metropolitan Police and journalists at the News of the World.

Blackwell was appointed as the expert legal adviser to the Gosport Independent Panel in 2015 to investigate historic concerns about the initial care of older people at Gosport War Memorial Hospital and the subsequent investigations into their deaths. The Panel found that, during the relevant period, the lives of over 450 patients were shortened by clinically inappropriate use of opioid analgesics, with an additional 200 lives also likely to have been shortened if missing medical records are taken into account.

Blackwell was instructed to represent NHS England in the Manchester Arena Bombing Inquiry set up to investigate the deaths of the 22 victims of the 2017 Manchester terror attack at the city's Arena.

Blackwell provided legal advice to the review team conducting the Baroness Casey Review into the standards of behaviour and internal culture of the Metropolitan Police Service. The review considered whether the leadership, recruitment, vetting, training, culture and communications supported the standards that the public should expect. It found that the organisation was institutionally racist, misogynistic and homophobic.

Blackwell acted as Leading Counsel representing Serco in the Brook House Public Inquiry, established to investigate the decision, actions and circumstances surrounding the mistreatment of individuals detained at Brook House Immigration Removal Centre in 2017. The scandal had been exposed in a BBC Panorama programme.

In 2022, Blackwell was appointed as Counsel to the Inquiry for the UK COVID-19 Inquiry. She led the first module into the state of pandemic preparedness of the United Kingdom with Hugo Keith KC. During Module 1, Blackwell examined former Prime Minister David Cameron and former Chancellor George Osborne She has returned to the Inquiry to lead the final module with Shaheen Rahman KC. Module 10 is examining the impact of COVID-19 on the population of the United Kingdom with a particular focus on mental health and wellbeing, key workers, the most vulnerable and the bereaved. It is investigating the impact of the pandemic and the measures put in place to combat the disease. The public hearings are due to take place in February 2026.

In the autumn of 2023, Blackwell was instructed to represent the former executives of the Countess of Chester Hospital at the Thirlwall Inquiry set up to investigate the circumstances in which Lucy Letby was able to murder and cause harm to several neonatal babies following her convictions the same year. Letby’s case was highlighted by Rachel Aviv in the New York Times in an article which questioned her guilt. During the course of the Thirlwall Inquiry public hearings, Letby made an application to the Criminal Case Review Commission to have her case referred back to the Court of Appeal (England and Wales) having lost two appeals. Blackwell applied to pause the Inquiry pending the CCRC’s consideration of Letby’s case. The application was refused and the Inquiry is due to publish its report in November 2025.

== Criminal Law ==
In addition to her inquiry work, Blackwell specialises in all areas of English criminal law.

Blackwell was "vilified" by the media in 2013 when a complainant in a rape case died by suicide a week after cross-examination by her in court. The trial judge described Blackwell's behaviour as "perfectly proper and correct in her examination of all the witnesses in this case".

In 2016, Blackwell was lead barrister for the successful prosecution of former Sunderland footballer Adam Johnson at Bradford Crown Court. On 28 February 2017, Blackwell appeared at the Court of Appeal to respond on behalf of the Crown to an application by Johnson for permission to appeal his conviction and sentence. After hearing argument from both sides, the Court, presided over by Lady Justice Rafferty, reserved judgement. On 16 March 2017, the Court of Appeal refused leave for Johnson to appeal his conviction and sentence. Blackwell was described by The Guardian as a ‘no-nonsense prosecutor’.

== Reviews ==
At the Manchester Legal Awards 2017 ceremony, Blackwell won the 'Barrister of the Year' award.

In December 2017 Blackwell was appointed as a Master of the Bench at Lincoln's Inn. She was presented by Lord Justice McCombe and published by the Treasurer, Lord Neuberger.

Blackwell was awarded 'Barrister of the Year' for the second time at the 10th Anniversary Manchester Legal Awards on 7 March 2019.

She was The Times 'Lawyer of the Week’ on 24 June 2021.

Blackwell appears as a leading lawyer in the legal directories The Legal 500 and Chambers and Partners.

== Personal life ==
Blackwell was born on 5 October 1969 in Manchester. She was educated at St Vincent's Catholic Primary School, Altrincham and Loreto Grammar School, Altrincham (1981–88). Blackwell completed five seasons with the National Youth Theatre performing in T.S. Eliot's Murder in the Cathedral at the Edinburgh Festival and at the Moscow Arts Theatre in 1989 with Katy Carmichael and Daniel Craig. Blackwell then studied Law at the University of Birmingham (1989–92) and subsequently went to the Inns of Court School of Law in London where she completed the Bar Vocational Course.

Blackwell lives in Manchester and London and has four children.
