= Anna Moore =

Australian astronomer

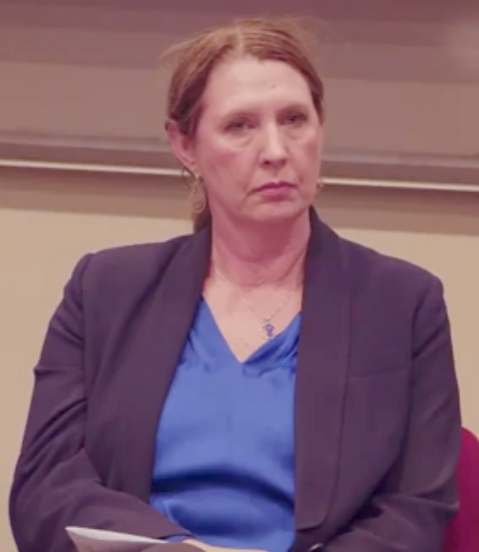
- At a panel discussion at the Australian National University in 2023
- Education: Cambridge University; University of London; University of Sydney
- Occupations: Director, ANU Institute for Space
- Employer: Australian National University
- Known for: Space exploration
- Title: Professor
- Website: https://inspace.anu.edu.au/

Anna Marie Moore is an Australian astronomer who was involved in the formation of the Australian Space Agency as part of the expert reference group of the Australian Government. She was nominated as a fellow of the Australian Academy of Technological Sciences and Engineering in 2023 for her contributions to space exploration. She is Director of The Australian National University Institute for Space and the Advanced Instrumentation Technology Centre.

== Education ==
Moore was awarded a BA from Cambridge University, 1994, a Masters of Space Sciences from the University of London, 1995, and a PhD in astronomy from the University of Sydney, 2000.

== Career ==
Moore was employed at the Arcetri Observatory from 2004 to 2005, California Institute of Technology from 2005 to 2017, and the Australian National University from 2017 onwards. She has received funding from various sources including the National Science Foundation, for SGER: United States participation in the 2007 Traverse to Dome A- Optical Sky Brightness and Ground Layer Turbulence Profiling. Moore also has received funding from the NSF for Gattini-UV South Pole camera research and the Australian Research Council for research on the Kunlun Infrared Sky Survey.

At the Australian National University, she was director of Mount Stromlo’s Advanced Instrumentation and Technology Centre (AITC) from 2017 - 2021. During her tenure as Director of AITC, Moore played a role in broadening the scope of space testing services for the aerospace sector in both Australia and New Zealand. She also ensured access for the space community to the AITC's National Space Test Facility (NSTF).

Moore established and is Director of the Australian National University Institute for Space (InSpace). As InSpace Director, Moore has exceeded normal diversity benchmarks by cultivating a workforce that is 75% women in an industry that is traditionally male-dominated. Her initiatives have facilitated the inclusion of female researchers within the InSpace Mission Specialist team and Technical Advisory Groups, two bodies that influence Australia's overarching space strategy.

By early 2020, during the COVID-induced closures affecting much of Australian business, Moore facilitated the reopening of NSTF's first facility at ANU. This ensured the continual fulfilment of heightened space testing demands from space companies, start-ups, and universities across Australia.

== Select publications ==
Moore has authored over 100 peer-reviewed publications, with over 3060 citations and an H index of 29 as of 2023. Moore has also written various articles on space for The Conversation, on 'Why space matters' and space exploration in a post-covid world.

- P Morrissey, M Matuszewski, DC Martin, JD Neill, H Epps, J Fucik, et al. (2018). The keck cosmic web imager integral field spectrograph. The Astrophysical Journal 864 (1), 93. DOI 10.3847/1538-4357/aad597
- DC Martin, D Chang, M Matuszewski, P Morrissey, S Rahman, A Moore, et al. (2014). Intergalactic medium emission observations with the Cosmic Web Imager. I. The circum-QSO medium of QSO 1549+ 19, and evidence for a filamentary gas inflow. The Astrophysical Journal 786 (2), 106
- JE Larkin, AM Moore, SA Wright, JE Wincentsen, D Anderson, et al. (2016) The infrared imaging spectrograph (IRIS) for TMT: instrument overview. Ground-based and Airborne Instrumentation for Astronomy VI 9908, 582–594
- M. Kimura, T. Maihara, F Iwamuro, M Akiyama, N Tamura, GB Dalton, N Takato, P Tait, K Ohta, S Eto, D Mochida, B Elms, K Kawate, T Kurakami, Y Moritani, J Noumaru, N Ohshima, M Sumiyoshi, K Yabe, J Brzeski, T Farrell, G Frost, P R. Gillingham, R Haynes, A M. Moore, et al., Fibre Multi-Object Spectrograph (FMOS) for the Subaru Telescope, Publications of the Astronomical Society of Japan, Volume 62, Issue 5, 25 October 2010, Pages 1135–1147, https://doi.org/10.1093/pasj/62.5.1135.
- Roger Haynes, Anna Moore, Celine D'Orgeville, et al. "Through fires, smoke, hail, austerities and COVID-19: The successful operation of the ANU’s Advanced Instrumentation Technology Centre (AITC).", Proc. SPIE 12187, Modeling, Systems Engineering, and Project Management for Astronomy X, 121870P (29 Aug 2022); https://doi.org/10.1117/12.2630599.

== Awards ==
- 2025 – Australian Space Awards University of the Year
- 2025 – Royal Astronomical Society’s (RAS) Jackson-Gwilt Medal, recognising outstanding invention, improvement, or development of astronomical or geophysical instrumentation or techniques.
- 2024 – ANU Vice Chancellor’s Clare Burton Award for Excellence in Diversity, Equity & Inclusion
- 2024 – ANU Vice Chancellor’s Award for Distinguished Contribution to the University for leadership in Australian space research
- 2024 – American Chamber of Commerce in Australia Alliance Awards – Space Leader
- 2024 – Australian Space Awards Executive of the Year
- 2023 – Australian Space Awards Academic Institute of the Year
- 2023 – Fellowship of the Australian Academy of Technological Sciences and Engineering
- 2022 – Australian Space AwardsResearch Organisation of the Year
- 2021 – Australian Space Awards Female Leader of the Year
- Australian Financial Review’s Top 100 Innovators
- Northcote Graduate Scholarship for Doctoral Studies
