= Jonathan Grounds =

English footballer (born 1988)

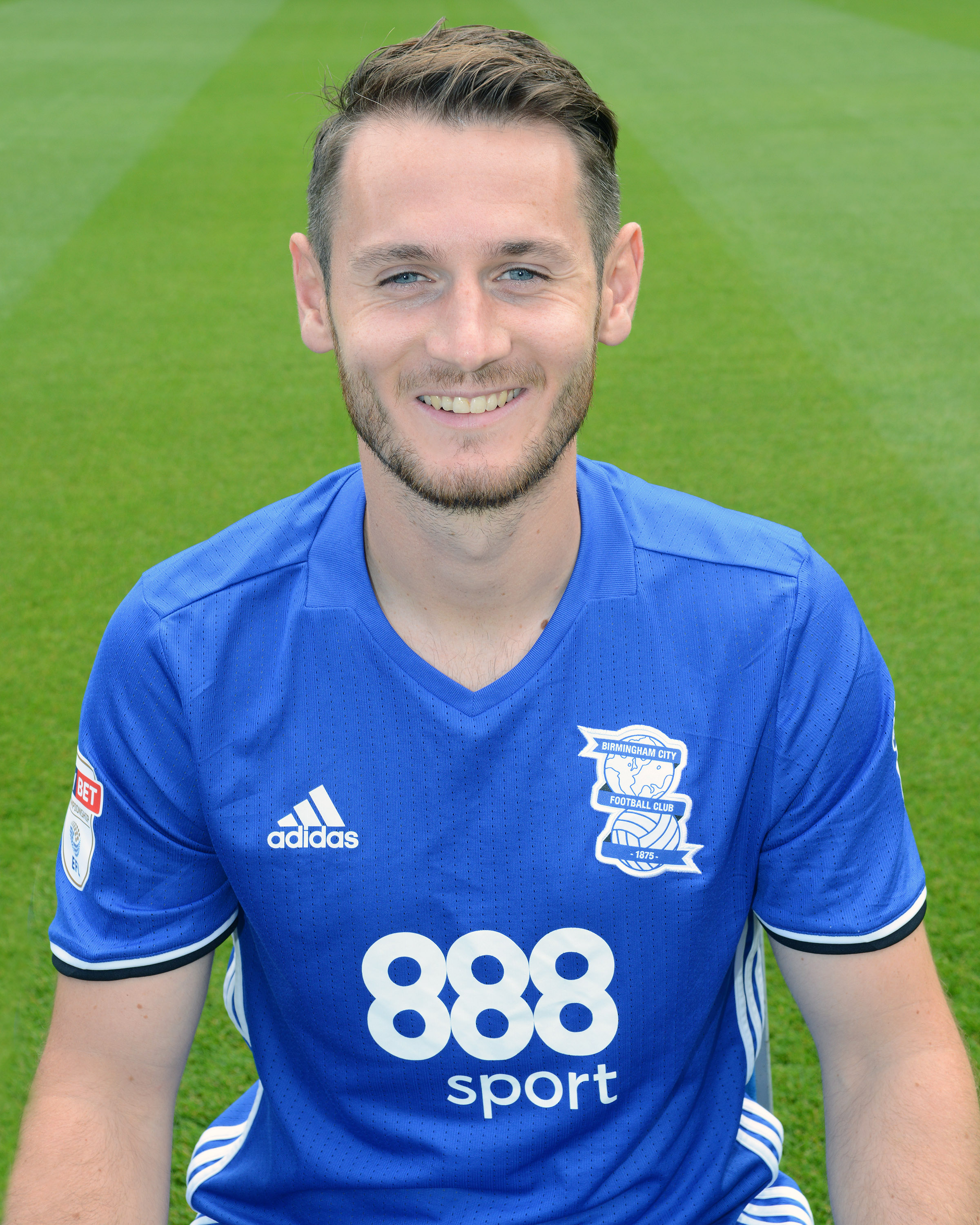
- Grounds in Birmingham City kit, 2016

Personal information
- Full name: Jonathan Martin Grounds
- Date of birth: 2 February 1988 (age 38)
- Place of birth: Thornaby-on-Tees, England
- Height: 6 ft 1 in (1.85 m)
- Positions: Left back; centre back

Team information
- Current team: Birmingham City (men's first team development coach)

Youth career
- 1995–2007: Middlesbrough
- Redcar Town

Senior career*
Years	Team	Apps	(Gls)
2007–2012	Middlesbrough	33	(1)
2008	→ Norwich City (loan)	5	(0)
2009	→ Norwich City (loan)	11	(3)
2010–2011	→ Hibernian (loan)	13	(0)
2011	→ Chesterfield (loan)	13	(0)
2012	→ Yeovil Town (loan)	14	(0)
2012–2014	Oldham Athletic	89	(3)
2014–2020	Birmingham City	158	(4)
2018–2019	→ Bolton Wanderers (loan)	13	(0)
2020–2021	Swindon Town	31	(0)
2021–2023	Exeter City	33	(3)
Total		413	(14)
- * Club domestic league appearances and goals

Jonathan Martin Grounds (born 2 February 1988) is an English football coach and former professional player who played as a left back or centre back.

Grounds began his career with his local club, Middlesbrough, but never became a regular member of the first team; he made 33 league appearances spread across five years. He also spent time on loan to Norwich City of the Championship, twice, Scottish Premier League club Hibernian, and Chesterfield and Yeovil Town, both of League One. He left Middlesbrough in 2012 and signed for Oldham Athletic, also of League One, on a free transfer. After two seasons with Oldham, he signed for Birmingham City, where he was a first-team regular for four seasons before spending the 2018–19 season on loan at Bolton Wanderers. He was released by Birmingham in 2020, and spent the 2020–21 season with Swindon Town before finishing his playing career with two seasons at Exeter City.

Grounds joined Birmingham City's coaching staff in 2024.

== Life and playing career ==
=== Early life and career ===
Grounds was born in Thornaby-on-Tees, North Yorkshire. He was associated with Middlesbrough F.C. from the age of eight, had a season ticket "from a very early age", and also played football for Stockton Schools and Redcar Town. In July 2003, Grounds was a member of the Middlesbrough youth team that played in the inaugural Nike Premier Cup in the United States. He took up a two-year scholarship with Middlesbrough F.C.'s Academy in 2004, and as part of the programme, he continued his education at Middlesbrough College where he achieved a sports science qualification. Grounds has been with long term partner Savannah since 2008 and welcomed a son in March 2012. The couple were married in June 2017.

=== Middlesbrough and loans ===
Prior to the 2007–08 season, the club had considered releasing him, but decided to give him his first professional contract, of one year. With regular left backs Andrew Taylor and Emanuel Pogatetz injured, Grounds made his first-team debut on 12 January 2008 in a 1–1 Premier League draw at home to Liverpool. After impressing both as captain of Middlesbrough's reserve team and in further appearances for the first team, he was rewarded with a new two-year contract in March. According to manager Gareth Southgate, "We didn't expect him to progress this quickly but he got into the first team and did very well, showing he has the right character and the mentality to cope with the big occasion."

Grounds joined Championship club Norwich City on 1 September 2008 on loan for three months. He was recalled by Middlesbrough after just 31 days and five appearances because of a player shortage at his parent club. He helped them keep a clean sheet in his first match back, away to Wigan Athletic in the Premier League, and hoped that would boost his chances of retaining a place. His only other appearance came two weeks later at home to Chelsea. Covering for Justin Hoyte in an unfamiliar right-back role, his "last-ditch block" prevented a first-half goal, but in the second half he was fortunate that Florent Malouda failed to capitalise on his error, and he was substituted after 54 minutes with his team 3–0 down. On 7 January 2009, Grounds rejoined Norwich, this time for two months. He spent much of this stint at Norwich playing in central defence while Jason Shackell was unavailable, and he made a further eleven appearances for them, scoring three goals, before returning to his parent club. He made no appearances in what remained of Middlesbrough's season, but was an unused substitute as their relegation to the Championship was confirmed.

Southgate selected Grounds to start the opening match of the new season. The team kept four consecutive clean sheets, and he continued in the side for several weeks, either at left back or, after the sale of Robert Huth, at centre back. The Evening Gazette suggested that "battling full-backs Tony McMahon and Jonathan Grounds, who both have some experience at this level and appear to have a more physical approach have been picked ahead of the more silky but at times suspect duo of Justin Hoyte and Andrew Taylor." He dropped to the bench before the last match in September, and played infrequently until late January, when an injury crisis caused Southgate's successor, Gordon Strachan, to bring him back into central defence. According to the Gazette, "Grounds made numerous headed clearances and interceptions during the game and could hardly have done any more to push himself back into Strachan's thoughts." He stayed in the team for another month, and finished the season with 20 Championship appearances.

In June 2010, Grounds extended his Middlesbrough contract for a further two years. He made one League Cup appearance early in the 2010–11 season, when 13 senior professionals were unavailable through injury or international duty, and was then loaned to Scottish Premier League club Hibernian until 30 January 2011 so that he could play regularly at first-team level. He went straight into the starting eleven for Hibernian's next match, a 1–1 draw at home to Inverness Caledonian Thistle, and opened the scoring in a League Cup match against Kilmarnock that Hibernian lost 3–1, continuing a string of poor results that culminated in the departure of manager John Hughes. Grounds was dropped by the caretaker managers, and omitted for the first match under Colin Calderwood, but returned to the team thereafter and played regularly until the turn of the year. Although Hibernian wanted to extend the loan, no agreement could be reached, and Grounds returned to Middlesbrough two weeks early, having made 15 appearances in all competitions. Under new manager Tony Mowbray, Grounds played six matches for Middlesbrough after his return, including a 4–3 defeat at home to Swansea City in which he scored a headed goal; he partnered the equally inexperienced Seb Hines in central defence.

At the start of the 2011–12 season, after Taylor left the club, Joe Bennett was Middlesbrough's left back of choice. Although Bennett saw Grounds as competition, Mowbray spoke of Grounds "filling in" in that position, and did not view him as an out-and-out left back. On 25 August, he joined League One club Chesterfield on loan for a month, which was later extended to three months. He made 16 appearances in all competitions before returning to Middlesbrough.

By the turn of the year, Grounds was "on the outer fringes of the squad". He and team-mate Jonathan Franks joined Yeovil Town, also of League One, in February 2012 on an initial month's loan, which was later extended to the end of the season. He made 14 appearances – interrupted by a return home when his partner, Savannah, gave birth to their son – as Yeovil avoided relegation.

=== Oldham Athletic ===
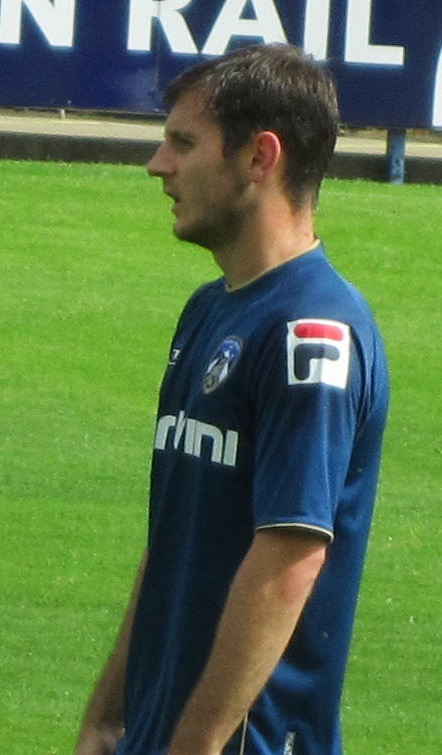
Grounds playing for Oldham Athletic in 2012

Grounds recognised that in order to play regularly he needed to leave Middlesbrough. His contract expired at the end of the season, and he turned down an offer of a permanent move to Yeovil, before signing a two-year deal with League One club Oldham Athletic. He made a mixed start to his Oldham career: he scored the winner against Manchester City in a pre-season friendly, but in the opening league fixture, Milton Keynes Dons' Daniel Powell "terrorised" him. He started every game but two – a league match in November through suspension for five yellow cards, and the final match of the season, having injured his neck in the previous fixture – and scored once, at home to Shrewsbury Town. Playing on the wing in place of the suspended Cristian Montaño, he touched home a parried cross for the only goal of the match. He was ever-present through Oldham's 2012–13 FA Cup run, in which they eliminated Nottingham Forest and Liverpool, drew with Everton in the fifth round through Matt Smith's stoppage-time header from Grounds's corner, before losing 3–1 in the replay.

He spent much of the 2013–14 season alternating between left back and centre back: he said he was comfortable in either role, having played in both positions throughout his career, and thought the difference in style between himself and the more attacking James Tarkowski helped their centre-back partnership work well. For the second season running, he missed only two matches: one through suspension, and the penultimate match of the campaign, when players were rested with the team finally safe from relegation. He made his 100th appearance for the club on 14 March 2014, and in the 106th and last appearance of his Oldham career, he conceded a penalty that gave opponents Notts County the draw they needed to avoid relegation. Although Oldham wanted to retain his services, he told them he intended to leave and had already had talks with other clubs.

=== Birmingham City ===
Lee Clark was assistant manager of Norwich City when Grounds played there on loan, and was reported as interested in signing him for Huddersfield Town the following season. Five years later, Grounds became Clark's first purchase of the 2014 summer transfer window for Championship club Birmingham City. He signed a two-year contract, to take effect on 1 July after his Oldham contract expired. He made his debut in the starting eleven for the opening-day defeat at Middlesbrough, and settled into the side as regular first choice at left back, both under Clark and, after his dismissal in November, under his successor, Gary Rowett.

With Birmingham 2–0 down against West Bromwich Albion in the FA Cup, Grounds steered Lloyd Dyer's low centre past the goalkeeper in first-half stoppage time for his first goal for the club; the game finished as a 2–1 defeat. His first league goal for Birmingham, a header from a corner to draw level with Blackburn Rovers on 14 April 2015, came three days after it should have done: against Wolverhampton Wanderers, his shot crossed the line unnoticed by the officials, was pushed back into play, and returned into goal by Rob Kiernan. He started every league match but one in the 2014–15 season, more than any other Birmingham outfielder, as the team finished in tenth place. According to the Birmingham Mail's Brian Dick, writing in his end-of-season review, Grounds "improved as the season developed", becoming "an increasingly confident and assured" member of the back four, "very effective in the air, pretty solid in defence but limited going forward".

Ahead of the 2015–16 season, Grounds' contract was extended to run until 2017. He continued as a regular in the starting eleven, missing only one league match because of a minor injury, as the team again finished tenth. The Birmingham Mail thought he needed to be more assertive when dealing with crosses, and the player himself, while admitting he had had "a few shaky games", felt more settled than he had in the past and was enjoying playing regularly. Going into the 2016–17 campaign, Rowett was actively seeking to bring in another left back as competition: when Rhoys Wiggins arrived on loan from AFC Bournemouth, BBC Radio WM's Richard Wilford wrote that he became "the first serious challenger to Jonathan Grounds at left-back in two years." Grounds retained his place for some weeks as the team went seven matches unbeaten and provided the assist for Che Adams's equalising goal away to Preston North End, but a fifth booking of the season in a defeat at Burton Albion earned him a one-match suspension and gave Wiggins his opportunity. He started the local derby against Aston Villa, produced what Rowett dubbed an "absolutely brilliant" performance until in stoppage time, he suffered a knee injury that ended his season.

Grounds returned in the next match and performed "commendably well" both in defence and in attack. Apart from three matches out following an injury, he still kept his place after Gianfranco Zola succeeded Rowett, whether at left back, centre back or wing back. He scored twice: in a 1–1 draw at Ipswich Town, when he followed up Lukas Jutkiewicz's parried shot, and in the penultimate fixture of the season, a 2–0 win at home to Huddersfield Town. After Zola's dismissal and the appointment of Harry Redknapp, Birmingham needed to win both their last two matches to avoid relegation; Grounds was a part of the defence that kept a clean sheet away to Bristol City in a 1–0 win that preserved their Championship status.

Birmingham took up their option to extend Grounds's contract for another year, and he continued in the first team until the close of the transfer window, when the defence was reshuffled to accommodate Emilio Nsue and new arrival Maxime Colin. Redknapp was sacked two games later, and caretaker manager Lee Carsley persisted with Nsue and Colin – both right-sided players – at full back. As soon as Steve Cotterill was appointed manager, Grounds was recalled. He kept his place as the team's form and results improved, and his contribution was recognised with a contract extension until 2020. The team produced a run of five wins, two draws and only one defeat from the end of December onwards, but in the fifth of those wins, Grounds suffered a medial ligament injury that was initially thought might keep him out for the rest of the season. He made a speedy recovery, came back into the matchday squad on 3 April, and returned to the pitch to start the visit to Wolverhampton Wanderers 12 days later, but that was his final appearance of the season.

==== Bolton Wanderers (loan) ====
Monk decided that Grounds was one of several senior players who did not form part of his plans for the 2018–19 season in light of the club's issues with the EFL's profitability and sustainability rules. He had no pre-season training with the first team and was not given a squad number, and the only summer recruit for whom a fee was paid was another left back, Kristian Pedersen. On 13 August, Grounds joined another Championship club, Bolton Wanderers, on loan for the season. He came into the first team rather sooner than anticipated after Andy Taylor suffered a calf injury, and had six weeks in the starting eleven despite what manager Phil Parkinson and his staff admitted was insufficient preparation and lack of match fitness. Thereafter he came into the side infrequently, and finished the season with 15 appearances in all competitions as the team were relegated with the club in severe financial difficulty. He made his first appearance for three months in Bolton's final match of the season, in which Parkinson struggled to raise a team as several players had cancelled their contracts because they had not been paid and others were unwilling to risk injury that might jeopardise a move elsewhere.

==== Return to Birmingham ====
Grounds was a member of Birmingham's first-team squad for the 2019–20 season, but was never part of the matchday selection. He was released when his contract expired at the end of June 2020, after six years and 170 appearances.

=== Swindon Town ===
Grounds signed a one-year contract with League One club Swindon Town on 17 September 2020. He made his debut on 26 September, as a late substitute in a 4–2 league win at home to Burton Albion, and injuries at centre-back meant that despite his lack of match fitness, he soon found himself in the starting eleven. He started well, but errors against Plymouth Argyle and in the FA Cup against non-league club Darlington cost his team, and by 24 November he had enough yellow cards for a suspension. Grounds played regularly until a calf injury at the end of December kept him out for a couple of months, and finished the season with 33 appearances in all competitions (and 12 yellow cards) as Swindon were relegated. According to the Swindon Advertiser, his communication and organisational ability compensated for a lack of pace.

At the end of the season, the club triggered extensions to his and Brett Pitman's contracts, but after staff were not paid their wages for June, neither he nor Pitman turned up to pre-season training. On 23 July 2021 Grounds' contract was cancelled by mutual consent.

=== Exeter City ===
On 26 July 2021 Grounds signed for League Two club Exeter City. He made his debut in the starting eleven for the opening fixture of the season, a goalless draw at home to Bradford City, and was sent off for receiving a second yellow card towards the end of the next league game, a 3–0 defeat away to Leyton Orient. He finished the season with 15 league appearances as Exeter gained promotion as runners-up, and was the only out-of-contract player to be offered a new deal at the higher level; he accepted another one-year contract, but turned down the offer of a player-coach role in 2023.

== Coaching career ==
Grounds returned to Birmingham City as an academy coach in 2024. He worked with the under-16s and as assistant to under-21s manager Steve Spooner before being promoted to Chris Davies's staff as first team development coach in October 2024.

== Career statistics ==
Appearances and goals by club, season and competition
Club	Season	League			National cup (Note: Appearances in FA Cup and Scottish Cup)		League cup (Note: Appearances in Football League Cup/EFL Cup and Scottish League Cup)		Other		Total	
Club	Season	Division	Apps	Goals	Apps	Goals	Apps	Goals	Apps	Goals	Apps	Goals
Middlesbrough	2007–08	Premier League	5	0	2	0	0	0	—		7	0
Middlesbrough	2008–09	Premier League	2	0	0	0	1	0	—		3	0
Middlesbrough	2009–10	Championship	20	0	0	0	0	0	—		20	0
Middlesbrough	2010–11	Championship	6	1	—		1	0	—		7	1
Middlesbrough	2011–12	Championship	0	0	—		0	0	—		0	0
Middlesbrough	Total		33	1	2	0	2	0	—		37	1
Norwich City (loan)	2008–09	Championship	16	3	—		—		—		16	3
Hibernian (loan)	2010–11	Scottish Premier League	13	0	1	0	1	1	—		15	1
Chesterfield (loan)	2011–12	League One	13	0	1	0	—		2 (Note: Appearance(s) in Football League Trophy)	0	16	0
Yeovil Town (loan)	2011–12	League One	14	0	—		—		—		14	0
Oldham Athletic	2012–13	League One	44	1	6	0	1	0	1	0	52	1
Oldham Athletic	2013–14	League One	45	2	4	0	1	0	4	0	54	2
Oldham Athletic	Total		89	3	10	0	2	0	5	0	106	3
Birmingham City	2014–15	Championship	45	1	1	1	1	0	—		47	2
Birmingham City	2015–16	Championship	45	1	1	0	2	0	—		48	1
Birmingham City	2016–17	Championship	42	2	2	0	1	0	—		45	2
Birmingham City	2017–18	Championship	26	0	2	0	2	0	—		30	0
Birmingham City	2018–19	Championship	0	0	—		—		—		0	0
Birmingham City	2019–20	Championship	0	0	0	0	0	0	—		0	0
Birmingham City	Total		158	4	6	1	6	0	—		170	5
Bolton Wanderers (loan)	2018–19	Championship	13	0	1	0	1	0	—		15	0
Swindon Town	2020–21	League One	31	0	1	0	—		1 (Note: Appearance(s) in EFL Trophy)	0	33	0
Exeter City	2021–22	League Two	15	2	3	0	1	0	3	0	22	2
Exeter City	2022–23	League One	18	1	1	0	2	0	1	0	22	1
Exeter City	Total		33	3	4	0	3	0	4	0	44	3
Career total			413	14	26	1	15	1	12	0	466	16

== Honours ==
Exeter City

- League Two runner-up: 2021–22
