= Newspapers in Education =

Newspapers in Education (NiE) is a programme designed to help teachers teach children about newspapers, how they work, and how to use them. National programmes exist in more than 80 countries according to research by the World Association of Newspapers and News Publishers (WAN-IFRA)[.

== New Zealand ==
One example is New Zealand, where many individual newspapers had an NiE programme but these no longer exist.

- The Forum of Fargo-Moorhead
- Taranaki Daily News
- The Dominion Post
- Manawatu Evening Standard
- The Marlborough Express
- The Nelson Mail
- The Press
- The Star
- The Timaru Herald
- The Southland Times
- The Sunday Star-Times
- Waikato Times

There were different 'levels' of activity papers-one for each curriculum level:

- Go Zone Junior (Year 1–2)
- Go Zone (Year 3–4)
- i-Site (Year 5–6)
- NewsLinks (Year 7–8)
- Zoned In (Year 9–10)

== United Kingdom ==
The Gazette Media Centre, a modern educational facility that was part of the Gazette Media Company in Middlesbrough, was part of Newspapers in Education.

== USA ==
- "Newspapers In Education". nieworld.com. Archived from the original on 4 February 1998.
- Parente, Audrey (November 30, 2003). "Mystery Solved: Search for photographer who captured famed Depression-era image leads to Ormond Beach family". The Daytona Beach News-Journal. Florida. Archived from the original on May 7, 2006. "Newspapers in Education: Florida Quest"

== Taiwan ==
- 國語日報 Mandarin Daily News is a professional newspaper in Taiwan dedicated to promoting Mandarin and popularizing education.
- The ANNE Times, is a Taiwanese educational newspaper published as part of the Ministry of Education's Curriculum Reform Initiative Taskforce Agenda for Art and Design Education. (AADE) Designed as a teaching resource for schools, it integrates aesthetic education, reading literacy, and interdisciplinary learning through news-based content for classroom use.
