= Andrew Taylor (footballer, born 1986) =

English footballer

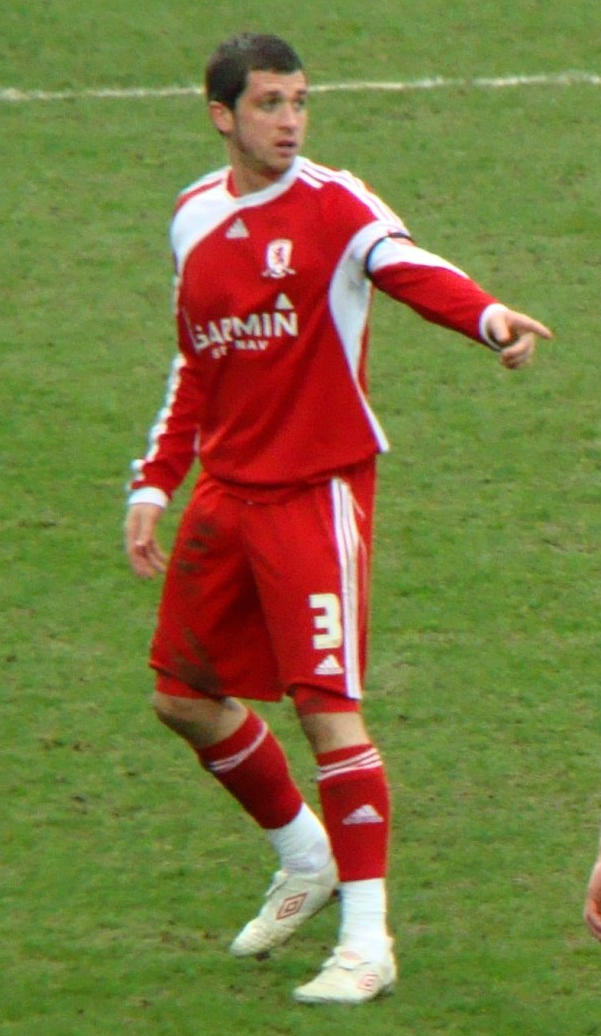
- Taylor playing for Middlesbrough in 2009

Personal information
- Full name: Andrew Derek Taylor
- Date of birth: 1 August 1986 (age 40)
- Place of birth: Hartlepool, England
- Height: 5 ft 10 in (1.78 m)
- Positions: Left back; left midfielder

Team information
- Current team: Leeds United (Loan Manager)

Youth career
- –2004: Middlesbrough

Senior career*
| Years | Team | Apps | (Gls) |
| 2004–2011 | Middlesbrough | 125 | (3) |
| 2005–2006 | → Bradford City (loan) | 24 | (0) |
| 2010–2011 | → Watford (loan) | 19 | (1) |
| 2011–2014 | Cardiff City | 103 | (1) |
| 2014–2017 | Wigan Athletic | 26 | (1) |
| 2015–2016 | → Reading (loan) | 19 | (0) |
| 2016–2017 | → Bolton Wanderers (loan) | 34 | (0) |
| 2017–2019 | Bolton Wanderers | 46 | (0) |
| Total | | 396 | (6) |

International career
| | England U16 | 4 | (0) |
| 2002–2003 | England U17 | 6 | (0) |
| 2004 | England U18 | 3 | (0) |
| 2004–2005 | England U19 | 10 | (0) |
| 2005 | England U20 | 1 | (0) |
| 2006–2009 | England U21 | 13 | (0) |

Managerial career
- 2020: Sunderland (caretaker)
Medal record
Men's football
Representing England
UEFA European Under-21 Championship
| Runner-up | 2009 Sweden |
- * Club domestic league appearances and goals

Andrew Derek Taylor (born 1 August 1986) is an English former professional footballer who last played for Bolton Wanderers. He has previously played for Cardiff City, Middlesbrough, Bradford City, Watford and Wigan Athletic.

== Club career ==
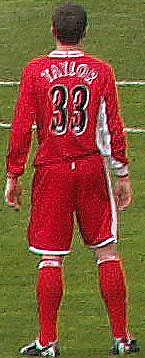
Taylor (wearing 33 number shirt) pictured in his early Middlesbrough's career.

Born in Hartlepool, County Durham, Taylor began his football career at Middlesbrough's youth academy, first joining at age nine. He eventually progressed through the youth ranks as schoolboy, trainee and senior professional before signing his first professional terms upon turning seventeen. Taylor started out as a left midfielder in the successful 2004 FA Youth Cup campaign with the likes of David Wheater and Adam Johnson. On 12 March 2005, he signed his first professional contract with the club.

=== Middlesbrough ===
Taylor was named as a substitute in several UEFA Cup games during the 2004–05 season but did not leave the bench. However, he was plagued with ankle injury that affected most of the 2004–05 season.

With only Franck Queudrue able to play at left-back, Steve McClaren brought Taylor back from Bradford City the following 2005–06 season, where he had impressed on loan. Taylor made his Middlesbrough debut, starting a match and playing 61 minutes before being substituted, in a 7–0 loss against Arsenal on 14 January 2006. A month later on 23 February 2006. He made his UEFA Cup debut against VfB Stuttgart in the second round of the Round of 32, in a 1–0 loss, but saw the club through to the next round on away goal. Since making his debut for the club, he found himself in and out of the starting line–up for the rest of the 2005–06 season. During the 2005–06 season, Boro reached the FA Cup semi-final and the 2006 UEFA Cup Final. Taylor played in several Premier League matches and the FA Cup semi-final to save Queudrue for the UEFA Cup tie with Sevilla. His impressive form meant he was unlucky to miss out on a starting place against Sevilla. At the end of the 2005–06 season, he made twenty appearances in all competitions.

Ahead of the 2006–07 season, newly appointed Manager Gareth Southgate revealed the club was in talks with Taylor over a new contract. However, the arrival of Julio Arca for the 2006–07 season in replacement of the Fulham-bound Queudrue saw Taylor lose his place. After Arca's injury during the first game of the season against Reading, Taylor made his first appearance of the 2006–07 season, starting the whole game, in a 2–1 win against Chelsea. Taylor started in the next seven matches before being dropped from the squad for the next two matches. However, he returned to the starting line–up against West Ham United on 11 November 2006, helping the side keep a clean sheet, in a 1–0 win. Since returning, Taylor deputised in the left back position and continued to do even Arca returned from injury, which he eventually moved to playing in the central midfielder position and eventually made it his own after impressing Manager Gareth Southgate, as well as, stuck a partnership with fellow Boro academy graduate Stewart Downing on the left wing. His first team run ins earned him praise from Colin Cooper, saying: "He's better than me at the same age." Despite suffering from injuries later the 2006–07 season, Taylor made forty–one appearances in all competitions.

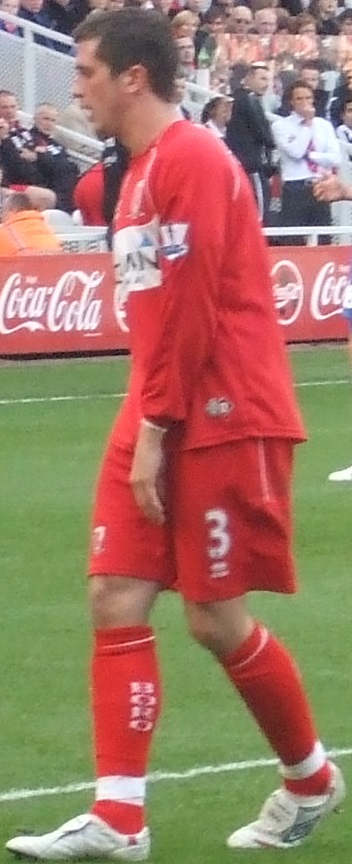
Taylor pictured playing for Middlesbrough during the 2008–09 season.

At the start of the 2007–08 season, Taylor continued to establish himself in the starting eleven, playing in the left–back position. He then set up the club's first goal of the game for Wheater, in a 2–0 win against Birmingham City on 1 September 2007. Since the start of the 2007–08 season, Taylor started in every match for the side until he suffered a foot injury during a 0–0 draw against Bolton Wanderers on 11 November 2007 and was sidelined for four months. While on the sidelines, Taylor signed a one-year extension to his contract in January 2008, which would see him remain at the club until June 2011. On 15 March 2008, he made his return from injury against Arsenal, coming on as a 68th-minute substitute, in a 1–1 draw. Taylor then started in a follow–up match, in a 1–0 win against Derby County. At the end of the 2007–08 season, he made twenty–one appearances in all competitions.

Ahead of the 2008–09 season, Taylor switched number shirt from number thirty–three to three. At the start of the 2008–09 season, he appeared in the first six matches, making four starts for the side. During a 2–1 win against Stoke City on 30 August 2008, Taylor suffered an injury in the 19th minute and was substituted as a result. But he made a quick recovery and played in the midfield position after coming on as 70th minute for Didier Digard, in a 2–1 loss against Portsmouth on 13 September 2008. However, Taylor suffered an injury that saw him miss one match. But he made his return to the starting eleven, in a 5–0 loss against Chelsea on 18 October 2008. Since returning from injury, Taylor regained his first team place for the next eight matches. During a 3–1 loss against Bolton Wanderers on 22 November 2008, Taylor found himself in an altercation with a fan and apologised soon after. This lasted until he suffered a knee injury that saw him miss one match. Taylor returned to the first team from injury, coming on as a late substitute, in a 2–0 loss against Fulham on 20 December 2008. Since returning from injury, however, Taylor lost his first team place to Emanuel Pogatetz and spent months on the sidelines, though he appeared in the first team on two occasions. It was not until 4 March 2009, when Taylor returned to the first team, coming on as a second-half substitute, in a 4–0 loss against Tottenham Hotspur. Despite receiving playing time since returning from injury, he ended the season on a low note as Boro were relegated after playing out a draw at home to Aston Villa. The 2008–09 season proved to be a frustrating one for Taylor as he played only 20 league games (28 in all competitions) due to several injuries.

After starting the 2009–10 season on the bench, Taylor reclaimed his spot in the starting eleven for the next four matches. Towards the end of August, he was linked with a move to Blackburn Rovers as a replacement for Stephen Warnock but ended up staying at Middlesbrough. However, on 12 September 2009, Taylor sustained an ankle ligament injury in the 41st minute and was substituted, as home side won 3–1 against Ipswich Town and was out for the rest of the month and October. By early–November, he made his return from injury and started in a number of matches for the reserve side. Taylor made the bench for the 21 November 2009 game against Nottingham Forest but did not leave the bench. He continued to spend the next two months on the substitute bench and the reserve side, as well as, facing his own injury concern. On 26 January 2010, Taylor made his first team appearances in months, coming on as a late substitute, in a 4–1 win against Doncaster Rovers. Despite returning to the first team, he continued to feature in and out of the starting line–up for the rest of the 2009–10 season. At the end of the 2009–10 season, Taylor made thirteen appearances in all competitions.

Despite being included in Middlesbrough's squad in the pre–season ahead of the 2010–11 season, Taylor continued to remain out of the club's starting line–up. By the time he left the club, Taylor made one appearance, coming on a 78th-minute substitute, in a 1–0 win against Sheffield United on 22 August 2010. After returning to Middlesbrough in January, he returned to the starting line–up, in a 4–0 win against Bristol City on 15 January 2011. Under new 'Boro boss, Tony Mowbray, Taylor returned to the first team as a left winger. On 19 March 2011, he scored his first Middlesbrough goal against former side Watford, 'Boro won the game 2–1. Taylor later scored two more goals for Middlesbrough against Ipswich Town and Burnley. Despite missing one match, due to a groin injury, he made twenty appearances and scoring three times in all competitions.

At the end of 2010–11 season, Taylor's contract was due to run out and was linked with a move to Cardiff City, where he could re-join former Watford boss Malky Mackay. Another Championship club, Bristol City were also interested in signing Taylor over the summer.

==== Loan Spells from Middlesbrough ====
On 6 July 2005, Taylor was sent out on loan to Bradford City, making his full debut at his hometown club Hartlepool United in the opening game of the season. Since making his debut for the club, he quickly established himself in the starting eleven, playing in the left–back position. Despite missing two matches, Taylor made twenty–six appearances in all and returned to his parent club on 4 January 2006.

Taylor joined Watford on loan on 31 August 2010. He made his Watford debut on 10 September 2010 against Doncaster Rovers, starting the whole game, in a 2–2 draw. Since making his Watford debut, Taylor quickly became a first team regular for the side, playing in the left–back position. He scored his first career goal—a stunning left footed volley from outside the penalty area—on 1 January 2011, in a 3–0 win against Portsmouth at Vicarage Road. His loan spell finished on 5 January, and on 17 January, Watford put in a bid for the left back. However, a move failed to materialise. By the time he departed from the club, he made nineteen appearances and scoring once in all competitions.

=== Cardiff City ===
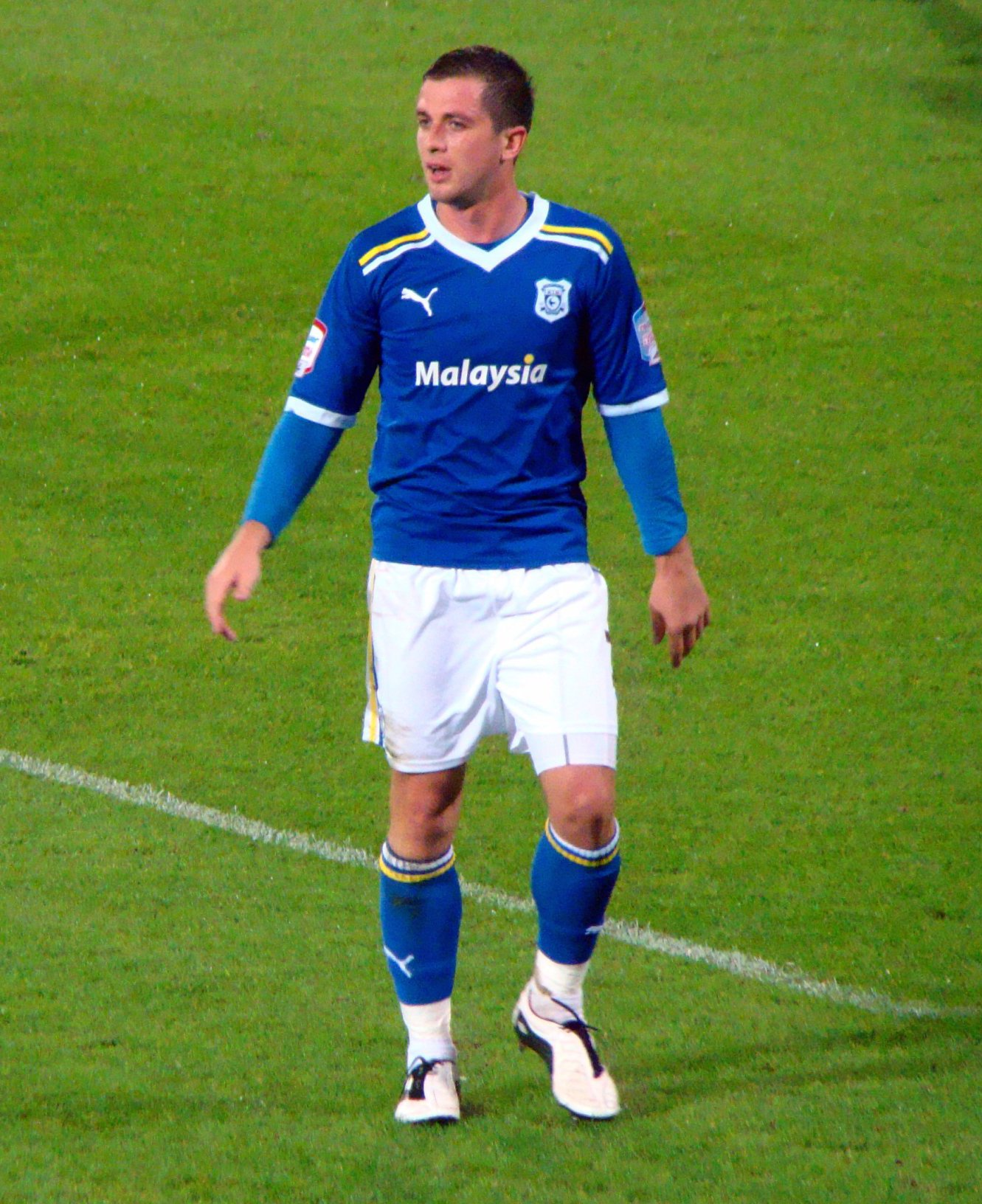
Andrew Taylor playing for Cardiff City in 2011.

On 1 July 2011, Taylor agreed terms with Cardiff City, signing a three-year deal with the Welsh club. Upon joining the club, he said: "Signing for Cardiff City is the right football decision for me. I am from the north east, but, looking in at Cardiff City before I signed, it was clear this is a massive club with a big fan base." Taylor was also given a number three shirt ahead of the 2011–12 season. In doing so, Taylor took a pay cut to join Cardiff City.

Taylor made his debut for Cardiff City, starting the whole game, in 1–0 win over West Ham United on the opening day of the season. He then scored his first goal for Cardiff on 27 August, in a 1–1 draw with Portsmouth at Fratton Park. Since making his debut for Cardiff City, Taylor immediately became the club's first-choice left-back for the next seven matches. However, he suffered a hamstring injury that saw him miss three matches. On 15 October 2011, Taylor returned to the starting line–up against Ipswich Town, in a 2–2 draw. He then set up two goals in the next two matches against Peterborough United and Barnsley. Taylor continued to regain his first team place in the left–back position for the next eight matches before missing one match at the beginning of December. He then made his return to the first team on 10 December 2011, in a 1–1 draw against Millwall. Taylor continued to regain his first team place in the left–back position for the rest of the season. Manager Malky Mackay praised his performance, calling him a "good professional". Taylor played in all eight games in the club's League Cup push, and represented City in the Wembley Final against Liverpool. Cardiff were beaten by the Premier League side after a penalty shootout, the game finishing 2–2 after extra time as Cardiff won many plaudits for their performance against an established Premier League side. However, the club's form in the league dipped following the cup final, and they ultimately finished the season in sixth position. West Ham United, who went on to win promotion, beat City home and away in their Play-off semi-final meetings. At the end of the 2011–12 season, he went on to make fifty–two appearances and scoring once in all competitions.

At the start of the 2012–13 season, Taylor continued to regain his first team place in the left–back position. He signed a two-year contract extension on 16 November 2012, tying him to the club until 2016. Taylor started in every match since the start of the 2012–13 season until he suffered a calf injury and was substituted in the 26th minute, in a 1–0 win against Middlesbrough on 17 November 2012. After being sidelined throughout November, Taylor made his return to the starting line–up, helping Cardiff City keep a clean sheet, in a 1–0 win against Sheffield Wednesday on 1 December 2012. He then started for the next five matches before missing one match, due to illness. Taylor returned to the starting line–up, helping Cardiff City keep a clean sheet, in a 0–0 draw against Ipswich Town on 12 January 2013. He then set up three goals in three matches between 5 March 2013 and 16 March 2013 against Derby County, Leicester City and Sheffield Wednesday. However, in the last game of the season against Hull City, Taylor was sent–off for a second bookable offence in stoppage time, as they drew 2–2. Despite this, he made forty-three league appearances in his second season in Wales, the third-highest total of any Cardiff player, and was an integral part of the side that won the 2012–13 Championship title, achieving promotion to the Premier League.

After serving the opening game of the season, Taylor made his first appearance of the 2013–14 season, starting the whole game, in a 3–2 win against Manchester City on 25 August 2013. Since the start of the 2013–14 season, he started in the left–back position for the next eleven matches for the side. However, Taylor suffered a calf strain that saw him miss two matches. On 14 December 2013, he returned to the starting line–up, in a 1–0 win against West Bromwich Albion. However, Taylor suffered a calf injury for the second time that kept him out for two months. On 22 February 2014, he returned to the starting line–up, in a 4–0 loss against Hull City. Following this, Taylor lost his first team place in the left–back position to Declan John and Fábio. But he made his return to the first team, starting the whole game, in a 3–3 draw against West Bromwich Albion on 29 March 2014. At the end of the 2013–14 season, which saw the club relegated to the Championship after one season at the Premier League, Taylor made nineteen appearances in all competitions.

=== Wigan Athletic ===
On 3 June 2014, Taylor signed for Wigan Athletic on a three-year deal.

Taylor made his Wigan Athletic debut in the opening game of the season, starting the whole game, in a 2–2 draw against Reading. Since making his debut, he quickly established himself in the starting eleven, playing in the left–back position. Taylor played an important role against Blackpool on 23 August 2014 when he set up the only goal for Oriol Riera in a 1–0 victory at the DW Stadium. This was followed up by scoring his first goal for the club, in a 4–0 win against Birmingham City on 30 August 2014. On 22 November 2014, he made his return to the starting line–up, in a 1–1 draw against Middlesbrough. Taylor regained his first team place in the left–back for the next three months before losing his first team place to Gaëtan Bong for the rest of the season. However, Wigan's relegation from the Championship was confirmed on 28 April 2015. At the end of the 2014–15 season, Taylor made twenty–seven appearances and scoring once in all competitions.

==== Reading (loan) ====
On 5 August 2015, Taylor signed on loan to Reading for a season-long loan deal. Upon joining the club, he was given a number three shirt.

Taylor made his Reading debut, starting the whole game and playing 120 minutes, in a 1–0 win against Colchester United in the first leg of the League Cup. A week later on 19 August 2015, he made his league debut for the club, starting the match and playing 76 minutes before being substituted, in a 1–1 draw against Sheffield Wednesday. However, Taylor found himself out of the starting line–up, as he found himself on the substitute bench, as well as, his own injury concern. After a month away from the first team, Taylor made his first appearance for the side, starting the whole game, in a 1–0 win against Rotherham United. From that moment on, he spent the rest of the season, competing with Jordan Obita over the left–back position. Along the way, Taylor also faced being on the sidelines, due to injuries. After spending away from the first team for a month, he started in a match against Huddersfield Town on 8 March 2016, setting up the club's only goal of the game, in a 3–1. At the end of the 2015–16 season, Taylor made twenty–three appearances in all competitions and returned to his parent club shortly after.

=== Bolton Wanderers ===
On 10 August 2016, Taylor signed on loan for Bolton Wanderers.

He made his Bolton Wanderers debut three days later away at AFC Wimbledon as an 85th-minute substitute, replacing Liam Trotter. In the first two months to the season, Taylor found himself in a competition with Dean Moxey, which saw him placed on the substitute bench. But in early–October, he won his place in the first team and established himself in the starting eleven, playing in the left–back position. He then helped the club keep four consecutive clean sheets between 8 October 2016 and 24 October 2016. A month later, Taylor helped Bolton Wanderers keep another four consecutive clean sheets between 19 November 2016 and 12 December 2016. This lasted until he suffered a groin injury while warming up prior to a match against Milton Keynes Dons on 4 February 2017. After missing one match, Taylor made his return to the starting line–up in the left–midfield position against Walsall on 11 February 2017 and helped the club win 4–1. His return was short–lived when he suffered a hamstring injury during a match against Rochdale and was substituted at half time on 14 February 2017. After being sidelined for a week, Taylor made his return to the starting line–up, playing in the left–back position, in a 1–1 draw against Bristol Rovers on 28 February 2017. Following this, he began to play in the left–midfield position for the next six matches. However, Taylor suffered a calf injury during a 2–0 win against Shrewsbury Town on 25 March 2017 and the injury saw him miss four matches. But he made his return to the starting line–up against Bury on 18 April 2017, playing in the left–midfield position, in a 0–0 draw. In the last game of the season against Peterborough United, Taylor helped Bolton Wanderers end the season on a high note with a 3–0 win which was enough to seal promotion back to the Championship at the first attempt as runners up. At the end of the 2016–17 season, he went on to make forty appearances in all competitions. Following this, Taylor returned to his parent club.

On 25 May 2017, Taylor signed for Bolton Wanderers on a permanent basis, signing a two-year deal after being released by Wigan Athletic. Taylor's first game after signing for the club on a permanent basis came in the opening game of the season, in a 3–2 loss against Leeds United. He started in the next four matches, playing once in the left–back position and three times in the left–midfield position. However, Taylor suffered a calf injury that kept him out for weeks. He then made his return from injury, starting a match in the centre–back position against West Ham United on 19 September 2017 in the third round of the League Cup, losing 3–0. However, Taylor suffered a back injury during a 1–1 draw against Fulham on 28 October 2017 and was sidelined for a month as a result. On 23 December 2017, he returned to the starting line–up, in a 2–0 win against Cardiff City. However, his return was short–lived when Taylor suffered an injury during a 2–0 loss against his former club, Middlesbrough on 26 December 2017. Upon returning to the first team from injury, he lost his first team place to Antonee Robinson and was placed on the substitute bench. Taylor had to wait for two months to make his first team return, playing in the left–midfield position, in a 2–0 win against Sunderland on 20 February 2018. Following this, he and Robinson competed in the left–back position for the rest of the 2017–18 season. At times, Taylor appeared in the starting line–up, where he captained the side on two occasions, which were against Leeds United and Birmingham City on 30 March 2018 and 3 April 2018 respectively. At the end of the 2017–18 season, Taylor made twenty–one appearances in all competitions. He was also named the season's PFA Community Champion.

At the start of the 2018–19 season, Taylor started in the next four league matches in the left–back position and made a good start to the season, winning three out of the four league matches. However, during a 2–2 draw against Preston North End on 1 September 2018, he suffered a calf injury and was sidelined for a month. After recovering from injury, Taylor returned to the starting line–up and played 75 minutes before being substituted, in a 3–0 loss against Nottingham Forest on 24 October 2018. Since returning to the first team, he regained his place in the left–back position despite competing with Jonathan Grounds for the rest of the year. During a 2–1 win against Rotherham United on 26 December 2018, Taylor suffered a calf injury after playing 67 minutes and had to be substituted and was sidelined for three weeks. He then returned to the starting line–up against West Bromwich Albion on 21 January 2019 and captained the side for the first time this season after his teammate Wheater was placed on the substitute bench. However, Taylor suffered a calf injury that saw him out for a month. On 9 March 2019, he returned to the starting line–up and appeared as captain for the second time this season, in a 2–1 win against Millwall. Taylor went on to captain the side on two more occasions. However, Bolton Wanderers was relegated to League One in a severe financial difficulty. He spoke out the situation on the club's financial problems on two separate occasions. However, Lion of Vienna Suite criticised Taylor, saying: "Really poor throughout the season and as PFA rep can be held largely responsible for the end of season strike which forever tarred this squad as being some of the most weak-willed footballers we have ever had the misfortune to see pull on the white shirt." At the end of the 2018–19 season, Taylor made twenty–seven appearances in all competitions.

Following his release by the club, Taylor, again, spoke out in an interview about the club's financial problems, saying he hadn't been paid since February. He was linked with a move to his hometown club, Hartlepool United and was keen on the move Instead, Taylor announced his retirement from professional football on 7 September 2019.

== Post Playing career ==
Following his retirement from professional football, Taylor joined Sunderland as a first team coach, under the management of Phil Parkinson. He took temporary charge of Sunderland after Parkinson's sacking on 29 November 2020, ahead of a league game against Burton Albion. After the appointment of Lee Johnson, Taylor continued to remain in the club's backroom staff under the new management. However, he left Sunderland to join Leeds United as the new loan manager.

== International career ==
Having previously played for the Under-16 level, Taylor has been in the youth setup since the Under-17 level, and played at the 2003 UEFA U17 Championships with U21 teammates Mark Noble, Steven Taylor and James Milner.

With England qualified for the FIFA World Youth Championship in the United Arab Emirates that year, Taylor was again selected in the squad and played one out of the three group games as England were eliminated in last place.

In October 2004, Taylor was called up to the England U19 for the first time and made his debut in 1–1 draw against Czech Republic U19. He was a part of England's Under-19 at the 2005 European Championships, in which they finished runners-up to France.

In February 2006, Taylor was called up to the England U21 squad for the first time and made his debut for the U21 side, coming on a 65th-minute substitute, in a 2–1 win against Norway U21. He made his first start for the U21 side a year later on 6 February 2007, in a 2–2 draw against Spain U21. Between 7 September 2007 and 16 October 2007, Taylor started and helped the U21 side keep four clean sheets. Two years later in the summer of 2009, he was called up for the 2009 UEFA U21 Championship in Sweden and finished runners-up to Germany.

== Personal life ==
Taylor said that football was his lifetime ambition growing up and said in the same interview that his childhood hero was Paul Gascoigne and Paul Ince. While progressing through the Middlesbrough's academy, he spent three years at college, studying BTEC National Diploma in Sports Science and passed the course. His father, Kevin, worked for the under-15 coach at Middlesbrough. Taylor is married to his wife, Jay, and together, they have two children Mason and Preston.

On 20 May 2010, Taylor was arrested by police for being drunk and disorderly at a popular nightspot outside Loons bar in the town's Lucan Street and fined £80. After announcing his retirement from professional football, Taylor returned to living in native North-east. He previously studied his masters in sport directorship at the University of Salford and stayed there for a year, with his next plan once his football career is over.

=== Business interests ===
In August 2009 it was announced that the footballer would be involved in a new business venture called Platinum Players. The website based service is aimed to connect footballers and other celebrities with companies and trades people whose reputability and trustworthiness has been validated. The site is available by invitation-only, and went live on 1 September 2009.

== Career statistics ==
As of match played 5 May 2019

Appearances and goals by club, season and competition
| Club | Season | League | | | FA Cup | | League Cup | | Other | | Total | |
| Club | Season | Division | Apps | Goals | Apps | Goals | Apps | Goals | Apps | Goals | Apps | Goals |
|---|---|---|---|---|---|---|---|---|---|---|---|---|
| Middlesbrough | 2005–06 | Premier League | 13 | 0 | 4 | 0 | 0 | 0 | 3 (Note: Appearances in UEFA Cup) | 0 | 20 | 0 |
| Middlesbrough | 2006–07 | Premier League | 34 | 0 | 7 | 0 | 1 | 0 | — | | 42 | 0 |
| Middlesbrough | 2007–08 | Premier League | 19 | 0 | 0 | 0 | 2 | 0 | — | | 21 | 0 |
| Middlesbrough | 2008–09 | Premier League | 26 | 0 | 1 | 0 | 1 | 0 | — | | 28 | 0 |
| Middlesbrough | 2009–10 | Championship | 12 | 0 | 0 | 0 | 1 | 0 | — | | 13 | 0 |
| Middlesbrough | 2010–11 | Championship | 21 | 3 | 0 | 0 | 0 | 0 | — | | 21 | 3 |
| Middlesbrough | Total | | 125 | 3 | 12 | 0 | 5 | 0 | 3 | 0 | 145 | 3 |
| Bradford City (loan) | 2005–06 | League One | 24 | 0 | 0 | 0 | 0 | 0 | 2 (Note: Appearances in Football League Trophy) | 0 | 26 | 0 |
| Watford (loan) | 2010–11 | Championship | 19 | 1 | 0 | 0 | 0 | 0 | — | | 19 | 1 |
| Cardiff City | 2011–12 | Championship | 42 | 1 | 0 | 0 | 8 | 0 | 2 (Note: Appearances in Championship play-offs) | 0 | 52 | 1 |
| Cardiff City | 2012–13 | Championship | 43 | 0 | 0 | 0 | 0 | 0 | — | | 43 | 0 |
| Cardiff City | 2013–14 | Premier League | 18 | 0 | 1 | 0 | 0 | 0 | — | | 19 | 0 |
| Cardiff City | Total | | 103 | 1 | 1 | 0 | 8 | 0 | 2 | 0 | 114 | 1 |
| Wigan Athletic | 2014–15 | Championship | 26 | 1 | 1 | 0 | 0 | 0 | — | | 27 | 1 |
| Reading (loan) | 2015–16 | Championship | 19 | 0 | 2 | 0 | 2 | 0 | — | | 23 | 0 |
| Bolton Wanderers (loan) | 2016–17 | League One | 34 | 0 | 4 | 0 | 0 | 0 | 2 (Note: Appearances in EFL Trophy) | 0 | 40 | 0 |
| Bolton Wanderers | 2017–18 | Championship | 20 | 0 | 0 | 0 | 1 | 0 | — | | 21 | 0 |
| Bolton Wanderers | 2018–19 | Championship | 26 | 0 | 0 | 0 | 1 | 0 | — | | 27 | 0 |
| Career total | | | 396 | 6 | 20 | 0 | 17 | 0 | 9 | 0 | 442 | 6 |

== Honours ==
Cardiff City

- Football League Championship: 2012–13
- Football League Cup runner-up: 2011–12

Bolton Wanderers

- EFL League One runner-up: 2016–17
