= Gazette Media Centre =

Former educational facility in England

The Gazette Media Centre was a modern educational facility which was part of the Gazette Media Company in Middlesbrough, England.

The Gazette Media Centre used to house two ICT Suites and provide media-related training to various groups (mainly schools). It was officially opened on 26 July 2002 by Tony and Cherie Blair.

One of the main activities that was run by the Gazette Media Centre is its 'contract newspapers'. Schools or other groups could attend the Centre to produce their own school or community newspaper, including having multiple copies (usually in the thousands) printed and distributed. These were often used by schools and colleges in the local area as a good marketing tool, or to keep parents and students updated on school or college news.

The Gazette Media Centre was a part of what is often referred to as 'NIE' - Newspapers in Education. The Centre used to work closely with a similar centre 'The Newsroom', which is located in Newcastle upon Tyne (linked to the Newcastle Journal and Evening Chronicle).

Teesside University now own the Gazette Building and adjoining Gazette Media Building.
