= 2010–11 Middlesbrough F.C. season =

Middlesbrough
2010–11 season
- Chairman: Steve Gibson
- Manager: Gordon Strachan (until 18 October); Tony Mowbray (from 26 October)
- Championship: 12th
- FA Cup: Third round
- League Cup: Second round
- Top goalscorer: Leroy Lita; Scott McDonald (12 each)
Home colours	Away colours

The 2010–11 season was Middlesbrough second consecutive season in the Championship. The club captain is Matthew Bates, with Tony Mowbray as manager. Mark Venus was appointed assistant manager. Former manager Gordon Strachan resigned on 18 October 2010 by mutual consent, following a string of poor results. Mowbray was appointed on 26 October 2010.

== Season review ==
=== Championship ===
==== League table ====
Pos	Team	Pld	W	D	L	GF	GA	GD	Pts
10	Leicester City	46	19	10	17	76	71	+5	67
11	Hull City	46	16	17	13	52	51	+1	65
12	Middlesbrough	46	17	11	18	68	68	0	62
13	Ipswich Town	46	18	8	20	62	68	−6	62
14	Watford	46	16	13	17	77	71	+6	61

Updated to match(es) played on 7 May 2011. Source: The Football League
Rules for classification: 1) points; 2) goal difference; 3) number of goals scored.

==== Results summary ====
Overall								Home						Away					
Pld	W	D	L	GF	GA	GD	Pts	W	D	L	GF	GA	GD	W	D	L	GF	GA	GD
46	17	11	18	68	68	0	62	10	7	6	37	32	+5	7	4	12	31	36	−5

Source: []

==== Result round by round ====
Round	1	2	3	4	5	6	7	8	9	10	11	12	13	14	15	16	17	18	19	20	21	22	23	24	25	26	27	28	29	30	31	32	33	34	35	36	37	38	39	40	41	42	43	44	45	46
Ground	H	A	H	A	A	H	H	A	A	H	H	A	A	H	H	A	A	H	H	A	H	A	A	A	H	A	H	H	A	H	A	H	H	A	H	A	H	H	A	A	H	A	A	H	A	H
Result	L	D	W	L	L	W	W	L	L	D	L	L	L	L	W	W	L	L	D	L	W	L	W	D	D	W	D	W	L	L	W	L	D	L	W	D	W	D	W	D	D	L	W	W	W	W
Position	19	19	10	16	20	17	13	17	19	18	20	21	23	23	19	19	21	22	23	23	21	21	21	20	20	19	20	18	19	20	19	21	20	20	20	20	18	18	17	18	18	18	17	15	14	12

A = Away; H = Home; W = Win; D = Draw; L = Loss

=== Championship results ===
Win Draw Loss

Note: Results are given with Middlesbrough score listed first. Man of the Match is according to mfc.co.uk.

Game	Date	Venue	Opponent	Result F–A	Attendance	Boro Goalscorers	Man of the Match
1	7 August 2010	H	Ipswich Town	1–3	21,882	McDonald 22'	Coyne
2	14 August 2010	A	Leicester City	0–0	21,587		Steele
3	22 August 2010	H	Sheffield United	1–0	14,633	Boyd 52'	Arca
4	28 August 2010	A	Barnsley	0–2	11,767		Not awarded
5	11 September 2010	A	QPR	0–3	14,784		Steele
6	14 September 2010	H	Burnley	2–1	15,033	Kink (2) 79', 90'+4	Kink
7	18 September 2010	H	Reading	3–1	15,158	Robson 1', Lita 41', Wheater 68'	Lita
8	25 September 2010	A	Watford	1–3	12,185	Mariappa (o.g.) 80'	McDonald
9	28 September 2010	A	Derby County	1–3	24,739	Boyd 20'	Wheater
10	2 October 2010	H	Portsmouth	2–2	14,749	Bates 29', Robson 42' (pen.)	O'Neil
11	16 October 2010	H	Leeds United	1–2	23,550	Boyd 53'	Wheater
12	19 October 2010	A	Nottingham Forest	0–1	22,115		McMahon
13	23 October 2010	A	Norwich City	0–1	25,410		McManus
14	30 October 2010	H	Bristol City	1–2	19,039	Boyd 30'	L. Williams
15	6 November 2010	H	Crystal Palace	2–1	15,400	Kink 76', McCarthy (o.g.) 85'	McMahon
16	9 November 2010	A	Scunthorpe United	2–0	5,475	Boyd 6', McDonald 23'	Steele
17	14 November 2010	A	Swansea City	0–1	14,906		Wheater
18	20 November 2010	H	Millwall	0–1	15,697		Bates
19	27 November 2010	H	Hull City	2–2	15,075	Lita 29', McDonald 46'	Robson
20	4 December 2010	A	Coventry City	0–1	15,768		Emnes
21	11 December 2010	H	Cardiff City	1–0	14,250	Arca 40' (pen.)	Hines
22	17 December 2010	A	Doncaster Rovers	1–2	9,543	McDonald 4'	Thomson
23	28 December 2010	A	Preston North End	3–1	11,946	Lita (2) 30', 59', Wheater 61'	Lita
24	1 January 2011	A	Leeds United	1–1	30,452	Wheater 20'	Wheater
25	3 January 2011	H	Norwich City	1–1	16,853	R. Martin (o.g.) 21'	Bailey
26	15 January 2011	A	Bristol City	4–0	13,699	Cissé (o.g.) 43', Lita (2) 58', 90' (pen.), Robson 77'	Lita
27	22 January 2011	H	Preston North End	1–1	16,157	Bates 71'	Bailey
28	1 February 2011	H	Scunthorpe United	2–0	14,364	Boyd 8', McMahon 69'	McMahon
29	5 February 2011	A	Crystal Palace	0–1	14,060		Arca
30	12 February 2011	H	Swansea City	3–4	14,825	Emnes 8', Grounds 34', Lita 53'	Arca
31	19 February 2011	A	Millwall	3–2	11,871	McMahon 58', McDonald 62', Lita 83'	Zemmama
32	26 February 2011	H	QPR	0–3	16,972		Not awarded
33	1 March 2011	H	Nottingham Forest	1–1	15,341	McDonald 51'	Hines
34	5 March 2011	A	Reading	2–5	18,568	Lita (2) 29', 72' (pen.)	Ripley
35	8 March 2011	H	Derby County	2–1	13,712	Hines 73', Zemmama 88'	Hines
36	12 March 2011	A	Portsmouth	0–0	16,447		R. Williams
37	19 March 2011	H	Watford	2–1	16,090	McDonald 33', Taylor 45'	Bennett
38	2 April 2011	H	Leicester City	3–3	16,010	Emnes 14', R. Williams 55', McManus 90'+4	R. Williams
39	9 April 2011	A	Sheffield United	2–1	21,572	Bates 18', Emnes 89'	McManus
40	12 April 2011	A	Ipswich Town	3–3	17,286	Halliday 42', McDonald 43', Taylor 51'	Halliday
41	16 April 2011	H	Barnsley	1–1	16,107	McDonald 84'	Smith
42	19 April 2011	A	Burnley	1–3	21,882	Taylor 81'	Bates
43	23 April 2011	A	Hull City	4–2	21,937	McDonald (3) 11', 13', 45', Arca 26'	McDonald
44	25 April 2011	H	Coventry City	2–1	15,817	Arca 25', Kink 90'+2	Robson
45	2 May 2011	A	Cardiff City	3–0	25,183	Lita 3', Robson 13', Smallwood 21'	Robson
46	7 May 2011	H	Doncaster Rovers	3–0	19,978	Robson 43', Lita 66', Reach 90'+3	Emnes

== League Cup results ==
Round	Date	Venue	Opponent	Result F–A	Attendance	Boro Goalscorers	Man of the Match
1	10 August 2010	A	Chesterfield	2–1	6,509	McDonald 8', Arca 33'	Steele
2	24 August 2010	A	Millwall	1–2	6,704	McDonald 89'	Steele

== FA Cup results ==
Round	Date	Venue	Opponent	Result F–A	Attendance	Boro Goalscorers	Man of the Match
3	8 January 2011	A	Burton Albion		5,236	O'Neil 58'	Arca

== Squad ==
The squad numbers for 2010–11 were announced on 2 August 2010. Note: Flags indicate national team as defined under FIFA eligibility rules; some limited exceptions apply. Players may hold more than one non-FIFA nationality.

No.	Pos.	Nation	Player
2	DF	ENG	Justin Hoyte
3	DF	GER	Maximilian Haas
4	DF	ENG	Matthew Bates (captain)
5	MF	MAR	Merouane Zemmama
6	DF	SCO	Stephen McManus
7	FW	AUS	Scott McDonald
8	MF	SCO	Kevin Thomson
9	FW	SCO	Kris Boyd (on loan to Nottingham Forest)
10	MF	ENG	Nicky Bailey
11	FW	EST	Tarmo Kink
12	DF	ENG	Andrew Davies (on loan from Stoke City)
13	GK	ENG	Paul Smith (on loan from Nottingham Forest)
14	MF	IRL	Willo Flood
15	FW	ENG	Leroy Lita
16	FW	SCO	Lee Miller (on loan to Scunthorpe United)
17	MF	SCO	Barry Robson (vice-captain)
19	MF	SCO	Andy Halliday
20	MF	ARG	Julio Arca

No.	Pos.	Nation	Player
21	GK	WAL	Danny Coyne
22	FW	ENG	Luke Williams
23	DF	ENG	Jonathan Grounds
24	DF	ENG	Seb Hines
25	DF	AUS	Rhys Williams
26	DF	ENG	Andrew Taylor
27	DF	ENG	Joe Bennett
28	FW	ENG	Jonathan Franks
29	DF	ENG	Anthony McMahon
30	GK	ENG	Jason Steele
32	MF	NED	Marvin Emnes
33	MF	ENG	Richard Smallwood
34	DF	ENG	Ben Gibson
35	MF	ANG	Bruno Pilatos
37	MF	SEN	Mickaël Tavares (on loan from Hamburg)
38	MF	ENG	Cameron Park
39	GK	ENG	Connor Ripley
41	DF	ENG	Adam Reach

=== Statistics ===
No.	Pos	Nat	Player	Total		Championship		FA Cup		League Cup	
No.	Pos	Nat	Player	Apps	Goals	Apps	Goals	Apps	Goals	Apps	Goals
2	DF	(England) ENG	Justin Hoyte	19	0	16	0	1	0	2	0
3	DF	(Germany) GER	Maximilian Haas	2	0	2	0	0	0	0	0
4	DF	(England) ENG	Matthew Bates	32	3	31	3	1	0	0	0
5	DF	(England) ENG	David Wheater*	26	3	24	3	0	0	2	0
5	MF	(Morocco) MAR	Merouane Zemmama	9	1	9	1	0	0	0	0
6	DF	(Scotland) SCO	Stephen McManus	24	1	23	1	0	0	1	0
7	FW	(Australia) AUS	Scott McDonald	39	14	37	12	0	0	2	2
8	MF	(Scotland) SCO	Kevin Thomson	18	0	18	0	0	0	0	0
9	FW	(Scotland) SCO	Kris Boyd	29	6	27	6	1	0	1	0
10	MF	(England) ENG	Nicky Bailey	37	0	34	0	1	0	2	0
11	FW	(Estonia) EST	Tarmo Kink	21	4	20	4	0	0	1	0
12	DF	(England) ENG	Andrew Davies	6	0	6	0	0	0	0	0
13	GK	(England) ENG	Paul Smith	10	0	10	0	0	0	0	0
14	MF	(Republic of Ireland) IRL	Willo Flood	5	0	5	0	0	0	0	0
15	FW	(England) ENG	Leroy Lita	40	12	37	12	1	0	2	0
16	FW	(Scotland) SCO	Lee Miller	2	0	1	0	0	0	1	0
17	MF	(Scotland) SCO	Barry Robson	32	5	31	5	0	0	1	0
18	MF	(England) ENG	Gary O'Neil*	19	1	18	0	1	1	0	0
19	MF	(Scotland) SCO	Andrew Halliday	13	1	12	1	0	0	1	0
20	MF	(Argentina) ARG	Julio Arca	34	4	31	3	1	0	2	1
21	GK	(Wales) WAL	Danny Coyne	2	0	1	0	1	0	0	0
22	FW	(England) ENG	Luke Williams	7	0	6	0	0	0	1	0
23	DF	(England) ENG	Jonathan Grounds	7	2	6	1	0	0	1	1
24	DF	(England) ENG	Seb Hines	17	1	15	1	1	0	1	0
25	DF	(Australia) AUS	Rhys Williams	11	1	11	1	0	0	0	0
26	DF	(England) ENG	Andrew Taylor	20	3	20	3	0	0	0	0
27	DF	(England) ENG	Joe Bennett	33	0	31	0	1	0	1	0
28	FW	(England) ENG	Jonathan Franks	5	0	4	0	1	0	0	0
29	DF	(England) ENG	Anthony McMahon	34	2	33	2	1	0	0	0
30	GK	(England) ENG	Jason Steele	36	0	34	0	0	0	2	0
32	MF	(Netherlands) NED	Marvin Emnes	22	3	21	3	0	0	1	0
33	MF	(England) ENG	Richard Smallwood	12	1	12	1	0	0	0	0
34	DF	(England) ENG	Ben Gibson	1	0	1	0	0	0	0	0
35	MF	(Angola) ANG	Bruno Pilatos	0	0	0	0	0	0	0	0
36	DF	(England) ENG	Matthew Kilgallon*	3	0	2	0	0	0	1	0
37	MF	(Senegal) SEN	Mickaël Tavares	13	0	13	0	0	0	0	0
38	MF	(Scotland) SCO	Cameron Park	3	0	3	0	0	0	0	0
39	GK	(England) ENG	Connor Ripley	1	0	1	0	0	0	0	0
41	MF	(England) ENG	Adam Reach	1	1	1	1	0	0	0	0

(*: player has since left club)

== Transfers ==
=== In ===
Date	Player	Club	Fee
1 July 2010	(Scotland) Andrew Halliday	(Scotland) Livingston	Undisclosed
5 July 2010	(Scotland) Kris Boyd	(Scotland) Rangers	Free
7 July 2010	(England) Nicky Bailey	(England) Charlton	£1.4 million
13 July 2010	(Scotland) Stephen McManus	(Scotland) Celtic	£1.5 million
16 July 2010	(Scotland) Kevin Thomson	(Scotland) Rangers	£2 million
28 July 2010	(Estonia) Tarmo Kink	(Hungary) Győri ETO	Undisclosed
31 January 2011	(Germany) Maximilian Haas	(Germany) Bayern Munich	Undisclosed
31 January 2011	(Morocco) Merouane Zemmama	(Scotland) Hibernian	Undisclosed

=== Out ===
Date	Player	Club	Fee
1 July 2010	(Austria) Emanuel Pogatetz	(Germany) Hannover 96	Free
23 July 2010	(England) John Johnson	(England) Northampton Town	Undisclosed
17 August 2010	(Australia) Brad Jones	(England) Liverpool	£2.3 million
20 August 2010	(England) Josh Walker	(England) Watford	Free
23 August 2010	(Egypt) Mido	(Netherlands) Ajax	Free
20 January 2011	(England) David Wheater	(England) Bolton Wanderers	Undisclosed
25 January 2011	(England) Gary O'Neil	(England) West Ham	Undisclosed

=== Loan in ===
Date	Player	Club	Until
20 August 2010	(England) Matthew Kilgallon	(England) Sunderland	End of Season (returned to Sunderland)
27 August 2010	(Senegal) Mickaël Tavares	(Germany) Hamburg	January 2011
18 February 2011	(England) Andrew Davies	(England) Stoke City	End of Season
8 March 2011	(England) Paul Smith	(England) Nottingham Forest	End of Season

=== Loan out ===
Date	Player	Club	Until
19 August 2010	(France) Didier Digard	(France) OGC Nice	End of Season
31 August 2010	(England) Jonathan Grounds	(Scotland) Hibernian	January 2011
31 August 2010	(England) Andrew Taylor	(England) Watford	January 2011
18 October 2010	(Netherlands) Marvin Emnes	(Wales) Swansea City	November 2010
19 November 2010	(Scotland) Lee Miller	(England) Notts County	January 2011
28 January 2011	(Scotland) Lee Miller	(England) Scunthorpe United	End of Season
8 March 2011	(Scotland) Kris Boyd	(England) Nottingham Forest	End of Season
