= Herald and Post =

The Herald and Post is the name given to various weekly freesheets that deliver to households in much of the United Kingdom. The title is published by a variety of publishers; each edition consisting mainly of advertising and promotional pieces, with news items often sourced from sister publications. In particular, it may refer to:

- Aberdeen Herald & Post, later the Aberdeen Citizen
- Edinburgh Herald and Post
- Fife Herald & Post
- Northampton Herald & Post
- Northumberland Herald and Post
- Perth Herald & Post
- Peterborough Herald and Post
- Herald and Post (Teesside)
- West Lothian Herald & Post
