= Herald & Post (Teesside) =

British newspaper

The Herald & Post is a free newspaper series published by the Evening Gazette in Teesside, England.

The Herald & Post is a free weekly newspaper delivered to the majority of households in the Tees Valley area. There are six different editions of the Herald & Post published each week in order to make it specifically relevant to the area that it will be distributed to. The six editions are made up of:

the Middlesbrough edition,
the Stockton & Billingham edition,
the East Cleveland edition,
the Darlington edition,
the South Durham edition, and
the North Yorkshire edition.

Each edition is a mixture of general news, local news, sports and events information.

== See also ==
- Herald and Post (disambiguation)
