= Ben Hutchinson =

English footballer

Personal information
- Full name: Benjamin Lloyd Phillip Hutchinson
- Date of birth: 27 November 1987 (age 38)
- Place of birth: Nottingham, England
- Height: 1.80 m (5 ft 11 in)
- Position: Striker

Team information
- Current team: Carlton Town

Youth career
- Arnold Town
- Middlesbrough

Senior career*
| Years | Team | Apps | (Gls) |
| 2005–2008 | Middlesbrough | 8 | (1) |
| 2006–2007 | → Billingham Synthonia (loan) | 14 | (7) |
| 2008–2011 | Celtic | 5 | (0) |
| 2009–2010 | → Swindon Town (loan) | 10 | (1) |
| 2010 | → Dundee (loan) | 9 | (1) |
| 2010–2011 | → Lincoln City (loan) | 36 | (4) |
| 2011 | Kilmarnock | 4 | (0) |
| 2012–2014 | Mansfield Town | 38 | (7) |
| 2014 | Nuneaton Town | 11 | (0) |
| 2015 | Basford United | 11 | (2) |
| 2016–2017 | Belper Town | ? | (?) |
| 2017–2020 | Carlton Town | ? | (?) |
- * Club domestic league appearances and goals as of 01:22, 5 October 2016 (UTC)

Benjamin Lloyd Phillip Hutchinson (born 27 November 1987) is an English footballer who played for Carlton Town as a striker.

== Club career ==
=== Early career ===
Hutchinson's performances for Arnold Town in the FA Youth Cup during the 2005–06 season saw him watched by numerous scouts. After scoring four goals in the 7–1 win over Dunston, Middlesbrough lined up and completed the signing of Hutchinson in the hours before the January 2006 transfer window ended. The transfer deal was worth up to £100,000 based on appearances.

=== Middlesbrough ===
Hutchinson established himself in the Under-18 side before moving up to the reserves, before going on loan at Billingham Synthonia. After starting 2007–08 with the reserves, and scoring three goals in three games, he made the first team squad for the game versus Tottenham Hotspur in the League Cup, though he was an unused substitute.

Injuries to most of the first team strike force saw him make his first senior Middlesbrough appearance in the Premier League game away at Manchester City on 7 October 2007, after coming on as substitute for fellow reserve striker Tom Craddock. He marked his debut with a goal in the final minutes of the match, though it was only a consolation goal as the team went down to a 3–1 defeat. He made his first start as a lone striker on 5 January 2008 away at Bristol City in the FA Cup third round.

=== Celtic ===
On 26 January 2008, Hutchinson signed a pre-contract agreement with Scottish Premier League champions Celtic to join them at the beginning of the 2008–09 season, although five days later, on 31 January, he signed a deal to join Celtic immediately. He said it would be a "tremendous experience to play in front of 60,000 fans".

=== Swindon Town ===
On 27 August 2009, Hutchinson joined Swindon Town on loan until January 2010 along with Celtic teammate Simon Ferry. He scored his first goal for Swindon on 3 October in a 3–2 victory away at Brentford.

=== Dundee ===
On 1 February 2010, Hutchinson joined Scottish Division One side Dundee on loan until the end of the 2009–10 season. On 6 February 2010, Hutchinson scored on his debut for Dundee in a Scottish Cup match against Ayr United.

=== Lincoln City ===
On 21 August 2010, Hutchinson made his debut for the club in a 1–0 win over Gillingham. On 4 September 2010, Hutchinson scored his first goal for the club in a 2–1 loss against Chesterfield. Signed as part of former Celtic player Chris Sutton's revolution at Sincil Bank, his early promise failed to continue and he ended up as a squad player involved in the team's relegation from the Football League.

=== Kilmarnock ===
On 19 July 2011, Kilmarnock confirmed they had agreed to sign Hutchinson on a six-month deal. Hutchinson scored his first goal for Kilmarnock in a 5–0 win over Queen of the South in a third round match in the Scottish League Cup, scoring the fifth goal in the win. Unable to establish himself in the team because of injury and Paul Heffernan's good form, he left the club at the end of his contract.

=== Mansfield Town ===
On 1 January 2012, Hutchinson moved to Mansfield Town on a free transfer, signing a contract until the end of the season, in the hope of "getting [his] career back on track". After two and a half years with Mansfield, Hutchinson was released at the end of the 13/14 season.

=== Nuneaton Town and Basford United ===
In August 2014, Hutchinson transferred to Nuneaton Town, but was released later the same year after eleven appearances without a goal. In the summer of 2015, he joined Basford United, scoring two goals in eleven games for the club before leaving in November. Now retired as of Saturday 21st of June 2025.

== Honours ==
- Won Knight & Co charity tournament
