= 2007–08 Middlesbrough F.C. season =

Middlesbrough F.C.
2007–08 season
- Chairman: Steve Gibson
- Manager: Gareth Southgate
- Premier League: 13th
- FA Cup: Sixth round
- League Cup: Third round
- Top goalscorer: League: Stewart Downing (9); All: Stewart Downing (10)
- Highest home attendance: Home: 33,952 v Man Utd; Away: 75,720 v Man Utd
- Lowest home attendance: Home: 11,686 v Northampton; Away: 6,258 v Mansfield
- Average home league attendance: 26,707

- All Competitions
| | Wins | Draws | Losses | Win % |
| Home | 9 | 5 | 8 | 40.9% |
| Away | 5 | 8 | 10 | 21.7% |
| Both | 14 | 13 | 18 | 31.1% |

- Premier League
| | Wins | Draws | Losses | Win % |
| Home | 7 | 5 | 7 | 36.8% |
| Away | 3 | 7 | 9 | 15.8% |
| Both | 10 | 12 | 16 | 26.3% |

During the 2007–08 season, Middlesbrough participated in the Premier League. The season saw them play their 4000th league game, versus Reading on 1 March 2008. They reached the third round of the League Cup, where they were knocked out by eventual winners Tottenham Hotspur, while in their FA Cup campaign they were knocked out by Championship side Cardiff City.

Gareth Southgate continued as manager under chairman Steve Gibson. George Boateng retained the captaincy from the previous season, until being replaced at the beginning of 2008 by Julio Arca. Arca's poor form saw him dropped in March, and Emanuel Pogatetz was handed the captaincy in his absence, and later retained it upon Arca's return to the side, though any permanent decision was put off until the following season.

January saw Middlesbrough smash their transfer record to pay a fee of around £12 million for Brazilian striker Afonso Alves.

== Team kit and sponsors ==
During this season, Middlesbrough's kits were produced by Erreà. 888.com's contract with the club expired, and after prolonged negotiations leading to a delay in the release of the new kit, Middlesbrough announced that the new sponsors would be GPS manufacturer Garmin on 20 July 2007.

On 16 July 2007, the club announced that the new home shirt would be predominantly red with white trim. The away shirt was revealed on 20 July 2007 as being predominantly white with gold trim.

| Home colours | Away colours |

== Transfers ==
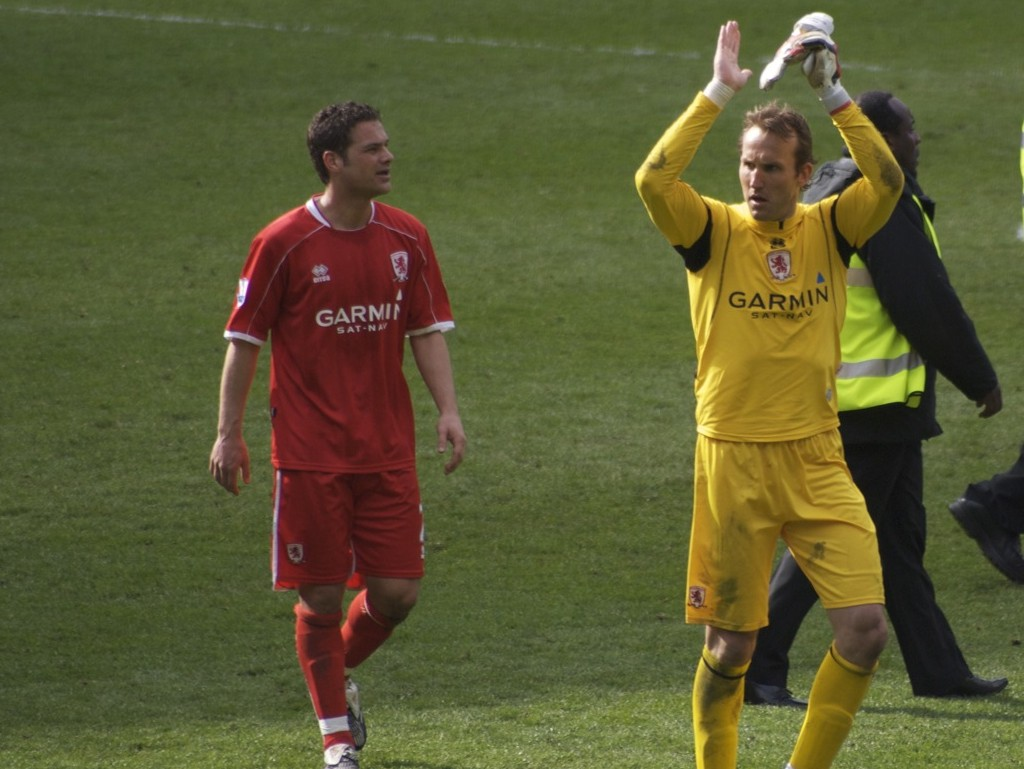
Summer arrival Luke Young (left), alongside Mark Schwarzer – who left at the end of the season.

=== Summer transfer window ===
Early pre-season was dominated by the protracted contract talks involving Mark Viduka. West Ham United, and Birmingham City were rumoured destinations for the Boro striker, before he eventually decided to move on a Bosman free transfer to Newcastle United. This meant Boro had only two strikers remaining in Yakubu and Lee Dong-Gook having also released Malcolm Christie and Danny Graham at the ends of their contracts. Jérémie Aliadière from Arsenal and Tuncay from Fenerbahçe were brought in as replacements. Right back Luke Young was also brought in on 26 July 2007 for £2.5 million from relegated Charlton Athletic following the departures of Abel Xavier and Stuart Parnaby on free transfers.

After just short of a hundred appearances, youth academy graduate James Morrison moved on to West Bromwich Albion for an initial £1.75 million.

Two games into the league season, Egyptian striker Mido was brought in from Tottenham Hotspur for £6 million in order to improve the team's attacking options, beating off competition from Sunderland and Birmingham City.

Following Mido's arrival, speculation intensified regarding Yakubu, who had been linked with moves to Manchester City, and Birmingham City before Boro announced a fee was agreed with Everton. The move was completed on 29 August for £11.25 million, an Everton record and Boro's second highest fee ever received (behind Juninho's £12 million fee in 1997) and meant the club's five main strikers from twelve months earlier had all left the club.

Mido's fellow Egyptian international teammate Mohamed Shawky was set to undergo for three-day trial along with teammate Emad Moteab, however Middlesbrough decided on only pursuing their interest in Shawky, who signed on transfer deadline day for £650,000 on a three-year contract. At the same time, Jason Euell moved to Southampton on a free transfer after having his contract cancelled, and David Knight was released to join Swansea City. With less than an hour remaining before the transfer deadline, Boro completed a £5 million move for Portsmouth's Gary O'Neil.

=== January transfer window ===
The early part of the transfer window saw prolonged and widespread reports linking Boro with Brazilian strikers Afonso Alves of Heerenveen and Fred of Lyon, interest which was later confirmed by Gareth Southgate. Any move for Alves was delayed by a contractual dispute. AZ Alkmaar claimed they had signed a pre-contract agreement with Alves, though the Dutch FA ruled against them, while Southgate said a move for Fred was looking "complicated" and "unlikely". The move was completed in the final hour of the window for an undisclosed Middlesbrough record fee.

In December it was reported that Barcelona midfielder Ronaldinho was a £10m target for the club. These rumours died down and the Brazilian moved to A.C. Milan in the summer.

The first move however, saw Academy product Andrew Davies leave the club for Southampton for an undisclosed fee, following a successful three-month loan spell.

Stewart Downing was once again linked with a move to Tottenham Hotspur at the start of the window. Those reports died away, but widespread media reports emerged at the start of the final week of the window that both Tottenham and Newcastle had come to an agreement with Boro over a fee for fellow home-town star Jonathan Woodgate (only signed in the summer from Real Madrid for £7 million) and the player had been allowed to speak with them. It was confirmed on 28 January that Woodgate had signed for Tottenham for an undisclosed fee.

Meanwhile, Celtic signed a pre-contract agreement with Middlesbrough's young striker Ben Hutchinson after the club failed to agree a new contract with the 20-year-old. Boro were due compensation for the move. Celtic later agreed to pay Middlesbrough a compensation fee (reported to be around £250,000) to allow Hutchinson to leave before the end of the window.

=== End of season ===
At the end of the season, Gareth Southgate confirmed that Fábio Rochemback, Gaizka Mendieta and Lee Dong-Gook would all be leaving the club once their contracts finished at the end of June. Later the same day it was announced Rochemback was returning to his former club Sporting Lisbon.

Port Vale signed youngster Steve Thompson after he impressed for them in two reserve team games.

Mark Schwarzer rejected a new two-year deal from Middlesbrough and signed a contract with Fulham at the end of the season, ending his 11-year spell on Teesside that put him 8th in the all-time Middlesbrough appearance records.

Out of contract Jason Kennedy left to join Darlington, where he had ended the season on loan.

=== Summary ===
==== In ====
For 2007–08 Academy recruits see Academy squad.

| Date | Player | Previous club | Fee | Ref |
|---|---|---|---|---|
| 1 July 2007 | (England) Jonathan Woodgate | Real Madrid | £7 million | |
| 1 July 2007 | (France) Jérémie Aliadière | Arsenal | £2 million^{[A]} | |
| 4 July 2007 | (Turkey) Tuncay | Fenerbahçe | Free | |
| 26 July 2007 | (England) Luke Young | Charlton Athletic | £2.5 million | |
| 16 August 2007 | (Egypt) Mido | Tottenham Hotspur | £6 million | |
| 31 August 2007 | (Egypt) Mohamed Shawky | Al Ahly | £650,000 | |
| 31 August 2007 | (England) Gary O'Neil | Portsmouth | £2.5 million^{[B]} | |
| 31 January 2008 | (Brazil) Afonso Alves | Heerenveen | Undisclosed^{[C]} | |
| 7 February 2008 | (England) Sam Filler | Bradford City | Undisclosed^{[D]} | |

==== Out ====
For departures of players out of contract at the end of 2006–07 see 2006–07 Middlesbrough F.C. season.

| Date | Player | New Club | Fee | Ref |
|---|---|---|---|---|
| 7 August 2007 | (England) James Morrison | West Bromwich Albion | £1.5 million^{[E]} | |
| 29 August 2007 | (Nigeria) Yakubu | Everton | £11.25 million | |
| 31 August 2007 | (Jamaica) Jason Euell | Southampton | Free | |
| 31 August 2007 | (England) David Knight | Swansea City | Free | |
| 10 January 2008 | (England) Andrew Davies | Southampton | Undisclosed^{[F]} | |
| 28 January 2008 | (England) Jonathan Woodgate | Tottenham Hotspur | Undisclosed^{[G]} | |
| 31 January 2008 | (England) Ben Hutchinson | Celtic | Undisclosed^{[H]} | |
| 13 May 2008 | (Brazil) Fábio Rochemback | Sporting Lisbon | Out of contract | |
| 13 May 2008 | (South Korea) Lee Dong-Gook | – | Out of contract | |
| 13 May 2008 | (Spain) Gaizka Mendieta | – | Out of contract | |
| 14 May 2008 | (England) Steve Thompson | Port Vale | Out of contract | |
| 22 May 2008 | (Australia) Mark Schwarzer | Fulham | Out of contract | |
| 30 May 2008 | (England) Jason Kennedy | Darlington | Out of contract | |
| June 2008 | (England) Matthew Atkinson | – | Out of contract | |
| June 2008 | (England) David Hillerby | – | Out of contract | |
| June 2008 | (England) Lewis McCardle | – | Out of contract | |
| June 2008 | (England) Lewis Smith | – | Out of contract | |

==== Loans out ====
| Date | Player | Club At | Period | Ref |
|---|---|---|---|---|
| 26 July 2007 | (England) Ross Turnbull | Cardiff City | To 5 October 2007^{[J]} | |
| 3 August 2007 | (England) Jason Kennedy | Livingston | To 1 January 2008 | |
| 14 September 2007 | (England) Adam Johnson | Watford | To 16 November 2007^{[K]} | |
| 9 October 2007 | (England) Andrew Davies | Southampton | 3 months | |
| 10 November 2007 | (England) Anthony McMahon | Blackpool | 1 month | |
| 29 January 2008 | (England) Josh Walker | Aberdeen | To end of season | |
| 30 January 2008 | (England) Matthew Bates | Norwich City | To 14 February 2008^{[L]} | |
| 13 February 2008 | (England) Tom Craddock | Hartlepool United | 1 month | |
| 29 February 2008 | (England) Chris Riggott | Stoke City | To 2 May 2008^{[M]} | |
| 29 February 2008 | (England) Jason Kennedy | Darlington | To end of season | |
| 27 March 2008 | (England) Graeme Owens | Chesterfield | To end of season | |

==== Notes ====
^{A} Aliadière was purchased for an initial fee of £2 million.
^{B} O'Neil was purchased for an initial fee £2.5 million. The fee could rise to slightly more than £5 million based on appearances.
^{C} Alves' fee was confirmed to be a Middlesbrough transfer record. Manager Gareth Southgate verbally implied the fee was £12 million.
^{D} Filler was signed for an upfront fee, with further amounts tied into his future progress.
^{E} Morrison was sold for an initial fee of £1.5 million. The fee could rise to £2.2 million based on appearances. Middlesbrough are also due 15% of any sell on fee.
^{F} Davies' fee was reported to be around £1 million.
^{G} Woodgate's fee was reported to be around £7–8 million.
^{H} Hutchinson signed a pre-contract agreement with Celtic around 26 January 2008, with the move due to take place once out of contract at the end of June. Middlesbrough were due compensation for the player leaving due to him being younger than 24 years of age, but an earlier move was agreed for a fee reported to be around £250,000.
^{J} Turnbull's loan period was initially intended to last the full season, but he returned early following injuries to Middlesbrough's first team squad.
^{K} Johnson's loan to Watford was initially intended to last three months, but he was recalled early.
^{L} Bates' loan to Norwich was initially intended to last three months, but he returned early following a knee injury.
^{M} Riggott's loan to Stoke City was initially intended to last until the end of the season, however he was recalled early.

== Squad ==
=== Senior squad ===
==== Appearances and goals ====
Appearance and goalscoring records for all the players who were in the Middlesbrough F.C. first team squad during the 2007–08 season.

| No. | Pos | Nat | Player | Total | | Premier League | | FA Cup | | League Cup | |
| No. | Pos | Nat | Player | Apps | Goals | Apps | Goals | Apps | Goals | Apps | Goals |
|---|---|---|---|---|---|---|---|---|---|---|---|
| 1 | GK | (Australia) AUS | Mark Schwarzer | 39 | 0 | 34 | 0 | 5 | 0 | 0 | 0 |
| 2 | DF | (England) ENG | Luke Young | 40 | 1 | 35 | 1 | 5 | 0 | 0 | 0 |
| 3 | MF | (Argentina) ARG | Julio Arca | 29 | 2 | 23+1 | 2 | 5 | 0 | 0 | 0 |
| 4 | MF | (England) ENG | Gary O'Neil | 29 | 0 | 25+1 | 0 | 3 | 0 | 0 | 0 |
| 5 | DF | (England) ENG | Chris Riggott | 11 | 1 | 9+1 | 1 | 0 | 0 | 1 | 0 |
| 6 | DF | (Austria) AUT | Emanuel Pogatetz | 29 | 0 | 23+1 | 0 | 5 | 0 | 0 | 0 |
| 7 | MF | (Netherlands) NED | George Boateng | 37 | 1 | 29+4 | 1 | 2 | 0 | 2 | 0 |
| 8 | DF | (England) ENG | Jonathan Woodgate | 16 | 0 | 16 | 0 | 0 | 0 | 0 | 0 |
| 9 | FW | (Egypt) EGY | Mido | 17 | 2 | 8+4 | 2 | 4 | 0 | 1 | 0 |
| 10 | MF | (Brazil) BRA | Fábio Rochemback | 33 | 2 | 21+5 | 1 | 5 | 0 | 2 | 1 |
| 11 | FW | (France) FRA | Jérémie Aliadière | 31 | 5 | 26+3 | 5 | 2 | 0 | 0 | 0 |
| 12 | FW | (Brazil) BRA | Afonso Alves | 14 | 6 | 7+4 | 6 | 3 | 0 | 0 | 0 |
| 14 | DF | (Germany) GER | Robert Huth | 16 | 1 | 9+4 | 1 | 3 | 0 | 0 | 0 |
| 15 | MF | (Egypt) EGY | Mohamed Shawky | 6 | 0 | 3+2 | 0 | 0 | 0 | 1 | 0 |
| 16 | FW | (Jamaica) JAM | Jason Euell | 0 | 0 | 0 | 0 | 0 | 0 | 0 | 0 |
| 17 | FW | (Turkey) TUR | Tuncay | 38 | 8 | 27+7 | 8 | 3 | 0 | 1 | 0 |
| 18 | FW | (South Korea) KOR | Lee Dong-Gook | 18 | 2 | 5+9 | 0 | 2 | 1 | 2 | 1 |
| 19 | MF | (England) ENG | Stewart Downing | 45 | 10 | 38 | 9 | 5 | 1 | 2 | 0 |
| 20 | FW | (Nigeria) NGR | Yakubu | 2 | 0 | 2 | 0 | 0 | 0 | 0 | 0 |
| 21 | GK | (England) ENG | Ross Turnbull | 3 | 0 | 3 | 0 | 0 | 0 | 0 | 0 |
| 22 | GK | (Australia) AUS | Brad Jones | 3 | 0 | 1 | 0 | 0 | 0 | 2 | 0 |
| 24 | DF | (England) ENG | Andrew Davies | 6 | 0 | 3+1 | 0 | 0 | 0 | 2 | 0 |
| 26 | DF | (England) ENG | Matthew Bates | 0 | 0 | 0 | 0 | 0 | 0 | 0 | 0 |
| 27 | MF | (England) ENG | Lee Cattermole | 28 | 1 | 10+14 | 1 | 2 | 0 | 2 | 0 |
| 28 | MF | (England) ENG | Adam Johnson | 24 | 1 | 3+16 | 1 | 4 | 0 | 1 | 0 |
| 29 | DF | (England) ENG | Anthony McMahon | 1 | 0 | 0+1 | 0 | 0 | 0 | 0 | 0 |
| 31 | DF | (England) ENG | David Wheater | 40 | 4 | 34 | 3 | 4 | 1 | 2 | 0 |
| 32 | GK | (England) ENG | David Knight | 0 | 0 | 0 | 0 | 0 | 0 | 0 | 0 |
| 32 | GK | (England) ENG | Jason Steele | 0 | 0 | 0 | 0 | 0 | 0 | 0 | 0 |
| 33 | DF | (England) ENG | Andrew Taylor | 21 | 0 | 18+1 | 0 | 0 | 0 | 2 | 0 |
| 34 | MF | (England) ENG | Jason Kennedy | 0 | 0 | 0 | 0 | 0 | 0 | 0 | 0 |
| 35 | MF | (England) ENG | Graeme Owens | 1 | 0 | 0 | 0 | 0 | 0 | 1 | 0 |
| 36 | FW | (England) ENG | Ben Hutchinson | 9 | 1 | 0+8 | 1 | 1 | 0 | 0 | 0 |
| 38 | DF | (England) ENG | Seb Hines | 3 | 0 | 0+1 | 0 | 1 | 0 | 1 | 0 |
| 40 | DF | (England) ENG | Jonathan Grounds | 7 | 0 | 5 | 0 | 2 | 0 | 0 | 0 |
| 41 | MF | (England) ENG | Josh Walker | 0 | 0 | 0 | 0 | 0 | 0 | 0 | 0 |
| 42 | FW | (England) ENG | Tom Craddock | 4 | 0 | 1+2 | 0 | 0 | 0 | 1 | 0 |

==== Discipline ====
Middlesbrough finished the season with the worst disciplinary record in the Premier League and were subsequently fined £20,000 and a suspended £30,000.
Disciplinary records for 2007–08 league and cup matches. Players with 1 card or more included only.

| No. | Nat. | Player | Yellow cards | Red cards |
|---|---|---|---|---|
| 1 | (Australia) | Mark Schwarzer | 2 | 0 |
| 2 | (England) | Luke Young | 8 | 0 |
| 3 | (Argentina) | Julio Arca | 7 | 0 |
| 4 | (England) | Gary O'Neil | 10 | 0 |
| 6 | (Austria) | Emanuel Pogatetz | 5 | 0 |
| 7 | (Netherlands) | George Boateng | 9 | 0 |
| 8 | (England) | Jonathan Woodgate | 4 | 0 |
| 9 | (Egypt) | Mido | 4 | 1 |
| 10 | (Brazil) | Fábio Rochemback | 10 | 0 |
| 11 | (France) | Jérémie Aliadière | 4 | 1 |
| 14 | (Germany) | Robert Huth | 5 | 0 |
| 15 | (Egypt) | Mohamed Shawky | 1 | 0 |
| 17 | (Turkey) | Tuncay | 4 | 0 |
| 18 | (South Korea) | Lee Dong-Gook | 2 | 0 |
| 19 | (England) | Stewart Downing | 5 | 0 |
| 27 | (England) | Lee Cattermole | 8 | 0 |
| 28 | (England) | Adam Johnson | 2 | 0 |
| 31 | (England) | David Wheater | 9 | 0 |
| 38 | (England) | Seb Hines | 1 | 0 |
| 40 | (England) | Jonathan Grounds | 1 | 0 |

=== Reserve squad ===
Reserve players for 2007–08 season. Senior squad and Academy players are eligible to play for the Reserves. Those listed here agreed professional contracts and had no squad number during this season.

| Nat. | Position | Player |
|---|---|---|
| (England) | GK | Sam Filler |
| (Wales) | DF | Rhys Williams |
| (France) | MF | Hérold Goulon |
| (Spain) | MF | Gaizka Mendieta |
| (England) | FW | Jonathan Franks |

=== Academy squad ===
Academy players for 2007–08 season.

| Nat. | Position | Player | Academy year |
|---|---|---|---|
| (England) | FW | Nathan Bonar | 1 |
| (England) | MF | Ryan Burton | 1 |
| (England) | DF | Ashley Corker | 1 |
| (England) | MF | James Cronesberry} | 1 |
| (England) | DF | Theo Furness | 1 |
| (England) | MF | Jonathan Harris | 1 |
| (England) | FW | Gary Martin | 1 |
| (England) | DF | Jordan Robinson | 1 |
| (England) | MF | Richard Smallwood | 1 |
| (England) | FW | Jason White | 1 |
| (England) | GK | Matthew Atkinson | 2 |
| (England) | DF | Joe Bennett | 2 |
| (England) | MF | David Hillerby | 2 |
| (England) | DF | Lewis McCardle | 2 |
| (England) | FW | Nathan Porritt | 2 |
| (Canada) | MF | Shaun Saiko | 2 |
| (England) | DF | Lewis Smith | 2 |
| (England) | DF | John Johnson | 3 |
| (England) | FW | Steve Thompson | 3 |

== Preseason ==
=== Results ===
Win Draw Loss

Note: Results are given with Middlesbrough score listed first. Man of the Match is according to mfc.co.uk.

| Game | Date | Venue | Opponent | Result F–A | Attendance | Boro Goalscorers | Man of the Match | Report |
|---|---|---|---|---|---|---|---|---|
| 1 | 13 July 2007 | N | Schalke 04 | 0–3 | | | Wheater | Report |
| 2 | 17 July 2007 | N | Hertha Berlin | 1–1 | | Yakubu | Turnbull | Report |
| 3 | 21 July 2007 | A | Burnley | 1–1 | | Morrison 54' | | Report |
| 4 | 24 July 2007 | A | Darlington | 2–0 | 4,395 | Craddock (2) | Bennett | Report |
| 5 | 28 July 2007 | A | Hibernian | 0–1 | 9,082 | | | Report |
| 6 | 31 July 2007 | A | Carlisle United | 2–0 | | Kennedy 14', Hutchinson 87' | | Report |
| 7 | 4 August 2007 | H | AZ | 2–0 | 6,752 | Downing 2', Yakubu 16' | Wheater | Report |
| 8 | 7 August 2007 | A | Billingham Synthonia | 4–2 | | Grounds 25', Craddock (2) 66' (pen.), 77', Hope 86' (o.g.) | | Report |

== Premier League ==
=== August ===
Nearing the start of the season, the first team was dealing with injuries to five of the club's centre backs: Woodgate, Huth, Bates, Pogatetz and Riggott, leaving the prospect of a shortage of players available for the first game of the season.

Chris Riggott returned from injury for Middlesbrough's first game of the season, but Young missed the game with a slight groin problem, leaving Boro starting with far from their first choice defence. However, Boro were more focused on attack and for the second season running Stewart Downing scored Boro's first goal of the season to give Boro a 1–0 lead, before – also for the second season running – their opponents came from behind to win, this time Blackburn 1–2.

The situation didn't improve in the next game as they went down to a poor 0–1 defeat away at Wigan.

Despite lacking match fitness, Mido was included in place of Yakubu who was dropped from the squad for the game at Fulham. The first substitution of the game came after just eight minutes as referee Lee Mason limped off to be replaced by Andy D'Urso. Middlesbrough came from behind as Mido scored a debut goal, and Lee Cattermole the second as Boro secured their first points with a controversial 2–1 win, as replays appeared to show Fulham were denied a legitimate goal towards the end.

Woodgate, Rochemback and Young were thrust back into action for the Tyne–Tees derby, which ended in a 2–2 draw. Viduka scored on his Riverside return, with Arca and Mido scoring for Middlesbrough. The game was suffered from allegations of abusive chants towards Mido by Newcastle United fans, prompting an inquiry into the incident by the FA.

=== September ===
Middlesbrough followed their midweek cup win with a 2–0 victory over Birmingham.

Despite a good performance away at West Ham United, Middlesbrough went down to a 0–3 defeat.

A week later, Boro played Sunderland in the seventh match of the season. Sunderland took the lead in the second minute, but Julio Arca scored against his former club (his second in as many north east derbies this season) to bring the teams level. Stewart Downing scored from 25 yards in the second half, only for Sunderland to level the scores to 2–2 in the last minutes of the game. The game was marred by injuries to Tuncay, Arca and Mido.

Middlesbrough, still struggling with injuries, made it almost a month without a win when they lost 0–2 to Everton, Yakubu playing but not scoring in the victory over his former side.

=== October ===
At the City of Manchester Stadium, Middlesbrough went down to a 1–3 defeat versus Manchester City, with Ben Hutchinson scoring a consolation goal on his debut.

Following the international break, Middlesbrough were back at home for the first time in almost a month, aiming to beat Chelsea at home for the third time in a row, but they could not repeat the feat, resulting in a 0–2 defeat as Boro's run was stretched to six games in all competitions without a win.

Things didn't get any easier in their next game, away versus Manchester United. Wheater, Cattermole and Aliadière returned to the starting lineup, but the match began the same way as Middlesbrough's previous four: conceding a goal within the opening ten minutes. However, Aliadière soon equalised with his first Boro goal, and the first home league goal United had conceded that season. A Downing error gifted Manchester United their second, and Tevez added two more goals in the second half. The 1–4 defeat meant Middlesbrough had then conceded sixteen goals in six league games, while scoring only four.

=== November ===
The team's run of losses finally ended, coming from behind to claim a 1–1 draw at home to Tottenham Hotspur; Luke Young denying his former team the victory.

Emanuel Pogatetz returned to the squad for the game away at Bolton, and after thirty minutes he was called into action to replace the injured Andrew Taylor, helping Boro to a 0–0 draw, their second clean sheet of the season and first draw on the road.

Adam Johnson was recalled from his successful loan spell at Watford (where he scored 5 goals in 11 games) in time for the home game versus Aston Villa. He was immediately restored to the starting line-up, beginning the game on the left with Downing moving up front. Boro started well but conceded just before half time, and again just after the break, with the third going in ten minutes later. Astonishingly despite the 0–3 defeat, Middlesbrough avoided dropping into the bottom three: Bolton won versus Manchester United and moved out of the drop zone, but Sunderland's 1–7 defeat at Everton dropped them below the Boro on goal difference.

=== December ===
News arrived before the away game at Reading that Mido would be out until the 2008 at least, while Andrew Taylor and Mark Schwarzer would be missing for around three weeks. On match day, Ross Turnbull started in goal with England U-17 keeper Jason Steele making the bench. While Boro started well, for the twelfth time in fifteen games they conceded the first goal of the game, eight minutes into the second half. Robert Huth made his first appearance of the season, replacing Woodgate after seventy minutes, while Tuncay replaced Dong-Gook Lee. The substitution worked as Tuncay finally grabbed his first Boro goal and it ended 1–1. Sunderland's victory against Derby County however, meant Boro dropped into the relegation zone.

The visit from league leaders Arsenal was likely to be a tough game, but Boro were awarded a penalty after four minutes (the first penalty in a Middlesbrough game this season), which Downing converted for his fourth goal of the season. Tuncay scored his second in two games to increase the lead, before Tomáš Rosický scored in the final seconds of the game. The 2–1 win subjected Arsenal to their first defeat of the season, while Middlesbrough ended their run of eleven games without a win.

Tuncay made it three goals in three in the 1–0 victory at Derby.

Julio Arca made his first start since September following his return from injury, replacing Rochemback who was suspended after picking up five yellow cards. David Wheater put Boro into the lead after 40 minutes, but West Ham replied with two goals. The 1–2 scoreline gave the away side their first win at the Riverside Stadium.

The festive programme continued badly with a 0–3 defeat away at Birmingham City, Downing opening the scoring with an own goal, giving the hosts their first home win under new manager Alex McLeish.

It was 31 October 1953 when Middlesbrough last won a top flight game at Fratton Park, and 1990 saw their last victory there at all levels. Tuncay gave Boro the lead against a Portsmouth side that hadn't scored at home since September, and it was enough to give them their third away victory of the season, their second 1–0. The game also saw Mark Schwarzer surpass Tony Mowbray and Stephen Pears' totals to move into ninth in the all-time Middlesbrough appearance records, after playing his 425th game for the club. The result also saw Schwarzer overtake Dennis Bergkamp as the foreign player with the most Premier League appearances for one club.

=== January ===
Boro didn't begin the new year the way they had hoped in their game versus Everton at home, failing to take their chances and succumbing to a 0–2 defeat.

Reserve team captain Jonathan Grounds made his Boro debut for the visit of Liverpool to the Riverside, with Pogatetz suffering with a virus. Boateng also returned as captain, having been left out of the last few games, and scored the opening goal of the game, witnessed by the highest crowd of the season so far. Liverpool equalised to tie the game at 1–1.

At Blackburn, Arca captained the side from the start, despite Boateng also starting. David Wheater put Boro ahead after 13 minutes with his fourth goal of the season. Arca went off injured at half time and Pogatetz became captain. Matt Derbyshire equalised during the second half to give Rovers a share of the points in the 1–1 draw. Manager Gareth Southgate announced after the game that Boateng had been relieved of his captaincy to allow him to "be free in his mind to enjoy his football". It was then confirmed that Arca would be the new captain.

Jérémie Aliadière got his first Boro goal at the Riverside in the 1–0 win over Wigan Athletic.

=== February ===
Boro were made to rue missed chances during the derby at Newcastle when Michael Owen gave Newcastle the lead on the hour mark, but Robert Huth scored a late goal to draw Boro level and tie the game 1–1.

Aliadière got his third goal of the season at home to Fulham, while Alves made his debut after an hour as Boro did the double over their opponents with a 1–0 win.

Tuncay returned from injury for the game at Anfield and scored after 9 minutes, but a terrible error from Arca gifted Fernando Torres a goal after 28 minutes, and he got a second a minute later. He completed his hat-trick in the second half. Downing got a goal back late in the game, but Aliadière was then sent off. This 2–3 defeat was Boro's first in all competitions since the New Year's Day fixture against Everton. Aliadière's red card was appealed against after the game, but it was dismissed and the disciplinary committee extended the ban by one game to four games as they branded the appeal "frivolous", a decision which angered chairman Steve Gibson and Keith Lamb.

=== March ===
The first day of March marked Middlesbrough's 4000th league game, at home to a Reading side who had lost eight straight games going into the day's match. In typical Middlesbrough fashion, that run came to an end as Boro lost 1–0 after a late goal.

Following the Reading game was the home FA Cup tie versus Cardiff, where the team were defeated 2–0, producing a dreadful performance. The performance drew huge criticism from fans and they and manager alike demanded a better performance away at Villa Park three days later. Changes saw Arca dropped from the squad after a run of poor performances and Rochemback moved to the bench as Shawky and Boateng formed the new centre midfield partnership. Pogatetz captained the side. Downing got his seventh goal of the season after 23 minutes. Referee Steve Bennett gave Villa a penalty for a handball by Luke Young while the defender was looking the other way, which Gareth Barry slotted home. The game finished 1–1.

Three days later, Aliadière returned from his ban for the game against his old club at Arsenal and marked it with his fourth goal of the season in the 25th minute. Andrew Taylor made a long-awaited return from his December injury as a second-half substitute. Kolo Touré scored a late equaliser, and then Mido was sent off for a high challenge. The game ended 1–1 to leave Middlesbrough undefeated against Arsenal for this season. The club decided not to appeal against his card following consultation with referee's chief Keith Hackett.

Storms the night before meant that the South Stand of the Riverside was closed for the home tie with Derby. The game marked Boro's first home game since the Cardiff debacle. Tuncay got his sixth of the season in the first half. Heavy snow in the second half allowed Derby back into the game but Middlesbrough hung on to win 1–0.

After going behind very early in their game at Chelsea they spurned their chances in the second half, Alves hitting the post and Boro twice hitting the bar from a free kick. Chelsea were unable to extend their lead and so the tie finished 1–0.

=== April ===
Despite being at the start of April, the game at home to league leaders Manchester United was played in a snow storm, watched by the season's highest home attendance. Arca returned to the starting line-up following his rest, however Pogatetz retained the captaincy. It didn't start well for the home side with Ronaldo getting a goal inside ten minutes. However, Middlesbrough responded with two goals. Both came from Alves, either side of half time to open his Boro account. It was the first time this season that a Middlesbrough player had scored two goals in a game. Wayne Rooney pegged the game level later in the second half and the game ended in a 2–2 draw.

Grounds replacing the injured Taylor was the only change to the side for the game at White Hart Lane, which saw them up against former centre-back Jonathan Woodgate. Grounds was unfortunate to concede an own goal in the first half but Stewart Downing's eighth goal of the season drew the away side level. It finished 1–1.

Bolton visited the Riverside still in the relegation battle, while the home side had the chance to guarantee safety with a victory. Gary O'Neil, suspended anyway for this match and the next, was ruled out for the rest of the season with an injury and was replaced by Tuncay. Ross Turnbull was given a chance in goal after Mark Schwarzer was ruled out with a back problem. Boro dominated the opening minutes of first half, but went in for half time level. Bolton performed much better in the second half, and Boro much worse. Though the home side were denied a penalty shortly before the hour, the visitors took the 1–0 lead shortly after through Gavin McCann.

Still not safe, Boro went to the Stadium of Light for the Wear-Tees derby with Sunderland. Brad Jones made his first league appearance of the season while Schwarzer remained injured and Turnbull was only fit enough for the bench. Tuncay opened the scoring after 4 minutes, but less than 2 minutes later, the scores were again level. Sunderland took the lead just before half time. Alves got his third of the season after 74 minutes, but Boro conceded a goal two minutes into stoppage time to hand Sunderland a 3–2 victory.

=== May ===
Chris Riggott was recalled from his loan period at Stoke City for the home tie versus Portsmouth, and put straight into the side also featuring the return of Mark Schwarzer and Fabio Rochemback. Riggott marked his return with his first goal of the season in the first half with a rare Boro goal from a corner. In the second half Tuncay scored from another corner to put Middlesbrough 2–0 up, and complete the double over Portsmouth, along with their first two-goal winning margin since 1 September 2007 against Birmingham. The win also finally secured the side's safety from relegation.

The last game of the season saw Middlesbrough play Manchester City. They started in next season's kit. After quarter of an hour, City captain Richard Dunne brought down Tuncay in the box to give the home side their second penalty of the season, which saw Dunne sent off. Stewart Downing, who started every league game of the season, converted the penalty for his ninth goal of the season. Alves got his fourth of the season on 37 minutes. In the second half, Downing got another to make double figures for the season, and mark the first time Boro had scored more than two goals in one game since the last game of the previous season. It got better when Alves got his second just minutes later. Johnson made it five on 70 minutes. Anthony McMahon made his first appearance of the season coming on as a sub for Luke Young with 15 minutes to play. Rochemback scored a thirty-yard free kick to make it six with his first goal of the season. Jérémie Aliadière got another to make it seven. Elano got a consolation goal, before Afonso Alves completed a hat-trick to give Boro an emphatic 8–1 win. The game was the first time Boro had scored eight in a game since 1974, and the first time in the top flight since 1950. Alves' third goal was the 500th Boro goal in all competitions at the Riverside, and the 1,000th in the Premier League this season, as well as the club's 600th Premier League goal. It also saw the first time Boro registered five different goalscorers since 1939.

=== Results ===
Win Draw Loss

Note: Results are given with Middlesbrough score listed first. Man of the Match is according to mfc.co.uk.

| Game | Date | Venue | Opponent | Result F–A | Attendance | Boro Goalscorers | Man of the Match | Report |
|---|---|---|---|---|---|---|---|---|
| 1 | 11 August 2007 | H | Blackburn Rovers | 1–2 | 25,058 | Downing 31' | Boateng | Report |
| 2 | 15 August 2007 | A | Wigan Athletic | 0–1 | 14,007 | | Wheater | Report |
| 3 | 18 August 2007 | A | Fulham | 2–1 | 20,948 | Mido 55', Cattermole 88' | Schwarzer | Report |
| 4 | 26 August 2007 | H | Newcastle United | 2–2 | 28,875 | Mido 28', Arca 80' | Woodgate | Report |
| 5 | 1 September 2007 | H | Birmingham City | 2–0 | 22,920 | Wheater 12', Downing 37' | Aliadière | Report |
| 6 | 15 September 2007 | A | West Ham United | 0–3 | 34,361 | | Arca | Report |
| 7 | 22 September 2007 | H | Sunderland | 2–2 | 30,675 | Arca 15', Downing 67' | Wheater | Report |
| 8 | 30 September 2007 | A | Everton | 0–2 | 31,885 | | O'Neil | Report |
| 9 | 7 October 2007 | A | Manchester City | 1–3 | 40,438 | Hutchinson 89' | Riggott | Report |
| 10 | 20 October 2007 | H | Chelsea | 0–2 | 27,699 | | Downing | Report |
| 11 | 27 October 2007 | A | Manchester United | 1–4 | 75,720 | Aliadière 6' | Wheater | Report |
| 12 | 3 November 2007 | H | Tottenham Hotspur | 1–1 | 25,625 | Young 52' | Wheater | Report |
| 13 | 11 November 2007 | A | Bolton Wanderers | 0–0 | 17,624 | | Cattermole | Report |
| 14 | 24 November 2007 | H | Aston Villa | 0–3 | 23,900 | | O'Neil | Report |
| 15 | 1 December 2007 | A | Reading | 1–1 | 22,262 | Tuncay 83' | Boateng | Report |
| 16 | 9 December 2007 | H | Arsenal | 2–1 | 26,428 | Downing 4' (pen.), Tuncay 74' | Wheater | Report |
| 17 | 15 December 2007 | A | Derby County | 1–0 | 32,676 | Tuncay 38' | Tuncay | Report |
| 18 | 22 December 2007 | H | West Ham United | 1–2 | 26,007 | Wheater 40' | Boateng | Report |
| 19 | 26 December 2007 | A | Birmingham City | 0–3 | 24,094 | | Arca | Report |
| 20 | 29 December 2007 | A | Portsmouth | 1–0 | 20,089 | Tuncay 20' | Huth | Report |
| 21 | 1 January 2008 | H | Everton | 0–2 | 27,028 | | Woodgate | Report |
| 22 | 12 January 2008 | H | Liverpool | 1–1 | 33,035 | Boateng 26' | Wheater | Report |
| 23 | 19 January 2008 | A | Blackburn Rovers | 1–1 | 21,687 | Wheater 13' | Young | Report |
| 24 | 29 January 2008 | H | Wigan Athletic | 1–0 | 22,963 | Aliadière 19' | Downing | Report |
| 25 | 3 February 2008 | A | Newcastle United | 1–1 | 51,105 | Huth 87' | Arca | Report |
| 26 | 9 February 2008 | H | Fulham | 1–0 | 26,885 | Aliadière 11' | Aliadière | Report |
| 27 | 23 February 2008 | A | Liverpool | 2–3 | 43,612 | Tuncay 9', Downing 83' | Downing | Report |
| 28 | 1 March 2008 | H | Reading | 0–1 | 23,273 | | Downing | Report |
| 29 | 12 March 2008 | A | Aston Villa | 1–1 | 39,874 | Downing 23' | Wheater | Report |
| 30 | 15 March 2008 | A | Arsenal | 1–1 | 60,084 | Aliadière 25' | Wheater | Report |
| 31 | 22 March 2008 | H | Derby County | 1–0 | 25,649 | Tuncay 32' | Boateng | Report |
| 32 | 30 March 2008 | A | Chelsea | 0–1 | 39,993 | | Wheater | Report |
| 33 | 6 April 2008 | H | Manchester United | 2–2 | 33,952 | Alves (2) 35', 56' | Alves | Report |
| 34 | 12 April 2008 | A | Tottenham Hotspur | 1–1 | 36,092 | Downing 69' | Young | Report |
| 35 | 19 April 2008 | H | Bolton Wanderers | 0–1 | 25,037 | | Wheater | Report |
| 36 | 26 April 2008 | A | Sunderland | 2–3 | 45,059 | Tuncay 4', Alves 74' | Pogatetz | Report |
| 37 | 3 May 2008 | H | Portsmouth | 2–0 | 24,828 | Riggott 40', Tuncay 53' | Riggott | Report |
| 38 | 11 May 2008 | H | Manchester City | 8–1 | 27,613 | Downing (2) 16' (pen.), 58', Alves (3) 37', 60', 90', Johnson 70', Rochemback 80', Aliadière 85' | The full team | Report |

=== Classification ===
| Pos | Team | Pld | W | D | L | GF | GA | GD | Pts | Qualification or relegation |
|---|---|---|---|---|---|---|---|---|---|---|
| 11 | Tottenham Hotspur | 38 | 11 | 13 | 14 | 66 | 61 | +5 | 46 | Qualification for the UEFA Cup first round (Note: As League Cup winners) |
| 12 | Newcastle United | 38 | 11 | 10 | 17 | 45 | 65 | −20 | 43 | |
| 13 | Middlesbrough | 38 | 10 | 12 | 16 | 43 | 53 | −10 | 42 | |
| 14 | Wigan Athletic | 38 | 10 | 10 | 18 | 34 | 51 | −17 | 40 | |
| 15 | Sunderland | 38 | 11 | 6 | 21 | 36 | 59 | −23 | 39 | |

Source: Barclays Premier League
Rules for classification: 1) points; 2) goal difference; 3) number of goals scored.
For further information on European qualification see Premier League – Competition

=== League progress ===
This chart shows the league position of Middlesbrough F.C. over the course of the season. The green area represents the UEFA Champions League positions (positions 1 to 4), the yellow area represents what turned out to be the UEFA Cup position (positions 5) and the red area represents the relegation places (positions 18 to 20). The lowest position in the league that Middlesbrough reached during the course of the season was 18th, following the away draw at Reading on 1 December 2007, and their highest placing was 10th, after the fifth game.

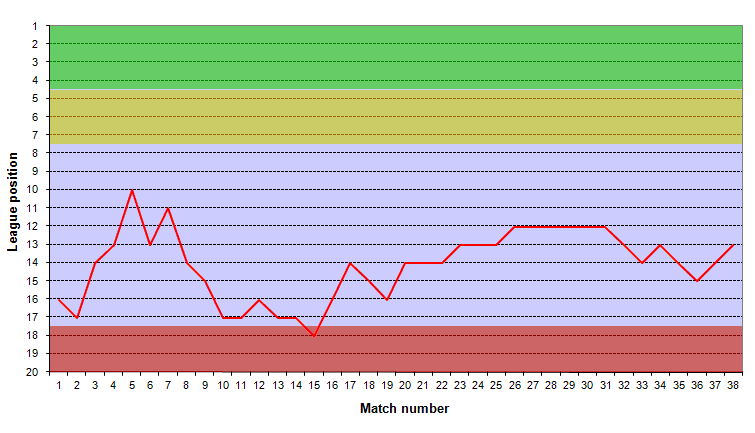

=== Summary ===
| Overall | | | | | | | | Home | | | | | | Away | | | | | |
| Pld | W | D | L | GF | GA | GD | Pts | W | D | L | GF | GA | GD | W | D | L | GF | GA | GD |
|---|---|---|---|---|---|---|---|---|---|---|---|---|---|---|---|---|---|---|---|
| 38 | 10 | 12 | 16 | 43 | 53 | −10 | 42 | 7 | 5 | 7 | 27 | 23 | +4 | 3 | 7 | 9 | 16 | 30 | −14 |

Last updated: 2008-05-01.
Source: "2007–08 Barclays Premier League Table". MFC.co.uk. Archived from the original on 7 August 2008.

=== Statistics ===
- Highest home attendance: 33,952 (vs Manchester United, 6 April 2008)
- Lowest home attendance: 22,920 (vs Birmingham City, 1 September 2007)
- Most man of the match awards: David Wheater (10) – does not include "the full team" award from Manchester City game
- Longest run without a loss: 5 games (12 January 2008 to 9 February 2008)
- Longest run without a win: 10 games (15 September 2007 to 1 December 2007)
- Longest run without a point: 4 games (30 September 2007 to 27 October 2007)
- Doubles won: 3 (Derby County, Fulham, Portsmouth)
- Doubles lost: 3 (Chelsea, Everton, West Ham United)

== League Cup ==
In the Carling Cup, Middlesbrough eased past Northampton Town in the second round with goals from Rochemback and Lee Dong-Gook's first Boro goal, setting up an away tie at Tottenham Hotspur. At Tottenham, Mohamed Shawky and Graeme Owens made their first senior appearances for Boro, with Tom Craddock making only his second, as part of an injury ravaged side devoid of first team players in both attack and defence. Despite holding on for three-quarters of the game Middlesbrough eventually went down to a 2–0 defeat.

=== Results ===
Win Loss

Note: Results are given with Middlesbrough score listed first. Man of the Match is according to mfc.co.uk.

| Round | Date | Venue | Opponent | Result F–A | Attendance | Boro Goalscorers | Man of the Match | Report |
|---|---|---|---|---|---|---|---|---|
| 2 | 29 August 2007 | H | Northampton Town | 2–0 | 11,686 | Rochemback 55', Lee 66' | Rochemback | Report |
| 3 | 26 September 2007 | A | Tottenham Hotspur | 0–2 | 30,084 | | Jones | Report |

== FA Cup ==
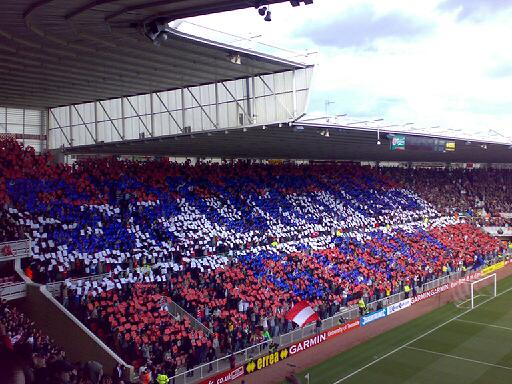
The card display stating "Sporting Glory" displayed prior to the match with Cardiff City.

Middlesbrough faced Bristol City away in the third round of the FA Cup, the same tie they faced in the fourth round the previous year. Prior to the match, many pundits were predicting that the game could see a shock result with Bristol City winning. After 18 minutes it seemed they might be right as Boro conceded a sloppy goal to Liam Fontaine, but the Premier League side fought back, with goals from Stewart Downing and David Wheater giving Boro a 2–1 victory.

The fourth round saw Boro again drawn away, this time versus League Two strugglers Mansfield Town. Southgate named a slightly weakened side for the game; live on BBC's Match of the Day – Adam Johnson, Lee Dong-Gook and Lee Cattermole earning starting places, with Stewart Downing, George Boateng and a returning Mido on the bench. Dong-Gook got his second Boro goal following a corner from Johnson on 17 minutes. Huth was lucky not to be sent off for a high boot into the stomach of Michael Boulding. Mido came on for the final twenty minutes. After being put under massive pressure, Middlesbrough sealed the victory, following a cruel own goal from captain Jake Buxton.

For the fifth round, Middlesbrough were again drawn away, this time to Sheffield United, managed by former Boro boss Bryan Robson. Robson had been sacked by the time the game came around, and the game was again live on the BBC. The tie ended up needing a replay following a 0–0 draw.

Once again televised, the replay saw Afonso Alves make his first start. The game remained goalless at the end of 90 minutes and so progressed into extra time. A Paddy Kenny own goal after 114 minutes of play gave Boro the win and a home tie to Cardiff City in the sixth round.

With Manchester United and Chelsea knocked out the previous day, Boro had an excellent chance in the FA Cup. Before the match, the fans in the North Stand held up a card display with the words "Sporting Glory" covering the stand, in reference to a comment from chairman Steve Gibson that stated the club were not in competition for the money but for sporting glory. However, in the game, Middlesbrough were totally outplayed by Cardiff, conceding the first goal after nine minutes. There was an apparent handball by a Cardiff player in the box, but nothing was given, and the ball fell to another Cardiff player to score the goal. They conceded a second 13 minutes later, ending up being defeated 2–0.

=== Results ===
Win Draw Loss

Note: Results are given with Middlesbrough score listed first. Man of the Match is according to mfc.co.uk.

| Round | Date | Venue | Opponent | Result F–A | Attendance | Boro Goalscorers | Man of the Match | Report |
|---|---|---|---|---|---|---|---|---|
| 3 | 5 January 2008 | A | Bristol City | 2–1 | 15,895 | Downing 37', Wheater 72' | Wheater | Report |
| 4 | 26 January 2008 | A | Mansfield Town | 2–0 | 6,258 | Lee 17', Buxton 87' (o.g.) | Huth | Report |
| 5 | 17 February 2008 | A | Sheffield United | 0–0 | 22,210 | | Mido | Report |
| 5R | 27 February 2008 | H | Sheffield United | 1–0 | 28,101 | Kenny 114' (o.g.) | Downing | Report |
| 6 | 8 March 2008 | H | Cardiff City | 0–2 | 32,898 | | Not awarded | Report |

== Staff ==
In July 2007, former Hartlepool United boss Martin Scott was added to the youth team coaching staff.

On 2 October 2007, Middlesbrough's Head of Operations Terry Tasker, a member of the executive team, died. Neil Bausor joined the club as new Chief Operating Officer later in the season. Graham Fordy, the club's Head of Commercial, having previously also been a non-executive director following the club's liquidation scare in 1986, left the club by mutual consent on 1 November 2007.

It was confirmed on 19 November 2007 that goalkeeping coach Paul Barron had left the club to take up a similar role with North East rivals Newcastle United. Former Middlesbrough goalkeeper and current youth team goalkeeping coach Stephen Pears was promoted to replace Barron.

Former Boro legend David Mills and former first team coach and Sky Sports pundit Gordon McQueen returned to Middlesbrough to expand the recruitment department in April, under chief scout Dave Leadbeater, and alongside the academy recruitment team.

Key: Held role for full season Appointed to role mid-season Left role mid-season

Executive members
| Role | Person |
|---|---|
| Chairman | (England) Steve Gibson |
| Chief Executive | (England) Keith Lamb |
| Chief Operating Officer | (England) Terry Tasker |
| Chief Operating Officer | (England) Neil Bausor |
| Chief Financial Officer | (England) Alan Bage |

Senior team management
| Role | Person |
|---|---|
| Manager | (England) Gareth Southgate |
| Assistant manager | (England) Malcolm Crosby |
| First team coach | (England) Colin Cooper |
| First team coach | (England) Steve Harrison |
| Reserve team coach | (England) Steve Agnew |
| Goalkeeping coach | (England) Paul Barron |
| Goalkeeping coach | (England) Stephen Pears |

Academy team management
| Role | Person |
|---|---|
| Academy manager | (England) Dave Parnaby |
| Academy coach | (England) Martin Scott |
| Academy coach | (England) Craig Hignett |
| Academy coach | (England) Kevin Scott |
| Goalkeeping coach | (England) Stephen Pears |

Medical
| Role | Person |
|---|---|
| Head of medical | (England) Grant Downie |
| Head of sports science | (England) Chris Barnes |
| Sports therapist | (England) Nick Allamby |
| First team physio | (England) Chris Moseley |

Recruitment
| Role | Person |
|---|---|
| Head of senior recruitment | (England) Dave Leadbeater |
| First team scout | (Scotland) Gordon McQueen |
| First team scout | (England) David Mills |
| Head of academy recruitment | (England) Ron Bone |

== Other events ==
=== Premier League All Stars ===
In late September, the Premier League All Stars tournament (part of the "Premier League Creating Chances" campaign) took place. The Middlesbrough representative team won, beating West Ham United's side 3–1 in the final.

The squad for the tournament was:

Goalkeeper: Jim Platt (Captain)
Legends: Mikkel Beck, Craig Hignett, Bernie Slaven
Celebrities: Alistair Griffin, Mark Stobbart, Gary Havelock
Fans: Julian McGuire (IT Consultant), Tony Rovardi (ice cream cone manufacturer), Steven Aithwaite (sports and science lecturer)

=== Reserves ===
The Middlesbrough Reserves finished seventh out of ten in the Premier Reserve League North during the 2007–08 season, with the following record:

| Overall | | | | | | | | Home | | | | | | Away | | | | | |
| Pld | W | D | L | GF | GA | GD | Pts | W | D | L | GF | GA | GD | W | D | L | GF | GA | GD |
|---|---|---|---|---|---|---|---|---|---|---|---|---|---|---|---|---|---|---|---|
| 18 | 5 | 7 | 6 | 23 | 26 | −3 | 22 | 2 | 5 | 2 | 11 | 12 | −1 | 3 | 2 | 4 | 12 | 14 | −2 |

Key: Pld = Matches played; Pts = Points; W = Matches won; D = Matches drawn; L = Matches lost; GF = Goals for; GA = Goals against; GD = Goal difference

The team also retained the North Riding Senior Cup, beating York City 2–0 in the final.

=== Youth teams ===
The Middlesbrough Academy (U18s) side were knocked out of the FA Youth Cup in the Fourth Round. In the 2007–08 Premier Academy League the team finished fourth out of ten teams in Academy Group D.

The Under-15s side lifted the Nike Trophy in April in the tournament held over four days at the University of Warwick, beating the U15 sides of Reading, Tottenham Hotspur, Derby County, West Ham United, Manchester City and Sheffield United to lift the trophy. They go to the finals of the tournament held in Manchester in August.

=== Marketing award nomination ===
Middlesbrough Football Club was shortlisted for the Sports Industry Awards in the category of Best Use of Digital Media in Sport, along with Nike, Virgin Media, The Football League, Emirates and Land Rover. The award was in relation to the season ticket video campaign featuring David Wheater.

=== End-of-season awards ===
David Wheater picked up both the Official Supporters' Club's Young Player of the Year and the John Ovington Community Player of the Year awards, as well as being named Players' Young Player of the Year and the Official Garmin Player of the Year as voted for by the fans. Stewart Downing was Middlesbrough Official Supporters Club's Player of the Year and Player's Player of the Year. Goalkeeper Mark Schwarzer was given a special award recognising his outstanding contributions on and off the field over the past 11 years.
