= Teesside Live =

Newspaper covering Teesside, Northern England

TeessideLive
- Type: Daily regional newspaper
- Format: Compact/Tabloid
- Owner: Reach plc
- Editor: Neil Hodgkinson
- Founded: 1869
- Headquarters: Hudson Quays, Middlesbrough
- Circulation: 5,640 (as of 2023)
- ISSN: 2056-6131
- Website: www.gazettelive.co.uk

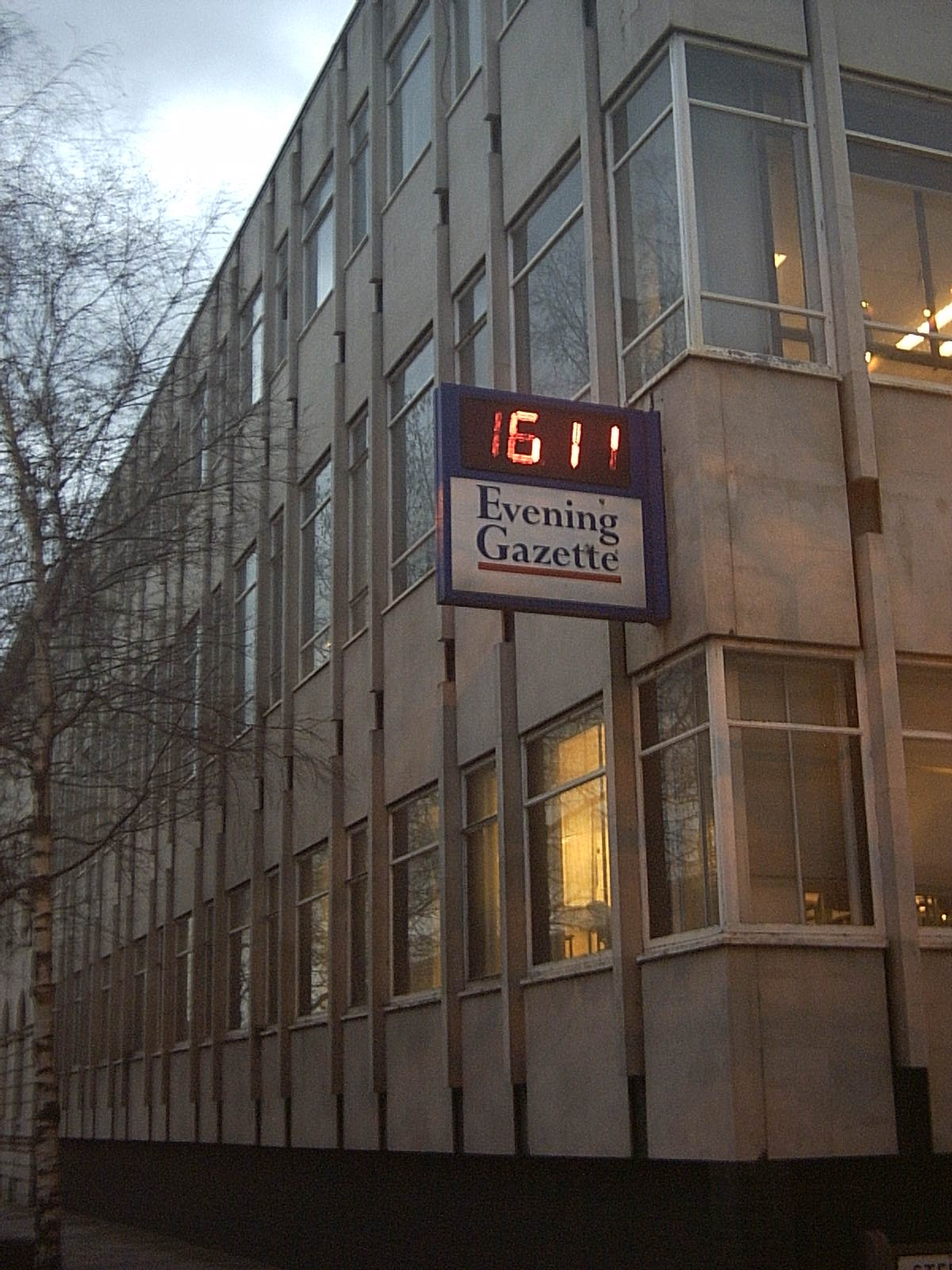
The Gazette Building in Middlesbrough, England

TeessideLive is a regional news website serving the Teesside area of England. The website feeds The Gazette daily newspaper and the Sunday Sun, England's best-selling regional Sunday newspaper. Formerly known as Teesside Gazette, the website, mobile app and social media accounts changed to TeessideLive on 5 June 2018.

The Gazette is the most popular daily newspaper in Teesside, and has been an integral part of life in the area since 1869, when it was founded as the North-Eastern Daily Gazette by the Scot, and eventual Liberal Member of Parliament for Aston Manor, Hugh Gilzean Reid. It was also at this time, that a first premises were established on Zetland Road, Middlesbrough. Historical copies of the Daily Gazette, dating back to 1870, are available to search and view in digitised form at The British Newspaper Archive. Later The Gazette Media Company Ltd who also publish the free Herald & Post newspaper.

The Teesside Gazette occupied the Gazette building on Borough Road in the centre of Middlesbrough for almost 80 years; and in April 2018, it moved to a new premises on Hudson Quays, Middlehaven. This houses the editorial staff as well as various operational departments such as advertising and newspaper sales. There is a further Gazette Media Company site on the Riverside Industrial Estate which houses a printing press.

Teesside Gazette changed the title of its cover page from "Evening Gazette" to "The Gazette" in 2014 after the company began releasing the newspaper to newsagents on mornings instead of evenings as it had done previously. It mainly provides local news, but also covers national, international and sports news as well as having various supplements relating to lifestyle, business, and events.

== "The Pink" ==
Many local newspapers in the mid-20th century produced a special sports edition on Saturday evening. Before football results were widely available on television and radio such editions were the source of results for players of the football pools. Serious players needed the results as soon as possible since, on afternoons where there were relatively few matches ending in a draw, the payouts from the pools would be large and claims would have to be made quickly, typically by telegram. While the regular evening edition typically "went to bed" in mid-afternoon, if not earlier, the sports edition had to be on news stands as soon as possible after the conclusion of football games across the country. Most games started at 3 p.m. and concluded around 4:45 pm. The sports edition was usually available by 6 pm. It was popular with newsagents who capitalised on the rush of customers its appearance generated to sell cigarettes and other "impulse buys". The edition was small compared to the regular edition, often as few as three broadsheets, making twelve pages when folded. Plenty of space was devoted to advertising, as well as lists of results and short descriptions of games.

In the 1960s The Gazette began printing the sports edition on pink newsprint. Soon, the edition began to be known as "the Pink". To encourage people to buy the sports edition at a time when television was affecting its sales, competitions were run "In the Pink" with cash prizes.

In a similar vein, a sports newspaper published in Sheffield is known as the "Green 'Un" after the green newsprint used.

== See also ==
- Gazette Media Centre
