= Tony McMahon =

English footballer

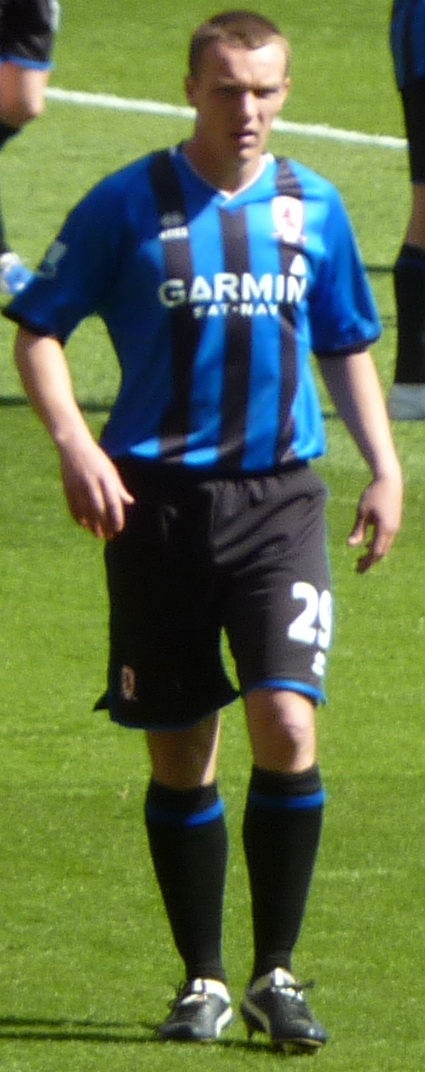

Personal information
- Full name: Anthony McMahon
- Date of birth: 24 March 1986 (age 40)
- Place of birth: Bishop Auckland, England
- Positions: Defender; midfielder

Team information
- Current team: West Bromwich Albion (first team coach)

Youth career
- Barnard Castle
- Byers Green
- 1998–2004: Middlesbrough

Senior career*
Years	Team	Apps	(Gls)
2004–2012	Middlesbrough	119	(3)
2007	→ Blackpool (loan)	2	(0)
2008	→ Sheffield Wednesday (loan)	15	(1)
2012–2014	Sheffield United	61	(2)
2014	→ Blackpool (loan)	2	(0)
2014–2015	Blackpool	48	(1)
2015	→ Bradford City (loan)	8	(1)
2015–2018	Bradford City	103	(11)
2018–2019	Oxford United	10	(0)
2019	→ Scunthorpe United (loan)	14	(1)
2020–2021	Darlington	7	(0)
Total		361	(20)

International career
2001–2002	England U16	6	(0)
2002–2003	England U17	5	(0)
2005	England U19	4	(0)
- * Club domestic league appearances and goals

Anthony McMahon (born 24 March 1986) is an English football coach and former player who played as a right back.

Born in Bishop Auckland, County Durham, McMahon started his playing career with Middlesbrough, with whom he spent eight seasons, including loan spells with Blackpool and Sheffield Wednesday, before moving to Sheffield United in 2012. McMahon was capped at international youth level, playing in the 2003 Under-17 and 2005 Under-19 European Football Championships.

McMahon coached in Middlesbrough's academy, and headed Darlington's academy while also registered as a player, before taking up a coaching position with Scunthorpe United in 2021.

== Club career ==
=== Middlesbrough ===
McMahon played football for Barnard Castle and Byers Green before joining Middlesbrough at the age of 12. He took up a three-year scholarship in 2002, and was a member of the Middlesbrough team that lost to Manchester United in the final of the 2002–03 FA Youth Cup. He signed professional terms in 2003, and captained the youth team – which included the likes of Andrew Taylor, David Wheater and Adam Johnson – to the 2003–04 FA Youth Cup title.

He was increasingly involved with the first team, and on 3 October 2004, after Franck Queudrue failed a late fitness test, the 18-year-old McMahon made his senior debut in the starting eleven for a 1–1 Premier League draw with Manchester United at Old Trafford. He made a European debut on 21 October in the UEFA Cup group stage away win at Egaleo, and continued in the team well into December, mostly as a starter, taking his appearance tally to 14. His performances earned plaudits from Match of the Day pundit Alan Hansen, Middlesbrough team-mate Ray Parlour, and manager Steve McClaren, who said that "If anyone can handle Old Trafford in the way in which Tony did on his debut, then we know that he can be relied on in the future. He did well again at Blackburn and, while he is still very young, he can have a bright future if he continues to learn and make progress." After Boro's injury crisis eased with the return of more established defenders in Michael Reiziger and Stuart Parnaby, McMahon played little in the second half of the season. In February 2005, his contract was extended to run until June 2008. In mid-March, he started in the 1–0 away defeat against Sporting CP in the last 16 of the UEFA Cup that eliminated Middlesbrough from the competition, but suffered knee damage that required surgery and six weeks' rehabilitation. McMahon made 19 appearances during the season, and was voted the club's Players' Young Player of the Year.

McMahon's next three seasons were ruined by injury. He dislocated a shoulder during a reserve match in August, returned to reserve-team action five months later, and did not appear for the first team for another four weeks, when he played the first half of a fifth-round FA Cup tie. He lasted less than ten minutes of the Premier League visit to Charlton Athletic before a poor tackle by Bryan Hughes inflicted medial ligament damage to his knee that kept him out for another six weeks, and he played just twice more at the end of the season.

Under the management of former Middlesbrough defender Gareth Southgate, McMahon was one of several young players with first-team experience who struggled for game time in the first few weeks of the 2006–07 season. Apart from one League Cup tie, he had played only reserve-team football by 19 October 2006, when he broke his leg during a match against Liverpool's reserves. He returned to reserve-team action after four months, and was included on the bench for a Premier League match in April, but an injury sustained in training, initially described as "a knock" that was not thought serious, but in fact another broken leg, not only put an end to his comeback but also delayed the start of his 2007–08 campaign.

Having returned to fitness with the reserves, McMahon joined Championship club Blackpool on 10 November 2007 on a month's loan. He made his debut the same day, and "fitted in well" as Blackpool beat Scunthorpe United 1–0 at Bloomfield Road. Ten minutes into his second match, he injured a hamstring and did not return to action until well into the new year. His only first-team outing was for 15 minutes in the last game of the season, an 8–1 victory over Manchester City. At the end of the season, he signed a one-year contract extension.

McMahon joined Championship club Sheffield Wednesday on an initial month's loan on 21 August 2008. Although signed after their right-back Richard Hinds broke his leg, it was the quality of his passing in attack that particularly impressed manager Brian Laws about his debut. McMahon was selected in the Championship Team of the Week after his performance against Watford on 13 September, and his loan was extended to the three-month maximum. He was sent off for a bad tackle on Barnsley's Rob Kozluk on 21 October, and was recalled by Middlesbrough to serve the resulting three-match ban with them. He returned to Wednesday on 3 November for the last month of his loan, and in his 15th and final appearance he scored his first senior goal: from an inswinging corner, "McMahon arrived in the six-yard box in the centre of the goal to power a header" past Norwich City's goalkeeper to level the scores at 1–1 in a match that Wednesday won 3–2.

With Justin Hoyte unavailable after surgery, McMahon made his first Middlesbrough appearance of the season in a 1–1 draw with Arsenal on 13 December. He performed well, and was involved in Boro's goal. He was more or less a regular in the side as injury cover, for Emmanuel Pogatetz and Andrew Taylor as well as Hoyte, as the team faced an ultimately unsuccessful struggle against relegation to the Championship. With his contract due to expire at the end of the season, McMahon believed his performances were proving his long-term fitness: "I've had a full season now of not being injured. I went out on loan, played well and then came back and got back in the team. I was then out of the team for a while but now I'm back in and I'm getting my head down and working hard and hopefully everything will fall into place." Manager and club concurred, and McMahon signed a three-year contract extension.

Selected ahead of Hoyte by Southgate to start the opening match of the 2009–10 season, a goalless draw with Sheffield United, McMahon's performance earned him a place in the Football League Team of the Week. The team continued to be sound defensively and McMahon continued at right back until a 5–0 loss at home to West Bromwich Albion saw him dropped in favour of Hoyte. McMahon played in the next three matches before returning to the substitutes' bench for a month, but after a further couple of months in the side he was discovered to have a stress fracture of the foot that kept him out until several weeks into the 2010–11 season. McMahon played regularly throughout the remainder of the season, mainly as a starter, scored twice with free kicks, including Middlesbrough's opener in a 3–2 win at Millwall, and was involved in both goals in a 2–1 win against Derby County in March that took Middlesbrough six points clear of the relegation places.

That began a run of league games that lasted from March to mid-October with only one defeat, in which McMahon featured regularly. In the second half of the 2011–12 season he was mainly selected on the bench, but still managed 39 appearances in all competitions. He made clear he did not want to leave the club, and his involvement with the local area was reflected in his Community Player of the Year award, but failure to reach the play-offs meant pay cuts would be necessary, and although Middlesbrough made him an offer, he did not accept.

=== Sheffield United ===
McMahon signed a two-year deal with League One club Sheffield United at the end of July 2012. He was given the same shirt number, 29, as he had at Middlesbrough. He quickly established himself in the promotion-chasing side, and started every match as they remained unbeaten in the League until mid-November, when hamstring problems meant he only played an hour's football in the next month. McMahon scored his first goals on 22 December with two 30-yard (27 m) free kicks to secure a 2–0 win over Crawley Town that took United to the top of the table; the second free kick was voted United's Goal of the Season. Despite an ongoing Achilles tendon problem, he continued as a regular, apart for a two-match suspension for ten yellow cards, until the injury worsened in April. He missed the play-offs, in which United lost to Yeovil Town in the semi-final, and although there was no need for surgery, he still missed most of the following pre-season.

On 17 August 2013, McMahon made his first appearance of the 2013–14 season, starting in a 1–1 draw with Colchester United, and was almost ever-present in the starting eleven until 24 January, when he left for Championship club Blackpool as part of an initial "loan-swap" with another full back, Bob Harris. According to manager Nigel Clough, "We have had to sacrifice Tony McMahon to get the deal done but, fortunately, we have managed to bring in John Brayford, which gives us further defensive options. We were not looking to move Tony on but with his contract up in the summer this gives him a chance to impress at Championship level."

=== Blackpool ===
Despite not having trained with his new team-mates, McMahon made a second debut for Blackpool the next day in a 1–1 draw with Doncaster Rovers, and the move was made permanent a few days later. Apart from a two-match suspension, he remained in the starting eleven, contributing to the team narrowly avoiding relegation and earning himself the Wonga Player of the Month award for March.

In June 2014, McMahon became new Blackpool manager José Riga's first signing when he agreed a contract for one year with the option of a second. He was in select company: with less than two weeks to go before the start of the season, Blackpool had only eight contracted players, all outfielders. Under McMahon's captaincy, the team achieved a first win on 6 October against Cardiff City, He scored his first goal in the next match, a defeat to Huddersfield Town, and received his fifth yellow card in the next. After serving a one-match ban, McMahon was sent off after 41 minutes of the visit to Fulham on 5 November for "aiming a petulant kick at Hugo Rodallega". At the time, Blackpool led 2–0, but with only ten men were unable to retain the lead, and manager Lee Clark was angered and disappointed at his captain's behaviour.

He returned to the team after his three-match suspension, initially as a substitute, and soon regained his starting place. He continued to collect yellow cards, and was serving a two-match ban in March 2015 when he was reported to have asked to leave Blackpool.

=== Bradford City ===
McMahon signed on loan for League One club Bradford City on 27 March 2015 until the end of the season. He made his debut the next day as a late substitute, scored his first goal the following week, and started the last four matches of the season, in which Bradford City remained unbeaten.

Blackpool were relegated at the end of the 2014–15 season, and McMahon was one of a lengthy list of players released. He signed a two-year contract with Bradford City on 3 July. He lost time in the early part of the season to a virus, but was soon able to establish himself in the side, despite his right-back position of choice being occupied by captain Stephen Darby. McMahon's versatility – able to play at "right back, left back, pretty much anywhere across the back four and in midfield", according to manager Phil Parkinson – added to his ability with free kicks and corners and his leadership qualities, made him easy to select. His first goal of the season came in the FA Cup in November – he ended the season with six, including one in the first leg of the play-off semi-final, which Bradford City lost 4–2 on aggregate to Millwall – and he provided twelve assists. He made 49 appearances over the season, all but one of which were in the starting eleven.

With Darby injured at the start of the 2016–17 season, McMahon returned to right-back and stood in as captain. Ten days after performing the unusual feat of scoring twice in a penalty shoot-out as Bradford City lost 11–10 to Accrington Stanley, McMahon scored two penalties in a 3–1 win against Coventry City before tearing a thigh muscle that kept him out until Christmas. He continued in the starting eleven, and scored twice in the penultimate match of the season, a 3–0 win against AFC Wimbledon that confirmed Bradford City's qualification for the play-offs. Rory McArdle scored the only goal of the semi-final against Fleetwood Town from McMahon's corner, but they lost in the final to a late Steve Morison goal for Millwall. With his contract due to expire and amid interest from clubs including Bolton Wanderers, Blackburn Rovers and Preston North End, McMahon delayed accepting an offer to stay with Bradford City, but in early July, he signed for another year.

McMahon was frequently involved in City's goals, and the first of his own, in a 1–0 win against Northampton Town, was voted League One Goal of the Month for September. The nomination read how "with almost no run-up, McMahon timed his clip over the Northampton wall into the top corner to perfection". He made his 100th appearance for the club against Doncaster Rovers on 30 September. Injuries and illness disrupted his season in December and January, during which the club turned down a bid for his services from Scunthorpe United. He returned to the team in February and was a fixture in the starting line-up for the rest of the season. McMahon was released when his contract expired, after playing 128 matches and scoring 14 goals in just over three seasons.

=== Oxford United ===
In June 2018, McMahon signed a two-year deal with Oxford United of League One. He began the season in the starting eleven for two successive defeats, and his place was threatened by the poor start, competition and injury. He started six matches in October, in which he helped the side keep three consecutive clean sheets, before a cracked rib, aggravated by playing on for 15 minutes after sustaining the injury, put an end to his Oxford United career.

After the death of his father, and with his family living in the north-east of England, McMahon was keen to return nearer home. He was loaned to League One rivals Scunthorpe United in January for the remainder of the season. The club's manager, Stuart McCall, had been in charge of Bradford City a year earlier when Scunthorpe had tried and failed to sign him. McMahon soon established himself in the starting eleven as right back of choice. Solid in defence, he exerted a calming influence on those around him, and was considered one of their best crossers of a ball. A hamstring injury in April was to keep him out for the rest of the season, and the Grimsby Telegraph suggested that the loss of such qualities would be "a huge blow". In his absence, Scunthorpe's relegation was confirmed.

Still hoping to find a club nearer home, McMahon remained with Oxford United during pre-season, but was released from his contract by mutual consent on 3 September 2019.

=== Later career ===
McMahon spent the 2019–20 season taking his coaching qualifications and coaching in Middlesbrough's Academy. On 27 August 2020, McMahon joined National League North club Darlington in a dual role, as player and head of academy. He made seven league appearances and eight in cup competitions before the season was ended early because of the COVID-19 pandemic.

== Coaching career ==
At the end of the 2020–21 season, he took up a coaching position at one of his former clubs, Scunthorpe United. McMahon departed his role as assistant manager alongside the sacking of Keith Hill on 30 August 2022 with the club sat second bottom of the National League.

On 23 May 2023, he was confirmed as York City 's Assistant Manager having been on the coaching staff under Mikey Morton. In September 2024, he was appointed Director of Football. He departed the club in July 2025.

In June 2026, he joined EFL Championship side West Bromwich Albion as part of James Morrison's backroom staff.

== International career ==
McMahon was called up to the England national under-16 football team in July 2001, and he went on to make six appearances. His England U16 debut was against Scotland U16.

He was called up by England U17 for the Nordic International Tournament in 2002. He went on to make five appearances for the England U17.

After two years without representing England at any level, McMahon was included in the England U19 squad for a friendly match in January 2005 and made his England U19 debut on 9 February 2005, in a 1–1 draw with Belgium. He was first-choice right back for the U19s alongside Wheater, Taylor and James Morrison at the 2005 European Championships, where they lost to France in the final.

== Career statistics ==
As of end of 2020–21 season

Appearances and goals by club, season and competition
Club	Season	League			FA Cup		League Cup		Other		Total	
Club	Season	Division	Apps	Goals	Apps	Goals	Apps	Goals	Apps	Goals	Apps	Goals
Middlesbrough	2004–05	Premier League	13	0	1	0	1	0	4 (Note: Appearances in UEFA Cup)	0	19	0
Middlesbrough	2005–06	Premier League	3	0	1	0	0	0	0	0	4	0
Middlesbrough	2006–07	Premier League	0	0	0	0	1	0	—		1	0
Middlesbrough	2007–08	Premier League	1	0	0	0	0	0	—		1	0
Middlesbrough	2008–09	Premier League	13	0	2	0	—		—		15	0
Middlesbrough	2009–10	Championship	21	0	1	0	1	0	—		23	0
Middlesbrough	2010–11	Championship	34	2	1	0	0	0	—		35	2
Middlesbrough	2011–12	Championship	34	1	2	0	3	0	—		39	1
Middlesbrough	Total		119	3	8	0	6	0	4	0	137	3
Blackpool (loan)	2007–08	Championship	2	0	—		—		—		2	0
Sheffield Wednesday (loan)	2008–09	Championship	15	1	0	0	—		—		15	1
Sheffield United	2012–13	League One	38	2	3	1	1	0	0	0	42	3
Sheffield United	2013–14	League One	23	0	2	0	0	0	1 (Note: Appearances in Football League Trophy)	0	26	0
Sheffield United	Total		61	2	5	1	1	0	1	0	68	3
Blackpool	2013–14	Championship	18	0	—		—		—		18	0
Blackpool	2014–15	Championship	32	1	1	0	0	0	—		33	1
Blackpool	Total		50	1	1	0	0	0	—		51	1
Bradford City (loan)	2014–15	League One	8	1	—		—		—		8	1
Bradford City	2015–16	League One	40	4	5	1	1	0	3 (Note: One appearance in Football League Trophy, two appearances and one goal in League One play-offs)	1	49	6
Bradford City	2016–17	League One	25	6	0	0	1	0	5 (Note: Two appearances in Football League Trophy, three appearances in League One play-offs)	0	31	6
Bradford City	2017–18	League One	38	1	1	0	1	0	0	0	40	1
Bradford City	Total		111	12	6	1	3	0	8	1	128	14
Oxford United	2018–19	League One	10	1	1	0	0	0	2 (Note: Appearances in EFL Trophy)	1	13	2
Oxford United	2018–19	League One	0	0	—		0	0	—		0	0
Oxford United	Total		10	1	1	0	0	0	2	1	13	2
Scunthorpe United	2018–19	League One	14	1	—		—		—		14	1
Darlington	2020–21	National League North	7	0	4	0	—		4 (Note: Appearances in FA Trophy)	0	15	0
Career total			389	21	25	2	10	0	19	2	443	25

== Personal life ==
McMahon was born in Bishop Auckland, County Durham, and lived in nearby Evenwood with his parents, Tony and Tracey, a sister and a brother. He attended Evenwood Primary School and Staindrop Comprehensive School, where he met his future wife, Lynsey Matthews, whom he married in 2012. Their first child, a son, was born in 2009, and they also have a daughter.

His father was a cricketer. At one point, he played cricket, playing for Evenwood Cricket Club and was expected to follow his father's footsteps. McMahon reflected on playing cricket, saying: "I played a lot of cricket when I was younger. I played against Australia when I was 15 and that was brilliant. It's really stayed in my mind because you don't get the chance to do something like that every day. I loved cricket and still do, but I only ever played when I wasn't playing football. I think Durham were interested in me at the time, but my football career took off before they were able to do anything about it. People have told me I could have made it in county cricket, but once things started to happen for me in football, it was never an option."

While progressing through the Middlesbrough's academy, he spent three years at college, studying BTEC National Diploma in Sports Science and passed the course. Early in his Middlesbrough's career, McMahon launched Future Goals, which is a new football and fitness programme for children and their parents to improve their lifestyles. It was revealed in The Telegraph and Argus article that McMahon plan on studying coaching once he retired from professional football.
