= Stuart Parnaby =

English footballer (born 1982)

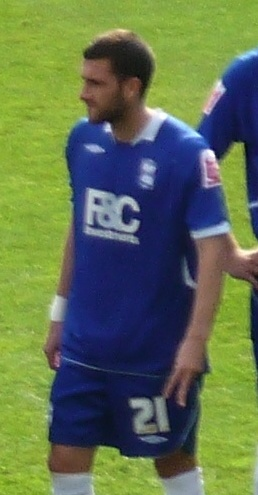
- Parnaby playing for Birmingham City in 2008

Personal information
- Full name: Stuart Parnaby
- Date of birth: 19 July 1982 (age 44)
- Place of birth: Durham, County Durham, England
- Height: 5 ft 10 in (1.78 m)
- Position: Right-back

Youth career
- 199?–2000: Middlesbrough

Senior career*
Years	Team	Apps	(Gls)
2000–2007	Middlesbrough	91	(2)
2000	→ Halifax Town (loan)	6	(0)
2007–2011	Birmingham City	47	(0)
2012–2014	Middlesbrough	17	(0)
2014–2015	Hartlepool United	5	(0)
Total		166	(2)

International career
1998–1999	England U16	11	(1)
2000–2001	England U18	8	(1)
2002	England U20	4	(1)
2002–2003	England U21	4	(0)
- * Club domestic league appearances and goals

Stuart Parnaby (born 19 July 1982) is an English former professional footballer who played as a right-back in the Football League and Premier League for Halifax Town, Middlesbrough, Birmingham City and Hartlepool United. He was most recently the assistant manager at National League North club Spennymoor Town.

Parnaby graduated from Middlesbrough's academy, playing on loan for Halifax Town in 2000 before making his Middlesbrough debut in 2002. He went on to make more than 100 appearances for Middlesbrough's first team and was part of the team that finished as runners-up in the 2005–06 UEFA Cup. Parnaby joined Birmingham City in 2007 and helped them win promotion to the Premier League as runners-up in the 2008–09 Championship. He was an unused substitute as Birmingham beat Arsenal at Wembley Stadium in the 2011 League Cup Final. After four years with the club, a time disrupted by injury, he was released at the end of the 2010–11 season. After a year without a club, Parnaby rejoined Middlesbrough in 2012 but struggled with injuries before leaving two years later. He spent a season with Hartlepool United and then retired in 2015.

== Club career ==
=== Middlesbrough ===
==== Early life and career ====
Stuart Parnaby was born on 19 July 1982 in Durham, County Durham, and grew up supporting Middlesbrough F.C. He joined Middlesbrough's academy when he was 10, where his father, Dave Parnaby, was academy director. Parnaby made his first-team debut for Middlesbrough in September 2000 in a League Cup match against Macclesfield Town. The next month, he was loaned to Halifax Town, during which time he played six games and won the Third Division Player of the Month award before returning to his parent club in December. He did not make any more appearances for Middlesbrough in the 2000–01 season.

Parnaby did not feature in the 2001–02 season due to two serious injuries to his hip, both of which required surgery. Nevertheless, he signed a new contract with the club in March 2002, lasing until June 2004. Having recovered from his injuries by July 2002, he felt he could make his return in the first team.

The 2002–03 season saw Parnaby sidelined until he made his Premier League debut on 26 October 2002, in a 2–2 draw against Leeds United. Following his debut, he had a run in the first team before a tear on his hamstring kept him sidelined for weeks. Parnaby went on to make 23 appearances for the club in 2002–03. As a result, he was awarded the Supporters' Club Young Player of the Year award. He was also rewarded with a new contract with the club in March, lasting until June 2007.

==== 2003–2007 ====
Parnaby featured in the first four matches of the 2003–04 season. However, during the season, he found himself struggling to feature in the team after a four-month layoff for a knee injury. He made his return as a substitute for Franck Queudrue in a 1–0 home loss against Manchester United on 28 December 2003. However, Parnaby's appearances were limited towards the end of the 2003–04 season through back and hamstring injuries, as well as Danny Mills, who had signed for the club earlier in the season, establishing himself as Middlesbrough's first-choice right-back. Despite this, Parnaby made 16 appearances for the club. Middlesbrough won the 2003–04 League Cup, and despite not making the squad for the final, he appeared in the earlier rounds. It was Parnaby's shot in the semi-final second leg against Arsenal which was deflected in by José Antonio Reyes to seal the win for Middlesbrough.

Parnaby started the 2004–05 season playing regularly in Middlesbrough's team before he broke his leg during training in October 2004, which was expected to keep him out of action for around three months. Parnaby made his return on 5 February 2005 in a 1–0 home win over Blackburn Rovers. After getting playing time for 10 matches, he suffered an injury that kept him out for a week before making his return on 29 April, coming on as a substitute in a 1–1 draw away to Liverpool. He finished the season with 24 appearances.

In August 2005, Parnaby suffered a knee injury that resulted in him missing the start of the 2005–06 season. He made his first-team return on 2 October, coming on as a substitute, in a 3–2 win over Aston Villa. His return was later short-lived when he suffered a minor knock during a League Cup match against Crystal Palace. After three weeks out, Parnaby made his return to the first team on 26 December in a 2–0 home loss to Blackburn. He scored his first Middlesbrough goal on 17 January 2006, in a 5–2 home win over Nuneaton Borough in the fourth round of the FA Cup. A few weeks later, on 31 January, he scored his first Premier League goal, in a 3–0 win over Sunderland. He then scored his first European goal on 16 February in the first leg of last 16 of UEFA Cup, in a 2–1 away win over VfB Stuttgart. However, Parnaby suffered a hamstring injury during a match against Birmingham City and was expected to be sidelined for three to four weeks. He made his return on 26 March against Bolton Wanderers and scored in a 4–3 home win. He played a full part in their progress to the semi-final of the FA Cup and the final of the UEFA Cup, in which he started. He finished the season with 42 appearances and four goals.

Parnaby was Middlesbrough's first-choice right-back at the start of the 2006–07 season, but the form and performances of fellow defenders Andrew Davies and Abel Xavier saw him lose his place in the starting line-up. He suffered a broken toe after colliding with Paul Dickov during a match against Manchester City on 30 October 2006. He made his return in December before suffering a knee injury in January 2007. After making his return to the team, Parnaby went on to finish 2006–07 with 21 appearances. At the end of the season, he was released by Middlesbrough.

=== Birmingham City ===
==== 2007–2009 ====
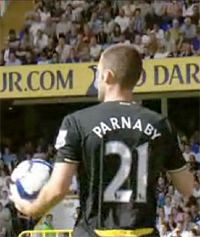
Parnaby playing for Birmingham City in 2009

Parnaby signed a three-year contract with newly promoted Premier League club Birmingham City on 1 June 2007 on a free transfer. He revealed that manager Steve Bruce was the main factor in joining Birmingham, stating he made him feel "10 feet tall". Parnaby made his debut on 12 August in the opening match of the 2007–08 season, coming on as a substitute for Queudrue in the 51st minute of a 3–2 away loss against Chelsea. As the season progressed, he struggled with injuries and loss of form, and was unable to dislodge Stephen Kelly from the right-back spot. Parnaby made 15 appearances in 2007–08, which culminated in relegation from the Premier League for Birmingham.

In pre-season in preparation for the 2008–09 season, Kelly picked up an injury, so manager Alex McLeish picked Parnaby for the first match of the season against Sheffield United in the Championship. After making another appearance, Parnaby stated his intention of establishing himself in the team. Following the return of Kelly, he expected to compete with Kelly for the right-back position. However, his season was disrupted by ankle, hamstring and muscle injuries, with his last appearance coming in January 2009. He finished the season 24 appearances as Birmingham were promoted to the Premier League as Championship runners-up.

==== 2009–2012 ====
Parnaby was a substitute in Birmingham's first match after their return to the Premier League, against Portsmouth, replacing Grégory Vignal in a 1–0 home victory on 19 August 2009. A week later on 25 August, he provided an assist for Lee Carsley, which turned out to be the winning goal in a 2–1 win over Southampton in the second round of the League Cup. Parnaby struggled with back and groin injuries during the 2009–10 season, and after returning to fitness was unable to displace Stephen Carr at right-back. Parnaby finished the season with 11 appearances.

Parnaby signed a one-year contract extension with Birmingham in June 2010. He regained his fitness over pre-season ahead of the 2010–11 season, which he described as the best summer of his career. He made his first appearance of the season on 21 September in a 3–1 home win over Milton Keynes Dons in the third round of League Cup. Parnaby scored his first goal for Birmingham on 29 January 2011 in a 3–2 home win against Coventry City in the third round of FA Cup. He was an unused substitute as Birmingham won the 2010–11 League Cup, defeating Arsenal 2–1 at Wembley Stadium in the final on 27 February. This was the first major trophy won by the club in 48 years. He was released by Birmingham following their relegation from the Premier League at the end of the 2010–11 season, in which he made 11 appearances and scored one goal.

After a short trial, Parnaby was reported in late September 2011 to have agreed a contract and passed a medical with former club Birmingham City, but the club made a decision not to proceed. He later had trials with Millwall, Charlton Athletic, Carlisle United and Hull City.

=== Return to Middlesbrough ===
After a year without a club, Parnaby signed for former club Middlesbrough on 2 July 2012 on a two-year contract, with the option of a further year. He made his debut on 25 September as manager Tony Mowbray made eleven changes for the League Cup match away to Preston North End, which Middlesbrough won 3–1. He struggled with injuries throughout the 2012–13 season, limiting him to 18 appearances.

Parnaby made his return from injury to start in the opening match of the 2013–14 season, a 2–1 home loss against Leicester City on 3 August 2013. His season, however, was disrupted by a knee injury, making three appearances, with the last coming in September. Following the end of the season, he was released by Middlesbrough.

=== Hartlepool United ===
Parnaby signed for League Two club Hartlepool United on 26 June 2014. He made his debut on 9 August in the opening match of the 2014–15 season, a 1–0 away loss to Stevenage. He picked up two hamstring injuries early in the season before having surgery for a knee problem in November, which ruled him out for the rest of the season. He had made five appearances for Hartlepool, the last coming in September. At the end of the season, he was released by the club. He announced his retirement from playing on 10 September 2015.

== International career ==
Parnaby made his debut for the England national under-16 team on 23 June 1998 when starting their 4–1 defeat to the United States (US), as part of a tour of the country. He started all of the under-16's matches from June 1998 to May 1999, and scored his only goal at this level on 30 March 1999 in a 1–0 win over Turkey in a friendly. Parnaby was part of the team at the 1999 UEFA European Under-16 Championship, and played in all of their four matches before they were eliminated by the Czech Republic in the quarter-final. He finished his under-16 career with 11 caps and one goal from 1998 to 1999.

Parnaby debuted for the under-18s on 8 March 2000 as a starter in a 3–0 defeat to France in a friendly. His only goal at this level came on 11 October with a 90th-minute winner against Italy in 2001 UEFA European Under-18 Championship qualification. He was a regular starter for the under-18s, making eight appearances and scoring one goal from 2000 to 2001.

Parnaby made his debut for the under-20s on 10 April 2002 when starting a 2–0 defeat to Portugal in a friendly. He played in three of the team's five matches at the 2002 Toulon Tournament, and scored a 46th-minute goal in the second match, a 1–0 victory over Poland on 10 May. He made four appearances and scored one goal for the under-20s in 2002.

Parnaby debuted for the under-21s on 6 September 2002 as a 78th-minute substitute in a 1–1 draw with FR Yugoslavia in a friendly. He made his first start on 2 June 2003 in a 3–2 win over Serbia and Montenegro in a friendly. He made two further appearances, finishing his under-21 career with four caps from 2002 to 2003.

== Coaching career ==
Seven months after announcing his retirement, Parnaby re-joined Hartlepool as the club's pre-rehabilitation and conditioning coach in April 2016. He was removed from his position in July 2017.

Parnaby joined Martin Gray's backroom staff at National League North club York City in July 2018 as strength and conditioning coach. When Gray left the club, youth-team manager Sam Collins took over as caretaker manager on 20 August, with Parnaby his assistant. Collins and Parnaby were appointed permanently on 10 October after recording four wins from eight matches. Parnaby left the club on 7 January 2019 shortly after Collins was dismissed as manager with the team 15th in the table.

Parnaby joined the coaching staff of National League North club Spennymoor Town on 9 January 2020. He was named as manager Tommy Miller's assistant on 20 May 2021. He left the club on 5 December following the dismissal of Miller.

== Personal life ==
Parnaby married his partner of seven years, Paula, in his home city of Durham in 2010. Parnaby and his wife were expecting their first child in January 2014, but the pregnancy resulted in a stillbirth. Ahead of the match against Brighton & Hove Albion, Middlesbrough's players wore black armbands as a mark of respect. Her death prompted Parnaby to set up an online charity appeal, which raised over £5,000 in two days.

Parnaby has an older brother, who is a golfer and resides in the US.

== Career statistics ==
Appearances and goals by club, season and competition
Club	Season	League			FA Cup		League Cup		Other		Total	
Club	Season	Division	Apps	Goals	Apps	Goals	Apps	Goals	Apps	Goals	Apps	Goals
Middlesbrough	2000–01	Premier League	0	0	0	0	1	0	—		1	0
Middlesbrough	2001–02	Premier League	0	0	0	0	0	0	—		0	0
Middlesbrough	2002–03	Premier League	21	0	1	0	1	0	—		23	0
Middlesbrough	2003–04	Premier League	13	0	1	0	2	0	—		16	0
Middlesbrough	2004–05	Premier League	19	0	0	0	0	0	5 (Note: Appearances in UEFA Cup)	0	24	0
Middlesbrough	2005–06	Premier League	20	2	8	1	3	0	11	1	42	4
Middlesbrough	2006–07	Premier League	18	0	2	0	1	0	—		21	0
Middlesbrough	Total		91	2	12	1	8	0	16	1	127	4
Halifax Town (loan)	2000–01	Third Division	6	0	0	0	—		0	0	6	0
Birmingham City	2007–08	Premier League	13	0	0	0	2	0	—		15	0
Birmingham City	2008–09	Championship	21	0	1	0	2	0	—		24	0
Birmingham City	2009–10	Premier League	8	0	1	0	2	0	—		11	0
Birmingham City	2010–11	Premier League	5	0	4	1	2	0	—		11	1
Birmingham City	Total		47	0	6	1	8	0	—		61	1
Middlesbrough	2012–13	Championship	14	0	2	0	2	0	—		18	0
Middlesbrough	2013–14	Championship	3	0	0	0	0	0	—		3	0
Middlesbrough	Total		17	0	2	0	2	0	—		21	0
Hartlepool United	2014–15	League Two	5	0	0	0	0	0	0	0	5	0
Career total			166	2	20	2	18	0	16	1	220	5

== Honours ==
Middlesbrough

- UEFA Cup runner-up: 2005–06

Birmingham City

- Football League Cup: 2010–11
