= 2004–05 Middlesbrough F.C. season =

Middlesbrough
2004–05 season
- Chairman: Steve Gibson
- Manager: Steve McClaren
- FA Premier League: 7th
- FA Cup: Fourth Round
- League Cup: Fourth Round
- UEFA Cup: Round of 16
- Top goalscorer: League: Jimmy Floyd Hasselbaink (13); All: Jimmy Floyd Hasselbaink (16)
- Highest home attendance: 34,836 v Norwich (Premier League); Away: 67,988 v Manchester United (Premier League)
- Lowest home attendance: 29,603 v Charlton Athletic (Premier League); Away: 17,759 v Fulham (Premier League)
Home colours	Away colours

During the 2004–05 season, Middlesbrough participated in the FA Premier League.

== Final league table ==
Pos	Team	Pld	W	D	L	GF	GA	GD	Pts	Qualification or relegation
5	Liverpool	38	17	7	14	52	41	+11	58	Qualification for the Champions League first qualifying round (Note: Although they failed to qualify for the Champions League as one of the top four English clubs, Liverpool were given a special dispensation to compete as the defending champions. They were, however, forced to enter in the first qualifying round.)
6	Bolton Wanderers	38	16	10	12	49	44	+5	58	Qualification for the UEFA Cup first round (Note: Since the finalists of the FA Cup, Arsenal and Manchester United, as well as Chelsea, who won the 2004–05 Football League Cup, were qualified for the Champions League, and the fifth-placed team (Liverpool) were moved to the Champions League, the sixth and seventh-placed teams in the Premier League were rewarded entry to the UEFA Cup.)
7	Middlesbrough	38	14	13	11	53	46	+7	55	Qualification for the UEFA Cup first round
8	Manchester City	38	13	13	12	47	39	+8	52	
9	Tottenham Hotspur	38	14	10	14	47	41	+6	52	

Rules for classification: 1) points; 2) goal difference; 3) number of goals scored.

== Kit ==
During this season, Middlesbrough had a new sponsor, 888.com. The team's kit was produced by Errea. The home shirt included a white band on it for the first time since the 2000–01 season. The away strip was mainly white with maroon sleeves, navy blue shorts and white socks. Away to Southampton, white shorts and navy socks were worn with the away shirt.

== Season review ==
After the triumph in the League Cup final the previous season and a solid 11th-place finish in the league, Boro fans were optimistic that this season would be a success. Steve McClaren signed Boudewijn Zenden and Doriva on permanent deals following their loan spells, as well as adding high-profile signings Ray Parlour, Mark Viduka, Jimmy Floyd Hasselbaink and Michael Reiziger to the squad. With these new additions, the supporters felt that, come the end of the season, Boro would be pushing for a league place good enough to qualify for Europe.

The season started well and Middlesbrough found themselves in fourth position following only one loss in the first 5 games. Despite a slight drop in their form, Boro kept in and around the top four until mid-November.

However, the UEFA Cup took its toll on the small Boro squad and their form stuttered towards Christmas. The team seemed to consist of more and more young players who were deputising for more senior players such as Gaizka Mendieta and Malcolm Christie who were ruled out for the season with injuries.

Following a 2–0 win at home to Norwich City on 28 December, Boro were in fifth place. However, not helped by an injury to George Boateng, after only one win in the next ten games the team found themselves in ninth and seemed to have undone their good work at the start of the season.

Things did finally pick up and, following only three losses in the final 12 games of the season, they found themselves up against Manchester City in the final game of the season. Both teams were in direct contest for the seventh place that Boro occupied, and a win for either side would mean qualification for the UEFA Cup. A last-minute penalty save by Mark Schwarzer gave Boro a 1–1 draw and the all-important seventh-placed finish. For the first time in their history, Middlesbrough had qualified for Europe through the league.

The season was full of highs and lows for the Boro fans. The disappointment of losing their early strong position due to the injury crisis was offset against the emergence of several promising youngsters such as Stewart Downing, James Morrison and Anthony McMahon.

Both domestic cups were disappointing for the Boro team and the draws weren't favourable towards them. They only lasted two rounds in each competition, going out in the fourth round of both cups, to Manchester United in the FA Cup and to a young Liverpool side in the League Cup. The UEFA Cup run - Middlesbrough's first foray into Europe, having won the first major trophy of their history, the League Cup, the previous season - held greater joy. The first round was a two-legged knockout match against Baník Ostrava - Boro's first ever European match, with the first leg was at home. With a fantastic atmosphere at the Riverside, Middlesbrough cruised through the first leg 3–0; with a comfortable 1–1 draw in the away leg, they had qualified for the group stages and were guaranteed another 4 matches.

Middlesbrough were drawn in Group D, along with Villarreal, Lazio, Egaleo and Partizan Belgrade. The fans were confident that the team could earn at least a third-place finish in the group and therefore qualify for the knockout stages.

Boro went on to exceed all expectations, beating Egalio and Partizan Belgrade as expected and also achieving a fantastic 2–0 victory over Lazio - the only blot being a 2–0 away loss to Villarreal. This was enough to earn them a second-place finish and qualification for the next round, where Middlesbrough were drawn against Grazer AK. Middlesbrough managed a 2–2 draw against the then Austrian champions in the first leg, away. The team duly built on this in the return leg and progressed to the next round following a 2–1 win.

The round of 16 saw Boro face Sporting CP for a place in the quarter finals. However, luck wasn't with Middlesbrough and they found themselves in the middle of an injury crisis. The first leg was at home and remained goalless at half time. Sporting then proceed to show their class and scored 3 in a thirty-minute spell after the break. Boro looked like they were to exit the competition, but a spectacular overhead scissor kick from Joseph Desire-Job and a late Chris Riggott goal gave a weakened Boro team a fairly respectable 3–2 loss. The second leg didn't go to plan though; despite fantastic support from 3,000 travelling fans, Middlesbrough went down 1–0, losing 4–2 on aggregate. The Boro fans took the defeat in good heart, however, and partied late into the night in Lisbon.

Middlesbrough's UEFA Cup run was seen as a huge success by the fans, and expectations were high for the following year's campaign.

== First-team squad ==
The following are all the players who were involved the Middlesbrough F.C. first team at some point during the 2004-05 season. Note: Flags indicate national team as defined under FIFA eligibility rules; some limited exceptions apply. Players may hold more than one non-FIFA nationality.

No.	Pos.	Nation	Player
1	GK	AUS	Mark Schwarzer
2	DF	NED	Michael Reiziger
3	DF	FRA	Franck Queudrue
4	DF	ENG	Ugo Ehiogu
5	DF	ENG	Chris Riggott
6	DF	ENG	Gareth Southgate (captain)
7	MF	NED	George Boateng
8	FW	SVK	Szilárd Németh
9	FW	ITA	Massimo Maccarone
11	FW	ENG	Malcolm Christie
12	GK	ENG	Carlo Nash
14	MF	ESP	Gaizka Mendieta
15	MF	ENG	Ray Parlour
16	FW	CMR	Joseph-Désiré Job
17	MF	ENG	Mark Wilson
18	FW	NED	Jimmy Floyd Hasselbaink
19	MF	ENG	Stewart Downing
20	MF	BRA	Doriva

No.	Pos.	Nation	Player
21	DF	ENG	Stuart Parnaby
22	GK	AUS	Brad Jones
23	DF	ENG	Colin Cooper
24	DF	ENG	Andrew Davies
25	MF	ENG	James Morrison
26	DF	ENG	Matthew Bates
27	GK	ENG	Ross Turnbull
28	DF	ENG	Andrew Taylor
29	DF	ENG	Anthony McMahon
30	FW	ENG	Danny Graham
31	DF	ENG	David Wheater
32	MF	NED	Boudewijn Zenden
33	MF	ENG	Anthony Peacock
34	MF	ENG	Jason Kennedy
35	GK	ENG	David Knight
36	FW	AUS	Mark Viduka
37	MF	ENG	Adam Johnson
38	GK	ENG	Chris Pennock

== Transfers ==
=== In ===
Date	Player	Previous club	Cost
6 July 2004	(Netherlands) Michael Reiziger	(Spain) Barcelona	Free
8 July 2004	(Australia) Mark Viduka	Leeds United	£4,500,000
9 July 2004	(Netherlands) Jimmy Floyd Hasselbaink	Chelsea	Free
23 July 2004	(England) Ray Parlour	Arsenal	Free
3 August 2004	(Netherlands) Boudewijn Zenden	Chelsea	Free

=== Out ===
Date	Player	Buying club	Cost
22 April 2004	(Brazil) Ricardinho	Released	Free
23 June 2004	(England) Michael Ricketts	Leeds United	Free
23 June 2004	(England) Robbie Stockdale	Rotherham United	Nominal
29 June 2004	(England) Jonathan Greening	West Bromwich Albion	£1,250,000
25 August 2004	(Brazil) Juninho	(Scotland) Celtic	Free
23 March 2005	(England) Carlo Nash	Preston North End	£175,000

== Results ==
=== Premier League ===
Win Draw Loss

==== Results per matchday ====
Matchday	1	2	3	4	5	6	7	8	9	10	11	12	13	14	15	16	17	18	19	20	21	22	23	24	25	26	27	28	29	30	31	32	33	34	35	36	37	38
Ground	H	A	A	H	H	A	H	A	A	H	A	H	A	H	A	H	A	H	A	H	H	A	H	A	A	H	A	H	A	H	A	H	H	H	A	A	H	A
Result	D	L	W	W	W	L	L	D	W	D	W	D	W	W	L	W	D	W	L	W	L	L	D	D	L	W	D	D	L	L	W	L	D	W	D	D	W	D
Position	3	19	7	4	4	6	10	9	5	8	4	5	4	4	5	5	5	5	5	5	5	6	6	6	6	6	6	6	6	9	7	7	8	7	7	7	7	7

Updated to match(es) played on 15 May 2005. Source: Statto.com
A = Away; H = Home; W = Win; D = Draw; L = Loss

Note: Results are given with Middlesbrough score listed first. Man of the Match is according to mfc.co.uk.

Game	Date	Venue	Opponent	Result F–A	Attendance	Boro goalscorers	Man of the match
1	14 August 2004	H	Newcastle United	2–2	34,268	Downing 73', Hasselbaink 90'	Reiziger
2	22 August 2004	A	Arsenal	3–5	37,415	Job 43', Hasselbaink 50', Queudrue 53'	Queudrue
3	25 August 2004	A	Fulham	2–0	17,759	Viduka 54', Németh 79'	Parlour
4	28 August 2004	H	Crystal Palace	2–1	31,560	Popovic (o.g.) 61', Hasselbaink 78'	Mendieta
5	11 September 2004	H	Birmingham City	2–1	30,252	Viduka (2) 27', 48'	Boateng
6	19 September 2004	A	Everton	0–1	34,078		Schwarzer
7	25 September 2004	H	Chelsea	0–1	32,341		Schwarzer
8	3 October 2004	A	Manchester United	1–1	67,988	Downing 33'	Southgate
9	16 October 2004	A	Blackburn Rovers	4–0	20,385	Hasselbaink (3) 46', 57', 90', Boateng 50'	Hasselbaink
10	24 October 2004	H	Portsmouth	1–1	30,964	Downing 74'	Parlour
11	30 October 2004	A	Charlton Athletic	2–1	26,031	El Karkouri (o.g.) 21', Zenden 58'	Zenden
12	7 November 2004	H	Bolton Wanderers	1–1	29,656	Boateng 90'	Boateng
13	14 November 2004	A	West Bromwich Albion	2–1	24,008	Purse (o.g.) 32', Zenden 52'	Schwarzer
14	20 November 2004	H	Liverpool	2–0	34,751	Riggott 36', Zenden 62'	Parlour
15	28 November 2004	A	Tottenham Hotspur	0–2	35,772		Riggott
16	6 December 2004	H	Manchester City	3–2	29,787	Viduka (2) 9', 54', Hasselbaink 65'	Viduka
17	11 December 2004	A	Southampton	2–2	29,018	Higginbotham (o.g.) 89', Downing 90'	Downing
18	18 December 2004	H	Aston Villa	3–0	31,338	Hasselbaink 20', Job 68', Reiziger 88'	McMahon
19	26 December 2004	A	Birmingham City	0–2	29,082		Reiziger
20	28 December 2004	H	Norwich City	2–0{	34,836	Job (2) 52', 54'	Downing
21	1 January 2005	H	Manchester United	0–2	34,199		Downing
22	4 January 2005	A	Chelsea	0–2	40,982		Parlour
23	16 January 2005	H	Everton	1–1	31,794	Zenden 26'	Zenden
24	22 January 2005	A	Norwich City	4–4	24,547	Hasselbaink (2) 34', 78', Queudrue (2) 49', 55'	Downing
25	1 February 2005	A	Portsmouth	1–2	19,620	Christie 35'	Parlour
26	5 February 2005	H	Blackburn Rovers	1–0	30,564	Queudrue 35'	Zenden
27	12 February 2005	A	Bolton Wanderers	0–0	24,322		Schwarzer
28	27 February 2005	H	Charlton Athletic	2–2	29,603	Riggott 74', Graham 86'	Riggott
29	5 March 2005	A	Aston Villa	0–2	34,201		Parnaby
30	20 March 2005	H	Southampton	1–3	30,082	Hasselbaink 41'	Doriva
31	2 April 2005	A	Crystal Palace	1–0	24,274	Queudrue 35'	Queudrue
32	9 April 2005	H	Arsenal	0–1	33,874		Boateng
33	19 April 2005	H	Fulham	1–1	30,650	Zenden (pen.) 90'	Queudrue
34	23 April 2005	H	West Bromwich Albion	4–0	32,951	Németh (2) 27', 37', Hasselbaink 33', Downing 90'+3	Németh
35	27 April 2005	A	Newcastle United	0–0	52,047		Jones
36	30 April 2005	A	Liverpool	1–1	43,250	Németh 4'	Southgate
37	7 May 2005	H	Tottenham Hotspur	1–0	34,766	Boateng 11'	Boateng
38	15 May 2005	A	Manchester City	1–1	47,221	Hasselbaink 23'	Southgate

=== League Cup ===
Round	Date	Opponent	Venue	Result	Attendance	Goalscorers
3	27 October 2004	Coventry City	Home	3-0	11,833	Nemeth, Morrison, Graham
4	10 November 2004	Liverpool	Away	2-0	28,176	

=== FA Cup ===
Round	Date	Opponent	Venue	Result	Attendance	Goalscorers
3	8 January 2005	Notts County	Away	2-1	13,671	Doriva, Job
4	29 January 2005	Manchester United	Away	3-0	67,251	

=== UEFA Cup ===
Round	Date	Opponent	Venue	Result	Attendance	Goalscorers	Referee
1 Leg 1	16 September 2004	(Czech Republic) Baník Ostrava	Home	3-0	29,746	Hasselbaink, Viduka (2)	Pascal Garibian (France)
1 Leg 2	30 September 2004	(Czech Republic) Baník Ostrava	Away	1-1 (3–1 agg)	15,351	Morrison	Matteo Trefoloni (Italy)
Grp E	21 October 2004	(Greece) Egaleo	Away	1-0	4,000	Downing	Attila Hanacsek (Hungary)
Grp E	4 November 2004	(Italy) Lazio	Home	2-0	33,991	Zenden (2)	Yuri Baskakov (Russia)
Grp E	25 November 2004	(Spain) Villarreal	Away	2-0	14,250		Jan Wegereef (Netherlands)
Grp E	15 December 2004	(Serbia and Montenegro) Partizan	Home	3-0	20,856	Nemeth, Job, Morrison	Grzegorz Gilewski (Poland)
3 Leg 1	17 February 2005	(Austria) Grazer AK	Away	2-2	13,000	Zenden, Hasselbaink	Edo Trivković (Croatia)
3 Leg 2	24 February 2005	(Austria) Grazer AK	Home	2-1 (4–3 agg)	20,371	Morrison, Hasselbaink	Eduardo Iturralde González (Spain)
4 Leg 1	10 March 2005	(Portugal) Sporting	Home	2-3	23,739	Job, Riggott	Stefano Farina (Italy)
4 Leg 2	17 March 2005	(Portugal) Sporting	Away	1-0 (4–2 agg)	21,217		Éric Poulat (France)

== Player statistics ==
=== Goalscorers ===
Goalscoring statistics for 2004-05.

Name	League	FA Cup	League Cup	Europe	Total
(Netherlands) Hasselbaink	13	0	0	3	16
(Cameroon) Job	5	1	0	2	8
(Australia) Viduka	5	0	0	2	7
(Netherlands) Zenden	4	0	0	3	7
(England) Downing	5	0	0	1	6
(Slovakia) Németh	4	0	1	1	6
(France) Queudrue	5	0	0	0	5
(England) Morrison	0	0	1	3	4
(Netherlands) Boateng	3	0	0	0	3
(England) Riggott	2	0	0	1	3
(England) Graham	1	0	1	0	2
(Netherlands) Reiziger	1	0	0	0	1
(England) Christie	1	0	0	0	1
(Brazil) Doriva	0	1	0	0	1
Own Goals	4	0	0	0	4

=== Appearances and discipline ===
Appearance and disciplinary records for 2004-05 league and cup matches.

Name	Appearances	Yellow cards	Red cards
(Australia) Schwarzer	43	0	0
(Australia) Jones	5	0	0
(England) Nash	4	0	0
(England) Parnaby	20+4	1	0
(France) Queudrue	43	8	2
(England) Ehiogu	11+1	1	0
(England) Riggott	31+1	4	0
(England) Southgate	47	6	0
(Netherlands) Reiziger	21+4	1	0
(England) Bates	0+2	0	0
(England) Davies	4+1	0	0
(England) McMahon	16+3	3	0
(England) Cooper	17+4	0	0
(England) Wheater	0+1	0	0
(Spain) Mendieta	7+1	1	0
(Netherlands) Boateng	29	8	0
(England) Wilson	1	0	0
(England) Downing	40+8	1	0
(England) Morrison	12+11	2	0
(England) Johnson	0+1	0	0
(Brazil) Doriva	26+12	6	0
(England) Parlour	40+1	13	1
(Netherlands) Zenden	48+1	9	0
(England) Kennedy	0+1	0	0
(Australia) Viduka	19+2	0	0
(England) Christie	2+1	0	0
(Netherlands) Hasselbaink	43+2	3	0
(England) Graham	1+16	0	0
(Slovakia) Németh	25+15	1	0
(Cameroon) Job	17+16	0	0
