= Stuart Wise =

English footballer

Personal information
- Full name: Stuart Wise
- Date of birth: 4 April 1984 (age 42)
- Place of birth: Middlesbrough, England
- Positions: Defender; striker

Team information
- Current team: Stokesley

Youth career
- ?–2001: York City

Senior career*
| Years | Team | Apps | (Gls) |
| 2001–2004 | York City | 33 | (1) |
| 2004 | West Auckland Town | ? | (?) |
| 2004–2005 | Gateshead | 11 | (2) |
- Stokesley
- * Club domestic league appearances and goals

Stuart Wise (born 4 April 1984) is an English former footballer who plays for Stokesley as a defender and a striker. He started his career with York City, making his first team debut in 2002. He played 35 games for York before leaving in 2004 to continue his career as a semi-professional. In 2023, he began coaching young players in his own academy W2 Football Academy.

== Career ==
Born in Middlesbrough, Wise began his career with the youth system of York City after signing as a schoolboy. He made his first team debut as a substitute in a 2–1 defeat to Luton Town on 23 February 2002 and impressed manager Terry Dolan. He signed a professional contract with York in May 2003. He was substituted in a 1–0 victory over Huddersfield Town in August after suffering a knee injury. He made his return in a 2–1 defeat to Rochdale, before being sent off following a fracas with Paul Connor. He scored after five minutes against Leyton Orient in May 2004, which finished as a 2–1 defeat, a result that confirmed York's relegation to the Conference National. He was told to lose weight to win a new contract at the end of the 2003–04 season, although he decided to leave the club and enroll on a machinery qualification and play as a semi-professional. He made 35 appearances for York in all competitions. Wise later played non-League football with West Auckland Town and Gateshead. He plays for Northern League Division Two team Stokesley as of 2010.

In July 2023, Wise and David Wheater set up W2 Football Academy for boys and girls aged 5 to 11 with the duo coaching them.

== Style of play ==
Wise is a pacy player who started his career as a central defender, before playing as a striker.
