= Ray Parlour =

English footballer

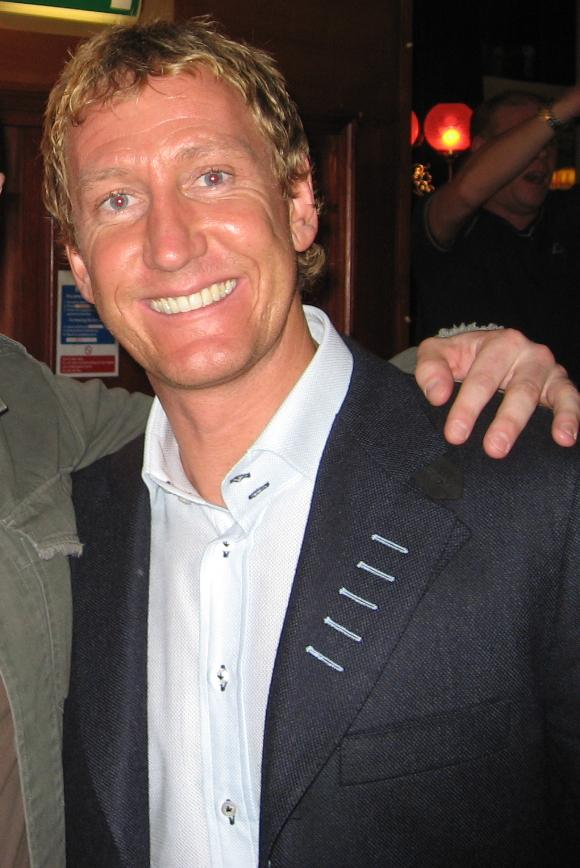
- Parlour in 2006

Personal information
- Full name: Raymond Parlour
- Date of birth: 7 March 1973 (age 53)
- Place of birth: Romford, England
- Height: 1.78 m (5 ft 10 in)
- Position: Midfielder

Youth career
- 1989–1992: Arsenal

Senior career*
Years	Team	Apps	(Gls)
1992–2004	Arsenal	339	(22)
2004–2007	Middlesbrough	46	(0)
2007	Hull City	15	(0)
2012	Wembley	0	(0)
Total		400	(22)

International career
1992–1994	England U21	12	(0)
1998	England B	1	(0)
1999–2000	England	10	(0)
- * Club domestic league appearances and goals

Raymond Parlour (born 7 March 1973) is an English former professional footballer and sports radio pundit for BBC Radio 5 Live and Talksport.

He was a midfielder from 1992 to 2007, and spent his career playing for Arsenal, Middlesbrough and Hull City. He totalled 466 games and 32 goals for Arsenal, winning honours including three Premier League titles, four FA Cup and the 1994 UEFA Cup Winners' Cup. He played ten games for England in 1999 and 2000.

While at Arsenal he was nicknamed "The Romford Pelé", coined by Paul Day, an ironic sobriquet reflecting his combination of solid performance with a humorous, self-deprecating, down to earth personality and an image wholly lacking in glamour. He has been described as an "unsung hero" and praised as a "fans' favourite" for his high work rate and commitment. After retiring, Parlour became a pundit on television and radio. In 2012, he briefly came out of retirement to play for Wembley in the club's FA Cup fixtures.

== Club career ==
=== Arsenal ===
Parlour is most famous for his time at Arsenal, where he played for fifteen years. He joined the club as a trainee in 1985, aged 12, and made his debut for the Gunners against Liverpool on 29 January 1992, conceding a penalty in a 2–0 defeat. Just 5 more appearances followed that year but the following season he began to feature more regularly and made starting appearances in the 1993 League Cup and FA Cup finals of which Arsenal won both.

In the 1993–94 season he made 32 appearances and then rose to greater prominence in 1994–95 when he took part in Arsenal's European UEFA Cup Winners' Cup final loss to Real Zaragoza (having been an unused substitute in the Gunners' 1–0 triumph over Parma in 1993–94). After the arrival of Arsène Wenger as Arsenal's manager in 1996, he became a regular fixture on the right wing or in central midfield. In 1997–98 Arsenal won the Double, and Parlour was instrumental in his club's achievement: he was man-of-the-match in the Gunners' FA Cup Final win over Newcastle United, setting up Nicolas Anelka for the second goal in a 2–0 win. His increasing success in his Gunners shirt did not, however, secure him a place in England's 1998 World Cup squad, coach Glenn Hoddle preferring Spurs' Darren Anderton instead.

In March 2000, he hit a hat-trick in a 4–2 away win at Werder Bremen (6–2 aggregate) in the UEFA Cup quarter-finals. He was the only Arsenal player successful from the penalty spot in the team's shoot-out defeat by Galatasaray in the final. Seven months later, he contributed another hat-trick to a 5–0 win over Newcastle United at Highbury. In April 2001, at the same ground, he struck a 30-yard winner as Arsenal beat Valencia 2–1 in the first leg tie of a UEFA Champions League quarter-final. In 2002, another year in which Arsenal won the Double, he opened the scoring in the Gunners' 2–0 FA Cup Final victory over Chelsea, putting his club ahead with a 30-yard strike that Soccer AM presenter Tim Lovejoy famously failed to anticipate: "Oh, it's all right, it's only Ray Parlour". In November 2003, he was the stand-in captain who led his team to a 5–1 victory over Inter Milan at the San Siro.

In total, Parlour played 466 games for the Gunners, scoring 32 goals in all competitions. His curriculum vitae with the club includes three Premier League titles, four FA Cups, one League Cup and one European Cup Winners' Cup. His record of 333 Premier League appearances for Arsenal has not been surpassed by any other player in the club's history. Even at the peak of his success, though, he was less acclaimed by football journalists than several of his Arsenal contemporaries, spending much of his time at the club in the shadow of Patrick Vieira in particular. Many Arsenal fans believe him to have been one of the most underrated players of his generation.

=== Middlesbrough ===
In July 2004, Parlour joined fellow Premier League club Middlesbrough on a free transfer, signing a three-year contract at the Riverside Stadium. He played 60 games for Boro in two and a half years, and was an unused substitute in their 4–0 defeat by Sevilla in the 2006 UEFA Cup final. In October 2005, he was ruled out for two months for knee cartilage surgery. He was released from his contract on 25 January 2007, and returned to train at Arsenal.

=== Hull City ===
On 9 February 2007, Hull City signed Parlour until the end of the 2006–07 season in the hope that his experience would help them to avoid relegation. With their place in the Championship secured, it was confirmed on 1 June that the club would not be retaining Parlour's services for the following season's campaign.

=== Wembley ===
In June 2012, Parlour was one of several retired footballers enlisted by the semi-professional Wembley to assist them in the forthcoming season's FA Cup. His fellow former internationals Claudio Caniggia, Graeme Le Saux, Martin Keown and Brian McBride joined him as players, David Seaman was recruited as a goalkeeping coach and Terry Venables, formerly the manager of England, served as the club's technical advisor. A television documentary recorded the team's improbable quest for Wembley Stadium glory. In the event, although Wembley knocked out Langford, the club proved unable to progress beyond a replay against Uxbridge.

== International career ==
Parlour made his debut for the England under-21 team on 12 May 1992; he played the whole game as England drew 2–2 with Hungary in a friendly. He was a part of the squads that participated in the Toulon Tournament in 1992 and 1994, England would ultimately win the tournament in 1994 with Parlour playing in the final against Portugal. Parlour won the Prix Spécial award for his performances in the tournament., Overall, he appeared for the U21s on twelve occasions without scoring any goals. On 10 February 1998, he played for the B-team in a 1–0 loss to Chile at The Hawthorns.

He made his senior team debut as a substitute in a UEFA Euro 2000 qualifier against Poland on 27 March 1999; he won ten caps for England altogether, without ever scoring any goals. The closest he came to one was in a 2002 FIFA World Cup qualifier against Finland on 11 October 2000, when he 'scored' with a spectacular 30-yard strike which hit the crossbar and crossed the goal-line but was incorrectly disallowed by a linesman, the match finishing 0–0. He did not feature in any tournament finals, a knee injury forcing him to withdraw from England's squad for Euro 2000. His final cap came in a friendly against Italy on 15 November 2000. He was called up into the squad several times by new manager Sven-Göran Eriksson in 2001, but was never sent onto the pitch.

Parlour's lack of England appearances despite his domestic successes (particularly in comparison to some of his contemporaries) was remarked upon. Parlour and fellow players attributed this to competition in midfield (David Beckham and later Frank Lampard and Steven Gerrard were usually chosen ahead of Parlour), as well as Parlour's falling out with England manager Glenn Hoddle following Hoddle's usage of a faith healer in the England camp for injured players.

== Media career ==
Parlour began his career as a pundit with Setanta Sports in 2007. He has since appeared on BBC Radio 5 Live and Talksport.

In 2019 and 2020, Parlour featured in both seasons of ITV show Harry's Heroes, which featured former football manager Harry Redknapp attempting get a squad of former England international footballers back fit and healthy for a game against Germany legends.

== Personal life ==
Parlour and his wife Karen were a couple from their early youth, although they did not get married until 1998. They have three children. Their separation in 2001 led to a very high-profile divorce.

== Career statistics ==
=== Club ===
Appearances and goals by club, season and competition
Club	Season	League			FA Cup		League Cup		Europe		Other		Total	
Club	Season	Division	Apps	Goals	Apps	Goals	Apps	Goals	Apps	Goals	Apps	Goals	Apps	Goals
Arsenal	1991–92	First Division	6	1	0	0	0	0	0	0	0	0	6	1
Arsenal	1992–93	Premier League	21	1	4	1	4	0	—		—		29	2
Arsenal	1993–94	Premier League	27	2	3	0	2	0	0	0	0	0	32	2
Arsenal	1994–95	Premier League	30	0	2	0	5	0	8 (Note: Appearances in UEFA Cup Winners' Cup)	0	1 (Note: Appearance in UEFA Super Cup)	0	46	0
Arsenal	1995–96	Premier League	22	0	0	0	4	0	—		—		26	0
Arsenal	1996–97	Premier League	30	2	3	0	1	0	2 (Note: Appearances in UEFA Cup)	0	—		36	2
Arsenal	1997–98	Premier League	34	5	7	1	4	0	2	0	—		47	6
Arsenal	1998–99	Premier League	35	6	7	0	0	0	4 (Note: Appearances in UEFA Champions League)	0	1 (Note: Appearance in FA Charity Shield)	0	47	6
Arsenal	1999–2000	Premier League	30	1	1	0	2	0	12 (Note: Four appearance in UEFA Champions League, eight appearances and three goals in UEFA Cup)	3	1	1	45	5
Arsenal	2000–01	Premier League	33	4	4	0	0	0	10	2	—		47	6
Arsenal	2001–02	Premier League	27	0	4	2	1	0	8	0	—		40	2
Arsenal	2002–03	Premier League	19	0	6	0	0	0	2	0	1 (Note: Appearance in FA Community Shield)	0	28	0
Arsenal	2003–04	Premier League	25	0	3	0	3	0	5	0	1	0	37	0
Arsenal	Total		339	22	44	4	26	0	57	6	0	0	466	32
Middlesbrough	2004–05	Premier League	33	0	2	0	0	0	6	0	—		41	0
Middlesbrough	2005–06	Premier League	13	0	2	0	0	0	4	0	—		19	0
Middlesbrough	2006–07	Premier League	0	0	0	0	0	0	—		—		0	0
Middlesbrough	Total		46	0	4	0	0	0	10	0	—		60	0
Hull City	2006–07	Championship	15	0	—		—		—		—		15	0
Wembley	2012–13	Combined Counties League	—		1	0	—		—		—		1	0
Career total			400	22	49	4	26	0	67	6	0	0	542	32

=== International ===
Appearances and goals by national team and year
National team	Year	Apps	Goals
England	1999	5	0
England	2000	5	0
Total		10	0

== Honours ==
Arsenal

- Premier League: 1997–98, 2001–02, 2003–04
- FA Cup: 1992–93, 1997–98, 2001–02, 2002–03; runner-up: 2000–01
- Football League Cup: 1992–93
- FA Community Shield: 1998, 1999, 2002
- European/UEFA Cup Winners' Cup: 1993–94; runner-up: 1994–95
- UEFA Cup runner-up: 1999–2000

Middlesbrough

- UEFA Cup runner-up: 2005–06

England U21

- Toulon Tournament: 1994

Individual

- Arsenal Player of the Season: 1997–98
- Premier League Player of the Month: March 1999
