= David Wheater =

English footballer (born 1987)

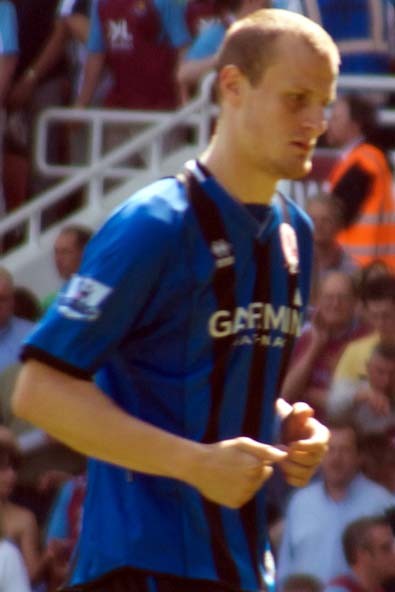
- Wheater playing for Middlesbrough in 2009

Personal information
- Full name: David James Wheater
- Date of birth: 14 February 1987 (age 39)
- Place of birth: Redcar, England
- Height: 6 ft 5 in (1.96 m)
- Position: Centre back

Youth career
- 1997–2004: Middlesbrough

Senior career*
Years	Team	Apps	(Gls)
2004–2011	Middlesbrough	140	(9)
2006	→ Doncaster Rovers (loan)	7	(1)
2006	→ Wolverhampton Wanderers (loan)	1	(0)
2007	→ Darlington (loan)	15	(2)
2011–2019	Bolton Wanderers	212	(15)
2019–2021	Oldham Athletic	34	(4)
2022–2023	Darlington	19	(1)
Total		428	(32)

International career
2002–2003	England U16	2	(0)
2004	England U17	7	(0)
2004	England U18	1	(0)
2005–2006	England U19	7	(0)
2007–2009	England U21	11	(1)
- * Club domestic league appearances and goals

David James Wheater (born 14 February 1987) is an English former professional footballer who played as a defender. Primarily a centre back, he announced his retirement on 1 September 2023. In 2023, he began coaching young players in his own academy W2 Football Academy.

Wheater started his professional career at Middlesbrough in 2004, having graduated through the club's youth teams. He had three loan spells away from Middlesbrough during the 2006–07 season; at Doncaster Rovers, Wolverhampton Wanderers and Darlington (loan). An injury to Jonathan Woodgate at the start of the following season saw Wheater become a regular player for Middlesbrough, and he would make a total of 140 league appearances for the club before switching to Bolton Wanderers in January 2011. After eight and a half years with the club, he spent two seasons with Oldham Athletic and then returned to Darlington in 2022.

Wheater has represented England at under-16, under-17, under-18, under-19, and under-21 levels. Wheater was called up to the senior side in 2008 but did not play.

== Playing career ==
=== Middlesbrough ===
Wheater was born in 1987 in Redcar, which was then in the county of Cleveland. He is a product of the Middlesbrough youth system, and was promoted to the first team at the age of 17 for the 2004–05 season, after tasting success in the FA Youth Cup. He and teammates Andrew Taylor, Matthew Bates and Adam Johnson were part of the team that won the 2004 FA Youth Cup, and also played the previous season's final with Bates and Taylor, but lost out to Manchester United.

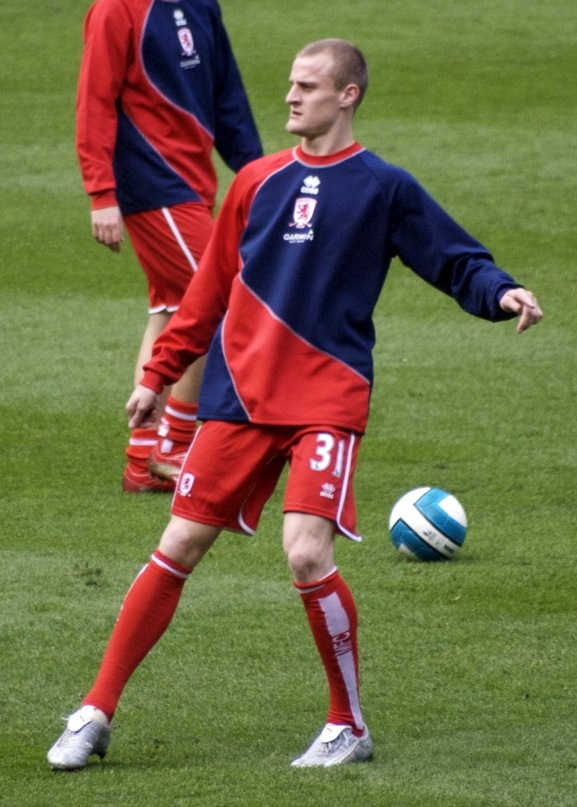
Wheater in Middlesbrough colours

He joined Wolverhampton Wanderers on a three-month loan in September 2006. However, he returned to Middlesbrough on 15 November, after making just one first team appearance. He also had loan spells at Doncaster Rovers, scoring once against Gillingham and Darlington. During the 2007–08 pre-season, Jonathan Woodgate suffered an injury, that allowed Wheater to start in his place during pre-season. Wheater's form in pre-season, earned him a starting XI place for the opening day Premier League fixture – his form then continued, which triggered the transfer of Woodgate to Tottenham Hotspur, as Wheater became the first name on the 'Boro team sheet. Wheater was named in an understrength Middlesbrough side away to Bristol City in the FA Cup third round, when he saved his team with a goal as he burst forward from the back and scored the winner in a 2–1 at Ashton Gate Stadium. He signed a three-and-a-half-year contract extension in February 2008, which tied him to Middlesbrough until June 2011.

Wheater experienced his best season of football during the 2007–08 season, starting as a regular for Gareth Southgate's side and becoming an imposing force at the back. Wheater scored four goals in all competitions during his 2007–08 breakthrough season. At the end of the year, he won the North East Football Writers' Association Young Player of the Year and Player of the Year awards for his exploits. Unfortunately, Middlesbrough were relegated at the end of the 2008–09 season, but Wheater decided to stay to try to help the club regain promotion.

Despite being only 22, Wheater was appointed captain for the 2009–10 season. He experienced his first taste of league captaincy against Bristol City in a 2–1 loss, but when new manager Gordon Strachan was appointed, Strachan decided to hand the captain's armband to the more experienced Gary O'Neil, to let Wheater concentrate more on developing his game. He scored his first league goal in 18 months on 6 February against Ipswich Town to rescue a draw.

He scored his first goal of the 2010–11 season against Reading, to make the scoreline 3–1, and help Middlesbrough secure back to back home wins in the same week. He made his last appearance against Bristol City on 15 January 2011, where he played the full 90 minutes. Middlesbrough won 4–0. His last goal in a Boro shirt was on New Year's Day against Leeds United, which ended in a 1–1 draw.

=== Bolton Wanderers ===
On 20 January 2011, Wheater completed a move to Bolton Wanderers on a three-and-a-half-year contract following a few weeks of negotiations for an undisclosed fee, and made his debut on 29 January in the FA Cup game at home to Wigan Athletic. He made his league debut when coming on as a first-half substitute for the injured Zat Knight in the 2–0 home win over Everton on 13 February. On 24 September, in his first league start of the 2011–12 season replacing the ill Gary Cahill, Wheater received a red card for holding back Theo Walcott during Bolton's game at Arsenal. Two months later on 26 November, while playing in the right-back position, he received his second dismissal of the season when challenging Everton winger Diniyar Bilyaletdinov in a challenge which was deemed a red card by the referee Michael Oliver, which resulted in a four-game ban.

Wheater scored his first goal for Bolton in a 2–2 away draw at Macclesfield Town in the third round of the FA Cup on 7 January 2012. His first league goals for Bolton came when he netted both goals in a 2–1 win against local rivals Blackburn Rovers on 24 March.

On 7 May 2012, he was ruled out of action for up to nine months after rupturing an anterior cruciate ligament in his right knee in Bolton's 2–2 draw with West Bromwich Albion the previous day. His return to the first team came ten months later as he came on as a late substitute in Bolton's 4–1 win against Hull City. Wheater signed a contract extension on 21 July 2013, extending his contract until summer 2016. At the end of the 2015–16 season, the club confirmed that he would be leaving when the contract expired. Despite this, Wheater still trained with the club and played in most of their pre season friendlies for the 2016–17 season, as a trialist player. He then re-signed for the club on a one-year contract on severely reduced wages. Bolton finished the season in second place, earning promotion back to the Championship at the first attempt. Wheater was named as Bolton player of the season for the 2016–17 season. Wheater, alongside defensive partner Mark Beevers, was also named in the League One Team of the Season and Wheater was also voted PFA Fans' Sky Bet League One Player of the Season.

On 1 June 2017, Wheater signed a new one-year deal with the club with a contract extension option. Wheater's only goal of the 2017–2018 season came on the final day, scoring the second goal in a 3–2 win against Nottingham Forest, which kept Bolton in the Championship at the expense of Barnsley and Burton Albion. Bolton took up the contract extension option on 7 June 2018, extending his contract for another year For the 2018–2019 season, Wheater was captain. Wheater was released at the end of his contract in June 2019, however despite this he took part in most of Bolton's pre-season matches for the 2019–2020 season, turning down contract offers from Kilmarnock, Salford City, and Oldham Athletic as he wanted to stay at Bolton. Wheater had agreed a one-year contract, on severely reduced wages, to re-sign for Bolton, with a second year if he played in 30 matches, though Oldham owner Abdallah Lemsagam talked him out of it, stating that the lower wages would not be fair to his family.

=== Oldham Athletic ===
After originally turning Oldham down in an attempt to remain at Bolton, Wheater signed for local rivals Oldham Athletic on 1 August 2019 on a one-year deal with a second year option included, earning £4,000 per week. He made his debut two days later, starting in a 1–0 defeat against Forest Green Rovers and scored his first goal for Oldham on 24 August in a 2–1 away win against Cambridge United. On 29 August Wheater was named the Oldham captain. In January 2020 Bolton made a bid for Wheater, and owner Abdallah Lemsagam assumed Wheater would leave and join his former club, though Wheater decided to remain at Oldham. He finished the season with 35 appearances and 4 goals and his extra year option was activated as he needed to have played 20 matches to get the extra year. On 21 September 2020 Wheater, and teammate Gary Woods, were removed from the first team and forced to train with the youth team as Oldham had been trying to force them out of their contracts. On 12 March 2021, he was released.

=== Return to Darlington ===
Later that year, Wheater had surgery on a back problem, and did his rehabilitation with Darlington F.C.'s physiotherapist. When fit, he trained with his former club, and signed for them in late February 2022 on a non-contract basis. On 5 April 2022, Wheater signed a contract that would see him remain at the club until the end of the 2022–23 season. That season was disrupted by injuries, his contract was not renewed, and by its end he was contemplating retirement. He confirmed his retirement on 1 September.

== International career ==
Wheater represented England at under-16, under-17, under-18, under-19 and under-21 level. He played at the 2004 U17 European Championships and earned his debut under-21 call-up in August 2007 along with the uncapped Adam Johnson after impressing while on loan at Darlington. He was a regular in the 2009 U21 European Championship qualifying. In October 2008 he scored the equaliser against Wales in the first leg of the play-offs and England went on to win 3–2 and 5–4 on aggregate to qualify. He was supposed to be in the squad for the tournament but withdrew after sustaining an injury.

On 20 March 2008, Wheater was called up to the England squad by boss Fabio Capello, however he was not included in Capello's final 23.

On 15 October 2008, Wheater was called up into the England senior team as a replacement for John Terry when the England captain withdrew due to an injury picked up playing for Chelsea. Wheater's first real taste of senior international football came when he was named as a substitute for the games against France and Trinidad and Tobago in 2008, but he did not leave the bench on either occasion.

== Coaching career ==
After leaving Darlington Wheater, and fellow former footballer Stuart Wise, set up W2 Football Academy for boys and girls aged 5 to 11 with the duo coaching them. Though he had now started coaching, he stated he had not yet decided to end his playing career. It wasn't his first time coaching players, as he had previously done some academy coaching sessions whilst doing his coaching badges when he was a player for Bolton Wanderers. He changed his mind on 1 September however, and officially announced his retirement.

== Personal life ==
On 4 June 2011, Wheater married Laura Fountain at St Peter & St Paul Church in Stainton, Middlesbrough.

== Career statistics ==
As of end of 2022–23 season

Appearances and goals by club, season and competition
Club	Season	League			FA Cup		League Cup		Other		Total	
Club	Season	Division	Apps	Goals	Apps	Goals	Apps	Goals	Apps	Goals	Apps	Goals
Middlesbrough	2004–05	Premier League	0	0	0	0	0	0	1 (Note: Appearance in UEFA Cup)	0	1	0
Middlesbrough	2005–06	Premier League	6	0	0	0	0	0	0	0	6	0
Middlesbrough	2006–07	Premier League	2	1	0	0	0	0	0	0	2	1
Middlesbrough	2007–08	Premier League	34	3	4	1	2	0	0	0	40	4
Middlesbrough	2008–09	Premier League	32	1	5	1	1	0	0	0	38	2
Middlesbrough	2009–10	Championship	42	1	1	0	1	0	0	0	44	1
Middlesbrough	2010–11	Championship	24	3	0	0	2	0	0	0	26	3
Middlesbrough	Total		140	9	10	2	6	0	1	0	157	11
Doncaster Rovers (loan)	2005–06	League One	7	1	0	0	0	0	0	0	7	1
Wolverhampton Wanderers (loan)	2006–07	Championship	1	0	0	0	0	0	0	0	1	0
Darlington (loan)	2006–07	League One	15	2	0	0	0	0	1 (Note: Appearance in Football League Trophy)	0	16	2
Bolton Wanderers	2010–11	Premier League	7	0	4	0	0	0	0	0	11	0
Bolton Wanderers	2011–12	Premier League	24	2	4	1	2	0	0	0	30	3
Bolton Wanderers	2012–13	Championship	4	0	0	0	0	0	0	0	4	0
Bolton Wanderers	2013–14	Championship	23	1	0	0	0	0	0	0	23	1
Bolton Wanderers	2014–15	Championship	17	1	3	0	1	0	0	0	21	1
Bolton Wanderers	2015–16	Championship	28	1	1	0	0	0	0	0	29	1
Bolton Wanderers	2016–17	League One	43	9	4	0	0	0	2 (Note: Appearances in EFL Trophy)	0	49	9
Bolton Wanderers	2017–18	Championship	33	1	1	0	1	0	0	0	35	1
Bolton Wanderers	2018–19	Championship	33	0	1	0	0	0	0	0	34	0
Bolton Wanderers	Total		212	15	18	1	4	0	2	0	236	16
Oldham Athletic	2019–20	League Two	34	4	1	0	0	0	0	0	35	4
Oldham Athletic	2020–21	League Two	0	0	0	0	0	0	0	0	0	0
Oldham Athletic	Total		34	4	1	0	0	0	0	0	35	4
Darlington	2021–22	National League North	8	1	—		—		—		8	1
Darlington	2022–23	National League North	11	0	1	0	—		0	0	12	0
Darlington	Total		19	1	1	0	—		0	0	20	1
Career total			428	32	30	3	10	0	4	0	472	35

== Honours ==
Bolton Wanderers

- EFL League One runner-up: 2016–17

Individual

- PFA Fans' Player of the Year: 2016–17 League One
- PFA Team of the Year: 2016–17 League One
