= Michael Reiziger =

Dutch footballer (born 1973)

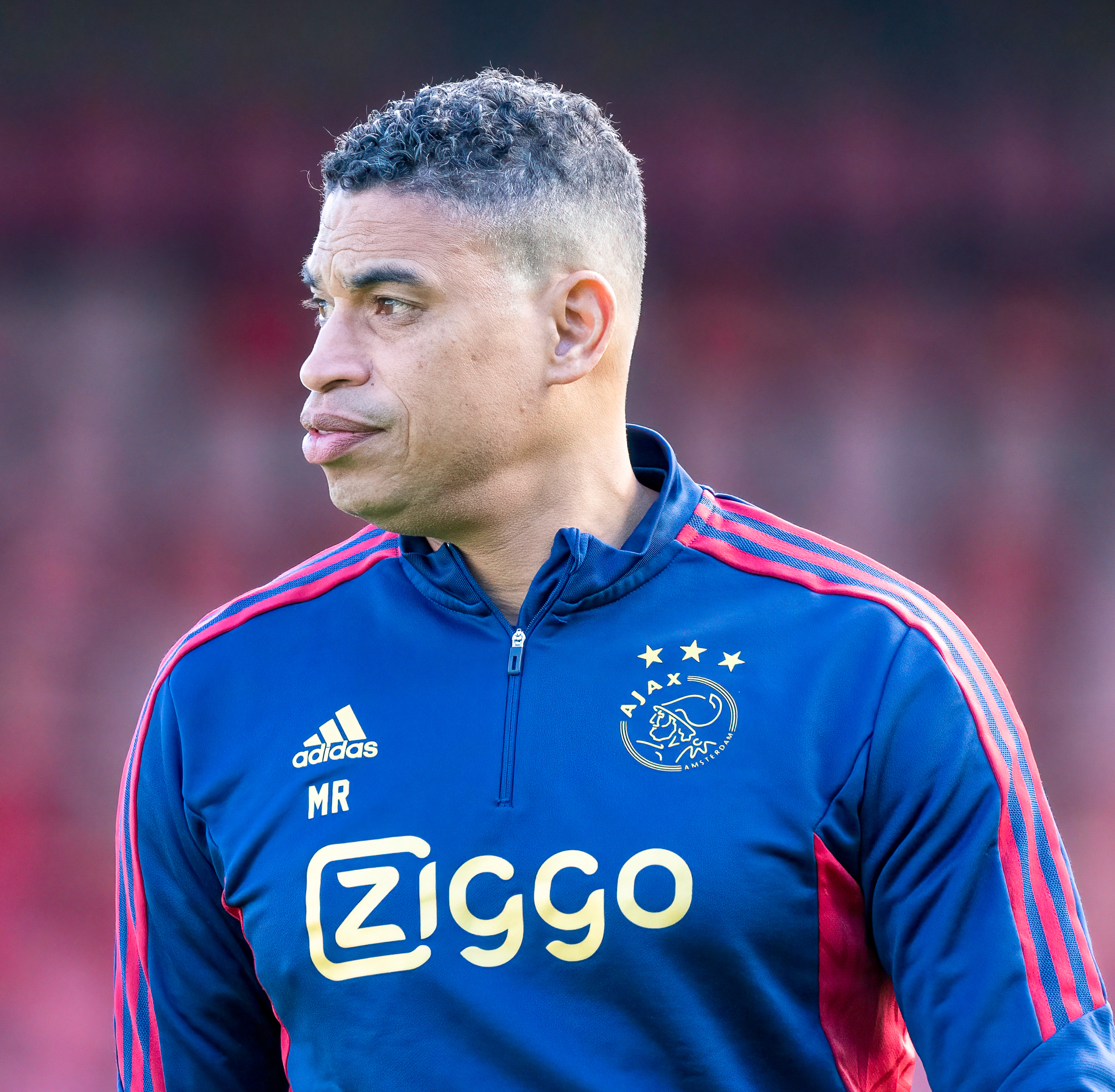
- Reiziger with Ajax as assistant coach in 2023

Personal information
- Full name: Michael John Reiziger
- Date of birth: 3 May 1973 (age 53)
- Place of birth: Amstelveen, North Holland, Netherlands
- Height: 1.78 m (5 ft 10 in)
- Position: Defender

Team information
- Current team: Netherlands U21 (Head Coach)

Youth career
- Sint Martinus
- 1985–1990: Ajax

Senior career*
Years	Team	Apps	(Gls)
1990–1996	Ajax	83	(1)
1992–1993	→ Volendam (loan)	10	(2)
1993–1994	→ Groningen (loan)	34	(6)
1996–1997	AC Milan	10	(0)
1997–2004	Barcelona	173	(0)
2004–2005	Middlesbrough	22	(1)
2005–2007	PSV	24	(1)
Total		356	(11)

International career
1994–2004	Netherlands	72	(1)

Managerial career
- 2017–2019: Jong Ajax
- 2017: Ajax (interim)
- 2023–: Netherlands U21
- * Club domestic league appearances and goals

Michael John Reiziger (Dutch pronunciation: [ˈmɑikəl dʑɔn ˈrɛizəɣər]; born 3 May 1973) is a Dutch former professional footballer who played mainly as a right back. He currently manages the Netherlands U21 team.

After making a name for himself at Ajax, with whom he won one Champions League, Reiziger went on to represent four teams in as many countries, notably Barcelona, for which he played 249 official games in seven years, as well as spells at A.C. Milan, Middlesbrough and PSV Eindhoven.

Reiziger represented the Netherlands national team for a full decade, competing at three European Championships and the 1998 World Cup and finishing fourth in the latter tournament.

== Playing career ==
=== Club ===
Born in Amstelveen, North Holland, to Surinamese parents, Reiziger started his career with hometown club Ajax, making his first-team debut at the age of 17 then serving two consecutive loan spells, with Volendam and Groningen; with the latter, in the 1993–94 season, he scored a career-best six goals while operating also as a midfielder.

Upon his return to Ajax, Reiziger established himself as a renowned defensive element, helping the side to, among other conquests, the 1994–95 edition of the UEFA Champions League. In 1996, he signed for A.C. Milan, but after a season marred by injury, he departed for Barcelona where he spent the following seven years, arriving at the same time as compatriot and former Ajax boss Louis van Gaal; though not an undisputed starter, he nonetheless featured heavily for the Catalans, making more than 200 overall appearances and helping to back-to-back La Liga titles.

In 2004, Reiziger moved to Middlesbrough on a Bosman transfer. He scored once in the league for Boro, against Aston Villa in December 2004. After another campaign plagued by physical problems, he left and returned to the Netherlands to see out his career at PSV Eindhoven (in his second year he won the Eredivisie, and was also reunited with Ajax, Barça and national teammate Patrick Kluivert, although the two rarely ever played).

=== International ===
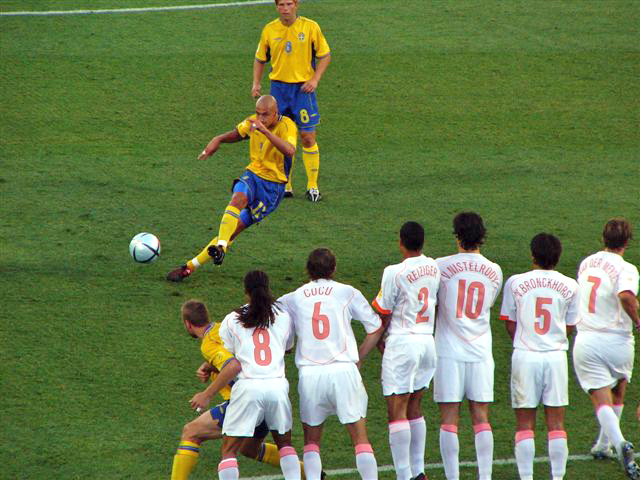
Reiziger (wearing No. 2) in the Dutch wall, facing a free kick against Sweden at Euro 2004

Reiziger made his debut for the Netherlands national team on 12 October 1994, against Norway. He played for his country at the UEFA Euro 1996, 1998 FIFA World Cup, Euro 2000 and Euro 2004, retiring from international play after the latter.

Shortly after signing for PSV, Reiziger said he would consider playing for the Netherlands again if the opportunity arose, but he was never recalled again, totalling 72 appearances in ten years.

== Coaching career ==
After retiring, Reiziger settled in Barcelona. He later went on to coach Sparta Rotterdam at youth level and, subsequently and successively, acted as assistant to Gert Kruys and Alex Pastoor.

On 20 June 2017, Reiziger returned to Ajax as manager of the reserves who competed in the Eerste Divisie, replacing Marcel Keizer. In his first season in charge he led the squad to the league title, but they were ineligible for promotion. He also acted as interim for the first team during one match after the dismissal of Keizer, defeating Willem II 3–1 at home. He was the assistant coach of Ajax’ first team, from 2019 until 2023.Since 2023 he is the manager of Netherlands under 21 team.

== Personal life ==
Reiziger's son, Gabriël (born 2005), also came through the Ajax youth system. He plays in 2026 for PEC Zwolle, with his contract expiring in June, 2028.

== Career statistics ==
=== Club ===
Appearances and goals by club, season and competition
Club	Season	League			National cup		Europe		Other		Total	
Club	Season	Division	Apps	Goals	Apps	Goals	Apps	Goals	Apps	Goals	Apps	Goals
Ajax	1990–91	Eredivisie	1	0	–		–		–		1	0
Ajax	1991–92	Eredivisie	1	0	–		–		–		1	0
Ajax	1992–93	Eredivisie	1	0	–		–		–		1	0
Ajax	1994–95	Eredivisie	34	0	3	0	11 (Note: Appearances in UEFA Champions League)	0	1 (Note: Appearance in Dutch Supercup)	0	49	0
Ajax	1995–96	Eredivisie	26	1	0	0	9	0	4 (Note: One appearance in Dutch Supercup, two appearances in UEFA Super Cup, one appearance in Intercontinental Cup)	0	39	1
Ajax	Total		63	1	3	0	20	0	5	0	91	1
Volendam (loan)	1992–93	Eredivisie	10	2	1	1	–		–		11	3
Groningen (loan)	1993–94	Eredivisie	34	6		0	–		–		34	6
A.C. Milan	1996–97	Serie A	10	0	4	0	3	0	1 (Note: Appearance in Supercoppa Italiana)	0	18	0
Barcelona	1997–98	La Liga	29	0	4	0	6	0	3 (Note: Two appearances in Supercopa de España, one appearance in UEFA Super Cup)	0	42	0
Barcelona	1998–99	La Liga	26	0	0	0	5	0	2 (Note: Appearances in Supercopa de España)	0	33	0
Barcelona	1999–2000	La Liga	29	0	4	0	11	0	2	0	46	0
Barcelona	2000–01	La Liga	25	0	7	0	8 (Note: Five appearances in UEFA Champions League, three appearances in UEFA Cup)	0	–		40	0
Barcelona	2001–02	La Liga	13	0	0	0	8	0	–		21	0
Barcelona	2002–03	La Liga	21	0	1	0	9	0	–		31	0
Barcelona	2003–04	La Liga	30	0	4	0	6 (Note: Appearances in UEFA Cup)	0	–		40	0
Barcelona	Total		173	0	20	0	53	0	7	0	253	0
Middlesbrough	2004–05	Premier League	18	1	1	0	6	0	0	0	25	1
Middlesbrough	2005–06	Premier League	4	0	0	0	0	0	0	0	4	0
Middlesbrough	Total		22	1	1	0	6	0	0	0	29	1
PSV	2005–06	Eredivisie	13	0	0	0	7	0	–		20	0
PSV	2006–07	Eredivisie	11	1	2	0	3	0	0	0	11	1
PSV	Total		24	1	2	0	10	0	0	0	36	1
Career total			337	11	31	1	92	0	13	0	473	12

=== International ===
Appearances and goals by national team and year
National team	Year	Apps	Goals
Netherlands	1994	1	0
Netherlands	1995	5	0
Netherlands	1996	9	0
Netherlands	1997	7	0
Netherlands	1998	11	1
Netherlands	1999	5	0
Netherlands	2000	8	0
Netherlands	2001	5	0
Netherlands	2002	6	0
Netherlands	2003	8	0
Netherlands	2004	7	0
Total		72	1

Score and result list the Netherlands' goal tally first, score column indicates score after Reiziger's goal.

International goal scored by Michael Reiziger
No.	Date	Venue	Opponent	Score	Result	Competition
1	18 November 1998	Parkstadion, Gelsenkirchen, Germany	Germany	1–0	1–1	Friendly

== Honours ==
=== Player ===
Ajax

- Eredivisie: 1994–95, 1995–96
- Dutch Supercup: 1994, 1995
- UEFA Champions League: 1994–95
- UEFA Super Cup: 1995
- Intercontinental Cup: 1995

Barcelona

- La Liga: 1997–98, 1998–99
- Copa del Rey: 1997–98
- UEFA Super Cup: 1997

PSV

- Eredivisie: 2005–06, 2006–07

=== Manager ===
Jong Ajax

- Eerste Divisie: 2017–18
