= Franck Queudrue =

French footballer (born 1978)

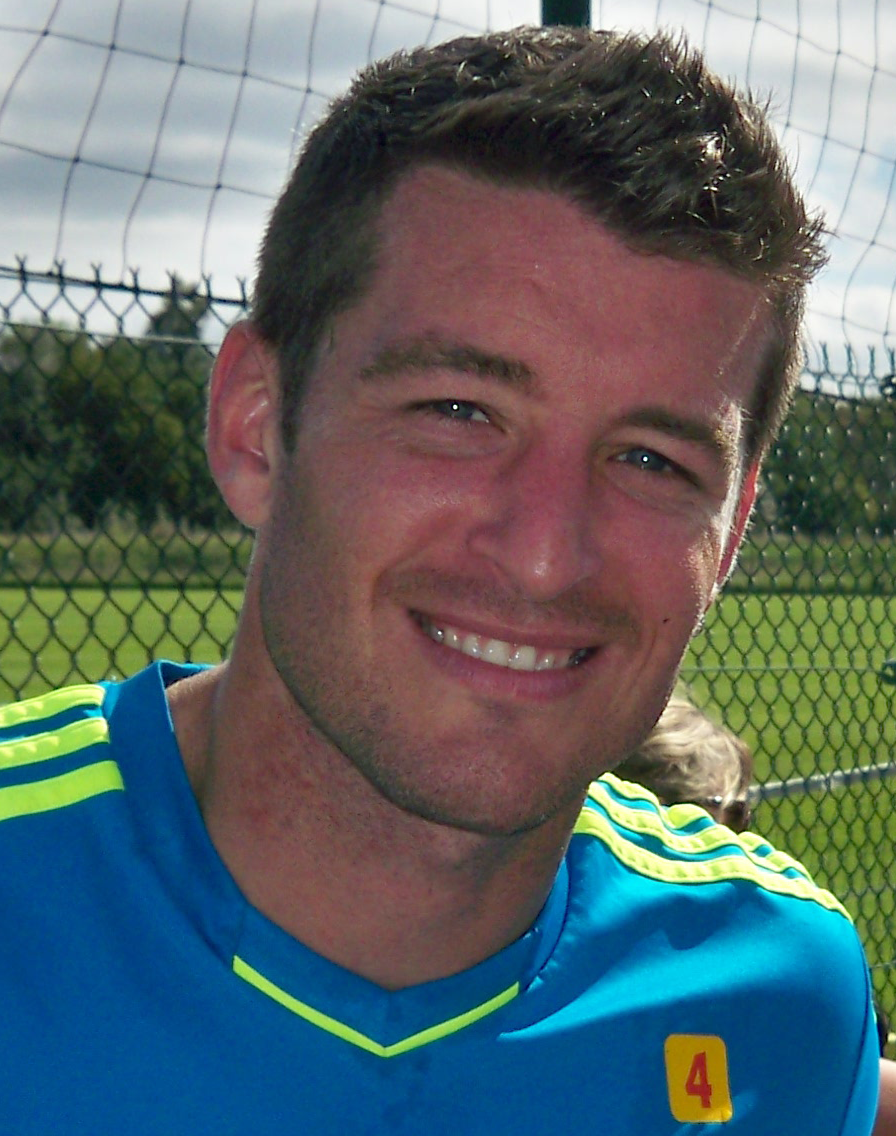
- Queudrue in training with Lens in 2011

Personal information
- Full name: Franck Roger Queudrue
- Date of birth: 27 August 1978 (age 48)
- Place of birth: Paris, France
- Height: 1.83 m (6 ft 0 in)
- Position: Left back

Youth career
- Lens

Senior career*
Years	Team	Apps	(Gls)
1997–1999	Lens B	41	(7)
1999–2002	Lens	42	(2)
2001–2002	→ Middlesbrough (loan)	28	(2)
2002–2006	Middlesbrough	122	(9)
2006–2007	Fulham	29	(1)
2007–2010	Birmingham City	47	(3)
2010	→ Colchester United (loan)	3	(0)
2010–2012	Lens	32	(2)
2012–2013	Red Star	25	(2)
Total		369	(28)

International career
2000	France B	1	(0)
- * Club domestic league appearances and goals

Franck Roger Queudrue (born 27 August 1978) is a French former professional footballer who played as a left back. He began his career with Lens, for whom he played in Ligue 1, and went on to play in the Premier League for Middlesbrough, Fulham and Birmingham City, and in the Football League for Colchester United. He returned to Lens in 2010, and joined Red Star on a free transfer in 2012. Queudrue retired at the end of the 2012–13 season.

Queudrue played one match for France at B international level, and considered playing for the Republic of Ireland until being deemed ineligible by FIFA to play for them.

== Early life ==
Franck Roger Queudrue was born on 27 August 1978 in Paris.

== Club career ==
=== Lens ===
Queudrue began his football career in the youth system of Lens. He made 41 appearances for the club's reserve team in the Championnat de France Amateur (CFA) from the 1997–98 season onwards, scoring seven goals, and stepped up to the first team during the 1999–2000 season. His debut in Ligue 1 came as a second-half substitute against Montpellier on 16 October 1999, and during that first season he played 16 league games, as well as six in the UEFA Cup. His first league goal came in his third appearance, a 90th-minute winner away to Marseille. He appeared frequently the following season, but made only two substitute appearances in 2001–02 before leaving for England on loan.

=== Middlesbrough ===
Queudrue joined English Premier League club Middlesbrough on loan in October 2001, and the deal was made permanent at the end of the season. He stayed until the summer of 2006. His preferred position was left-back, though he was comfortable at centre-back and, on certain occasions, played for Middlesbrough as a left or central midfielder. He was also renowned for his free kick and penalty converting ability.

He became popular with fans when he scored in his second game for the club – against North East rivals Sunderland. Queudrue impressed enough to earn a permanent move in May 2002 for a fee of £2.5 million. However, he was also recognised for his poor disciplinary record. His five yellow and three red cards in the 2002–03 season contributed hugely to Middlesbrough missing out on a place in the UEFA Cup through the fair play league – although, conversely, he was a major reason they were high enough up the league to be in contention. He was part of the Middlesbrough side who beat Bolton Wanderers to win the 2004 League Cup final. He also started for Middlesbrough in the 2006 UEFA Cup final which they lost 4–0 to Sevilla in Eindhoven.

In 2006, Queudrue announced that he was considering switching his nationality to British, after becoming eligible for UK citizenship. He had previously hoped to claim Irish citizenship, before revealing "unfortunately I am one generation out" to be eligible.

=== Fulham ===
Queudrue left for Fulham, signing a four-year contract in July 2006. Queudrue was a regular for Fulham under Chris Coleman, but he was made available for transfer by new manager Lawrie Sanchez, as he did not agree with Sanchez's long-ball game. He scored once in the league for Fulham, an injury time equaliser against Charlton Athletic.

=== Birmingham City ===
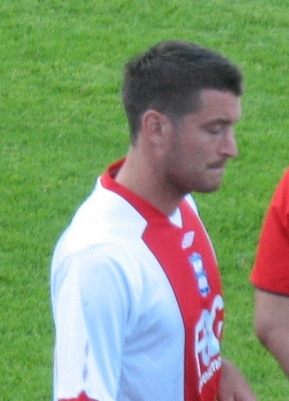
Queudrue playing for Birmingham City in 2009

On 3 August 2007, Queudrue signed a three-year contract with Birmingham City for a fee estimated at £2.5 million. After Birmingham's relegation at the end of the 2007–08 season, co-owner David Sullivan claimed he should have intervened to stop manager Steve Bruce "buying a pile of rubbish" and singled out Queudrue as "a major disappointment". Sullivan's apology the next day was accepted, but after Queudrue reported back late for pre-season training, he was told he could leave on a free transfer. However, he returned to the team the following season, produced man-of-the-match performances, and in October Sullivan issued a public apology in the match programme. Voted player of the season both by the fans and by the local newspaper, the Birmingham Mail, Queudrue also received personal message of congratulation from Sullivan via the club website.

In March 2010, Queudrue joined Colchester United of League One on loan for the remainder of the 2009–10 season, but injury restricted him to just three appearances. On his return to Birmingham, the club announced that he would be released when his contract expired at the end of June 2010.

=== Return to Lens ===
Queudrue had a trial at Peterborough United, but was reported to have joined Super League Greece club Panionios instead. However, he chose not to proceed with that move for family reasons, and after several weeks training with his first club, Lens, he rejoined them on 27 September until the end of the season.

=== Red Star ===
On 1 August 2012, Queudrue signed a two-year contract with Red Star on a free transfer. He scored his first goal for the club in a 3–0 win over Cherbourg, and his second in a 1–1 draw with Quevilly.

== International career ==
While a Lens player in 2000, Queudrue earned one cap for the France B national football team. He was hopeful of being able to represent Republic of Ireland as he believed he had an Irish grandfather, but it was later discovered he in fact had an Irish great-grandfather, thus making him ineligible.

== Career statistics ==
Appearances and goals by club, season and competition
Club	Season	League			National Cup		League Cup		Europe		Total	
Club	Season	Division	Apps	Goals	Apps	Goals	Apps	Goals	Apps	Goals	Apps	Goals
Lens	1999–2000	Division 1	16	1	1	0	1	0	6	0	24	1
Lens	2000–01	Division 1	24	1	1	0	0	0	–		25	1
Lens	2001–02	Division 1	2	0	0	0	0	0	–		2	0
Lens	Total		42	2	2	0	1	0	6	0	51	2
Middlesbrough (loan)	2001–02	Premier League	28	2	6	0	0	0	–		34	2
Middlesbrough	2002–03	Premier League	31	1	1	0	1	1	–		33	2
Middlesbrough	2003–04	Premier League	31	0	2	0	7	0	–		40	0
Middlesbrough	2004–05	Premier League	31	5	2	0	1	0	9	0	43	5
Middlesbrough	2005–06	Premier League	29	3	3	0	3	0	14	0	49	3
Middlesbrough	Total		150	11	14	0	12	1	23	0	199	12
Fulham	2006–07	Premier League	29	1	3	0	0	0	–		32	1
Birmingham City	2007–08	Premier League	16	0	1	0	0	0	–		17	0
Birmingham City	2008–09	Championship	25	3	1	0	1	0	–		27	3
Birmingham City	2009–10	Premier League	6	0	0	0	1	0	–		7	0
Birmingham City	Total		47	3	2	0	2	0	0	0	51	3
Colchester United (loan)	2007–08	League One	3	0	0	0	0	0	–		3	0
Lens	2010–11	Ligue 1	9	0	1	0	0	0	0	0	10	0
Lens	2011–12	Ligue 2	23	2	0	0	2	0	0	0	25	2
Lens	Total		32	2	1	0	2	0	0	0	35	2
Red Star	2012–13	National	25	2	0	0	0	0	0	0	25	2
Career total			328	21	22	0	17	1	29	0	396	22

== Honours ==
Middlesbrough

- Football League Cup: 2003–04
- UEFA Cup runner-up: 2005–06
