= 1996–97 Middlesbrough F.C. season =

Middlesbrough
1996–97 season
- Chairman: Steve Gibson
- Manager: Bryan Robson
- Stadium: Riverside Stadium
- Premier League: 19th (relegated)
- FA Cup: Runners-up
- League Cup: Runners-up
- Top goalscorer: League: Ravanelli (16); All: Ravanelli (31)
- Highest home attendance: 30,215 (vs. Tottenham Hotspur, 19 October)
- Lowest home attendance: 17,136 (vs. Hereford United, 18 September)
- Average home league attendance: 28,724

During the 1996–97 English football season, Middlesbrough competed in the Premier League (known as the FA Carling Premiership for sponsorship reasons). Despite reaching the finals of both domestic cup competitions, Middlesbrough were relegated from the Premier League in 19th place (although this came after a 3-point deduction for postponing a fixture against Blackburn Rovers on 21 December 1996).

== Season summary ==
The multi-million pound signings of Brazilian midfielder Emerson and Italian striker Fabrizio Ravanelli suggested that Middlesbrough could compete with the very best after finishing 12th the previous season, but ahead lay quite a unique season which ultimately ended in disappointment; though, on the goalscoring front, Middlesbrough's games were undeniably entertaining to watch, as in total, 111 goals were witnessed, the fourth highest total of goals for and against within Premier League clubs' matches. The season though started brightly with a thrilling 3–3 draw against Liverpool with Ravanelli scoring a hat-trick on his debut. The next two home games were impressively won: 4–1 against West Ham United and 4–0 against Coventry City (with Ravanelli and Juninho scoring two goals each in that match). Their season's first away win at Everton saw them rise as high as fourth in the table; however, beginning from their 2–0 home defeat to title challengers Arsenal, they were not to win another match in 12 attempts until Boxing Day, winning the return fixture against the Toffees 4–2.

By Christmas, Middlesbrough were deep in relegation trouble, despite Ravanelli proving himself as one of the league's top goalscorers. Added to this, Middlesbrough were faced with the wrath of the Football Association for postponing a fixture against Blackburn Rovers at short notice. The club's officials insisted that manager Bryan Robson had been unable to field a team due to a severe injury and illness crisis among his players, but this did not prevent the Football Association from docking the club 3 points.

Middlesbrough managed to put together a good run of results and look like decent bets for survival, but the Football Association's refusal to restore Middlesbrough's 3 points counted against them and a 1–1 draw at Leeds United on the final day of the season, when they needed a win, resulted in relegation that would have been avoided (at the expense of Coventry City) if the points had not been deducted.

Middlesbrough also hit the headlines with two brilliant cup runs. As a club who had never won a major trophy or even reached a domestic cup final before, history was made in February when Middlesbrough reached the League Cup final. They drew 1–1 with Leicester City at Wembley in the first match, but lost the replay 1–0 at Hillsborough. Two months later, they took on Chelsea in the FA Cup final, but lost 2–0. Therefore, they became the first team to finish in the last two of both major cup competitions whilst also being relegated - surpassing Crystal Palace's distinction (attained in 1995) of finishing in the last four of both major cup competitions while being relegated in the league.

== Final league table ==
Pos	Team	Pld	W	D	L	GF	GA	GD	Pts	Qualification or relegation
16	Southampton	38	10	11	17	50	56	−6	41	
17	Coventry City	38	9	14	15	38	54	−16	41	
18	Sunderland (R)	38	10	10	18	35	53	−18	40	Relegation to the Football League First Division
19	Middlesbrough (R)	38	10	12	16	51	60	−9	39 (Note: Middlesbrough were docked three points for failing to fulfill their original fixture at Blackburn Rovers on 21 December 1996.)	Relegation to the Football League First Division
20	Nottingham Forest (R)	38	6	16	16	31	59	−28	34	Relegation to the Football League First Division

Source: Premier League
Rules for classification: 1) points; 2) goal difference; 3) number of goals scored.
(R) Relegated
Notes:

Results summary

Overall								Home						Away					
Pld	W	D	L	GF	GA	GD	Pts	W	D	L	GF	GA	GD	W	D	L	GF	GA	GD
38	10	12	16	51	60	−9	39^{3}	8	5	6	34	25	+9	2	7	10	17	35	−18

Source: Statto

Results by round

Round	1	2	3	4	5	6	7	8	9	10	11	12	13	14	15	16	17	18	19	20	21	22	23	24	25	26	27	28	29	30	31	32	33	34	35	36	37	38
Ground	H	A	A	H	H	A	H	A	A	H	H	A	A	H	A	H	H	A	H	A	A	H	H	A	H	A	H	A	H	H	H	A	H	A	H	A	A	A
Result	D	L	D	W	W	W	L	L	D	L	D	L	L	D	L	L	D	L	W	L	L	L	W	D	L	L	W	W	W	W	D	D	L	L	W	D	D	D
Position	7	14	14	9	7	4	8	9	8	11	12	15	15	15	16	16	16	16	17	17	18	20	20	20	20	20	20	20	19	17	17	18	19	19	19	19	18	19

Source: Statto.com
A = Away; H = Home; W = Win; D = Draw; L = Loss

== Results ==
Middlesbrough's score comes first

=== Legend ===
Win	Draw	Loss

=== FA Premier League ===
Date	Opponent	Venue	Result	Attendance	Scorers
17 August 1996	Liverpool	H	3–3	30,039	Ravanelli (3, 1 pen)
21 August 1996	Chelsea	A	0–1	28,272	
24 August 1996	Nottingham Forest	A	1–1	24,705	Juninho
4 September 1996	West Ham United	H	4–1	30,060	Emerson, Mustoe, Ravanelli, Stamp
7 September 1996	Coventry City	H	4–0	29,811	Ravanelli (2), Juninho (2)
14 September 1996	Everton	A	2–1	39,250	Barmby, Juninho
21 September 1996	Arsenal	H	0–2	29,629	
28 September 1996	Southampton	A	0–4	15,230	
14 October 1996	Sunderland	A	2–2	20,936	Emerson, Ravanelli
19 October 1996	Tottenham Hotspur	H	0–3	30,215	
26 October 1996	Wimbledon	H	0–0	29,758	
3 November 1996	Newcastle United	A	1–3	36,577	Beck
17 November 1996	Derby County	A	1–2	17,350	Ravanelli
23 November 1996	Manchester United	H	2–2	30,063	Ravanelli, Hignett (pen)
30 November 1996	Aston Villa	A	0–1	39,053	
3 December 1996	Leicester City	H	0–2	29,709	
7 December 1996	Leeds United	H	0–0	30,018	
14 December 1996	Liverpool	A	1–5	39,491	Fjørtoft
26 December 1996	Everton	H	4–2	29,673	Hignett, Blackmore, Juninho (2)
28 December 1996	Coventry City	A	0–3	20,617	
1 January 1997	Arsenal	A	0–2	37,573	
11 January 1997	Southampton	H	0–1	29,509	
18 January 1997	Sheffield Wednesday	H	4–2	29,485	Ravanelli (pen), Festa, Emerson (pen), Juninho
1 February 1997	Wimbledon	A	1–1	15,046	Mustoe
22 February 1997	Newcastle United	H	0–1	30,063	
1 March 1997	Sheffield Wednesday	A	1–3	28,206	Mustoe
5 March 1997	Derby County	H	6–1	29,739	Kinder, Ravanelli (3), Hignett, Beck
15 March 1997	Leicester City	A	3–1	20,561	Blackmore, Juninho, Beck
19 March 1997	Blackburn Rovers	H	2–1	29,891	Juninho, Ravanelli
22 March 1997	Chelsea	H	1–0	29,811	Juninho
24 March 1997	Nottingham Forest	H	1–1	29,888	Beck
9 April 1997	West Ham United	A	0–0	23,988	
19 April 1997	Sunderland	H	0–1	30,106	
24 April 1997	Tottenham Hotspur	A	0–1	29,947	
3 May 1997	Aston Villa	H	3–2	30,074	Ravanelli (2, 1 pen), Beck
5 May 1997	Manchester United	A	3–3	54,489	Juninho, Emerson, Hignett
8 May 1997	Blackburn Rovers	A	0–0	27,411	
11 May 1997	Leeds United	A	1–1	38,567	Juninho

=== FA Cup ===
Round	Date	Opponent	Venue	Result	Attendance	Goalscorers
R3	4 January 1997	Chester City	H	6–0	18,684	Ravanelli (2), Hignett, Cox, Beck, Stamp
R4	25 January 1997	Hednesford Town	A	3–2	27,511	Lambert (own goal), Fjørtoft, Ravanelli
R5	15 February 1997	Manchester City	A	1–0	30,462	Juninho
QF	8 March 1997	Derby County	A	2–0	17,567	Juninho, Ravanelli
SF	13 April 1997	Chesterfield	N	3–3	49,640	Ravanelli, Hignett (pen), Festa
SFR	22 April 1997	Chesterfield	N	3–0	30,339	Beck, Ravanelli, Emerson
F	17 May 1997	Chelsea	N	0–2	79,160	

=== League Cup ===
Round	Date	Opponent	Venue	Result	Attendance	Goalscorers
R2 1st Leg	18 September 1996	Hereford United	H	7–0	17,136	Ravanelli (4, 1 pen), Emerson, Branco, Fleming
R2 2nd Leg	24 September 1996	Hereford United	A	3–0 (won 10–0 on agg)	4,522	Beck, Stamp, Branco
R3	23 October 1996	Huddersfield Town	H	5–1	26,615	Juninho, Emerson, Ravanelli (2), Beck
R4	27 November 1996	Newcastle United	H	3–1	29,831	Whyte, Beck, Ravanelli
QF	8 January 1997	Liverpool	H	2–1	28,670	Hignett, Vickers
SF 1st Leg	26 February 1997	Stockport County	A	2–0	11,778	Beck, Ravanelli
SF 2nd Leg	12 March 1997	Stockport County	H	0–1 (won 2–1 on agg)	29,633	
F	6 April 1997	Leicester City	N	1–1 (a.e.t.)	76,757	Ravanelli
FR	16 April 1997	Leicester City	N	0–1 (a.e.t.)	39,428	

== First-team squad ==
Squad at end of season

Note: Flags indicate national team as defined under FIFA eligibility rules; some limited exceptions apply. Players may hold more than one non-FIFA nationality.

No.	Pos.	Nation	Player
2	DF	ENG	Neil Cox
3	DF	SCO	Derek Whyte
4	DF	ENG	Steve Vickers
5	DF	ENG	Nigel Pearson (captain)
6	MF	BRA	Emerson
7	DF	SVK	Vladimír Kinder
8	MF	ENG	Robbie Mustoe
9	FW	DEN	Mikkel Beck
10	MF	BRA	Juninho
11	FW	ITA	Fabrizio Ravanelli
12	MF	IRL	Alan Moore
13	GK	ENG	Gary Walsh
14	DF	IRL	Curtis Fleming
69	DF	ENG	Antony Cottrell
16	MF	ENG	Bryan Robson (player-manager)
17	DF	WAL	Clayton Blackmore

No.	Pos.	Nation	Player
18	DF	ITA	Gianluca Festa
19	GK	AUS	Mark Schwarzer
20	MF	ENG	Phil Stamp
21	MF	ENG	Craig Hignett
22	DF	ENG	Craig Liddle
24	FW	ENG	Chris Freestone
25	GK	ENG	Ben Roberts
26	DF	IRL	Chris Morris
27	DF	ENG	Michael Barron
28	DF	ENG	Viv Anderson
30	DF	BRA	Branco
31	DF	ENG	Alan White
32	FW	ENG	Andy Campbell
33	MF	ENG	Mark Summerbell
34	MF	IRL	Keith O'Halloran
35	MF	ENG	Anthony Ormerod

=== Left club during season ===
Note: Flags indicate national team as defined under FIFA eligibility rules; some limited exceptions apply. Players may hold more than one non-FIFA nationality.

No.	Pos.	Nation	Player
1	GK	ENG	Alan Miller (to West Bromwich Albion)
7	MF	ENG	Nick Barmby (to Everton)
18	MF	IRL	Graham Kavanagh (to Stoke City)

No.	Pos.	Nation	Player
19	FW	SCO	John Hendrie (to Barnsley)
23	FW	NOR	Jan-Åge Fjørtoft (to Sheffield United)
29	MF	ENG	Jamie Pollock (to Bolton Wanderers)

=== Reserve squad ===
Note: Flags indicate national team as defined under FIFA eligibility rules; some limited exceptions apply. Players may hold more than one non-FIFA nationality.

No.	Pos.	Nation	Player
-	DF	IRL	Jason Gavin
-	DF	ENG	Craig Harrison

No.	Pos.	Nation	Player
-	MF	IRL	Micky Cummins
-	MF	ENG	Andrew Swalwell

=== Appearances and goals ===
No.	Pos	Nat	Player	Total		Premier League		FA Cup		League Cup	
No.	Pos	Nat	Player	Apps	Goals	Apps	Goals	Apps	Goals	Apps	Goals
Goalkeepers
13	GK	(England) ENG	Gary Walsh	16	0	12	0	1	0	3	0
19	GK	(Australia) AUS	Mark Schwarzer	10	0	7	0	0	0	3	0
25	GK	(England) ENG	Ben Roberts	18	0	9+1	0	6	0	1+1	0
Defenders
2	DF	(England) ENG	Neil Cox	41	1	29+2	0	3	1	7	0
3	DF	(Scotland) SCO	Derek Whyte	29	1	20+1	0	3+1	0	3+1	1
4	DF	(England) ENG	Steve Vickers	41	1	26+3	0	5+1	0	5+1	1
5	DF	(England) ENG	Nigel Pearson	26	0	17+1	0	3	0	5	0
7	DF	(Slovakia) SVK	Vladimír Kinder	10	1	4+2	1	2+1	0	1	0
14	DF	(Republic of Ireland) IRL	Curtis Fleming	42	1	30	0	4+1	0	7	1
15	DF	(England) ENG	Phil Whelan	11	0	9	0	0	0	2	0
17	DF	(Wales) WAL	Clayton Blackmore	24	2	14+2	2	4+1	0	2+1	0
18	DF	(Italy) ITA	Gianluca Festa	22	2	13	1	5	1	4	0
22	DF	(England) ENG	Craig Liddle	6	0	5	0	1	0	0	0
26	DF	(Republic of Ireland) IRL	Chris Morris	6	0	3+1	0	0	0	2	0
30	DF	(Brazil) BRA	Branco	4	2	1+1	0	0	0	2	2
Midfielders
6	MF	(Brazil) BRA	Emerson	45	7	32	4	5	1	8	2
8	MF	(England) ENG	Robbie Mustoe	46	3	31	3	7	0	8	0
10	MF	(Brazil) BRA	Juninho	48	15	34+1	12	6	2	7	1
12	MF	(Republic of Ireland) IRL	Alan Moore	23	0	10+7	0	1+1	0	1+3	0
16	MF	(England) ENG	Bryan Robson	1	0	1	0	0	0	0	0
20	MF	(England) ENG	Phil Stamp	34	3	15+9	1	3+1	1	4+2	1
21	MF	(England) ENG	Craig Hignett	34	7	19+3	4	6	2	6	1
33	MF	(England) ENG	Mark Summerbell	2	0	0+2	0	0	0	0	0
Forwards
9	FW	(Denmark) DEN	Mikkel Beck	38	11	22+3	5	5+1	2	6+1	4
11	FW	(Italy) ITA	Fabrizio Ravanelli	48	31	33	16	7	6	8	9
24	FW	(England) ENG	Chris Freestone	3	0	0+3	0	0	0	0	0
32	FW	(England) ENG	Andy Campbell	3	0	0+3	0	0	0	0	0
Players transferred out during the season
1	GK	(England) ENG	Alan Miller	12	0	10	0	0	0	2	0
7	MF	(England) ENG	Nick Barmby	10	1	10	1	0	0	0	0
19	FW	(Scotland) SCO	John Hendrie	2	0	0	0	0	0	1+1	0
23	FW	(Norway) NOR	Jan-Åge Fjørtoft	8	2	2+3	1	0+2	1	1	0

Last updated: 30 May 1997
