= 1995–96 Middlesbrough F.C. season =

Middlesbrough F.C.
1995–96 season
- Chairman: Steve Gibson
- Manager: Bryan Robson
- Stadium: Riverside Stadium
- FA Premier League: 12th
- FA Cup: Fourth round
- League Cup: Fourth round
- Top goalscorer: League: Nick Barmby (7); All: Nick Barmby (9)
- Highest home attendance: 30,011 vs Newcastle United (10 February 1996, FA Premier League)
- Lowest home attendance: 13,280 vs Rotherham United (20 September 1995, League Cup)
- Average home league attendance: 29,283
Home colours	Away colours

During the 1995–96 English football season, Middlesbrough F.C. competed in the FA Premier League.

== Season summary ==
Middlesbrough returned to the top flight of English football, and recorded a solid mid-table finish under player-manager Bryan Robson. It was also Boro's first season at new home Riverside Stadium, following the decision to move out from Ayresome Park, once the Taylor report banned standing on British football stadia.

New to the Boro side for the season were record signing Nick Barmby, goalkeeper Gary Walsh (who succeeded Alan Miller as the club's regular goalkeeper) and young defender Phil Whelan. Soon after the beginning of the season, Boro paid nearly £5million for 22-year-old Brazilian forward Juninho.

Boro had peaked at fourth in the FA Premier League in late October after losing just one of their opening 10 games, but the next four months brought just three wins and included an eight-match losing run which posed the threat of relegation to a side who had previously been challenging for a UEFA Cup place. Boro eventually secured survival by a margin of five points.

== Final league table ==
Pos	Team	Pld	W	D	L	GF	GA	GD	Pts
10	West Ham United	38	14	9	15	43	52	−9	51
11	Chelsea	38	12	14	12	46	44	+2	50
12	Middlesbrough	38	11	10	17	35	50	−15	43
13	Leeds United	38	12	7	19	40	57	−17	43
14	Wimbledon	38	10	11	17	55	70	−15	41

Source: Premier League
Rules for classification: 1) points; 2) goal difference; 3) number of goals scored.

== Results ==
Middlesbrough's score comes first

=== Legend ===
Win	Draw	Loss

=== FA Premier League ===
Date	Opponent	Venue	Result	Attendance	Scorers
20 August 1995	Arsenal	A	1–1	37,308	Barmby
26 August 1995	Chelsea	H	2–0	28,286	Hignett, Fjørtoft
30 August 1995	Newcastle United	A	0–1	36,500	
9 September 1995	Bolton Wanderers	A	1–1	18,376	Hignett
12 September 1995	Southampton	H	0–0	29,181	
16 September 1995	Coventry City	H	2–1	27,882	Vickers, Fjørtoft
23 September 1995	Manchester City	A	1–0	25,865	Barmby
30 September 1995	Blackburn Rovers	H	2–0	29,462	Barmby, Hignett
15 October 1995	Sheffield Wednesday	A	1–0	21,177	Hignett (pen)
21 October 1995	Queens Park Rangers	H	1–0	29,293	Hignett (pen)
28 October 1995	Manchester United	A	0–2	36,580	
4 November 1995	Leeds United	H	1–1	29,467	Fjørtoft
18 November 1995	Wimbledon	A	0–0	13,780	
21 November 1995	Tottenham Hotspur	H	0–1	29,487	
25 November 1995	Liverpool	H	2–1	29,390	Cox, Barmby
2 December 1995	Queens Park Rangers	A	1–1	17,546	Morris
9 December 1995	Manchester City	H	4–1	29,469	Barmby (2), Stamp, Juninho
16 December 1995	Blackburn Rovers	A	0–1	27,996	
23 December 1995	West Ham United	H	4–2	28,640	Fjørtoft, Cox, Morris, Hendrie
26 December 1995	Everton	A	0–4	40,091	
30 December 1995	Nottingham Forest	A	0–1	27,027	
1 January 1996	Aston Villa	H	0–2	28,535	
13 January 1996	Arsenal	H	2–3	29,359	Juninho, Stamp
20 January 1996	Southampton	A	1–2	15,151	Barmby
4 February 1996	Chelsea	A	0–5	21,060	
10 February 1996	Newcastle United	H	1–2	30,011	Beresford (own goal)
17 February 1996	Bolton Wanderers	H	1–4	29,354	Pollock
24 February 1996	Coventry City	A	0–0	18,810	
2 March 1996	Everton	H	0–2	29,807	
9 March 1996	West Ham United	A	0–2	23,850	
16 March 1996	Nottingham Forest	H	1–1	29,392	Mustoe
19 March 1996	Aston Villa	A	0–0	23,933	
30 March 1996	Leeds United	A	1–0	31,778	Kavanagh (pen)
5 April 1996	Sheffield Wednesday	H	3–1	29,751	Fjørtoft (2), Freestone
8 April 1996	Tottenham Hotspur	A	1–1	32,036	Whelan
13 April 1996	Wimbledon	H	1–2	29,192	Fleming
27 April 1996	Liverpool	A	0–1	40,782	
5 May 1996	Manchester United	H	0–3	29,921	

=== FA Cup ===
Round	Date	Opponent	Venue	Result	Attendance	Goalscorers
R3	6 January 1996	Notts County	A	2–1	12,621	Pollock, Barmby
R4	7 February 1996	Wimbledon	H	0–0	28,915	
R4R	13 February 1996	Wimbledon	A	0–1	5,520	

=== League Cup ===
Round	Date	Opponent	Venue	Result	Attendance	Goalscorers
R2 1st Leg	20 September 1995	Rotherham United	H	2–1	13,280	Mustoe, Fjørtoft
R2 2nd Leg	3 October 1995	Rotherham United	A	1–0 (won 3–1 on agg)	6,867	Vickers
R3	25 October 1995	Crystal Palace	A	2–2	11,873	Barmby 15'; Hignett 20'
R3R	8 November 1995	Crystal Palace	H	2–0	16,150	Hignett, Fjørtoft
R4	29 November 1995	Birmingham City	H	0–0	28,031	
R4R	20 December 1995	Birmingham City	A	0–2	19,878	

== Squad ==
Note: Flags indicate national team as defined under FIFA eligibility rules; some limited exceptions apply. Players may hold more than one non-FIFA nationality.

No.	Pos.	Nation	Player
1	GK	ENG	Alan Miller
2	DF	ENG	Neil Cox
3	DF	IRL	Chris Morris
4	DF	ENG	Steve Vickers
5	DF	ENG	Nigel Pearson
6	DF	SCO	Derek Whyte
7	MF	ENG	Nick Barmby
8	MF	ENG	Jamie Pollock
9	FW	NOR	Jan Åge Fjørtoft
10	FW	SCO	John Hendrie
11	MF	ENG	Robbie Mustoe
12	MF	IRL	Alan Moore
13	GK	ENG	Gary Walsh
14	DF	IRL	Curtis Fleming
15	DF	ENG	Phil Whelan
16	MF	ENG	Bryan Robson (player-manager)
17	DF	WAL	Clayton Blackmore

No.	Pos.	Nation	Player
18	MF	IRL	Graham Kavanagh
19	FW	BOL	Jaime Moreno
20	MF	ENG	Phil Stamp
21	MF	ENG	Craig Hignett
22	DF	ENG	Craig Liddle
23	GK	ENG	Ben Roberts
24	FW	ENG	Chris Freestone
25	MF	BRA	Juninho
26	MF	IRL	Keith O'Halloran
27	DF	ENG	Michael Barron
28	DF	ENG	Viv Anderson
29	FW	ENG	Paul Wilkinson
30	DF	BRA	Branco
31	DF	ENG	Alan White
32	FW	ENG	Andy Campbell
33	MF	ENG	Mark Summerbell

=== Reserve squad ===
Note: Flags indicate national team as defined under FIFA eligibility rules; some limited exceptions apply. Players may hold more than one non-FIFA nationality.

No.	Pos.	Nation	Player
—	MF	IRL	Micky Cummins
