= 2001–02 Middlesbrough F.C. season =

Middlesbrough
2001–02 season
- Chairman: Steve Gibson
- Manager: Steve McClaren
- Premier League: 12th
- FA Cup: Semi-final
- League Cup: Third round
- Top goalscorer: League: Alen Bokšić (8); All: Alen Bokšić (8)
- Highest home attendance: 34,358 v Manchester United (Premier League); Away: 67,683 v Manchester United (Premier League)
- Lowest home attendance: 3,918 v Northampton Town (League Cup); Away: 6,885 v Wimbledon (F.A. Cup)
- Average home league attendance: 28,459
Home colours	Away colours

During the 2001–02 season, Middlesbrough participated in the FA Premier League.

== Kit ==
Middlesbrough were again sponsored by BT Cellnet for the 2001–02 season. The team's strip was produced by Errea. The home shirt consisted of a plain red shirt, red shorts and red socks with white trim. The away strip consisted of blue and black striped shirts, plain black shorts and black socks.

== Final league table ==
Pos	Team	Pld	W	D	L	GF	GA	GD	Pts	Qualification or relegation
10	Blackburn Rovers	38	12	10	16	55	51	+4	46	Qualification for the UEFA Cup first round (Note: Blackburn Rovers qualified for the UEFA Cup as League Cup winners.)
11	Southampton	38	12	9	17	46	54	−8	45	
12	Middlesbrough	38	12	9	17	35	47	−12	45	
13	Fulham	38	10	14	14	36	44	−8	44	Qualification for the Intertoto Cup second round
14	Charlton Athletic	38	10	14	14	38	49	−11	44	

Source: Premier League
Rules for classification: 1) points; 2) goal difference; 3) number of goals scored.
Notes:

Results summary

Overall								Home						Away					
Pld	W	D	L	GF	GA	GD	Pts	W	D	L	GF	GA	GD	W	D	L	GF	GA	GD
38	12	9	17	35	47	−12	45	7	5	7	23	26	−3	5	4	10	12	21	−9

Source: Statto

Results by round

Round	1	2	3	4	5	6	7	8	9	10	11	12	13	14	15	16	17	18	19	20	21	22	23	24	25	26	27	28	29	30	31	32	33	34	35	36	37	38
Ground	H	A	A	H	H	A	A	H	A	H	A	H	A	H	A	A	H	A	A	H	A	H	A	H	H	H	A	H	A	H	A	H	A	H	H	A	H	A
Result	L	L	L	L	W	W	D	L	D	W	L	W	D	D	W	L	L	L	L	W	L	D	W	D	D	W	L	W	D	L	W	D	W	W	L	L	L	L
Position	19	19	19	20	19	11	12	14	14	13	14	13	13	14	12	15	16	16	16	16	17	18	14	16	16	11	12	12	13	13	10	11	10	9	9	9	10	12

Source: Statto.com
A = Away; H = Home; W = Win; D = Draw; L = Loss

== Notable events ==
- Steve McClaren's first season in charge of Boro.
- Boro lost their first four matches in the league but then recover to only lose 2 in 11 games.
- 1–0 win away at Manchester United one of the high points of the league campaign.
- Strong FA Cup run ended in the semi-finals with a 1–0 loss to Arsenal at Old Trafford. A Gianluca Festa own goal is the difference between the two sides.

== Squad ==
Squad at end of season

Note: Flags indicate national team as defined under FIFA eligibility rules; some limited exceptions apply. Players may hold more than one non-FIFA nationality.

No.	Pos.	Nation	Player
1	GK	AUS	Mark Schwarzer
3	DF	ENG	Dean Gordon
5	DF	ITA	Gianluca Festa
6	DF	ENG	Gareth Southgate
7	MF	ENG	Robbie Mustoe
8	FW	SVK	Szilárd Németh
9	MF	ENG	Paul Ince (captain)
10	FW	ITA	Benito Carbone (on loan from Bradford City)
11	FW	CRO	Alen Bokšić
12	MF	ENG	Jonathan Greening
14	MF	FRA	Mickaël Debève
15	GK	ENG	Marlon Beresford
16	FW	CMR	Joseph-Désiré Job (Note: Job was born in Vénissieux, France, but also qualified to represent Cameroon internationally and made his international debut for Cameroon in November 1997.)
17	DF	ENG	Ugo Ehiogu
20	FW	ENG	Dean Windass
21	MF	ENG	Mark Wilson
22	MF	ENG	Mark Summerbell

No.	Pos.	Nation	Player
23	MF	ARG	Carlos Marinelli
24	MF	ENG	Phil Stamp
25	GK	WAL	Mark Crossley
26	FW	ENG	Noel Whelan
27	DF	SCO	Robbie Stockdale (Note: Stockdale was born in Redcar, England, but also qualified to represent Scotland internationally and made his international debut for Scotland in April 2002.)
28	DF	ENG	Colin Cooper
29	DF	IRL	Jason Gavin
30	DF	ENG	Stuart Parnaby
31	MF	AUS	Luke Wilkshire
32	MF	SCO	Allan Johnston
33	DF	ENG	David Murphy
34	MF	ENG	Stewart Downing
36	MF	ENG	Mark Hudson
37	DF	FRA	Franck Queudrue (on loan from Lens)
38	GK	ENG	Sam Russell
39	GK	AUS	Brad Jones
—	MF	ENG	Anthony Ormerod

=== Left club during season ===
Note: Flags indicate national team as defined under FIFA eligibility rules; some limited exceptions apply. Players may hold more than one non-FIFA nationality.

No.	Pos.	Nation	Player
2	DF	IRL	Curtis Fleming (Note: Fleming was born in Manchester, England, but was raised in Dublin, the Republic of Ireland, and made his international debut for the Republic of Ireland in April 1996.) (to Crystal Palace)
4	DF	ENG	Steve Vickers (to Birmingham City)
10	FW	ENG	Brian Deane (to Leicester City)
12	MF	IRL	Keith O'Neill (to Coventry City)
14	MF	AUS	Paul Okon (on loan to Watford)
18	FW	ENG	Andy Campbell (to Cardiff City)

No.	Pos.	Nation	Player
19	FW	COL	Hamilton Ricard (on loan to CSKA Sofia)
32	DF	ENG	Steve Baker (to Scarborough)
34	GK	SCO	Chris Bennion (Scunthorpe United)
35	MF	SCO	Sean Kilgannon (Dunfermline Athletic)
—	MF	ENG	Stephen Brackstone (to York City)

== Transfers ==
=== In ===
Date	Player	Previous club	Fee	Ref
1 July 2001	(Slovakia) Szilárd Németh	(Slovakia) Inter Bratislava	Free	
11 July 2001	(England) Gareth Southgate	Aston Villa	£6.5 million	
9 August 2001	(England) Mark Wilson	Manchester United	£1.5 million	
9 August 2001	(England) Jonathan Greening	Manchester United	£2 million	
9 September 2001	(Scotland) Allan Johnston	(Scotland) Rangers	£600,000	
12 October 2001	(France) Franck Queudrue	(France) Lens	Loan	
7 February 2002	(Italy) Benito Carbone	Bradford City	Loan	
27 February 2002	(France) Mickael Debeve	(France) Lens	Loan	

=== Out ===
For departures of players out of contract at the end of 2000–01 see 2000-01 Middlesbrough F.C. season.

Date	Player	New Club	Fee	Ref
31 May 2001	(England) Neil Maddison	Darlington	Free	
19 July 2001	(France) Christian Karembeu	(Greece) Olympiacos	£2 million	
7 August 2001	(Republic of Ireland) Alan Moore	Burnley	Free	
8 August 2001	(Republic of Ireland) Keith O'Neill	Coventry	Free	
29 November 2001	(England) Brian Deane	Leicester	£150,000	
14 December 2001	(England) Steve Vickers	Birmingham	£400,000	
31 December 2001	(Republic of Ireland) Curtis Fleming	Crystal Palace	£150,000	
23 March 2002	(Scotland) Sean Kilgannon	(Scotland) Dunfermline	Free	
1 June 2002	(Colombia) Hamilton Ricard	Released	-	
23 March 2002	(England) Andy Campbell	Released	-	
1 June 2002	(England) Dean Gordon	Coventry	Free	

== Results ==
=== Premier League ===
Win Draw Loss

Note: Results are given with Middlesbrough score listed first.

Game	Date	Opponent	Venue	Result F–A	Attendance	Scorers
1	18 August 2001	Arsenal	H	0–4	31,557	
2	21 August 2001	Bolton Wanderers	A	0–1	20,747	
3	25 August 2001	Everton	A	0–2	32,829	
4	8 September 2001	Newcastle United	H	1–4	30,004	Cooper 4'
5	15 September 2001	West Ham United	H	2–1	25,455	Deane 31', Johnston 41'
6	17 September 2001	Leicester City	A	2–1	15,412	Ince 85', Greening 88'
7	23 September 2001	Chelsea	A	2–2	36,767	Stockdale 61', Bokšić 90'(pen)
8	29 September 2001	Southampton	H	1–3	26,142	Bokšić 75'(pen)
9	13 October 2001	Charlton Athletic	A	0–0	20,451	
10	22 October 2001	Sunderland	H	2–0	28,432	Queudrue 2', Bokšić 21'
11	27 October 2001	Tottenham Hotspur	A	1–2	36,062	Boksic 9'
12	3 November 2001	Derby County	H	5–1	28,117	Németh 49', Marinelli 57', 82', Bokšić 61, Mustoe 73'
13	17 November 2001	Aston Villa	A	0–0	35,424	
14	25 November 2001	Ipswich Town	H	0–0	32,586	
15	1 December 2001	Blackburn Rovers	A	1–0	23,849	Bokšić 45'
16	8 December 2001	Liverpool	A	0–2	43,674	
17	15 December 2001	Manchester United	H	0–1	34,358	
18	26 December 2001	Newcastle United	A	0–3	52,127	
19	29 December 2001	Arsenal	A	1–2	37,948	Whelan 22'
20	1 January 2002	Everton	H	1–0	27,463	Festa 50'
21	12 January 2002	Fulham	A	1–2	18,975	Cooper 8'
22	19 January 2002	Bolton Wanderers	H	1–1	26,104	Whelan 38'
23	29 January 2002	Sunderland	A	1–0	44,579	Whelan 14'
24	3 February 2002	Charlton Athletic	H	0–0	24,189	
25	9 February 2002	Leeds United	H	2–2	30,221	Ince 51', Windass 88'
26	19 February 2002	Fulham	H	2–1	26,235	Bokšić 27', Németh 77'
27	23 February 2002	West Ham United	A	0–1	35,420	
28	2 March 2002	Leicester City	H	1–0	25,734	Frank Sinclair (o.g.)
29	6 March 2002	Southampton	A	1–1	28,931	Whelan 57'
30	16 March 2002	Liverpool	H	1–2	31,253	Southgate 89'
31	23 March 2002	Manchester United	A	1–0	67,683	Bokšić 9'
32	30 March 2002	Tottenham Hotspur	H	1–1	31,258	Queudrue 69'
33	1 April 2002	Derby County	A	1–0	30,822	Mustoe 12'
34	14 April 2002	Aston Villa	H	2–1	26,003	Carbone 39', Ehiogu 65'
35	20 April 2002	Blackburn Rovers	H	1–3	26,932	Németh 90'
36	28 April 2002	Ipswich Town	A	0–1	25,979	
37	27 April 2002	Chelsea	H	0–2	28,686	
38	11 May 2002	Leeds United	A	0–1	40,218	

=== FA Cup ===
Round	Date	Opponent	Venue	Result	Attendance	Goalscorers
R3	8 January 2002	Wimbledon	A	0–0	6,885	
R3 replay	15 January 2002	Wimbledon	H	2–0	9,687	Whelan, Cunningham (og)
R4	26 January 2002	Manchester United	H	2–0	17,624	Whelan, Campbell
R5	16 February 2002	Blackburn Rovers	H	1–0	20,921	Ehiogu
Quarter-final	10 March 2002	Everton	H	3–0	26,950	Whelan, Nemeth, Ince
Semi-final	14 April 2002	Arsenal	N	0–1	-	

=== League Cup ===
Round	Date	Opponent	Venue	Result	Attendance	Goalscorers
R2	11 September 2001	Northampton Town	H	3–1	3,918	Murphy, Nemeth, Wilson
R3	10 October 2001	Blackburn Rovers	A	1–2 (a.e.t.)	9,536	Nemeth

== Statistics ==
=== Appearances and goals ===
No.	Pos	Nat	Player	Total		Premier League		FA Cup		League Cup	
No.	Pos	Nat	Player	Apps	Goals	Apps	Goals	Apps	Goals	Apps	Goals
Goalkeepers
1	GK	(Australia) AUS	Mark Schwarzer	25	0	21	0	3	0	1	0
15	GK	(England) ENG	Marlon Beresford	1	0	0+1	0	0	0	0	0
25	GK	(Wales) WAL	Mark Crossley	22	0	17+1	0	3	0	1	0
Defenders
3	DF	(England) ENG	Dean Gordon	1	0	0+1	0	0	0	0	0
5	DF	(Italy) ITA	Gianluca Festa	12	1	8	1	3+1	0	0	0
6	DF	(England) ENG	Gareth Southgate	44	1	37	1	6	0	1	0
17	DF	(England) ENG	Ugo Ehiogu	33	2	29	1	2	1	2	0
27	DF	(Scotland) SCO	Robbie Stockdale	36	1	26+2	1	6	0	2	0
28	DF	(England) ENG	Colin Cooper	21	2	14+4	2	1	0	1+1	0
33	DF	(England) ENG	David Murphy	8	1	0+5	0	0+1	0	2	1
37	DF	(France) FRA	Franck Queudrue	34	2	28	2	6	0	0	0
Midfielders
7	MF	(England) ENG	Robbie Mustoe	44	2	31+5	2	6	0	1+1	0
9	MF	(England) ENG	Paul Ince	36	3	31	2	4	1	1	0
10	MF	(Italy) ITA	Benito Carbone	13	1	13	1	0	0	0	0
12	MF	(England) ENG	Jonathan Greening	41	1	36	1	3+1	0	1	0
14	MF	(France) FRA	Mickaël Debève	6	0	1+3	0	1+1	0	0	0
21	MF	(England) ENG	Mark Wilson	14	1	2+8	0	1+1	0	2	1
23	MF	(Argentina) ARG	Carlos Marinelli	27	2	12+8	2	3+2	0	1+1	0
24	MF	(England) ENG	Phil Stamp	9	0	3+3	0	1+2	0	0	0
29	MF	(Republic of Ireland) IRL	Jason Gavin	13	0	5+4	0	1+1	0	1+1	0
31	MF	(Australia) AUS	Luke Wilkshire	8	0	6+1	0	1	0	0	0
32	MF	(Scotland) SCO	Allan Johnston	21	1	13+4	1	2+1	0	1	0
34	MF	(England) ENG	Stewart Downing	3	0	2+1	0	0	0	0	0
36	MF	(England) ENG	Mark Hudson	2	0	0+2	0	0	0	0	0
Forwards
8	FW	(Slovakia) SVK	Szilárd Németh	27	6	11+10	3	2+2	1	2	2
11	FW	(Croatia) CRO	Alen Bokšić	26	8	20+2	8	2+1	0	1	0
16	FW	(Cameroon) CMR	Joseph-Désiré Job	5	0	3+1	0	0	0	0+1	0
20	FW	(England) ENG	Dean Windass	34	1	8+19	1	3+3	0	1	0
26	FW	(England) ENG	Noel Whelan	27	7	18+4	4	5	3	0	0
Players transferred out during the season
2	DF	(Republic of Ireland) IRL	Curtis Fleming	8	0	8	0	0	0	0	0
4	DF	(England) ENG	Steve Vickers	2	0	2	0	0	0	0	0
10	FW	(England) ENG	Brian Deane	7	1	6+1	1	0	0	0	0
14	MF	(Australia) AUS	Paul Okon	4	0	1+3	0	0	0	0	0
18	FW	(England) ENG	Andy Campbell	5	1	0+4	0	0+1	1	0	0
19	FW	(Colombia) COL	Hamilton Ricard	11	0	6+3	0	1	0	0+1	0

Last updated: 30 May 2002

=== Goalscorers ===
Goalscoring statistics for 2001-02.

Name	League	FA Cup	League Cup	Total
(Croatia) Bokšić	8	0	0	8
(England) Whelan	4	3	0	7
(Slovakia) Németh	3	1	2	6
(England) Ince	2	1	0	3
(England) Cooper	2	0	0	2
(France) Queudrue	2	0	0	2
(Argentina) Marinelli	2	0	0	2
(England) Mustoe	2	0	0	2
(England) Deane	1	0	0	1
(Scotland) Johnston	1	0	0	1
(England) Greening	1	0	0	1
(England) Stockdale	1	0	0	1
(Italy) Festa	1	0	0	1
(England) Windass	1	0	0	1
(England) Southgate	1	0	0	1
(Italy) Carbone	1	0	0	1
(England) Ehiogu	1	0	0	1
(England) Murphy	0	0	1	1
(England) Wilson	0	0	1	1
(England) Campbell	0	1	0	1
Own Goals	1	1	0	2

=== Starting 11 ===
Considering starts in all competitions

- GK: #1, (Australia) Mark Schwarzer, 25
- RB: #27, (Scotland) Robbie Stockdale, 34
- CB: #6, (England) Gareth Southgate, 48
- CB: #17, (England) Ugo Ehiogu, 33
- LB: #37, (France) Franck Queudrue, 34
- RM: #23, (Argentina) Carlos Marinelli, 16
- CM: #9, (England) Paul Ince, 36
- CM: #7, (England) Robbie Mustoe, 38
- LM: #12, (England) Jonathan Greening, 40
- CF: #11, (Croatia) Alen Boksic, 23
- CF: #26, (England) Noel Whelan, 23
