= 1999–2000 Middlesbrough F.C. season =

Middlesbrough
1999–2000 season
- Chairman: Steve Gibson
- Manager: Bryan Robson
- Stadium: Riverside Stadium
- Premier League: 12th
- FA Cup: Third round
- League Cup: Quarter-finals
- Top goalscorer: League: Ricard (12); All: Ricard (14)
- Highest home attendance: 34,800 vs Leeds United (26 February, Premier League)
- Lowest home attendance: 8,843 vs Watford (13 October, League Cup)
- Average home league attendance: 33,263

During the 1999–2000 season, Middlesbrough participated in the FA Premier League.

== Season summary ==
Middlesbrough experienced another satisfactory season, finishing 12th in the Premiership. They never looked like qualifying for Europe, but were never in any danger of relegation. Nor did they make much of an impact in the cup competitions.

== Kit ==
Middlesbrough's kit was produced by Errea. The home shirt consisted of a red shirt with vertical navy and white stripes (repeated diagonally on the arms), white shorts with red stripes and red socks with navy and white trim. The away strip consisted of a white shirt with purple hoop framed with a black line, purple collar and shoulder bars, again with black trim, white shorts trimmed with purple and black and white purple topped socks.

Middlesbrough were again sponsored by BT Cellnet.

== Final league table ==
Pos	Team	Pld	W	D	L	GF	GA	GD	Pts
10	Tottenham Hotspur	38	15	8	15	57	49	+8	53
11	Newcastle United	38	14	10	14	63	54	+9	52
12	Middlesbrough	38	14	10	14	46	52	−6	52
13	Everton	38	12	14	12	59	49	+10	50
14	Coventry City	38	12	8	18	47	54	−7	44

Source: Premier League
Rules for classification: 1) points; 2) goal difference; 3) number of goals scored.

Results summary

Overall								Home						Away					
Pld	W	D	L	GF	GA	GD	Pts	W	D	L	GF	GA	GD	W	D	L	GF	GA	GD
38	14	10	14	46	52	−6	52	8	5	6	23	26	−3	6	5	8	23	26	−3

Source: 1999-2000 FA Premier League table

Results by round

Round	1	2	3	4	5	6	7	8	9	10	11	12	13	14	15	16	17	18	19	20	21	22	23	24	25	26	27	28	29	30	31	32	33	34	35	36	37	38
Ground	H	A	A	H	H	A	H	A	H	A	H	A	H	H	A	H	A	H	A	H	A	A	A	H	H	H	A	H	A	H	A	H	A	A	A	H	H	A
Result	L	W	W	W	L	L	W	L	L	L	W	W	W	D	L	D	D	W	L	L	D	L	L	L	W	D	D	W	D	W	W	L	L	D	W	D	D	W
Position	16	10	4	2	4	10	7	10	11	11	11	10	6	7	8	9	10	8	10	13	14	14	15	16	14	14	13	13	14	12	12	12	13	12	13	13	13	12

Source: 11v11.com: 1999-2000 Middlesbrough results
A = Away; H = Home; W = Win; D = Draw; L = Loss

== Results ==
Middlesbrough's score comes firstc

=== Legend ===
Win	Draw	Loss

=== FA Premier League ===
Date	Opponent	Venue	Result	Attendance	Scorers
7 August 1999	Bradford City	H	0–1	33,762	
10 August 1999	Wimbledon	A	3–2	11,036	Ziege, Ricard (2, 1 pen)
14 August 1999	Derby County	A	3–1	24,045	Deane, Ziege, Ricard (pen)
21 August 1999	Liverpool	H	1–0	34,783	Deane
24 August 1999	Leicester City	H	0–3	33,126	
28 August 1999	Aston Villa	A	0–1	28,728	
11 September 1999	Southampton	H	3–2	32,165	Pallister, Gascoigne (pen), Deane
19 September 1999	Leeds United	A	0–2	34,122	
25 September 1999	Chelsea	H	0–1	34,183	
3 October 1999	Newcastle United	A	1–2	36,421	Deane
17 October 1999	West Ham United	H	2–0	31,862	Deane, Armstrong
24 October 1999	Watford	A	3–1	16,081	Williams (own goal), Juninho, Ince
30 October 1999	Everton	H	2–1	33,916	Ziege, Deane
6 November 1999	Sunderland	H	1–1	34,793	Ricard
20 November 1999	Arsenal	A	1–5	38,082	Ricard
27 November 1999	Wimbledon	H	0–0	31,400	
4 December 1999	Bradford City	A	1–1	17,708	Ricard
18 December 1999	Tottenham Hotspur	H	2–1	33,129	Ziege, Deane
26 December 1999	Sheffield Wednesday	A	0–1	28,531	
15 January 2000	Derby County	H	1–4	32,745	Campbell
22 January 2000	Liverpool	A	0–0	44,324	
29 January 2000	Manchester United	A	0–1	61,267	
5 February 2000	Leicester City	A	1–2	17,550	Campbell
14 February 2000	Aston Villa	H	0–4	31,571	
19 February 2000	Coventry City	H	2–0	32,798	Festa, Ricard
26 February 2000	Leeds United	H	0–0	34,800	
4 March 2000	Southampton	A	1–1	15,223	Ricard (pen)
12 March 2000	Arsenal	H	2–1	34,244	Ince, Ricard
18 March 2000	Sunderland	A	1–1	42,013	Ziege
25 March 2000	Sheffield Wednesday	H	1–0	32,748	Campbell
3 April 2000	Tottenham Hotspur	A	3–2	31,796	Carr (own goal), Ricard (2)
10 April 2000	Manchester United	H	3–4	34,775	Campbell, Ince, Juninho
15 April 2000	Coventry City	A	1–2	19,435	Ziege (pen)
22 April 2000	Chelsea	A	1–1	34,467	Ricard
29 April 2000	West Ham United	A	1–0	25,472	Deane (pen)
2 May 2000	Newcastle United	H	2–2	34,744	Juninho, Festa
6 May 2000	Watford	H	1–1	32,930	Stockdale
14 May 2000	Everton	A	2–0	34,663	Deane, Juninho

=== FA Cup ===
Round	Date	Opponent	Venue	Result	Attendance	Goalscorers
R3	11 December 1999	Wrexham	A	1–2	11,755	Deane

=== League Cup ===
Round	Date	Opponent	Venue	Result	Attendance	Goalscorers
R2 1st Leg	14 September 1999	Chesterfield	A	0–0	4,941	
R2 2nd Leg	21 September 1999	Chesterfield	H	2–1 (won 2-1 on agg)	25,602	Ince, Vickers
R3	13 October 1999	Watford	H	1–0	8,843	Juninho
R4	30 November 1999	Arsenal	H	2–2 (won 3-1 on pens)	23,157	Ricard (2, 1 pen)
R5	14 December 1999	Tranmere Rovers	A	1–2	10,581	Ziege

== Squad ==
Note: Flags indicate national team as defined under FIFA eligibility rules; some limited exceptions apply. Players may hold more than one non-FIFA nationality.

No.	Pos.	Nation	Player
1	GK	AUS	Mark Schwarzer
2	DF	IRL	Curtis Fleming (Note: Fleming was born in Manchester, England, but was raised in the Republic of Ireland and made his international debut for the Republic of Ireland national football team in April 1996.)
3	DF	ENG	Dean Gordon
4	DF	ENG	Steve Vickers
5	DF	ITA	Gianluca Festa
6	DF	ENG	Gary Pallister
7	MF	ENG	Robbie Mustoe
8	MF	ENG	Paul Gascoigne
9	MF	ENG	Paul Ince
10	FW	ENG	Brian Deane
11	MF	IRL	Keith O'Neill
12	MF	IRL	Alan Moore
13	GK	ENG	Marlon Beresford
14	MF	ENG	Phil Stamp
15	MF	ENG	Neil Maddison
17	DF	GER	Christian Ziege
18	FW	ENG	Andy Campbell

No.	Pos.	Nation	Player
19	FW	COL	Hamilton Ricard
20	FW	ENG	Alun Armstrong
21	DF	ENG	Craig Harrison
22	MF	ENG	Mark Summerbell
23	MF	BRA	Juninho (on loan from Atlético Madrid)
24	DF	ENG	Steve Baker
25	GK	ENG	Ben Roberts
26	MF	ENG	Anthony Ormerod
27	DF	ENG	Robbie Stockdale
28	DF	ENG	Colin Cooper
29	DF	IRL	Jason Gavin
32	MF	ENG	Richard Kell
33	GK	SCO	Chris Bennion
34	MF	ARG	Carlos Marinelli
35	MF	SCO	Sean Kilgannon
36	MF	AUS	Luke Wilkshire

=== Left club during season ===
Note: Flags indicate national team as defined under FIFA eligibility rules; some limited exceptions apply. Players may hold more than one non-FIFA nationality.

No. / Pos. / Nation / Player; 16 / MF / IRL / Andy Townsend (to West Bromwich Albion)	No. / Pos. / Nation / Player; 30 / MF / IRL / Micky Cummins (to Port Vale)

=== Reserve squad ===
Note: Flags indicate national team as defined under FIFA eligibility rules; some limited exceptions apply. Players may hold more than one non-FIFA nationality.

No.	Pos.	Nation	Player
31	GK	AUS	Brad Jones
-	DF	ENG	Christian Hanson
-	DF	ENG	Stuart Parnaby
-	MF	ENG	Mark Hudson

No.	Pos.	Nation	Player
-	MF	IRL	Sean Prunty
-	FW	BRA	Arthuro
-	FW	ENG	Aaron Wilford

== Transfers ==
=== In ===
Date	Pos.	Name	From	Fee
30 July 1999	MF	Paul Ince	Liverpool	£1,000,000
31 July 1999	DF	Christian Ziege	A.C. Milan	£4,000,000
27 October 1999	MF	Carlos Marinelli	Boca Juniors	£1,500,000
23 March 2000	FW	Arthuro	Criciúma	Free transfer

=== Out ===
Date	Pos.	Name	To	Fee
17 September 1999	MF	Andy Townsend	West Bromwich Albion	£50,000
17 March 2000	MF	Micky Cummins	Port Vale	Free

Transfers in: ▼£6,500,000
Transfers out: ▲£50,000
Total spending: ▼£6,450,000

== Player statistics ==
=== Goalscorers ===
Goalscoring statistics for 1999–2000.

Name	League	FA Cup	League Cup	Total
(Colombia) Hamilton Ricard	12	0	2	14
(England) Brian Deane	9	1	0	10
(Germany) Christian Ziege	6	0	1	7
(Brazil) Juninho	4	0	1	5
(England) Andy Campbell	4	0	0	4
(England) Paul Ince	3	0	1	4
(Italy) Gianluca Festa	2	0	0	2
(England) Gary Pallister	1	0	0	1
(England) Paul Gascoigne	1	0	0	1
(England) Alun Armstrong	1	0	0	1
(England) Robbie Stockdale	1	0	0	1
(England) Steve Vickers	0	0	1	1
Own goals	2	0	0	2
