= 2000–01 Middlesbrough F.C. season =

Middlesbrough F.C.
2000–01 season
- Chairman: Steve Gibson
- Manager: Bryan Robson; Terry Venables (joint manager from 4 December)
- Stadium: Riverside Stadium
- FA Premier League: 14th
- FA Cup: Fourth round
- League Cup: Third round
- Top goalscorer: Alen Bokšić (12)
- Highest home attendance: 34,696 vs Liverpool (26 December 2000, FA Premier League)
- Lowest home attendance: 5,144 vs Macclesfield Town (19 September 2000, League Cup)
- Average home league attendance: 34,386
Home colours	Away colours

During the 2000–01 season, Middlesbrough participated in the FA Premier League.

== Season summary ==
Some early season relegation worries saw Middlesbrough chairman Steve Gibson respond by installing former England boss Terry Venables as joint manager alongside Bryan Robson in December. This experiment with joint management paid off as Middlesbrough finished 14th to avoid the drop by a comfortable margin.

Robson and Venables both departed after the season was over, and in came Manchester United assistant Steve McClaren to manage the Teesside club.

== Team kit and sponsors ==
Middlesbrough were again sponsored by BT Cellnet for the 2000–01 season.

The team's strip was produced by Errea. The home shirt consisted of a red shirt with white hoop, red shorts and red socks with white trim. The away strip consisted of a black shirt with red and white stripes in the middle, plain black shorts and black socks.

== Final league table ==
Pos	Team	Pld	W	D	L	GF	GA	GD	Pts
12	Tottenham Hotspur	38	13	10	15	47	54	−7	49
13	Leicester City	38	14	6	18	39	51	−12	48
14	Middlesbrough	38	9	15	14	44	44	0	42
15	West Ham United	38	10	12	16	45	50	−5	42
16	Everton	38	11	9	18	45	59	−14	42

Source: Premier League
Rules for classification: 1) points; 2) goal difference; 3) number of goals scored.

Results summary

Overall								Home						Away					
Pld	W	D	L	GF	GA	GD	Pts	W	D	L	GF	GA	GD	W	D	L	GF	GA	GD
38	9	15	14	44	44	0	42	4	7	8	18	23	−5	5	8	6	26	21	+5

Source: 2000-01 FA Premier League table

Results by round

Round	1	2	3	4	5	6	7	8	9	10	11	12	13	14	15	16	17	18	19	20	21	22	23	24	25	26	27	28	29	30	31	32	33	34	35	36	37	38
Ground	A	H	H	A	H	A	H	A	H	A	A	H	A	H	H	A	A	H	A	H	H	A	H	A	A	H	A	H	H	A	A	H	A	H	A	H	A	H
Result	W	D	L	D	L	D	D	W	L	L	L	L	L	L	D	L	L	W	D	W	D	D	W	D	D	D	D	L	D	W	L	D	W	L	W	L	D	W
Position	3	1	8	10	12	15	14	11	14	16	17	18	18	18	18	19	20	19	19	19	18	18	15	16	16	17	17	17	17	17	17	17	16	17	15	16	17	14

Source: 11v11.com: 2000-01 Middlesbrough results
A = Away; H = Home; W = Win; D = Draw; L = Loss

== Results ==
Middlesbrough's score comes first

=== Legend ===
Win	Draw	Loss

=== FA Premier League ===
Date	Opponent	Venue	Result	Attendance	Scorers
19 August 2000	Coventry City	A	3–1	20,624	Job, Bokšić (2)
22 August 2000	Tottenham Hotspur	H	1–1	31,254	Summerbell
26 August 2000	Leeds United	H	1–2	31,626	Stamp
6 September 2000	Derby County	A	3–3	24,290	Bokšić (pen), Job, Deane
9 September 2000	Everton	H	1–2	30,885	Watson (own goal)
17 September 2000	Manchester City	A	1–1	32,053	Festa
23 September 2000	Aston Villa	H	1–1	27,556	Alpay (own goal)
30 September 2000	Southampton	A	3–1	14,903	Bokšić (2), Festa
16 October 2000	Newcastle United	H	1–3	31,436	Deane
21 October 2000	Charlton Athletic	A	0–1	20,043	
28 October 2000	Ipswich Town	A	1–2	21,771	Gordon
4 November 2000	Arsenal	H	0–1	29,541	
11 November 2000	Manchester United	A	1–2	67,576	Karembeu
18 November 2000	Leicester City	H	0–3	27,965	
25 November 2000	Bradford City	H	2–2	28,526	Ehiogu, Ince
2 December 2000	West Ham United	A	0–1	25,459	
9 December 2000	Sunderland	A	0–1	47,742	
16 December 2000	Chelsea	H	1–0	29,422	Gordon
23 December 2000	Tottenham Hotspur	A	0–0	35,638	
26 December 2000	Liverpool	H	1–0	34,696	Karembeu
30 December 2000	Coventry City	H	1–1	30,499	Bokšić
1 January 2001	Leeds United	A	1–1	39,251	Bokšić
13 January 2001	Derby County	H	4–0	29,041	Bokšić (2, 1 pen), Ehiogu, Ricard (pen)
20 January 2001	Liverpool	A	0–0	43,042	
31 January 2001	Everton	A	2–2	34,244	Ricard, Cooper
3 February 2001	Manchester City	H	1–1	31,794	Cooper
10 February 2001	Aston Villa	A	1–1	28,912	Ehiogu
24 February 2001	Southampton	H	0–1	28,725	
3 March 2001	Charlton Athletic	H	0–0	28,177	
17 March 2001	Newcastle United	A	2–1	51,751	Bokšić (2)
31 March 2001	Chelsea	A	1–2	34,933	Windass
9 April 2001	Sunderland	H	0–0	31,284	
14 April 2001	Arsenal	A	3–0	37,879	Edu (own goal), Sylvinho (own goal), Ricard
16 April 2001	Ipswich Town	H	1–2	34,294	Windass
21 April 2001	Leicester City	A	3–0	18,162	Ricard, Bokšić, Ince
28 April 2001	Manchester United	H	0–2	34,417	
5 May 2001	Bradford City	A	1–1	20,921	Karembeu
19 May 2001	West Ham United	H	2–1	33,057	Job, Karembeu

=== FA Cup ===
Round	Date	Opponent	Venue	Result	Attendance	Goalscorers
R3	8 January 2001	Bradford City	A	1–0	7,303	Ricard
R4	6 February 2001	Wimbledon	H	0–0	20,625	
R4R	13 February 2001	Wimbledon	A	1–3 (a.e.t.)	5,991	Ricard

=== League Cup ===
Round	Date	Opponent	Venue	Result	Attendance	Goalscorers
R2 1st Leg	19 September 2000	Macclesfield Town	H	2–1	5,144	Whelan, Summerbell
R2 2nd Leg	26 September 2000	Macclesfield Town	A	3–1	3,153	Ricard (3)
R3	31 October 2000	Wimbledon	A	0–1	3,666	

== First-team squad ==
Squad at end of season

Note: Flags indicate national team as defined under FIFA eligibility rules; some limited exceptions apply. Players may hold more than one non-FIFA nationality.

No.	Pos.	Nation	Player
1	GK	AUS	Mark Schwarzer
2	DF	IRL	Curtis Fleming
3	DF	ENG	Dean Gordon
4	DF	ENG	Steve Vickers
5	DF	ITA	Gianluca Festa
6	DF	ENG	Gary Pallister
7	MF	ENG	Robbie Mustoe
8	MF	FRA	Christian Karembeu
9	MF	ENG	Paul Ince (captain)
10	FW	ENG	Brian Deane
11	FW	CRO	Alen Bokšić
12	MF	IRL	Keith O'Neill
13	GK	ENG	Marlon Beresford
14	MF	AUS	Paul Okon
15	MF	ENG	Neil Maddison
16	FW	CMR	Joseph-Désiré Job
17	DF	ENG	Ugo Ehiogu
18	FW	ENG	Andy Campbell

No.	Pos.	Nation	Player
19	FW	COL	Hamilton Ricard
20	FW	ENG	Dean Windass
22	MF	ENG	Mark Summerbell
23	MF	ARG	Carlos Marinelli
24	MF	ENG	Phil Stamp
25	GK	WAL	Mark Crossley
26	FW	ENG	Noel Whelan
27	DF	SCO	Robbie Stockdale
28	DF	ENG	Colin Cooper
29	DF	IRL	Jason Gavin
30	DF	ENG	Stuart Parnaby
31	MF	IRL	Alan Moore
32	DF	ENG	Steve Baker
33	MF	ENG	Anthony Ormerod
34	GK	SCO	Chris Bennion
35	MF	SCO	Sean Kilgannon
36	MF	ENG	Mark Hudson

=== Left the club during season ===
Note: Flags indicate national team as defined under FIFA eligibility rules; some limited exceptions apply. Players may hold more than one non-FIFA nationality.

No.	Pos.	Nation	Player
17	DF	GER	Christian Ziege (to Liverpool)
21	DF	ENG	Craig Harrison (to Crystal Palace)
20	FW	ENG	Alun Armstrong (to Ipswich Town)

No.	Pos.	Nation	Player
35	GK	ENG	Gary Walsh (on loan from Bradford City)
-	MF	ENG	Richard Kell (to Torquay United)

=== Reserve squad ===
Note: Flags indicate national team as defined under FIFA eligibility rules; some limited exceptions apply. Players may hold more than one non-FIFA nationality.

No.	Pos.	Nation	Player
-	GK	AUS	Brad Jones
-	GK	ENG	Sam Russell
-	DF	ENG	Phil Gulliver
-	DF	ENG	Christian Hanson
-	DF	IRL	Sean Prunty

No.	Pos.	Nation	Player
-	DF	AUS	Luke Wilkshire
-	MF	ENG	Stephen Brackstone
-	FW	BRA	Arthuro
-	FW	ENG	Aron Wilford

== Transfers ==
=== In ===
Date	Pos	Name	From	Fee	Notes
5 July 2000	MF	Christian Karembeu	Real Madrid	£2,100,000	
5 July 2000	MF	Paul Okon	Fiorentina	Free transfer	
18 July 2000	GK	Mark Crossley	Nottingham Forest	Free transfer	
31 July 2000	FW	Noel Whelan	Coventry City	£2,000,000	
31 July 2000	FW	Joseph-Désiré Job	RC Lens	£3,000,000	
7 August 2000	FW	Alen Bokšić	Lazio	£2,500,000	
20 October 2000	DF	Ugo Ehiogu	Aston Villa	£8,000,000	
8 March 2001	FW	Dean Windass	Bradford City	£600,000	

=== Out ===
Date	Pos	Name	To	Fee	Notes
13 July 2000	GK	Ben Roberts	Charlton Athletic	Free transfer	
17 July 2000	MF	Paul Gascoigne	Everton	Free transfer	
25 August 2000	DF	Christian Ziege	Liverpool	£5,500,000	
1 September 2000	DF	Craig Harrison	Crystal Palace	£200,000	
7 December 2000	FW	Alun Armstrong	Ipswich Town	£500,000	
9 March 2001	MF	Richard Kell	Torquay United	Free transfer	

Transfers in: ▼£18,200,000
Transfers out: ▲£6,200,000
Total spending: ▼£12,000,000

== Player statistics ==
=== Goalscorers ===
Goalscoring statistics for 2000-01.

Name	League	FA Cup	League Cup	Total
(Croatia) Bokšić	12	0	0	12
(Colombia) Ricard	4	2	3	9
(France) Karembeu	4	0	0	4
(Cameroon) Job	3	0	0	3
(England) Ehiogu	3	0	0	3
(England) Deane	2	0	0	2
(England) Gordon	2	0	0	2
(England) Ince	2	0	0	2
(England) Cooper	2	0	0	2
(England) Windass	2	0	0	2
(England) Summerbell	1	0	1	2
(Italy) Festa	2	0	0	2
(England) Stamp	1	0	0	1
(England) Whelan	0	0	1	1
Own Goals	4	0	0	4
