= 1997 Football League Cup final =

- Match programme cover
- Event: 1996–97 Football League Cup
Leicester City	Middlesbrough
- Leicester City won after a replay

Final
Leicester City	Middlesbrough
1	1
- After extra time
- Date: 6 April 1997
- Venue: Wembley Stadium, London
- Man of the Match: Steve Walsh (Leicester City)
- Referee: Martin Bodenham
- Attendance: 76,757

Replay
Leicester City	Middlesbrough
1	0
- After extra time
- Date: 16 April 1997
- Venue: Hillsborough Stadium, Sheffield
- Man of the Match: Steve Walsh (Leicester City)
- Referee: Martin Bodenham
- Attendance: 39,428

The 1997 Football League Cup final was played between Middlesbrough and Leicester City. The first game, at Wembley Stadium on Sunday 6 April 1997, ended in a 1–1 draw after extra time. Fabrizio Ravanelli opened the scoring only for Leicester's Emile Heskey to equalise in the last minute of extra time. Heskey was fortunate to be on the field, having committed what was a bookable foul on Boro captain Nigel Pearson after already being booked. Leicester won the replay, and their second League Cup, in the game played at Hillsborough Stadium on 16 April 1997 with another extra-time goal, this time from Steve Claridge.

This was the last year that the Football League Cup final was decided by a replay.

== Road to Wembley ==
=== Leicester City ===
Round 2, 1st leg: Scarborough 0–2 Leicester City

Round 2, 2nd leg: Leicester City 2–1 Scarborough

Round 3: York City 0–2 Leicester City

Round 4: Leicester City 2–0 Manchester United

Quarter-final: Ipswich Town 0–1 Leicester City

Semi-final, 1st leg: Leicester City 0–0 Wimbledon

Semi-final, 2nd leg: Wimbledon 1–1 Leicester City (on away goals)

=== Middlesbrough ===
Round 2, 1st leg: Middlesbrough 7–0 Hereford United

Round 2, 2nd leg: Hereford United 0–3 Middlesbrough

Round 3: Middlesbrough 5–1 Huddersfield Town

Round 4: Middlesbrough 3–1 Newcastle United

Quarter-final: Middlesbrough 2–1 Liverpool

Semi-final, 1st leg: Stockport County 0–2 Middlesbrough

Semi-final, 2nd leg: Middlesbrough 0–1 Stockport County

== Match details ==
6 April 1997
15:00 BST

Leicester City	1–1 (a.e.t.)	Middlesbrough
Heskey 118'	Report	Ravanelli 95'

Wembley Stadium, London
Attendance: 76,757
Referee: Martin Bodenham (Cornwall)

Leicester City	Middlesbrough

GK	13	(United States) Kasey Keller
DF	2	(England) Simon Grayson
DF	3	(England) Mike Whitlow		(substituted off) 105'
DF	5	(England) Steve Walsh (c)
DF	15	(Sweden) Pontus Kåmark	Yellow card
DF	17	(England) Spencer Prior	Yellow card
MF	6	(Turkey) Muzzy Izzet		(substituted off) 108'
MF	7	(Northern Ireland) Neil Lennon
MF	10	(England) Garry Parker
FW	9	(England) Steve Claridge
FW	11	(England) Emile Heskey	Yellow card
Substitutes:
GK	1	(England) Kevin Poole
MF	8	(England) Scott Taylor		(substituted on) 108'
FW	12	(England) Mark Robins		(substituted on) 105'
Manager:
(Northern Ireland) Martin O'Neill

GK	19	(Australia) Mark Schwarzer
DF	2	(England) Neil Cox	Yellow card
DF	14	(Republic of Ireland) Curtis Fleming
DF	5	(England) Nigel Pearson (c)
DF	18	(Italy) Gianluca Festa
MF	21	(England) Craig Hignett
MF	8	(England) Robbie Mustoe
MF	10	(Brazil) Juninho Paulista	Yellow card
MF	6	(Brazil) Emerson
FW	9	(Denmark) Mikkel Beck	Yellow card
FW	11	(Italy) Fabrizio Ravanelli
Substitutes:
DF	4	(England) Steve Vickers
DF	17	(Wales) Clayton Blackmore
MF	12	(Republic of Ireland) Alan Moore
Manager:
(England) Bryan Robson

Match rules

- 90 minutes
- 30 minutes of extra-time if necessary
- Replay if scores still level
- Three named substitutes
- Maximum of three substitutions

=== Replay ===
16 April 1997

Leicester City	1–0 (a.e.t.)	Middlesbrough
Claridge 100'	Report

Hillsborough Stadium, Sheffield
Attendance: 39,428
Referee: Martin Bodenham (Cornwall)

Leicester	Middlesbrough

GK	13	(United States) Kasey Keller
RWB	2	(England) Simon Grayson
CB	3	(England) Mike Whitlow		(substituted off) 109'
CB	5	(England) Steve Walsh (c)
CB	17	(England) Spencer Prior	Yellow card
LWB	15	(Sweden) Pontus Kåmark
CM	6	(Turkey) Muzzy Izzet	Yellow card
CM	7	(Northern Ireland) Neil Lennon	Yellow card
CM	10	(England) Garry Parker
CF	9	(England) Steve Claridge		(substituted off) 117'
CF	11	(England) Emile Heskey	Yellow card
Substitutes:
GK	1	(England) Kevin Poole
DF	21	(England) Jamie Lawrence		(substituted on) 109'
FW	12	(England) Mark Robins		(substituted on) 117'
Manager:
(Northern Ireland) Martin O'Neill

GK	25	(England) Ben Roberts
RB	2	(England) Neil Cox	Yellow card	(substituted off) 105'
CB	5	(England) Nigel Pearson (c)
CB	18	(Italy) Gianluca Festa		(substituted off) 76'
LB	7	(Slovakia) Vladimir Kinder	Yellow card
CM	17	(Wales) Clayton Blackmore
CM	6	(Brazil) Emerson
CM	8	(England) Robbie Mustoe
AM	10	(Brazil) Juninho Paulista	Yellow card
CF	21	(England) Craig Hignett		(substituted off) 105'
CF	11	(Italy) Fabrizio Ravanelli
Substitutes:
DF	4	(England) Steve Vickers		(substituted on) 76'
MF	12	(Republic of Ireland) Alan Moore		(substituted on) 105'
FW	9	(Denmark) Mikkel Beck		(substituted on) 105'
Manager:
(England) Bryan Robson

Match rules

- 90 minutes
- 30 minutes of extra-time if necessary
- Penalty shootout if scores still level
- Three named substitutes
- Maximum of three substitutions
