= 1997 FA Cup final =

English association football match

- Match programme
- Event: 1996–97 FA Cup
Chelsea	Middlesbrough
2	0
- Date: 17 May 1997
- Venue: Wembley Stadium, London
- Man of the Match: Roberto Di Matteo
- Referee: Stephen Lodge (South Yorkshire)
- Attendance: 79,160

The 1997 FA Cup final was the 116th final of the FA Cup. It took place on 17 May 1997 at Wembley Stadium and was contested by Chelsea and Middlesbrough, the North East club appearing in its first FA Cup Final.

Chelsea won 2–0 to win the FA Cup for the second time, the first having come in 1970. It was also the club's first major trophy in 26 years.

It was the first major honour in the career of most Chelsea's players, but for Mark Hughes, it was the fourth time that he had featured in an FA Cup winning side (having played on the winning Manchester United teams of 1985, 1990 and 1994). It was Middlesbrough's second defeat in a cup final in the 1996–97 season (they had also lost the League Cup final to Leicester City the previous month), and they were also relegated from the Premier League.

== Road to Wembley ==
=== Chelsea ===
Home teams listed first.

Round 3: Chelsea 3–0 W.B.A.

Round 4: Chelsea 4–2 Liverpool

Round 5: Leicester City 2–2 Chelsea

Replay: Chelsea 1–0 Leicester City

Quarter-Final: Portsmouth 1–4 Chelsea

Semi-Final: Wimbledon 0–3 Chelsea

(at Highbury, London)

=== Middlesbrough ===
Home teams listed first.

Round 3: Middlesbrough 6–0 Chester City

Round 4: Hednesford Town 2–3 Middlesbrough

Round 5: Manchester City 0–1 Middlesbrough

Quarter-Final: Derby County 0–2 Middlesbrough

Semi-Final: Chesterfield 3–3 Middlesbrough

(at Old Trafford, Manchester)

Replay: Middlesbrough 3–0 Chesterfield

(at Hillsborough Stadium, Sheffield)

== Match review ==
Chelsea took the lead just 43 seconds into the match, with Italian midfielder Roberto Di Matteo receiving the ball and firing it into the goal off the crossbar from 25 yards to record what was at the time the quickest ever goal in a Wembley FA Cup final (Louis Saha broke this record 12 years later in the 2009 final after just 25 seconds, coincidentally against Chelsea, though Chelsea won the match 2–1), breaking Jackie Milburn's 42-year record. Middlesbrough's prolific striker Fabrizio Ravanelli limped off after 21 minutes, further diminishing his side's chances of victory. Late in the first half Gianluca Festa put the ball in the net for Middlesbrough, but the goal was controversially ruled out for offside. In a largely disappointing match, in which Chelsea were generally in control, Chelsea eventually added a second goal seven minutes from full-time with Eddie Newton steering the ball into the net from Gianfranco Zola's clever flick to seal a 2–0 win.

== Match details ==
17 May 1997
15:00 BST

Chelsea	2–0	Middlesbrough
Di Matteo 1'; Newton 83'	Report

Wembley Stadium, London
Attendance: 79,160
Referee: Stephen Lodge (South Yorkshire)

Chelsea	Middlesbrough

GK	30	(Norway) Frode Grodås
CB	6	(Scotland) Steve Clarke
CB	5	(France) Frank Leboeuf	Booked
CB	20	(England) Frank Sinclair
RWB	2	(Romania) Dan Petrescu
LWB	17	(England) Scott Minto
CM	11	(England) Dennis Wise (c)
CM	16	(Italy) Roberto Di Matteo	Booked
CM	24	(England) Eddie Newton	Booked
CF	10	(Wales) Mark Hughes
CF	25	(Italy) Gianfranco Zola		(substituted off) 89'
Substitutes:
GK	13	(England) Kevin Hitchcock
DF	8	(England) Andy Myers
FW	9	(Italy) Gianluca Vialli		(substituted in) 89'
Manager:
(Netherlands) Ruud Gullit

GK	25	(England) Ben Roberts
RB	18	(Italy) Gianluca Festa	Booked
CB	5	(England) Nigel Pearson (c)
CB	14	(Republic of Ireland) Curtis Fleming
LB	17	(Wales) Clayton Blackmore
DM	6	(Brazil) Emerson
CM	8	(England) Robbie Mustoe		(substituted off) 29'
CM	20	(England) Phil Stamp
RF	21	(England) Craig Hignett		(substituted off) 74'
CF	11	(Italy) Fabrizio Ravanelli		(substituted off) 24'
LF	10	(Brazil) Juninho Paulista
Substitutes:
DF	4	(England) Steve Vickers		(substituted in) 29'
DF	7	(Slovakia) Vladimír Kinder		(substituted in) 74'
FW	9	(Denmark) Mikkel Beck		(substituted in) 24'
Manager:
(England) Bryan Robson

Match rules

- 90 minutes.
- 30 minutes of extra-time if necessary.
- Replay required if scores still level.
- Three named substitutes.
- Maximum of three substitutions.

== See also ==
- Blue Day (Chelsea song, with Suggs)
- Let's Dance (Middlesbrough song, with Bob Mortimer)
