= Stephen Lodge (referee) =

English football referee (born 1952)

- Full name: Stephen John Lodge
- Born: 26 September 1952 (age 74); Barnsley, Yorkshire, England

Domestic
Years	League	Role
1987–1992	Football League	Referee
1992–2001	Premier League	Referee

International
Years	League	Role
1992–1997	FIFA listed	Referee

Stephen John Lodge (born 26 September 1952) is an English former football referee, who retired from top-flight officiating at the end of the 2000-2001 season. He lives in Barnsley, Yorkshire, has a wife and one son, and works as a local government officer.

== Career ==
He took up the whistle at the age of 19 years, in the Barnsley & District Football League. He was included in the FA Premier League list of referees from its inception in 1992. His first appointment in this competition was the game between Middlesbrough and Manchester City on 19 August 1992 at Ayresome Park – a 2–0 home win with goals from Bernie Slaven.

Although never to be appointed to a FIFA World Cup competition or UEFA European Championships, he did take charge of Germany's pre-tournament friendly match against Canada in Toronto on 8 June 1994, prior to the World Cup of that year.

1996 was a busy year for Lodge. In that year he took charge of an FA Cup semi-final, a Football League Cup semi-final, and the FA Vase final of that year, in which Brigg Town beat Clitheroe 3–0.

He refereed the 1997 FA Cup Final when Chelsea defeated Middlesbrough 2–0, the goals coming from Roberto Di Matteo and Eddie Newton.

In 1998, he was appointed to referee another FA Cup semi-final, this time between Arsenal and Wolverhampton Wanderers, which the 'Gunners' won with a Christopher Wreh goal, on their way to winning a second "double". While refereeing an M69 derby between Coventry City and Leicester City in 1999 he attempted to backheel the ball during a break in play and fell over, an incident which was captured on camera and is regularly used in football blooper shows.

Since the year 2000, he has officiated in the annual series of national six-a-side tournaments called Masters Football, referees for which are FA endorsed. This competition features ex-professional footballers chosen by the PFA, and is televised on Sky TV.

On 7 May 2001, he stepped out for his last National List appointment, the game at Portman Road where Ipswich Town defeated Manchester City by 2 goals to 1. Matthew Holland and Martijn Reuser scored for Ipswich, Shaun Goater replied for City.

In 2002, he was invited by the then manager of Leeds United, David O'Leary, to counsel their players for a period of time regarding reaction to official decisions on the field of play and their incidents of past misconduct. He also became a UEFA Referees Observers Panel member in the same year, for a two-year period.

He is an FA Premier League referees' assessor.

Preceded by Dermot Gallagher	FA Cup Final Referee; 1997	Succeeded by Paul Durkin
