= Juninho Paulista =

Brazilian footballer (born 1973)

Personal information
- Full name: Osvaldo Giroldo Júnior
- Date of birth: 22 February 1973 (age 53)
- Place of birth: São Paulo, Brazil
- Height: 1.65 m (5 ft 5 in)
- Position: Attacking midfielder

Team information
- Current team: Brazil (staff)

Youth career
- 1989–1992: Ituano

Senior career*
Years	Team	Apps	(Gls)
1993–1995	São Paulo	44	(2)
1995–1997	Middlesbrough	57	(12)
1997–2002	Atlético Madrid	55	(14)
1999–2000	→ Middlesbrough (loan)	28	(4)
2000–2001	→ Vasco da Gama (loan)	47	(13)
2002	→ Flamengo (loan)	0	(0)
2002–2004	Middlesbrough	35	(11)
2004–2005	Celtic	14	(1)
2005–2006	Palmeiras	63	(20)
2007	Flamengo	0	(0)
2007–2008	Sydney FC	14	(0)
2010	Ituano	2	(2)
Total		359	(79)

International career
1995–2003	Brazil	49	(5)
Medal record
Men's football
Representing Brazil
FIFA World Cup
Winner	2002 Korea/Japan
FIFA Confederations Cup
Winner	1997 Saudi Arabia
Copa América
Runner-up	1995 Uruguay
Summer Olympics
Bronze medal – third place	1996 Atlanta
- * Club domestic league appearances and goals

Osvaldo Giroldo Júnior (born 22 February 1973), known as Juninho or Juninho Paulista, (Note: The nickname comes from a combination of the Brazilian diminutive "Juninho", which is commonly applied to any person with the name "Júnior", and "Paulista", meaning someone born in the state of São Paulo.) is a Brazilian former professional footballer who played as an attacking midfielder. During his professional career, Juninho played for Brazilian clubs São Paulo, Vasco da Gama, Palmeiras and Flamengo, as well as Middlesbrough in England, Atlético Madrid in Spain, Celtic in Scotland and Sydney FC in Australia. He is particularly associated with Middlesbrough, where he had three spells and became a popular figure among the club's supporters.

Juninho made 49 appearances for the Brazil national football team between 1995 and 2003. He was part of the squad that won the 2002 FIFA World Cup and also earned a bronze medal at the 1996 Olympic tournament.

== Club career ==
Born in São Paulo, Juninho played youth football for FC Curvados e Orgulhoso, a local club set up in São Paulo, and for Esporte Clube DER, an amateur team based in São Bernardo do Campo (SP), winning two youth municipal championship in a row, as well as futsal at Clube Atlético Juventus.

=== Ituano FC ===
Juninho began his senior career with Ituano, a team in Itu, São Paulo, in 1990. In 1993, during a Campeonato Paulista match against reigning champions São Paulo, Juninho scored and was voted man of the match, as Ituano secured an unlikely victory. This caught the attention of São Paulo's head coach Telê Santana, who requested that his team buy the young talent. Juninho went on to be voted "Rookie of the Year" that season.

=== São Paulo ===
In 1993, Juninho was transferred to São Paulo, with whom he won a number of trophies, including the 1993 Intercontinental Cup against Italian team Milan and the 1994 Copa CONMEBOL. He made his debut for the Brazil national team ("Seleção") in February 1995, before moving abroad to play in Europe.

=== Middlesbrough ===
In October 1995, Juninho signed for English club Middlesbrough for £4.75 million, just months after they had been promoted to the English top-flight FA Premier League. Then aged 22, Juninho had been tracked by numerous European top clubs, and it was a major surprise when he signed for "the Teessiders". Juninho became known as "TLF"—The Little Fella—by Boro fans, after local radio broadcaster Dave Roberts nicknamed the player on his football talk show. The nickname alludes to his height: only 1.65 m (5 ft 5 in). During his time with Middlesbrough, Juninho lived in Levendale and Ingleby Barwick with his parents.

He made his debut on 4 November 1995 at home to Leeds United, setting up the opening goal for Jan Åge Fjørtoft in a 1–1 draw. Having represented São Paulo and Middlesbrough during the year, he finished eighth in the voting for the 1995 FIFA World Player of the Year.

During the following season, Juninho established himself as one of Middlesbrough's key attacking players and helped the club reach both the FA Cup and League Cup finals, although they lost both. At the end of the season, a three-point deduction condemned Middlesbrough to relegation to the second tier. Following a 1–1 draw at Leeds United on the final day, which confirmed the club's relegation, Juninho was reduced to tears. Despite the club's relegation, Juninho came second to Gianfranco Zola for the FWA Player of the Year award, as well as winning the Premier League Player of the Season award, which as of 2025 remain the only time the award was won by a player whose club did not finish at least seventh. Ultimately, Juninho left Middlesbrough to pursue his chances of making Brazil's 1998 World Cup squad. Juninho scored 17 goals in 74 games during his first time at Middlesbrough.

=== Atlético Madrid ===
Juninho was sold to Atlético Madrid for £13m, and started out well for the team. However, his time at Atlético was hampered massively by injuries, and he never quite achieved the heights that were expected of him. On 1 February 1998, during a league match against Celta Vigo, a tackle by opponent defender Míchel Salgado broke Juninho's fibula, sidelining the Brazilian for six months and thus making him miss the 1998 World Cup.

Juninho was loaned back to Middlesbrough (who by then had been promoted back to the Premier League) during the 1999–2000 season, and scored four goals in 24 games for the club, before returning to Atlético Madrid. Upon his return, Atlético had been relegated to the secondary Segunda División. Juninho was then loaned out to Brazilian team Vasco da Gama, where he played alongside another Juninho, Juninho Pernambucano; he then earned the demonym "Paulista" in order to be differentiated from his teammate. He won the 2000 domestic Campeonato Brasileiro Série A championship and the international Copa Mercosur trophy. He also had a brief loan spell with Flamengo.

=== Return to Middlesbrough ===
Juninho began his third spell with Middlesbrough in the summer of 2002, when he permanently left Atlético Madrid for £6m. He spent two years back at the Riverside Stadium, and helped the club win the 2003–04 Football League Cup, the team's first major honour. In December 2007, he was voted by Boro fans in a PFA fan's poll as Middlesbrough's greatest ever player. Juninho is still seen as a hero on Teesside by many Middlesbrough fans – soon after he joined Middlesbrough in 1995, Boro fans would put out both their arms and bow forwards in worship during matches, this continued even through to his third spell at the club. Juninho said he would love a fourth spell at the Boro to end his career, however no such opportunity materialised.

Ultimately, although he did have a higher goals-to-games ratio during this period than in either of his previous two spells at the club, Juninho never fully recaptured his mesmerising form of the 1996–97 season and never fully recovered from the broken leg he suffered during his time at Atlético Madrid. Nonetheless, he remained a legend on Teesside and maintains an iconic status to this day. In 2021, a book detailing this special relationship between Juninho and the Boro fans was released, The Little Fella: How Middlesbrough Fell in Love With Juninho.

=== Celtic ===
At the end of the 2004 season, Juninho moved to Scottish club Celtic on a free transfer, making his debut in an Old Firm derby against Celtic's rivals Rangers, which Celtic won 1–0. Juninho struggled to break into the first team during his time with Celtic, and complained that manager Martin O'Neill did not play him enough. Instead of playing in his usual position in the middle of the pitch, Juninho was often deployed on the right by O'Neill, due to the presence of already established Celtic midfielders Stiliyan Petrov and Neil Lennon. Juninho scored only once in his spell at Celtic, in a 3–0 win over Hearts in October 2004.

=== Brazilian return ===
Juninho returned to Brazil in 2005, to play for Palmeiras. He moved back to his former team Flamengo in 2007 for the Carioca Championship and the Copa Libertadores, but never won the trust of coach Ney Franco, playing only about half of the games. In May that year, Juninho's contract was terminated after arguing with and insulting Franco after refusing to be substituted at half-time during a disappointing 3–0 quarter-final defeat at Uruguayan side Defensor Sporting in the Copa Libertadores.

=== Sydney FC ===
Although clubs in Brazil, Qatar, and Hong Kong were reportedly keen on signing Juninho, he opted to join Sydney FC in the A-League as the club's marquee player, signing on 1 August 2007, stating that the interest the club showed towards him made a strong contribution to the decision. Due to a shoulder injury early in the season, Juninho spent large periods on the bench and his on-field performances were hampered by chronic pain, aggressive play and secondary injuries, requiring painkillers and cortisone before each match. Despite this, he managed several strong showings including a masterful performance in Sydney's 5–3 victory over LA Galaxy.

Sydney's strong signings, which used a large amount of their salary cap, made a new contract look unlikely. A number of A-League clubs including Perth Glory, Gold Coast United and Adelaide United expressed their desire to sign Juninho. Following the signing of a new marquee player and other players, including Australian international John Aloisi, Sydney FC declined to offer Juninho a new contract. He was released in the off-season. In April 2008, Juninho later announced his retirement from professional football.

=== Return to playing ===
In January 2010, Juninho returned to the game as player-president of Brazilian club Ituano, and on the last day of the season, with his impending retirement, he scored the goal that saved them from relegation. He also returned to Middlesbrough where he featured in his own testimonial, in which Dutch team PSV Eindhoven defeated Middlesbrough 3–2. Eindhoven was the venue for Middlesbrough’s UEFA Cup Final.

== Style of play ==
A diminutive, skilful and creative playmaker, Juninho typically operated in the space behind the forwards, where he used his passing and ability to evade opponents to create attacking opportunities. Despite his small stature, he was also noted for his tenacity, robust style of play and uncompromising tackling.

== Career statistics ==
=== Club ===
Appearances and goals by club, season and competition
Club	Season	League			State league (Note: Includes Campeonato Paulista, Campeonato Carioca)		National cup (Note: Includes Copa do Brasil, FA Cup, Copa del Rey, Scottish Cup)		League cup (Note: Includes Football League Cup, Scottish League Cup)		Continental		Other		Total	
Club	Season	Division	Apps	Goals	Apps	Goals	Apps	Goals	Apps	Goals	Apps	Goals	Apps	Goals	Apps	Goals
São Paulo	1993	Série A	16	1											16	1
São Paulo	1994	Série A	19	2											19	2
São Paulo	1995	Série A	9	0											9	0
São Paulo	Total		44	3											44	3
Middlesbrough	1995–96	Premier League	21	2	–		–		–		–		–		21	2
Middlesbrough	1996–97	Premier League	35	12	–		6	2	7	1	–		–		48	15
Middlesbrough	Total		56	14	–		6	2	7	1	–		–		69	17
Atlético Madrid	1997–98	La Liga	23	6	–		2	1	–		6 (Note: Appearances in UEFA Cup)	2	–		31	9
Atlético Madrid	1998–99	La Liga	32	8	–		6	1	–		9	4	–		44	13
Atlético Madrid	Total		55	14	–		8	3	–		15	6	–		75	22
Middlesbrough (loan)	1999–2000	Premier League	28	4	–		1	0	6	1	–		–		35	5
Vasco da Gama (loan)	2000	Série A	23	4					–				18 (Note: Eight appearances and two goals in Copa João Havelange knockout stage, ten appearances and four goals in Copa Mercosur)	6	41	10
Vasco da Gama (loan)	2001	Série A	15	4	2	2			–		7 (Note: Appearance(s) in Copa Libertadores)	4	3 (Note: Appearances in Copa Mercosur)	2	27	12
Vasco da Gama (loan)	Total		38	8	2	2			–		7	4	21	8	68	22
Flamengo (loan)	2002	Série A	0	0					–		5	2			5	2
Middlesbrough	2002–03	Premier League	10	3	–		0	0	0	0	–		–		10	3
Middlesbrough	2003–04	Premier League	31	8	–		1	0	6	1	–		–		38	9
Middlesbrough	Total		41	11	–		1	0	6	1	–		–		48	12
Celtic	2004–05	Scottish Premier League	14	1	–		2	0	2	0	4 (Note: Appearances in UEFA Champions League)	0	–		22	1
Palmeiras	2005	Série A	37	14					–		2	0			39	14
Palmeiras	2006	Série A	26	6					–		1	0			27	6
Palmeiras	Total		63	20					–		3	0			66	20
Sydney	2007–08	A-League	14	0	–		–		–		–				14	0
Career total			354	73	2	2	17	5	21	3	34	12	21	8	449	103

=== International ===
Appearances and goals by national team and year

National team	Year	Apps	Goals
Brazil	1995	15	1
Brazil	1996	0	0
Brazil	1997	9	0
Brazil	1998	0	0
Brazil	1999	1	0
Brazil	2000	3	1
Brazil	2001	11	2
Brazil	2002	9	1
Brazil	2003	1	0
	Total	49	5

== Honours ==
São Paulo

- Supercopa Libertadores: 1993
- Intercontinental Cup: 1993
- Recopa Sudamericana: 1993, 1994
- Copa CONMEBOL: 1994

Vasco da Gama

- Campeonato Brasileiro Série A: 2000
- Copa Mercosur: 2000

Middlesbrough

- Football League Cup: 2003–04; runner-up: 1996–97
- FA Cup runner-up: 1996–97

Flamengo

- Campeonato Carioca: 2007

Brazil

- FIFA World Cup: 2002
- FIFA Confederations Cup: 1997

Individual

- Premier League Player of the Month: March 1997
- Premier League Player of the Season: 1996–97
- Middlesbrough Player of the Year: 1996–97
- North-East FWA Player of the Year: 1997
- Bola de Prata: 2000, 2005
- South American Team of the Year: 2000, 2001

== Sources ==
- Bellos, Alex (2014). Futebol: The Brazilian Way of Life - Updated Edition. Bloomsbury Publishing. ISBN 9781408854174 – via Google Books.
