= Robbie Stockdale =

Scotland international footballer

Personal information
- Full name: Robert Keith Stockdale
- Date of birth: 30 November 1979 (age 46)
- Place of birth: Redcar, England
- Position: Defender

Team information
- Current team: Newcastle United (U21 manager)

Youth career
- 1994–1997: Middlesbrough

Senior career*
Years	Team	Apps	(Gls)
1997–2004	Middlesbrough	75	(2)
2000	→ Sheffield Wednesday (loan)	6	(0)
2003–2004	→ West Ham United (loan)	7	(0)
2004	→ Rotherham United (loan)	16	(1)
2004–2005	Rotherham United	27	(0)
2005–2006	Hull City	14	(0)
2006	→ Darlington (loan)	3	(0)
2006–2008	Tranmere Rovers	80	(0)
2008–2012	Grimsby Town	29	(0)
Total		257	(3)

International career
2000	England U21	1	(0)
2002	Scotland	5	(0)

Managerial career
- 2011: Grimsby Town (joint caretaker)
- 2011–2012: Grimsby Town (youths)
- 2012–2018: Sunderland (youths)
- 2015: Sunderland (caretaker)
- 2017: Sunderland (caretaker)
- 2018: Sunderland (caretaker)
- 2021–2022: Rochdale
- 2026–: Newcastle United (under-21's)
- * Club domestic league appearances and goals as of 12:11, 11 July 2021(UTC)

Robert Keith Stockdale (born 30 November 1979) is a football manager and former professional footballer, he is under-21's manager of Newcastle United.

As a player, he was a defender from 1997 to 2012. He notably played Premier League football for Middlesbrough having also appeared as a professional for Sheffield Wednesday, West Ham United, Rotherham United, Hull City, Darlington and Tranmere Rovers before joining Grimsby Town in 2008. Stockdale won five international caps for Scotland, all in 2002.

Towards the end of his playing career, he became Grimsby's youth team manager and briefly served as caretaker manager. He held this position until 2012 where he took up a similar role with Sunderland. He subsequently moved up to coaching the first team and managed the club three times on a caretaker basis, before he left Sunderland in 2018. He has since worked as a coach for Hibernian and West Bromwich Albion. In 2021 he took over his first full time managerial position with Rochdale, he was dismissed on 18 August 2022. Stockdale joined Newcastle United as an assistant coach for the Under-21s in February 2025.

== Club career ==
=== Middlesbrough ===
Stockdale began his youth career at Middlesbrough and originally played as a forward. At the age of around 15 he converted to a right back and graduated to Middlesbrough's senior squad in 1997. He made over 70 Premier League appearances for Middlesbrough and scored 2 goals in games against Watford and Chelsea, as well as earning five international caps for Scotland. He had several loan spells during his time at Middlesbrough, to clubs such as Sheffield Wednesday and West Ham United.

=== Rotherham United ===
In 2004, Stockdale moved to Rotherham United after a successful loan spell in which he scored once against Burnley. He became an integral part of their defence, but the club and manager Ronnie Moore could not keep hold of Stockdale and several months later, midway through the 2004–05 season he left Rotherham to move to another part of Yorkshire.

=== Hull City ===
Stockdale signed for League One side Hull City and played out the season at the KC Stadium, but after the end of the league campaign he lost his place in the squad. After a troubled 2005–06 season when he failed to make a league appearance for Hull.

=== Tranmere Rovers ===
Stockdale was signed on a two-year contract by his former Rotherham boss Ronnie Moore for Tranmere Rovers in a £100,000 deal which also brought Kevin Ellison to the club. He made 35 league appearances during his debut season of 2006–07. Stockdale continued to be first choice at right back during the 2007–08 season, but was released by the club at the end of the campaign.

=== Grimsby Town ===
Stockdale signed a two-year deal with Grimsby Town under Alan Buckley in June 2008 and was the first new signing for The Mariners in for the 2008–09 campaign. He made his debut on 19 July in a pre-season friendly against Oldham Athletic at Blundell Park, and went on to score his first goal in a 2–1 defeat to Morecambe in the FA Cup. By this time Grimsby were under new stewardship following the sacking of Buckley in September 2008, with the club bringing in Mike Newell as his replacement. Following an injury spell in mid season, Stockdale remained on the sidelines for several months while his position was covered by Jamie Clarke. He managed a return to the first team in the closing months of the season and cemented his place at right back, eventually helping The Mariners stave off the threat of relegation from the Football League. During the 2009–10 season Stockdale suffered a hernia injury that kept him sidelined again for several months and would only see him compete 9 times during that season in which right sided attacking midfielder Peter Bore was deployed as the club's first choice right back which would eventually see him be awarded the "Fans Player of the Season". Grimsby suffered relegation from the Football League in May 2010 and a month later Stockdale signed a new contract to keep him at Blundell Park for a further season but in the contract was the introduction of Stockdale as the new youth team manager as well as continuing to make himself available for selection as a player. Grimsby manager Neil Woods handed Stockdale the number 39 shirt for the 2010–11 Conference National season as cover for Bore and Bradley Wood. On 18 January 2011 Stockdale played his first competitive match in 18 months when he was called upon to start in the 2–1 home win over Kettering Town, the game would be his final competitive match.

== International career ==
Although initially representing England at U21 level, Stockdale earned several call-ups to the Scotland team in 2002 whilst a Premier League regular for Middlesbrough. He was handed his Scotland debut by Berti Vogts in a 2–1 home defeat against Nigeria on 17 April 2002. In that same year he also played in defeats against Denmark, South Korea and South Africa as well as a 4–0 victory over Hong Kong.

== Coaching career ==
=== Grimsby Town ===
In June 2010 Stockdale signed a new deal with The Mariners, where he also became the club's youth team manager as well as staying on as a player. The club had not appointed a new youth team boss since promoting Neil Woods to first team manager following the sacking of Mike Newell in November 2009. Stockdale was kept on the playing records as well for the 2010–11 season and was handed a squad number to be used as cover for Peter Bore, Bradley Wood and Dwayne Samuels who were the club's other contracted players who are capable of playing in Stockdale's position.

Stockdale and assistant manager David Moore took caretaker control of the first team for the home tie with AFC Wimbledon on 5 March 2011, following the sacking of Neil Woods. The game ended in a 2–1 victory for The Mariners in what was Moore's first managerial match in fifteen years and Stockdale's first ever game as a manager. Stockdale and Moore relinquished managerial duties on 23 March to the newly-appointed duo of Paul Hurst and Rob Scott following two victories, one draw and one defeat. Stockdale continued to manage the youth team at the club until stepping down on 29 August 2012.

=== Sunderland ===
On 29 August 2012 Stockdale became a youth team coach of Premier League side Sunderland. In return Sunderland offered to take their first team squad for a pre-season friendly at Grimsby for the following summer. On 22 September 2013 Stockdale was appointed assistant to caretaker manager Kevin Ball, following the sacking of manager Paolo Di Canio. After Ball stopped working due to injury, Stockdale became the U21 team manager for the 2014–15 season. With four wins out of the final six games of that season, the team finished 4th in the Barclays U21 Premier League, just below Manchester United, Liverpool and Chelsea. Their unbeaten run, starting from March 2015, continued to the 2015–16 season and came to an end when they lost 0–1 to Reading in August. Stockdale then guided the team to another five wins and one draw against the likes of Manchester City, Southampton and Liverpool, which sent the team to top of the U21 Premier League table. Their victory over Liverpool marks a record of only 1 defeat in 22 games. With the impressive work he did with the U21 team, Stockdale was handed the role of acting head coach of the first team on 6 October 2015 after manager Dick Advocaat left.

Stockdale was promoted to the position of first team coach in October 2015, following the appointment of manager Sam Allardyce. He was put in caretaker charge of the team, jointly with Billy McKinlay, in November 2017. After one game in charge, a 1–0 loss against Middlesbrough on 5 November, McKinlay left Sunderland to take a coaching position at West Ham United. Stockdale then oversaw the team as sole caretaker manager for another game, a 2–2 home draw against Millwall on 17 November. Chris Coleman was then appointed manager and Stockdale remained as first team coach. Sunderland were relegated to League One at the end of the 2017–18 season, and Coleman was sacked a week before the last game of the season. Stockdale was given the caretaker role for a third time, and guided the team to a 3–0 home victory against Championship winners Wolves. He left Sunderland on 4 June 2018 after the arrivals of new owners and new manager Jack Ross.

=== Hibernian and West Bromwich Albion ===
Stockdale was appointed to an assistant coaching position at Scottish Premiership club Hibernian in February 2019, working with Paul Heckingbottom. Stockdale and Heckingbottom left Hibernian in November 2019, with the team sitting in 10th place in the league.

Sam Allardyce recruited Stockdale to be his first team coach at West Bromwich Albion in December 2020.

=== Rochdale manager ===
On 10 July 2021, Stockdale was appointed as first team manager of Rochdale. On 18 August 2022, Stockdale was dismissed as manager following defeat in their opening four games of the 2022–23 season, with the club rooted to the bottom of League Two.

=== Return to coaching ===
On 19 October 2022, Stockdale joined Hull City as a first team coach, to support interim manager Andy Dawson, on a temporary basis. He left this position three months later to join Milton Keynes Dons as their Assistant Head Coach. Stockdale was dismissed following relegation from EFL League One.

On 2 November 2023, Stockdale was appointed assistant manager to Stephen Clemence at Gillingham. Following Clemence's sacking at the end of the 2023–24 season, Stockdale departed the club.

On 3 June 2024, Stockdale was appointed assistant head coach of Barrow, once again supporting Clemence.

In February 2025, Stockdale was appointed as an assistant coach for Newcastle United's under 21 team. In January 2026, he took over on an interim basis.

== Career statistics ==
=== Player ===
Appearances and goals by club, season and competition
Club	Season	League			FA Cup		League Cup		Other		Total	
Club	Season	Division	Apps	Goals	Apps	Goals	Apps	Goals	Apps	Goals	Apps	Goals
Middlesbrough	1997–98	First Division	1	0	1	0	0	0	—		2	0
Middlesbrough	1998–99	FA Premier League	19	0	0	0	3	0	—		22	0
Middlesbrough	1999–2000	FA Premier League	11	1	0	0	3	0	—		14	1
Middlesbrough	2000–01	FA Premier League	0	0	0	0	0	0	—		0	0
Middlesbrough	2001–02	FA Premier League	28	1	6	0	2	0	—		36	1
Middlesbrough	2002–03	FA Premier League	14	0	0	0	1	0	—		15	0
Middlesbrough	2003–04	FA Premier League	2	0	—		0	0	—		2	0
Middlesbrough	Total		75	2	7	0	9	0	—		91	2
Sheffield Wednesday (loan)	2000–01	First Division	6	0	—		0	0	—		6	0
West Ham United (loan)	2003–04	First Division	7	0	1	0	1	0	—		9	0
Rotherham United (loan)	2003–04	First Division	16	1	—		—		—		16	1
Rotherham United	2004–05	Championship	27	0	0	0	2	0	—		29	0
Rotherham United	Total		43	1	0	0	2	0	—		45	1
Hull City	2004–05	League One	14	0	—		—		—		14	0
Hull City	2005–06	Championship	0	0	0	0	0	0	—		0	0
Hull City	Total		14	0	0	0	0	0	—		14	0
Darlington (loan)	2005–06	League Two	3	0	—		—		—		3	0
Tranmere Rovers	2006–07	League One	36	0	0	0	1	0	1 (Note: Appearances in Football League Trophy)	0	38	0
Tranmere Rovers	2007–08	League One	44	0	4	0	1	0	1	0	50	0
Tranmere Rovers	Total		80	0	4	0	2	0	2	0	88	0
Grimsby Town	2008–09	League Two	20	0	1	1	1	0	0	0	22	1
Grimsby Town	2009–10	League Two	8	0	0	0	1	0	0	0	9	0
Grimsby Town	2010–11	Conference Premier	1	0	0	0	—		0	0	1	0
Grimsby Town	Total		29	0	1	1	2	0	0	0	32	1
Career total			257	3	13	1	16	0	2	0	288	4

=== Manager ===
As of 16 August 2022

Managerial record by team and tenure
Team	Nat	From	To	Record								Ref
Team	Nat	From	To	G	W	D	L	GF	GA	GD	Win %	Ref
Grimsby Town (joint caretaker)	(England)	24 February 2011	23 March 2011	4	2	1	1	7	6	+1	50.00	
Sunderland (caretaker)	(England)	6 October 2015	9 October 2015	0	0	0	0	0	0	+0	—	
Sunderland (caretaker)	(England)	2 November 2017	19 November 2017	2	0	1	1	2	3	−1	0.00	
Sunderland (caretaker)	(England)	30 April 2018	25 May 2018	1	1	0	0	3	0	+3	100.00	
Rochdale	(England)	10 July 2021	18 August 2022	59	16	18	25	65	76	−11	27.12	
Total				66	19	20	27	77	85	−8	28.79	

== See also ==
- List of Scotland international footballers born outside Scotland
- List of sportspeople who competed for more than one nation
