= Micky Cummins =

Irish footballer (born 1978)

Personal information
- Full name: Michael Thomas Cummins
- Date of birth: 1 June 1978 (age 48)
- Place of birth: Dublin, Ireland
- Height: 6 ft 0 in (1.83 m)
- Positions: Midfielder; right-back

Youth career
- 1996–1998: Middlesbrough

Senior career*
Years	Team	Apps	(Gls)
1998–2000	Middlesbrough	2	(0)
2000–2006	Port Vale	253	(31)
2006–2008	Darlington	79	(10)
2008–2010	Rotherham United	50	(5)
2010–2011	Grimsby Town	36	(1)
2011–2014	Gateshead	98	(13)
Total		518	(60)

International career
1997	Republic of Ireland U20	5	(2)
	Republic of Ireland U21	2	(0)

Managerial career
- 2015: Gateshead (caretaker)
- 2017: Gateshead (caretaker)
- * Club domestic league appearances and goals

Michael Thomas Cummins (born 1 June 1978) is an Irish former professional footballer.

As a player, he was a midfielder from 1996 to 2014. He started his career with Middlesbrough in 1996, where he stayed for four years. In 2000, he moved on to Port Vale and made over 250 appearances for the club in a six-year stay, picking up a Football League Trophy winners medal in 2001. Between 2006 and 2008, he was signed to Darlington, and in 2008 he joined Rotherham United. Two years later, he transferred to Grimsby Town before he joined Gateshead in May 2011. He scored 67 goals in 588 league and cup appearances throughout his career. He has also appeared for the Republic of Ireland under-21 team and played all of Ireland's five games at the 1997 FIFA World Youth Championship.

After retiring as a player, he turned to coaching and twice took charge as caretaker manager at Gateshead. He coached at the club before taking up a coaching role at York City from 2019 to 2021.

== Club career ==
=== Middlesbrough ===
Cummins began his professional career as a trainee with Middlesbrough in 1996. He made his Premier League debut under Bryan Robson on 16 May 1999, playing the full ninety minutes of a 4–0 defeat to West Ham United at Upton Park. He made his second appearance off the bench on 26 February 2000, in a goalless draw at the Riverside Stadium. He later said "I was just a squad player. I was never treated as a person or an individual".

=== Port Vale ===
Cummins joined Brian Horton's Port Vale on a free transfer in March 2000. He scored his first senior goal on 21 March in a 2–1 defeat to Walsall at Vale Park. He played twelve First Division games in 1999–2000, as the "Valiants" were relegated into the Second Division. He was given a two-year contract in the summer. He played a total of 56 games in 2000–01 in league and cup, mainly out of position at right-wing-back, including the 2001 Football League Trophy final 2–1 victory over Brentford at the Millennium Stadium. He scored three goals throughout the campaign, including the opener of the 2–1 victory over Stoke City in the Football League Trophy Northern Section semi-finals. He was utilized mostly at right-back throughout the campaign, before reverting to his more established midfield position.

Cummins was a key player for Vale in 2001–02, scoring nine goals in 53 games; the most significant of these nine goals came in a 1–0 win against Potteries derby opponents Stoke City at the Britannia Stadium on 10 February (the last such meeting between the two clubs). In 2002–03 he scored four goals in 35 games, with two of these goals coming in a 4–2 win over Mansfield Town on 30 November; his appearances were limited by a shoulder injury that required surgery. He recovered from a knee injury to score four goals in 46 games in 2003–04, as new manager Martin Foyle led the club to a seventh-place finish – the club finished outside of the play-off zone due to an inferior goal difference. Having signed a two-year deal in May 2004, Cummins scored twice in 43 games in 2004–05, as Vale struggled to compete in the third tier. With ten League One goals in 2005–06, he finished the campaign as the club's joint-highest league goalscorer (with Leon Constantine); he also overcame injury problems to play a total of 42 games. Having made a total of 287 league and cup appearances for Port Vale, scoring 34 goals, he decided to relocate to the North East for family reasons.

=== Darlington ===
Cummins joined David Hodgson's Darlington on a free transfer in May 2006. He quickly became a regular in the first-team for the "Quakers", making 45 league and cup appearances in the 2006–07 season despite suffering from a groin problem. Darlington knocked Championship side Stoke City out of the League Cup in August 2006, and finished the season in mid-table. He was nominated for the League Two Player of the Month award in November 2006. However, following Darlington's failure to gain promotion out of League Two in the 2007–08 season, Cummins was released by manager Dave Penney.

=== Rotherham United ===
He signed a two-year contract with League Two rivals Rotherham United, then managed by Mark Robins, in May 2008. He scored five goals in 45 games in 2008–09. He scored against Championship club West Bromwich Albion in the 4–3 defeat in the League Cup second round on 26 August 2009. A groin injury meant that he was restricted to just 17 appearances in 2009–10. He did not feature in the play-off final defeat to Dagenham & Redbridge.

=== Grimsby Town ===
Released by Rotherham, Cummins signed a one-year deal with Neil Woods' Grimsby Town in June 2010. He played a total of 40 games for the Conference Premier side in 2010–11, scoring one goal in a 2–0 win over Luton Town at Blundell Park. Though Woods was keen to sign him to a longer contract, Cummins left the club at the end of the campaign after he was released by new management duo Rob Scott and Paul Hurst.

=== Gateshead ===
In May 2011, he joined Conference side Gateshead on a one-year deal. He was signed by manager Ian Bogie, his former teammate at Port Vale. Cummins made his Gateshead debut on 13 August, scoring their second goal against Kidderminster Harriers in a 3–2 win at Aggborough. He enjoyed his most prolific season yet in 2011–12, bagging 12 goals in 49 appearances, and starting in all league games. He agreed a new one-year contract with the club in May 2012 to cover the 2012–13 season. He went on to play 42 games in the 2012–13 campaign, helping the "Tynesiders" to a 17th-place finish. On 18 August 2013, Cummins was named caretaker assistant manager at Gateshead following the resignation of Anth Smith, a position he held until 3 September when Gary Mills was appointed manager. He was limited to five starts in the 2013–14 campaign as Gateshead secured a play-off spot with a third-place finish.

== International career ==
Cummins was a squad member in the 1994 UEFA European Under-16 Championship, and won caps for the Republic of Ireland under-21 side. He also scored two goals at the 1997 FIFA World Youth Championship in Malaysia; he found the net in a 2–1 win over the United States and a 1–1 draw with China at the group stage held at the Darul Aman Stadium in Alor Setar. The Irish were knocked out by eventual winners Argentina at the semi-final stage, and then finished third following a 2–1 win over Ghana.

== Coaching career ==
In July 2014, Cummins was appointed joint reserve and youth team coach at Gateshead, alongside Paul Bryson. On 23 November 2015, Cummins was named co-caretaker manager of Gateshead alongside Ben Clark following the departure of manager Malcolm Crosby. The pair spent just four days in charge before Neil Aspin was named as the club's new manager. He again stepped up to the role as caretaker manager when Aspin departed on 4 October 2017, holding the post until Steve Watson was appointed manager on 10 October. Watson went on to name Cummins as his assistant. Watson again appointed Cummins as his assistant when he took the management role at National League North side York City in January 2019. On 28 October 2021, he was suspended by the club after he was charged by the Football Association concerning 148 bets placed on football matches between January 2015 and March 2019. Steve Watson was sacked two weeks later, leading to Cummings's permanent departure from the York Community Stadium.

== Style of play ==
Cummins has been described as being "comfortable on the ball" and possessing "good aerial ability". Rotherham teammate Tom Pope said that he was "one of the best I have seen" for his jumping ability and timing in the air. In May 2011, Gateshead manager Ian Bogie stated that Cummins was "a talented player with a physical presence who can also score goals, has a lot of know how... a player who will put his foot in and dictate play." In May 2006, Darlington manager David Hodgson stated that "Michael is one of the most consistent players in League One."

== Career statistics ==
=== Playing statistics ===
Appearances and goals by club, season and competition
Club	Season	League			FA Cup		League Cup		Other^{[A]}		Total	
Club	Season	Division	Apps	Goals	Apps	Goals	Apps	Goals	Apps	Goals	Apps	Goals
Middlesbrough	1996–97	Premier League	0	0	0	0	0	0	—		0	0
Middlesbrough	1997–98	First Division	0	0	0	0	0	0	—		0	0
Middlesbrough	1998–99	Premier League	1	0	0	0	0	0	—		1	0
Middlesbrough	1999–2000	Premier League	1	0	0	0	0	0	—		1	0
Middlesbrough	Total		2	0	0	0	0	0	0	0	2	0
Port Vale	1999–2000	First Division	12	1	—		—		—		12	1
Port Vale	2000–01	Second Division	45	2	2	0	2	0	7	1	56	3
Port Vale	2001–02	Second Division	46	8	2	1	2	0	3	0	53	9
Port Vale	2002–03	Second Division	30	4	1	0	1	0	3	0	35	4
Port Vale	2003–04	Second Division	42	4	2	0	1	0	1	0	46	4
Port Vale	2004–05	League One	39	2	2	0	0	0	2	0	43	2
Port Vale	2005–06	League One	39	10	2	0	1	1	0	0	42	11
Port Vale	Total		253	31	11	1	7	1	16	1	287	34
Darlington	2006–07	League Two	39	4	2	0	2	0	2	0	45	4
Darlington	2007–08	League Two	40	6	2	0	1	0	3	0	46	6
Darlington	Total		79	10	4	0	3	0	5	0	91	10
Rotherham United	2008–09	League Two	35	4	2	1	3	0	5	0	45	5
Rotherham United	2009–10	League Two	15	1	0	0	1	1	1	0	17	2
Rotherham United	Total		50	5	2	1	4	1	6	0	62	7
Grimsby Town	2010–11	Conference Premier	36	1	2	0	—		2	0	40	1
Gateshead	2011–12	Conference Premier	44	10	1	1	—		4	1	49	12
Gateshead	2012–13	Conference Premier	39	3	1	0	—		2	0	42	3
Gateshead	2013–14	Conference Premier	15	0	0	0	—		0	0	15	0
Gateshead	Total		98	13	2	1	0	0	6	1	106	15
Career totals			518	60	21	3	14	2	35	2	588	67

A. The "Other" column constitutes appearances and goals (including those as a substitute) in the Football League Trophy and FA Trophy.

=== Managerial statistics ===
As of match played 30 September 2017

Managerial record by team and tenure
Team	From	To	Record					Ref
Team	From	To	P	W	D	L	Win %	Ref
Gateshead (caretaker)	23 November 2015	27 November 2015	0	0	0	0	—	
Gateshead (caretaker)	4 October 2017	10 October 2017	1	0	0	1	0.0	
Total			1	0	0	1	0.0	

== Honours ==
Port Vale

- Football League Trophy: 2000–01

Republic of Ireland

- FIFA World Youth Championship Third Place: 1997
