= Chris Morris (footballer) =

Footballer (born 1963)

Personal information
- Full name: Christopher Barry Morris
- Date of birth: 24 December 1963 (age 62)
- Place of birth: Newquay, Cornwall
- Height: 5 ft 8 in (1.73 m)
- Position: Defender

Senior career*
Years	Team	Apps	(Gls)
1982–1987	Sheffield Wednesday	74	(1)
1987–1992	Celtic	158	(8)
1992–1997	Middlesbrough	82	(3)
Total		314	(12)

International career
1987–1993	Republic of Ireland	35	(0)
1990	Scottish League XI	1	(0)
- * Club domestic league appearances and goals

Christopher Barry Morris (born 24 December 1963) is a former professional footballer, who played as a defender for Celtic, Sheffield Wednesday and Middlesbrough, among others. Born in Cornwall, he played for the Republic of Ireland national team at international level.

== Club career ==
Morris first began his career in 1982, signing for Sheffield Wednesday under ex-England international, Jack Charlton, in the old Division Two. He won promotion to the First Division with Sheffield in 1984. Morris made seventy-four appearances between 1983 and 1987, scoring one goal along the way. Morris then moved north of the border to Celtic, signing for £125,000 on 10 August 1987. He made his debut in the 4–0 win over Morton, at age 23. Between 1987 and 1992, Morris was Celtic's regular right-back, with 160 appearances and 8 goals.

Morris was the only Celtic player to play in all 55 games of the 1987–88 season, in which Celtic won both the Scottish Premier Division and Scottish Cup. He was on the team for a second Celtic Scottish Cup win in 1989. Morris then moved on to Middlesbrough on 14 August 1992, where he remained for several seasons as a first team regular without ever becoming a crowd favourite. Troubled by an anterior cruciate ligament injury, he retired at the end of the 1996-97 season, when Boro were runners-up in the FA Cup and Football League Cup, but a 3-point deduction for postponing a match at short notice had caused them to be relegated from the Premier League.

== International career ==
In 1988, Morris caught the attention of Jack Charlton, who by then was the Republic of Ireland manager. Morris, although born in England, also qualified for Irish citizenship through his Monaghan-born mother. He was called up to play for Ireland and made a promising debut in the 5-0 friendly win against Israel at Dalymount Park on 10 November 1987. Morris was part of the Irish squad for Euro 88, which was the firsr time the Republic of Ireland had ever qualified for a major tournament. Morris played in all three games of the championships, including a 1–0 win over England. Although the Republic were eliminated following a late goal by Wim Kieft in their final group game against Holland, Morris became a household name in Ireland, along with the rest of the team, who were greeted as heroes on their return home.

Morris was also in the squad that qualified for World Cup 1990 in Italy, another major first for the Republic. He played in every game. This time it was a goal from Italy's Salvatore Schillaci that knocked Ireland out of the quarter finals, but it was another high-point for the team, and for Morris.

Ireland failed to qualify for the next European Championships in 1992, and Morris played his final international game against Wales on 17 November 1992.

== Personal life ==
Morris has a daughter, Rebecca, and a son, Christopher, from his first marriage.

After leaving football, Morris went back to Cornwall to work for the family business "Morris Cornish Pasties," which his parents had run since 1971.

He also coaches Bodmin College football team, who were crowned East Cornwall champions in Morris's first season with them.

== Honours ==
Celtic

- Scottish Football League: 1987–88
- Scottish Cup: 1987–88 1988–89

Middlesbrough

- Football League First Division: 1994–95

== See also ==
- List of Republic of Ireland international footballers born outside the Republic of Ireland
