= Craig Liddle =

English footballer

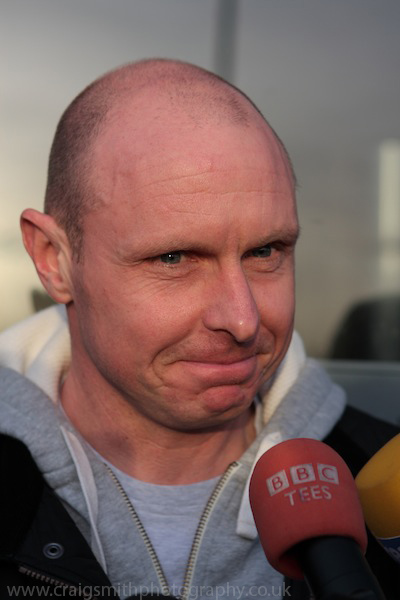

Personal information
- Full name: Craig George Liddle
- Date of birth: 21 October 1971 (age 55)
- Place of birth: Chester-le-Street, England
- Height: 5 ft 11 in (1.80 m)
- Position: Defender

Team information
- Current team: Middlesbrough (academy manager)

Senior career*
Years	Team	Apps	(Gls)
1990–1991	Aston Villa	0	(0)
1991–1994	Blyth Spartans		
1994–1998	Middlesbrough	30	(0)
1998	→ Darlington (loan)	16	(0)
1998–2005	Darlington	321	(19)
2012	Darlington	0	(0)

Managerial career
- 2009: Darlington (caretaker)
- 2009: Darlington (caretaker)
- 2010: Darlington (caretaker)
- 2011–2012: Darlington (caretaker)
- 2017: Middlesbrough (caretaker)
- * Club domestic league appearances and goals

Craig George Liddle (born 21 October 1971 in Chester-le-Street, County Durham) is an English former professional footballer, who played in central defence. During his playing career, made more than 300 appearances in the Football League, playing four years for Middlesbrough, as well as a seven-year spell at Darlington.

He became manager of Middlesbrough's Academy in January 2017, and in December of that year was appointed first-team caretaker manager after Garry Monk's dismissal.

== Career ==
Liddle began his professional career at Aston Villa in 1990, where he had been a trainee, when he signed his first professional contract. However, the player was released after just one season for failing to impress. Liddle then made the decision to join local team Blyth Spartans, where he spent the next three seasons.

In 1994, he signed for First Division club, Middlesbrough, under the management of Bryan Robson. He joined Darlington on loan in February 1998. In 16 games he made a good impression, playing not only in defence, but also as a midfielder.

On 1 July 1998, Liddle signed for the club on a permanent basis, thus leaving Middlesbrough after four years. During his time with Darlington, Liddle showed his professional skills as a footballer and was a popular club captain. Rated by fans as one of the best defenders in the Third Division, he attracted interest from other clubs. He was voted Darlington's all-time cult hero by BBC Football Focus viewers with 70% of the vote. His last seasons at the club were marked by injury, as his career took its toll.

His 300th appearance for Darlington on 1 May 2004 was marked by a commemorative beer brewed by the Darwen Brewery – Liddle's Best, as well as specially printed T-shirts going on sale. On the announcement on his retirement in May 2005 Liddle was granted a testimonial against his former club Middlesbrough in July 2005. Due to a hoax bomb threat the game had to be abandoned at half time.

== Coaching career ==
=== Darlington ===
Liddle worked as a football coach at Darlington College from September 2005 until June 2007. In February 2008, Liddle returned to Darlington as a youth team coach under first team manager Neil Maddison, after Mick Tait left the club. On 8 May 2009, Liddle and Madison became joint caretaker managers, after Brackenbury Clark and Company, the administrators of the club, had released the majority of the first-team squad and the club coaching and administrative staff from their contracts with immediate effect in order to save money.

With the appointment of Colin Todd as the new manager on 20 May, Liddle remained at the club as the head of youth coach. Todd departed on 26 September and Liddle took over as caretaker manager the following day, assisted by Maddison once again, until a replacement for Todd had been found. Liddle ruled himself out of taking the permanent management role, saying he did not have the experience needed to run a club.

On 5 October, it was announced that the former Republic of Ireland national team manager, Steve Staunton, had been appointed as the new permanent manager of the club. In addition to Staunton, the club brought in former Sunderland coach, Kevin Richardson, as his assistant. The pair did not start their roles until later that week, while Liddle finished his role as caretaker manager after the Football League Trophy tie against Leeds United on 6 October. On 21 March 2010, he joined Maddison as caretaker once again, following the dismissal of Staunton, before Simon Davey was appointed manager on 1 April.

Liddle then started a fourth spell as club caretaker manager on 25 October 2011, following the dismissal of previous manager, Mark Cooper, the previous day. The club suffered financial difficulties during his time at the club, and his contract was terminated on 16 January 2012, along with his playing squad. After a last minute offer of funding to the club's administrators, the team's players were reinstated; Liddle re-registered as a player, taking his previous number 4 shirt. However, he did not make an appearance, with the club relegated and then liquidated at the end of season.

=== Middlesbrough ===
Liddle was an under-18 coach at the Academy of Middlesbrough, before being appointed Academy manager in January 2017. Following the departure of Garry Monk, on 23 December 2017, Liddle was appointed caretaker manager, dealing with the first-team affairs until a permanent replacement was found. Tony Pulis was appointed permanent first-team manager on 26 December 2017, however Liddle acted as caretaker manager for that day, due to Pulis not having trained the club, and led the team to a 2–0 victory over Bolton Wanderers at the Riverside Stadium.

== Personal life ==
Liddle's son Ben, was also a professional footballer who came through the academy at Middlesbrough.

== Managerial statistics ==
Club	From	To	Record					Ref.
Club	From	To	P	W	D	L	Win %	Ref.
Darlington (caretaker)	26 October 2011	16 January 2012	13	4	4	5	30.76	
Middlesbrough (caretaker)	23 December 2017	26 December 2017	1	1	0	0	100.00	

== Honours ==
Individual

- PFA Team of the Year: 1999–2000 Third Division
