= Clayton Blackmore =

Welsh footballer and manager

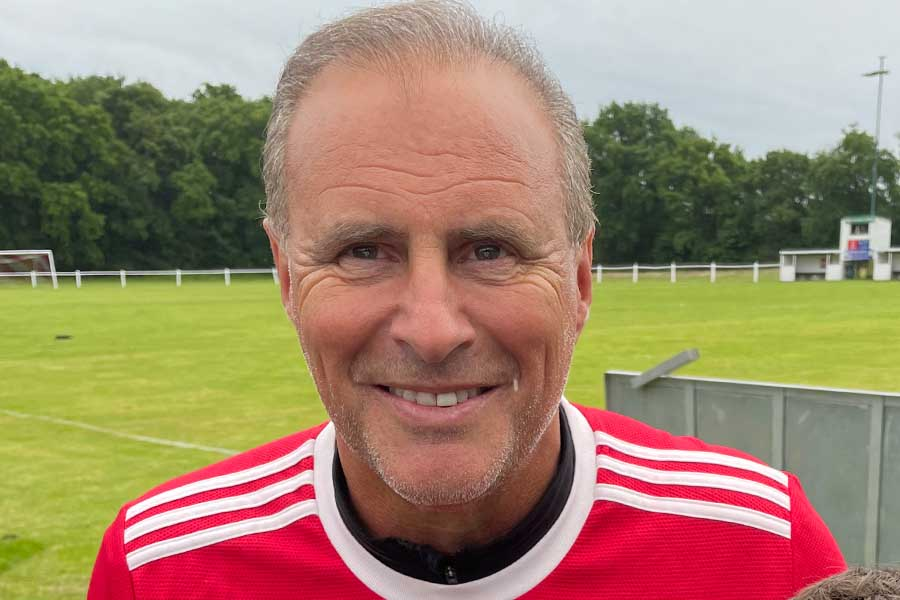
- Blackmore in June 2022

Personal information
- Full name: Clayton Graham Blackmore
- Date of birth: 23 September 1964 (age 62)
- Place of birth: Neath, Wales
- Height: 5 ft 9 in (1.75 m)
- Positions: Full-back; midfielder

Youth career
- 1978–1982: Manchester United

Senior career*
Years	Team	Apps	(Gls)
1982–1994	Manchester United	186	(19)
1994–1999	Middlesbrough	53	(4)
1996	→ Bristol City (loan)	5	(1)
1999	Barnsley	7	(0)
1999–2000	Notts County	21	(2)
2000	Leigh RMI	1	(0)
2000–2006	Bangor City	176	(11)
2006–2007	Porthmadog	18	(4)
2007–2010	Neath Athletic	22	(0)
Total		489	(41)

International career
1983	Wales U21	3	(0)
1985–1997	Wales	39	(1)

Managerial career
- 2006: Bangor City
- 2007: Porthmadog
- * Club domestic league appearances and goals

Clayton Graham Blackmore (born 23 September 1964) is a Welsh former international footballer. He was a combative player known for his attacking free kicks and a utility player who excelled in defence, but could play equally well in midfield.

Blackmore began his professional career at Manchester United in 1982, having progressed through the club's youth ranks. After twelve years and 186 league appearances, he switched to Middlesbrough on a free transfer, and made 53 league appearances in five years, whilst also having a brief loan spell at Bristol City in 1996. Having left Middlesbrough in 1999, he had short spells at Barnsley, Notts County and Leigh RMI over the next couple of seasons, before a much longer stint at Bangor City commenced in 2000. He left Bangor City in 2006 (after a brief stint as player-manager), having made 176 league appearances for the club, and, after spending a season with Porthmadog (where he was also player-manager), switched to Neath Athletic in 2007, where he made a further 22 league appearances before retiring in 2010. Internationally, Blackmore won 39 caps for Wales between 1985 and 1997.

== Club career ==
=== Manchester United ===
He joined Manchester United as an associated schoolboy at the age of 14, and was an FA Youth Cup finalist in 1982.

He was given his debut for United on 16 May 1984 by manager Ron Atkinson, in their 2–0 league defeat against Nottingham Forest at the City Ground. He made a solitary league appearance the following season, although in 1985–86 he scored three goals in 12 league games, but he did not get a serious run in the side until the 1987–88 season, by which time Alex Ferguson was United's manager, when he played 22 league games and scored three goals. 1988–89 saw Blackmore enjoy even more first team opportunities as he played 28 times in the league.

He made 35 league appearances for United in 1990–91, and 33 in 1991–92.

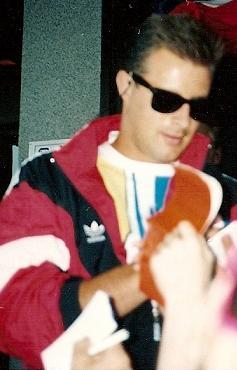
Blackmore in 1991.

He was part of the 1990 FA Cup winning side and the following year, he won a European Cup Winners' Cup medal with United. He was United's regular left-back in the 1990–91 season, but when Paul Parker signed in the close season, Denis Irwin was switched to left-back and Blackmore returned to his familiar pattern of alternating between different positions, although he did enjoy a good run at right-back when Parker was injured.

Blackmore collected an FA Premier League title medal in 1992–93, although he was no longer a regular player at the club, often coming on as a substitute or standing in as a full-back or on the flanks on the few occasions he did start a game. A succession of injuries meant that he was unable to play in the 1993–94 season, and competition throughout the team was growing.

In the days of 1–11 numbering of shirts (with players not being assigned the same shirt number for every game of the season), Blackmore's versatility meant that he wore every shirt number from 2 to 11, as well as some of the shirt numbers from 12 to 16 as a substitute. He was assigned with the number 15 when squad numbers were introduced by the FA Premier League for the 1993–94 season, but did not play any first team games that season.

=== Middlesbrough ===
He joined Middlesbrough on a free transfer for the 1994–95 season after spending more than a decade at Old Trafford. He was signed by newly appointed player-manager Bryan Robson, who had just headed to Teesside from United. He helped them win promotion to the Premier League as Division One champions in his first season on Teesside, playing in 30 League games and scoring two goals. He also appeared in Middlesbrough's 1997 FA Cup Final defeat by Chelsea. Whilst at Boro he had a loan spell with Bristol City.

=== Later career ===
He later had brief spells with Barnsley and at Notts County. Later he moved into non-league football with Leigh RMI and Bangor City.

On 3 September 2018, Blackmore joined the coaching staff of the Dynamo Brest Academy He left the club in summer 2019.

== International career ==
He won 39 caps for Wales. He made his senior debut for the national side on 26 February 1985, in a 1–1 friendly draw with Norway, and his final appearance for the Welsh side came on 29 March 1997.

== Honours ==
Manchester United

- Premier League: 1992–93
- FA Cup: 1989–90
- FA Charity Shield: 1990 (shared)
- European Cup Winners' Cup: 1990–91
- European Super Cup: 1991
- Football League Cup runner-up: 1990–91

Middlesbrough

- Football League First Division: 1994–95
- FA Cup runner-up: 1996–97
- Football League Cup runner-up: 1996–97

Leigh RMI

- Peter Swales Shield: 1999–2000

Individual

- Welsh Premier League Team of the Year: 2004–05
