= Hámilton Ricard =

Colombian footballer (born 1974)

Personal information
- Full name: Hámilton Ricard Cuesta
- Date of birth: 12 January 1974 (age 52)
- Place of birth: Quibdó, Chocó, Colombia
- Height: 1.84 m (6 ft 1/2 in)
- Position: Forward

Senior career*
Years	Team	Apps	(Gls)
1992–1997	Deportivo Cali	61	(92)
1997–2001	Middlesbrough	115	(33)
2001–2002	CSKA Sofia	9	(1)
2002	Independiente Santa Fe	0	(0)
2003	Shonan Bellmare	9	(1)
2003	Cortuluá	3	(0)
2004	Emelec	25	(17)
2004	APOEL	15	(6)
2005	Deportivo Cali	6	(0)
2005	Numancia	16	(2)
2006–2007	Danubio	25	(11)
2007–2008	Shanghai Shenhua	42	(14)
2009–2010	Danubio	10	(3)
2010–2011	Concepción	16	(5)
2011–2012	Deportes Quindío	30	(10)
2012–2013	Cortuluá	11	(0)

International career
1995–2000	Colombia	27	(5)
- * Club domestic league appearances and goals

Hámilton Ricard Cuesta (Spanish pronunciation: [ˈxamilton ˈrikaɾð ˈkwesta]; born 12 January 1974) is a Colombian former footballer who played as a striker. He played for clubs in 10 countries, including Colombian sides Deportivo Cali, Cortuluá, Independiente Santa Fe and Deportes Quindío, English club Middlesbrough, CSKA Sofia in Bulgaria, Emelec in Ecuador, Japanese side Shonan Bellmare, APOEL in Cyprus, Spanish side Numancia, Uruguayan club Danubio and Concepción in Chile.

== Career ==
Ricard was signed for Middlesbrough by manager Bryan Robson for a fee of £2 million in 1998. He signed his signature on a napkin because Middlesbrough had no documents. Over a four-year Middlesbrough career, he scored 33 goals in 115 appearances. He was twice Middlesbrough's top scorer. When Steve McClaren took over the reins, Ricard was deemed surplus to requirements and allowed to move to CSKA Sofia on a free transfer. After one season in Bulgaria, Ricard moved to Japan, where he joined Second Division side Shonan Bellmare.

Since leaving Middlesbrough, Ricard courted controversy both on and off the pitch. In 2002, he was involved in a car accident that killed a passenger, and was banned from football for 12 months for attacking a referee and making obscene gestures to the crowd while playing for Guayaquil side Emelec. The ban was reduced on appeal, and since then, Ricard attempted to move back to Europe to rejuvenate his career. He briefly played in Cyprus for APOEL, before signing a year's deal with Numancia for the 2005–06 season. He played 16 times, scoring two goals.

After he moved to Danubio in Uruguay where he scored 12 goals and was voted as one of their best players of the decade. In June 2007 he trialled with Chinese Super League team Shanghai Shenhua, subsequently signing a contract with the Chinese club.

Ricard has represented Colombia 27 times, scoring five goals.

== Club statistics ==
Club performance			League	
Season	Club	League	Apps	Goals
Colombia			League	
1993	Deportivo Cali	Primera A	15	5
1994	Deportivo Cali	Primera A	46	17
1995	Deportivo Cali	Primera A		
1996	Deportivo Cali	Primera A		36
1997	Deportivo Cali	Primera A		
England			League	
1997–98	Middlesbrough	First Division	9	2
1998–99	Middlesbrough	Premier League	36	15
1999–2000	Middlesbrough	Premier League	34	12
2000–01	Middlesbrough	Premier League	27	4
2001–02	Middlesbrough	Premier League	9	0
Bulgaria			League	
2001–02	CSKA Sofia	A PFG	9	1
Colombia			League	
2002	Independiente Santa Fé	Primera A	0	0
Japan			League	
2003	Shonan Bellmare	J2 League	12	2
Colombia			League	
2003	Cortuluá	Primera A	3	0
Ecuador			League	
2004	Emelec	Serie A	25	17
Cyprus			League	
2004–05	APOEL	First Division	15	6
Colombia			League	
2005	Deportivo Cali	Primera A	6	0
Spain			League	
2005–06	Numancia	Segunda División	16	2
Uruguay			League	
2006–07	Danubio	Primera División	25	11
China PR			League	
2007	Shanghai Shenhua	Super League	15	5
2008	Shanghai Shenhua	Super League	27	9
Uruguay			League	
2009–10	Danubio	Primera División	10	3
Country	Colombia		70	58
Country	England		115	33
Country	Bulgaria		9	1
Country	Japan		12	2
Country	Ecuador		25	17
Country	Cyprus		15	6
Country	Spain		16	2
Country	Uruguay		35	14
Country	China PR		27	9
Total			324	106

== Personal life ==
Ricard has a daughter.

== International goals ==
#	Date	Stadium	Rival	Goal	Result	Competition
1	8-6-1997	Estadio Centenario, Montevideo	Uruguay	1-1	1-1	1998 FIFA World Cup qualification
2	13-6-1997	Estadio Ramón Tahuichi Aguilera, Santa Cruz	Mexico	1-2	1-2	Copa América 1997
3	5-7-1997	Nacional de Chile, Chile	Chile	1-3	1-4	1998 FIFA World Cup qualification
4	7-7-1999	Estadio Feliciano Cáceres	Ecuador	2-0	2-1	Copa América 1999

== Honours ==
Middlesbrough

- Football League Cup runner-up: 1997–98

Shanghai Shenhua

- A3 Champions Cup: 2007
