= Gianluca Festa =

Italian former football player

Personal information
- Date of birth: 15 March 1969 (age 57)
- Place of birth: Cagliari, Italy
- Height: 1.82 m (6 ft 0 in)
- Positions: Centre-back; right-back

Youth career
- –1986: Cagliari

Senior career*
Years	Team	Apps	(Gls)
1986–1993	Cagliari	128	(0)
1987–1988	→ Fersulcis (loan)	26	(2)
1993–1994	Inter Milan	4	(0)
1994	Roma	21	(1)
1994–1997	Inter Milan	62	(3)
1997–2002	Middlesbrough	136	(10)
2002–2003	Portsmouth	27	(1)
2003–2004	Cagliari	26	(2)
2004–2007	Nuorese	79	(6)
2007–2008	Tavolara	15	(0)
2008–2009	Sanluri	31	(1)
Total		555	(26)

Managerial career
- 2010: Cagliari (assistant)
- 2010–2012: Cagliari Primavera
- 2012–2013: Lumezzane
- 2015: Cagliari
- 2015–2016: Como
- 2018–2019: AEL
- 2021: AEL
- 2021–2022: Apollon Smyrnis
- 2022: Lamia
- 2025–2026: Birkirkara
- 2026: AEL
- * Club domestic league appearances and goals

Gianluca Festa (born 15 March 1969) is an Italian professional football manager and former player. Festa played as a defender for clubs such as Inter Milan and Roma, and is best known playing for Middlesbrough and Cagliari.

== Playing career ==
=== Cagliari, Inter and Roma ===
Born in Cagliari, Festa started his career at his hometown club Cagliari. During the 1987–88 season, he was loaned to Fersulcis. After his loan spell, he started impressing and showing constant performances at Cagliari which eventually made Inter Milan show interest, whom he joined in 1993. In his first year at the club, he only made four league starts for Inter, and was transferred to Serie A rivals Roma. His form for Roma then earned him a move back to Inter Milan, where he became a regular starter for the club; however, prior to joining Middlesbrough, he lost his place in the team and found himself mainly as a substitute.

=== Middlesbrough ===
In 1997, Festa joined Middlesbrough, being one of the first Italians to play in the Premier League. Festa arrived at Middlesbrough from Inter in the midst of a relegation battle to add steel to the defence. Festa was the second Italian at the club with Middlesbrough, who also had Italian international Fabrizio Ravanelli at the club. Festa scored on an impressive winning debut against Sheffield Wednesday in January 1997. Festa had been an accomplished martial arts master, a junior Italian tennis champion and captain of the Army team when he did his national service. He had shrewd positional sense, was tough in the tackle, a dominating figure in the air and got forward on occasions to score the odd important goal. After scoring in the semi-final against Chesterfield, a goal that could have been even more historic was ruled out when Festa's header in the 1997 FA Cup Final was deemed offside. That was one of three Wembley appearances he made in his first 18 months at the club.

When many of Middlesbrough's players left following relegation, Festa stayed and helped win promotion back to the top flight. His performances earned him the Middlesbrough player of the year award in 1998. Festa was squeezed out by the arrivals of England internationals Gareth Southgate and Ugo Ehiogu but remained as a squad player. In his final season at Boro, they again reached the FA Cup semi finals. This time, they faced Arsenal. Festa came on as a substitute for the injured Ehiogu with the score poised at 0–0. However, he scored an own goal, which proved to be decisive, as Arsenal reached the final with a narrow 1–0 win. Other memorable moments for Festa include scoring a late equaliser in a 3–3 draw with Southampton, despite the team being reduced to nine men, and an equaliser against North East rivals Newcastle United.

=== Portsmouth ===
In 2002, Festa left Middlesbrough for a short spell at Portsmouth, where he scored once against Bradford City and was part of the squad that won the First Division and gained promotion to the Premier League. He left Portsmouth at the end of the season.

=== Return to Cagliari and lower league football ===
In 2003, he returned to Italy, joining Cagliari and helping the rossoblu win promotion to the Serie A. In 2004, he joined Eccellenza Sardinia side Nuorese, serving as team captain and leading the club to two consecutive promotions. At the end of the 2006–07 season, and an unsuccessful appearance in the Serie C2 playoffs, he left the team by mutual consent in September 2007. Festa then signed for Tavolara in the Serie D, coached by his former teammate Vittorio Pusceddu. He ended his career after playing for Sanluri in the Eccellenza Sardinia in the 2008–09 season.

== Style of play ==
Usually deployed as a central defender in the role of a stopper, Festa was known for his tenacious and hard-tackling playing style, as well as his positional sense, man-marking ability, physical power, strength in the air, ability to organize the back-line, and his capacity to get forward despite being a defender; indeed, he was well-known for his eye for scoring goals, having scored at least once in every season of his career since the 1993–94 season. He was also capable of playing as a right-back, and often played in this position during his time with Cagliari.

== Coaching career ==
=== Cagliari ===
On 14 April 2010, he was appointed as assistant manager to newly appointed manager Giorgio Melis at his former club Cagliari. He has also been in charge of the club's Primavera team.

=== Lumezzane ===
On 14 June 2012, he was appointed the new manager of Lumezzane in the Lega Pro Prima Divisione. In March 2013, Festa left Lumezzane and was replaced by Lumezzane captain Michele Marcolini.

=== Leeds United: Massimo Cellino takeover ===
On 31 January 2014, Festa was tipped to replace Brian McDermott as the new manager of Leeds United, a decision which caused uproar amongst the club's fans. On 1 February, it was rumoured that Festa was to sit in the dugout for Leeds United's game against Ipswich Town. McDermott was reinstated as manager on 1 February, during the second half of the Huddersfield Town match; on 3 February, McDermott revealed in his press conference that Festa had changed the starting lineup on 31 January for the fixture against Huddersfield Town, only for the team to then be changed back again to the original starting lineup on 1 February by McDermott's assistant manager Nigel Gibbs, who also took charge as caretaker instead of Festa. McDermott also revealed that on 3 February that Festa was still present in training, however this time acting as a translator for new signing Andrea Tabanelli. Tabanelli was signed in between the window of McDermott's "sacking" and his reinstatement.

=== Return to Cagliari ===
On 22 April 2015, following Zdeněk Zeman's resignation, Festa was appointed as the new manager of relegation-threatened Serie A side Cagliari, returning to the club he both played for and served as assistant manager. Despite winning a number of matches, Festa was unable to prevent Cagliari from being relegated to the Serie B. At the end of the season, Festa left the club and was replaced by Massimo Rastelli.

=== Como ===
On 1 November 2015, he was named new manager of Como in the Serie B. He was sacked on 13 March 2016, with the club being at the bottom of the table.

=== AEL ===
On 24 September 2018, he was named new manager of AEL in the Super League Greece. During his time in Larissa, he managed to keep the team in the Super League and thus avoided relegation. At the end of the season, he resigned.

On 21 January 2021, he returned to AEL for a second spell. He was sacked on 9 May 2021, following a 3–1 away defeat against Volos.

=== Apollon Smyrnis ===
On 24 September 2021, he was announced as the new manager of Apollon Smyrnis in the Super League Greece.

== Managerial statistics ==
As of 13 November 2022

Team	From	To	Record				
Team	From	To	M	W	D	L	Win %
(Italy) Cagliari Primavera	1 July 2010	13 June 2012	52	17	12	23	32.69
(Italy) Lumezzane	14 June 2012	19 March 2013	28	9	11	8	32.14
(Italy) Cagliari	21 April 2015	12 June 2015	7	4	1	2	57.14
(Italy) Como	1 November 2015	13 March 2016	20	2	10	8	10.00
(Greece) AEL	24 September 2018	30 June 2019	31	10	10	11	32.26
(Greece) AEL	21 January 2021	9 May 2021	17	4	4	9	23.53
(Greece) Apollon Smyrnis	24 September 2021	26 February 2022	16	2	5	9	12.50
(Greece) Lamia	3 March 2022	13 November 2022	26	5	9	12	19.23
Total			197	53	62	82	26.90

== Honours ==
Cagliari

- Serie C1 (Girone B): 1988–89
- Coppa Italia Serie C: 1988–89

Inter Milan

- UEFA Cup: 1993–94

Middlesbrough

- FA Cup runner-up: 1996–97
- Football League Cup runner-up: 1996–97, 1997–98

Portsmouth

- Football League First Division: 2002–03
