= Phil Stamp =

English footballer

Personal information
- Full name: Philip Lawrence Stamp
- Date of birth: 12 December 1975 (age 50)
- Place of birth: Middlesbrough, England
- Height: 5 ft 10 in (1.78 m)
- Position: Midfielder

Youth career
- 1991–1993: Middlesbrough

Senior career*
Years	Team	Apps	(Gls)
1993–2002	Middlesbrough	116	(6)
2001	→ Millwall (loan)	1	(0)
2002–2005	Hearts	65	(6)
2005–2007	Darlington	8	(1)
- * Club domestic league appearances and goals

Philip Lawrence Stamp (born 12 December 1975) is an English former footballer, best known for his time with Middlesbrough and Heart of Midlothian.

== Career ==
Stamp made his first-team league debut for Middlesbrough on 10 October 1993, at the age of 17, in a 2–0 defeat to Watford. He started for Middlesbrough in the 1997 FA Cup final defeat to Chelsea.

After Middlesbrough, he played for Heart of Midlothian. As a popular player with Hearts, he had many highlights, including a derby winner against Hibs.

After Hearts, he played for Darlington, scoring a free-kick against Shrewsbury Town. He also played in goal for the second half of a game against Notts County.

== Honours ==
Middlesbrough

- FA Cup runner-up: 1996–97
