= Steve Vickers (footballer) =

English footballer

Personal information
- Full name: Stephen Vickers
- Date of birth: 13 October 1967 (age 59)
- Place of birth: Bishop Auckland, England
- Height: 6 ft 1 in (1.85 m)
- Position: Defender

Senior career*
Years	Team	Apps	(Gls)
1984–1985	Spennymoor United		
1985–1993	Tranmere Rovers	311	(11)
1993–2001	Middlesbrough	258	(8)
2001	→ Crystal Palace (loan)	6	(0)
2001	→ Birmingham City (loan)	5	(0)
2001–2003	Birmingham City	14	(1)
- * Club domestic league appearances and goals

Stephen Vickers (born 13 October 1967) is an English former association footballer who played as a central defender. He made nearly 600 appearances in the Football League and the Premier League, the majority of which were for Tranmere Rovers and Middlesbrough. While with Middlesbrough he played in the 1997 FA Cup Final.

== Life and career ==
Vickers was born in Bishop Auckland, County Durham, and played football for local non-League club Spennymoor United. He began his professional career at Tranmere Rovers, where he forged a reputation as one of the classiest defenders in England's lower leagues. At Tranmere he was part of the side that won the 1989–90 Football League Trophy. He subsequently played in the Premier League with Middlesbrough, whom he joined in 1993, winning the club's Player of the Year Award for the 1993–94 season. He was loaned to Crystal Palace in 2001, then to Birmingham City later that year. Whilst at Middlesbrough he played in the 1997 FA Cup Final.

This deal was then made permanent for £400,000, and Vickers helped Birmingham gain promotion to the Premier League in the 2001–02 season. He scored his only goal for the club that season, against Stockport County. Vickers retired from playing at the end of an injury-plagued 2002–03 season, which included a knee operation before the start of the season, a broken rib in his first game back, a badly-gashed ankle following a two-footed challenge from Everton's Wayne Rooney which resulted in Rooney's first senior red card, and a succession of minor problems.

After his retirement from playing, he went into property development in his native north-east of England. In 2010, he was employed as head of youth recruitment for the sports management division of a north-east-based law firm.

== Honours ==
Tranmere Rovers

- Associate Members' Cup: 1989–90; runner-up: 1990–91

Middlesbrough

- Football League First Division: 1994–95
- FA Cup runner-up: 1996–97
- Football League Cup runner-up: 1996–97, 1997–98

Birmingham City

- Football League First Division play-offs: 2002
