= Robbie Mustoe =

English footballer and commentator

Personal information
- Date of birth: 28 August 1968 (age 58)
- Place of birth: Witney, England
- Height: 5 ft 10 in (1.78 m)
- Position: Defensive midfielder

Youth career
- 1984–1986: Oxford United

Senior career*
Years	Team	Apps	(Gls)
1986–1990	Oxford United	91	(10)
1990–2002	Middlesbrough	365	(25)
2002–2003	Charlton Athletic	6	(0)
2003–2004	Sheffield Wednesday	25	(1)
Total		478	(36)

Managerial career
- 2006: Bentley Falcons (assistant)
- 2007: Boston College Eagles (assistant)
- * Club domestic league appearances and goals

Robin "Robbie" Mustoe (born 28 August 1968) is an English former professional footballer who now works as a commentator for NBC Sports.

He made nearly 500 appearances in the Football League and Premier League playing primarily as a defensive midfielder for Oxford United and Middlesbrough, but also making appearances for Charlton Athletic and Sheffield Wednesday.

== Playing career ==
Mustoe began his football career as a junior with Oxford United. He made his Football League debut in the 1986–87 Football League First Division, and went on to play nearly 100 league games for the club.

He joined Middlesbrough in 1990 for £375,000. When Bryan Robson took over as player-manager in 1994, Mustoe initially lost his place. However, he worked his way back into the side, becoming a consistent member of the first team, featured in all three of the club's Wembley finals, and shared the club's 1999 Player of the Year award with Hamilton Ricard.

When Steve McClaren took over as manager in 2001, Mustoe was 33 and not part of McLaren's future plans. However, he again worked his way back into the team and played a prominent part in the 2001–02 season. He left the club in the summer of 2002, having made more than 450 appearances in all competitions.

He played a season at Charlton Athletic before ending his professional playing career in League One with Sheffield Wednesday. At Wednesday he scored once, an injury-time winner against Brighton & Hove Albion.

In his book Woody and Nord, Gareth Southgate describes Mustoe as "one of the most honest professionals in the game".

== Coaching career ==
After retiring as a player, Mustoe moved to Lexington, Massachusetts, in the United States where he coached college soccer.

== Media work ==
Mustoe moved to the US after retiring from playing where he worked as a commentator/analyst for ESPN television for five years. He was invited into ESPN by former Boro commentator Dave Roberts. where the two worked side by side in both the TV studio and conducting soccer commentaries. Mustoe also worked alongside Adrian Healey for ESPN's La Liga, UEFA Champions League, the UEFA Euro 2008, the 2009 FIFA Confederations Cup, the 2010 FIFA World Cup in which he partnered mostly with Derek Rae, and UEFA Euro 2012 coverage. He also regularly appeared as a pundit on ESPN FC and made sporadic appearances for the network's Premier League coverage working in the studio.

In April 2013, he joined fellow British "Robbie" (Robbie Earle) on NBC as an analyst for their newly purchased English Premier League TV rights in the US market, as well as NBC's Match of the Day and Premier League Download programs.

== Honours ==
Middlesbrough

- Football League First Division: 1994–95
- FA Cup runner-up: 1996–97
- Football League Cup runner-up: 1996–97, 1997–98
