= 2003–04 Middlesbrough F.C. season =

Middlesbrough
2003–04 season
- Chairman: Steve Gibson
- Manager: Steve McClaren
- FA Premier League: 11th
- FA Cup: Fourth Round
- League Cup: Winners
- Top goalscorer: League: Juninho, Németh (8); All: Juninho (9)
- Highest home attendance: 34,738 (vs. Manchester United, Premier League); Away: 67,346 (vs. Manchester United, Premier League)
- Lowest home attendance: 10,435 (vs. Brighton, League Cup); Away: 8,046 (vs. Wigan Athletic, League Cup)
- Average home league attendance: 30,977
Home colours	Away colours

During the 2003–04 season, Middlesbrough participated in the FA Premier League.

== Team kit and sponsors ==
Middlesbrough were sponsored by Dial-a-Phone, the team's kit was produced by Errea. The home shirt consisted of a plain red shirt, red shorts and red socks with white trim. The away strip was mainly navy blue with maroon shoulders, navy shorts and navy socks, with maroon detailing.

== Season review ==
=== League review ===
To start their season, Middlesbrough lost four of their first five games (their worst start since the 1984–85 season) and taking only one point. This set the foundations for a season where they remained low in the rankings.

Middlesbrough hovered around the relegation spots for the first third of the season. However, they eventually found some form through November and December and went unbeaten for eight games which took them away from the relegation zone.

Middlesbrough's form was again inconsistent after Christmas, but they managed to pick up enough points to finish in a respectable 11th place.

=== Domestic cup review ===
The league cup campaign was the highlight of the season for Middlesbrough. It was one that would bring them their first major trophy in their 128-year history.

It started in late September with a home match against Brighton and Hove Albion and Boro low down in the league due to a terrible start. Middlesbrough made hard work of it against lower league opposition, but managed to scrape through with a 94th minute extra-time goal from Malcolm Christie.

The next round saw Boro comfortably beat Wigan Athletic 2–1 away with goals from Maccarone and Mendieta to set up a fourth round home match against Everton.

The match against Everton was a closely contested affair, which ended 0–0 after extra time - penalties were needed to decide the winner. Middlesbrough won the shoot-out 5–4, with Mark Schwarzer saving from Leon Osman and Mendieta converting the winning penalty.

The quarter finals saw Middlesbrough face Tottenham Hotspur at White Hart Lane. Spurs led most of the match through a first-minute Darren Anderton goal. It took an 86th-minute equaliser from Michael Ricketts to send the game into extra time. No goals were scored in extra time, meaning Boro had a penalty shoot out for the second successive round. The shoot out went into sudden death, but after Mauricio Taricco's penalty hit the post, Franck Queudrue converted his penalty to win the game.

Boro's semi final was a two legged match against a youthful Arsenal team. The first leg went Middlesbrough's way with them taking a 1–0 lead thanks to a Juninho goal. Arsenal boss Arsène Wenger chose a few more experienced players for the vital second leg, but to no avail: Boro won 2–1 on the night for a 3–1 aggregate win.

The final was on 29 February 2004 against Bolton Wanderers at the Millennium Stadium. The game started in the best way possible for Boro, with goals from Joseph Desire-Job and Bolo Zenden giving them an early 2–0 lead. A mistake from Mark Schwarzer let Kevin Davies get one back, and the score remained 2–1 at half time. Both teams had chances to score in the second half, but the score stayed the same, giving Boro their first ever major trophy.

The FA Cup campaign wasn't as successful. After a comfortable 2–0 win at home to Notts County, Boro were drawn against Arsenal in the fourth round. They lost the match 4–1 sending them out of the competition.

== Final league table ==
Pos	Team	Pld	W	D	L	GF	GA	GD	Pts	Qualification or relegation
9	Fulham	38	14	10	14	52	46	+6	52	
10	Birmingham City	38	12	14	12	43	48	−5	50	
11	Middlesbrough	38	13	9	16	44	52	−8	48	Qualification for the UEFA Cup first round (Note: Middlesbrough qualified as the 2003–04 Football League Cup winners.)
12	Southampton	38	12	11	15	44	45	−1	47	
13	Portsmouth	38	12	9	17	47	54	−7	45	

Source: Premier League
Rules for classification: 1) points; 2) goal difference; 3) number of goals scored.

== Squad ==
=== Senior squad ===
Note: Flags indicate national team as defined under FIFA eligibility rules; some limited exceptions apply. Players may hold more than one non-FIFA nationality.

No.	Pos.	Nation	Player
1	GK	AUS	Mark Schwarzer
2	DF	SCO	Robbie Stockdale
3	DF	FRA	Franck Queudrue
4	DF	ENG	Ugo Ehiogu
5	DF	ENG	Chris Riggott
6	DF	ENG	Gareth Southgate (captain)
7	MF	NED	George Boateng
8	FW	SVK	Szilárd Németh
9	FW	ITA	Massimo Maccarone
10	MF	BRA	Juninho
11	FW	ENG	Malcolm Christie
12	MF	ENG	Jonathan Greening
14	MF	ESP	Gaizka Mendieta (on loan from Lazio)
15	DF	ENG	Danny Mills (on loan from Leeds United)
16	FW	CMR	Joseph-Désiré Job
17	FW	ENG	Michael Ricketts
18	MF	ENG	Mark Wilson

No.	Pos.	Nation	Player
19	MF	ENG	Stewart Downing
20	MF	BRA	Doriva
21	DF	ENG	Stuart Parnaby
24	DF	ENG	Andrew Davies
25	GK	ENG	Carlo Nash
27	MF	NED	Boudewijn Zenden (on loan from Chelsea)
28	DF	ENG	Colin Cooper
31	DF	ENG	Andrew Taylor
32	MF	SCO	Allan Johnston
33	DF	ENG	David Murphy
34	MF	ENG	James Morrison (Note: Morrison was born in Darlington, England, and has represented England internationally at youth level, but also qualified to represent Scotland and made his full international debut for Scotland in May 2008)
35	GK	AUS	Brad Jones
36	GK	ENG	Ross Turnbull
37	DF	ENG	Matthew Bates
39	MF	ENG	Craig Dove
—	GK	ENG	Sam Russell
—	DF	ENG	Phil Gulliver

==== Left club during season ====
Note: Flags indicate national team as defined under FIFA eligibility rules; some limited exceptions apply. Players may hold more than one non-FIFA nationality.

No.	Pos.	Nation	Player
22	DF	ENG	Alan Wright (to Sheffield United)
23	MF	ARG	Carlos Marinelli (released)
26	FW	ENG	Noel Whelan (to Millwall)
29	MF	BRA	Ricardinho (released)

No.	Pos.	Nation	Player
37	DF	NIR	Brian Close (to Darlington)
41	FW	ENG	Jamie Cade (to Colchester United)
—	MF	NIR	Chris Brunt (to Sheffield Wednesday)

== Transfers ==
=== In ===
Date	Player	Previous club	Cost
1 July 2003	(Brazil) Doriva	(Spain) Celta Vigo	Free
4 August 2003	(England) Alan Wright	Unattached	Free
24 August 2003	(England) Danny Mills	Leeds United	Loan
28 August 2003	(Spain) Gaizka Mendieta	(Italy) Lazio	Loan (signed at end of season)
30 August 2003	(Netherlands) Boudewijn Zenden	Chelsea	Loan
2 February 2004	(Brazil) Ricardinho	(Brazil) São Paulo	Free

=== Out ===
Date	Player	New club	Cost
5 August 2003	(England) Noel Whelan	Millwall	Free
13 August 2003	(Wales) Mark Crossley	Fulham	Undisclosed
14 November 2003	(Argentina) Carlos Marinelli	Released	Free
31 October 2003	(England) Alan Wright	Sheffield United	Loan (made permanent on 12 January 2004)
30 April 2004	(Brazil) Ricardinho	Released	Free

== Premier League results ==
Win Draw Loss

Note: Results are given with Middlesbrough score listed first. Man of the Match is according to mfc.co.uk.

Matchday	1	2	3	4	5	6	7	8	9	10	11	12	13	14	15	16	17	18	19	20	21	22	23	24	25	26	27	28	29	30	31	32	33	34	35	36	37	38
Ground	A	H	A	H	A	H	A	H	H	A	H	A	H	A	H	H	A	H	H	A	H	A	H	A	A	A	H	A	H	A	H	A	H	A	H	A	H	A
Result	L	L	D	L	L	W	W	L	L	D	W	W	D	W	D	D	D	L	W	L	D	W	L	W	L	L	W	L	W	D	W	D	W	L	L	L	W	L
Position	13	19	18	19	19	17	14	17	18	17	14	12	13	10	11	11	11	15	12	14	13	12	13	13	13	11	12	10	11	11	11	9	11	12	12	11	11	11

Source: WorldFootball.com
A = Away; H = Home; W = Win; D = Draw; L = Loss

Game	Date	Venue	Opponent	Result F–A	Attendance	Boro Goalscorers	Man of the Match
1	16 August 2003	A	Fulham	2–3	14,546	Marinelli 10', Németh 81'
2	24 August 2003	H	Arsenal	0–4	29,450
3	26 August 2003	A	Leicester City	0–0	30,823		Davies
4	30 August 2003	H	Leeds United	2–3	30,414	Németh 60', Juninho 63'	Mendieta
5	13 September 2003	A	Bolton Wanderers	0–2	26,419
6	21 September 2003	H	Everton	1–0	28,113	Job 6'
7	27 September 2003	A	Southampton	1–0	30,772	Christie 13'
8	5 October 2003	H	Chelsea	1–2	29,170	Németh 46'
9	18 October 2003	H	Newcastle United	0–1	34,081
10	26 October 2003	A	Tottenham Hotspur	0–0	32,643
11	1 November 2003	H	Wolverhampton Wanderers	2–0	30,305	Mendieta 73', Juninho 83'
12	8 November 2003	A	Aston Villa	2–0	29,898	Zenden 30', Ricketts 49'(pen)
13	22 November 2003	H	Liverpool	0–0	34,268
14	29 November 2003	A	Manchester City	1–0	46,824	Sun Jihai (o.g.)
15	6 December 2003	H	Portsmouth	0–0	28031
16	13 December 2003	H	Charlton Athletic	0–0	26,721
17	26 December 2003	A	Blackburn Rovers	2–2	25,452	Juninho 31', 51'
18	28 December 2003	H	Manchester United	0–1	34,738
19	7 January 2004	H	Fulham	2–1	27,869	Job 15', Németh 67'
20	10 January 2004	A	Arsenal	1–4	38,117	Maccarone 89' (pen)
21	20 January 2004	H	Leicester City	3–3	27,125	Juninho 8', Maccarone 90', Curtis 90' (o.g.)
22	31 January 2004	A	Leeds United	3–0	35,970	Zenden 53', Job 77', Ricketts 89'(pen)
23	7 February 2004	H	Blackburn Rovers	0–1	28,307
24	11 February 2004	A	Manchester United	3–2	67,346	Juninho 34', 38', Job 80'
25	21 February 2004	A	Newcastle United	1–2	52,156	Zenden 33'
26	3 March 2004	A	Birmingham City	1–3	29,369	Németh 75'
27	9 March 2004	H	Tottenham Hotspur	1–0	31,789	Németh 73'
28	13 March 2004	A	Charlton Athletic	0–1	26,270
29	20 March 2004	H	Birmingham City	5–3	30,244	Mendieta 5', Maccarone 21', 45', Southgate 30', Németh 90'
30	27 March 2004	A	Everton	1–1	38,210	Job 83'
31	3 April 2004	H	Bolton Wanderers	2–0	30,107	Nolan 8' (o.g.), Greening 51'
32	10 April 2004	A	Chelsea	0–0	40,873
33	12 April 2004	H	Southampton	3–1	30,768	Juninho 23', Németh 32', Maccarone 49'
34	17 April 2004	A	Wolverhampton Wanderers	0–2	27,975
35	24 April 2004	H	Aston Villa	1–2	31,322	Job 41'
36	2 May 2004	A	Liverpool	0–2	42,031
37	8 May 2004	H	Manchester City	2–1	34,734	Maccarone 8', Németh 32'
38	15 May 2004	A	Portsmouth	1–5	20,134	Zenden 27'

== Cup results ==
=== League Cup ===
Round	Date	Opponent	Venue	Result	Attendance	Goalscorers
2	24 September 2003	Brighton	Home	1-0 (a.e.t.)	10,435	Christie
3	29 October 2003	Wigan	Away	2-1	8,046	Maccarone, Mendieta
4	3 December 2003	Everton	Home	0-0 (5–4 pens)	18,568	
5	17 December 2003	Tottenham	Away	1-1 (5–4 pens)	25,307	Ricketts
SF Leg 1	20 January 2004	Arsenal	Away	1-0	31,070	Juninho
SF Leg 2	3 February 2004	Arsenal	Home	2-1 (3–1 agg.)	28,046	Zenden, Reyes og
Final	29 February 2004	Bolton	Millennium Stadium	2-1	72,634	Job, Zenden (pen)

=== FA Cup ===
Round	Date	Opponent	Venue	Result	Attendance	Goalscorers
3	3 January 2004	Notts County	Home	2-0	15,061	Richardson og, Zenden
4	24 January 2004	Arsenal	Away	1-4	37,256	Job

== Player statistics ==
=== Goalscorers ===
Goalscoring statistics for 2003-04.

Name	League	FA Cup	League Cup	Total
(Brazil) Juninho	8	0	1	9
(Slovakia) Németh	8	0	0	8
(Cameroon) Job	6	1	1	8
(Netherlands) Zenden	5	1	2	8
(Italy) Maccarone	6	0	1	7
(Spain) Mendieta	2	0	1	3
(England) Ricketts	2	0	1	3
(England) Christie	1	0	1	2
(Argentina) Marinelli	1	0	0	1
(England) Greening	1	0	0	1
(England) Southgate	1	0	0	1
Own Goals	3	1	1	5

=== Appearances / Discipline ===
Appearance and disciplinary records for 2003-04 league and cup matches.

Name	Appearances	Yellow cards	Red cards
(Australia) Schwarzer	44	0	0
(Australia) Jones	2	0	0
(England) Nash	1	0	0
(England) Parnaby	9+7	2	0
(France) Queudrue	40	7	0
(England) Ehiogu	19	3	0
(England) Riggott	19+5	3	0
(England) Southgate	34	1	0
(England) Mills	37	10	0
(England) Wright	2	0	0
(England) Davies	8+2	0	0
(Scotland) Stockdale	0+2	0	0
(England) Cooper	19+2	3	0
(Spain) Mendieta	37+1	3	0
(Netherlands) Boateng	43	8	1
(Brazil) Juninho	31+7	3	0
(England) Downing	10+14	0	0
(England) Morrison	0+2	0	0
(England) Greening	21+8	5	0
(Brazil) Doriva	23+3	6	0
(Argentina) Marinelli	1	0	0
(Netherlands) Zenden	38+1	5	1
(Italy) Maccarone	18+12	2	0
(England) Ricketts	12+18	4	0
(Slovakia) Németh	20+18	2	0
(Cameroon) Job	22+7	1	0
