= 2002–03 Middlesbrough F.C. season =

Middlesbrough
2002–03 season
- Chairman: Steve Gibson
- Manager: Steve McClaren
- FA Premier League: 11th
- FA Cup: Third Round
- League Cup: Third Round
- Top goalscorer: League: Massimo Maccarone (9); All: Massimo Maccarone (9)
- Highest home attendance: 34,814 v Newcastle United (Premier League); Away: 67,464 v Manchester United (Premier League)
- Lowest home attendance: 27,433 v Southampton (Premier League); Away: 7,558 v Brentford (League Cup)
Home colours	Away colours

During the 2002–03 season, Middlesbrough participated in the FA Premier League.

== Kit ==
Middlesbrough had a new sponsor, Dial-a-Phone, for the 2002–03 season. The team's kit was produced by Errea. The home shirt consisted of a plain red shirt, red shorts and red socks with white trim. The away strip consisted of white shirts with black piping, plain white shorts and white socks with navy blue trim.

== Season review ==
Despite losing the new £6 million signing of the returning Juninho, Boro made a promising start to the 2002–03 season, peaking at third in early October. The signings of Maccarone and Boateng, along with the loan of Geremi, gave the fans real hope of a top-six finish. However, following a fantastic 3–0 win away at Spurs at the end of September which sent the club 3rd, Middlesbrough seemed to press the self-destruct button, losing the next 8 games away from home without scoring; although they remained undefeated in this period at home, this saw them sink to 12th position. This persuaded Steve McClaren to make changes, and during the January transfer window he brought in Chris Riggott and Malcolm Christie from Derby County, Michael Ricketts from Bolton Wanderers and Doriva on loan from Celta Vigo. This, coupled with the return of the now-fit Juninho, stopped the bad run of form and the results picked up a bit. Middlesbrough hovered around 14th for a few weeks before finishing 11th. Again, the season was regarded as a disappointment after the promising start.

Both cups were also a disappointment for Boro. They went out of the FA Cup in the third round, losing 1–0 at Chelsea. They fared slightly better in the League Cup, beating Brentford 4–1 in the second round but then losing to lower league opposition in the form of Ipswich Town, 3–1 away.

== Final league table ==
Pos	Team	Pld	W	D	L	GF	GA	GD	Pts	Qualification or relegation
9	Manchester City	38	15	6	17	47	54	−7	51	Qualification for the UEFA Cup qualifying round (Note: Manchester City qualified as the highest-ranked team not already qualified for European competitions of Premiership Fair Play League by The Football Association, the top association among UEFA Fair Play ranking winners.)
10	Tottenham Hotspur	38	14	8	16	51	62	−11	50	
11	Middlesbrough	38	13	10	15	48	44	+4	49	
12	Charlton Athletic	38	14	7	17	45	56	−11	49	
13	Birmingham City	38	13	9	16	41	49	−8	48	

Source: Premier League
Rules for classification: 1) points; 2) goal difference; 3) number of goals scored.

== First-team squad ==
No.	Pos	Nat	Player	Total		Premier League		FA Cup		League Cup	
No.	Pos	Nat	Player	Apps	Goals	Apps	Goals	Apps	Goals	Apps	Goals
1	GK	(Australia) AUS	Mark Schwarzer	39	0	38	0	1	0	0	0
2	DF	(Scotland) SCO	Robbie Stockdale	15	0	12+2	0	0	0	1	0
3	DF	(France) FRA	Franck Queudrue	33	2	29+2	1	1	0	1	1
4	DF	(England) ENG	Ugo Ehiogu	32	3	31+1	3	0	0	0	0
5	DF	(England) ENG	Chris Riggott	5	2	4+1	2	0	0	0	0
6	DF	(England) ENG	Gareth Southgate	37	2	36	2	1	0	0	0
7	MF	(Netherlands) NED	George Boateng	28	0	28	0	0	0	0	0
8	FW	(Slovakia) SVK	Szilárd Németh	28	7	15+13	7	0	0	0	0
9	FW	(Italy) ITA	Massimo Maccarone	34	9	26+8	9	0	0	0	0
10	MF	(Brazil) BRA	Juninho	10	3	9+1	3	0	0	0	0
11	FW	(Croatia) CRO	Alen Bokšić	19	2	13+5	2	0+1	0	0	0
12	MF	(England) ENG	Jonathan Greening	39	2	38	2	1	0	0	0
14	MF	(Cameroon) CMR	Geremi	34	7	33	7	1	0	0	0
15	DF	(Australia) AUS	Tony Vidmar	15	0	9+3	0	1	0	2	0
16	FW	(Cameroon) CMR	Joseph-Désiré Job	29	4	22+6	4	1	0	0	0
17	MF	(England) ENG	Stewart Downing	3	1	0+2	0	0	0	0+1	1
18	MF	(England) ENG	Mark Wilson	9	1	4+2	0	1	0	2	1
19	FW	(England) ENG	Malcolm Christie	12	4	11+1	4	0	0	0	0
20	MF	(Brazil) BRA	Doriva	5	0	3+2	0	0	0	0	0
20	FW	(England) ENG	Dean Windass	4	0	0+2	0	1	0	1	0
21	FW	(England) ENG	Michael Ricketts	9	1	5+4	1	0	0	0	0
23	MF	(Argentina) ARG	Carlos Marinelli	9	1	3+4	0	0	0	2	1
25	GK	(Wales) WAL	Mark Crossley	2	0	0	0	0	0	2	0
26	FW	(England) ENG	Noel Whelan	17	2	2+13	1	0+1	0	1	1
27	MF	(England) ENG	John Eustace	1	0	0+1	0	0	0	0	0
28	DF	(England) ENG	Colin Cooper	23	0	14+6	0	0+1	0	2	0
29	DF	(England) ENG	Jason Gavin	1	0	0	0	0	0	1	0
30	MF	(England) ENG	Stuart Parnaby	22	0	21	0	0	0	1	0
31	DF	(Australia) AUS	Luke Wilkshire	16	0	7+7	0	0	0	2	0
32	MF	(Scotland) SCO	Allan Johnston	2	0	0	0	0	0	2	0
33	DF	(England) ENG	David Murphy	8	0	4+4	0	0	0	0	0
34	GK	(England) ENG	Sam Russell	0	0	0	0	0	0	0	0
35	GK	(Australia) AUS	Brad Jones	0	0	0	0	0	0	0	0
37	DF	(Northern Ireland) NIR	Brian Close	1	0	0	0	0	0	0+1	0
38	DF	(England) ENG	Andrew Davies	2	0	1	0	0	0	1	0
39	MF	(England) ENG	Craig Dove	2	0	0	0	0	0	0+2	0
41	MF	(England) ENG	Jamie Cade	1	0	0	0	0	0	0+1	0
42	FW	(England) ENG	Phil Gulliver	0	0	0	0	0	0	0	0

=== Discipline ===
Disciplinary records for 2002–03 league and cup matches. Players with 1 card or more included only.

No.	Nat.	Player	Yellow cards	Red cards
1	(Australia) (Germany)	Mark Schwarzer	1	0
2	(Scotland)	Robbie Stockdale	3	0
3	(France)	Franck Queudrue	7	3
4	(England) (Nigeria)	Ugo Ehiogu	5	0
5	(England)	Chris Riggott	1	0
6	(England)	Gareth Southgate	3	0
7	(Netherlands) (Ghana)	George Boateng	6	0
9	(Italy)	Massimo Maccarone	2	0
10	(Brazil) (Italy)	Juninho Paulista	1	0
11	(Croatia)	Alen Bokšić	2	0
12	(England)	Jonathan Greening	5	0
14	(Cameroon)	Geremi Njitap	2	0
15	(Australia) (Italy)	Tony Vidmar	1	0
16	(Cameroon) (France)	Joseph-Désiré Job	1	0
18	(England)	Mark Wilson	3	1
21	(England)	Michael Ricketts	1	0
23	(Argentina) (Italy)	Carlos Marinelli	2	0
26	(England)	Noel Whelan	2	0
27	(England)	John Eustace	1	0
30	(England)	Stuart Parnaby	1	0
31	(Australia)	Luke Wilkshire	2	1
37	(Northern Ireland)	Brian Close	1	0

== Transfers ==
=== In ===
Date	Player	Previous club	Cost
4 June 2002	(Italy) Massimo Maccarone	(Italy) Empoli	£8,150,000
25 July 2002	(Cameroon) Geremi	(Spain) Real Madrid	Season-long loan
30 July 2002	(Netherlands) (Ghana) George Boateng	Aston Villa	£5,000,000
5 August 2002	(Brazil) (Italy) Juninho	(Spain) Atlético Madrid	£6,000,000
31 January 2003	(England) Malcolm Christie and Chris Riggott	Derby County	£5,000,000
31 January 2003	(England) Michael Ricketts	Bolton Wanderers	£3,500,000
31 January 2003	(Brazil) (Italy) Doriva	(Spain) Celta Vigo	Loan

=== Out ===
Date	Player	New club	Cost
6 August 2002	(England) Paul Ince	Wolverhampton Wanderers	Free
12 August 2002	(Australia) (Belgium) Paul Okon	Leeds United	Free
22 August 2002	(England) Mark Summerbell	Carlisle United	Free
29 August 2002	(England) Phil Stamp	(Scotland) Hearts	Free
30 August 2002	(England) Robbie Mustoe	Charlton Athletic	Free
15 January 2003	(England) Dean Windass	Sheffield United	Free
21 March 2003	(England) Mark Hudson	Chesterfield	Free
17 May 2003	(England) Anthony Ormerod	Scarborough	Free
2 June 2003	(Croatia) Alen Bokšić	Contract terminated	-

== Results ==
=== Premier League ===
Win Draw Loss

Note: Results are given with Middlesbrough score listed first. Man of the Match is according to mfc.co.uk.

Matchday	1	2	3	4	5	6	7	8	9	10	11	12	13	14	15	16	17	18	19	20	21	22	23	24	25	26	27	28	29	30	31	32	33	34	35	36	37	38
Ground	A	H	H	A	H	A	H	A	H	A	H	A	H	A	H	A	H	H	A	H	A	A	H	A	H	A	A	H	H	A	H	H	A	H	A	A	H	A
Result	D	D	W	L	W	L	W	W	W	L	D	L	W	L	W	L	D	D	L	W	L	L	D	L	L	D	W	D	W	W	D	W	D	L	L	L	W	L
Position	11	13	10	10	6	8	7	3	3	5	6	9	6	7	6	7	9	9	10	8	10	13	12	13	14	15	13	13	12	12	11	11	12	13	13	13	10	11

Source: WorldFootball.com
A = Away; H = Home; W = Win; D = Draw; L = Loss

Game	Date	Venue	Opponent	Result F–A	Attendance	Boro Goalscorers	Man of the Match
1	17 August 2002	A	Southampton	0–0	28,341		Schwarzer
2	24 August 2002	H	Fulham	2–2	28,588	Maccarone 32', 51'	
3	31 August 2002	H	Blackburn Rovers	1–0	28,270	Job 90'	Southgate
4	3 September 2002	A	Manchester United	0–1	67,464		
5	10 September 2002	H	Sunderland	3–0	32,155	Németh 17', 66' Maccarone 37'	
6	14 September 2002	A	Everton	1–2	32,240	Németh 11'	
7	21 September 2002	H	Birmingham City	1–0	29,869	Queudrue 29'	
8	28 September 2002	A	Tottenham Hotspur	3–0	36,082	Maccarone 33', Geremi 55', Job 58'	Maccarone
9	5 October 2002	H	Bolton Wanderers	2–0	31,005	Ehiogu 23', Geremi 68'	
10	20 October 2002	A	Charlton Athletic	0–1	26,271		
11	26 October 2002	H	Leeds United	2–2	34,723	Job 25', Southgate 83'	
12	4 November 2002	A	Newcastle United	0–2	51,558		
13	9 November 2002	H	Liverpool	1–0	34,747	Southgate 82'	Greening
14	16 November 2002	A	Chelsea	0–1	39,064		
15	23 November 2002	H	Manchester City	3–1	31,510	Ehiogu 53', Bokšić 62, Geremi 84'	
16	30 November 2002	A	West Bromwich Albion	0–1	27,029		
17	7 December 2002	H	West Ham United	2–2	28,283	Németh 58', Ehiogu 88'	
18	14 December 2002	H	Chelsea	1–1	29,160	Geremi 32'	
19	21 December 2002	A	Arsenal	0–2	38,003		
20	26 December 2002	H	Manchester United	3–1	34,673	Bokšić 44', Németh 48', Job 85'	
21	28 December 2002	A	Aston Villa	0–1	33,637		
22	1 January 2003	A	Blackburn Rovers	0–1	23,413		
23	11 January 2003	H	Southampton	2–2	27,443	Whelan 73', Maccarone 82'	
24	19 January 2003	A	Fulham	0–1	14,253		
25	28 January 2003	H	Aston Villa	2–5	27,546	Maccarone 33', Greening 35'	
26	8 February 2003	A	Liverpool	1–1	42,247	Geremi 38'	
27	22 February 2003	A	Sunderland	3–1	42,134	Riggott 21', 28', Christie 59'	
28	1 March 2003	H	Everton	1–1	32,473	Juninho 74'	
29	5 March 2003	H	Newcastle United	1–0	34,814	Geremi 62'	
30	15 March 2003	A	Leeds United	3–2	39,073	Maccarone 36', Juninho 45', Geremi 64'	
31	22 March 2003	H	Charlton Athletic	1–1	29,080	Christie 57'	
32	5 April 2003	H	West Bromwich Albion	3–0	30,187	Christie 36', Greening 76', Németh 87'	
33	12 April 2003	A	Manchester City	0–0	34,793		
34	19 April 2003	H	Arsenal	0–2	34,724		
35	21 April 2003	A	West Ham United	0–1	35,019		
36	26 April 2003	A	Birmingham City	0–3	28,821		
37	3 May 2003	H	Tottenham Hotspur	5–1	30,230	Christie 23', Juninho 26', Németh 28', Maccarone 51', 75'	
38	11 May 2003	A	Bolton Wanderers	1–2	27,241	Ricketts 61'	

=== League Cup ===
Round	Date	Opponent	Venue	Result	Attendance	Goalscorers
2	1 October 2002	Brentford	Away	4–1	7,558	Marinelli, Whelan, Wilson, Downing
3	6 November 2002	Ipswich Town	Away	1–3	14,417	Queudrue

=== FA Cup ===
Round	Date	Opponent	Venue	Result	Attendance	Goalscorers
3	4 January 2003	Chelsea	Away	1–0	29,796	

== Statistics ==
=== Overview ===
Competition	Record							
Competition	P	W	D	L	GF	GA	GD	Win %
Premier League	38	13	10	15	48	44	+4	34.21
FA Cup	1	0	0	1	0	1	−1	0.00
League Cup	2	1	0	1	5	4	+1	50.00
Total	41	14	10	17	53	49	+4	34.15

=== Goalscorers ===
Goalscoring statistics for 2002–03.

Name	League	FA Cup	League Cup	Total
(Italy) Massimo Maccarone	9	0	0	9
(Slovakia) Németh	7	0	0	7
(Cameroon) Geremi	7	0	0	7
(Cameroon) (France) Job	4	0	0	4
(England) (Nigeria) Ehiogu	3	0	0	3
(England) Christie	4	0	0	4
(Brazil) (Italy) Juninho	3	0	0	3
(Croatia) Bokšić	2	0	0	2
(England) Greening	2	0	0	2
(England) Riggott	2	0	0	2
(France) Queudrue	1	0	1	2
(England) Whelan	1	0	1	2
(England) Ricketts	1	0	0	1
(Argentina) (Italy) Marinelli	0	0	1	1
(England) Wilson	0	0	1	1
(England) Downing	0	0	1	1
(England) Southgate	2	0	0	2

=== Appearances and discipline ===
Appearance and disciplinary records for 2002–03 league and cup matches.

Name	Appearances	Yellow cards	Red cards
(Australia) (Germany) Schwarzer	39	1	0
(Wales) Crossley	2	0	0
(England) Parnaby	23	1	0
(France) Queudrue	33	7	3
(England) (Nigeria) Ehiogu	32	5	0
(England) Riggott	5	1	0
(England) Southgate	37	3	0
(Republic of Ireland) Gavin	1	0	0
(Republic of Ireland) Close	1	1	0
(Australia) (Italy) Vidmar	15	2	0
(England) Davies	2	0	0
(England) Stockdale	15	3	0
(England) Cooper	23	1	0
(England) Murphy	8	0	0
(Netherlands) (Ghana) Boateng	28	6	0
(Brazil) (Italy) Juninho	10	1	0
(England) Downing	3	0	0
(Cameroon) Geremi	34	2	0
(England) Greening	39	6	0
(Scotland) Johnston	2	0	0
(England) Dove	2	0	0
(England) Eustace	1	1	0
(England) Wilson	9	3	1
(Brazil) (Italy) Doriva	5	0	0
(Argentina) (Italy) Marinelli	9	1	0
(Australia) Wilkshire	16	1	1
(England) Christie	12	0	0
(Italy) Maccarone	34	3	0
(England) Ricketts	9	1	0
(England) Whelan	17	3	0
(England) Windass	4	1	0
(Slovakia) Németh	30	0	0
(Croatia) Bokšić	19	2	0
(Cameroon) (France) Job	29	1	0
