= Mark Wilson (English footballer) =

English footballer

Personal information
- Full name: Mark Antony Wilson
- Date of birth: 9 February 1979 (age 47)
- Place of birth: Scunthorpe, England
- Position: Midfielder

Youth career
- 1995–1997: Manchester United

Senior career*
Years	Team	Apps	(Gls)
1997–2001	Manchester United	3	(0)
1997–1998	→ Wrexham (loan)	13	(4)
2001–2005	Middlesbrough	16	(0)
2002–2003	→ Stoke City (loan)	4	(0)
2003	→ Swansea City (loan)	12	(2)
2003–2004	→ Sheffield Wednesday (loan)	3	(0)
2004	→ Doncaster Rovers (loan)	3	(0)
2004–2005	→ Livingston (loan)	5	(0)
2005–2006	FC Dallas	20	(1)
2006–2012	Doncaster Rovers	141	(3)
2008	→ Tranmere Rovers (loan)	5	(0)
2011	→ Walsall (loan)	4	(0)
2012	Oxford United	6	(0)
2012	Gainsborough Trinity	4	(0)
2013	Doncaster Rovers	0	(0)
Total		239	(10)

International career
2000	England U21	1	(0)
- * Club domestic league appearances and goals

Mark Antony Wilson (born 9 February 1979) is an English former footballer who played as a midfielder. He represented England at Under-21 level. He is currently the technical director for NWSL club Orlando Pride.

== Career ==
=== Manchester United ===
Wilson was born in Scunthorpe and began his career as a trainee with Manchester United, turning professional in August 1997. He joined Wrexham on loan in February 1998 until the end of that season and made his league debut for Wrexham on 24 February 1998 when he came on as a 38th-minute substitute for injured goalkeeper Mark Cartwright in the game away to Burnley. With the score at 1–1 and no reserve keeper on the bench, midfielder Gareth Owen went in goal and Wrexham went on to win with Wilson scoring the winner. He finally made his Manchester United debut on 28 October, starting the 2–0 League Cup win at home to Bury, and played once more that season, again in the League Cup.

=== Middlesbrough ===
Having failed to establish himself at Old Trafford, despite appearing in both the Champions League and the Premier League, Wilson left to join Middlesbrough in August 2001 for £1.5 million, as part of a £3.5 million deal that also took his teammate Jonathan Greening to the Riverside. Unable to settle at Boro, but scoring twice in the League Cup against Northampton and Brentford, he had loan spells with Stoke City, Swansea City, Sheffield Wednesday, Doncaster Rovers, and finally Livingston.

=== FC Dallas ===
After several loan spells over the previous seasons, Wilson left Middlesbrough for FC Dallas in the spring of 2005; however, it took until 1 September 2005 for him getting clearance to play for the MLS side. He was released by Dallas in August 2006 after deciding to return home to England after having played 20 league games, scoring 1 goal, having an unsuccessful trial with Bradford City in October that year.

=== Doncaster Rovers ===
After his unsuccessful trial at Bradford, Wilson joined League One side Doncaster Rovers on a short-term contract the following month, and, during the January 2007 transfer window, signed an 18-month contract. At Doncaster, Wilson was a regular for the club under Sean O'Driscoll, but suffered a hernia problem, which left him struggling to force his way back into contention having lost his place in the side to Paul Green. Despite this, Wilson signed a two-year deal at the end of the 2007–08 season. In November 2008, he joined Tranmere Rovers on a one-month loan deal after making seven Championship starts. Wilson renewed his contract with Rovers in the summer of 2010, keeping him at the club until the summer of 2012. To get first team opportunities, Wilson joined Walsall on a one-month loan from Doncaster Rovers in November 2011 and played six games (scoring one goal against Exeter City in the FA Cup) before being recalled by Doncaster on 28 November 2011. In the 2011–12 season, his final season at Doncaster Rovers, he failed to make a single start, with his contract being cancelled by mutual consent in January. Wilson made 110 starts along with 47 substitute appearances for Rovers in all competitions during his time at the club.

=== Later career ===
On the last day of the January 2012 transfer window, Oxford United signed Wilson on a free transfer (along with Scott Rendell on loan). In May 2012, Wilson was released by the club after being deemed surplus to requirements, having made just six league appearances.

Gainsborough Trinity took on Mark in December 2012 on a match by match basis, his first game being at Bradford Park Avenue on 17 December 2012.

He resigned for Doncaster on a non-contractual basis on 7 March 2013, though didn't make any appearances and wasn't with the club at the beginning of the following season. He later worked as a regional director of youth coaching in the north-east of the United States.

On 14 May 2024 Angel City FC of the National Women's Soccer League announced they had hired Wilson as the clubs first-ever Technical Director.

On 28 March 2026 Orlando Pride announced the appointment of Wilson as the club’s first‑ever technical director.

== Career statistics ==
Appearances and goals by club, season and competition
Club	Season	League			National Cup		League Cup		Other		Total	
Club	Season	Division	Apps	Goals	Apps	Goals	Apps	Goals	Apps	Goals	Apps	Goals
Manchester United	1997–98	Premier League	0	0	0	0	0	0	0	0	0	0
Manchester United	1998–99	Premier League	0	0	0	0	2	0	1 (Note: Appearance(s) in UEFA Champions League)	0	3	0
Manchester United	1999–2000	Premier League	3	0	—		0	0	4 (Note: Three appearances in UEFA Champions League; one appearance in FIFA Club World Cup)	0	7	0
Manchester United	2000–01	Premier League	0	0	0	0	0	0	0	0	0	0
Manchester United	Total		3	0	0	0	2	0	5	0	10	0
Wrexham (loan)	1997–98	Second Division	13	4	0	0	0	0	4 (Note: Appearance(s) in FAW Invitation Cup)	3	17	7
Middlesbrough	2001–02	Premier League	10	0	2	0	2	1	—		14	1
Middlesbrough	2002–03	Premier League	6	0	1	0	2	1	—		9	1
Middlesbrough	2003–04	Premier League	0	0	0	0	0	0	—		0	0
Middlesbrough	2004–05	Premier League	0	0	0	0	1	0	0	0	1	0
Middlesbrough	Total		16	0	3	0	5	2	0	0	24	2
Stoke City (loan)	2002–03	First Division	4	0	0	0	0	0	—		4	0
Swansea City (loan)	2003–04	Third Division	12	2	0	0	0	0	1 (Note: Appearance(s) in Football League Trophy)	0	13	2
Sheffield Wednesday (loan)	2003–04	Second Division	3	0	0	0	0	0	0	0	3	0
Doncaster Rovers (loan)	2004–05	League One	3	0	0	0	0	0	1	0	4	0
Livingston (loan)	2004–05	Scottish Premier League	5	0	1	0	0	0	—		6	0
FC Dallas	2005	Major League Soccer	8	0	2	0	—		2 (Note: Appearance(s) in MLS Cup playoffs)	0	12	0
FC Dallas	2006	Major League Soccer	12	1	0	0	—		0	0	12	1
FC Dallas	Total		20	1	2	0	—		2	0	24	1
Doncaster Rovers	2006–07	League One	22	1	1	0	0	0	5	0	28	1
Doncaster Rovers	2007–08	League One	31	1	0	0	2	0	1	0	34	1
Doncaster Rovers	2008–09	Championship	22	1	1	0	1	0	—		24	1
Doncaster Rovers	2009–10	Championship	35	0	2	0	1	0	—		38	0
Doncaster Rovers	2010–11	Championship	28	0	2	0	0	0	—		30	0
Doncaster Rovers	2011–12	Championship	3	0	0	0	1	0	—		4	0
Doncaster Rovers	Total		141	3	6	0	5	0	6	0	158	3
Tranmere Rovers (loan)	2008–09	League One	5	0	0	0	0	0	0	0	5	0
Walsall (loan)	2011–12	League One	4	0	2	1	0	0	0	0	6	1
Oxford United	2011–12	League Two	6	0	0	0	0	0	0	0	6	0
Gainsborough Trinity	2012–13	Conference North	4	0	0	0	—		0	0	4	0
Doncaster Rovers	2012–13	League One	0	0	0	0	0	0	0	0	0	0
Career total			239	10	14	1	12	2	19	3	284	16

== Honours ==
Doncaster Rovers

- Football League One: 2012–13
- EFL Trophy: 2006–07

Manchester United

- UEFA Champions League: 1998–99

Individual

- Denzil Haroun Reserve Team Player of the Year: 1998–99
