= Jonathan Greening =

English footballer and coach

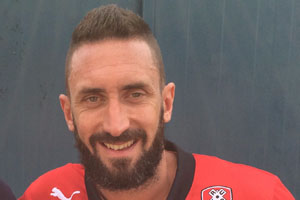
- Greening in 2014

Personal information
- Full name: Jonathan Greening
- Date of birth: 2 January 1979 (age 47)
- Place of birth: Scarborough, England
- Height: 5 ft 11 in (1.80 m)
- Position: Midfielder

Youth career
- 1994–1996: York City

Senior career*
Years	Team	Apps	(Gls)
1996–1998	York City	25	(2)
1998–2001	Manchester United	14	(0)
2001–2004	Middlesbrough	99	(4)
2004–2010	West Bromwich Albion	196	(7)
2009–2010	→ Fulham (loan)	23	(1)
2010–2011	Fulham	10	(0)
2011–2014	Nottingham Forest	49	(0)
2012	→ Barnsley (loan)	6	(1)
2014–2015	Tadcaster Albion	15	(5)
2015	York City	3	(0)
2015–2017	Tadcaster Albion	33	(2)
Total		473	(22)

International career
1998	England U18	1	(0)
1999–2002	England U21	17	(3)

Managerial career
- 2021–: Scarborough Athletic
- * Club domestic league appearances and goals

Jonathan Greening (born 2 January 1979) is an English professional football coach and former player who is the manager of Scarborough Athletic of the National League North.

As a player, Greening played as a midfielder. He began his career in 1996 with York City, but moved to Manchester United in 1998, with whom he won the 1998–99 UEFA Champions League as a non-playing substitute in the final. However, he failed to make a breakthrough in the Manchester United first team and followed United assistant manager Steve McClaren to Middlesbrough in 2001. During his time at Middlesbrough, Greening earned his first call-up to the England national team, but he did not make an appearance. In 2004, he joined West Bromwich Albion for £1.25 million, and, in 2008, captained the team to the Championship title. Greening signed for Fulham in 2009 and helped them to the 2010 UEFA Europa League final, before signing permanently the following summer. He signed for Nottingham Forest in 2011 and had a three-year spell with the club.

== Club career ==
=== York City ===
Born in Scarborough, North Yorkshire, Greening joined the York City youth system at the age of 15. He signed with the club's Youth Training Scheme in December 1996 and broke into the first team towards the end of the 1996–97 season, making his debut as substitute in a 1–1 draw away to AFC Bournemouth on 22 March 1997.

=== Manchester United ===
Following a four-day trial with Manchester United in February, he signed for the Premier League team on 25 March 1998 for what was understood to be an initial fee of £500,000, which could have potentially risen to £2 million dependent on appearances and international recognition, with a sell-on clause. He later admitted that he signed for United on £400 a week without looking at the contract. As an attacking midfielder, he faced massive competition from more established players in both positions and his first-team opportunities were restricted, although he did make the substitute's bench in the 1999 UEFA Champions League final. He later admitted that he "felt a bit of a fraud" for picking up his winner's medal, having not played a single minute of European football that season. He did however make a contribution to their victorious FA Cup campaign, coming on as a substitute at half-time in their fifth round tie with future club Fulham.

Greening signed a new contract with United at the end of 1999–2000, but by 2001 he had become frustrated by the lack of first-team opportunities, and conceded that he would need to leave the club in order to play regularly.

=== Middlesbrough ===
On 9 August 2001, Greening joined Middlesbrough for a combined fee of £3 million which saw both him and United teammate Mark Wilson head to Teesside to rejoin former Manchester United assistant manager Steve McClaren, who was by now the manager of Middlesbrough. Greening remained on Teesside for three seasons, being voted Club Player of the Year for 2002–03 and also being selected for the full England squad (though he did not play). But his first-team chances were more limited during 2003–04, after which he signed for West Bromwich Albion for an initial fee of £1.25 million. Greening was part of Middlesbrough's 2004 League Cup-winning team, despite not making the squad for the final.

=== West Bromwich Albion ===
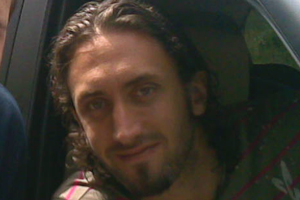
Greening in 2007

Greening made his Albion debut in a 1–1 draw away to Blackburn Rovers on the opening day of the 2004–05 Premier League season, and quickly established himself as a key player in the Baggies' midfield, helping to secure their Premier League survival in his first season. He was named Albion's Player of the Year in 2005–06, in which he made 41 appearances and scored 2 goals as the club was relegated to the Championship.

He signed a new three-year contract with Albion in August 2007, and was made club captain for 2007–08. His performances during the campaign led to him being named in the Championship Team of the Week on several occasions. Greening missed the fifth round FA Cup match at Coventry City due to suspension, but it was the only match he missed during the campaign; he started all 46 league matches and also participated in eight out of nine cup games. He captained Albion in the FA Cup semi-final, where they lost 1–0 to Portsmouth, and one month later led the team to promotion as winners of the Championship. Greening was named in the 2007–08 Championship PFA Team of the Year, alongside teammates Paul Robinson and Kevin Phillips. During the last two months of the season Greening suffered from a double hernia problem but played on until the end of the campaign, when he had an operation to rectify the injury.

Towards the end of 2008–09, Greening said he was looking to sign a new contract with Albion. He was offered a new four-year contract by the club, but instead handed in a transfer request in July 2009.

=== Fulham ===
On 14 July 2009, West Brom rejected a "derisory" bid from Fulham for Greening. Nevertheless, on 24 August 2009, Greening joined Fulham on a season-long loan for 2009–10, with a view to a permanent move upon completion of the loan period. He scored his first and only league goal for Fulham against Portsmouth on 3 February 2010. He also came off the bench in the 2010 UEFA Europa League final defeat against Atlético Madrid.

Greening signed a two-year contract with Fulham on 1 July 2010 after a successful loan spell the previous season. After signing, he was mainly used as a substitute and was seen as a 'fringe' player. Under new manager Mark Hughes, he rarely featured, making only 10 league appearances in 2010–11.

=== Nottingham Forest ===
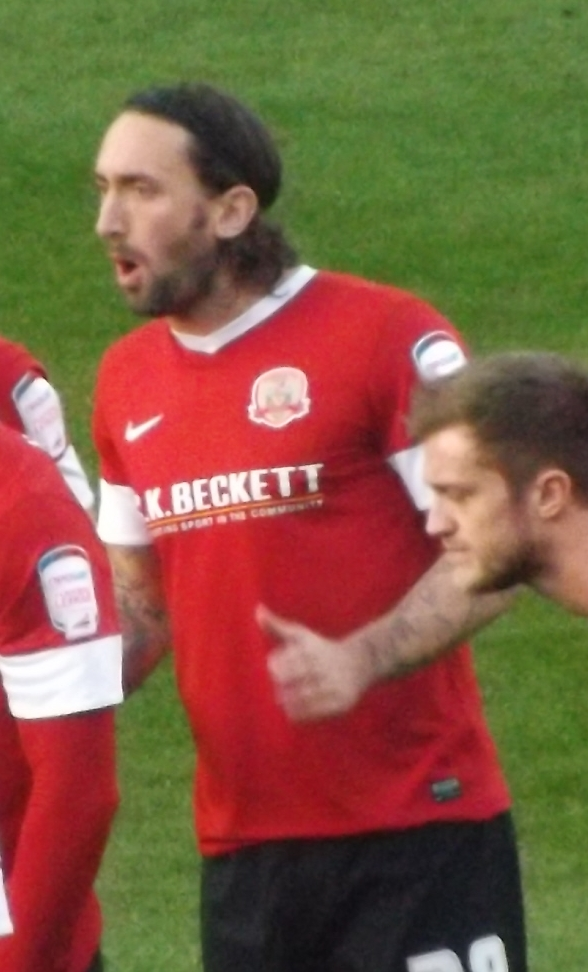
Greening playing for Barnsley in 2012

On 18 July 2011, Greening signed a three-year contract with Championship club Nottingham Forest for an undisclosed fee, reuniting with manager Steve McClaren for the second time after working with him at both Manchester United and Middlesbrough. Greening said the move met his desire to seek regular football. He took up a coaching role with Forest's under-21 team in July 2013, after attaining UEFA 'B' and 'A' Licences over the summer. Greening made 13 appearances for Forest in 2013–14 before being released by the club in May 2014.

== International career ==
Greening made his only appearance for the England national under-18 team as a substitute for Danny Cadamarteri in a 1–0 home defeat to France on 23 April 1998. His first cap for the under-21 team came after starting the 2–2 away draw with Hungary on 27 April 1999, with his first goal coming in the 61st minute of a 6–1 home win over Georgia on 31 August 2000. Greening was drafted into the England squad for the 2002 UEFA European Under-21 Championship as a replacement for the injured Michael Carrick, two days prior to their first match of the tournament. He played in the final Group A match, a 3–1 loss to Portugal on 22 May 2002, with England being eliminated from the tournament after finishing bottom of Group A. This proved to be the final of his 17 appearances for the under-21s, for whom he scored three goals. Greening was also called up to the full England squad by Sven Goran Eriksson but failed to make an appearance.

== Style of play ==
Although naturally right-sided, Greening could operate anywhere across the midfield. Initially an attacking wide midfielder, he later moved to a central midfield holding role. Teammate Dean Kiely described how Greening "sprays passes around like a quarterback" in Albion's style of attacking football under Tony Mowbray.

== Coaching career ==
Greening began assisting with coaching the academy team of his former club York, then in League Two, during the summer of 2014, before retiring from playing professionally during September 2014. He signed for Northern Counties East League Premier Division club Tadcaster Albion on 19 September 2014, where his younger brother Josh played, making his debut the next day in a 6–0 away win over Maltby Main. Greening was appointed as Development Phase Coach at York's Academy on 22 December 2014, a role focusing on the development of the team's players aged 16 to 18.

He registered as a player with York on non-contract terms on 13 November 2015, to provide cover with a number of midfielders unavailable. His second York debut came two days later as a half-time substitute for Rhys Turner in a 2–1 home defeat to Plymouth Argyle; according to The Press, he "inspired an improved second-half display ". Greening was sent off for violent conduct after elbowing Michael Doyle on his third appearance, in a 6–0 away defeat to Portsmouth on 24 November 2015, for which he received a three-match suspension. He left the club by mutual consent on 16 December 2015, despite offering only days earlier to carry on playing for the rest of 2015–16. Greening rejoined Tadcaster on 30 December 2015. He made 21 appearances and scored one goal in 2015–16 as Tadcaster won the Northern Counties East League Premier Division title, and thus promotion to the Northern Premier League Division One North.

He has worked as a coach alongside Richard Cresswell at i2i International Soccer Academy, which is based in York, England.

== Managerial career ==
His first managerial appointment was as head coach/manager of Northern Premier League side Scarborough Athletic, on 21 May 2021. During his first season with the club, he led them to promotion from the Northern Premier League and also won the North Riding Senior Cup. His impressive start to management continued into the new season, Scarborough finishing 2022 in third position, just two points off top spot, which lead to Greening winning the December 2022 Manager of the Month Award. On 24 December 2022, Greening signed a three-year contract with Scarborough, committing him with the club until the end of 2025.

== Personal life ==
Greening married Anna Stubbings, in North Yorkshire, during the second quarter of 2002. He was the joint best man at former York City teammate Richard Cresswell's wedding held June 2003.

== Career statistics ==
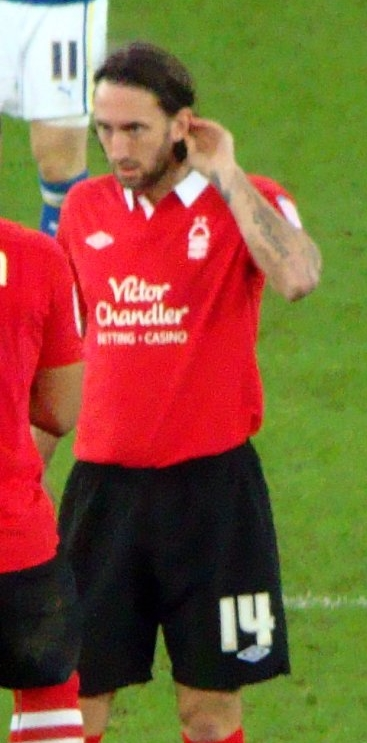
Greening playing for Nottingham Forest in 2011

Appearances and goals by club, season and competition
Club	Season	League			FA Cup		League Cup		Europe		Other		Total	
Club	Season	Division	Apps	Goals	Apps	Goals	Apps	Goals	Apps	Goals	Apps	Goals	Apps	Goals
York City	1996–97	Second Division	5	0	0	0	0	0	—		0	0	5	0
York City	1997–98	Second Division	20	2	0	0	1	0	—		1 (Note: Appearance in Football League Trophy)	0	22	2
York City	Total		25	2	0	0	1	0	—		1	0	27	2
Manchester United	1997–98	Premier League	0	0	—		—		—		—		0	0
Manchester United	1998–99	Premier League	3	0	1	0	3	0	0	0	0	0	7	0
Manchester United	1999–2000	Premier League	4	0	0	0	1	0	3 (Note: One appearance in UEFA Super Cup, two in UEFA Champions League)	0	1 (Note: Appearance in FIFA Club World Championship)	0	9	0
Manchester United	2000–01	Premier League	7	0	0	0	2	0	2 (Note: Appearances in UEFA Champions League)	0	0	0	11	0
Manchester United	Total		14	0	1	0	6	0	5	0	1	0	27	0
Middlesbrough	2001–02	Premier League	36	1	4	0	1	0	—		—		41	1
Middlesbrough	2002–03	Premier League	38	2	1	0	0	0	—		—		39	2
Middlesbrough	2003–04	Premier League	25	1	0	0	4	0	—		—		29	1
Middlesbrough	Total		99	4	5	0	5	0	—		—		109	4
West Bromwich Albion	2004–05	Premier League	34	0	2	0	1	0	—		—		37	0
West Bromwich Albion	2005–06	Premier League	38	2	2	0	1	0	—		—		41	2
West Bromwich Albion	2006–07	Championship	42	2	4	0	3	1	—		3 (Note: Appearances in Championship play-offs)	0	52	3
West Bromwich Albion	2007–08	Championship	46	1	5	0	3	0	—		—		54	1
West Bromwich Albion	2008–09	Premier League	34	2	3	0	1	0	—		—		38	2
West Bromwich Albion	2009–10	Championship	2	0	—		0	0	—		—		2	0
West Bromwich Albion	Total		196	7	16	0	9	1	—		3	0	224	8
Fulham (loan)	2009–10	Premier League	23	1	3	0	1	0	7 (Note: Appearance(s) in UEFA Europa League)	0	—		34	1
Fulham	2010–11	Premier League	10	0	2	1	2	0	—		—		14	1
Fulham	2011–12	Premier League	—		—		—		1	0	—		1	0
Fulham	Total		33	1	5	1	3	0	8	0	—		49	2
Nottingham Forest	2011–12	Championship	31	0	2	0	3	0	—		—		36	0
Nottingham Forest	2012–13	Championship	5	0	0	0	1	0	—		—		6	0
Nottingham Forest	2013–14	Championship	13	0	0	0	0	0	—		—		13	0
Nottingham Forest	Total		49	0	2	0	4	0	—		—		55	0
Barnsley (loan)	2012–13	Championship	6	1	—		—		—		—		6	1
Tadcaster Albion	2014–15	Northern Counties East League Premier Division	15	5	—		—		—		6 (Note: Three appearances in FA Vase, three in West Riding County Cup)	0	21	5
York City	2015–16	League Two	3	0	—		—		—		—		3	0
Tadcaster Albion	2015–16	Northern Counties East League Premier Division	17	1	—		—		—		4 (Note: Appearances in Northern Counties East League League Cup)	1	21	2
Tadcaster Albion	2016–17	Northern Premier League Division One North	16	1	1	0	—		—		6 (Note: One appearance in FA Trophy, four appearances and four goals in West Riding County Cup, one appearance in Northern Counties East League League Cup)	4	23	5
Tadcaster Albion	Total		33	2	1	0	—		—		10	5	44	7
Career total			473	22	30	1	28	1	13	0	21	5	565	29

== Managerial statistics ==
As of 2 March 2024

Managerial record by team and tenure
Team	Nat	From	To	Record					Ref
Team	Nat	From	To	G	W	D	L	Win %	Ref
Scarborough Athletic	(England)	21 May 2021	Present	151	69	37	45	45.70	
Total				151	69	37	45	45.70	—

== Honours ==
=== Player ===
Manchester United

- UEFA Champions League: 1998–99

Middlesbrough

- Football League Cup: 2003–04

West Bromwich Albion

- Football League Championship: 2007–08

Tadcaster Albion

- Northern Counties East Football League Premier Division: 2015–16

Individual

- Denzil Haroun Reserve Team Player of the Year: 1999–2000
- West Bromwich Albion Player of the Year: 2005–06
- PFA Team of the Year: 2007–08 Championship

=== Manager ===
Scarborough Athletic

- Northern Premier League play-offs: 2022
- North Riding Senior Cup: 2021–22, 2022–23

Individual

- National League North Manager of the Month: December 2022
