= 2004 Football League Cup final =

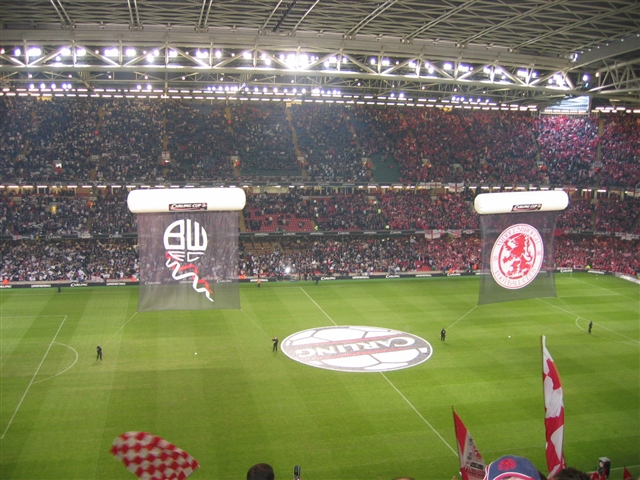
- The pre-match ceremony
- Event: 2003–04 Football League Cup
Bolton Wanderers	Middlesbrough
1	2
- Date: 29 February 2004
- Venue: Millennium Stadium, Cardiff
- Man of the Match: Boudewijn Zenden (Middlesbrough)
- Referee: Mike Riley (West Yorkshire)
- Attendance: 72,634

The 2004 Football League Cup final (known as the Carling Cup final for sponsorship reasons) was a football match that took place on 29 February 2004 at the Millennium Stadium, Cardiff. It was the final match of the 2003–04 Football League Cup, the 44th edition of the Football League Cup, a competition for the 92 teams in the Premier League and The Football League.

It was contested between Premier League sides Bolton Wanderers and Middlesbrough, both of whom had never won in their previous appearances in the final. Bolton's run to the final included a win away to holders Liverpool in the fourth round, while requiring extra time against Southampton in the next round and losing the second leg of the semi-final against Aston Villa. Middlesbrough needed extra time against Brighton & Hove Albion in their first game, and later advanced on penalty shoot-outs against top-flight Everton and Tottenham Hotspur; they then won home and away against league leaders Arsenal in the semi-finals.

Middlesbrough scored two goals in the first seven minutes, from Joseph-Désiré Job and a Boudewijn Zenden penalty. Kevin Davies got a goal back in the first half after an error by Boro goalkeeper Mark Schwarzer, but Middlesbrough kept the score at 2–1 for their first major trophy. In doing so, they qualified for the 2004–05 UEFA Cup, their first European competition.

== Background ==
Bolton were playing in their second League Cup final, having lost the 1995 edition 2–1 to Liverpool. Middlesbrough too had never previously won the competition: in 1997 they lost the final after extra time in a replay against Leicester City, and a year later they lost 2–0 to Chelsea after extra time. In 1997, they also lost the FA Cup final to Chelsea, and were relegated from the Premier League. Although Middlesbrough, founded in 1876, were without a major trophy, Bolton had 4 FA Cups from 7 finals between 1894 and 1958.

Bolton and Middlesbrough had already met once in the league season, at the former's Reebok Stadium on 13 September 2003. The hosts won 2–0 with goals by Bruno Ngotty and Kevin Davies in each half for a first victory of the campaign.

== Route to the final ==
=== Bolton Wanderers ===
Round	Opponents	Score
2nd	Walsall (h)	3–1
3rd	Gillingham (h)	2–0
4th	Liverpool (a)	2–3
5th	Southampton (h)	1–0 (aet)
SF	Aston Villa (h)	5–2
SF	Aston Villa (a)	0–2

As a Premier League team, Bolton began in the second round, hosting Walsall of the First Division at the Reebok Stadium. They won 3–1 with two goals – one a penalty kick – by Brazilian debutant Mário Jardel. In the next round on 28 October, they again hosted a second-tier team, this time Gillingham, and won 2–0 with goals by Stelios Giannakopoulos and Henrik Pedersen, in front of a notably low crowd of 5,258.

In the fourth round, Bolton had their first trip, and their first game against top-flight opposition, facing defending champions Liverpool at Anfield on 3 December. Jardel scored the first goal within five minutes, with Danny Murphy equalising with 20 minutes remaining. Youri Djorkaeff would have put Bolton back into the lead, but referee Mike Riley disallowed it for an earlier handball; they scored minutes later from Jay-Jay Okocha's free kick. Liverpool got a second equaliser from a 25-yard Vladimír Šmicer strike, but with a minute remaining Salif Diao fouled Kevin Davies in the penalty area and Djorkaeff sent the resulting spot-kick past Liverpool goalkeeper Jerzy Dudek to win the game. Thirteen days later, in extra time at home to the Premier League's Southampton, Pedersen volleyed the only goal with five minutes remaining.

On 21 January 2004, Bolton hosted Aston Villa in the first leg of an all-Premier League semi-final. Okocha gave them the lead with a second-minute free kick, and further strikes from Kevin Nolan and Stelios gave them a 3–0 lead after 17 minutes, with Juan Pablo Ángel getting one back for the visitors soon after. Ángel got another goal in the second half, before Ngotty's header and a second Okocha free kick gave Bolton a 5–2 victory. Six days later in the second leg at Villa Park, Bolton lost 2–0 to a Villa team who had Gavin McCann sent off in the first half, but advanced to the final 5–4 on aggregate.

=== Middlesbrough ===
Round	Opponents	Score
2nd	Brighton & Hove Albion (h)	1–0 (aet)
3rd	Wigan Athletic (a)	1–2
4th	Everton (h)	0–0 (aet); 5–4 (pen.)
5th	Tottenham Hotspur (a)	1–1 (aet); 5–4 (pen.)
SF	Arsenal (a)	1–0
SF	Arsenal (h)	2–1

Middlesbrough, also of the Premier League, began the competition in the second round by hosting Brighton Hove Albion at the Riverside Stadium, and defeated the Second Division team 1–0 with a goal from Malcolm Christie at the start of extra time. In the next round, they travelled to Wigan Athletic of the First Division and won 2–1 with Massimo Maccarone and Gaizka Mendieta's first goals of the season, despite the hosts at the JJB Stadium scoring a late free kick through Jimmy Bullard.

They met their first top-flight opposition in the fourth round, hosting Everton. After 120 goalless minutes, the match went to a penalty shoot-out in which Mendieta scored the winner after Middlesbrough goalkeeper Mark Schwarzer saved from Leon Osman. The quarter-final at another Premier League team, Tottenham Hotspur, also went to a shoot-out. Darren Anderton scored for the hosts within 63 seconds, the first goal Boro conceded for over 11 hours. With four minutes to play, Middlesbrough striker Michael Ricketts equalised after a cross from George Boateng. The shoot-out, in which Schwarzer denied Mauricio Taricco and Kasey Keller blocked from Mendieta, went to sudden death, in which Middlesbrough's goalkeeper saved from Gus Poyet and Franck Queudrue scored Boro's winner.

In the semi-finals, Boro faced Arsenal, the leaders and eventual unbeaten champions of the Premier League season. In the first leg at Highbury on 20 January 2004, Queudrue exploited a mistake by Arsenal defender Martin Keown and passed to Mendieta, who then assisted Juninho for the only goal of the game. On 3 February, Boro hosted Arsenal in the second leg; Keown was sent off at the end of the first half for a professional foul on Maccarone. In the second half, Boudewijn Zenden put Middlesbrough ahead and Edu equalised. With five minutes remaining, Arsenal's José Antonio Reyes scored an own goal by deflecting Stuart Parnaby's shot, making Middlesbrough advance to the final 3–1 on aggregate.

== Match ==
=== Pre-match ===
Bolton manager Sam Allardyce, who was building a reputation for signing unwanted foreign veterans such as Ngotty, Djorkaeff and Iván Campo, predicted that a win would help him sign more players in the summer. However, he thought that success would also lead his 13 players who would be out of contract, to demand more money for a renewal.

On-loan Middlesbrough right-back Danny Mills, a self-acknowledged "hate figure" from opposition fans due to his physical style of play, declared that he would ignore any abuse from Bolton fans.

=== Summary ===
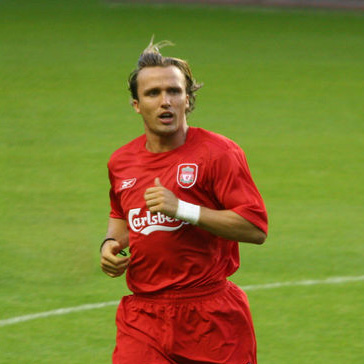
Boudewijn Zenden (pictured playing for Liverpool in 2005) assisted Middlesbrough's first goal and scored their second. He received the Alan Hardaker Trophy for the final's man of the match.

Middlesbrough manager Steve McClaren had not even sat down when his team took the lead. Mendieta's pass let Zenden run down the left wing and cross for striker Joseph-Désiré Job to put Middlesbrough ahead in the second minute. It was the fastest goal scored in a final, a record broken the following year by Liverpool's John Arne Riise.

After Job's early goal, Bolton went on the attack, with Djorkaeff forcing Schwarzer to make a near-post save. In the seventh minute however, Middlesbrough won a penalty when Job was tripped in the Bolton box by Emerson Thome. Zenden stepped up to take the spot kick and beat Bolton goalkeeper Jussi Jääskeläinen, despite slipping and the goalkeeper's foot touching the ball. Replays showed that Zenden kicked the ball twice as he slipped. Later, Thome nearly scored an own goal from Juninho's cross.

Davies scored for Bolton on 21 minutes when an error by Middlesbrough goalkeeper Schwarzer allowed his shot to go inside his near post. Bolton continued to attack, and Schwarzer made a double save from winger Per Frandsen and Djorkaeff. The latter had two more chances soon after, missing the target with the first. Boro pleaded for a second penalty when Nicky Hunt pulled Job, but referee Riley did not give it.

The second half had fewer incidents. Schwarzer saved a header from Nolan, while Juninho had two opportunities for Middlesbrough. In the final few minutes, Thome made a crucial block against Mendieta, and at the other side of the pitch Ugo Ehiogu did the same to thwart Stelios.

=== Match details ===
29 February 2004
14:00

Bolton Wanderers	1–2	Middlesbrough
Davies 21'	Report	Job 2'; Zenden 7' (pen.)

Millennium Stadium, Cardiff
Attendance: 72,634
Referee: Mike Riley (West Yorkshire)

Bolton Wanderers	Middlesbrough

GK	22	(Finland) Jussi Jääskeläinen
RB	18	(England) Nicky Hunt		(substituted off) 87'
CB	5	(France) Bruno Ngotty
CB	26	(Brazil) Emerson Thome
LB	3	(England) Simon Charlton
RM	8	(Denmark) Per Frandsen	(yellow card) 23'	(substituted off) 63'
CM	16	(Spain) Iván Campo	(yellow card) 39'
CM	10	(Nigeria) Jay-Jay Okocha (c)
CM	4	(England) Kevin Nolan		(substituted off) 78'
LM	6	(France) Youri Djorkaeff
CF	14	(England) Kevin Davies
Substitutes:
GK	1	(England) Kevin Poole
DF	2	(England) Anthony Barness
MF	7	(Greece) Stelios Giannakopoulos		(substituted on) 87'
FW	9	(Denmark) Henrik Pedersen		(substituted on) 63'
FW	25	(Spain) Javi Moreno		(substituted on) 78'
Manager:
(England) Sam Allardyce

GK	1	(Australia) Mark Schwarzer
RB	15	(England) Danny Mills
CB	4	(England) Ugo Ehiogu
CB	6	(England) Gareth Southgate (c)
LB	3	(France) Franck Queudrue
RM	14	(Spain) Gaizka Mendieta
CM	7	(Netherlands) George Boateng	(yellow card) 23'
CM	20	(Brazil) Doriva
LM	27	(Netherlands) Boudewijn Zenden
AM	10	(Brazil) Juninho Paulista
CF	16	(Cameroon) Joseph-Désiré Job		(substituted off) 65'
Substitutes:
GK	35	(Australia) Brad Jones
DF	5	(England) Chris Riggott
MF	19	(England) Stewart Downing
FW	9	(Italy) Massimo Maccarone
FW	17	(England) Michael Ricketts	(yellow card) 90'	(substituted on) 65'
Manager:
(England) Steve McClaren

Man of the match

- Boudewijn Zenden (Middlesbrough)

Match rules

- 90 minutes
- 30 minutes of extra time if necessary
- Penalty shoot-out if scores still level
- Five named substitutes
- Maximum of three substitutions

== Post-match ==
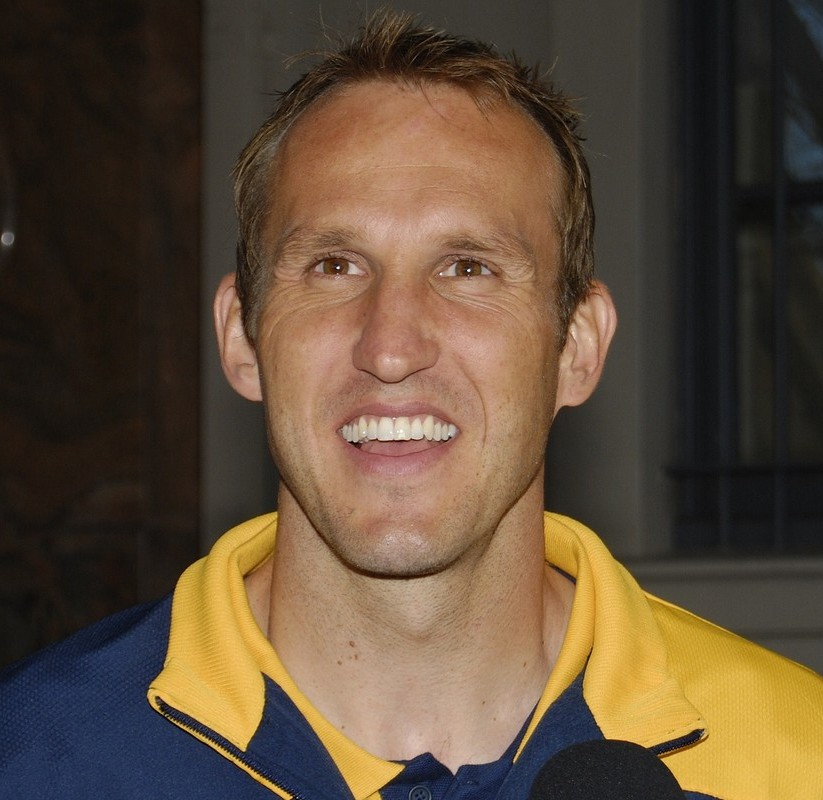
Middlesbrough goalkeeper Mark Schwarzer was praised by his manager for recovering from an error.

Winning manager McClaren called the victory a "great reward" for Middlesbrough's players, managers and chairman Steve Gibson. Captain Gareth Southgate also dedicated the win to the fans and Gibson, calling the chairman "the biggest fan we've got". Gibson himself called the win "128 years in the making" and predicted the team would "kick on" from it.

McClaren praised his goalkeeper Schwarzer for recovering from his error that allowed Bolton's goal, in order to make saves that won the match. He also said that the team should not become carried away by their qualification for Europe, and instead concentrate on the upcoming game against Birmingham City.

By winning the final, Middlesbrough qualified for the following season's UEFA Cup, their first European competition. They beat Baník Ostrava in the first round and came first in their group featuring Villarreal, Partizan, Lazio and Egaleo. They then defeated Grazer AK in the third round before being eliminated by Sporting.

Columnist Henry Winter The Daily Telegraph wrote that it was the best League Cup final since Luton Town beat Arsenal in 1988. He praised all four of Middlesbrough's back line for their "alert defending", and noted the hard work in midfield by Boateng that allowed Zenden, Juninho and Mendieta to create chances. He also lauded Bolton's fans and the efforts of Okocha, Djorkaeff and Davies, while noting how Bolton's Campo was effective despite "the odd pantomime dive". Alan Smith of the same newspaper opined that 33-year-old Southgate was the most deserving winner, as reward for his consistency since arriving in an "average" Boro side in 2001. Southgate's only other medal had come in the same competition for Aston Villa eight years prior.

In June 2013, Juninho said that winning the League Cup with Middlesbrough was better than when he won the FIFA World Cup with Brazil in 2002.
