= Doriva =

Brazilian footballer and manager (born 1972)

Personal information
- Full name: Dorival Guidoni Júnior
- Date of birth: 28 May 1972 (age 54)
- Place of birth: Mirassol, Brazil
- Height: 1.73 m (5 ft 8 in)
- Position: Midfielder

Senior career*
Years	Team	Apps	(Gls)
1991–1994	São Paulo	33	(0)
1992	→ Anapolina (loan)		
1993	→ Goiânia (loan)		
1995	XV de Piracicaba		
1995–1997	Atlético Mineiro	75	(1)
1997–1999	Porto	30	(5)
1999–2000	Sampdoria	54	(5)
2000–2003	Celta Vigo	34	(1)
2003	→ Middlesbrough (loan)	5	(0)
2003–2006	Middlesbrough	74	(0)
2007	América-SP		

International career
1995–1998	Brazil	12	(0)

Managerial career
- 2014: Ituano
- 2014: Atlético Paranaense
- 2015: Vasco da Gama
- 2015: Ponte Preta
- 2015: São Paulo
- 2016: Bahia
- 2016: Santa Cruz
- 2017: Atlético Goianiense
- 2018: Novorizontino
- 2018: Ponte Preta
- 2018: CRB
- 2019: Criciúma
- 2019: São Bento
- 2021–2022: Corinthians (assistant)
- 2023–: Albania (assistant)
- * Club domestic league appearances and goals

Dorival Guidoni Júnior (born 28 May 1972), known simply as Doriva, is a Brazilian football coach and retired footballer who played as a central midfielder.

From 2003 until 2006, he played for English Premier League club Middlesbrough, winning the 2004 League Cup and finishing as runner-up in the 2005–06 UEFA Cup. He retired due to a misdiagnosed heart condition while playing for Brazilian club América-SP in 2007.

Doriva played for the Brazil national football team between 1995 and 1998, making a brief substitute appearance in the 1998 FIFA World Cup in which Brazil finished as runners-up.

== Club career ==
=== Brazil ===
Doriva began his career at the youth of São Paulo, and after spending 1992 at Goiás teams Anapolina and Goiânia, was promoted to the main team under coach Telê Santana in 1993. That same year he won both the Libertadores da América and the Intercontinental Cup. In 1995, he was transferred to XV de Piracicaba after having his rights purchased by then-owner Rolim Amaro, founder of TAM Airlines.

Doriva came to Atlético Mineiro in 1995, as the team had just gotten a sponsorship deal with TAM. There Doriva had what he considered crucial years in his formation as a player, leading to a $4 million sale to Porto.

=== Porto, Sampdoria and Celta Vigo ===
Doriva's career in Porto had three Primeira Liga titles before he opted to transfer to Italy's Sampdoria, in an $8 million four-year contract. In 2000, he went to Spain, playing for Celta Vigo.

=== Middlesbrough ===
Doriva was signed by Middlesbrough manager Steve McClaren in January 2003, on loan until the end of the season. He made his debut on 5 April 2003 in a 3–0 home win over West Bromwich Albion.

After five appearances for the club, Doriva was given a one-year contract with Middlesbrough on 21 July 2003. In his first full season at the club, Doriva was first choice in midfield alongside George Boateng. He found his chances limited after this, however, due to the emergence of Stewart Downing and the conversion of Boudewijn Zenden to central midfield. On 11 February 2004, in a 3–2 win over Manchester United at Old Trafford, Doriva was pushed by Paul Scholes, who in April was given a three-match ban for the incident. On 29 February he started as Middlesbrough won their first major trophy, the 2004 Football League Cup Final, with a 2–1 win over Bolton Wanderers in the Millennium Stadium in Cardiff. His only goal for Middlesbrough came in a 2–1 victory at Notts County in the third round of the FA Cup on 8 January 2005.

In 2005, he earned a one-year contract extension, which Middlesbrough allowed to expire in July 2006.

=== América-SP ===
Following his release from Middlesbrough, he then signed for América-SP in Brazil, where he had a heart problem detected. Doriva's father and grandfather both died from heart conditions, and therefore he decided to retire from playing. Subsequent tests showed that the diagnosis was inaccurate and he could have continued playing, although he remained retired.

== Managerial career ==
After retiring in 2009, Doriva was hired by Ituano's president and former teammate Juninho; initially a manager of the youth team, he subsequently became an assistant manager and, in 2014, was appointed as coach. He led Ituano to a Cinderella run in the Campeonato Paulista, winning the title on penalty kicks over Santos.

Doriva was appointed Atlético Paranaense manager on 16 June 2014, but failed to impress, being sacked only two months later.

On 14 December 2014, Doriva was appointed as manager of Vasco da Gama. The following 4 August, after another state league title, he was named at the helm of Ponte Preta; on 7 October, however, he rescinded with the latter and moved to São Paulo. He lasted only a month with the team from the state capital, winning two and losing two league games, and being eliminated 3–1 on aggregate from the Copa do Brasil by rivals Santos.

Bahia signed Doriva for the year 2016. Despite a 69% winning rate with the Série B club, he was dismissed on 19 June after a first defeat of the season against Londrina. He then had two months in charge of Santa Cruz in the same season, resigning on 20 October as their relegation looked imminent.

In 2017, Doriva had ten games in charge of Atlético Goianiense before losing his job on 21 July; he recorded only one win and two draws. He was then appointed as Novorizontino's manager for the 2018 Campeonato Paulista. His team reached the quarter-finals before an 8–0 aggregate loss to Palmeiras.

In June 2018, Doriva was appointed coach of CRB. He left the club in September, to be replaced by Roberto Fernandes.

Doriva was hired by Criciúma of the Campeonato Catarinense at the start of 2019, and was fired on 5 March when the team were in 6th place. Two weeks later, he was appointed at São Bento, who were preparing for a season in the national second division. He was dismissed on 29 August, having won 5 of 19 games in the first half of the campaign.

On 23 May 2021, it was announced that Sylvinho would be Corinthians' new manager and Doriva would be his assistant.

== International career ==
Doriva's first cap for the Brazil national football team was in 1995. He was part of the Brazil squad which reached the final of the 1998 FIFA World Cup. He wore the number 17 shirt and made one appearance, in the second match of the group. He came on against Morocco in Nantes as a 68th-minute substitute for César Sampaio. He played a total of 12 games for the Brazilian squad.

== Honours ==
=== Player ===
==== Club ====
São Paulo

- Copa Libertadores: 1993
- Recopa Sul-Americana: 1993, 1994
- Supercopa Libertadores: 1993
- Intercontinental Cup: 1993

XV de Piracicaba

- Campeonato Brasileiro Série C: 1995

Atlético Mineiro

- Copa Conmebol: 1997

Porto

- Primeira Liga: 1997–98, 1998–99
- Taça de Portugal: 1997–98

Celta

- UEFA Intertoto Cup: 2000

Middlesbrough

- Football League Cup: 2003–04

==== International ====
Brazil

- FIFA Confederations Cup: 1997

=== Coach ===
Ituano

- Campeonato Paulista: 2014

Vasco da Gama

- Campeonato Carioca: 2015
