= George Boateng =

Dutch footballer (born 1975)

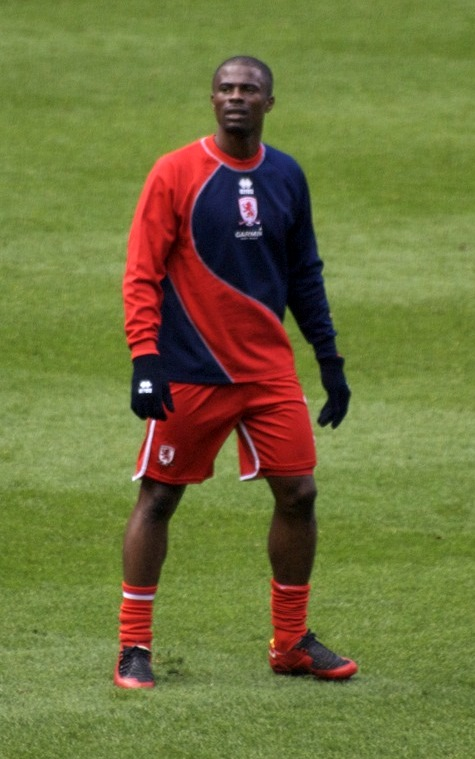
- Boateng playing for Middlesbrough in 2008

Personal information
- Full name: George Antwi Boateng
- Date of birth: 5 September 1975 (age 51)
- Place of birth: Nkawkaw, Ghana
- Height: 1.78 m (5 ft 10 in)
- Position: Defensive midfielder

Senior career*
Years	Team	Apps	(Gls)
1994–1995	Excelsior	9	(0)
1995–1997	Feyenoord	68	(1)
1997–1999	Coventry City	46	(5)
1999–2002	Aston Villa	103	(4)
2002–2008	Middlesbrough	182	(7)
2008–2010	Hull City	52	(1)
2010–2011	Skoda Xanthi	19	(2)
2011–2012	Nottingham Forest	5	(1)
2012–2013	T-Team	15	(2)
Total		499	(23)

International career
1995–1998	Netherlands U21	18	(0)
2001–2006	Netherlands	4	(0)

Managerial career
- 2014–2015: Kelantan
- 2025–2026: Mons
- * Club domestic league appearances and goals

George Antwi Boateng (born 5 September 1975) is a football manager and former player who was most recently head coach of Belgian club Mons.

A defensive midfielder, he made his breakthrough with Feyenoord in the Dutch Eredivisie, before spending most of his career in England, making 384 Premier League appearances and scoring 17 goals. He played for Coventry City, Aston Villa, Middlesbrough and Hull City, winning the Football League Cup with Middlesbrough in 2004.

Born in Ghana and raised in the Netherlands, Boateng made four appearances for the Netherlands national team.

== Club career ==
=== Feyenoord ===
Boateng was born in Nkawkaw, Ghana. He spent some of his childhood in the Ghanaian capital, Accra, where he played football barefoot despite having boots and rocky pitches. He was raised in the Netherlands from age 10 after his father remarried. At 16, he signed for Feyenoord, where he was a utility player, being used in all positions except goalkeeper, left winger and centre forward.

=== Coventry City ===
Boateng watched a 4–3 game between Liverpool and Newcastle United in April 1996, convincing him about English football's quality. With six months left of his Feyenoord contract and a four-year extension being offered, he completed a £250,000 move to Coventry City in December 1997. Manager Gordon Strachan signed him on a 3 1/2-year deal. He scored his first goal for the Sky Blues on 2 May 1998, in a 2–0 home win over Blackburn Rovers. On 27 February 1999, he and John Aloisi scored twice each in a 4–1 win away to fellow West Midlands club Aston Villa – his team's first ever league win at Villa Park.

=== Aston Villa ===
In July 1999, Boateng signed for Aston Villa for a £4.5 million fee. The club had previously bid £3 million after he had scored twice against them. Coventry chairman Bryan Richardson accused Villa manager John Gregory of making illegal approaches for Boateng. Gregory said that Richardson approached Villa to tell them they could buy Boateng for £5 million, opening up negotiations again.

Boateng played 131 matches for Villa, including the 2000 FA Cup final, which his team lost by a single goal to Chelsea. On 20 April 2002, away to Leicester City, opponent Paul Dickov's boot came off, and Boateng threw it into the crowd. He apologised for his actions and was warned by manager Graham Taylor. Boateng missed only one game in 2001–02, but immediately requested a transfer once the season ended.

=== Middlesbrough ===
In the summer of 2002, a potential move to Liverpool collapsed, while negotiations with Fulham slowed down. Boateng moved to Middlesbrough for £5 million. He said he was initially hesitant because he found Boro an easy team to play against. Still, he was convinced when Netherlands teammate Jaap Stam spoke highly of manager Steve McClaren, who had been assistant manager when Stam was at Manchester United.

In November 2002, Boateng avoided action from the Football Association on two occasions after clashing with Gianfranco Zola of Chelsea and Nick Barmby of Leeds United. He played in the 2004 Football League Cup final as Boro won the first major honour in their history. On 16 October 2004, he scored his first goal since September 2001 in a 4–0 win at Blackburn. In 2004–05, he missed 12 games through injury before returning to help the team to 7th place and UEFA Cup qualification. He played in the 2006 UEFA Cup final; his team lost 4–0 to Sevilla.

In June 2006, after negotiations of nearly a year, Boateng signed a new three-year contract. He was named captain the following month after Gareth Southgate retired and became manager. In the 2007–08 season, Southgate gave the captain's armband to Julio Arca in December and then Emmanuel Pogatetz in March, saying he wanted to move away from having one permanent captain.

=== Hull City ===
Newly promoted Premier League club Hull City announced on 10 July 2008 that Boateng had agreed to sign a two-year contract with them, for an undisclosed fee. After completing a medical, the move was completed on 16 July for an estimated fee of £1 million.

On 6 February 2010, Boateng scored his first goal for Hull City in a 2–1 win over Manchester City, their first win since November 2009.

Boateng's contract with Hull City ended following their relegation from the Premier League in 2010. He was runner-up to Stephen Hunt for the Player of the Year award.

=== Later career ===
After holding talks with Celtic, Boateng joined Greek side Skoda Xanthi on a two-year deal in July 2010.

On 27 July 2011, Boateng joined Nottingham Forest of the Football League Championship on a one-year deal. He reunited with former Middlesbrough manager McClaren, while former Dutch international and Middlesbrough teammate Jimmy Floyd Hasselbaink was first-team coach. He played 7 games in total for Forest, scoring an added-time equaliser in a 2–2 draw with East Midlands rivals Leicester City on 20 August.

On 15 November 2012, Boateng arrived in Malaysia to sign with T-Team. Four days later, he signed a one-year contract, linking him again with former Hull teammate and Republic of Ireland international Caleb Folan.

== International career ==
Born in Ghana and raised in the Netherlands, Boateng represented the Netherlands internationally, having not been approached by the Ghana Football Association. He was the captain of the under-21 team.

Boateng played four senior games for the Netherlands, each in a friendly match in a different year. He debuted on 10 November 2001 in a 1–1 draw away to Denmark, playing the full 90 minutes. On 12 November 2005, he ended 3 1/2 years without a cap by coming on as a substitute in a 3–1 home loss to Italy at the Amsterdam ArenA.

== Managerial career ==
=== Kelantan ===
In 2014, Boateng was unveiled as the new head coach of Kelantan, replacing Steve Darby, who had been shown the door after a 4–0 loss to Sime Darby On 6 May 2014, Kelantan came back from 3–0 down to draw 3–3 with Felda United in first leg of the Malaysia FA Cup semi-final in Boateng's first game as head coach. Boateng apologised to the Kelantan fans after Kelantan were knocked out of the Malaysia Cup by Kedah with 4–3 aggregate; reports were saying that he would step down from his role as Kelantan head coach the following season, but that proved to be wrong by Kelantan President, Annuar Musa. He was moved to the Technical Director position on 24 March 2015, and his position as head coach was taken by Mohd Azraai Khor Abdullah. Boateng left his post as technical director of Kelantan on 11 May 2015 to work as a coach or manager again.

=== Blackburn Rovers ===
On 5 September 2018, Boateng signed on as Under-13s head coach at Championship club Blackburn Rovers, where he coached different age groups at the academy.

=== Aston Villa ===
On 29 July 2019, it was announced that Boateng had left Rovers to take up a position as Aston Villa Under-18 Professional Development Coach.

In September 2020, Boateng was promoted to become the Professional Development Coach of the under 23 squad at Aston Villa.

On 26 August 2022, Boateng announced that he would be leaving his role at Aston Villa to focus on his role with the Ghana national team in the build-up to the 2022 FIFA World Cup that winter.

=== Ghana national team ===
In May 2022, the Ghana Football Association announced that Boateng would be the new assistant coach of the Ghana national team.

=== Coventry City ===
On 1 July 2024, Boateng returned to another of his former clubs, being appointed first-team coach at Coventry City.

On 28 November 2024, Boateng departed the club following the appointment of Frank Lampard as manager.

=== Mons ===
On 18 August 2025, Boateng became the head coach of Belgian third tier side Mons, having agreed a three-year contract. On 8 October 2026, the club announced that it had ended its collaboration with Boateng, stating that results had not met its expectations and ambitions.

== Personal life ==
Boateng is a Christian who says his faith affects how he conducts himself. In an interview with Church Times, he stated: "My family and I have become very devoted Christians. Hearing and acting on the Word is very important."

George is not related to Jerome and Kevin Prince Boateng.

== Career statistics ==
=== Club ===
Appearances and goals by club, season and competition
Club	Season	League			National cup (Note: Includes KNVB Cup, FA Cup, Malaysia FA Cup)		League cup (Note: Includes Football League Cup)		Continental		Total	
Club	Season	Division	Apps	Goals	Apps	Goals	Apps	Goals	Apps	Goals	Apps	Goals
Excelsior	1994–95	Eerste Divisie	9	0	0	0	–		–		9	0
Feyenoord	1995–96	Eredivisie	24	1	0	0	–		–		24	1
Feyenoord	1996–97	Eredivisie	26	0	0	0	–		–		26	0
Feyenoord	1997–98	Eredivisie	18	0	0	0	–		2 (Note: Appearances in UEFA Champions League)	0	20	0
Feyenoord	Total		68	1	0	0	–		2	0	70	1
Coventry City	1997–98	Premier League	14	1	5	0	–		–		19	1
Coventry City	1998–99	Premier League	32	4	3	1	3	1	–		38	6
Coventry City	Total		46	5	8	1	3	1	–		57	7
Aston Villa	1999–2000	Premier League	33	2	5	0	7	1	–		45	3
Aston Villa	2000–01	Premier League	33	1	3	0	1	0	4 (Note: Appearance(s) in UEFA Intertoto Cup)	0	41	1
Aston Villa	2001–02	Premier League	37	1	1	0	2	0	8 (Note: Six appearances in UEFA Intertoto Cup, two appearances in UEFA Cup)	0	48	1
Aston Villa	2002–03	Premier League	0	0	0	0	0	0	1	0	1	0
Aston Villa	Total		103	4	9	0	10	1	13	0	135	5
Middlesbrough	2002–03	Premier League	28	0	0	0	0	0	–		28	0
Middlesbrough	2003–04	Premier League	35	0	2	0	6	0	–		43	0
Middlesbrough	2004–05	Premier League	25	3	0	0	0	0	4 (Note: Appearances in UEFA Cup)	0	29	3
Middlesbrough	2005–06	Premier League	26	2	4	0	2	0	12	1	44	3
Middlesbrough	2006–07	Premier League	35	1	6	1	0	0	–		41	2
Middlesbrough	2007–08	Premier League	33	1	3	0	2	0	–		38	1
Middlesbrough	Total		182	7	15	1	10	0	16	1	223	9
Hull City	2008–09	Premier League	23	0	2	0	0	0	–		25	0
Hull City	2009–10	Premier League	29	1	1	0	1	0	–		31	1
Hull City	Total		52	1	3	0	1	0	–		56	1
Skoda Xanthi	2010–11	Super League Greece	19	2	0	0	–		–		19	2
Nottingham Forest	2011–12	Championship	5	1	1	0	1	0	–		7	1
T-Team	2012–13	Malaysia Super League	15	2	5	2	0	0	–		20	4
Career total			499	23	41	4	25	1	31	1	596	29

== Coaching statistics ==
As of 24 March 2015

Team	Nat	From	To	Record				
Team	Nat	From	To	G	W	D	L	Win %
Kelantan	Malaysia	25 April 2014	24 March 2015	37	18	2	17	48.65

== Honours ==
Aston Villa

- UEFA Intertoto Cup: 2001
- FA Cup runner-up: 1999–2000

Middlesbrough

- Football League Cup: 2003–04
- UEFA Cup runner-up: 2005–06
