= Brad Jones (soccer) =

Australian soccer player (born 1982)

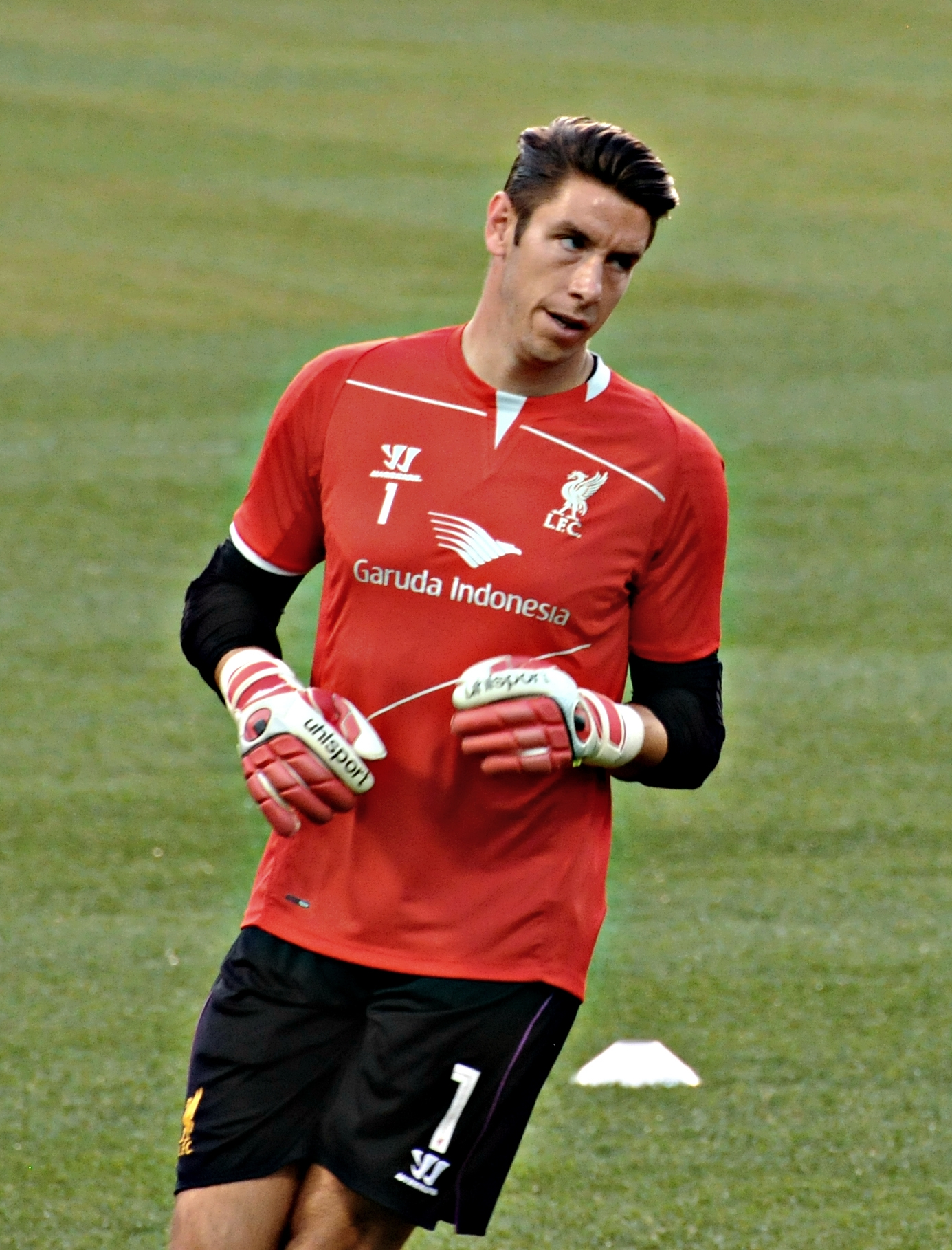
- Jones warming up for Liverpool in 2014

Personal information
- Full name: Bradley Scott Jones
- Date of birth: 19 March 1982 (age 44)
- Place of birth: Mount Nasura, Australia
- Height: 1.94 m (6 ft 4 in)
- Position: Goalkeeper

Youth career
- 1997–1999: Bayswater City
- 1999–2001: Middlesbrough

Senior career*
Years	Team	Apps	(Gls)
2001–2010	Middlesbrough	57	(0)
2001	→ Shelbourne (loan)	4	(0)
2002–2003	→ Stockport County (loan)	1	(0)
2003	→ Rotherham United (loan)	0	(0)
2003	→ Blackpool (loan)	5	(0)
2004–2005	→ Blackpool (loan)	12	(0)
2006	→ Sheffield Wednesday (loan)	15	(0)
2010–2015	Liverpool	11	(0)
2011	→ Derby County (loan)	7	(0)
2015–2016	Bradford City	3	(0)
2016	NEC	17	(0)
2016–2018	Feyenoord	63	(0)
2018–2021	Al-Nassr	78	(0)
2021–2023	Perth Glory	5	(0)
Total		278	(0)

International career
2001	Australia U20	1	(0)
2003–2004	Australia U23	6	(0)
2007–2018	Australia	6	(0)
Medal record
Representing Australia
Men's Association football
OFC Nations Cup
Winner	2004 Australia
- * Club domestic league appearances and goals

Bradley Scott Jones (born 19 March 1982) is an Australian former professional soccer player who played as a goalkeeper.

He was a member of the Middlesbrough team for over a decade often playing on loan at a succession of lower league English clubs: Stockport County, Rotherham United, Blackpool and Sheffield Wednesday. He also had a brief loan spell in Ireland with Shelbourne. In 2010, he made a £2.3 million move to Liverpool where he spent four seasons, mostly in a back-up role. Jones then had two short stints, his final in England at Bradford City and then in the Netherlands at NEC, before joining Feyenoord on a one-year deal in August 2016. In May 2017, he signed for another two years at Feyenoord following their title win in the Dutch Eredivisie. He then joined Saudi club Al-Nassr in 2018, going on to play for the latter across three seasons before departing in the summer of 2021 and returning to his hometown and joining Perth Glory, and later retired in 2023.

== Club career ==
=== Early career ===
Jones was born in Mount Nasura, a suburb of Perth, Western Australia, to English parents. A childhood Liverpool fan, he attended John Curtin Senior High School, graduating in 1998. Jones signed for Bayswater City SC in Western Australia.

=== Middlesbrough ===
He was then signed by Middlesbrough, playing in their youth system, and signed a professional contract on 26 March 1999. He made his first team debut in the FA Cup third round against Notts County in 2004 and later that season won a League Cup winners medal.

He had loan spells at several clubs; in the 2001–02 season he played four games for Irish club side Shelbourne. He made his professional and League of Ireland debut on 5 October against local rivals Bohemians at Dalymount Park and conceded 4 goals in a 6–4 victory one of which was direct from his own goal kick. His second appearance for the club came one week later in a 3–1 home victory against Monaghan United. Later he had loan spells at Stockport County and Blackpool. In the 2005–06 season, playing for Middlesbrough, Jones saved a Ruud van Nistelrooy penalty which left the match against Manchester United level at 0–0.

In August 2006, Jones was loaned out to Sheffield Wednesday for three months. He made an up-and-down start to his loan spell, making some vital saves as well as conceding penalties in successive games against Plymouth Argyle and Leeds United. On 21 October, his own fans turned on him and attacked him by throwing coins and other missiles during the home game against Queens Park Rangers.

With mentor Mark Schwarzer moving to Fulham, Jones became first choice goalkeeper at Middlesbrough. He picked up an injury in the second game of the 2008–09 season and subsequently missed the next two games. Jones regained his place in the Middlesbrough first team in January 2009 and remained first choice as Middlesbrough were relegated from the Premier League. Another pre-season injury saw him miss the start of the season but he regained his place after new signing Danny Coyne conceded five goals against West Bromwich Albion. He remained in the Boro side for the rest of the season, although they failed to gain promotion from the Championship.

=== Liverpool ===
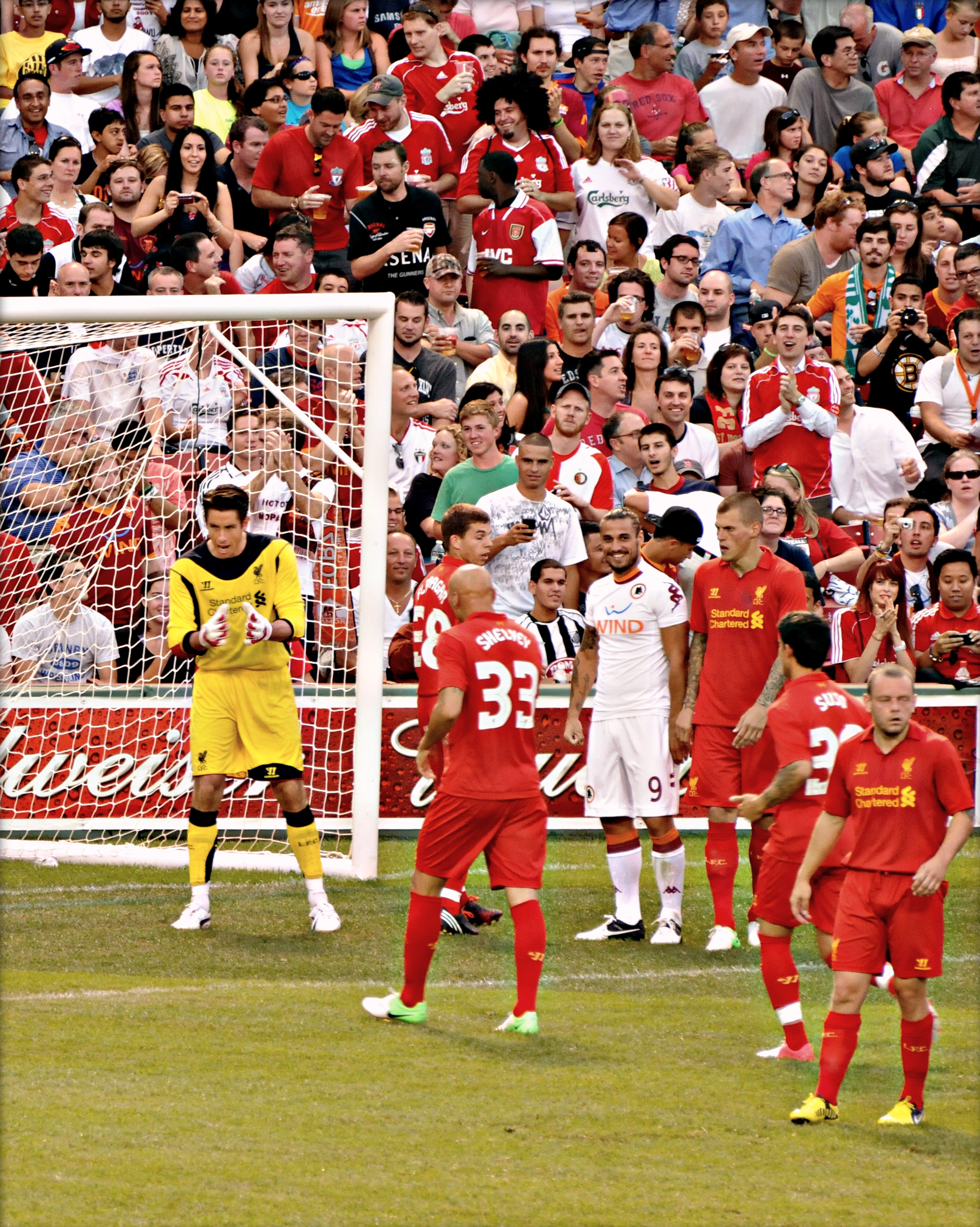
Jones playing for Liverpool in a 2012 summer friendly

On 17 August 2010, Jones joined Liverpool in a deal worth £2,300,000. He qualified as a "home-grown" player under the new Premier League rules. On 19 August, Jones watched Liverpool's UEFA Europa League play-off 1st leg tie at Anfield from the directors' box, along with captain Steven Gerrard, Emiliano Insúa, Alberto Aquilani and Dirk Kuyt. He was handed the number 1 shirt after goalkeeper Diego Cavalieri left the club on 23 August, ahead of Liverpool's clash with Manchester City. Jones made his unofficial debut in Jamie Carragher's testimonial against an Everton XI and impressed with a string of saves. Jones made his debut for Liverpool in the League Cup 3rd Round tie against Northampton Town on 23 September 2010. The game ended 2–2 after extra time before Liverpool lost on penalties. A couple of weeks later, Jones injured his shoulder in training and was out for up to a month. Reserve goalkeeper Martin Hansen took his place on the bench until Jones was back fit, as Liverpool's other backup goalkeeper Péter Gulácsi was on loan at nearby club Tranmere Rovers. He made his second start for the club on 15 December 2010, in a Europa League game against Utrecht, getting his first clean sheet for the Reds. Unfortunately for Jones, this was to be his last game of the 2010–11 season.

==== Derby County (loan) ====
At the end of March, Jones joined Derby County on loan for the remainder of the 2010–11 season. Jones made his debut in a 4–1 loss to Cardiff City, and went on to concede 16 goals in his seven games at Derby, including another four against Burnley (2–4) and three against Norwich City (2–3). He came in for criticism from Derby manager Nigel Clough after his mistake let Bristol City take an early lead in Derby's final home game of the season, in a match the club eventually lost 2–0. It turned out to be Jones' last Derby game. He was an unused substitute in Derby's 2–1 defeat at Reading on the last day of the Championship season before returning to Liverpool, after being replaced by academy goalkeeper Ross Atkins.

==== Return to Liverpool ====
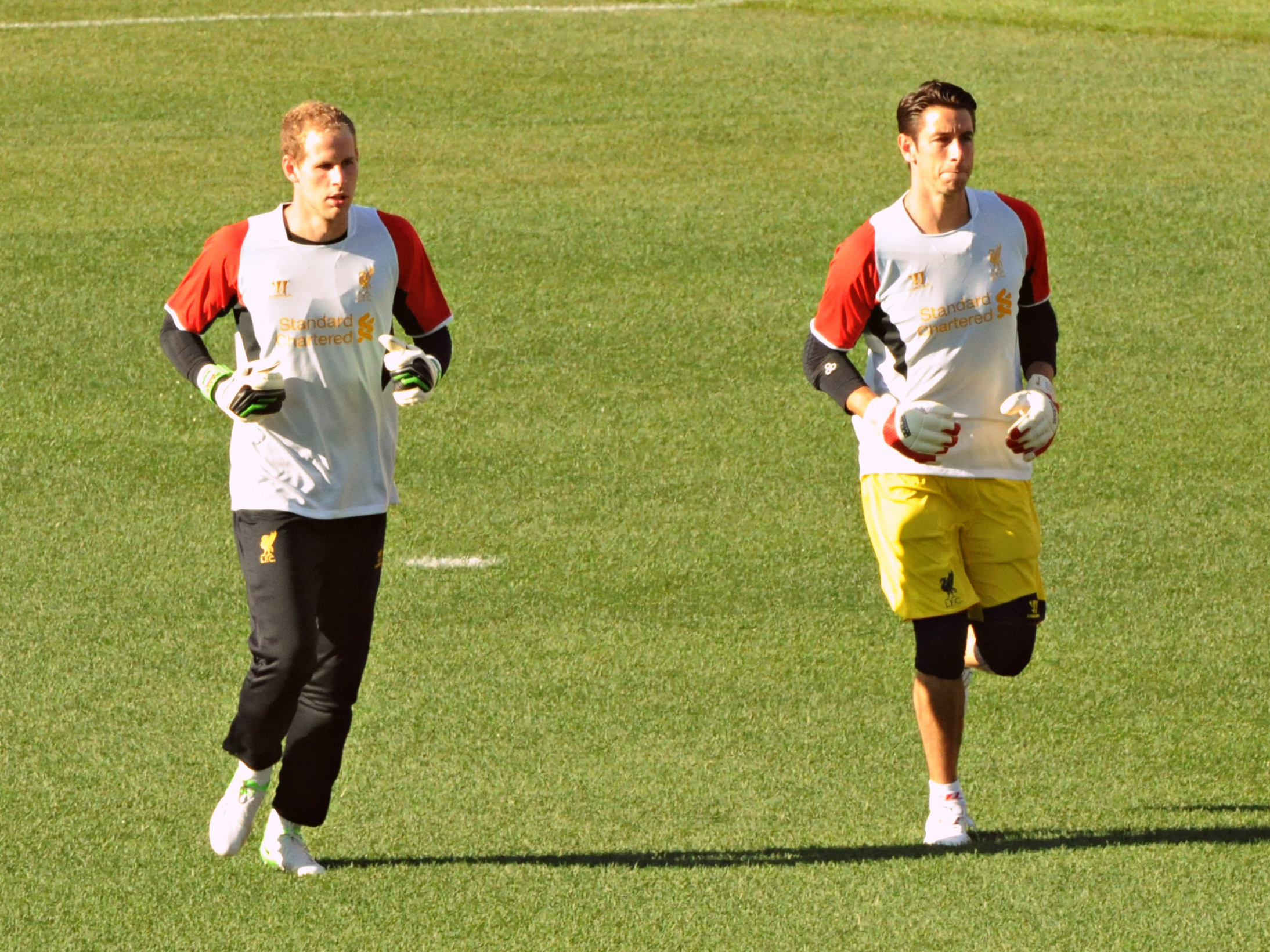
Jones and teammate Péter Gulácsi training with Liverpool in 2012

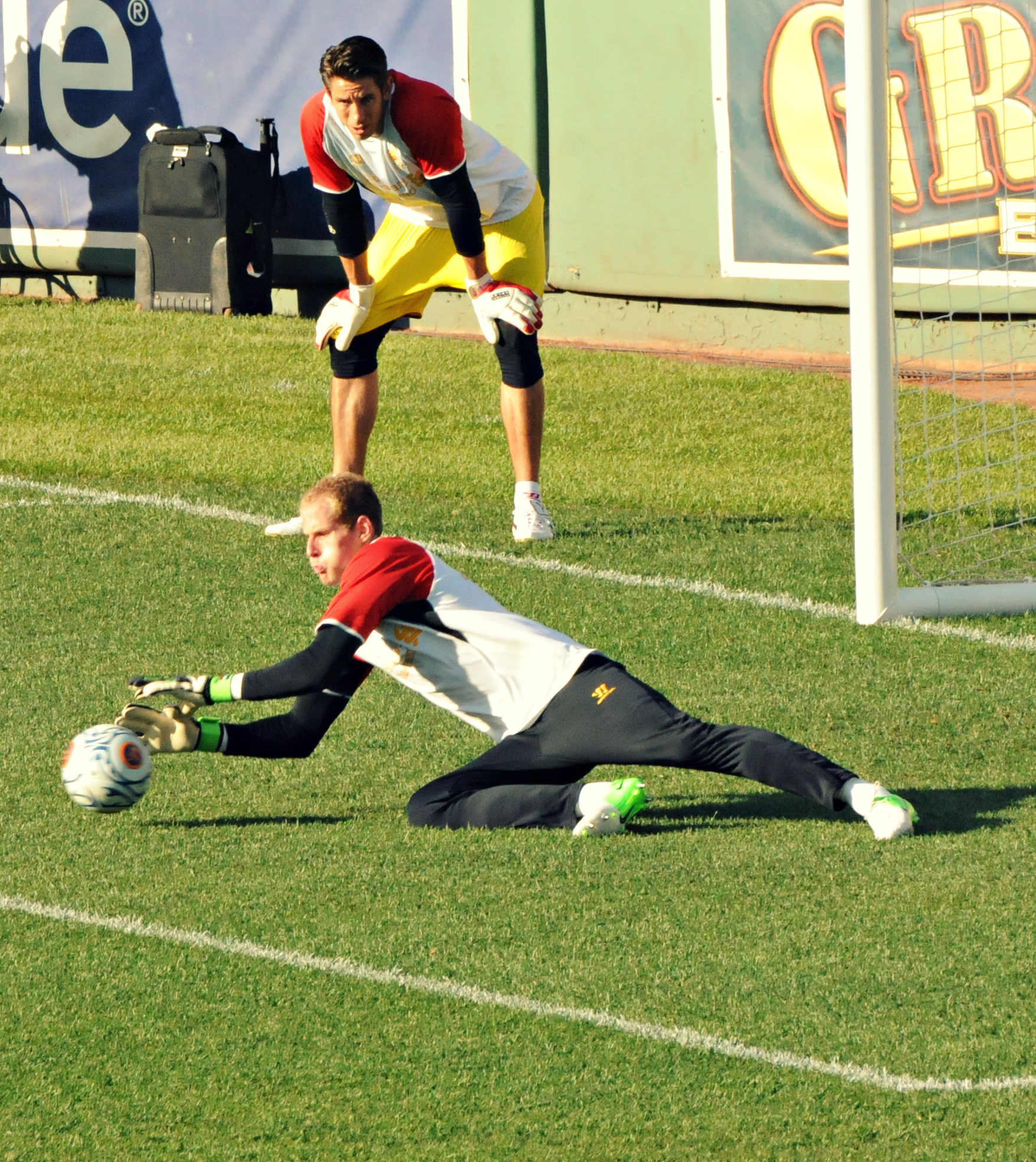
Jones watching Gulácsi in training in 2012

His first Premier League match for Liverpool came on 10 April 2012, in a 3–2 away win against Blackburn Rovers. Jones came off the bench in the 26th minute after second choice goalkeeper Doni had been sent off for fouling Junior Hoilett in the penalty area. Jones saved the resulting penalty, taken by Yakubu and celebrated by pointing towards the sky in dedication to his late son, Luca. Liverpool went on to win the game 2–3 with an injury time winner from Andy Carroll. He played in the FA Cup semi-final against Everton at Wembley, due to the suspension of Doni and first choice goalkeeper Pepe Reina; Liverpool went on to win the game 2–1 thanks to goals from Luis Suárez and Andy Carroll. Jones therefore made history as the first Liverpool player to make his first four appearances for the club in four different competitions.

Jones made his first appearance of the 2012–13 season in a UEFA Europa League qualifier against Gomel on 2 August; Liverpool won the game 1–0. His second appearance came on 20 September in a 5–2 win against Young Boys in the Europa League group stage. Jones also helped Liverpool progress in the League Cup in a 2–1 win against West Brom on 26 September.

His first Premier League start came on 20 October, against Reading, which Liverpool won 1–0. On 25 October, Jones played his third Europa League game against Anzhi Makhachkala, keeping yet another clean sheet as Liverpool won 1–0. Three days later he played in Liverpool's 2–2 draw at Goodison Park. On 31 October, Liverpool played Swansea City in the League Cup which Liverpool lost 3–1.

Jones continued to start in goal for Liverpool after their 1–1 draw with Newcastle United on 4 November. Liverpool played against Anzhi on 8 November in a Europa League group stage match and lost 1–0 after a 46th minute chip goal from Lacina Traore. November seemed to be Jones' month after another start on 11 November against Chelsea at Stamford Bridge. The game ended in a 1–1 draw thanks to Jones making a good save from a Fernando Torres header.

Due to his excellent performances Jones was rewarded and signed a new contract with Liverpool on 21 December 2012. Jones would then go on to keep another clean sheet this time in a 5–0 win over Norwich in the Premier League. He would then play in an FA Cup match v League one side Oldham, Jones was at fault for at least one of the goals conceded as Liverpool crashed out 3–2. He would then go on to play two more times in the 2012/2013 season, The first was a 3–1 defeat against Southampton, Jones also made a string of good saves in that game including a one on one v Rickie Lambert, His other game was a 3–2 victory over Tottenham making a string of good saves in particular a free kick from Gareth Bale.

Overall, Jones played 15 times in the 2012–13 season conceding 21 goals and keeping four clean sheets in his most productive season yet for Liverpool. During the 2013–14 season, Brad Jones did not make any appearance for Liverpool in the Premier League. But he was the number-one goalkeeper for the FA Cup and played two games before losing to Arsenal in the fifth round.

On 14 December 2014, Jones was chosen in the starting 11 against Manchester United instead of the regular goalkeeper Simon Mignolet, who had been under-performing since the start of the season. Jones put in a mixed performance in a 3–0 loss, with some analysts criticising him for going to ground too early for two of the goals.

On 10 June 2015, Jones was released by Liverpool, ending his five-year tenure with the club.

=== Bradford City ===
On 17 August 2015, Jones signed for Bradford City on a one-year deal following his release from Liverpool. Jones played his first game for Bradford in a 2–2 draw with Sheffield United. On 27 October 2015, Bradford City confirmed that Jones had departed the club by mutual consent.

=== NEC ===
On 5 January 2016 Jones joined Dutch club NEC on a 6-month deal.

After a strong season with 17 appearances for the club and 4 clean sheets, despite NEC wanting to retain Jones, on 3 June 2016 he left the club in favour of other offers.

=== Feyenoord ===
On 7 July 2016, Jones moved to the Netherlands and joined top-tier Eredivisie side Feyenoord on a one-year deal. He made his debut on 7 August 2016, keeping a clean-sheet in Feyenoord's 5–0 win over FC Groningen. In February 2017, Jones kept his 14th clean sheet of the season, in the process becoming the first Feyenoord goalkeeper to achieve the milestone since Ed de Goey twenty years earlier. Despite the return of regular goalkeeper Kenneth Vermeer, Jones' good form saw him retain the starting position for the remainder of the 2016–17 season. Feyenoord went on to win the 2016–17 Eredivisie, with Jones keeping 17 clean sheets in the club's first title in 18 years. On 22 May 2017, Feyenoord announced that Jones had signed a new contract, signing on for two additional years at the Rotterdam-based club.

On 22 April 2018, Jones started as goalkeeper as Feyenoord won the 2017–18 KNVB Cup final 3–0 against AZ Alkmaar.

=== Al-Nassr ===
On 1 August 2018, Jones joined Saudi Professional League side Al-Nassr on an initial two-year deal. He was a part of the side that won the Saudi Pro League title in 2019. On 1 July 2021, it was announced that Jones had left Al-Nassr when his contract with the side expired. During his time with Al-Nassr, he made 78 total league appearances as goalkeeper across three seasons.

=== Return to Australia ===
On 5 August 2021, it was announced that Jones would return to Australia and his native city of Perth, signing for local side Perth Glory on a two-year contract.

On 24 May 2023, Jones officially announced his retirement from football, ending a 22-year long career with a total of 367 appearances made as goalkeeper.

== International career ==
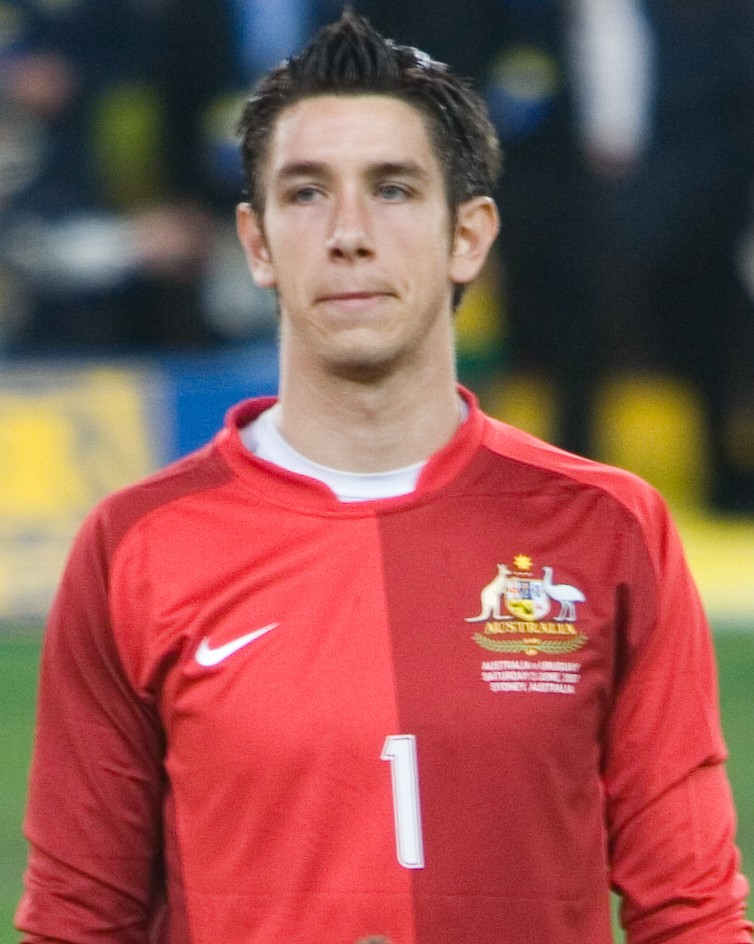
Jones lining up for Australia in 2007

Having played for the Australia national under-20 football team and the under-23 side at the 2004 Summer Olympics, Jones felt disappointed to be overlooked for the 2006 FIFA World Cup squad and considered switching his international allegiance to England or France, the latter being possible as his wife was French. The following year, Jones received his first senior international call up for Australia on 5 February 2007 to replace Mark Schwarzer in a friendly match.

He made his first senior international start on 2 June 2007 against Uruguay. He was at fault for Australia losing that match after dropping a routine catch allowing Alvaro Recoba to score an easy goal. He was part of Australia's début campaign in the 2007 AFC Asian Cup, but he did not feature in any of their matches. Additionally, he was selected as one of the three goalkeepers in Australia's final 23-man squad for the 2010 FIFA World Cup, but he left the squad to return to his family following news of his son being diagnosed with leukemia and he did not return to the tournament.

While Ange Postecoglou was coaching Australia, Jones made only one appearance, playing half of a friendly match against Ecuador which Australia lost 3–4. Jones wasn't called-up after that by Postecoglou, despite being in form during three seasons playing in the Eredivisie, surprising many including goalkeeper Mark Schwarzer. After Postecoglou's quitting, his replacement, Bert van Marwijk, has revealed to be interested in calling-up Jones back to the national squad. In May 2018, he was named in Australia's preliminary 26 man squad for the 2018 World Cup in Russia. He was then named to the 23-man squad on 2 June. Jones would go on to appear in all of Australia's matches as an unused substitute, as compatriot Maty Ryan would be selected as first-choice goalkeeper for the tournament.

== Personal life ==
Jones' six-year-old son, Luca, from a previous relationship, died on 18 November 2011 after a year-long battle with leukaemia. Liverpool's players and staff wore black armbands as a mark of respect in their subsequent 2–1 victory over Chelsea; his old teammates at Middlesbrough also wore armbands as a mark of respect. He has three children, two sons born in 2012 and 2019, and a daughter born in 2014.

Post-retirement, Jones has been working with former club Perth Glory as a goalkeeping coach for the women's team.

== Career statistics ==
=== Club ===
Appearances and goals by club, season and competition
Club	Season	League			National cup		League cup		Continental		Other		Total	
Club	Season	Division	Apps	Goals	Apps	Goals	Apps	Goals	Apps	Goals	Apps	Goals	Apps	Goals
Middlesbrough	2002–03	Premier League	0	0	0	0	0	0	—		—		0	0
Middlesbrough	2003–04	Premier League	1	0	1	0	0	0	—		—		2	0
Middlesbrough	2004–05	Premier League	5	0	0	0	0	0	0	0	—		5	0
Middlesbrough	2005–06	Premier League	9	0	3	0	0	0	4 (Note: Appearances in UEFA Cup)	0	—		16	0
Middlesbrough	2006–07	Premier League	2	0	1	0	0	0	—		—		3	0
Middlesbrough	2007–08	Premier League	1	0	0	0	2	0	—		—		3	0
Middlesbrough	2008–09	Premier League	16	0	5	0	1	0	—		—		22	0
Middlesbrough	2009–10	Championship	23	0	0	0	0	0	—		—		23	0
Middlesbrough	Total		57	0	10	0	3	0	4	0	—		74	0
Shelbourne (loan)	2001–02	LOI Premier Division	4	0	0	0	0	0	0	0	—		4	0
Stockport County (loan)	2002–03	Second Division	1	0	0	0	0	0	—		0	0	1	0
Rotherham United (loan)	2003–04	First Division	0	0	0	0	0	0	—		0	0	0	0
Blackpool (loan)	2003–04	Second Division	5	0	0	0	0	0	—		2 (Note: Appearances in Football League Trophy)	0	7	0
Blackpool (loan)	2004–05	League One	12	0	0	0	0	0	—		0	0	12	0
Sheffield Wednesday (loan)	2006–07	Championship	15	0	0	0	0	0	—		—		15	0
Liverpool	2010–11	Premier League	0	0	0	0	1	0	1 (Note: Appearances in UEFA Europa League)	0	—		2	0
Liverpool	2011–12	Premier League	1	0	1	0	0	0	—		—		2	0
Liverpool	2012–13	Premier League	7	0	2	0	2	0	4	0	—		15	0
Liverpool	2013–14	Premier League	0	0	3	0	0	0	—		—		3	0
Liverpool	2014–15	Premier League	3	0	0	0	2	0	0	0	—		5	0
Liverpool	Total		11	0	6	0	5	0	5	0	—		27	0
Derby County (loan)	2010–11	Championship	7	0	0	0	0	0	—		—		7	0
Bradford City	2015–16	League One	3	0	0	0	0	0	—		0	0	3	0
NEC	2015–16	Eredivisie	17	0	0	0	—		—		—		17	0
Feyenoord	2016–17	Eredivisie	32	0	4	0	—		6	0	—		42	0
Feyenoord	2017–18	Eredivisie	31	0	5	0	—		5 (Note: Appearances in UEFA Champions League)	0	1 (Note: Appearance in Johan Cruyff Shield)	0	42	0
Feyenoord	Total		63	0	9	0	—		11	0	1	0	84	0
Al-Nassr	2018–19	Saudi Professional League	25	0	4	0	—		8 (Note: Appearances in AFC Champions League)	0	2 (Note: Appearance in Arab Club Champions Cup)	0	39	0
Al-Nassr	2019–20	Saudi Professional League	29	0	4	0	—		8	0	1 (Note: Appearance in Saudi Super Cup)	0	42	0
Al-Nassr	2020–21	Saudi Professional League	24	0	3	0	—		2	0	1	0	30	0
Al-Nassr	Total		78	0	11	0	—		18	0	4	0	111	0
Perth Glory	2021–22	A-League Men	5	0	0	0	—		—		—		5	0
Perth Glory	2022–23	A-League Men	0	0	0	0	—		—		—		0	0
Perth Glory	Total		5	0	0	0	—		—		—		5	0
Career total			278	0	36	0	8	0	38	0	7	0	367	0

=== International ===
As of 8 November 2018

Australia
Year	Apps	Goals
2007	1	0
2010	1	0
2011	1	0
2014	1	0
2018	2	0
Total	6	0

== Honours ==
Middlesbrough

- Football League Cup: 2003–04
- UEFA Cup runner-up: 2005–06

Blackpool

- Football League Trophy: 2003–04

Feyenoord

- Eredivisie: 2016–17
- KNVB Cup: 2017–18
- Johan Cruyff Shield: 2017

Al-Nassr

- Saudi Pro League: 2018–19
- Saudi Super Cup: 2019, 2020

Australia

- OFC Nations Cup: 2004
