= Joseph-Désiré Job =

Cameroon international footballer (born 1977)

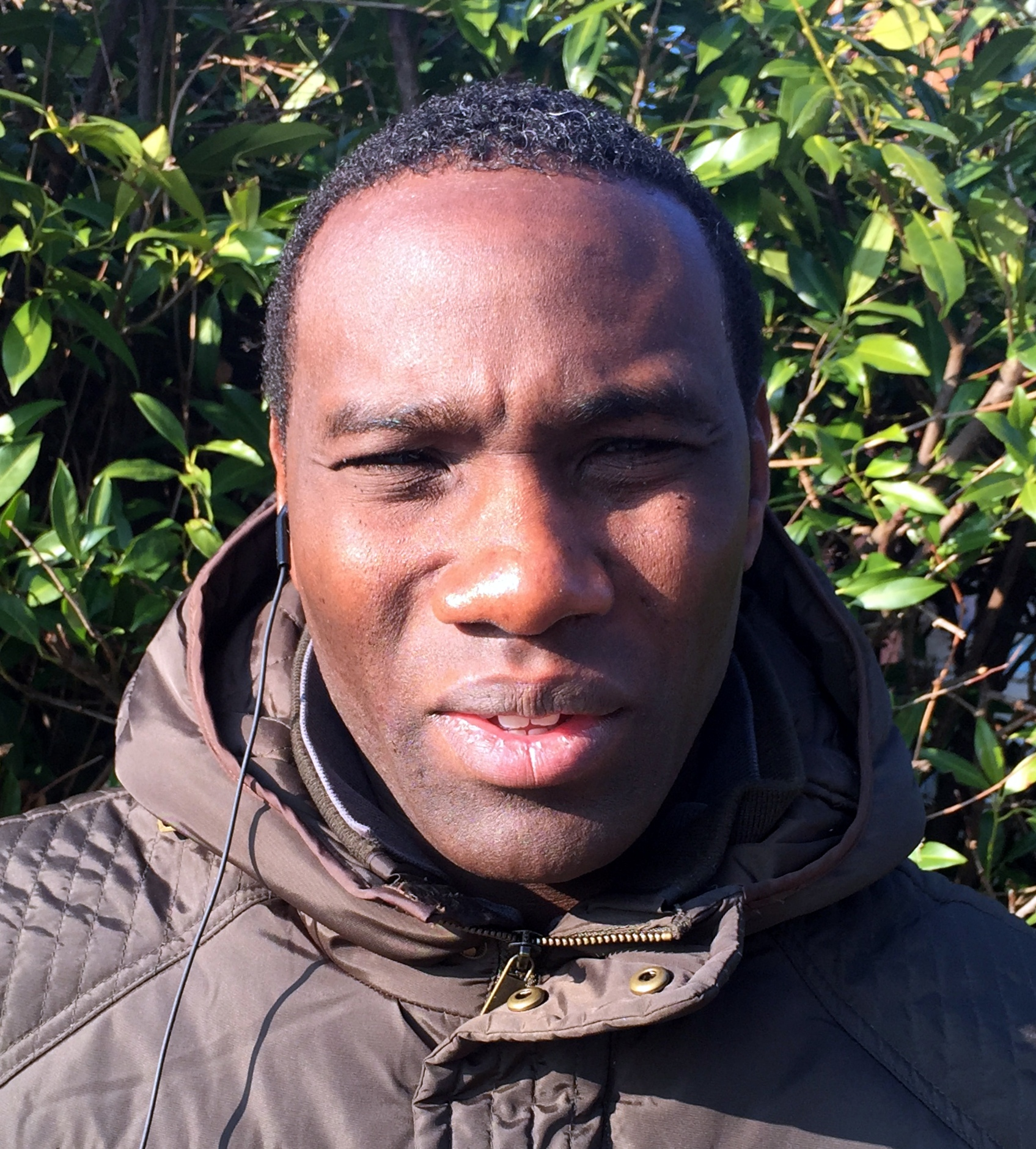
- Job in 2015

Personal information
- Date of birth: 1 December 1977 (age 48)
- Place of birth: Vénissieux, France
- Height: 1.80 m (5 ft 11 in)
- Position: Forward

Youth career
- 1992–1993: Vénissieux
- 1993–1996: Lyon

Senior career*
Years	Team	Apps	(Gls)
1996–1999	Lyon	41	(11)
1999–2000	Lens	24	(4)
2000–2006	Middlesbrough	94	(19)
2002	→ Metz (loan)	13	(2)
2005–2006	→ Al-Ittihad (loan)	28	(9)
2006–2007	Sedan	28	(10)
2007–2008	Nice	12	(3)
2008–2009	Al-Kharitiyath	23	(10)
2009	Diyarbakırspor	8	(0)
2010–2011	Lierse	10	(3)
Total		281	(71)

International career
1997–2008	Cameroon	51	(9)
Medal record
Men's football
Representing Cameroon
Africa Cup of Nations
Winner	2000 Ghana-Nigeria
Runner-up	2008 Ghana
FIFA Confederations Cup
Runner-up	2003 France
- * Club domestic league appearances and goals

Joseph-Désiré Job (born 1 December 1977) is a former professional footballer who played as a forward. Born in France, he played for the Cameroon national team.

After starting his career in France, Job moved to English team Middlesbrough, where he spent six years and is most remembered for scoring one of the two goals in the 2004 League Cup Final, where Middlesbrough won their first ever trophy.

He also played for clubs in Saudi Arabia, Qatar, Turkey and Belgium. While playing for Saudi club Al-Ittihad, he won the 2005 AFC Champions League and scored in the final.

== Club career ==
=== Lyon ===
Job was born in the French city of Lyon and began training with the Olympique Lyonnais youth academy at the age of ten. He made his debut for the club in the Intertoto Cup when he was nineteen years old in 1997, scoring a hat-trick as the club beat Polish club Odra Wodzisław 5–2.

=== Lens ===
Job joined RC Lens on 1 August 1999.

He scored a number of goals for Lens in the 1999–2000 UEFA Cup as they reached the semi-final stage.

=== Middlesbrough ===
Middlesbrough's then manager Bryan Robson signed Job in 2000 for £3 million, where he scored 19 goals in 94 appearances for the club. He also scored 20 minutes into his debut against Coventry City. After struggling to hold down a regular place in the team, he was sent on loan to French Ligue 1 club FC Metz in December 2001, until the end of the season.

On 30 November 2002, Job cracked his skull in a clash of heads with West Bromwich Albion player Darren Moore and was knocked unconscious on the pitch. On 29 September 2003, Job twisted his knee in training and was expected to be out of action for four months, just after scoring the clubs winning goal against Everton with then Middlesbrough manager, Steve McClaren saying, "It's a huge blow for Joseph because he has been playing well lately and he also got our winner against Everton. We'll miss him. The highlight of his career at Middlesbrough came in the 2004 Football League Cup Final on 29 February 2004 when he scored a second minute goal to help the club to win their first ever major trophy, in a 2–1 win over Bolton Wanderers at the Millennium Stadium, Cardiff, a result which also saw the club qualify for the UEFA Cup.

On 15 December 2004, Job scored Middlesbrough's second goal in a 3–0 UEFA Cup Group E win over Serbian club FK Partizan at the Riverside Stadium as they qualified, as winners of the group, for the knockout stages. Middlesbrough went out of the competition in the Round of 32 to Portuguese club, Sporting CP, with Job again scoring in the home leg on 10 March 2005. During his time at Middlesbrough he was the subject of one of the more memorable fan chants, being serenaded by the words "there's only one Job on Teesside!", due to a lot of unemployment in the area at the time.

In the 2005–06 season, he was again sent on loan, this time to Saudi Arabia on 31 August 2005, where he played for Al-Ittihad on a season-long loan. He helped the club win the AFC Champions League in 2005, scoring in the second leg of the final against United Arab Emirates club, Al Ain FC on 5 November 2005 in Jeddah. Job's struggle to win a first-team place became even more difficult, following the signings of established Premiership strikers Mark Viduka, Jimmy Floyd Hasselbaink and Yakubu. His contract with Middlesbrough expired after his loan spell with Al-Ittihad. He spent part of the 2006–07 pre-season training with Watford, but was not offered a contract.

=== Sedan ===
Job joined Ligue 1 club CS Sedan on 19 September 2006 on a one-year contract. He capped 28 times and scored 10 goals.

=== Nice ===
Job moved to Ligue 1 club OGC Nice in summer 2007, signing a two-year contract.

In summer 2008, he was linked with a move to English Football League Championship club Blackpool.

=== Lierse ===
On 15 March 2010, Lierse SK signed the Cameroonian 32-year-old forward as free agent. At the start of the 2009–10 Season, Lierse SK were the major favorites to win the championship in the Belgian second division (EXQI League) but when Job arrived, they were struggling in the deciding moments. Job played his first game against KV Turnhout. He entered the game in the second half, when Lierse was behind 0–1 at home and playing badly. He scored 2 goals and gave 1 assist to help Lierse win the match 3–1 and ultimately helped them win the championship, as he also scored the second goal in the deciding match at home against Red Star Waasland (2–0 win).

Job signed a new contract for Lierse for two seasons on 21 June 2010.

== International career ==
Job was tipped early on to be a future French International player, however he instead accepted a call-up to the Cameroon national team, and made his debut in a 2–0 defeat to England at Wembley Stadium in November 1997.

Job has played at two FIFA World Cup finals, in 1998 and 2002. He also played for Cameroon at the victorious 2000 African Cup of Nations and in the FIFA Confederations Cup in 2001 and 2003. However, his next call up to the Cameroon squad came five years later, in March 2007, when he was called up to the squad for a 2008 Africa Cup of Nations qualifier against Liberia.

In January 2008 he scored three goals in two games, scoring once as Cameroon beat Sudan 2–0 in a friendly match and twice as Cameroon beat Zambia 5–1 in a 2008 African Cup of Nations qualifying match. He was also in the Cameroon squad for the 2008 Africa Cup of Nations.

== Personal life ==
Job is the cousin of Marvin Matip and former Liverpool defender Joël Matip.

== Career statistics ==
=== International ===
Appearances and goals by national team and year
National team	Year	Apps	Goals
Cameroon	1997	3	1
Cameroon	1998	12	1
Cameroon	1999	3	2
Cameroon	2000	6	0
Cameroon	2001	7	1
Cameroon	2002	3	0
Cameroon	2003	6	1
Cameroon	2004	3	1
Cameroon	2005	2	0
Cameroon	2007	3	0
Cameroon	2008	3	2
Total		51	9

Scores and results list Cameroon, s goal tally first, score column indicates score after each Job goal.

List of international goals scored by Joseph-Désiré Job
No.	Date	Venue	Opponent	Score	Result	Competition
1	14 December 1997	Cairo International Stadium, Cairo, Egypt	Togo	3–1	3–1	Friendly
2	15 February 1998	Stade Municipal, Ouagadougou, Burkina Faso	Algeria	1–1	2–1	1998 Africa Cup of Nations
3	11 April 1999	Estádio da Machava, Maputo, Mozambique	Mozambique	1–0	6–1	2000 Africa Cup of Nations qualification
4	11 April 1999	Estádio da Machava, Maputo, Mozambique	Mozambique	2–0	6–1	2000 Africa Cup of Nations qualification
5	25 January 2001	Stade de l'Amitié, Cotonou, Benin	Benin	2–1	3–1	Friendly
6	27 March 2003	7 November Stadium, Tunis, Tunisia	Madagascar	2–0	2–0	2003 Tunis Four Nations Tournament
7	9 October 2004	Al-Merrikh Stadium, Omdurman, Sudan	Sudan	1–1	1–1	2006 FIFA World Cup qualification
8	26 January 2008	Baba Yara Stadium, Kumasi, Ghana	Zambia	2–0	5–1	2008 Africa Cup of Nations
9	26 January 2008	Baba Yara Stadium, Kumasi, Ghana	Zambia	5–0	5–1	2008 Africa Cup of Nations

== Honours ==
Middlesbrough

- Football League Cup: 2003–04

Al-Ittihad

- AFC Champions League: 2005

Cameroon

- African Cup of Nations: 2000; runner-up, 2008
- FIFA Confederations Cup: runner up, 2003
