= Brian Close (footballer, born 1982) =

Northern Irish footballer

Personal information
- Full name: Brian Aidan Close
- Date of birth: 27 January 1982 (age 44)
- Place of birth: Belfast, Northern Ireland
- Height: 5 ft 10 in (1.78 m)
- Positions: Defender; midfielder

Team information
- Current team: Guisborough Town

Senior career*
| Years | Team | Apps | (Gls) |
| 2002–2004 | Middlesbrough | 0 | (0) |
| 2003 | → Chesterfield (loan) | 8 | (1) |
| 2004–2007 | Darlington | 83 | (0) |
| 2007–2009 | Billingham Synthonia | | |
| 20??–2011 | Stokesley | | |
| 2011–2013 | Sunderland RCA | | |
| 2013–2015 | West Auckland Town | | |
| 2015–2016 | Newton Aycliffe | | |
| 2016–2017 | West Auckland Town | | |
| 2017– | Guisborough Town | | |

International career
| 2001–2003 | Northern Ireland U21 | 10 | (0) |
| 2004 | Northern Ireland U23 | 1 | (0) |
- * Club domestic league appearances and goals

Brian Aidan Close (born 27 January 1982) is a Northern Irish football defender or midfielder who plays for Northern Premier League Division One East club Guisborough Town.

Close played in the Football League for Chesterfield and Darlington. He was on the books of Middlesbrough without playing league football for them, and played non-league football for clubs including Billingham Synthonia, Stokesley, Sunderland RCA, West Auckland Town, with whom he reached and lost in the 2014 FA Vase Final, Newton Aycliffe, and a second spell at West Auckland Town, before joining Guisborough Town in September 2017.

He represented Northern Ireland at under-21 and under-23 level.
