= Craig Dove =

English footballer

Personal information
- Date of birth: 6 August 1983 (age 43)
- Place of birth: Hartlepool, England
- Position: Midfielder

Team information
- Current team: Alsager Town

Senior career*
Years	Team	Apps	(Gls)
2002–2004	Middlesbrough	0	(0)
2003	→ York City (loan)	1	(0)
2004–2005	Rushden & Diamonds	36	(6)
2005–2006	Chester City	5	(0)
2006	→ Forest Green Rovers (loan)	5	(0)
2006–2007	Buxton	8	(1)
2008–2014	Kidsgrove Athletic		
2014–	Alsager Town		
- * Club domestic league appearances and goals

Craig Dove (born 6 August 1983) is an English footballer who plays for Alsager Town.

== Career ==
Starting his career with Middlesbrough, Dove joined York City on a months loan in October 2003. followed by a season at Rushden & Diamonds. He then signed for Chester City and during his time with Chester was loaned out to Forest Green Rovers. He was freed by Chester the following summer, playing 8 games for Buxton the following season but left after failing to hold down a regular place.

In July 2008, Dove joined Northern Premier league side Kidsgrove Athletic. He left Kidsgrove in January 2014 to become assistant manager at Alsager Town.
