= Carlos Marinelli =

Argentine footballer

Personal information
- Full name: Carlos Ariel Marinelli
- Date of birth: 14 March 1982 (age 44)
- Place of birth: Villa de Mayo, Buenos Aires, Argentina
- Height: 1.80 m (5 ft 11 in)
- Position: Attacking midfielder

Youth career
- Argentinos Juniors
- 1996–1999: Boca Juniors

Senior career*
Years	Team	Apps	(Gls)
1999	Boca Juniors	0	(0)
1999–2003	Middlesbrough	43	(3)
2003	→ Torino (loan)	7	(0)
2004	Boca Juniors	3	(0)
2004	Racing Club	11	(0)
2005	Torino	16	(1)
2006	Braga	4	(0)
2007–2008	Kansas City Wizards	41	(1)
2009	Millonarios	11	(0)
2010	Aldosivi	13	(2)
2010	Győri	2	(0)
2011–2014	USMP	77	(7)

International career
1998–1999	Argentina U17	6	(0)
2000	Argentina U20	1+	(2)
- * Club domestic league appearances and goals as of 27 April 2015

Carlos Ariel Marinelli (born 14 March 1982 in Villa de Mayo, Buenos Aires) is an Argentine former footballer, who played as an attacking midfielder.

== Club career ==
=== Boca Juniors ===
Son of Héctor Marinelli, a former Boca Juniors player, Marinelli started off his youth career at Argentinos Juniors before being signed by Boca Juniors in a package of youth players that included names such as Juan Román Riquelme, Fabricio Coloccini and César La Paglia.

Marinelli had only one reserve appearance against Independiente in August 1999 before being spotted by Middlesbrough when Boca's U-19 team played in Europe. On 27 October 1999, he joined the English side for £1.5 million.

=== Middlesbrough ===
Billed as the new Maradona by the English press, Marinelli played his first match for Middlesbrough for the reserve team against Barnsley, scoring from a free-kick in a game that had an attendance of nearly 10,000 people. He made his first team debut at the 1999 Boxing Day Premier League match against Sheffield Wednesday, playing the second half in a 1–0 loss. He had a second Premier League appearance that season in a 1–1 draw against Watford.

The following season, Marinelli played a total of 13 matches with only 305 minutes of action, averaging less than 25 minutes per match played. He was sent off in the 2–2 draw against Bradford City on 25 November 2000 and had dealt with ankle injuries that cost his place at the Argentina under-20 squad for the 2001 South American U-20 Championship.

Under Steve McClaren, who was appointed manager for the 2001–02 season, Marinelli featured regularly for the first team after recovering from a calf injury earlier in the season and earned a regular spot in the first team after a 5–1 win against Derby County, in which he scored his first goal for the team and later his second, had one assist and contributed to another goal after having a shot rebounded to Szilárd Németh. Losing his starting place in the second half of the season, Marinelli ended the 2001–02 season with 20 appearances.

After an unimpressive start in the 2002–03 season, Marinelli played just 7 league matches in the season, having scored once against Brentford in a 2002–03 Football League Cup match. After being close to returning to Boca Juniors, he stalled on the move after a managerial change at the Argentinian club.

==== Loan to Torino ====
On 31 January 2003, he was loaned to Torino until the end of the season, playing a total of 7 Serie A matches, receiving a red card in the derby against Juventus after pushing the referee. Although Torino wanted to sign Marinelli on a permanent basis, the deal called off after both parties disagreed on the wage fee.

=== Return to Middlesbrough ===
After returning to Middlesbrough, Marinelli played in the 2003–04 season opener against Fulham, scoring once in the 3–2 loss, which was his last league match for Boro. On 14 November 2003, his contract was ended by mutual consent after failing to live up to expectations.

=== Boca Juniors ===
After becoming a free agent, Marinelli stated his desire to return to Boca Juniors and signed for his boyhood club in 2004. His official debut was against Vélez Sarsfield in a 3–3 draw, when he scored on his debut against Vélez only to have it officially awarded as an own goal. However, he took the blame of a goal scored by Marcelo de Souza after being beaten by the opponent and failing to chase him back. He only played other two league matches against Banfield and Racing and was overlooked by then manager Carlos Bianchi after being sent off in a reserve match. Marinelli took part in the 2004–05 preseason friendlies under Miguel Ángel Brindisi, before leaving the club.

=== Racing Club ===
Marinelli joined Racing for the 2004–05 season and made his league debut against former club Boca Juniors. Mostly a substitute, he ended 2004 with 11 league appearances for Racing.

=== Return to Torino ===
In January 2005, after attracting interest from Torino, Marinelli paid 30,000 Euros from his own pocket to leave Racing and return to the Italian side. His debut at Serie B was against Hellas Verona and he was sent off just as his last match at the club. Scoring in a 3–1 win against Pescara, Marinelli played a total of 16 league matches and helped Torino to achieve promotion to 2005–06 Serie A, but the team was not admitted at the first tier for financial problems and his contract was ended due to the financial crisis at the club.

=== Sporting Braga ===
In September 2005, Marinelli had the opportunity to join Portuguese side Braga, but had his registration denied by Primeira Liga after the end of the transfer window. He agreed a deal in December and officially signed in January 2006. He played only four times for the Portuguese side and left the club after the end of the 2005–06 season. Having limited playing time at Braga due to an injury in his right foot, he returned to Argentina for treatment and trained with Boca Juniors to regain match fitness.

=== Kansas City Wizards ===
In 2007, he joined the Kansas City Wizards of Major League Soccer after the American club went to Argentina in their preseason and became interested in the player after seeing him in video.

Marinelli scored his only goal for the Wizards on his debut, from the penalty spot, in a 2–1 loss against Chicago Fire. He ended the 2007 Major League Soccer season with 26 appearances and 5 assists, also playing once in the 2007 MLS Cup Playoffs. The following year, Marinelli played only 15 matches, being a starter in only 7 of them and left the club at the end of the 2008 season.

=== Millonarios ===
On 9 December 2008, Millonarios de Bogotá signed Marinelli on a one-year contract for the 2009 Torneo Finalización. At the Colombian club, he played a total of 11 matches and was sent off three times and was released by Millonarios along with four other under-productive players, but claimed he left the club after not receiving his wages. In 2015, FIFA ruled the situation in favour of the player and Millionarios were obliged to pay $550,000 for the player.

=== Aldosivi ===
After being close to signing for Argentinos Juniors and a period of trial at Huracán, Marinelli joined Aldosivi on 17 December 2009. He played a total of 13 matches and scored twice for the Primera B Nacional club.

=== Győri ===
In September 2010, Marinelli returned to European football after he signed for Hungarian side Győri in a short-term deal. He decided to end his contract after only two league matches, stating that his family failed to adapt to the country.

=== Universidad San Martín ===
On 19 January 2011, Marinelli signed with Peruvian first division team Universidad San Martín, taking part at the 2011 Copa Libertadores and scoring once. Marinelli stayed at the Peruvian club for four years, briefly leaving the club for a week to try to join Argentine club Alvarado which would play the Torneo Argentino A, in the third tier of the Argentinian football, although he was still contracted to Universidad San Martín.

At the age of 32, Marinelli decided to retire in 2014 due to injuries.

== International career ==
Marinelli played for the Argentina national under-17 football team at the 1998 Mundialito Youth Tournament, where they were champions and in the 1999 South American Under-17 Football Championship, playing three matches as Argentina finished in 4th place and failed to qualify for the 1999 FIFA U-17 World Championship. He also played in friendly matches for the Argentina national under-20 football team as they prepared for the 2001 South American U-20 Championship, scoring twice in a match against Bolivia.
