= 1998–99 Middlesbrough F.C. season =

Middlesbrough F.C.
1998–99 season
- Chairman: Steve Gibson
- Manager: Bryan Robson
- Stadium: Riverside Stadium
- FA Premier League: 9th
- FA Cup: Third round
- League Cup: Third round
- Top goalscorer: League: Hamilton Ricard (15); All: Hamilton Ricard (18)
- Highest home attendance: 34,687 (vs. Tottenham Hotspur, 20 February)
- Lowest home attendance: 11,531 (vs. Wycombe Wanderers, 16 September)
- Average home league attendance: 34,386

During the 1998–99 English football season, Middlesbrough competed in the FA Premier League.

== Season summary ==
Middlesbrough were the only newly promoted side to avoid relegation in 1998–99. They attained an impressive ninth-place finish in the final table - too high for relegation, but not quite high enough for a UEFA Cup place; they even rose as high as fourth by Christmas after a surprise 3–2 win at Old Trafford against champions Manchester United but they drew 15 games throughout the league season which ultimately prevented them from finishing any higher. Still, it was their highest finish for more than 20 years and a step in the right direction for manager Bryan Robson – who had come close to European qualification (via the cup competitions) in the previous two campaigns.

== Final league table ==
| Pos | Team | Pld | W | D | L | GF | GA | GD | Pts | Qualification or relegation |
|---|---|---|---|---|---|---|---|---|---|---|
| 7 | Liverpool | 38 | 15 | 9 | 14 | 68 | 49 | +19 | 54 | |
| 8 | Derby County | 38 | 13 | 13 | 12 | 40 | 45 | −5 | 52 | |
| 9 | Middlesbrough | 38 | 12 | 15 | 11 | 48 | 54 | −6 | 51 | |
| 10 | Leicester City | 38 | 12 | 13 | 13 | 40 | 46 | −6 | 49 | |
| 11 | Tottenham Hotspur | 38 | 11 | 14 | 13 | 47 | 50 | −3 | 47 | Qualification for the UEFA Cup first round (Note: Tottenham Hotspur qualified for the UEFA Cup as League Cup winners.) |

Source: Premier League
Rules for classification: 1) points; 2) goal difference; 3) number of goals scored.
Notes:

Results summary

| Overall | | | | | | | | Home | | | | | | Away | | | | | |
| Pld | W | D | L | GF | GA | GD | Pts | W | D | L | GF | GA | GD | W | D | L | GF | GA | GD |
|---|---|---|---|---|---|---|---|---|---|---|---|---|---|---|---|---|---|---|---|
| 38 | 12 | 15 | 11 | 48 | 54 | −6 | 51 | 7 | 9 | 3 | 25 | 18 | +7 | 5 | 6 | 8 | 23 | 36 | −13 |

Source: 1998-99 FA Premier League table

Results by round

| Round | 1 | 2 | 3 | 4 | 5 | 6 | 7 | 8 | 9 | 10 | 11 | 12 | 13 | 14 | 15 | 16 | 17 | 18 | 19 | 20 | 21 | 22 | 23 | 24 | 25 | 26 | 27 | 28 | 29 | 30 | 31 | 32 | 33 | 34 | 35 | 36 | 37 | 38 |
|---|---|---|---|---|---|---|---|---|---|---|---|---|---|---|---|---|---|---|---|---|---|---|---|---|---|---|---|---|---|---|---|---|---|---|---|---|---|---|
| Ground | H | A | H | A | A | H | A | H | H | A | H | A | A | H | A | H | H | A | H | A | H | A | H | A | A | H | A | H | A | A | H | H | H | A | H | A | H | A |
| Result | D | L | D | W | W | D | L | W | W | D | D | D | D | W | D | D | W | W | L | L | D | L | D | L | L | D | L | W | W | D | W | W | D | W | L | D | L | L |
| Position | 12 | 17 | 17 | 12 | 6 | 6 | 12 | 3 | 3 | 4 | 4 | 4 | 7 | 6 | 7 | 7 | 4 | 4 | 6 | 8 | 9 | 9 | 10 | 10 | 11 | 11 | 13 | 12 | 11 | 11 | 9 | 8 | 7 | 7 | 7 | 7 | 9 | 9 |

Source: 11v11.com: 1998-99 Middlesbrough results
A = Away; H = Home; W = Win; D = Draw; L = Loss

== Results ==
Middlesbrough's score comes first

=== Legend ===
| Win | Draw | Loss |

=== FA Premier League ===
| Date | Opponent | Venue | Result | Attendance | Scorers |
|---|---|---|---|---|---|
| 15 August 1998 | Leeds United | H | 0–0 | 34,162 | |
| 23 August 1998 | Aston Villa | A | 1–3 | 29,559 | Beck |
| 29 August 1998 | Derby County | H | 1–1 | 34,121 | Ricard |
| 9 September 1998 | Leicester City | A | 1–0 | 20,635 | Gascoigne |
| 13 September 1998 | Tottenham Hotspur | A | 3–0 | 30,437 | Ricard (2), Kinder |
| 19 September 1998 | Everton | H | 2–2 | 34,563 | Ricard (2) |
| 26 September 1998 | Chelsea | A | 0–2 | 34,811 | |
| 3 October 1998 | Sheffield Wednesday | H | 4–0 | 34,163 | Beck (2), Ricard, Gascoigne |
| 17 October 1998 | Blackburn Rovers | H | 2–1 | 34,413 | Ricard (pen), Fleming |
| 24 October 1998 | Wimbledon | A | 2–2 | 14,114 | Mustoe, Ricard |
| 1 November 1998 | Nottingham Forest | H | 1–1 | 34,223 | Deane |
| 7 November 1998 | Southampton | A | 3–3 | 15,202 | Gascoigne, Lundekvam (own goal), Festa |
| 15 November 1998 | Charlton Athletic | A | 1–1 | 20,043 | Stamp |
| 21 November 1998 | Coventry City | H | 2–0 | 34,293 | Gordon, Ricard |
| 29 November 1998 | Arsenal | A | 1–1 | 38,075 | Deane |
| 6 December 1998 | Newcastle United | H | 2–2 | 34,629 | Townsend, Cooper |
| 12 December 1998 | West Ham United | H | 1–0 | 34,623 | Deane |
| 19 December 1998 | Manchester United | A | 3–2 | 55,152 | Ricard, Gordon, Deane |
| 26 December 1998 | Liverpool | H | 1–3 | 34,626 | Deane |
| 28 December 1998 | Derby County | A | 1–2 | 32,726 | Beck |
| 9 January 1999 | Aston Villa | H | 0–0 | 34,643 | |
| 16 January 1999 | Leeds United | A | 0–2 | 37,473 | |
| 30 January 1999 | Leicester City | H | 0–0 | 34,631 | |
| 6 February 1999 | Liverpool | A | 1–3 | 44,384 | Stamp |
| 17 February 1999 | Everton | A | 0–5 | 31,606 | |
| 20 February 1999 | Tottenham Hotspur | H | 0–0 | 34,687 | |
| 27 February 1999 | Sheffield Wednesday | A | 1–3 | 24,534 | Mustoe |
| 14 March 1999 | Southampton | H | 3–0 | 33,387 | Beck, Ricard, Vickers |
| 20 March 1999 | Nottingham Forest | A | 2–1 | 21,468 | Ricard, Deane |
| 3 April 1999 | Blackburn Rovers | A | 0–0 | 27,482 | |
| 5 April 1999 | Wimbledon | H | 3–1 | 33,999 | Ricard (2), Festa |
| 10 April 1999 | Charlton Athletic | H | 2–0 | 34,529 | Ricard, Mustoe |
| 14 April 1999 | Chelsea | H | 0–0 | 34,406 | |
| 17 April 1999 | Coventry City | A | 2–1 | 19,231 | Kinder, Gordon |
| 24 April 1999 | Arsenal | H | 1–6 | 34,630 | Armstrong |
| 1 May 1999 | Newcastle United | A | 1–1 | 36,552 | Mustoe |
| 9 May 1999 | Manchester United | H | 0–1 | 34,665 | |
| 16 May 1999 | West Ham United | A | 0–4 | 25,902 | |

=== FA Cup ===
| Round | Date | Opponent | Venue | Result | Attendance | Goalscorers |
|---|---|---|---|---|---|---|
| R3 | 3 January 1999 | Manchester United | A | 1–3 | 52,232 | Townsend |

=== League Cup ===
| Round | Date | Opponent | Venue | Result | Attendance | Goalscorers |
|---|---|---|---|---|---|---|
| R2 1st Leg | 16 September 1998 | Wycombe Wanderers | H | 2–0 | 11,531 | Ricard, Festa |
| R2 2nd Leg | 22 September 1998 | Wycombe Wanderers | A | 1–1 (won 3–1 on agg) | 5,698 | Ricard |
| R3 | 28 October 1998 | Everton | H | 2–3 | 20,748 | Summerbell, Ricard |

== Squad ==
Note: Flags indicate national team as defined under FIFA eligibility rules; some limited exceptions apply. Players may hold more than one non-FIFA nationality.

| No. | Pos. | Nation | Player |
|---|---|---|---|
| 1 | GK | (Australia) AUS | Mark Schwarzer |
| 2 | DF | (Republic of Ireland) IRL | Curtis Fleming |
| 3 | DF | (England) ENG | Dean Gordon |
| 4 | DF | (England) ENG | Steve Vickers |
| 5 | DF | (Italy) ITA | Gianluca Festa |
| 6 | DF | (England) ENG | Gary Pallister |
| 7 | MF | (England) ENG | Robbie Mustoe |
| 8 | MF | (England) ENG | Paul Gascoigne |
| 9 | FW | (Italy) ITA | Marco Branca |
| 10 | FW | (England) ENG | Brian Deane |
| 11 | MF | (Republic of Ireland) IRL | Alan Moore |
| 13 | GK | (England) ENG | Marlon Beresford |
| 14 | MF | (England) ENG | Phil Stamp |
| 15 | MF | (England) ENG | Neil Maddison |
| 16 | MF | (Republic of Ireland) IRL | Andy Townsend (Note: Townsend was born in England.) (captain) |

| No. | Pos. | Nation | Player |
|---|---|---|---|
| 17 | DF | (Slovakia) SVK | Vladimír Kinder |
| 18 | FW | (England) ENG | Andy Campbell |
| 19 | FW | (Colombia) COL | Hamilton Ricard |
| 20 | FW | (England) ENG | Alun Armstrong |
| 21 | DF | (England) ENG | Craig Harrison |
| 22 | MF | (England) ENG | Mark Summerbell |
| 23 | MF | (Republic of Ireland) IRL | Keith O'Neill |
| 24 | DF | (England) ENG | Steve Baker |
| 25 | GK | (England) ENG | Ben Roberts |
| 27 | MF | (England) ENG | Anthony Ormerod |
| 28 | DF | (Scotland) SCO | Robbie Stockdale |
| 29 | DF | (England) ENG | Colin Cooper |
| 30 | MF | (Republic of Ireland) IRL | Micky Cummins |
| 31 | DF | (Republic of Ireland) IRL | Jason Gavin |

=== Left club during season ===
Note: Flags indicate national team as defined under FIFA eligibility rules; some limited exceptions apply. Players may hold more than one non-FIFA nationality.

| No. | Pos. | Nation | Player |
|---|---|---|---|
| 10 | MF | (England) ENG | Paul Merson (to Aston Villa) |
| 12 | FW | (Denmark) DEN | Mikkel Beck (to Derby) |
| 23 | DF | (Wales) WAL | Clayton Blackmore (to Barnsley) |

| No. | Pos. | Nation | Player |
|---|---|---|---|
| 26 | DF | (Argentina) ARG | Gustavo Lombardi (on loan from River Plate) |
| — | FW | (England) ENG | Kris Trevor (to Gateshead) |

=== Reserve squad ===
Note: Flags indicate national team as defined under FIFA eligibility rules; some limited exceptions apply. Players may hold more than one non-FIFA nationality.

| No. | Pos. | Nation | Player |
|---|---|---|---|
| - | GK | (Australia) AUS | Brad Jones |
| - | DF | (England) ENG | Christian Hanson |
| - | MF | (England) ENG | Richard Kell |
| - | MF | (Republic of Ireland) IRL | Ronnie O'Brien |

| No. | Pos. | Nation | Player |
|---|---|---|---|
| - | MF | (Republic of Ireland) IRL | John O'Loughlin |
| - | MF | (England) ENG | Andrew Swalwell |
| - | MF | (England) ENG | Steve Walklate |
| - | FW | (England) ENG | Paul Connor |

== Statistics ==
=== Appearances, goals and cards ===
(Starting appearances + substitute appearances)

| No. | Pos. | Name | League | | FA Cup | | League Cup | | Total | | Discipline | |
| No. | Pos. | Name | Apps | Goals | Apps | Goals | Apps | Goals | Apps | Goals | Yellow card | Red card |
|---|---|---|---|---|---|---|---|---|---|---|---|---|
| 1 | GK | (Australia) Mark Schwarzer | 34 | 0 | 1 | 0 | 0 | 0 | 35 | 0 | 1 | 0 |
| 2 | DF | (Republic of Ireland) Curtis Fleming | 12+2 | 1 | 1 | 0 | 1 | 0 | 14+2 | 1 | 2 | 0 |
| 3 | DF | (England) Dean Gordon | 38 | 3 | 1 | 0 | 2 | 0 | 41 | 3 | 3 | 0 |
| 4 | DF | (England) Steve Vickers | 30+1 | 1 | 0 | 0 | 3 | 0 | 33+1 | 1 | 5 | 0 |
| 5 | DF | (Italy) Gianluca Festa | 25 | 2 | 0 | 0 | 2 | 1 | 27 | 3 | 9 | 0 |
| 6 | DF | (England) Gary Pallister | 26 | 0 | 1 | 0 | 0 | 0 | 27 | 0 | 5 | 0 |
| 7 | MF | (England) Robbie Mustoe | 32+1 | 4 | 1 | 0 | 1 | 0 | 34+1 | 4 | 8 | 1 |
| 8 | MF | (England) Paul Gascoigne | 25+1 | 3 | 1 | 0 | 2 | 0 | 28+1 | 3 | 13 | 0 |
| 9 | FW | (Italy) Marco Branca | 0+1 | 0 | 0 | 0 | 0 | 0 | 0+1 | 0 | 0 | 0 |
| 10 | FW | (England) Brian Deane | 24+2 | 6 | 1 | 0 | 0+1 | 0 | 25+3 | 6 | 3 | 0 |
| 10 | MF | (England) Paul Merson | 3 | 0 | 0 | 0 | 0 | 0 | 3 | 0 | 0 | 0 |
| 11 | MF | (Republic of Ireland) Alan Moore | 3+1 | 0 | 0 | 0 | 1 | 0 | 4+1 | 0 | 0 | 0 |
| 12 | FW | (Denmark) Mikkel Beck | 13+14 | 5 | 0+1 | 0 | 2 | 0 | 15+15 | 5 | 2 | 0 |
| 13 | GK | (England) Marlon Beresford | 4 | 0 | 0 | 0 | 3 | 0 | 7 | 0 | 0 | 0 |
| 14 | MF | (England) Phil Stamp | 5+11 | 2 | 0+1 | 0 | 3 | 0 | 8+12 | 2 | 1 | 1 |
| 15 | MF | (England) Neil Maddison | 10+10 | 0 | 1 | 0 | 1 | 0 | 12+10 | 0 | 1 | 0 |
| 16 | MF | (Republic of Ireland) Andy Townsend | 35 | 1 | 1 | 1 | 1 | 0 | 37 | 2 | 10 | 0 |
| 17 | DF | (Slovakia) Vladimír Kinder | 0+5 | 2 | 0 | 0 | 1 | 0 | 1+5 | 2 | 1 | 0 |
| 18 | FW | (England) Andy Campbell | 1+7 | 0 | 0 | 0 | 1+2 | 0 | 2+9 | 0 | 1 | 0 |
| 19 | FW | (Colombia) Hamilton Ricard | 32+4 | 15 | 1 | 0 | 3 | 3 | 36+4 | 18 | 6 | 0 |
| 20 | FW | (England) Alun Armstrong | 0+6 | 1 | 0 | 0 | 0 | 0 | 0+6 | 1 | 0 | 0 |
| 21 | DF | (England) Craig Harrison | 3+1 | 0 | 0 | 0 | 1+1 | 0 | 4+2 | 0 | 0 | 0 |
| 22 | MF | (England) Mark Summerbell | 7+4 | 0 | 0 | 0 | 0+2 | 1 | 7+6 | 1 | 4 | 0 |
| 23 | DF | (Wales) Clayton Blackmore | 0 | 0 | 0 | 0 | 1 | 0 | 1 | 0 | 0 | 0 |
| 23 | MF | (Republic of Ireland) Keith O'Neill | 4+2 | 0 | 0 | 0 | 0 | 0 | 4+2 | 0 | 2 | 0 |
| 24 | DF | (England) Steve Baker | 1+1 | 0 | 0 | 0 | 0 | 0 | 1+1 | 0 | 0 | 0 |
| 27 | MF | (England) Anthony Ormerod | 0 | 0 | 0 | 0 | 0+1 | 0 | 0+1 | 0 | 0 | 0 |
| 28 | DF | (Scotland) Robbie Stockdale | 17+2 | 0 | 0 | 0 | 3 | 0 | 20+2 | 0 | 4 | 0 |
| 29 | DF | (England) Colin Cooper | 32+1 | 1 | 1 | 0 | 1 | 0 | 34+1 | 1 | 5 | 0 |
| 30 | MF | (Republic of Ireland) Micky Cummins | 1 | 0 | 0 | 0 | 0 | 0 | 1 | 0 | 0 | 0 |
| 31 | DF | (Republic of Ireland) Jason Gavin | 2 | 0 | 0 | 0 | 0 | 0 | 2 | 0 | 0 | 0 |

== Transfers ==
=== In ===
| Date | Pos. | Name | From | Fee |
|---|---|---|---|---|
| 6 July 1998 | DF | Dean Gordon | Crystal Palace | £900,000 |
| 6 July 1998 | DF | Gary Pallister | Manchester United | £2,500,000 |
| 18 August 1998 | DF | Colin Cooper | Nottingham Forest | £2,500,000 |
| 12 October 1998 | FW | Brian Deane | Benfica | £3,000,000 |
| 18 March 1999 | MF | Keith O'Neill | Norwich City | £700,000 |

=== Out ===
| Date | Pos. | Name | To | Fee |
|---|---|---|---|---|
| 1 July 1998 | DF | Craig Liddle | Darlington | Free transfer |
| 8 September 1998 | MF | Paul Merson | Aston Villa | £6,750,000 |
| 25 February 1999 | DF | Clayton Blackmore | Barnsley | Free transfer |
| 25 March 1999 | FW | Mikkel Beck | Derby County | £500,000 |
| 25 March 1999 | FW | Kris Trevor | Gateshead | Free transfer |
| 20 May 1999 | FW | Paul Connor | Stoke City | Free transfer |

Transfers in: ▼£9,600,000
Transfers out: ▲£7,250,000
Total spending: ▼£2,350,000
