= 1996–97 in English football =

Football in England
- Season: 1996–97

Men's football
- FA Premier League: Manchester United
- First Division: Bolton Wanderers
- Second Division: Bury
- Third Division: Wigan Athletic
- Football Conference: Macclesfield Town
- FA Cup: Chelsea
- Football League Trophy: Carlisle United
- League Cup: Leicester City
- Charity Shield: Manchester United

Women's football
- Premier League National Division: Arsenal
- Premier League Northern Division: Bradford City
- Premier League Southern Division: Berkhamsted Town
- FA Women's Cup: Millwall Lionesses
- Premier League Cup: Millwall Lionesses

The 1996–97 season was the 117th season of competitive football in England. Promotion to and relegation from the Football League returned after a three-season absence, with one relegation spot in Division Three.

== Overview ==
=== Premier League ===
Manchester United won their second consecutive title, despite a spell in the autumn where they lost three games and conceded 13 goals. They won the title by seven points, as Newcastle, Arsenal and Liverpool fell away in the closing weeks. Nevertheless, their tally of 75 points is the lowest ever recorded by a Premier League winner.

Newcastle United finished second again and qualified for the Champions League preliminary stages, while Arsenal, Liverpool and Leicester City (League Cup winners) qualified for the UEFA Cup.

The three teams relegated were Sunderland, Middlesbrough (after a three-point deduction) and Nottingham Forest.

=== Division One ===
Bolton Wanderers secured promotion to the Premiership after scoring 100 goals and 98 points. Barnsley were promoted to the top flight for the first time in their history, while Crystal Palace returned after a two-year absence by winning the play-offs.

The decline of Oldham Athletic continued, with the club falling into the third tier for the first time in 23 years, and just three years after being in the Premiership. Grimsby Town and Southend United joined them in relegation to Division Two.

=== Division Two ===
Bury won their second consecutive promotion, taking the Division Two title, Stockport County joined them in automatic promotion, and play-off winners Crewe Alexandra completed the trio moving up.

Peterborough United, Shrewsbury Town, Rotherham United and Notts County were relegated. County had been in the top division just five years earlier.

=== Division Three ===
Wigan Athletic won the Division Three title on goals scored from Fulham. Carlisle United and play-off winners Northampton Town also won promotion to Division Two.

Hereford United were the first club for four years to be relegated to the Conference after finishing bottom of Division Three. Conference champions Macclesfield Town replaced Hereford (two years after Town had been denied entry to Division Three).

Peter Shilton who joined Leyton Orient F.C. at the beginning of the season, became the first footballer to make 1000 league appearances in English football on 22 December 1996.

== Events ==
This was only the second time that all four divisional champions came from the same historical county, Lancashire. In 1972-73 all four - Liverpool, Burnley, Bolton and Southport - were also Lancashire-based.

=== Keegan quits Newcastle ===
On 5 January 1997, Newcastle United were hit with perhaps the biggest shock in their history: Kevin Keegan resigned as manager. His reason for quitting was that he felt he had taken the club as far as he could. During his five years at St James's Park, Keegan had overseen a revolution in Newcastle's fortunes. On his appointment in February 1992, the club had been second from bottom in the old Second Division and looked favourites for relegation, but he kept them in the Second Division and they were founder members of the new Division One in 1992–93. A superb run of form kept them at the top of the division all season and they went up to the Premiership as Division One champions. Third and sixth-place finishes followed before Newcastle led the Premiership for most of 1995–96, only to be overhauled by Manchester United in the final weeks of the season. He had walked out on Newcastle as they looked well placed to challenge for a league title. Kenny Dalglish was appointed manager of Newcastle in Keegan's place.

=== Manchester United ===
Manchester United collected their fourth Premiership title in five seasons, despite a testing period which saw them lose their 40-year unbeaten home record in Europe against Turkish club Fenerbahçe, suffer elimination from the FA Cup at the hands of Wimbledon, and concede 13 goals in three Premiership games during late October, including a 5–0 defeat by Newcastle United and a 6–3 defeat by Southampton. Alex Ferguson had built on the success of the previous season's double-winning team thanks largely to two new signings – Norwegians Ronny Johnsen (central defender) and Ole Gunnar Solskjær (striker). The two Norwegians were little known outside their homeland when they arrived at Old Trafford. Johnsen proved himself as one of the Premiership's best defenders, while Solskjær topped the club's goalscoring charts with 18 Premiership goals. Meanwhile, 22-year-old midfielder David Beckham won the PFA Young Player of the Year award.

=== Cantona retires ===
On 18 May, Eric Cantona announced his retirement from playing.

=== Middlesbrough relegated ===
Middlesbrough were relegated from the Premiership despite reaching both domestic cup finals during the season. They finished the season in 19th place, and would have avoided relegation had it not been for a 3-point deduction imposed in January as punishment for postponing a fixture against Blackburn Rovers within 24 hours of the scheduled kick-off. Chairman Steve Gibson had appealed against the ruling, protesting that too many players were ill or injured for the club to field a full team, but their appeal was rejected.

The 3-point deduction on Middlesbrough also preserved Coventry City's top flight status for the 31st season running.

=== Brighton survive in relegation decider ===
Brighton & Hove Albion had a traumatic season, the debt-ridden club propping up the League for virtually the entire season. Their precarious financial position had forced the club's directors to sell the Goldstone Ground. Yet on the penultimate day of the season they moved above Hereford United, another club with major financial problems, and the final day of the season saw the two clubs battle it out in a relegation-decider at Edgar Street. Hereford needed to win while Brighton only needed a draw to survive. At half time the score was 1–0 to Hereford but Brighton equalised in the second half against the run of play. The match finished 1–1 and, with the teams level on points, the Seagulls stayed up on goals scored while the Bulls were relegated to the Conference.

=== Chesterfield reach the FA Cup semi-final ===
Chesterfield, playing in the third tier of English football, reached the FA Cup semi-final. On the way to the semi-final they beat Nottingham Forest 1–0 and Bolton Wanderers 3–2, with a hat trick from a young Kevin Davies. In the semis they met Middlesbrough at Old Trafford. After going 2–0 up Boro bought it back to 2–2, but not after controversy when Jonathan Howard's shot hit the underside of the crossbar and clearly crossed the line, but was waved off by the referee despite the linesman calling it in. The match finished 3–3 AET and Chesterfield went on to lose the replay 3–0. Boro's win however led to a defeat in the FA Cup Final, in which a season later they became the first team to lose three domestic finals in a row.

=== Stockport County ===
Stockport County, also playing in the third tier of English football, reached the Football League Cup semi-final. In the first round they beat Chesterfield 4–2 over two legs. In the second round they defeated Division One team Sheffield United 7–3, also over two legs. The third round they came up against former Premier League champions Blackburn Rovers at Ewood Park winning 1–0 in front of a large away crowd. In the fourth round they met West Ham United, drawing the first tie 1–1 at Upton Park before a 2–1 win at Edgeley Park. In the quarter-final, County met Southampton at home, in a match they drew 2–2. In the replay, County unexpectedly won 2–1, with goals from Brett Angell and Andy Mutch. Playing their fourth Premier League team in Middlesbrough, County lost their first leg at home 2–0, conceding goals from Mikkel Beck and Fabrizio Ravanelli. In the second leg, County took the lead after 6 minutes, through Sean Connelly. However, with no further goals scored, they lost 2–1 on aggregate. They remain the only lower league team to have defeated four top division teams in an English Cup competition. In the other cup competitions County reached the fourth round of the FA Cup, eventually losing to Birmingham City and the Northern Final of the Auto-Windscreens Trophy, this time losing to Carlisle United. They maintained their league form during this period, and despite playing 67 games, finishing second in the league, two points behind champions Bury, securing promotion with a 1–0 win at Chesterfield's Saltergate, the winning goal headed in by Brett Angell.

== Successful players ==
22-year-old Manchester United midfielder David Beckham received the PFA Young Player of the Year award as well as collecting a Premiership title medal.

Chelsea's talismanic Italian striker Gianfranco Zola was voted FWA Footballer of the Year as well as collecting an FA Cup winner's medal.

Alan Shearer finished as the Premiership's top scorer with 25 goals in 31 games.

Dion Dublin's 14 Premiership goals almost single-handedly saved Coventry City from relegation.

19-year-old striker Emile Heskey was recognised as one of the young talents after helping Leicester City win the League Cup and finish in the top half of the league.

== Honours ==
Competition	Winner
FA Premier League	Manchester United (11/4*)
FA Cup	Chelsea (2)
Football League Cup	Leicester City (2)
Football League First Division	Bolton Wanderers
Football League Second Division	Bury
Football League Third Division	Wigan Athletic
FA Community Shield	Manchester United

== England national team ==
1 September 1996

Moldova	0–3	England
	Report	Barmby 24'; Gascoigne 25'; Shearer 61'

Republican, Chişinău
Attendance: 9,500
Referee: Ilkka Koho (Finland)

9 October 1996

England	2–1	Poland
Shearer 25', 38'	Report	Citko 7'

Wembley Stadium, London
Attendance: 74,663
Referee: Hellmut Krug (Germany)

9 November 1996

Georgia	0–2	England
	Report	Sheringham 15'; Ferdinand 37'

Boris Paichadze Stadium, Tbilisi
Attendance: 48,000
Referee: Jorge Monteiro Coroado (Portugal)

12 February 1997

England	0–1	Italy
	Report	Zola 20'

Wembley Stadium, London
Attendance: 75,055
Referee: Sándor Puhl (Hungary)

29 March 1997

England	2–0	Mexico
Sheringham 20' (pen.); Fowler 55'

Wembley Stadium, London
Attendance: 48,076
Referee: Vítor Melo Pereira (Portugal)

30 April 1997

England	2–0	Georgia
Sheringham 43'; Shearer 90'	Report

Wembley Stadium, London
Attendance: 71,208
Referee: Remi Harrel (France)

24 May 1997

England	2–1	South Africa
Lee 20'; Wright 76'		Masinga 43'

Old Trafford, Manchester
Attendance: 52,676
Referee: Anders Frisk (Sweden)

31 May 1997

Poland	0–2	England
	Report	Shearer 5'; Sheringham 90'

Silesian Stadium, Chorzów
Attendance: 32,000
Referee: Urs Meier (Switzerland)

4 June 1997

England	2–0	Italy
Wright 26'; Scholes 43'

Stade de la Beaujoire, Nantes
Attendance: 25,000
Referee: Günter Benkö (Austria)

7 June 1997

France	0–1	England
		Shearer 86'

Stade de la Mosson, Montpellier
Attendance: 25,000
Referee: Said Belqola (Morocco)

10 June 1997

England	0–1	Brazil
		Romário 61'

Parc des Princes, Paris
Attendance: 33,000
Referee: John Toro Rendón (Colombia)

== League tables ==
=== FA Premier League ===
For the fourth time in five seasons, Manchester United won the Premier League title. Despite inconsistent form early in the season, including a run that saw them concede 13 goals in three matches, they only lost two more league games all season, going top at the start of February and never surrendering their lead.

The next three sides were separated only by goal difference. Newcastle United finished as runners-up for the second successive season; any hopes of a title challenge were derailed by the shock resignation of inspirational manager Kevin Keegan in January, though they rebounded somewhat under new manager Kenny Dalglish to claim second place. Arsenal, despite a turbulent start to the season which saw manager Bruce Rioch sacked just before their first match and not be formally replaced by Arsène Wenger until the start of October, recovered well to finish in third place. Liverpool finished fourth, having actually lead the table for much of the first half of the season, until their form collapsed after the turn of the year. Aston Villa completed the top five.

Other success stories of the Premier League season included Chelsea, who won the FA Cup to end their 26-year wait for a major trophy and in Ruud Gullit had the first foreign manager to win a major trophy in English football. Newly promoted Leicester City defied the critics who expected them to go straight back down and not only secured survival with a ninth-place finish, but also lifted the League Cup.

Middlesbrough experienced a unique season, they were runners-up in both domestic cups, but a three-point deduction for postponing a league match at short notice just before Christmas ultimately saw them relegated at the end of the season. Coventry City were the lucky team who stayed up at Middlesbrough's expense, while the other two relegation places went to Nottingham Forest after three years and newly promoted Sunderland.

Wimbledon defied the odds to extend their top flight tenure into its twelfth season, with an impressive eighth place league finish (having occupied the top five places for much of the season) and also by reaching the semi-finals of both cups. Leeds United were the lowest scoring team in the Premier League after the early season dismissal of long-serving manager Howard Wilkinson, who was succeeded by George Graham, but they managed to climb clear of the relegation battle to finish 11th. A terrible start to the season cost Ray Harford his job as Blackburn Rovers manager in late October, with interim manager Tony Parkes not securing the club's first win in the league until the following month, leaving them bottom of the division just 18 months after being champions, but Blackburn improved as the season went on and finished a secure 13th.

Pos	Team	Pld	W	D	L	GF	GA	GD	Pts	Qualification or relegation
1	Manchester United (C)	38	21	12	5	76	44	+32	75	Qualification for the Champions League group stage
2	Newcastle United	38	19	11	8	73	40	+33	68	Qualification for the Champions League second qualifying round
3	Arsenal	38	19	11	8	62	32	+30	68	Qualification for the UEFA Cup first round (Note: Aston Villa was rewarded entry to the UEFA Cup through UEFA Fair Play ranking.)
4	Liverpool	38	19	11	8	62	37	+25	68	Qualification for the UEFA Cup first round
5	Aston Villa	38	17	10	11	47	34	+13	61	Qualification for the UEFA Cup first round
6	Chelsea	38	16	11	11	58	55	+3	59	Qualification for the Cup Winners' Cup first round (Note: Chelsea qualified for the Cup Winners' Cup as FA Cup winners.)
7	Sheffield Wednesday	38	14	15	9	50	51	−1	57	
8	Wimbledon	38	15	11	12	49	46	+3	56	
9	Leicester City	38	12	11	15	46	54	−8	47	Qualification for the UEFA Cup first round (Note: Leicester City qualified for the UEFA Cup as League Cup winners.)
10	Tottenham Hotspur	38	13	7	18	44	51	−7	46	
11	Leeds United	38	11	13	14	28	38	−10	46	
12	Derby County	38	11	13	14	45	58	−13	46	
13	Blackburn Rovers	38	9	15	14	42	43	−1	42	
14	West Ham United	38	10	12	16	39	48	−9	42	
15	Everton	38	10	12	16	44	57	−13	42	
16	Southampton	38	10	11	17	50	56	−6	41	
17	Coventry City	38	9	14	15	38	54	−16	41	
18	Sunderland (R)	38	10	10	18	35	53	−18	40	Relegation to the Football League First Division
19	Middlesbrough (R)	38	10	12	16	51	60	−9	39 (Note: Middlesbrough were docked three points for failing to fulfill their original fixture at Blackburn Rovers on 21 December 1996.)	Relegation to the Football League First Division
20	Nottingham Forest (R)	38	6	16	16	31	59	−28	34	Relegation to the Football League First Division

Source: Premier League
Rules for classification: 1) points; 2) goal difference; 3) number of goals scored.
(C) Champions; (R) Relegated
Notes:

Leading goalscorer: Alan Shearer (Newcastle United) - 25

=== First Division ===
In what was their final season at Burnden Park, Bolton Wanderers easily won promotion straight back to the Premier League, topping the division for the entire season and being promoted with a club record 98 points. Barnsley took the second automatic promotion spot and earned promotion to the top-flight for the first time in their history, beating out Wolverhampton Wanderers, who had occupied second spot for most of the season until a shocking collapse as the season drew to an end. Crystal Palace won promotion back to the Premier League after a two-year absence, and just a few months after Steve Coppell had returned for his third spell as manager.

Portsmouth finished seventh and just missed out on the playoffs after three successive bottom-half finishes, also reaching the FA Cup quarter-finals for the first time in five years. Port Vale finished eighth - one of the highest finishes in their history. Norwich City finished 13th in Mike Walker's comeback season as manager, some dismal results late in the season ending their playoff hopes. Manchester City went through four managers in their first season outside the top flight since 1988–89, finishing 14th after fears of a second successive relegation. Ray Harford returned to management with West Bromwich Albion, securing their survival with a 16th-place finish. Oxford United's early promotion challenge fell away as they finished 17th.

Southend United finished bottom after a poor season and were relegated after six years at this level. Oldham Athletic, who had been in a downward spiral since their relegation from the Premier League three years previously, continued their decline by being relegated in second-bottom place. Grimsby Town were the third relegated side, ultimately going down despite a 4–0 victory in their final match of the season, as fellow strugglers Bradford City also won their final game.

Pos	Team	Pld	W	D	L	GF	GA	GD	Pts	Qualification or relegation
1	Bolton Wanderers (C, P)	46	28	14	4	100	53	+47	98	Promotion to the Premier League
2	Barnsley (P)	46	22	14	10	76	55	+21	80	Promotion to the Premier League
3	Wolverhampton Wanderers	46	22	10	14	68	51	+17	76	Qualification for the First Division play-offs
4	Ipswich Town	46	20	14	12	68	50	+18	74	Qualification for the First Division play-offs
5	Sheffield United	46	20	13	13	75	52	+23	73	Qualification for the First Division play-offs
6	Crystal Palace (O, P)	46	19	14	13	78	48	+30	71	Qualification for the First Division play-offs
7	Portsmouth	46	20	8	18	59	53	+6	68	
8	Port Vale	46	17	16	13	58	55	+3	67	
9	Queens Park Rangers	46	18	12	16	64	60	+4	66	
10	Birmingham City	46	17	15	14	52	48	+4	66	
11	Tranmere Rovers	46	17	14	15	63	56	+7	65	
12	Stoke City	46	18	10	18	51	57	−6	64	
13	Norwich City	46	17	12	17	63	68	−5	63	
14	Manchester City	46	17	10	19	59	60	−1	61	
15	Charlton Athletic	46	16	11	19	52	66	−14	59	
16	West Bromwich Albion	46	14	15	17	68	72	−4	57	
17	Oxford United	46	16	9	21	64	68	−4	57	
18	Reading	46	15	12	19	58	67	−9	57	
19	Swindon Town	46	15	9	22	52	71	−19	54	
20	Huddersfield Town	46	13	15	18	48	61	−13	54	
21	Bradford City	46	12	12	22	47	72	−25	48	
22	Grimsby Town (R)	46	11	13	22	59	81	−22	46	Relegation to the Second Division
23	Oldham Athletic (R)	46	10	13	23	51	66	−15	43	Relegation to the Second Division
24	Southend United (R)	46	8	15	23	42	85	−43	39	Relegation to the Second Division

Rules for classification: 1) Points; 2) Goals scored; 3) Goal difference
(C) Champions; (O) Play-off winners; (P) Promoted; (R) Relegated

Leading goalscorer: John McGinlay (Bolton Wanderers) - 24

=== Second Division ===
Bury won their second successive promotion, returning to the second tier for the first time in thirty years. Stockport took the second automatic promotion spot before the final day of the season despite a fantastic League Cup run that took them to the semi-finals where they were knocked out by Middlesbrough despite winning the second leg, and entered the second tier after nearly 60 years of lower league football, though this achievement was tempered by the loss of manager Dave Jones to Southampton at the end of the season. Capping off the trio of unfancied clubs who won promotion to the second tier, Crewe Alexandra won promotion just three years after being promoted from Division Three, and entered the second tier for the first time since 1896, and the first time overall under a four-division system.

In a season where a host of Division Two clubs made the headlines with cup runs, Wrexham reached the FA Cup quarter-finals, where they were beaten by a Chesterfield side that took Middlesbrough to a replay in the semi-finals after surrendering a two-goal lead which would have made them the first third-tier club to reach the FA Cup final. Unfortunately, the cup excitement took its toll on the league form of both clubs, who fell short of the playoffs.

Notts County, despite being the pre-season promotion favourites, finished bottom after a horrific season and were relegated to the bottom division for the first time in 26 years. Rotherham United fared no better and would actually have finished below Notts County in most seasons, but the League's adoption of "Goals Scored" over "Goal Difference" for this season spared them that indignity. Shrewsbury Town, who had narrowly avoided relegation in the previous two seasons, were unable to achieve survival a third time and fell back into Division Three. The final relegated club was Peterborough United, as Barry Fry made a less than auspicious start to what would prove to be a long association with the club.

Pos	Team	Pld	W	D	L	GF	GA	GD	Pts	Promotion or relegation
1	Bury (C, P)	46	24	12	10	62	38	+24	84	Promotion to the First Division
2	Stockport County (P)	46	23	13	10	59	41	+18	82	Promotion to the First Division
3	Luton Town	46	21	15	10	71	45	+26	78	Qualification for the Second Division play-offs
4	Brentford	46	20	14	12	56	43	+13	74	Qualification for the Second Division play-offs
5	Bristol City	46	21	10	15	69	51	+18	73	Qualification for the Second Division play-offs
6	Crewe Alexandra (O, P)	46	22	7	17	56	47	+9	73	Qualification for the Second Division play-offs
7	Blackpool	46	18	15	13	60	47	+13	69	
8	Wrexham	46	17	18	11	55	50	+5	69	
9	Burnley	46	19	11	16	71	55	+16	68	
10	Chesterfield	46	18	14	14	42	39	+3	68	
11	Gillingham	46	19	10	17	60	59	+1	67	
12	Walsall	46	19	10	17	54	53	+1	67	
13	Watford	46	16	19	11	45	38	+7	67	
14	Millwall	46	16	13	17	50	55	−5	61	
15	Preston North End	46	18	7	21	49	55	−6	61	
16	Bournemouth	46	15	15	16	43	45	−2	60	
17	Bristol Rovers	46	15	11	20	47	50	−3	56	
18	Wycombe Wanderers	46	15	10	21	51	57	−6	55	
19	Plymouth Argyle	46	12	18	16	47	58	−11	54	
20	York City	46	13	13	20	47	68	−21	52	
21	Peterborough United (R)	46	11	14	21	55	73	−18	47	Relegation to the Third Division
22	Shrewsbury Town (R)	46	11	13	22	49	74	−25	46	Relegation to the Third Division
23	Rotherham United (R)	46	7	14	25	39	70	−31	35	Relegation to the Third Division
24	Notts County (R)	46	7	14	25	33	59	−26	35	Relegation to the Third Division

Rules for classification: In the Football League goals scored (GF) takes precedence over goal difference (GD).
(C) Champions; (O) Play-off winners; (P) Promoted; (R) Relegated

Leading goalscorer: Tony Thorpe (Luton Town) - 28

=== Third Division ===
Wigan Athletic won promotion and returned to Division Two after four years in the bottom tier, their free-scoring style ultimately being vindicated as they won the title on goals scored, whereas they would have finished in second place the previous year. Fulham missed out on the title due to this change in rules, though the runners-up spot represented a huge improvement over the previous season, where they had been in danger of relegation to the Football Conference for much of the campaign. Carlisle United took the final automatic promotion spot, and made an immediate return to Division Two. Northampton Town won the play-offs, completing a major turnaround in the three years since they only avoided relegation to the Football Conference on a technicality.

At the bottom, Brighton were docked 2 points due to crowd trouble but in the end they survived relegation to the Conference on Goals Scored at the expense of Hereford.

Pos	Team	Pld	W	D	L	GF	GA	GD	Pts	Promotion or relegation
1	Wigan Athletic (C, P)	46	26	9	11	84	51	+33	87	Promotion to the Second Division
2	Fulham (P)	46	25	12	9	72	38	+34	87	Promotion to the Second Division
3	Carlisle United (P)	46	24	12	10	67	44	+23	84	Promotion to the Second Division
4	Northampton Town (O, P)	46	20	12	14	67	44	+23	72	Qualification for the Third Division play-offs
5	Swansea City	46	21	8	17	62	58	+4	71	Qualification for the Third Division play-offs
6	Chester City	46	18	16	12	55	43	+12	70	Qualification for the Third Division play-offs
7	Cardiff City	46	20	9	17	57	55	+2	69	Qualification for the Third Division play-offs
8	Colchester United	46	17	17	12	62	51	+11	68	
9	Lincoln City	46	18	12	16	70	69	+1	66	
10	Cambridge United	46	18	11	17	53	59	−6	65	
11	Mansfield Town	46	16	16	14	47	45	+2	64	
12	Scarborough	46	16	15	15	66	69	−3	63	
13	Scunthorpe United	46	18	9	19	59	62	−3	63	
14	Rochdale	46	14	16	16	58	58	0	58	
15	Barnet	46	14	16	16	46	51	−5	58	
16	Leyton Orient	46	15	12	19	50	58	−8	57	
17	Hull City	46	13	18	15	44	50	−6	57	
18	Darlington	46	14	10	22	64	78	−14	52	
19	Doncaster Rovers	46	14	10	22	52	66	−14	52	
20	Hartlepool United	46	14	9	23	53	66	−13	51	
21	Torquay United	46	13	11	22	46	62	−16	50	
22	Exeter City	46	12	12	22	48	73	−25	48	
23	Brighton & Hove Albion	46	13	10	23	53	70	−17	47 (Note: Brighton & Hove Albion had two points deducted for failure to control spectators.)	
24	Hereford United (R)	46	11	14	21	50	65	−15	47	Relegation to Football Conference

Rules for classification: In the Football League goals scored (GF) takes precedence over goal difference (GD).
(C) Champions; (O) Play-off winners; (P) Promoted; (R) Relegated
Notes:
- Docked 2 points for crowd trouble

Leading goalscorer: Graeme Jones (Wigan Athletic) – 31

== Transfer deals ==
30 July 1996 – Alan Shearer from Blackburn Rovers to Newcastle United, £15 million

For subsequent transfer deals see 1997–98 in English football.

== Diary of the season ==
1 July 1996 – Chelsea pay a club record £4.9 million for Lazio and Italy midfielder Roberto Di Matteo.

4 July 1996 – Middlesbrough pay a club record £7 million for Juventus and Italy striker Fabrizio Ravanelli.

9 July 1996 – Manchester United make a £12 million offer to Blackburn Rovers for Alan Shearer, with Andy Cole in exchange – an offer which would set a national transfer record. However, the offer is rejected, with Rovers managing director Robert Coar insisting Shearer is not for sale.

10 July 1996 – Manchester United sign Norway defender Ronny Johnsen from Turkish side Beşiktaş.

11 July 1996 – Keith Wiseman succeeds Sir Bert Millichip as chairman of the FA.

20 July 1996 – Manchester United pay Slavia Prague £3.5 million for winger Karel Poborský, who helped Czech Republic reach the final of UEFA Euro 1996.

23 July 1996 – Manchester United sign Norway striker Ole Gunnar Solskjær from Molde for £1.5 million.

26 July 1996 – Jordi Cruyff, son of the legendary Johan, signs for Manchester United from Barcelona for £1.3 million. Coventry City pay a club record £3 million for Leeds United captain Gary McAllister, whose manager Howard Wilkinson uses £2.25 million of the windfall to buy Crystal Palace goalkeeper Nigel Martyn.

30 July 1996 – Newcastle United break the world transfer record by paying Blackburn Rovers £15million for Alan Shearer.

1 August 1996 – Bolton Wanderers sell defender Alan Stubbs to Celtic for £3 million.

2 August 1996 – Aston Villa sign Portuguese international defender Nélson from Sporting CP for £1.7 million.

10 August 1996 – Lee Sharpe leaves Manchester United after eight years and joins Leeds United. Bruce Rioch is sacked after one year as Arsenal manager following a dispute with the club's board, with his assistant Stewart Houston being installed as caretaker manager.

12 August 1996 – Arsenal sack manager Bruce Rioch after a dispute with the club's directors. Johan Cruyff, recently sacked by Barcelona, is reported to be a target in their hunt for a successor, but coach Stewart Houston will remain in charge of the first team until a permanent successor is found.

14 August 1996 – Managerless Arsenal sign French midfielder Patrick Vieira from Milan for £3.5 million. Frenchman Arsène Wenger, currently in charge of Japanese club Nagoya Grampus Eight, is the last to be linked with the manager's job.

11 August 1996 – Manchester United beat Newcastle United 4–0 to win the Charity Shield.

17 August 1996 –

  - – David Beckham scores a late goal from the halfway line in Manchester United's 3–0 away win over Wimbledon on the opening day of the season. Fabrizio Ravanelli scores a hat-trick on his Middlesbrough debut as they draw 3–3 at home to Liverpool. Alan Shearer is on the losing side on his Newcastle league debut as they are beaten 2–0 by Everton at Goodison Park.

18 August 1996 – Speculation mounts that Frenchman Arsène Wenger will take over as manager at Arsenal, who sacked Bruce Rioch earlier this month.

21 August 1996 – Alan Shearer scores his first goal for Newcastle United in their 2–0 home league win over Wimbledon. Local rivals Sunderland beat Nottingham Forest 4–1 at the City Ground.

23 August 1996 – Under pressure Manchester City manager Alan Ball signs Arsenal striker Paul Dickov for £1million to prepare for a Division One promotion challenge.

24 August 1996 – Lincoln City manager John Beck is arrested by police in an investigation concerning Customs and Excise.

27 August 1996 – Alan Ball resigns as manager of Manchester City.

28 August 1996 – With his one-year ban from football now over, George Graham is reportedly due to be offered the Manchester City manager's job, 18 months after he was sacked by Arsenal for accepting illegal payments.

29 August 1996 – Dave Bassett, the Crystal Palace manager, is the latest name to be linked with the Manchester City job.

31 August 1996 – The first month of the league season ends with Sheffield Wednesday as Premier League leaders after winning their first three games of the season. Chelsea, Arsenal, Aston Villa and Manchester United complete the top five, following by newly promoted Sunderland in sixth place. Wimbledon prop up the top flight, with Blackburn Rovers and Coventry City completing the bottom three. In Division One, Stoke City lead the way, a point ahead of Barnsley in the early stages of the race for Premier League football. Norwich City, Tranmere Rovers, Bolton Wanderers and QPR complete the top six.

4 September 1996 –

  - – Ray Wilkins resigns after two years as player-manager of Queen's Park Rangers, who were relegated from the Premier League last season.
    - – Arsenal and Chelsea draw 3–3 in the league at Highbury. In another high scoring Premier League game, Middlesbrough beat West Ham United 4–1 at the Riverside Stadium.

7 September 1996 –

  - – A Saudi consortium is reported to be in the process of taking over Manchester City in a £70million deal.
    - – Middlesbrough's high scoring start to the season continues as they beat Coventry City 4–0 at home, with Fabrizio Ravanelli and Juninho both scoring twice. Wimbledon inflict the same scoreline on Everton at Selhurst Park.

9 September 1996 – Leeds United sack Howard Wilkinson, their manager since 1988, the day after they lost 4–0 at home to Manchester United in a Premier League game.

13 September 1996 – Caretaker manager Stewart Houston quits Arsenal, who are targeting Arsène Wenger as their new manager but are waiting to agree a compensation deal with Nagoya Grampus Eight for his services.

14 September 1996 – Alan Shearer faces his old club Blackburn Rovers for the first time since his transfer to Newcastle United, and scores a penalty in a 2–1 home win.

16 September 1996 – Stewart Houston is appointed manager of Queen's Park Rangers.

19 September 1996 – Dave Bassett rejects an offer to manage Manchester City.

20 September 1996 – In a reversal of roles, Bruce Rioch becomes Stewart Houston's assistant at Loftus Road.

21 September 1996 – Czech midfielder Patrik Berger scores twice as Liverpool demolish Chelsea 5–1 in the league at Anfield; he also scored twice in the previous weekend's 3–0 win at Leicester City.

28 September 1996 –

  - – Arsenal appoint 46-year-old Frenchman Arsène Wenger as their new manager.
    - – Middlesbrough's fine start to the season collapses as they are beaten 4–0 at Southampton, with Matt Le Tissier showing signs of a return to his old form by scoring twice.

29 September – Norwegian striker Ole Gunnar Solskjaer scores both of Manchester United's goals as they beat Tottenham Hotspur 2–0 in the league at Old Trafford.

30 September 1996 –

  - – Manchester United reject a £5million offer from Everton for Andy Cole, whose place in the first team has been placed under threat from strong performances by new signing Ole Gunnar Solskjaer.
    - – September ends with Liverpool as Premier League leaders, Arsenal second, Manchester United (defending champions) third, underdogs Wimbledon fourth, and last season's runners-up Newcastle United fifth. Blackburn Rovers, champions two seasons ago, are bottom of the Premier League having failed to win any of their opening eight games. Coventry City occupy second from bottom place, while Southampton occupy the final relegation place and Nottingham Forest and Leeds United occupy the two places directly above the drop zone. Bolton Wanderers are now top of Division One, one point ahead of Barnsley and two points ahead of Wolverhampton Wanderers. Norwich City, Stoke City and Crystal Palace complete the top six.

6 October 1996 – Steve Coppell is appointed manager of Manchester City following the resignation of Alan Ball.

12 October 1996 – David Beckham scores the only goal of the match as Manchester United defeat Liverpool 1–0 in the Premier League at Old Trafford.

14 October 1996 – Sheffield Wednesday sign Italian midfielder Benito Carbone from Inter Milan for a club record £3 million.

15 October 1996 – Southampton sign Dutch defender Ulrich van Gobbel from Galatasaray for £1.3 million.

17 October 1996 – West Ham United goalscoring legend Tony Cottee, who has lost his place in the first team this season, signs for Malaysian club Selangor for £750,000.

19 October 1996 – Wimbledon's recent run of fine form continues as they beat Chelsea 4–2 in the league at Stamford Bridge.

20 October 1996 – Newcastle United beat Manchester United 5–0 in a Premier League fixture, which ends the division's longest unbeaten start to the season.

22 October 1996 – Chelsea director Matthew Harding, 42, is killed with four other people in a helicopter crash in Cheshire on his journey home from the club's League Cup defeat against Bolton Wanderers.

25 October 1996 – Ray Harford resigns as manager of Blackburn Rovers, bottom of the FA Premier League just 18 months after being champions, and coach Tony Parkes takes over until the end of the season.

26 October 1996 – Manchester United endure another heavy defeat, this time a 6–3 crushing at Southampton in which Norwegian striker Egil Østenstad scores a hat-trick.

29 October 1996 – Everton pay a club record £5.75 million to Middlesbrough for Nick Barmby.

30 October 1996 – Manchester United, unbeaten since they first played in Europe 40 years ago, finally suffer a home defeat in a European fixture when they lost 1–0 at home to Fenerbahçe in their fourth group match of the UEFA Champions League.

31 October 1996 – Arsenal end their first month under Arsène Wenger's management as Premier League leaders on goal difference ahead of Newcastle United, while Wimbledon are close behind in third, Liverpool are fourth (with two games in hand over the top three) and Manchester United are now fifth after two successive hefty league defeats. Sheffield Wednesday's excellent start has ebbed away and they now occupy eighth place just two months after leading the league. Blackburn Rovers are still bottom of the table and winless after 11 games, while they and Coventry City are now joined by Nottingham Forest in the relegation zone after Southampton climbed to a secure 14th place with the 6–3 win over Manchester United playing a big part in their recent improvement. In Division One, Bolton Wanderers remain top of Division One, with the other automatic promotion place now occupied by Norwich City. The playoff places are occupied by Crystal Palace, Barnsley, Tranmere Rovers and Wolverhampton Wanderers.

2 November 1996 – Manchester United's two-year unbeaten Premier League home run is ended by a 2–1 defeat against Chelsea.

3 November 1996 – Blackburn Rovers achieve their first league win over the season in style by beating Liverpool 3–0 at Ewood Park, with two goals from a resurgent Chris Sutton. On the same day, Peter Beardsley also appears on the scoresheet twice – as Newcastle United beat local rivals Middlesbrough 3–1 to boost their own title challenge and push their opponents further towards the relegation zone.

5 November 1996 – Dutch striker Bryan Roy is put on the transfer list at £2 million by Premier League strugglers Nottingham Forest.

7 November 1996 – Tommy Lawton, the former Everton and England forward, dies of pneumonia at age 77.

8 November 1996 – Steve Coppell resigns after 33 days as manager of Manchester City. Chelsea sign Italy striker Gianfranco Zola from Parma for £4.5 million.

14 November 1996 – Robbie Fowler scores four times as Liverpool crush Middlesbrough 5–1 at Anfield.

16 November 1996 – Leicester City's sound return to the Premier League continues as they beat midlands rivals Aston Villa 3–1 in the league at Villa Park. Everton's flagging start to the season is given a much-needed boost as they thrash Southampton 7–1 at Goodison Park. Gary Speed scores a hat-trick, while Andrei Kanchelskis scores twice. Graham Stuart and Nick Barmby score the other goals. Manchester United's three-match losing streak in the league ends when a Nigel Winterburn own goal gives them a 1–0 win over Arsenal at Old Trafford.

20 November 1996 – Terry Venables, who quit as England manager last summer, accepts an offer to take charge of the Australia national football team, but insists that he will continue in his role as Portsmouth chairman.

21 November 1996 – Queen's Park Rangers pay £2.5 million (a record for a club outside the top flight) for Chelsea striker John Spencer.

22 November 1996 – Conference side Woking shock Division Two Millwall in the FA Cup third round replay at The Den which followed a 2–2 draw in the first game.

23 November 1996 – Coventry City pay Newcastle United £1 million for 20-year-old striker Darren Huckerby.

26 November 1996 – Another FA Cup first round replay upset sees Brighton & Hove Albion (currently bottom of Division Three only six seasons after they almost won promotion to the top flight) lose at home on penalties to non-league Sudbury Town after a 1–1 draw at the Goldstone Ground. However, Whitby Town are not so lucky as they crash to a Duane Darby double hat-trick in the 8–4 defeat to Hull City that followed a goalless draw in the original game.

30 November 1996 – Arsenal remain top of the league as November draws to a close, with Newcastle United, Liverpool, Wimbledon and Manchester United not far behind. Nottingham Forest are now bottom with still only one win from their opening 15 games, while Coventry City join them in the bottom three along with a Blackburn Rovers side who this month finally recorded their first two wins of the league campaign. A Middlesbrough side featuring some of the country's most expensively signed players are just above the relegation zone as midway point approaches during a season where they had been expected to challenge much higher in the table. Bolton Wanderers are still top of Division One, now accompanied in the automatic promotion places by Crystal Palace. Occupying the playoff zone are Barnsley, Norwich City, Sheffield United and Tranmere Rovers.

1 December 1996 – Ian Rush scores his first goal for Leeds United as they beat Chelsea 2–0 in the league at Elland Road.

2 December 1996 – Tottenham Hotspur purchase Norwegian striker Steffen Iversen from Rosenborg for £2.5 million.

3 December 1996 – Middlesbrough's slump continues as they lose 2–0 at home to Leicester City.

7 December 1996 – Woking's FA Cup adventure continues with another giant-killing feat, this time a 2–0 win against Cambridge United at the Abbey Stadium. On the same day, Stevenage Borough eliminate Leyton Orient from the competition with a 2–1 win at Brisbane Road.

11 December 1996 – John Scales turns his back on Leeds United after looking set to return to the club where he began his career over a decade ago, and leaves Liverpool for Tottenham Hotspur in a £2.6 million deal.

14 December 1996 – Robbie Fowler scores four goals for Liverpool as they beat Middlesbrough 5–1 in the league at Anfield.

19 December 1996 – Frank Clark steps down after three-and-a-half years as manager of Nottingham Forest, with 34-year-old defender Stuart Pearce being appointed player-manager on a temporary basis.

20 December 1996 – Middlesbrough cancel their Premier League fixture at Blackburn Rovers tomorrow, after manager Bryan Robson insisted he could not field a team, as 23 of his playing staff have been hit by a virus.

22 December 1996 – Stuart Pearce brings former Nottingham Forest striker Nigel Clough back to the City Ground on loan from Manchester City, more than three years after he left the club for Liverpool.

23 December 1996 – Division Two strugglers Notts County sack joint managers Steve Thompson and Colin Murphy.

24 December 1996 – Middlesbrough are charged with bringing the game into disrepute over their cancelled fixture.

26 December 1996 – The key Boxing Day drama sees Gianfranco Zola score both of Chelsea's goals in a 2–0 away win over Aston Villa, Gordon Strachan lead Coventry City to a 3–1 away win over his old club Leeds United, and Manchester United boost their title hopes and deepen their opposition's relegation worries with a 4–0 win at Nottingham Forest.

28 December 1996 – Wimbledon continue to defy the odds and challenge for a place in Europe with a 3–1 away win over Everton. Newcastle United continue to push for the title with a 7–1 home win over Tottenham Hotspur.

29 December 1996 –

  - – 11 days after leaving Nottingham Forest, Frank Clark is named as manager of Manchester City.
    - – Liverpool remain top of the Premier League with a 1–0 win at Southampton, with a late goal from John Barnes ensuring that they top a division which they were last champions of in 1990.

31 December 1996 – 1996 draws to a close with Liverpool now leading the Premier League, while a mere five points separate the next six highest clubs – Manchester United, Arsenal, Wimbledon, Newcastle United, Aston Villa and Chelsea. Nottingham Forest are still bottom with a mere two wins so far this season, while Blackburn Rovers remain in the drop zone along with Southampton who have slipped into the bottom three that has been vacated by an improving Coventry City side. Bolton Wanderers are still top of Division One, but Barnsley have cut their lead to just two points. Sheffield United, Wolverhampton Wanderers, Crystal Palace and an Oxford United side searching for a second successive promotion complete the top six. Manchester City, who had been expected to feature highly in this season's promotion race, are now one point and one place above the relegation zone.

1 January 1997 – Middlesbrough sign Slovakian midfielder Vladimír Kinder from Slovan Bratislava for £1 million.

5 January 1997 – Newcastle United are rocked by the resignation of manager Kevin Keegan, who explained, "I feel I have taken this club as far as I can."

8 January 1997 – The 1995 Football League Cup Final participants (Liverpool and Bolton Wanderers) are eliminated from the same tournament at the quarter-final stage by Middlesbrough and Wimbledon respectively. This is the furthest the Dons have ever progressed in the League Cup.

11 January 1997 – Blackburn Rovers continue their revival with a 4–0 home win over Coventry City. Middlesbrough's relegation worries are deepened with a 1–0 home defeat to Southampton, and later this week their survival battle could be toughened by a points deduction.

13 January 1997 – York City, who knocked Everton out of the League Cup this season and Manchester United last season, later lost to Hednesford Town in a 1-0 FA Cup loss at Keys Park.

14 January 1997 – Middlesbrough, bottom of the Premier League, are deducted three points for cancelling their fixture at Blackburn Rovers last month. They are also fined £50,000. Striker Fabrizio Ravanelli claims that his club will now "almost certainly" be relegated. Ravanelli's fellow countryman Gianluca Festa joins Middlesbrough from Inter Milan on the same day for £2.7 million.

15 January 1997 – Kenny Dalglish is named as Newcastle United's new manager.

16 January 1997 – Leicester City pay £1.6 million for Oxford United's 28-year-old defender Matt Elliott.

18 January 1997 – Kenny Dalglish begins his reign as Newcastle United manager with a 2–2 draw at Southampton, costing his own side two valuable points as he looks to become the first manager to win the English league title with three clubs, while a point for Southampton gives their survival battle a boost.

25 January 1997 – A major upset in the FA Cup third round replay sees Wrexham win 1–0 against West Ham United at Upton Park after drawing the first match 1–1 at the Racecourse Ground, sparking a pitch invasion. However, Hednesford Town's luck finally runs out when they lose 3–2 to Middlesbrough in the fourth round clash at the Riverside Stadium, while a late equaliser for Wimbledon forces a replay for Manchester United.

26 January 1997 – Liverpool's bid for a second double is ended as they are defeated 4–2 by Chelsea in the fourth round replay at Stamford Bridge.

27 January 1997 - Liverpool are beaten by both Rangers and Milan in a six-a-side tournament at the Amsterdam Arena; the Glasgow club's England international Paul Gascoigne limps out of the same competition, putting into doubt his participation in the national side's Wembley match with Italy in February.

29 January 1997 –

  - – Everton sell winger Andrei Kanchelskis to Fiorentina for £8 million, the most expensive player to be sold to a foreign club by any British club.
    - – After going a goal down, Manchester United defeat Wimbledon 2–1 at Old Trafford to go top of the Premier League – they will stay there for the rest of the season. Newcastle United keep up their challenge with a 4–1 win over an underperforming Everton.

30 January 1997 – Coventry City boost their defence with the acquisition of Gary Breen from Birmingham City for £2.5million.

31 January 1997 – January ends with Manchester United now top of the Premier League and unbeaten in it since early November. Arsenal, Liverpool and Newcastle United are their nearest contenders, while Wimbledon have endured a slight setback but have two games in hand to muscle in on the top four. Middlesbrough's three-point deduction for cancelling a league fixture in December leaves them bottom of the table, while caretaker-manager Stuart Pearce has guided Nottingham Forest out of the drop zone with three wins this month, Southampton remain in the bottom three, and Blackburn Rovers have finally climbed clear of the drop zone at the expense of West Ham United. Bolton Wanderers have extended their lead at the top of Division One to 11 points, their nearest challengers being Sheffield United and Barnsley. The top six is completed by Wolverhampton Wanderers, Norwich City and Stoke City.

2 February 1997 – Alan Shearer scores a hat-trick as Newcastle United beat Leicester City 4–3 at home in the league.

4 February 1997 – Manchester United lose their defence of the FA Cup with a 1–0 fourth round replay defeat to Wimbledon at Selhurst Park. Marcus Gayle gave Wimbledon the lead, and Peter Schmeichel looked to have saved United with a last-minute goal, but it was ruled offside. This means that United will not be playing in the FA Cup final for the first time since 1993.

6 February 1997 – West Ham United pay a club record £2.3million for Newcastle United striker Paul Kitson.

10 February 1997 – Leicester City defender Neil Lewis is sentenced to six months in prison for affray after being found guilty of attacking a man with a bottle in a nightclub brawl.

12 February 1997 – Blackburn Rovers sign OB Odense and Denmark striker Per Pedersen for £2.5million.

15 February 1997 – The latest FA Cup upset sees Premier League Nottingham Forest eliminated 1–0 by Division Two Chesterfield at Saltergate, while on the same day fellow Premier League club Leeds United suffer a 3–2 embarrassment at home to Division One Portsmouth, and Division One Birmingham City's FA Cup hopes are ended with a 3–1 home defeat by Division Two surprise package Wrexham.

22 February 1997 –

  - – Middlesbrough sign Bradford City and Australia goalkeeper Mark Schwarzer for £1.5million.
    - – Ian Marshall scores a hat-trick as Leicester City beat local rivals Derby County 4–2 in the league at Filbert Street.

23 February 1997 – Wimbledon pull of their second surprise win of the month when a Vinnie Jones goal gives them a 1–0 league win over Arsenal at Highbury.

27 February 1997 – Dave Bassett leaves Crystal Palace to take over as manager at Nottingham Forest.

28 February 1997 – Steve Coppell is appointed as Crystal Palace manager for the third time since 1984. February ends with Manchester United still top of the Premier League and Liverpool now their nearest contenders, while Newcastle United, Arsenal and Aston Villa complete the top five. The bottom three main unchanged from the last month-end. Bolton Wanderers remain top of Division One, their nearest rivals now being Wolverhampton Wanderers who are 10 points behind them in second place. The top six is completed by Barnsley, Sheffield United, Norwich City and Crystal Palace.

1 March 1997 – Newcastle United's title hopes are hit by an unexpected blow when they lose 1–0 at home to Southampton.

4 March 1997 – Norwegian striker Steffen Iversen scores a hat-trick as Tottenham Hotspur beat relegation-threatened Sunderland 4–0 at Roker Park.

5 March 1997 – Middlesbrough's survival hopes are given a major boost when they beat Derby County 6–1 at the Riverside Stadium, with Fabrizio Ravanelli scoring a hat-trick. Nottingham Forest's survival hopes are dented when they lose 3–0 at home Sheffield Wednesday, whose hopes of a UEFA Cup place are kept very much alive by the result.

8 March 1997 – Middlesbrough move closer to a first-ever FA Cup final by winning 2–0 at Derby County in the quarter-final. Manchester United's four-month unbeaten run in the lead ends in a surprise 2–1 defeat against Sunderland at Roker Park.

9 March 1997 – In a rare occurrence of an FA Cup quarter-final being contested between two third-tier clubs, Chesterfield run out 1–0 winners over Wrexham at Saltergate. On the same day, Wimbledon move closer to FA Cup glory by winning 2–0 at Sheffield Wednesday, while the end is in sight for Chelsea's 26-year trophy drought as they crush Portsmouth 4–1 at Fratton Park.

10 March 1997 – Premier League strugglers Nottingham Forest sign Dutch striker Pierre Van Hooijdonk from Celtic for a club record £4.5million. In the title race, Liverpool beat Newcastle United 4–3 at Anfield.

12 March 1997 – Recently signed striker Paul Kitson scores twice as West Ham United boost their survival bid with a 3–2 home win over Chelsea.

15 March 1997 – Kevin Gallacher scores a hat-trick in Blackburn's 3–1 home league win over Wimbledon. Middlesbrough continue to push for survival with a 3–1 away win over Leicester City.

16 March 1997 – Sunderland's survival hopes are knocked by a 6–2 defeat at Chelsea.

18 March 1997 - Newcastle are knocked out of the UEFA Cup at the quarter-final stage by AS Monaco FC, who join Inter Milan, CD Tenerife and FC Schalke 04 in the semi-finals. In the one English top-flight match, Stan Lazaridis scores a last-minute equalizer for West Ham United, cancelling out Mick Harford's first goal of the season.

19 March 1997 – Middlesbrough continue their fightback with a 2–1 home win over Blackburn.

22 March 1997 – John Hartson is on the scoresheet twice for West Ham United in a relegation crunch win at Coventry City. Middlesbrough make it four league wins in a row as a Juninho goal gives them a 1–0 home win over Chelsea. Another relegation crunch game sees Sunderland and Nottingham Forest battle out a 1–1 draw at Roker Park.

26 March 1997 – Middlesbrough fail in an appeal to restore 3 points that were docked in early January as penalty for failing to fulfil a fixture against Blackburn Rovers.

27 March 1997 – West Ham United buy Northern Ireland midfielder Steve Lomas from Manchester City for £1.6million.

31 March 1997 – Manchester United continue to lead the Premier League for third month-end running, with Liverpool still their nearest challengers. Southampton are now bottom of the Premier League, while Nottingham Forest have slipped back into the drop zone along with Coventry City. Blackburn Rovers continue to move closer to what once seemed like an almost impossible survival as they stand 12th with a six-point advantage over the bottom three and a game in hand. Bolton Wanderers are now just one point away from promotion at the top of Division One, with Barnsley now in second place and well on course for top-division football for the first time in their 101-year history. Wolverhampton Wanderers, Sheffield United, Crystal Palace and surprise promotion contenders Port Vale occupy the playoff zone.

5 April 1997 – Leaders Manchester United suffer a surprise 3–2 home defeat by Derby County.

6 April 1997 – Liverpool's title bid takes a surprise setback when they lose 2–1 at home to relegation battlers Coventry City.

9 April 1997 – Coventry City's survival battle continues with another win over a much stronger opposition – this time Chelsea, who find themselves on the receiving end of a 3–1 defeat at Highfield Road.

13 April 1997 –

  - – Chelsea beat Wimbledon 3–0 in the FA Cup semi-final at Highbury to reach the FA Cup final. In the other FA Cup semi-final between Middlesbrough and Chesterfield, two early Chesterfield goals look to have put them on course to become the first third-tier side to reach a final, but Middlesbrough fight back to claim a 3–3 draw and force a replay.
    - – Liverpool keep their title hopes alive with a 2–1 win over Sunderland at Roker Park, a result which does the hosts no favours in their battle against relegation.

16 April 1997 – Leicester City beat Middlesbrough 1–0 in the League Cup final replay at Hillsborough thanks to a Steve Claridge goal.

19 April 1997 – Manchester United take a huge step towards title glory with a 3–1 away win over their main rivals Liverpool, in which defender Gary Pallister scores twice. Newcastle keep their title challenge alive with a 3–1 home win over Derby County, but Arsenal do themselves no favours as they can only manage a 1–1 draw at home to Blackburn. Southampton and Coventry City draw 2–2 in a relegation crunch game at The Dell.

21 April 1997 – Chelsea agree a £2.25million fee with Anderlecht for 19-year-old Nigerian defender Celestine Babayaro.

22 April 1997 – Middlesbrough reach their first-ever FA Cup final thanks to a 2–0 win in the semi-final replay against Division Two side Chesterfield.

25 April 1997 – In the last ever game at Burnden Park, Division One champions Bolton Wanderers beat Charlton Athletic 4–1.

26 April 1997– Barnsley are promoted to the Premier League for the first time after defeating Bradford City 2–0 at Oakwell.

30 April 1997 – Manchester United look assured of their fourth league title in five seasons, as they finish April top of the league by a five-point margin over Arsenal and Liverpool – and with a game in hand. Newcastle United's challenge is all but over, while Aston Villa's hopes are now completely dead, and the midlanders are now facing a threat of being pipped to even a UEFA Cup place – by Sheffield Wednesday. The relegation battle is still wide open, with West Ham United, Middlesbrough and Nottingham Forest occupying the bottom three, and several other teams also fighting to avoid the drop. In Division One, Bolton Wanderers are established as champions with 97 points and 98 goals – 17 points ahead of their nearest rivals Barnsley. Wolverhampton Wanderers, Ipswich Town, Sheffield United and Crystal Palace will contest the playoffs.

3 May 1997 – Sunderland play their last game at Roker Park after 99 years and go out on a high by beating Everton 3–0, but are still in danger of Premier League relegation. Their local rivals Newcastle United remain in contention for the league title with a 1–0 win at Arsenal – a result which rules the North Londoners out of the title race. Liverpool remain in it with a 2–1 home win over Tottenham. Paul Kitson ensures West Ham's survival with a hat-trick in their 5–1 home win over Sheffield Wednesday, whose UEFA Cup hopes are ended by the result. Coventry City, meanwhile, are left needing a miracle to save their 30-year tenure in the top flight due to a 2–1 home defeat by Derby County.

4 May 1997 – Stoke City beat West Bromwich Albion 2–1 in their last game at the Victoria Ground, their home for a national record of 119 years.

On 5 May 1997, Manchester United drew 3–3 with Middlesbrough at Old Trafford.

6 May 1997 – Newcastle's goalless draw at West Ham and Liverpool's 2–1 defeat at Wimbledon means that Manchester United are Premier League champions for the fourth time in five seasons. In Liverpool's defeat, Michael Owen scores the consolation goal in only his second appearance for the club, making him the club's youngest ever league goalscorer at the age of 17 years and 144 days.

7 May 1997 - A late Matt Elliott goal for Leicester three points from Sheffield Wednesday, making the East Midlands club safe from relegation.

11 May 1997 – On a dramatic final day of the Premier League season, Coventry City pull off a miracle survival act by beating Tottenham Hotspur 2–1 at White Hart Lane. Middlesbrough – who would have survived at the expense of Coventry had it not been for their points deduction – go down after being held to a 1–1 draw by Leeds United at Elland Road. Sunderland lose 1–0 to Wimbledon at Selhurst Park, but their fans are left waiting after the final whistle to hear whether their team have survived; when the news comes through that Coventry have won, it is confirmed that Sunderland are relegated.

12 May 1997 – Aston Villa pay a club record £7 million for Liverpool striker Stan Collymore.

14 May 1997 – Everton sign Croatian defender Slaven Bilić from West Ham United for £4.5million.

17 May 1997 – Chelsea end their 26-year wait for a major trophy, and Ruud Gullit becomes the first foreign manager to win one, with a 2–0 win over Middlesbrough in the FA Cup final.

18 May 1997 – Manchester United are left shocked after their iconic striker Eric Cantona announces his retirement from football six days before his 31st birthday. Cantona, who won four league titles and two FA Cups in five seasons at the club, explained that he had always intended to retire while still at the top.

11 June 1997 – Chelsea sign Dutch goalkeeper Ed de Goey from Feyenoord for £2.25 million.

13 June 1997 – Barnsley, who have been promoted to the Premier League for the first time, pay a club record £1.5million for Macedonian striker Georgi Hristov from Partizan.

17 June 1997 – Arsenal pay a club record £7million for Ajax and Dutch winger Marc Overmars.

23 June 1997 – Former Everton striker Andy Gray rejects an offer to return to the club as manager, preferring to stay in his current role as a football pundit with Sky Sports.

24 June 1997 – The Premier League's media consultants recommend that the league creates its own television channel by 2001 if it wants to maximise television revenue, claiming that it could generate twice as much revenue this way than the current deal with Sky Sports is raising for them.

25 June 1997 – Howard Kendall leaves Sheffield United to take charge of Everton for the third time since 1981.

27 June 1997 – Manchester United sign Teddy Sheringham from Tottenham for £3.5million.

== Women's football ==
=== Women's Premier League ===
==== National Division ====
Pos	Team	Pld	W	D	L	GF	GA	GD	Pts	Qualification or relegation
1	Arsenal (C)	18	16	1	1	65	9	+56	49	
2	Doncaster Belles	18	13	2	3	44	15	+29	41	
3	Croydon	18	9	4	5	39	26	+13	31	
4	Liverpool	18	9	3	6	30	16	+14	30	
5	Millwall Lionesses	18	7	6	5	20	19	+1	27	
6	Everton	18	8	3	7	36	36	0	27	
7	Wembley	18	6	4	8	26	27	−1	22	
8	Tranmere Rovers	18	3	3	12	23	48	−25	12	
9	Southampton Saints (R)	18	3	0	15	16	61	−45	9	Relegation to the Southern Division
10	Ilkeston Town (R)	18	1	4	13	14	56	−42	7	Relegation to the Northern Division

Source: FA WPL
(C) Champions; (R) Relegated

==== Northern Division ====
Pos	Team	Pld	W	D	L	GF	GA	GD	Pts	Promotion or relegation
1	Bradford City (C, P)	16	15	0	1	56	13	+43	45	Promotion to the National Division
2	Aston Villa	16	12	1	3	50	15	+35	37	
3	Blyth Spartans Kestrels	16	9	2	5	40	25	+15	29	
4	Huddersfield Town	16	8	3	5	37	32	+5	27	
5	Wolverhampton Wanderers	16	7	1	8	30	29	+1	22	
6	Sheffield Wednesday	16	4	4	8	25	36	−11	16	
7	Garswood Saints	16	3	5	8	26	29	−3	14	
8	Stourport Swifts	16	3	2	11	22	60	−38	11	
9	Notts County	16	0	4	12	21	68	−47	4	
10	Bronte (X)	0	0	0	0	0	0	0	0	Club dissolved in November. All results expunged for this season.

Source: WPL
(C) Champions; (P) Promoted; (X) ?

==== Southern Division ====
Pos	Team	Pld	W	D	L	GF	GA	GD	Pts	Promotion or relegation
1	Berkhamsted Town (C, P)	18	14	2	2	57	16	+41	44	Promotion to the National Division
2	Brighton & Hove Albion	18	13	2	3	59	33	+26	41	
3	Whitehawk	18	12	1	5	39	17	+22	37	
4	Wimbledon	18	10	2	6	65	28	+37	32	
5	Three Bridges	18	7	5	6	36	27	+9	26	
6	Langford	18	7	5	6	28	33	−5	26	
7	Ipswich Town	18	5	4	9	24	26	−2	19	
8	Leyton Orient	18	3	4	11	27	50	−23	13	
9	Town & County Diamonds	18	2	3	13	18	65	−47	9	
10	Oxford United (R)	18	2	2	14	17	75	−58	8	Relegation

Source: FA WPL
(C) Champions; (P) Promoted; (R) Relegated

=== FA Women's Cup ===
==== Final ====
4 May 1997
15:00 BST

Millwall Lionesses	1–0	Wembley
Waller 51'	Report

Upton Park, London
Attendance: 3,015
Referee: Clive Wilkes (Gloucestershire)

== Famous debutants ==
- 11 January 1997: Jamie Carragher, 18-year-old defender, makes his debut for Liverpool in their 0–0 home draw with West Ham United in the Premier League.
- 12 April 1997: Michael Ball, 17-year-old defender, makes his debut for Everton in their 1–0 home win over Tottenham Hotspur in the Premier League.
- 6 May 1997: Michael Owen, 17-year-old striker, scores on his debut for Liverpool in their 2–1 league defeat by Wimbledon at Selhurst Park.

== Retirements ==
7 November 1996: Dave Busst, 29-year-old central defender who suffered a compound leg fracture while playing for Coventry City against Manchester United seven months ago, retires on medical advice after being told that he is unlikely ever to recover to full fitness despite having had 26 operations.

28 April 1997: Peter Shilton, 47-year-old goalkeeper who four months earlier became the first player to reach 1,000 league appearances in English football, ends his professional career after being given a free transfer by Leyton Orient.

11 May 1997: Gordon Strachan, 40-year-old Coventry City player-manager, retires as a player after becoming the oldest outfield player to appear in the Premier League.

18 May 1997: Eric Cantona, iconic Manchester United, shocks football by announcing his retirement as a player six days before his 31st birthday.

== Deaths ==
- 4 July 1996 – Vic Lambden, 70, scored 117 league goals for Bristol Rovers between 1946 and 1955 in partnership with Geoff Bradford, who died 18 months before him.
- 24 July 1996 – Jock Wallace, 60, is best remembered for his achievements in Scotland during two spells as manager of Rangers, but spent part of his career in England, as a goalkeeper first with Workington and non-league Ashton United in the early 1950s and then with 69 league appearances between the sticks for West Bromwich Albion in the early 1960s. Then managed Leicester City between 1978 and 1982, during which time they won the Second Division title and promotion to the First Division, and future England striker Gary Lineker broke into Leicester's first team. His final job in England was a brief spell at Colchester United in 1989.
- 20 August 1996 – Les Hart, 79, played 280 league games at right-back for his only club Bury between 1936 and 1953, spending most of his time at Gigg Lane as captain. Became first team coach after retiring as a player, remaining with the club as a physiotherapist until 1980 when he ended 44 years of service at the club, which had also included the 1969–70 season as manager.
- 22 October 1996 – Matthew Harding, 42, vice chairman of Chelsea, died in a helicopter crash with four other people in Cheshire as they flew home from a game at Bolton.
- 6 November 1996 – Tommy Lawton, 77, who scored 22 times in 23 games for England between the late 1930s and early 1950s. At club level turned out for Everton, Chelsea and Notts County.
- 24 January 1997 – Roy Sproson, 66, who died of cancer, spent his whole career as a centre-half with Port Vale and played 837 times for them. After retiring as a player in 1972, he later served the club as coach and manager.
- 20 February 1997 – Stan Pearson, 78, who died in February 1997, made more than 300 league appearances for Manchester United either side of the second world war. The forward also represented England, Bury and Chester, where he later became manager.
- 23 April 1997– Denis Compton, 78, who played first class cricket and football, played 54 times in the league as a left-winger for Arsenal between 1936 and 1950, winning a league title and FA Cup as well as turning out 12 times for England in wartime internationals.
