= 1997–98 Middlesbrough F.C. season =

Middlesbrough
1997–98 season
- Chairman: Steve Gibson
- Manager: Bryan Robson
- Stadium: Riverside Stadium
- First Division: 2nd (promoted)
- FA Cup: Fourth round
- League Cup: Runners-up
- Top goalscorer: League: Beck (14); All: Merson (16)
- Average home league attendance: 29,994

During the 1997–98 English football season, Middlesbrough F.C. competed in the Football League First Division.

== Season summary ==
Middlesbrough were promoted to the Premier League, also reaching the League Cup final, where the club lost its third domestic cup final in a year. Just reaching the final was a huge success, though, with the club not playing in the top flight and having lost international star players Fabrizio Ravanelli and Juninho following relegation.

The season also saw the arrivals of well-known players such as Paul Gascoigne from Rangers, Marco Branca from Inter Milan and Paul Merson from Arsenal, with Boro bucking the trend of players only being attracted by top-flight clubs.

== Final league table ==
Pos	Team	Pld	W	D	L	GF	GA	GD	Pts	Qualification or relegation
1	Nottingham Forest (C, P)	46	28	10	8	82	42	+40	94	Promotion to the Premier League
2	Middlesbrough (P)	46	27	10	9	77	41	+36	91	Promotion to the Premier League
3	Sunderland	46	26	12	8	86	50	+36	90	Qualification for the First Division play-offs
4	Charlton Athletic (O, P)	46	26	10	10	80	49	+31	88	Qualification for the First Division play-offs
5	Ipswich Town	46	23	14	9	77	43	+34	83	Qualification for the First Division play-offs

Source: Statto.com
Rules for classification: 1) Points; 2) Goals scored; 3) Goal difference
(C) Champions; (O) Play-off winners; (P) Promoted

== Results ==
Middlesbrough's score comes first

=== Legend ===
Win	Draw	Loss

=== Football League First Division ===
Date	Opponent	Venue	Result	Attendance	Scorers
9 August 1997	Charlton Athletic	H	2–1	29,414	Festa, Ravanelli
23 August 1997	Stoke City	H	0–1	30,122	
30 August 1997	Tranmere Rovers	A	2–0	12,095	Mustoe, Beck
2 September 1997	Stockport County	A	1–1	8,257	Merson
13 September 1997	Bradford City	A	2–2	17,767	Kinder, Ormerod
20 September 1997	Birmingham City	H	3–1	30,125	Kinder, Beck, Emerson
28 September 1997	Sunderland	A	2–1	35,384	Emerson, Mustoe
5 October 1997	Sheffield United	H	1–2	30,000	Beck
18 October 1997	Crewe Alexandra	A	1–1	5,759	Townsend
21 October 1997	Oxford United	A	4–1	8,306	Emerson, Mustoe, Fleming, Merson
25 October 1997	Port Vale	H	2–1	30,096	Merson (2 pens)
28 October 1997	Huddersfield Town	H	3–0	29,965	Merson, Beck (2)
1 November 1997	Wolverhampton Wanderers	A	0–1	26,896	
5 November 1997	Portsmouth	H	1–1	29,724	Townsend
8 November 1997	Queens Park Rangers	H	3–0	30,067	Beck, Merson, Ormerod
15 November 1997	Norwich City	A	3–1	16,011	Beck, Merson, Ormerod
22 November 1997	Swindon Town	A	2–1	15,228	Merson, Emerson
26 November 1997	Nottingham Forest	H	0–0	30,143	
29 November 1997	West Bromwich Albion	H	1–0	30,164	Beck
2 December 1997	Ipswich Town	A	1–1	13,619	Merson
6 December 1997	Bury	A	1–0	8,016	Beck
13 December 1997	Reading	H	4–0	29,876	Hignett (2), Beck (2)
20 December 1997	Manchester City	A	0–2	28,097	
26 December 1997	Huddersfield Town	A	1–0	18,820	Gray (own goal)
28 December 1997	Stockport County	H	3–1	30,166	Hignett, Beck (2)
10 January 1998	Charlton Athletic	A	0–3	15,742	
17 January 1998	Ipswich Town	H	1–1	30,081	Pearson
1 February 1998	Stoke City	A	2–1	13,242	Pearson, Moreno
4 February 1998	Tranmere Rovers	H	3–0	29,540	Hignett, Merson (2)
7 February 1998	Birmingham City	A	1–1	20,639	Festa
14 February 1998	Bradford City	H	1–0	30,165	Hignett
21 February 1998	Sunderland	H	3–1	30,227	Branca (2), Armstrong
25 February 1998	Crewe Alexandra	H	1–0	29,936	Maddison
1 March 1998	Nottingham Forest	A	0–4	25,286	
4 March 1998	Queens Park Rangers	A	0–5	11,580	
11 March 1998	Swindon Town	H	6–0	29,581	Branca (2), Maddison (2), Armstrong (2)
14 March 1998	Portsmouth	A	0–0	17,003	
22 March 1998	Norwich City	H	3–0	30,040	Maddison, Armstrong, Beck
4 April 1998	West Bromwich Albion	A	1–2	20,620	Branca
7 April 1998	Sheffield United	A	0–1	18,421	
11 April 1998	Bury	H	4–0	30,218	Ricard, Branca (3)
13 April 1998	Reading	A	1–0	14,501	Branca
17 April 1998	Manchester City	H	1–0	30,182	Armstrong
24 April 1998	Port Vale	A	1–0	12,096	Merson
29 April 1998	Wolverhampton Wanderers	H	1–1	29,878	Ricard
3 May 1998	Oxford United	H	4–1	30,228	Armstrong (2), Hignett (2)

=== FA Cup ===
Round	Date	Opponent	Venue	Result	Attendance	Goalscorers
R3	3 January 1998	Queens Park Rangers	A	2–2	13,379	Hignett, Mustoe
R3R	13 January 1998	Queens Park Rangers	H	2–0	21,817	Campbell, Mustoe
R4	24 January 1998	Arsenal	H	1–2	28,264	Merson

=== League Cup ===
Round	Date	Opponent	Venue	Result	Attendance	Goalscorers
R2 First Leg	16 September 1997	Barnet	H	1–0	9,611	Freestone
R2 Second Leg	23 September 1997	Barnet	A	2–0 (won 3–0 on agg)	3,968	Beck, Merson (pen)
R3	15 October 1997	Sunderland	H	2–0	26,451	Campbell, Hignett
R4	18 November 1997	Bolton Wanderers	H	2–1 (a.e.t.)	22,801	Summerbell, Hignett
R5	6 January 1998	Reading	A	1–0	13,072	Hignett
SF 1st Leg	27 January 1998	Liverpool	A	1–2	33,438	Merson
SF 2nd Leg	18 February 1998	Liverpool	H	2–0 (won 3–2 on agg)	29,828	Merson (pen), Branca
F	29 March 1998	Chelsea	N	0–2	77,698	

== Squad ==
Note: Flags indicate national team as defined under FIFA eligibility rules; some limited exceptions apply. Players may hold more than one non-FIFA nationality.

No.	Pos.	Nation	Player
-	GK	AUS	Mark Schwarzer
-	GK	ENG	Ben Roberts
-	GK	ENG	Marlon Beresford
-	GK	WAL	Andy Dibble
-	DF	ITA	Gianluca Festa
-	DF	ENG	Steve Vickers
-	DF	IRL	Curtis Fleming
-	DF	ENG	Nigel Pearson
-	DF	SVK	Vladimír Kinder
-	DF	ENG	Craig Harrison
-	DF	SCO	Derek Whyte
-	DF	ENG	Steve Baker
-	DF	ENG	Craig Liddle
-	DF	SCO	Robbie Stockdale
-	DF	IRL	Jason Gavin
-	DF	ENG	Alan White
-	MF	ENG	Paul Merson
-	MF	IRL	Andy Townsend
-	MF	ENG	Robbie Mustoe
-	MF	BRA	Emerson
-	MF	ENG	Neil Maddison
-	MF	ENG	Michael Thomas

No.	Pos.	Nation	Player
-	MF	ENG	Anthony Ormerod
-	MF	ENG	Phil Stamp
-	MF	ENG	Paul Gascoigne
-	MF	ENG	Mark Summerbell
-	MF	IRL	Alan Moore
-	MF	WAL	Clayton Blackmore
-	MF	POR	Fabio Moreira
-	MF	IRL	Ronnie O'Brien
-	MF	IRL	Micky Cummins
-	MF	ENG	Paul Connor
-	MF	ENG	Andrew Swalwell
-	MF	IRL	John O'Loughlin
-	FW	DEN	Mikkel Beck
-	FW	ENG	Craig Hignett
-	FW	ITA	Marco Branca
-	FW	ENG	Alun Armstrong
-	FW	ENG	Andy Campbell
-	FW	COL	Hámilton Ricard
-	FW	ITA	Fabrizio Ravanelli
-	FW	BOL	Jaime Moreno
-	FW	ENG	Chris Freestone
-	FW	ENG	Kris Trevor
