= 1997 FA Women's Cup final =

1997 FA Women's Cup Final
- Event: 1996–97 FA Women's Cup
| Millwall Lionesses | Wembley |
| 1 | 0 |
- Date: 4 May 1997
- Venue: Upton Park, London
- Player of the Match: Carol Harwood (Wembley)
- Referee: Clive Wilkes (Gloucestershire)
- Attendance: 3,015

The 1997 FA Women's Cup Final was the 27th final of the FA Women's Cup, England's primary cup competition for women's football teams. The showpiece event was the fourth to be played directly under the auspices of the Football Association (FA) and was known as the UK Living FA Women's Cup Final for sponsorship reasons. Millwall Lionesses and Wembley contested the match at West Ham United's Upton Park in London on 4 May 1997. Millwall Lionesses made their second final appearance, after winning the trophy in 1991 with a 1–0 win over Doncaster Belles at Prenton Park. Wembley appeared in the final for the first time, having won the previous season's FA Women's Premier League Cup competition.

As FA Women's Premier League National Division clubs, both teams entered the competition at the fourth round stage. Millwall Lionesses beat Chelsea (3–0), Doncaster Belles (3–0), Aston Villa (4–1, after extra time) and Croydon (1–1, 3–1 on penalties) to reach the final. Wembley needed extra time in all three games to defeat Tranmere Rovers (2–1), Preston Rangers (1–0) and Berkhamsted Town (3–1) to reach a semi final with Arsenal. Their subsequent 1–0 victory over Arsenal at Borehamwood was considered a major upset.

== Background ==
Millwall Lionesses won the Cup for the first time in 1991, when it was run under the auspices of the Women's Football Association. After their 1–0 final victory over Doncaster Belles, the winning squad broke up and players moved to rival clubs. Several players including future England manager Hope Powell founded a new club called Bromley Borough, which became Croydon then Charlton Athletic.

Only Julie Fletcher, at 16 the youngest member of the 1991 squad, and Lou Waller, employed by parent–club Millwall as a community officer, remained with the team. In Waller's words: "We had to shunt all the teams up. The reserves became the seniors, the juniors became the reserves." By 1997 Millwall Lionesses' emphasis on youth development had produced international calibre players such as Mary Phillip, Katie Chapman, Danielle Murphy and Carly Hunt. England's first–choice goalkeeper Pauline Cope had also returned to the club from Arsenal. In March 1997 Millwall Lionesses defeated Everton in the final of the FA Women's Premier League Cup.

Manager John Jones had taken over District Line LFC in 1982 and led them to a series of promotions. In 1993 they were promoted to the FA Women's Premier League National Division and tied up with Wembley FC to enter the top division. Part of the deal was a merger with Pinner Park Girls FC, which meant that Wembley inherited Pinner Park's Kelly Smith.

As a former Physical Training Instructor in the Royal Navy, Jones ensured his team were strong and fit. He favoured an unorthodox 3–2–3–2 formation which accommodated a blend of promising youngsters and experienced campaigners such as Naz Ball. Wembley's progress culminated in a shock FA Women's Premier League Cup win over Doncaster Belles in March 1996.

Jones was angry when his players subsequently began to join rival clubs, attributing their departure to "a little bit of, shall we say, greed." Since the win over Doncaster Belles, three players had moved to Arsenal (Smith, Kim Jerray-Silver and goalkeeper Sarah Reed) and another three to final opponents Millwall Lionesses (Sally Ede, Pam Bedzrah and Justine Lorton).

== Match ==
=== Summary ===
Watched by a crowd of 3,015, Millwall Lionesses won the match 1–0, with a winning goal early in the second half from Lou Waller. Justine Lorton, who had signed from Wembley the previous summer, delivered a corner kick which was turned in at the near post by Waller, a survivor of Millwall Lionesses' 1991 Cup win. In a close contest, Wembley's defence reportedly played extremely well but their veteran strike–force were unable to threaten Pauline Cope in the Millwall Lionesses goal.

After the match, victorious Millwall Lionesses players sang "No one likes us, we don't care" with their supporters. They also sang "How Bizarre" by OMC which had become the team's unofficial anthem.

=== Details ===
4 May 1997
15:00 BST

| Millwall Lionesses | 1–0 | Wembley |
|---|---|---|
| Waller 51' | Report |

Upton Park, London
Attendance: 3,015
Referee: Clive Wilkes (Gloucestershire)

| Millwall Lionesses | Wembley |

| GK | 1 | (England) Pauline Cope (c) |
| DF | 2 | (Republic of Ireland) Abbie Walsh |
| DF | 8 | (England) Mary Phillip |
| DF | 5 | (England) Katie Chapman | (substituted off) 87' |
| MF | 11 | (England) Tina Lindsay |
| MF | 6 | (England) Danielle Murphy |
| MF | 4 | (England) Lou Waller |
| MF | 3 | (United States) Tracy Osborn |
| MF | 10 | (England) Justine Lorton |
| FW | 9 | (England) Pru Buckley |
| FW | 7 | (England) Sally Ede | (substituted off) 88' |
Substitutes:
| DF | 12 | (England) Julie Fletcher | (substituted on) 87' |
| FW | 16 | (England) Pam Bedzrah | (substituted on) 88' |
| GK | 13 | (England) Katrina Knowler |
| FW | 14 | (England) Nina Downham |
| DF | 15 | (England) Sophie Chapman |
Manager:
(England) Jim Hicks

| GK | 1 | (England) Lesley Higgs |
| DF | 2 | (England) Kirsty Hewitson |
| DF | 5 | (England) Carol Harwood |
| DF | 3 | (England) Lynn Frampton |
| MF | 4 | (England) Siobhan Melia (c) |
| MF | 8 | (England) Donna Burns |
| MF | 6 | (England) Julie Darby |
| MF | 10 | (England) Michelle Lee | (substituted off) 85' |
| MF | 7 | (England) Paula Callinan | (substituted off) 70' |
| FW | 9 | (Wales) Naz Ball |
| FW | 11 | (England) Tracy Koch |
Substitutes:
| MF | 15 | (England) Lois Fidler | (substituted on) 70' |
| MF | 14 | (England) Sue Jones | (substituted on) 85' |
| GK | 13 | (England) Orla Harrell |
| FW | 12 | (Israel) Ayala Liran |
| FW | 16 | (England) Jessica Lippiatt |
Manager:
(England) John Jones

Player of the match
Carol Harwood (Wembley)

Assistant referees:
Guy Beale (Somerset)
Barry Polkey (Nottinghamshire)
Fourth official:
Martin Ebbage (Berks & Bucks)

Match rules

- 90 minutes.
- 30 minutes of extra-time if necessary.
- Penalty shoot-out if scores still level.
- Five named substitutes.
- Maximum of three substitutions.

== Post match ==
A recording of the full game was broadcast at 18:00 BST by Cup sponsors, the cable television channel UK Living.
