= 1996–97 FA Women's Cup =

Tournament details
- Country: England & Wales

Final positions
- Champions: Millwall Lionesses
- Runners-up: Wembley
- Penalty shoot-outs do not count towards the total number of goals.

The 1996–97 FA Women's Cup was an association football knockout tournament for women's teams, held between 8 September 1996 and 4 May 1997. It was the 27th season of the FA Women's Cup and was won by Millwall Lionesses, who defeated Wembley in the final.

The tournament consisted of one preliminary round and eight rounds of competition proper.

All match results and dates from the Women's FA Cup Website.

== Preliminary round ==
All games were scheduled for 8 September 1996.

Tie	Home team (tier)	Score	Away team (tier)	Att.
1	Bedford Bells	1–0	Cambridge United	
2	Truro City	1–7	Barry Town	

== First round proper ==
All games were scheduled for 29 September 1996.

Tie	Home team (tier)	Score	Away team (tier)	Att.
1	Abbey Rangers	8–0	Camberwell Old Fallopians	
2	Bangor City	5–1	Stockport County	
3	Barnet	3–1	Winchester & Ealing	
4	Barry Town	3–1	Plymouth Pilgrims	
5	Bath City	6–2	Wokingham Town	
6	Belper Town	1–7	Tamworth	
7	Binfield	H–W	Freeway	
Walkover for Binfield
8	Blackburn Rovers	6–1	Barnsley	
9	Bracknell Town	1–9	Yate Town	
10	Brentford & Hampton	5–0	Luton	
11	Cambridge City	3–5	Clacton	
12	Canary Racers	1–2	Calverton MW	
13	Cardiff County	1–0	Thame United	
14	Charlton	4–1	Farnborough Town	
15	Chelmsford City	2–1	Leatherhead	
16	Chester City	6–0	Brighouse	
17	Cinderford Town	0–10	Swindon Town	
18	Clapton	3–2	Enfield	
19	Clevedon United	0–6	Portsmouth	
20	Colchester	0–3	Newcastle Town	
21	Collier Row	5–1	Chipstead	
22	Darlington	4–2	Runcorn	
23	Denham United	6–1	Camberley Town	
24	Derby County	3–4	Bedford Bells	
25	Doncaster Rovers	8–1	Winsford United	
26	Dulwich Hamlet	3–2	Gillingham	
27	Dunstable	A–W	Chelsea	
Walkover for Chelsea
28	Elmore Eagles	0–4	Cable–Tel (Newport)	
29	Exeter Rangers	3–7	Bristol City	
30	Hackney	4–1	Aylesbury Stocklake	
Match abandoned after 76 minutes due to player injury, result stands.
31	Haslingden	0–7	Oldham Athletic	
32	Hassocks	1–2 (a.e.t.)	Harlow Town	
33	Hastings Town	1–6	Harlequins	
34	Haverhill Rovers	2–3	Shrewsbury Town	
35	Kirklees	1–3	Leeds United	
36	Leek Town	1–2	Highfield Rangers	
37	Leicester City	1–0	Norwich United	

Tie	Home team (tier)	Score	Away team (tier)	Att.
38	London Women	9–1	Queens Park Rangers Ladies South	
39	Lowestoft Town	12–0	Rea Valley Rovers	
40	Manchester Belle Vue	0–1	Middlesbrough	
41	Mill Hill United	11–0	Great Wakering Rovers	
42	Milton Keynes Athletic	0–3	Coventry City	
43	Nettleham	1–2	Birmingham City	
44	Newcastle	0–1	Chester Le Street Town	
45	Newham	5–0	Redbridge Wanderers	
46	Newsham Park Hospital	1–2	Manchester United	
47	Okeford United	3–2	Bridgwater Town	
48	Preston Rangers	9–0	Whalley Rangers	
49	Pye	1–3	Colchester United	
50	Radcliffe Borough	6–0	Wrexham	
51	Reading Royals	7–0	Frome	
52	Rochdale	10–0	Deans	
53	Romford	A–W	Slough Town	
Walkover for Slough Town
54	Sawbridgeworth Town	4–1	Stanway	
55	Scunthorpe Ironesses	2–3	Stockport	
56	Sheffield Hallam United	1–2	Warrington Town	
57	Sherborne	3–1	Barnstaple Town	
58	Sunderland	3–4 (a.e.t.)	Chesterfield	
59	Surbiton Town	2–1	Crowborough Athletic	
60	Swindon Town Spitfires	10–0	Clevedon Town	
61	Teynham Gunners	2–8	St Georges (Eltham)	
62	Tottenham Hotspur	11–0	Stevenage	
63	Trafford	1–3	Liverpool Feds	
64	Wakefield	7–0	York City	
65	Watford & Evergreen	3–2	Chesham United	
66	West Ham United	1–2 (a.e.t.)	Fulham	
67	Wigan	2–1	Hull City	
68	Worcester City	8–3	Newton Abbot	

== Second round proper ==
All games were originally scheduled for 3 and 10 November 1996.

Tie	Home team (tier)	Score	Away team (tier)	Att.
1	Abbey Rangers	4–5	Chelmsford City	
2	Barry Town	18–0	Bristol City	
3	Bath City	2–2 (a.e.t.)	Okeford United	
replay	Okeford United	2–1	Bath City	
4	Bedford Bells	0–1 (a.e.t.)	Three Bridges	
5	Berkhamsted Town	8–0	Lowestoft Town	
6	Blackburn Rovers	H–W	Bronte	
Walkover for Blackburn Rovers
7	Bradford City	1–2	Blyth Spartans Kestrels	
8	Brentford & Hampton	1–3	Whitehawk	
9	Brighton & Hove Albion	5–0	Newham	
10	Cardiff County	1–3	Cable–Tel (Newport)	
11	Charlton	0–4	Dulwich Hamlet	
12	Chesterfield	1–3	Bangor City	
13	Colchester United	1–4	Collier Row	
14	Coventry City	3–1	Leicester City	
15	Doncaster Rovers	2–4 (a.e.t.)	Huddersfield Town	
16	Fulham	2–3	Clapton	
17	Garswood Saints	2–1	Manchester United	
18	Hackney	3–4	Denham United	
19	Harlequins	3–1	Clacton	
20	Harlow Town	0–4	Mill Hill United	
21	Highfield Rangers	4–2	Chester City	

Tie	Home team (tier)	Score	Away team (tier)	Att.
22	Ipswich Town	3–0	Surbiton Town	
23	Langford	0–1	Chelsea	
24	London Women	2–2 (a.e.t.)	Sawbridgeworth Town	
replay	Sawbridgeworth Town	0–2	London Women	
25	Middlesbrough	H–W	Chester Le Street Town	
Walkover for Middlesbrough
26	Notts County	0–5	Newcastle Town	
27	Oldham Athletic	11–3	Warrington Town	
28	Portsmouth	0–1	Oxford United	
29	Radcliffe Borough	2–3	Preston Rangers	
30	Reading Royals	5–0	Swindon Town	
31	Rochdale	0–7	Leeds United	
32	Sheffield Wednesday	8–1	Darlington	
33	Sherborne	5–2	Yate Town	
34	Slough Town	0–6	Swindon Town Spitfires	
35	St Georges (Eltham)	2–5	Leyton Orient	
36	Stockport	3–0	Liverpool Feds	
37	Stourport Swifts	3–1	Shrewsbury Town	
38	Tamworth	1–5	Calverton MW	
39	Tottenham Hotspur	2–1	Wimbledon	
40	Town & County Diamonds	0–2	Birmingham City	
41	Wakefield	8–0	Wigan	
42	Watford & Evergreen	1–3	Barnet	
43	Wolverhampton Wanderers	0–5	Aston Villa	
44	Worcester City	0–2	Binfield	

== Third round proper ==
All games were originally scheduled for 1 and 8 December 1996.

Tie	Home team (tier)	Score	Away team (tier)	Att.
1	Bangor City	2–2 (a.e.t.)	Newcastle Town	
replay	Newcastle Town	1–1 (3–5 p)	Bangor City	
2	Blackburn Rovers	0–3	Preston Rangers	
3	Blyth Spartans Kestrels	1–4	Garswood Saints	
4	Brighton & Hove Albion	7–2	Cable–Tel (Newport)	
5	Calverton MW	1–2	Stockport	
6	Chelmsford City	1–1 (a.e.t.)	Barnet	
replay	Barnet	2–2 (3–5 p)	Chelmsford City	
7	Clapton	1–5	Barry Town	
8	Collier Row	3–1	Birmingham City	
9	Coventry City	2–3	Huddersfield Town	
10	Dulwich Hamlet	1–6	Berkhamsted Town	

Tie	Home team (tier)	Score	Away team (tier)	Att.
11	Harlequins	0–12	Tottenham Hotspur	
12	Highfield Rangers	1–0	Oldham Athletic	
13	Leeds United	2–5	Aston Villa	
14	London Women	0–5	Sherborne	
15	Middlesbrough	3–2	Stourport Swifts	
16	Mill Hill United	0–1	Ipswich Town	
17	Okeford United	1–2	Denham United	
18	Oxford United	1–4	Reading Royals	
19	Sheffield Wednesday	3–2	Wakefield	
20	Swindon Town Spitfires	0–1	Chelsea	
21	Three Bridges	1–2	Leyton Orient	
22	Whitehawk	2–1	Binfield	

== Fourth round proper ==
All games were originally scheduled for 5, 12 and 19 January 1997.

5 January 1997	Aston Villa (2)	1–0	Brighton & Hove Albion (2)	Knowle
	Goal	Report		Stadium: Robin's Nest

5 January 1997	Ipswich Town (2)	0–8	Middlesbrough (3)
		Report	Goal

5 January 1997	Preston Rangers (3)	12–0	Denham United (3)
	Goal	Report

5 January 1997	Southampton Saints (1)	4–0	Whitehawk (2)
	Goal	Report

5 January 1997	Reading Royals (3)	2–1	Leyton Orient (2)
	Williams 61'; Strudley 85'	Report	Oliver 64'

5 January 1997	Stockport (3)	2–6	Bangor City (3)
	Goal	Report	Goal

5 January 1997	Tranmere Rovers (1)	1–2 (a.e.t.)	Wembley (1)	Heswall
	Carter	Report	Harwood; Jerray-Silver 95'	Stadium: Gayton Park

12 January 1997	Chelsea (3)	0–3	Millwall Lionesses
		Report	Goal

12 January 1997	Garswood Saints (2)	3–4	Ilkeston Town (1)	Garswood
	Goal	Report	Kirk; White	Stadium: Simms Lane End

12 January 1997	Sherborne (3)	0–7	Everton (1)	Yeovil
		Report	Thomas; McGrady; Marley	Stadium: Huish Park

19 January 1997	Arsenal (1)	6–0	Barry Town (3)	Bromley
	K. Smith; Wheatley; Daly; (o.g.)	Report		Stadium: Hayes Lane

19 January 1997	Chelmsford City (3)	2–5	Huddersfield Town (2)	Chelmsford
	Goal	Report	Mitchell 3'; Hargreaves; Mitchell 30'; McCourt	Stadium: Melbourne Stadium

19 January 1997	Croydon (1)	2–1	Liverpool (1)	Croydon
	Powell 84'; Davis 87'	Report	Burke 50'	Stadium: Croydon Sports Arena

19 January 1997	Doncaster Belles (1)	10–1	Sheffield Wednesday (2)
	Walker 4'; Begg 8'; Exley; Woodhead	Report	Goal

19 January 1997	Highfield Rangers (3)	2–3	Berkhamsted Town (2)
	Goal	Report	Burton; Overbye

19 January 1997	Tottenham Hotspur (3)	7–2	Collier Row (3)
	Goal	Report	Goal

== Fifth round proper ==
All games were played on 2 February 1997.

2 February 1997	Arsenal (1)	9–0	Huddersfield Town (2)	Bromley
	Broadhurst 8'; Wooding (o.g.); Lee Reynolds; Williams; White; Benham	Report		Stadium: Hayes Lane

2 February 1997	Bangor City (3)	0–2	Everton (1)	Bangor
		Report	Bertie; Thomas	Stadium: Farrar Road Stadium

2 February 1997	Southampton Saints (1)	1–1 (a.e.t.)	Berkhamsted Town (2)
	10' (pen.)	Report	Lawrence

9 February 1997 Replay	Berkhamsted Town (2)	3–2	Southampton Saints (1)	Berkhamsted
	Bevill 33'; Burton 59'; Overbye	Report	32'; 78'	Stadium: Broadwater

2 February 1997	Middlesbrough (3)	0–3	Ilkeston Town (1)
		Report	Kirk 15', 51'; Brown 90'

2 February 1997	Millwall Lionesses (1)	3–0	Doncaster Belles (1)	Rotherhithe
	Lindsay; Walker; Buckley	Report		Stadium: Surrey Docks Stadium

2 February 1997	Reading Royals (3)	2–4	Aston Villa (2)	Reading
	Hall; Abbott 76'	Report	Sheppard 24'; Ashworth 33'; Hurley 35'; Masters 60'	Stadium: Scours Lane; Referee: Hawkins

2 February 1997	Tottenham Hotspur (3)	0–4	Croydon (1)
		Report	Proctor; Davis; Powell; Bampton

2 February 1997	Wembley (1)	1–0 (a.e.t.)	Preston Rangers (3)
	Melia 95'	Report		Referee: D. L. Cutler

== Quarter-finals ==
All games were played on 2 March 1997.

2 March 1997	Berkhamsted Town (2)	0–0 (a.e.t.)	Wembley (1)
		Report

9 March 1997 Replay	Wembley (1)	3–1 (a.e.t.)	Berkhamsted Town (2)
	82' (o.g.)	Report	Bevil 38'

2 March 1997	Croydon (1)	1–0	Everton (1)	Croydon
	Powell 45'	Report		Stadium: Croydon Sports Arena

6 March 1997	Ilkeston Town (1)	2–4	Arsenal (1)	Ilkeston
19:30 GMT	Kirk 20'	Report	Few; Williams 40'; Yankey 73'; Spacey	Stadium: New Manor Ground
Note: Ilkeston Town's tie with Arsenal was re-arranged for 6 March 1997.

2 March 1997	Millwall Lionesses (1)	4–1 (a.e.t.)	Aston Villa (2)
	Goal	Report	Goal

== Semi–finals ==
Matches were played on 30 March 1997.

30 March 1997	Millwall Lionesses (1)	1–1 (a.e.t.) (3–1 p)	Croydon (1)	East Dulwich
	Osborn 120'	Report	Davis 116'	Stadium: Champion Hill; Attendance: 539
	Penalties
	Lorton (penalty scored); Ede (penalty missed); Phillip (penalty scored); Cope (penalty missed); Lindsay (penalty scored)		(penalty missed) Powell; (penalty missed) Bampton; (penalty scored) Sempare; (penalty missed) Mapes

30 March 1997	Wembley (1)	1–0	Arsenal (1)	Borehamwood
	Koch 81'	Report		Stadium: Meadow Park; Attendance: 289

== Final ==
4 May 1997
15:00 BST

Millwall Lionesses	1–0	Wembley
Waller 51'	Report

Upton Park, London
Attendance: 3,015
Referee: Clive Wilkes (Gloucestershire)
