= 1996–97 FA Women's Premier League Cup =

Tournament details
- Country: England

Final positions
- Champions: Millwall Lionesses
- Runners-up: Everton

The 1996–97 FA Women's Premier League Cup was the 6th staging of the FA Women's Premier League Cup, a knockout competition for England's top 36 women's football clubs.

The tournament was won by Millwall Lionesses, who beat Everton 2–1 in the final.

== Results ==
=== First round ===
First round matches were played on the 27 October and 10 November 1996.

Wembley and Doncaster Belles had byes into the next round.

27 October 1996	Berkhamsted Town (S)	1–2	Ipswich Town (S)
	Burton	Report	Goal

27 October 1996	Blyth Spartans Kestrals (NO)	3–5	Aston Villa (NO)
	Goal	Report	Goal

27 October 1996	Brighton & Hove Albion (S)	1–1	Tranmere Rovers (NA)
	Goal	Report	Goal

27 October 1996	Garswood Saints (NO)	0–1 (a.e.t.)	Huddersfield Town (NO)
		Report	Wooding 92'

27 October 1996	Ilkeston Town (NA)	3–1 (a.e.t.)	Bradford City (NO)
	Saggers; Kirk	Report	43'

27 October 1996	Leyton Orient (S)	3–1	Langford (S)
	Goal	Report	Goal

27 October 1996	Liverpool (NA)	1–2	Arsenal (NA)
	Goal	Report	Lee Reynolds 46'; Wheatley

27 October 1996	Notts County (NO)	0–5	Wimbledon (S)
		Report	Goal

27 October 1996	Oxford United (S)	1–4	Stourport Swifts (NO)
	Goal	Report	Goal

27 October 1996	Southampton Saints (NA)	0–5	Everton (NA)
		Report	Thomas; McGrady; Bertie; Marley

27 October 1996	Whitehawk (S)	0–2	Croydon (NA)
		Report	Carlin 45'; Powell 71'

27 October 1996	Wolverhampton Wanderers (NO)	W–O	Bronte (NO)
		Report

10 November 1996	Millwall Lionesses (NA)	3–2	Sheffield Wednesday (N)
	Goal	Report	Goal

10 November 1996	Town & County Diamonds (S)	1–4	Three Bridges (S)
	65'	Report	Beer 8'; Condon; Hodges; Conners

=== Second round ===
Second round matches were played on the 24 November, 1 and 8 December 1996.

24 November 1996	Brighton & Hove Albion (S)	1–6	Everton (NA)
	Fleming 20'	Report	Thomas 2'; McGrady 10'; Scattergood; Mason; Edwards

24 November 1996	Croydon (NA)	1–1 (a.e.t.) (3–4 p)	Aston Villa (NO)
	Davis 48'	Report	78'
	Penalties
	Osbourne (penalty missed); Mulligan (penalty missed)		Penalty scored

24 November 1996	Doncaster Belles (NA)	2–1	Arsenal (NA)
	Exley 44'; Walker 50'	Report	White

24 November 1996	Ipswich Town (S)	1–4	Wimbledon (S)
	Goal	Report	Goal

24 November 1996	Stourport Swifts (NO)	3–1	Leyton Orient (S)
	Goal	Report	Goal

24 November 1996	Three Bridges (S)	0–1	Ilkeston Town (NA)
		Report	Hardwick

1 December 1996	Wolverhampton Wanderers (NO)	1–8	Wembley (NA)
	Goal	Report	Goal

8 December 1996	Huddersfield Town (NO)	0–5	Millwall Lionesses (NA)
		Report	Buckley 6', 88', 90'; Downham

=== Quarter-finals ===
Quarter-finals were played on the 8 and 15 December 1996

8 December 1996	Aston Villa (NO)	5–2	Ilkeston Town (NA)
	Walters	Report	Plinstone; Kirk

15 December 1996	Millwall Lionesses (NA)	4–0	Stourport Swifts (NO)
	Waller	Report

15 December 1996	Wembley (NA)	2–3	Everton (NA)
	Kotch; Jerray-Silver	Report	Marley; Bertie

15 December 1996	Wimbledon (S)	1–8	Doncaster Belles (NA)
	Goal	Report	Exley; Begg; Walker; Wooliscroft; Sherrard

=== Semi-finals ===
Semi-finals were played on the 26 January 1997

26 January 1997	Doncaster Belles (NA)	1–1 (a.e.t.) (2–4 p)	Millwall Lionesses (NA)
	Walker 90'	Report	Goal
	Penalties
	Jackson (penalty scored); Walker (penalty scored); Exley (penalty missed); Utley (penalty missed)		(penalty scored) Waller; (penalty scored) Lorton; (penalty scored) Phillip; (penalty scored) Buckley

26 January 1997	Everton (NA)	5–2	Aston Villa (NO)
	12' (o.g.); Marley 14'; Bertie 45'; McGrady; Thomas	Report	(o.g.)

=== Final ===
The final was played on 23 March 1997 at Underhill Stadium, Barnet.

23 March 1997

Everton	1–2	Millwall Lionesses
Thomas 22' (pen.)	Report	Murphy 61'; Lindsay 69'

Underhill Stadium, Barnet
Attendance: 1,505
Referee: Mrs W. Toms (Dorset FA)
