= Pru Buckley =

English footballer

Personal information
- Date of birth: 20 July 1973 (age 53)
- Position: Forward

Senior career*
Years	Team	Apps	(Gls)
- Millwall Lionesses L.F.C.

International career
1997	England	3	(0)

Managerial career
- Millwall Lionesses L.F.C.
- * Club domestic league appearances and goals

Pru Buckley (born 20 July 1973) is a former women's association football player best known for playing for Millwall Lionesses L.F.C. She also appeared for the senior England women's national football team. Buckley won the 1997 FA Women's Cup Final with Millwall, the last of three trophies of that season after winning the women's Kent Cup and the FA Women's National League Cup. Buckley made over 500 appearances for Millwall in her career, which included serving as player-manager.

== International career ==
In November 2022, Buckley was recognized by The Football Association as one of the England national team's legacy players, and as the 121st women's player to be capped by England. Buckley represented England 3 times.

== Honours ==
Millwall

- FA Women's National League Cup: 1997
- FA Women's Cup: 1997
