= Tracy Osborn =

American soccer player

Personal information
- Date of birth: c. 1972 (age 53–54)
- Position: Midfielder

College career
| Years | Team | Apps | (Gls) |
| 1991–1994 | Portland Pilots | | |

Senior career*
| Years | Team | Apps | (Gls) |
| 1996 | Umeå IK | | |
| 1997 | Millwall Lionesses L.F.C. | | |
- * Club domestic league appearances and goals

Tracy Osborn Nelson is a former American women's soccer player. Osborn won the 1997 FA Women's Cup Final. She was the first American to win the Women's FA Cup.

== Honors ==
- FA Women's Cup: 1997
