= Jim Hicks (footballer) =

English footballer and coach (born 1960)

Personal information
- Full name: James Michael Hicks
- Date of birth: 16 September 1960 (age 66)
- Place of birth: Ipswich, England
- Height: 6 ft 2 in (1.88 m)
- Position: Centre back

Senior career*
Years	Team	Apps	(Gls)
- Newmarket Town
- Soham Town Rangers
- University of Warwick
	Coventry City	0	(0)
- St Luke's College
1983–1984	Exeter City	3	(0)
1984–1985	Oxford United	0	(0)
1985–1988	Fulham	40	(1)
1989	Washington Stars		
1989–1990	Farnborough Town	4	(0)
- Kingstonian
- Baldock Town
- St Albans City
- Wealdstone
- Ely City
- Downham Town

Managerial career
- 1993–2008: Millwall Lionesses
- * Club domestic league appearances and goals

James Michael Hicks (born 16 September 1960) is an English former professional footballer and coach. In December 2006 Hicks became senior executive head of coaching at the Professional Footballers' Association (PFA). He had a long association with Millwall FC's community department which included managing the club's affiliated female team, Millwall Lionesses.

== Playing career ==
Hicks played non-League football while completing his education, then made his Football League debut with Exeter City in 1983–84. After three appearances as a non–contract player, he spent the following season with Oxford United without featuring in the first team.

In the summer of 1985, Oxford sent Hicks, Gary Barnett and around £150,000 to Fulham in exchange for Ray Houghton. Over the next three seasons Hicks' whole–hearted displays in central defence won over the Fulham supporters, although other players were considered to be more talented.

In 1989, Hicks played for Washington Stars in the American Soccer League. He also played for Madison United Soccer Club in the United States.

== Coaching career ==
Hicks worked for Millwall's community scheme, which was established during the 1980s to rid the club of its negative associations with hooliganism and racism. As manager of Millwall Lionesses, Hicks guided the club to an Women's FA Cup and FA Women's Premier League Cup double in 1997. Under his leadership the Lionesses produced several England international players including Mary Phillip and Katie Chapman.

In 2008, Hicks obtained the UEFA Pro Licence, the highest football coaching award available in Europe.

== Honours ==
=== Manager ===
==== Club ====
Millwall Lionesses

- Women's FA Cup (1): 1996–97
- FA Women's Premier League Cup (1): 1996–97
