= Steve Walklate =

English footballer (born 1979)

Personal information
- Date of birth: 27 September 1979
- Place of birth: Durham, England
- Height: 5 ft 11 in (1.80 m)
- Positions: Midfielder; defender

Senior career*
| Years | Team | Apps | (Gls) |
| – | Middlesbrough | 0 | (0) |
| 2000–2001 | Darlington | 6 | (0) |
| 2001 | Blyth Spartans | 2 | (0) |
| 2001 | Queen of the South | 7 | (0) |
| 2001–2005 | Durham City | | (2) |
| 2005–2006 | Bedlington Terriers | | |
| 2006–2008 | Sunderland Nissan | | |
| 2008–2011 | Shildon | | |
| 2011 | Bishop Auckland | | |
| 2013–201? | Crook Town | | |
- * Club domestic league appearances and goals

Steven "Steve" Walklate (born 27 September 1979) is an English former footballer who played in the Football League for Darlington and in the Scottish League for Queen of the South. He began his career at Middlesbrough without playing first-team football for them, and also played non-league football for a number of clubs in the north-east of England, mostly in the Northern League.

He played either as a midfielder or in defence, whether at full back or in his preferred position of central defender.

== Football career ==
Walklate was born in Durham, He was a member of Chester-le-Street Junior Schools representative football team for two years rather than the usual one, and played for Durham County Schools at under-16 level. He began his career with Middlesbrough, but never played for their first team, and after a trial, signed for Darlington ahead of the 2000–01 Football League season. He made his debut on 2 September 2000, as a second-half substitute in the Division Three match at home to York City which finished as a 1–1 draw, and made his first start in the League Cup visit to Division One club Nottingham Forest a few days later; he was replaced at half time by eventual match-winner Stuart Elliott. He also played in the next round of the competition, as Darlington lost 7–2 to Premier League club Bradford City. His short-term contract was extended, and he made six more appearances in all competitions, the last of which was on 26 December, before being released at the end of February 2001. According to the Northern Echo's correspondent, manager Gary Bennett was having to ask players, Walklate included, "to fill the boots of their of their quality predecessors – but the new bunch simply weren't up to the task".

After his release, Walklate played two Northern Premier League matches for Blyth Spartans, and then one Scottish Second Division match as a triallist for Queen of the South, in a 2–2 draw with Berwick Rangers on 25 March. He signed for the club, remained in the starting eleven for the next fixture, also against Berwick, and also a draw, and appeared in five of Queens' six remaining matches, all but one as a starter.

He returned to England and joined Durham City of the Northern League, with whom he was to spend four years. He assisted the team to four successive top-six finishes, including runners-up spot in 2003–04. In his first season, they progressed through seven rounds to the semi-final of the FA Vase only to lose to Whitley Bay on aggregate score, and Walklate scored his first goal for the club in the Northern League Challenge Cup final, in which Durham beat Shildon on a golden goal to secure their first ever senior trophy. His second and third seasons were disrupted by a double leg fracture suffered during a match in March 2003; he made his first-team comeback at the end of October. He scored just twice in league matches, at each end of the 2004–05 season: the late fourth in a 4–0 win away to Billingham Town, and a 35-yard (32 m) lob in a 1–1 draw at West Auckland Town.

Walklate spent the 2005–06 season with Bedlington Terriers, and then joined Sunderland Nissan. He stayed with Nissan for two seasons, in the second of which he received the Manager's Player of the Year award. The same year, he was a member of the Hetton Lyons team that won the FA Sunday Cup. Walklate then spent three seasons with Shildon, a few months with Bishop Auckland, and a spell with Crook Town during which he helped them win the Northern League Division Two title.
