= Mark Summerbell =

English footballer

Personal information
- Full name: Mark Summerbell
- Date of birth: 30 October 1976 (age 50)
- Place of birth: Durham, England
- Position: Midfielder

Youth career
- Middlesbrough

Senior career*
Years	Team	Apps	(Gls)
1995–2002	Middlesbrough	51	(1)
1996	→ Cork City (loan)		
2001	→ Bristol City (loan)	5	(0)
2002	→ Portsmouth (loan)	5	(0)
2002–2004	Carlisle United	45	(1)
2004	Spennymoor United		
2004–?	Chester-le-Street Town		
- Redmire United
- South Moor Sports
- Framwellgate Moor Salutation
- * Club domestic league appearances and goals

Mark Summerbell (born 30 October 1976) is an English football midfielder. He has played for Middlesbrough, Cork City, Bristol City, Portsmouth and Carlisle United.

Summerbell was born in Durham and played county football for Chester-le-Street at under-15 level. He played for Middlesbrough as a trainee, making his Premiership debut on 8 April 1996 against Tottenham Hotspur. He scored once in the league, in August 2000 against Tottenham Hotspur, also scoring three times in the League Cup in games against Bolton Wanderers, Everton and Macclesfield Town. While at Boro, he spent time on loan at Cork City, Bristol City and Portsmouth, where he made five appearances in the First Division.

Summerbell ended his professional career at Carlisle United, where he scored once, against Torquay United, in 45 league appearances. Whilst at Carlisle he played in the 2003 Football League Trophy Final. He played for Spennymoor United between July and October 2004, then moved to Chester-le-Street Town. He went on to play for Redmire United, South Moor Sports, and in the Durham & District Sunday League for Framwellgate Moor Salutation.

== Honours ==
Carlisle United

- Football League Trophy runner-up: 2002–03
