= Anthony Ormerod =

English footballer

Personal information
- Date of birth: 31 March 1979 (age 47)
- Place of birth: Middlesbrough, England
- Position: Midfielder

Senior career*
Years	Team	Apps	(Gls)
1996–2002	Middlesbrough	19	(3)
1999	→ Carlisle United (loan)	5	(0)
1999	→ Bury (loan)	?	(?)
1999–2000	→ York City (loan)	12	(0)
2001	→ Hartlepool United (loan)	2	(0)
2002–2003	Scarborough	30	(2)
2003–2010	Whitby Town	228	(37)
2008–2010	→ Spennymoor Town (loan)	2	(0)
2010–????	Marske United	79	(7)
- * Club domestic league appearances and goals

Anthony Ormerod (born 31 March 1979) is an English former professional footballer who played as a midfielder.

== Career ==
=== Middlesbrough ===
Anthoney Ormerod started his career at Middlesbrough and scored on his debut in a 2–2 draw against Bradford City in the First Division on 13 September 1997. His next goal came in a 3–1 win against QPR on 8 November. He scored again seven days later in the 3–1 victory against Norwich. Overall, he made 23 appearances in his first season with Middlesbrough as the Teesside club regained promotion to the Premier League.

=== Marske United ===
Ormerod joined Northern League Division 2 side Marske in 2010 after being signed by then manager Paul Burton. He helped the club achieve promotion in 2010–11 with the team finishing 3rd. The next year the team consolidated and survived relegation, finishing 18th in the Northern League Division 1. Overall Ormerod has made 79 appearances for the Seasiders and has scored 7 goals to present.
