= Steve Baker (footballer, born 1978) =

English footballer

Personal information
- Full name: Steven Richard Baker
- Date of birth: 8 September 1978 (age 48)
- Place of birth: Pontefract, West Yorkshire
- Height: 6 ft 0 in (1.83 m)
- Position: Defender

Senior career*
Years	Team	Apps	(Gls)
1997–2002	Middlesbrough	8	(0)
1999	→ Huddersfield Town (loan)	4	(0)
2000	→ Darlington (loan)	5	(0)
2000	→ Hartlepool United (loan)	9	(0)
2001–2002	→ Scarborough (loan)	18	(1)
2002–2006	Scarborough	88	(0)
2006–2008	Gateshead	82	(0)
2008–2009	Newcastle Blue Star	?	(?)
- * Club domestic league appearances and goals

Steven Richard Baker (born 8 September 1978) is an English footballer who played as a defender for Middlesbrough, Huddersfield Town, Darlington and Hartlepool United.

Baker made his debut for Middlesbrough in the 1997–98 campaign, and went on to make five league appearances that season as they were promoted to the Premier League. The following season he made just two Premier League appearances. He suffered two cruciate ligament injuries in the space of three years.

Baker also represented the Republic of Ireland under-21 team over a five-year period, earning over 35 caps. Baker joined Scarborough, initially on loan from Middlesbrough, in 2001, and went on to make more than 100 Conference appearances for them. He was released at the end of the 2005–06 season. He signed for Gateshead in July 2006, but missed the whole of the 2007–08 season with injury.
