= Tina Lindsay =

English footballer

Personal information
- Position: Winger

Senior career*
Years	Team	Apps	(Gls)
1997-2001	Millwall Lionesses L.F.C.		

International career
1997	England	1	(0)
- * Club domestic league appearances and goals

Tina Lindsay is a former England women's international footballer. Lindsay greatest achievement was winning the 1997 FA Women's Cup Final with Millwall Lionesses when they beat Wembley 1-0 at the Boleyn Ground and winning the League Cup the same season.

== International career ==
In November 2022, Lindsay was recognized by The Football Association as one of the England national team's legacy players, and as the 125th women's player to be capped by England.

== Honours ==
Millwall

- FA Women's Cup: 1997
