= Vladimír Kinder =

Slovak footballer

Personal information
- Full name: Vladimír Kinder
- Date of birth: 9 March 1969 (age 57)
- Place of birth: Bratislava, Czechoslovakia
- Height: 5 ft 10 in (1.78 m)
- Position: Defender

Team information
- Current team: FC Petržalka akadémia
- Number: 27

Senior career*
Years	Team	Apps	(Gls)
1990–1996	Slovan Bratislava	161	(22)
1997–1999	Middlesbrough	37	(5)
1999–2000	Drnovice	19	(0)
2000–2003	Artmedia Petržalka	80	(13)
2003–2004	SC Untersiebenbrunn	32	(8)
2004–2005	Schwadorf	18	(8)
2005	SF Berg		
2006–2014	PŠC Pezinok		
2008	→ Slovenský Grob (loan)		
2010–2011	→ FK Slovan Kendice (loan)		
2014–	FC Petržalka akadémia		

International career
1993	RCS	1	(0)
1994–2001	Slovakia	38	(1)
- * Club domestic league appearances and goals as of 27 August 2014

Vladimír Kinder (born 9 March 1969) is a retired Slovak professional footballer who last played as a left-back for FC Petržalka akadémia.

Kinder played for Middlesbrough in England between 1997 and 1999. He helped them reach three domestic cup finals as well as win promotion to the Premier League.

He earned 1 cap for Representation of Czechs and Slovaks on 16 June 1993 against the Faroe Islands in a World Cup qualifier. Kinder then earned 38 caps for Slovakia, scoring one goal in a 4-2 friendly win over Croatia on 20 April 1994.

== Honours ==
Slovan Bratislava

- Czechoslovak First League: 1991–92
- Slovak Super Liga: 1993–94, 1994–95, 1995–96
- Slovak Super Cup: 1993, 1994, 1996

Middlesbrough

- Football League First Division second-place promotion: 1997–98
- FA Cup runner-up: 1996–97
- Football League Cup runner-up: 1996–97, 1997–98

Individual

- Slovak Footballer of the Year: 1994
- Slovak top eleven: 1993, 1994, 1995, 1996, 2001, 2002
