= Mikkel Beck =

Danish footballer (born 1973)

Personal information
- Full name: Mikkel Venge Beck
- Date of birth: 12 May 1973 (age 53)
- Place of birth: Aarhus, Denmark
- Height: 1.87 m (6 ft 2 in)
- Position: Forward

Youth career
- Bramdrupdam G&IF
- Kolding B

Senior career*
Years	Team	Apps	(Gls)
1992–1993	B 1909	13	(2)
1993–1996	Fortuna Köln	79	(26)
1996–1999	Middlesbrough	91	(24)
1999–2000	Derby County	18	(2)
1999	→ Nottingham Forest (loan)	5	(1)
2000	→ Queens Park Rangers (loan)	11	(4)
2000	→ AaB (loan)	10	(8)
2000–2002	Lille	33	(5)
2002	→ AaB (loan)	12	(4)
Total		272	(76)

International career
1993–1995	Denmark U-21	9	(3)
1995–2000	Denmark	19	(3)
- * Club domestic league appearances and goals

Mikkel Venge Beck (Danish pronunciation: [ˈme̝ɡl̩ ˈpɛk]; born 12 May 1973) is a Danish former professional footballer who played as a forward. He scored three goals in 19 games for the Denmark national team, and represented Denmark at the international Euro 1996 and Euro 2000 tournaments.

== Early life ==
Mikkel Beck was born in Aarhus, Denmark. Beck is the son of former Danish footballer Carl Beck, who played for AGF in the Danish first division in the late 1960s and early 1970s.

== Club career ==
Beck started his career with Danish lower league club Kolding IF, before playing a single season in the Danish Superliga for B 1909. He moved abroad to play professionally for German 2. Bundesliga club Fortuna Köln in 1993. Following a back injury which kept him out from August 1994 to February 1995, Beck scored in each of his first five games after recovery, and he received his first call-up for the Danish national team in May 1995. He scored three goals in his first six national team games and was subsequently voted the 1995 Danish Sports Talent of the Year. He was included in the Danish national squad for the Euro 1996 in England, where he played two games. Following the tournament, he was sold to English Premier League club Middlesbrough.

Despite reaching the 1997 FA Cup final in his first season with Middlesbrough, the club were relegated to the English First Division at the end of the season after a three-point deduction for failing to play a fixture. Beck stayed with the club and was an important part of the squad which won promotion to the Premier League the very next year. After 24 goals in 91 league matches for Middlesbrough, he moved to league rivals Derby County in March 1999 for £500,000. Beck failed to replicate the form he had shown with Boro. In August 1999, having failed to score at the beginning of the 1999–2000 season and having scored once since joining in March, he was booed by supporters. He scored a dramatic late equaliser in a 3–3 draw with Southampton in October 1999. Seeking playing time, Beck underwent loan deals to English lower league clubs. He signed a two-month loan deal to Nottingham Forest in November 1999, but after a month at the club, scoring once against Portsmouth, he was recalled by Derby, as the club experienced a lack of strikers. He made two substitute appearances back at Derby before Derby bought Belgian striker Branko Strupar and Beck was once more out of the team. He was then loaned out to QPR in February 2000 for three months. Despite good play for QPR, Beck was recalled in April 2000 in order to go on loan to Danish Superliga club Aalborg Boldspilklub (AaB) for the rest of the 1999–2000 Superliga season.

During his last year at Middlesbrough, and through the rest of his time in England, Beck had lost his place in the Danish national team. At AaB, he scored eight goals in ten matches and led the team to the Danish Cup final, gaining an international recall for Euro 2000. He played in two matches at the tournament and was subsequently purchased by French Division 1 club Lille for £500,000. Unhappy with Lille coach Vahid Halilhodžić's principle of rotating the players, Beck went on loan to AaB once again in February 2002. Despite hoping to be called up to the Danish national team for the 2002 World Cup, Beck was injured in the months before the tournament and was not considered for the squad. Back at Lille, he suffered a string of injuries which kept him out of football for 18 months. In September 2003, he trialled with Spanish side Córdoba CF but became injured after only two training sessions. In January 2004, he trained with English First Division club Crystal Palace, but injuries resurfaced during his stay at Palace. He failed to earn a contract and Beck retired.

== International career ==
Mikkel Beck scored three goals in 19 games for the Denmark national team, and represented Denmark at the international Euro 1996 and Euro 2000 tournaments. He played International leagues such as; WC Qualifiers Europe, Friendlies, EURO, EURO Qualifiers and EURO Qualifiers [U21]

== Post-playing career ==
Following his retirement, Beck became a player agent. He has been suspended and heavily fined twice for acting as a double agent. The second time was in 2022 when The Football Association suspended and fined him because he had represented Brighton & Hove Albion as well as Mathew Ryan when the latter changed from Valencia CF in 2017.

== Career statistics ==
Scores and results list Denmark's goal tally first, score column indicates score after each Beck goal.

List of international goals scored by Mikkel Beck
No.	Date	Venue	Opponent	Score	Result	Competition
1	31 May 1995	Helsinki Olympic Stadium, Helsinki, Finland	Finland	1–0	1–0	Friendly
2	6 September 1995	King Baudouin Stadium, Brussels, Belgium	Belgium	2–0	3–1	UEFA Euro 1996 qualification
3	15 November 1995	Parken Stadium, Copenhagen, Denmark	Armenia	2–0	3–1	UEFA Euro 1996 qualification

== Honours ==
Middlesbrough

- FA Cup runner-up: 1996–97
- Football League Cup runner-up: 1996–97, 1997–98
