= Louise Waller =

English footballer

Personal information
- Date of birth: 30 July 1969 (age 57)
- Place of birth: Lewisham, England
- Height: 5 ft 3 in (1.60 m)
- Positions: Defender; midfielder

Senior career*
Years	Team	Apps	(Gls)
- Millwall Lionesses
1988–1989	HJK Helsinki		

International career
1989–1997	England	32	(0)
- * Club domestic league appearances and goals

Louise "Lou" Waller (born 30 July 1969) is an English former international women's football defender. She was a member of the England squad for the 1995 FIFA Women's World Cup Finals. In a long association with Millwall Lionesses, Waller served the club as a player, coach, development officer, secretary and chairperson.

== Club career ==
In 1995, Waller was playing for Millwall Lionesses. She won both the 1996–97 FA Women's Premier League Cup and Women's FA Cup with Millwall. In the final of the latter competition, Waller headed the winning goal from Justine Lorton's corner, in front of 3,015 supporters at Upton Park.

Waller was also part of Millwall's 1991 FA Cup winning team, one of two senior players to remain with the club when most players left in the aftermath of the victory. Many young players who emerged at Millwall in the following years, including Katie Chapman, had been coached by Waller in the club's youth teams.

In 1993 Waller had been heavily involved in the creation of the country's first girls' Centre of Excellence at Millwall. She had joined the club as a 12-year-old and by February 1997 had made over 400 appearances for the Lionesses. When the club was promoted back to the top division in 2009, Waller—by now the chairperson—claimed they were "back where we belong".

Waller spent two summers playing in the Finnish Naisten SM-sarja for HJK Helsinki in 1988 and 1989. Lionesses manager Alan Wooler also played in Finland and arranged the move through his contacts. For her second season in Helsinki, Waller was joined by England teammate Marieanne Spacey.

== International career ==
Waller was a member of the England squad for the 1995 Women's World Cup. Her only appearance came as a late substitute for Tina Mapes in the final game, a 3–0 quarter final defeat against Germany.

Having joined the squad in 1989, Waller made over 30 appearances for England. Her final cap came in a 4–0 friendly defeat to Norway in June 1997. During qualification for UEFA Women's Euro 1993, Waller was sent off for handball as England crashed 3–0 to Italy at Millmoor, losing the tie 6–2 on aggregate and missing out on the four-team final tournament.

She has England legacy number 79. The FA announced their legacy numbers scheme to honour the 50th anniversary of England's inaugural international.

== Bibliography ==
- White, Nick (2001). Sun, Sea and Sexy Football: The Life and Times of British Footballers Abroad. London, England: Invextus. ISBN 0954161009.
