= FFA Australian Football Awards =

2009-2014 association football awards ceremony

The FFA Australian Football Awards was an awards ceremony held for the best Australian association football players. The ceremony was held annually from 2009 to 2014.

== Male footballer of the year ==
Year	Winner	Club
2009	Mark Schwarzer	(England) Fulham
2010	Mark Schwarzer	(England) Fulham
2011	Matt McKay	(Australia) Brisbane Roar / (Scotland) Rangers
2012	Brett Holman	(Netherlands) AZ / (England) Aston Villa
2013	Mile Jedinak	(England) Crystal Palace
2014	Mile Jedinak	(England) Crystal Palace

== Female Footballer of the Year ==
Year	Winner	Club
2009	Joanne Peters	(Australia) Newcastle Jets
2010	Clare Polkinghorne	(Australia) Brisbane Roar
2011	Elise Kellond-Knight	(Australia) Brisbane Roar
2012	Sally Shipard	(Australia) Canberra United / (Germany) Bayer Leverkusen
2013	Lisa De Vanna	(Australia) Perth Glory / (United States) Sky Blue FC / (Australia) Melbourne Victory
2014	Katrina Gorry	(Australia) Brisbane Roar / (United States) FC Kansas City

== Male U20 Footballer of the Year ==
Year	Winner	Club
2009	Daniel Mullen	(Australia) Adelaide United
2010	Tommy Oar	(Australia) Brisbane Roar / (Netherlands) Utrecht
2011	Mathew Ryan	(Australia) Central Coast Mariners
2012	Mathew Ryan	(Australia) Central Coast Mariners
2013	Joshua Brillante	(Australia) Newcastle Jets
2014	Awer Mabil	(Australia) Adelaide United

== Female U20 Footballer of the Year ==
Year	Winner	Club
2009	Kyah Simon	(Australia) Central Coast Mariners
2010	Samantha Kerr	(Australia) Perth Glory
2011	Caitlin Foord	(Australia) Sydney FC
2012	Stephanie Catley	(Australia) Melbourne Victory
2013	Stephanie Catley	(Australia) Melbourne Victory
2014	Samantha Kerr	(Australia) Sydney FC / (United States) Western New York Flash / (Australia) Perth Glory

== See also ==
- List of A-League honours
- PFA Footballer of the Year Awards
