= PFA Footballer of the Year Awards =

Annual top Australian soccer awards

The PFA Footballer of the Year Awards (or the Professional Football Association Footballer of the Year Awards) is an annual award ceremony created to formally recognise the most outstanding Australian soccer players playing abroad or in the A-League, as well as foreign players playing in the A-League. The inaugural ceremony took place on 11 June 2009 in Sydney.

== Alex Tobin OAM Medal ==
The Alex Tobin OAM Medal is selected by the PFA Executive to a current or former player who demonstrates four outstanding attributes: leadership, achievement as a player, commitment to one's fellow professionals, and service and dedication to the game. The medal is named after the PFA's longest-serving president, Alex Tobin.

| Year | Player | Ref |
|---|---|---|
| 2008 | Joe Marston & Johnny Warren | |
| 2009 | Craig Johnston | |
| 2011 | Mark Viduka | |
| 2012 | Frank Farina | |
| 2014 | Mark Schwarzer | |
| 2016 | Harry Kewell | |
| 2017 | Cheryl Salisbury | |
| 2018 | Paul Okon | |
| 2023 | Melissa Barbieri | |
| 2026 | Lydia Williams | |

== Men's Footballer of the Year Award ==
The Men's Footballer of the Year Award is awarded to Australia's best professional player playing overseas or in the A-League. Performances for national teams are also taken into account. The votes are cast monthly by all current male players who are PFA members. A final group of nominees is announced at the end of the season, the player with the highest number of votes becoming the eventual winner.

| Year | Player | Club | Ref |
|---|---|---|---|
| 2009 | Tim Cahill | (England) Everton | |
| 2010 | Mark Schwarzer | (England) Fulham | |
| 2011 | Matt McKay | (Australia) Brisbane Roar (Scotland) Rangers | |
| 2012 | Brett Holman | (Netherlands) AZ | |
| 2013 | Robbie Kruse | (Germany) Fortuna Düsseldorf | |
| 2014 | Mile Jedinak | (England) Crystal Palace | |
| 2015 | Mathew Ryan | (Belgium) Club Brugge | |
| 2016 | Aaron Mooy | (Australia) Melbourne City (England) Manchester City (England) Huddersfield Town | |
| 2017 | Aaron Mooy ^{(2)} | (England) Huddersfield Town | |
| 2018 | Aaron Mooy ^{(3)} | (England) Huddersfield Town | |
| 2019 | Mathew Ryan ^{(2)} | (England) Brighton & Hove Albion | |
| 2020 | Mathew Ryan ^{(3)} | (England) Brighton & Hove Albion | |
| 2021 | Jamie Maclaren | (Australia) Melbourne City | |
| 2022 | Tom Rogic | (Scotland) Celtic | |
| 2023 | Craig Goodwin | (Australia) Adelaide United | |
| 2024 | Jackson Irvine | (Germany) FC St. Pauli | |

== Women's Footballer of the Year Award ==
The PFA Women's Footballer of the Year is voted for by all current women's players who are PFA members, on a 3-2-1 basis.

| Year | Player | Club | Ref |
|---|---|---|---|
| 2010 | Servet Uzunlar | (Australia) Sydney FC | |
| 2011 | Elise Kellond-Knight | (Australia) Brisbane Roar (Denmark) Fortuna Hjørring | |
| 2012 | Lydia Williams | (Australia) Canberra United | |
| 2013 | Sam Kerr | (Australia) Sydney FC (United States) Western New York Flash | |
| 2014 | Katrina Gorry | (Australia) Brisbane Roar (United States) FC Kansas City | |
| 2015 | Elise Kellond-Knight ^{(2)} | (Australia) Brisbane Roar (Germany) Turbine Potsdam | |
| 2016 | Lydia Williams ^{(2)} | (Australia) Canberra United (United States) Houston Dash | |
| 2017 | Sam Kerr ^{(2)} | (Australia) Perth Glory (United States) Sky Blue FC | |
| 2018 | Sam Kerr ^{(3)} | (Australia) Perth Glory (United States) Sky Blue FC (United States) Chicago Red Stars | |
| 2019 | Sam Kerr ^{(4)} | (Australia) Perth Glory (United States) Chicago Red Stars | |
| 2020 | Steph Catley | (England) Arsenal (Australia) Melbourne City | |
| 2021 | Ellie Carpenter | (France) Olympique Lyonnais | |
| 2022 | Sam Kerr ^{(5)} | (England) Chelsea | |
| 2023 | Sam Kerr ^{(6)} | (England) Chelsea | |
| 2024 | Steph Catley ^{(2)} | (England) Arsenal | |

== Harry Kewell Medal ==
The Harry Kewell Medal is awarded to Australia's best male professional Under-23 player playing overseas or player of any nationality playing in the A-League. Performances for national teams are also taken into account. The votes are cast monthly by all current male players who are PFA members. A final group of nominees is announced at the end of the season, the player with the highest number of votes becoming the eventual winner. The medal is named after one of Australia's most famous and successful players, Harry Kewell.

| Year | Player | Club | Ref |
|---|---|---|---|
| 2009 | Nikita Rukavytsya | (Australia) Perth Glory | |
| 2010 | Mitch Langerak | (Australia) Melbourne Victory | |
| 2011 | Robbie Kruse | (Australia) Melbourne Victory | |
| 2012 | Mathew Ryan | (Australia) Central Coast Mariners | |
| 2013 | Marco Rojas | (Australia) Melbourne Victory | |
| 2014 | Mathew Ryan ^{(2)} | (Belgium) Club Brugge | |
| 2015 | Mathew Ryan ^{(3)} | (Belgium) Club Brugge | |
| 2016 | Jamie Maclaren | (Australia) Brisbane Roar | |
| 2017 | Alex Gersbach | (Norway) Rosenborg | |
| 2018 | Daniel Arzani | (Australia) Melbourne City | |
| 2019 | Chris Ikonomidis | (Australia) Perth Glory | |
| 2020 | Liberato Cacace | (New Zealand) Wellington Phoenix | |
| 2021 | Connor Metcalfe | (Australia) Melbourne City | |
| 2022 | Denis Genreau | (France) Toulouse | |
| 2023 | Jordan Bos | (Australia) Melbourne City | |
| 2024 | Alex Paulsen | (New Zealand) Wellington Phoenix | |
| 2025 | Nicolas Milanovic | (Scotland) Aberdeen FC | |

== Young Women's Footballer of the Year Award ==
| Year | Player | Club | Ref |
|---|---|---|---|
| 2017 | Alex Chidiac | (Australia) Adelaide United | |
| 2018 | Alex Chidiac ^{(2)} | (Australia) Adelaide United | |
| 2019 | Karly Roestbakken | (Australia) Canberra United | |
| 2020 | Ellie Carpenter | (Australia) Melbourne City (United States) Portland Thorns | |
| 2021 | Ellie Carpenter ^{(2)} | (France) Olympique Lyonnais | |
| 2022 | Mary Fowler | (France) Montpellier | |
| 2023 | Charlotte Grant | (Sweden) Vittsjö | |
| 2024 | Mary Fowler ^{(2)} | (England) Manchester City | |

== PFA Community Medal ==
| Year | Player | Club | Ref |
|---|---|---|---|
| 2017 | Robert Cornthwaite | (Australia) Western Sydney Wanderers | |
| 2018 | Nigel Boogaard | (Australia) Newcastle Jets | |
| 2020 | Luke Brattan | (Australia) Sydney FC | |
| 2022 | Rebekah Stott | (Australia) Melbourne City | |
| 2023 | Aivi Luik | (Sweden) BK Häcken | |
| 2024 | Alex Chidiac | (Australia) Melbourne Victory | |

== A-League Men Team of the Season ==
The A-League Men Team of the Season is awarded to the league's best players selected in a 4-3-3 formation with the best coach also selected. The team is selected by the PFA Awards Committee, a group of former Socceroos, football analysts and journalists.

=== 2008–09 ===
| GK | (Australia) Eugene Galekovic | Adelaide United |
| RB | (Australia) Tarek Elrich | Newcastle Jets |
| CB | (Australia) Craig Moore | Brisbane Roar |
| CB | (Australia) Sasa Ognenovski | Adelaide United |
| LB | (Australia) Scott Jamieson | Adelaide United |
| DM | (Australia) Mile Jedinak | Central Coast Mariners |
| AM | (Australia) Travis Dodd | Adelaide United |
| AM | (Scotland) Charlie Miller | Brisbane Roar |
| RW | (New Zealand) Shane Smeltz | Wellington Phoenix |
| LW | (Australia) Archie Thompson | Melbourne Victory |
| FW | (Ivory Coast) Eugene Dadi | Perth Glory |

Substitutes:

| GK | (Australia) Michael Theoklitos | Melbourne Victory |
| CB | (Australia) Kevin Muscat | Melbourne Victory |
| DM | (Australia) Paul Reid | Adelaide United |
| CM | (Australia) Billy Celeski | Melbourne Victory |
| FW | (Australia) Nikita Rukavytsya | Perth Glory |

Manager: (Australia) Aurelio Vidmar, Adelaide United

Referee: (Australia) Strebre Delovski

=== 2009–10 ===
| GK | (Australia) Eugene Galekovic | Adelaide United |
| RB | (Australia) Matthew Kemp | Melbourne Victory |
| CB | (Australia) Simon Colosimo | Sydney FC |
| CB | (Australia) Kevin Muscat | Melbourne Victory |
| LB | (Australia) Dean Heffernan | Central Coast Mariners |
| CM | (Australia) Jason Culina | Gold Coast United |
| CM | (Australia) Matt Thompson | Newcastle Jets |
| AM | (Costa Rica) Carlos Hernández | Melbourne Victory |
| RW | (Australia) Archie Thompson | Melbourne Victory |
| LW | (Australia) Alex Brosque | Sydney FC |
| FW | (New Zealand) Shane Smeltz | Gold Coast United |

Substitutes:

| GK | (Australia) Danny Vukovic | Central Coast Mariners |
| CB | (Australia) Nikolai Topor-Stanley | Newcastle Jets |
| LW | (Australia) Tommy Oar | Brisbane Roar |
| AM | (Australia) Steve Corica | Sydney FC |
| RW | (Barbados) Paul Ifill | Wellington Phoenix |

Manager: (Czech Republic) Vitezslav Lavicka, Sydney FC

Referee: (Australia) Strebre Delovski

=== 2010–11 ===
| GK | (Australia) Michael Theoklitos | Brisbane Roar |
| RB | (Australia) Ivan Franjic | Brisbane Roar |
| CB | (Australia) Matt Smith | Brisbane Roar |
| CB | (Australia) Luke DeVere | Brisbane Roar |
| LB | (Brazil) Cássio | Adelaide United |
| AM | (Argentina) Marcos Flores | Adelaide United |
| CM | (Australia) Matt McKay (captain) | Brisbane Roar |
| AM | (Germany) Thomas Broich | Brisbane Roar |
| RW | (New Zealand) Kosta Barbarouses | Brisbane Roar |
| LW | (Australia) Robbie Kruse | Melbourne Victory |
| FW | (Indonesia) Sergio van Dijk | Adelaide United |

Substitutes:

| GK | (New Zealand) Glen Moss | Gold Coast United |
| LB | (Australia) Joshua Rose | Central Coast Mariners |
| CM | (Australia) Kasey Wehrman | Newcastle Jets |
| AM | (Costa Rica) Carlos Hernández | Melbourne Victory |
| FW | (Costa Rica) Jean Carlos Solórzano | Brisbane Roar |

Manager: (Australia) Ange Postecoglou, Brisbane Roar

Referee: (Australia) Gerard Parsons

=== 2011–12 ===
| GK | (Australia) Mathew Ryan | Central Coast Mariners |
| RB | (Australia) Michael Marrone | Melbourne Heart |
| CB | (Netherlands) Patrick Zwaanswijk | Central Coast Mariners |
| LB | (Australia) Joshua Rose | Central Coast Mariners |
| CM | (Brazil) Fred | Melbourne Heart |
| CM | (Australia) Mitch Nichols | Brisbane Roar |
| AM | (Germany) Thomas Broich | Brisbane Roar |
| AM | (Australia) Aziz Behich | Melbourne Heart |
| RW | (Barbados) Paul Ifill | Wellington Phoenix |
| LW | (Australia) Archie Thompson | Melbourne Victory |
| FW | (Albania) Besart Berisha | Brisbane Roar |

Substitutes:

| GK | (Australia) Clint Bolton | Melbourne Heart |
| CD | (Australia) Andrew Durante | Wellington Phoenix |
| CM | (Australia) Nicky Carle | Sydney FC |
| AM | (Costa Rica) Carlos Hernández | Melbourne Victory |
| FW | (Australia) Harry Kewell | Melbourne Victory |

Manager: (Australia) Graham Arnold, Central Coast Mariners

Referee: (Australia) Strebre Delovski

=== 2012–13 ===
| GK | (Australia) Ante Covic | Western Sydney Wanderers |
| RB | (Germany) Jérome Polenz | Western Sydney Wanderers |
| CB | (Australia) Trent Sainsbury | Central Coast Mariners |
| CB | (Australia) Nikolai Topor-Stanley | Western Sydney Wanderers |
| LB | (Ivory Coast) Adama Traore | Melbourne Victory |
| CM | (Australia) Mark Milligan | Melbourne Victory |
| AM | (Japan) Shinji Ono | Western Sydney Wanderers |
| AM | (New Zealand) Michael McGlinchey | Central Coast Mariners |
| RW | (New Zealand) Jeremy Brockie | Wellington Phoenix |
| LW | (New Zealand) Marco Rojas | Melbourne Victory |
| FW | (Italy) Alessandro Del Piero | Sydney FC |

Substitutes:

| GK | (Australia) Eugene Galekovic | Adelaide United |
| CB | (Australia) Michael Thwaite | Perth Glory |
| AM | (Argentina) Marcelo Carrusca | Adelaide United |
| FW | (Australia) Archie Thompson | Melbourne Victory |
| FW | (Australia) Daniel McBreen | Central Coast Mariners |

Manager: (Australia) Tony Popovic, Western Sydney Wanderers

Referee: (Australia) Strebre Delovski

=== 2013–14 ===
| GK | (Australia) Eugene Galekovic | Adelaide United |
| RB | (Australia) Ivan Franjic | Brisbane Roar |
| CB | (Australia) Matt Smith | Brisbane Roar |
| CB | (Australia) Matthew Spiranovic | Western Sydney Wanderers |
| LB | (Ivory Coast) Adama Traoré | Melbourne Victory |
| CM | (Australia) Luke Brattan | Brisbane Roar |
| AM | (Germany) Thomas Broich | Brisbane Roar |
| AM | (Argentina) Marcelo Carrusca | Adelaide United |
| FW | (Australia) Adam Taggart | Newcastle Jets |
| FW | (Albania) Besart Berisha | Brisbane Roar |
| FW | (Australia) David Williams | Melbourne Heart |

Substitutes:

| GK | (Australia) Danny Vukovic | Perth Glory |
| CB | (Australia) Osama Malik | Adelaide United |
| CM | (Australia) Mark Milligan | Melbourne Victory |
| AM | (Costa Rica) Carlos Hernández | Wellington Phoenix |
| FW | (Belgium) Stein Huysegems | Wellington Phoenix |

Manager: (England) Mike Mulvey, Brisbane Roar

Referee: (Australia) Strebre Delovski

=== 2014–15 ===
| GK | (Australia) Eugene Galekovic | Adelaide United |
| RB | (Australia) Tarek Elrich | Adelaide United |
| CB | (France) Matthieu Delpierre | Melbourne Victory |
| CB | (New Zealand) Andrew Durante | Wellington Phoenix |
| LB | (Australia) Scott Jamieson | Perth Glory |
| CM | (Australia) Mark Milligan | Melbourne Victory |
| AM | (Australia) Aaron Mooy | Melbourne City |
| AM | (Argentina) Marcelo Carrusca | Adelaide United |
| FW | (Tunisia) Fahid Ben Khalfallah | Melbourne Victory |
| FW | (Austria) Marc Janko | Sydney FC |
| FW | (Australia) Nathan Burns | Wellington Phoenix |

Substitutes:

| GK | (Australia) Danny Vukovic | Perth Glory |
| CB | (Australia) Nigel Boogaard | Adelaide United |
| CM | (Serbia) Miloš Dimitrijević | Sydney FC |
| FW | (Albania) Besart Berisha | Melbourne Victory |
| AM | (Brazil) Guilherme Finkler | Melbourne Victory |

=== 2015–16 ===
Only one player from the two finalists (Adelaide United and Western Sydney Wanderers) were picked for the starting XI.

| GK | (Denmark) Thomas Sørensen | Melbourne City |
| RB | (Australia) Josh Risdon | Perth Glory |
| CB | (Australia) Jade North | Brisbane Roar |
| CB | (France) Matthieu Delpierre | Melbourne Victory |
| LB | (Australia) Scott Jamieson | Western Sydney Wanderers |
| MF | (Spain) Corona | Brisbane Roar |
| MF | (Australia) Aaron Mooy | Melbourne City |
| MF | (Spain) Diego Castro | Perth Glory |
| FW | (Australia) Jamie Maclaren | Brisbane Roar |
| FW | (Uruguay) Bruno Fornaroli | Melbourne City |
| FW | (Martinique) Harry Novillo | Melbourne City |

Substitutes:

| GK | (Australia) Mark Birighitti | Newcastle Jets |
| CB | (Australia) Nikolai Topor-Stanley | Western Sydney Wanderers |
| MF | (Australia) Mitch Nichols | Western Sydney Wanderers |
| MF | (Netherlands) Roly Bonevacia | Wellington Phoenix |
| FW | (New Zealand) Kosta Barbarouses | Melbourne Victory |

Manager: (Spain) Guillermo Amor, Adelaide United

Referee: (Australia) Strebre Delovski

Venue of the season: Etihad Stadium

=== 2016–17 ===
| GK | (Australia) Danny Vukovic (c) | Sydney FC |
| RB | (Australia) Rhyan Grant | Sydney FC |
| CB | (Australia) Alex Wilkinson | Sydney FC |
| CB | (Denmark) Michael Jakobsen | Melbourne City |
| LB | (Australia) Michael Zullo | Sydney FC |
| MF | (Australia) Brandon O'Neill | Sydney FC |
| MF | (Serbia) Miloš Ninković | Sydney FC |
| MF | (Australia) James Troisi | Melbourne Victory |
| RW | (New Zealand) Marco Rojas | Melbourne Victory |
| LW | (Spain) Diego Castro | Perth Glory |
| FW | (Kosovo) Besart Berisha | Melbourne Victory |

Substitutes:

| GK | (Australia) Liam Reddy | Perth Glory |
| CB | (Australia) Jade North | Brisbane Roar |
| CB | (Australia) Joshua Brillante | Sydney FC |
| FW | (Uruguay) Bruno Fornaroli | Melbourne City |
| FW | (Australia) Alex Brosque (c) | Sydney FC |
| CB | (Australia) Ruon Tongyik (U20) | Melbourne City |
| MF | (Australia) Riley McGree (U20) | Adelaide United |

Manager: (Australia) Graham Arnold, Sydney FC

=== 2017–18 ===
| GK | (England) Jamie Young | Brisbane Roar |
| RB | (Australia) Luke Wilkshire | Sydney FC |
| CB | (Australia) Alex Wilkinson | Sydney FC |
| CB | (Australia) Rhys Williams | Melbourne Victory |
| LB | (Australia) Michael Zullo | Sydney FC |
| MF | (Australia) Joshua Brillante | Sydney FC |
| MF | (Australia) Luke Brattan | Melbourne City |
| MF | (Australia) Dimitri Petratos | Newcastle Jets |
| RW | (Poland) Adrian Mierzejewski | Sydney FC |
| LW | (Netherlands) Leroy George | Melbourne Victory |
| FW | (Brazil) Bobô | Sydney FC |

Substitutes:

| GK | (Australia) Andrew Redmayne | Sydney FC |
| CB | (Netherlands) Bart Schenkeveld | Melbourne City |
| MF | (Spain) Isaías | Adelaide United |
| MF | (Serbia) Miloš Ninković | Sydney FC |
| FW | (Australia) Andrew Nabbout | Newcastle Jets |
| CB | (Australia) Thomas Deng (U23) | Melbourne Victory |
| MF | (Australia) Daniel Arzani (U23) | Melbourne City |

Manager: (Australia) Graham Arnold, Sydney FC

=== 2018–19 ===
| GK | (Poland) Filip Kurto | Wellington Phoenix |
| RB | (Australia) Rhyan Grant | Sydney FC |
| CB | (Netherlands) Bart Schenkeveld | Melbourne City |
| CB | (Australia) Shane Lowry | Perth Glory |
| LB | (Australia) Jason Davidson | Perth Glory |
| MF | (Australia) Neil Kilkenny | Perth Glory |
| MF | (Australia) Brandon O'Neill | Sydney FC |
| MF | (Spain) Diego Castro (c) | Perth Glory |
| RW | (Fiji) Roy Krishna | Wellington Phoenix |
| LW | (Australia) Chris Ikonomidis | Perth Glory |
| FW | (Sweden) Ola Toivonen | Melbourne Victory |

Substitutes:

| GK | (Australia) Liam Reddy | Perth Glory |
| CB | (Denmark) Michael Jakobsen | Adelaide United |
| MF | (Spain) Isaías | Adelaide United |
| MF | (Serbia) Miloš Ninković | Sydney FC |
| FW | (England) Adam Le Fondre | Sydney FC |

Manager: (Australia) Tony Popovic, Perth Glory

=== 2019–20 ===
| GK | (England) Jamie Young | Brisbane Roar |
| RB | (Australia) Rhyan Grant | Sydney FC |
| CB | (Australia) Alex Wilkinson | Sydney FC |
| CB | (Denmark) Michael Jakobsen | Adelaide United |
| LB | (New Zealand) Liberato Cacace | Wellington Phoenix |
| MF | (Mexico) Ulises Dávila | Wellington Phoenix |
| MF | (Australia) Luke Brattan | Sydney FC |
| MF | (Italy) Alessandro Diamanti | Western United |
| RW | (Kosovo) Besart Berisha | Western United |
| LW | (England) Adam Le Fondre | Sydney FC |
| FW | (Australia) Jamie Maclaren (c) | Melbourne City |

Substitutes:

| GK | (Australia) Paul Izzo | Adelaide United |
| CB | (England) Steven Taylor | Wellington Phoenix |
| MF | (Serbia) Miloš Ninković | Sydney FC |
| MF | (Australia) Riley McGree | Adelaide United |
| FW | (Australia) Mitchell Duke | Western Sydney Wanderers |

Manager: (Australia) Ufuk Talay, Wellington Phoenix

=== 2020–21 ===
| GK | (Australia) Adam Federici | Macarthur FC |
| RB | (Australia) Rhyan Grant | Sydney FC |
| CB | (Australia) Ruon Tongyik | Central Coast Mariners |
| CB | (Australia) Curtis Good | Melbourne City |
| LB | (Australia) Scott Jamieson | Melbourne City |
| MF | (Mexico) Ulises Dávila | Wellington Phoenix |
| MF | (Australia) Oliver Bozanic | Central Coast Mariners |
| MF | (Australia) Connor Metcalfe | Melbourne City |
| RW | (England) Matt Derbyshire | Macarthur FC |
| LW | (England) Craig Noone | Melbourne City |
| FW | (Australia) Jamie Maclaren (c) | Melbourne City |

Substitutes:

| GK | (Australia) Mark Birighitti | Central Coast Mariners |
| CB | (Australia) Ryan McGowan | Sydney FC |
| RB | (Australia) Ryan Strain | Adelaide United |
| MF | (Serbia) Miloš Ninković | Sydney FC |
| MF | (Republic of Ireland) Jay O'Shea | Brisbane Roar |
| MF | (Australia) Luke Brattan | Sydney FC |
| FW | (Australia) Matt Simon | Central Coast Mariners |

Manager: (Australia) Patrick Kisnorbo, Melbourne City

=== 2021–22 ===
| GK | (Australia) Mark Birighitti | Central Coast Mariners |
| RB | (Australia) Jason Geria | Melbourne Victory |
| CB | (Switzerland) Léo Lacroix | Western United |
| CB | (Australia) Curtis Good | Melbourne City |
| LB | (Australia) Jason Davidson | Melbourne Victory |
| MF | (France) Florin Berenguer | Melbourne City |
| MF | (Australia) Joshua Brillante (c) | Melbourne Victory |
| MF | (Australia) Jake Brimmer | Melbourne Victory |
| RW | (Australia) Nick D'Agostino | Melbourne Victory |
| LW | (Australia) Craig Goodwin | Adelaide United |
| FW | (Australia) Jamie Maclaren | Melbourne City |

Substitutes:

| GK | (England) Jamie Young | Western United |
| LB | (Australia) Ben Garuccio | Western United |
| RB | (Spain) Javi López | Adelaide United |
| MF | (Australia) Connor Metcalfe | Melbourne City |
| MF | (Mexico) Ulises Dávila | Macarthur FC |
| MF | (Brazil) Daniel Penha | Newcastle Jets |
| MF | (Australia) Neil Kilkenny | Western United |

Manager: (Australia) Tony Popovic, Melbourne Victory

=== 2022–23 ===
| GK | (Australia) Joe Gauci | Adelaide United |
| CB | (Brazil) Marcelo | Western Sydney Wanderers |
| CB | (Vanuatu) Brian Kaltak | Central Coast Mariners |
| CB | (Australia) Jordan Bos (c) | Melbourne City |
| RM | (Australia) Aiden O'Neill | Melbourne City |
| CM | (Australia) Josh Nisbet | Central Coast Mariners |
| CM | (Australia) Calem Nieuwenhof | Western Sydney Wanderers |
| LM | (Australia) Mathew Leckie | Melbourne City |
| RW | (Australia) Brandon Borrello | Western Sydney Wanderers |
| FW | (Australia) Jamie Maclaren | Melbourne City |
| LW | (Australia) Craig Goodwin | Adelaide United |

Substitutes:

| GK | (Australia) Lawrence Thomas | Western Sydney Wanderers |
| CB | (Australia) Curtis Good | Melbourne City |
| CB | (Australia) Nectarios Triantis | Central Coast Mariners |
| MF | (Republic of Ireland) Jay O'Shea | Brisbane Roar |
| MF | (Brazil) Marco Túlio | Central Coast Mariners |
| FW | (Australia) Jason Cummings | Central Coast Mariners |
| FW | (Australia) Marco Tilio | Melbourne City |

=== 2023–24 ===
| GK | (New Zealand) Alex Paulsen (c) | Wellington Phoenix |
| RB | (New Zealand) Tim Payne | Wellington Phoenix |
| CB | (England) Scott Wootton | Wellington Phoenix |
| CB | (Vanuatu) Brian Kaltak | Central Coast Mariners |
| LB | (Australia) Jacob Farrell | Central Coast Mariners |
| CM | (Australia) Josh Nisbet | Central Coast Mariners |
| CM | (New Zealand) Alex Rufer | Wellington Phoenix |
| CM | (Germany) Tolgay Arslan | Melbourne City |
| RW | (England) Joe Lolley | Sydney FC |
| FW | (Australia) Adam Taggart | Perth Glory |
| LW | (Australia) Bruno Fornaroli | Melbourne Victory |

Substitutes:

| GK | (Australia) Danny Vukovic | Central Coast Mariners |
| CB | (France) Damien Da Silva | Melbourne Victory |
| CB | (Brazil) Marcelo | Western Sydney Wanderers |
| MF | (Australia) Jake Girdwood-Reich | Sydney FC |
| MF | (Australia) Anthony Caceres | Sydney FC |
| WI | (New Zealand) Kosta Barbarouses | Wellington Phoenix |
| FW | (Australia) Apostolos Stamatelopoulos | Newcastle Jets |

Manager: (Australia) Giancarlo Italiano, Wellington Phoenix

=== 2024–25 ===
| GK | (New Zealand) Alex Paulsen (c) | Auckland FC |
| RB | (Japan) Hiroki Sakai | Auckland FC |
| CB | (Australia) Nathaniel Atkinson | Melbourne City |
| CB | (Australia) Kai Trewin | Melbourne City |
| LB | (New Zealand) Francis de Vries | Auckland FC |
| CM | (Belgium) Louis Verstraete | Auckland FC |
| CM | (Australia) Ryan Teague | Melbourne Victory |
| CM | (Australia) Angus Thurgate | Western United |
| RW | (Australia) Nicolas Milanovic | Western Sydney Wanderers |
| FW | (Australia) Archie Goodwin | Adelaide United |
| LW | (Australia) Adrian Segecic | Sydney FC |

Substitutes:

| GK | (Australia) Lawrence Thomas | Western Sydney Wanderers |
| LB | (Australia) Aziz Behich | Melbourne City |
| CB | (New Zealand) Nando Pijnaker | Auckland FC |
| MF | (Australia) Anthony Caceres | Sydney FC |
| WI | (Australia) Marco Tilio | Melbourne City |
| FW | (Australia) Noah Botic | Western United |
| FW | (Uruguay) Guillermo May | Auckland FC |

Manager: (Australia) Steve Corica, Auckland FC

=== 2025–26 ===
| GK | (New Zealand) Harrison Devenish-Meares (c) | Sydney FC |
| RB | (Australia) Nathaniel Atkinson | Melbourne City |
| CB | (Australia) Panagiotis Kikianis | Adelaide United |
| CB | (Australia) Mark Natta | Newcastle Jets |
| LB | (New Zealand) Francis de Vries | Auckland FC |
| CM | (Australia) Ethan Alagich | Adelaide United |
| CM | (Spain) Juan Mata | Melbourne Victory |
| CM | (Australia) Max Burgess | Newcastle Jets |
| RW | (Australia) Clayton Taylor | Newcastle Jets |
| FW | (England) Sam Cosgrove | Auckland FC |
| LW | (New Zealand) Jesse Randall | Auckland FC |

Substitutes:

| GK | (Australia) James Delianov | Newcastle Jets |
| LB | (Australia) Daniel Wilmering | Newcastle Jets |
| LB | (Australia) Aziz Behich | Melbourne City |
| CM | (New Zealand) Lachlan Bayliss | Newcastle Jets |
| DM | (Australia) Paul Okon-Engstler | Sydney FC |
| WI | (Australia) Eli Adams | Newcastle Jets |
| WI | (Australia) Marcus Younis | Melbourne City |

== A-League Women Team of the Season ==
=== 2016–17 ===
| GK | (Australia) Lydia Williams | Melbourne City |
| DF | (Australia) Steph Catley | Melbourne City |
| DF | (Australia) Alanna Kennedy | Sydney FC |
| DF | (Australia) Clare Polkinghorne | Brisbane Roar |
| DF | (United States) Megan Oyster | Newcastle Jets |
| DF | (Japan) Yukari Kinga | Canberra United |
| MF | (Wales) Jess Fishlock | Melbourne City |
| MF | (Australia) Katrina Gorry | Brisbane Roar |
| FW | (Australia) Sam Kerr (captain) | Perth Glory |
| FW | (England) Natasha Dowie | Melbourne Victory |
| FW | (Australia) Ashleigh Sykes | Canberra United |

Substitutes:

| GK | (Australia) Jada Whyman | Western Sydney Wanderers |
| DF | (Australia) Kim Carroll | Perth Glory |
| MF | (United States) Christine Nairn | Melbourne Victory |
| FW | (Australia) Adriana Jones | Adelaide United |
| FW | (Australia) Alex Chidiac | Adelaide United |

Referee: Kate Jacewicz

=== 2017–18 ===
| GK | (Australia) Mackenzie Arnold | Brisbane Roar |
| DF | (Australia) Steph Catley | Melbourne City |
| DF | (United States) Lauren Barnes | Melbourne City |
| DF | (Australia) Clare Polkinghorne (captain) | Brisbane Roar |
| DF | (United States) Carson Pickett | Brisbane Roar |
| MF | (Australia) Katrina Gorry | Brisbane Roar |
| MF | (Wales) Jess Fishlock | Melbourne City |
| MF | (Australia) Emily van Egmond | Newcastle Jets |
| FW | (Australia) Caitlin Foord | Sydney FC |
| FW | (Australia) Sam Kerr | Perth Glory |
| FW | (Australia) Hayley Raso | Brisbane Roar |

Substitutes:

| GK | (United States) Aubrey Bledsoe | Sydney FC |
| DF | (United States) Emily Sonnett | Sydney FC |
| MF | (Australia) Chloe Logarzo | Sydney FC |
| FW | (United States) Rachel Hill | Perth Glory |
| FW | (United States) Katie Stengel | Newcastle Jets |

=== 2018–19 ===
| GK | (Australia) Eliza Campbell | Perth Glory |
| DF | (Australia) Steph Catley | Melbourne City |
| DF | (Australia) Alanna Kennedy | Sydney FC |
| DF | (Australia) Clare Polkinghorne | Brisbane Roar |
| DF | (United States) Katie Naughton | Perth Glory |
| MF | (Australia) Caitlin Foord | Sydney FC |
| MF | (United States) Nikki Stanton | Perth Glory |
| MF | (United States) Christine Nairn | Melbourne Victory |
| MF | (United States) Rachel Hill | Perth Glory |
| FW | (Japan) Yuki Nagasato | Brisbane Roar |
| FW | (Australia) Sam Kerr (captain) | Perth Glory |

Substitutes:

| GK | (Australia) Sarah Willacy | Adelaide United |
| DF | (Australia) Jenna McCormick | Brisbane Roar |
| MF | (United States) Danielle Colaprico | Sydney FC |
| FW | (United States) Veronica Latsko | Adelaide United |

Coach: (Wales) Jeff Hopkins, Melbourne Victory

=== 2019–20 ===
| GK | (Australia) Casey Dumont | Melbourne Victory |
| RB | (Australia) Ellie Carpenter (captain) | Melbourne City |
| CB | (Australia) Clare Polkinghorne | Brisbane Roar |
| CB | (New Zealand) Rebekah Stott | Melbourne City |
| LB | (Australia) Steph Catley | Melbourne City |
| MF | (United States) Darian Jenkins | Melbourne Victory |
| MF | (Australia) Aivi Luik | Melbourne City |
| MF | (Australia) Emily van Egmond | Melbourne City |
| MF | (United States) Kristen Hamilton | Western Sydney Wanderers |
| FW | (Australia) Kyah Simon | Melbourne City |
| FW | (England) Natasha Dowie | Melbourne Victory |

Substitutes:

| GK | (Australia) Sarah Willacy | Adelaide United |
| DF | (Australia) Angela Beard | Melbourne Victory |
| MF | (United States) Morgan Andrews | Perth Glory |
| FW | (United States) Mallory Weber | Adelaide United |
| FW | (United States) Lynn Williams | Western Sydney Wanderers |

Coach: (Australia) Rado Vidosic, Melbourne City

=== 2020–21 ===
| GK | (Argentina) Gaby Garton | Melbourne Victory |
| RB | (Australia) Angela Beard | Melbourne Victory |
| CB | (Australia) Clare Polkinghorne | Brisbane Roar |
| CB | (United States) Kayla Morrison | Melbourne Victory |
| LB | (Australia) Jamilla Rankin | Brisbane Roar |
| MF | (Australia) Teresa Polias | Sydney FC |
| MF | (Australia) Tameka Yallop | Brisbane Roar |
| MF | (Australia) Kyra Cooney-Cross (captain) | Melbourne Victory |
| FW | (Australia) Emily Gielnik | Brisbane Roar |
| FW | (Australia) Michelle Heyman | Canberra United |
| FW | (Australia) Lisa De Vanna | Melbourne Victory |

Substitutes:

| GK | (Australia) Teagan Micah | Melbourne City |
| DF | (United States) Kendall Fletcher | Canberra United |
| DF | (Australia) Cortnee Vine | Sydney FC |
| MF | (Australia) Clare Wheeler | Sydney FC |
| FW | (Australia) Melina Ayres | Melbourne Victory |

Coach: (Wales) Jeff Hopkins, Melbourne Victory

=== 2021–22 ===
| GK | (Australia) Jada Whyman | Sydney FC |
| RB | (Australia) Winonah Heatley | Melbourne City |
| CB | (Australia) Natalie Tobin | Sydney FC |
| CB | (Australia) Kaitlyn Torpey | Melbourne City |
| LB | (New Zealand) Ally Green | Sydney FC |
| MF | (Australia) Mackenzie Hawkesby | Sydney FC |
| MF | (Australia) Rhianna Pollicina | Melbourne City |
| MF | (Australia) Alex Chidiac | Melbourne Victory |
| FW | (Australia) Cortnee Vine (captain) | Sydney FC |
| FW | (England) Fiona Worts | Adelaide United |
| FW | (Australia) Holly McNamara | Melbourne City |

Substitutes:

| GK | (Australia) Melissa Barbieri | Melbourne City |
| DF | (Australia) Clare Hunt | Western Sydney Wanderers |
| MF | (Australia) Katrina Gorry | Brisbane Roar |
| MF | (Australia) Rachel Lowe | Sydney FC |
| MF | (Australia) Taylor Ray | Sydney FC |
| FW | (New Zealand) Hannah Wilkinson | Melbourne City |

Coach: (Australia) Adrian Stenta, Adelaide United

=== 2022–23 ===
| GK | (United States) Hillary Beall | Western United |
| RB | (Australia) Kaitlyn Torpey | Melbourne City |
| CB | (Australia) Natalie Tobin | Sydney FC |
| CB | (Australia) Clare Hunt | Western Sydney Wanderers |
| LB | (Australia) Charlotte McLean | Sydney FC |
| MF | (Australia) Mackenzie Hawkesby | Sydney FC |
| MF | (Australia) Sarah Hunter | Sydney FC |
| MF | (Australia) Alex Chidiac | Melbourne Victory |
| FW | (Australia) Cortnee Vine (captain) | Sydney FC |
| FW | (Australia) Michelle Heyman | Canberra United |
| FW | (United States) Hannah Keane | Western United |

Substitutes:

| GK | (Australia) Jada Whyman | Sydney FC |
| DF | (United States) Kayla Morrison | Melbourne Victory |
| MF | (Australia) Rhianna Pollicina | Melbourne City |
| MF | (Serbia) Vesna Milivojević | Canberra United |
| MF | (Australia) Katrina Gorry | Brisbane Roar |

=== 2023–24 ===
| GK | (Australia) Morgan Aquino | Perth Glory |
| RB | (Australia) Jamilla Rankin | Melbourne Victory |
| CB | (United States) Kayla Morrison | Melbourne Victory |
| CB | (Australia) Charlotte McLean | Sydney FC |
| LB | (New Zealand) Rebekah Stott | Melbourne City |
| MF | (Australia) Rhianna Pollicina | Melbourne City |
| MF | (Serbia) Vesna Milivojević | Canberra United |
| MF | (Australia) Alex Chidiac | Melbourne Victory |
| FW | (Australia) Cortnee Vine | Sydney FC |
| FW | (Australia) Michelle Heyman (captain) | Canberra United |
| FW | (Philippines) Sarina Bolden | Newcastle Jets |

Substitutes:

| GK | (Australia) Jada Whyman | Sydney FC |
| DF | (United States) Taylor Otto | Melbourne City |
| MF | (Australia) Grace Maher | Western United |
| MF | (Australia) Mackenzie Hawkesby | Sydney FC |
| MF | (New Zealand) Macey Fraser | Wellington Phoenix |
| FW | (Australia) Emily Gielnik | Melbourne Victory |

Coach: (Australia) Dario Vidošić, Melbourne City

=== 2024–25 ===
| GK | (New Zealand) Claudia Jenkins | Adelaide United |
| DF | (Australia) Alexia Apostolakis | Melbourne City |
| DF | (United States) Kayla Morrison | Melbourne Victory |
| DF | (United States) Taylor Otto | Melbourne City |
| DF | (New Zealand) Rebekah Stott | Melbourne City |
| MF | (Australia) Laura Hughes | Melbourne City |
| MF | (Australia) Isabel Gomez | Central Coast Mariners |
| MF | (Australia) Tameka Yallop | Brisbane Roar |
| FW | (Republic of Ireland) Erin Healy | Adelaide United |
| FW | (Australia) Holly McNamara (captain) | Melbourne City |
| FW | (Australia) Michelle Heyman | Canberra United |

Substitutes:

| GK | (Australia) Courtney Newbon | Melbourne Victory |
| DF | (Dominican Republic) Lucía León | Adelaide United |
| DF | (Australia) Ella Tonkin | Adelaide United |
| MF | (Australia) Alex Chidiac | Melbourne Victory |
| MF | (New Zealand) Annalie Longo | Wellington Phoenix |
| MF | (Australia) Leticia McKenna | Melbourne City |
| FW | (England) Fiona Worts | Adelaide United |

Coach: (Australia) Michael Matricciani (Melbourne City)

=== 2025–26 ===
The PFA A-League Women's team of the season was announced on 14 May 2026.

| GK | (Australia) Teresa Morrissey | Perth Glory |
| DF | (Australia) Aimee Medwin | Brisbane Roar |
| DF | (New Zealand) Mackenzie Barry | Wellington Phoenix |
| DF | (New Zealand) Rebekah Stott (captain) | Melbourne City |
| DF | (Australia) Ella Tonkin | Adelaide United |
| MF | (New Zealand) Pia Vlok | Wellington Phoenix |
| MF | (Australia) Isabel Gomez | Central Coast Mariners |
| MF | (New Zealand) Grace Jale | Wellington Phoenix |
| FW | (Australia) Holly McNamara | Melbourne City |
| FW | (Australia) Annalise Rasmussen | Central Coast Mariners |
| FW | (England) Brooke Nunn | Wellington Phoenix |

Substitutes:

| GK | (New Zealand) Victoria Esson | Wellington Phoenix |
| DF | (New Zealand) Claudia Bunge | Melbourne Victory |
| DF | (New Zealand) Marisa van der Meer | Wellington Phoenix |
| MF | (Australia) Leticia McKenna | Melbourne City |
| MF | (Australia) Rhianna Pollicina | Melbourne Victory |
| MF | (Australia) Aideen Keane | Melbourne City |
| FW | (Australia) Daisy Brown | Brisbane Roar |

Coach: (England) Bev Priestman (Wellington Phoenix)

== A-League Team of the Decade ==
The Team of the Decade covers the first ten seasons of the A-League. i.e. 2005–06 to 2014–15.

| GK | (Australia) Eugene Galeković |
| RB | (Australia) Ivan Franjić |
| CB | (Australia) Kevin Muscat |
| CB | (Netherlands) Patrick Zwaanswijk |
| LB | (Australia) Cássio |
| MF | (Germany) Thomas Broich |
| MF | (Australia) Matt McKay |
| MF | (Costa Rica) Carlos Hernández |
| FW | (Australia) Archie Thompson |
| FW | (Kosovo) Besart Berisha |
| FW | (New Zealand) Shane Smeltz |

Substitutes

| GK | (Australia) Michael Theo |
| DF | (Ivory Coast) Adama Traoré |
| DF | (Australia) Mark Milligan |
| MF | (Australia) Steve Corica |
| FW | (Italy) Alessandro Del Piero |

Manager: (Australia) Ange Postecoglou

Referee: (Australia) Strebre Delovski

== A-League Men Team of the Second Decade ==
On 1 October 2025, the PFA announced the Team of the Second Decade, covering seasons from 2015–16 to 2024–25.

| GK | (Australia) Danny Vukovic |
| RB | (Australia) Rhyan Grant |
| CB | (Australia) Alex Wilkinson (c) |
| CB | (Australia) Curtis Good |
| LB | (Australia) Scott Jamieson |
| MF | (Serbia) Miloš Ninković |
| MF | (Australia) Luke Brattan |
| MF | (Spain) Diego Castro |
| FW | (New Zealand) Kosta Barbarouses |
| FW | (Australia) Jamie Maclaren |
| FW | (Australia) Craig Goodwin |

Substitutes

| GK | (England) Jamie Young |
| DF | (Australia) Nikolai Topor-Stanley |
| DF | (Australia) Aziz Behich |
| MF | (Australia) Anthony Caceres |
| MF | (Spain) Isaías |
| FW | (Australia) Bruno Fornaroli |
| FW | (Kosovo) Besart Berisha |

Manager: (Australia) Steve Corica

Referee: (Australia) Alex King
