= Mathew Ryan =

Australian footballer (born 1992)

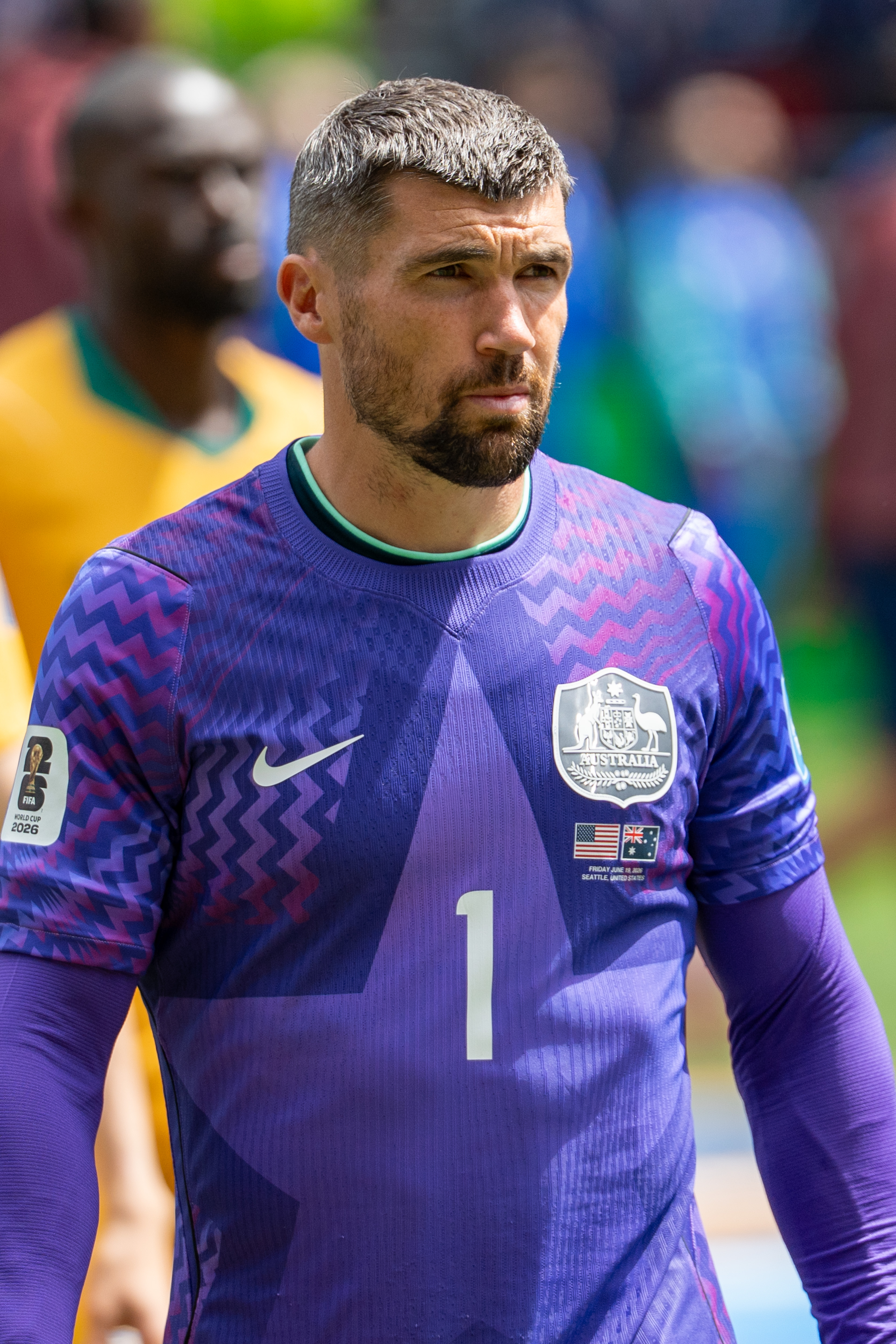
- Ryan with Australia in 2026

Personal information
- Full name: Mathew David Ryan
- Date of birth: 8 April 1992 (age 34)
- Place of birth: Plumpton, New South Wales, Australia
- Height: 1.84 m (6 ft 0 in)
- Position: Goalkeeper

Team information
- Current team: Levante
- Number: 13

Youth career
- 2002–2008: Marconi Stallions
- 2008–2009: Blacktown City

Senior career*
Years	Team	Apps	(Gls)
2009–2010	Blacktown City	11	(0)
2010–2013	Central Coast Mariners	80	(0)
2013–2015	Club Brugge	77	(0)
2015–2017	Valencia	10	(0)
2017	→ Genk (loan)	17	(0)
2017–2021	Brighton & Hove Albion	121	(0)
2021	→ Arsenal (loan)	3	(0)
2021–2022	Real Sociedad	3	(0)
2022–2023	Copenhagen	6	(0)
2023–2024	AZ	47	(0)
2024–2025	Roma	0	(0)
2025	Lens	14	(0)
2025–	Levante	43	(0)

International career^{‡}
2011–2012	Australia U23	6	(0)
2012–	Australia	105	(0)
Medal record
Men's soccer
Representing Australia
AFC Asian Cup
Winner	2015 Australia
- * Club domestic league appearances and goals as of 12 October 2026 ‡ National team caps and goals as of 3 July 2026

Mathew David Ryan (born 8 April 1992) is an Australian professional soccer player who plays as a goalkeeper for La Liga club Levante and captains the Australia national team.

Born in Sydney, Ryan played as a youth for Marconi Stallions, Blacktown City and Central Coast Mariners. He made his senior debut for Blacktown before moving to the Mariners' senior squad in 2010. In 2013, Ryan moved to Club Brugge, where he was named the Belgian Pro League's Goalkeeper of the Year in both his seasons and won the Belgian Cup in 2015. He then played for two years for Valencia in La Liga. He moved to Brighton & Hove Albion in 2017, where he played 121 Premier League games, followed by three on loan at Arsenal in 2021. He subsequently played for several clubs in La Liga, the Danish Superliga, Eredivisie, Serie A and Ligue 1.

Ryan made his senior international debut for Australia in 2012, and has since established himself as his nation's first-choice goalkeeper, effectively succeeding childhood idol and former international goalkeeper Mark Schwarzer. He played at the FIFA World Cup in 2014, 2018, 2022, and 2026, as well as the AFC Asian Cup in 2015, 2019 and 2023, winning the Best Goalkeeper award at the 2015 tournament which his country won on home soil.

== Early life and education ==
Mathew David Ryan was born on 8 April 1992 in Plumpton, New South Wales and attended Westfields Sports High School. He took up football at the age of four and played youth football for Blacktown City and Central Coast Mariners before making his senior debut with Blacktown City. After moving to Central Coast Mariners in 2010, Ryan moved to Club Brugge in 2013.

In addition to holding an Australian passport, Ryan also has a British passport.

== Club career ==
=== Central Coast Mariners ===
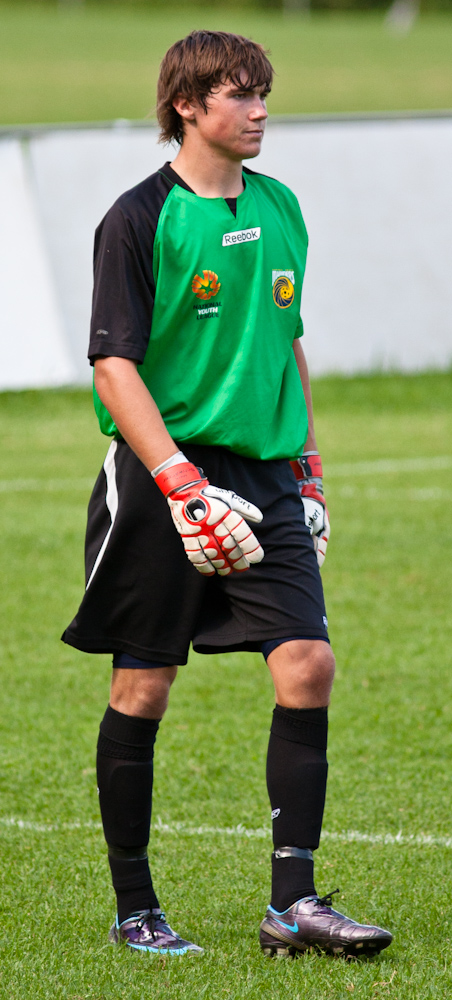
Ryan playing for Central Coast Mariners youth team in 2010

Ryan played for the Central Coast Mariners youth team in the 2009–10 season, and after several call-ups to the senior team, he was given a 3-year senior contract. Despite starting the 2010–11 A-League as the Mariners' substitute keeper, an anterior cruciate ligament injury to first-choice Jess Vanstrattan saw Ryan elevated into the starting eleven. Ryan made his A-League debut for the Mariners on 28 August 2010 in a 1–1 draw against Sydney FC, but fumbled a cross which allowed Rhyan Grant to score Sydney's goal. While coach Graham Arnold was happy with Ryan's debut, there was competition between Ryan and newly-signed Paul Henderson for the regular starting spot. Over the next several months Ryan retained his spot in the starting lineup and earned significant plaudits, including the A-League Young Player of the Month award for December 2010. The Mariners season ended with a penalty shootout loss to Brisbane Roar in the 2011 A-League Grand Final, however, Ryan was awarded the Joe Marston Medal for man of the match in that game. He was also named A-League Young Footballer of the Year for 2010–11.

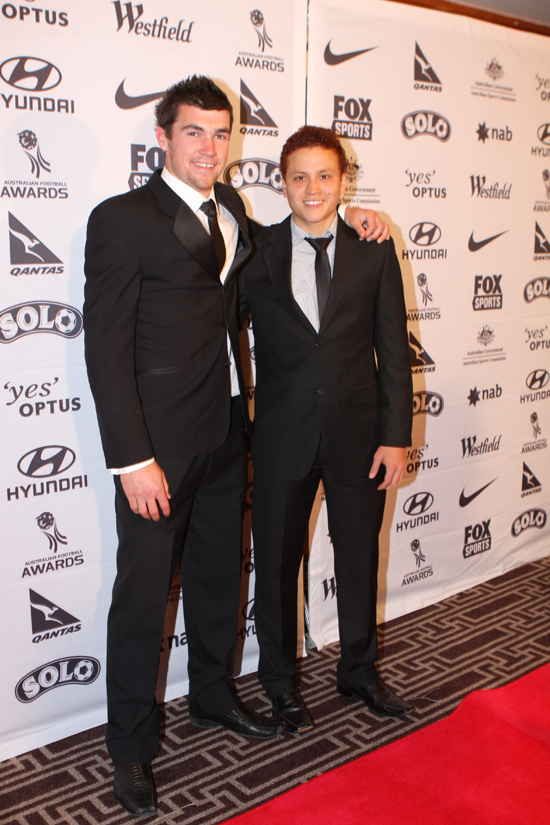
Ryan with Mustafa Amini in 2011

In October 2011, Ryan was named 2011 Male U20 Player of the Year at the FFA Australian Football Awards. He continued to put in a number of strong performances in the 2011–12 A-League, including a man of the match performance in a 1–0 win over Melbourne Heart on 17 January 2012 after pulling off a number of saves. This contributed to Ryan being named A-League Young Player of the Month for January 2012. The Mariners won the 2011–12 Premiership following a win over Wellington Phoenix in the final round of the regular season. However, they were eliminated in the Preliminary Final against Perth Glory on penalties, despite Ryan scoring his penalty in the shootout. In April 2012, Ryan was named A-League Young Footballer of the Year for the second successive season and A-League Goalkeeper of the Year. He was also awarded the Mariners Medal for club player of the season, and named in the PFA's A-League Team of the Season. He was also awarded the Harry Kewell Medal for the outstanding Australian under-23-year-old player in June 2012.

Ryan was again central to the Mariners' 2012–13 A-League season. In November 2012, he was again awarded FFA Male U20 Player of the Year. On 2 March 2012, Ryan took a penalty in a match against Western Sydney Wanderers which was saved by Ante Covic; the Wanderers won the match 1–0 to move above the Mariners on the A-League table. Coach Graham Arnold revealed after the game that Ryan had been practising penalty-taking in the lead-up to that match following a number of missed penalties from other players in the side. The Mariners were victorious in the 2013 A-League Grand Final over the Wanderers, their first win in their four A-League Grand Finals played, with Ryan dedicating the win to the three previous Mariners teams to have lost at that stage.

=== Club Brugge ===
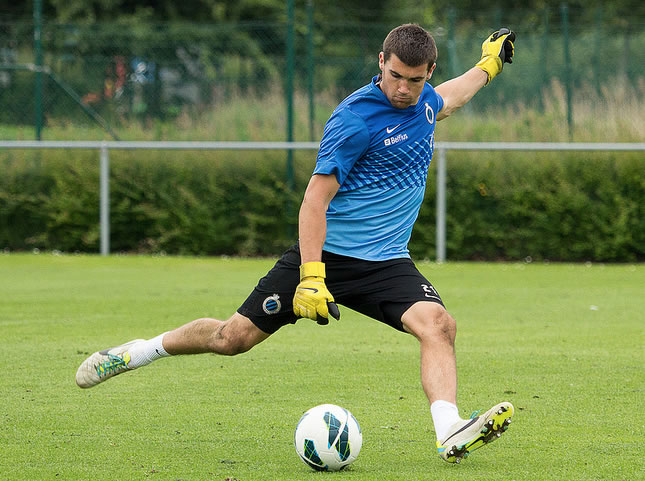
Ryan training with Club Brugge in 2014

It was confirmed on 30 May 2013 that Ryan had completed a move to Belgian Pro League side Club Brugge for an undisclosed fee, despite his contract at Central Coast Mariners expiring the following day. On 27 July 2013 Ryan made his debut for Brugge in the first game of the season at home to Sporting Charleroi and kept a clean sheet in a 2–0 win. In a match against K.A.A. Gent on 23 December 2013 Ryan saved a penalty in the 67th minute that would have resulted in game being level at 2–2. Brugge went on to win the game 3–1 and reports after the match confirmed that Ryan had been offered a new lucrative deal with the club involving a substantial pay increase and contract extension. On 26 November 2014, it was announced that Ryan had agreed to terms with Club Brugge, to extend his contract until 2018.

After a string of fantastic performances, it was reported that European giants Liverpool had sent scouts to the 2015 AFC Asian Cup to watch the goalkeeper. On 22 March 2015, Ryan won the Belgian Cup after keeping the post and helping Club Brugge to a 2–1 victory over Anderlect in the final.

=== Valencia ===
On 21 July 2015, Ryan signed a six-year deal with La Liga side Valencia CF. He was expected to assume the starting goalkeeper role, at least in the medium term, with regular starter Diego Alves out with an anterior cruciate ligament injury. He made his unofficial debut in a friendly against PSV Eindhoven on 25 July 2015. On 22 August 2015, Ryan made his La Liga debut in Valencia's opening game of the season, keeping a clean sheet in a scoreless draw with Rayo Vallecano. His run in the starting side extended until September, when he sustained a meniscus tear in a draw with Deportivo La Coruña, forcing him to have surgery and miss over a month of football. A series of good performances from his replacement, Jaume Domènech, led to suggestions that Ryan would not return to the starting side after his return from injury. Indeed, it was not until late November that Ryan was re-promoted to the starting side for a game against Sevilla. Ryan continued to be rotated with Jaume and the returning Alves for the remainder of the season, eventually making 21 appearances for Valencia in all competitions.

Ryan was back in Valencia's starting lineup for the opening matches of the 2016–17 La Liga, with Alves rumored to be seeking an overseas move. However, Alves stayed at Valencia and Ryan subsequently lost his starting position. By January 2017, a number of clubs were interested in Ryan.

==== Racing Genk (loan) ====
On 30 January 2017, Ryan returned to Belgium after he was loaned to Racing Genk. He entered the starting squad straight away, playing his first match in a 1–0 loss to Oostende in the Belgian Cup on 31 January 2017. Ryan stated in April 2017 that he was not planning to stay in Belgium after the season and would instead return to Valencia. Ryan played a number of games for Genk in multiple competitions, with the side reaching the quarterfinals of the 2016–17 UEFA Europa League, and the final of the Belgian Europa League playoff.

=== Brighton & Hove Albion ===
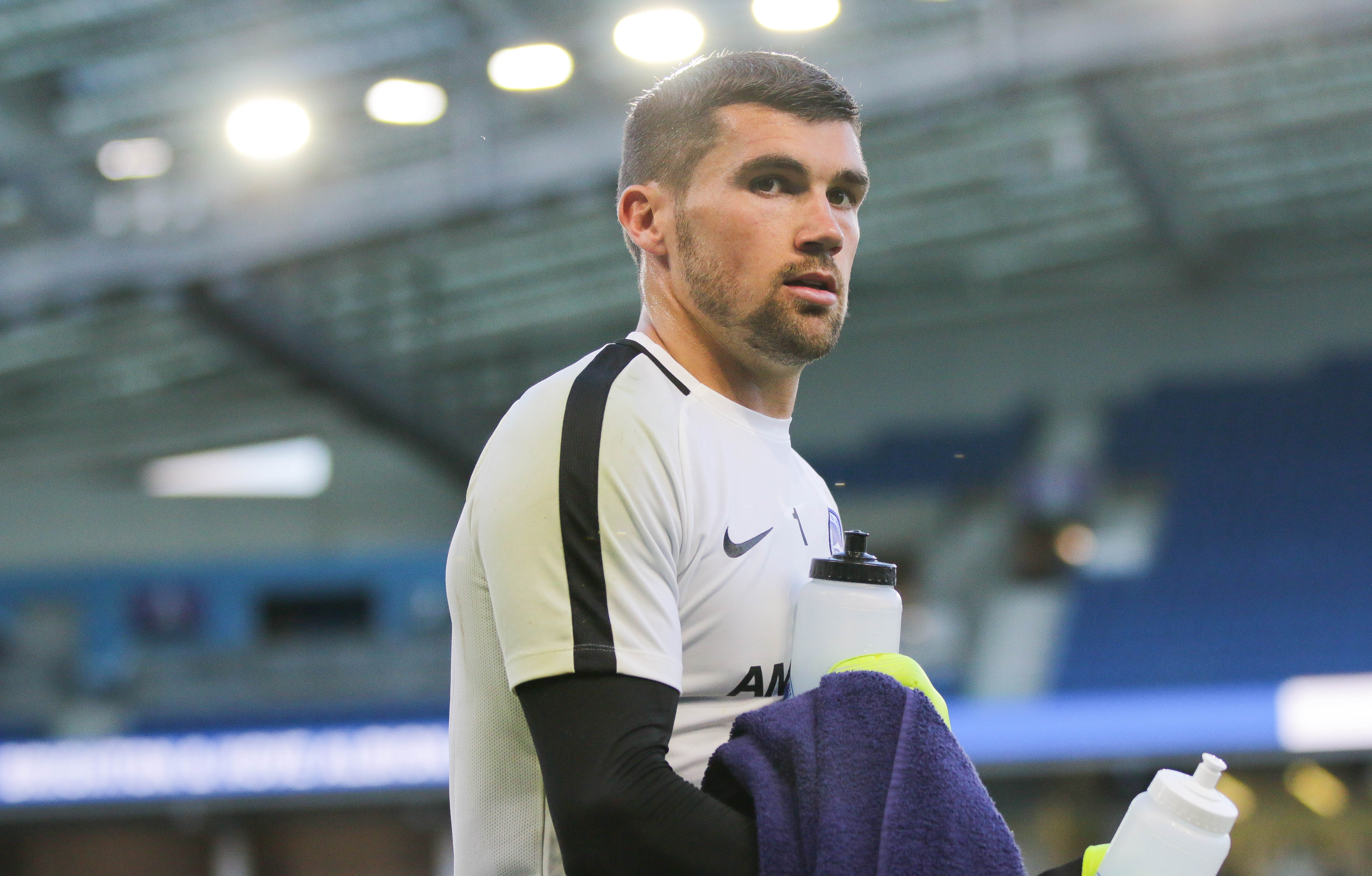
Ryan playing for Brighton in 2018

On 16 June 2017, it was announced that Ryan would sign for newly-promoted Premier League club Brighton & Hove Albion on 1 July 2017 on a five-year contract for an undisclosed fee. He cited the prospect of playing in the Premier League as a main reason for the transfer. Ryan made his debut for Brighton & Hove Albion on 12 August 2017 against Manchester City in a 2–0 defeat. Ryan was in goal for Brighton's first ever Premier League win which came at home against West Brom on 9 September 2017. Ryan played in every single minute of the league in the 2017–18 season keeping 10 clean sheets, one of which coming in a 1–0 home win over Manchester United on 4 May 2018 in which secured Premier League status for the Sussex club.

Ryan kept his first clean sheet of the 2018–19 season in a 1–0 home win over West Ham on the 8th league game of the season. He made two more clean sheets in the next two games, one in a 1–0 away win against Newcastle United and the other in a 1–0 home win against Wolves. In late December and the best part of January Ryan left Brighton for international duty representing Australia in the Asian Cup. His first game back came in a 4–2 away defeat to Fulham on 29 January. He made his FA Cup debut in an eventful match away to Millwall on 17 March. It finished 2–2 with Brighton winning 5–4 on penalties.

==== Arsenal (loan) ====
Ryan was told by Brighton manager Graham Potter in December 2020 that teammate Robert Sánchez would be given an extended run as goalkeeper in the Premier League for the rest of the 2020–21 season and that Ryan would be free to leave in January should the right offer come along.

On 22 January 2021, he joined Arsenal on loan until the end of the season. He was given the number 33 jersey, formerly worn by Matt Macey. On 6 February, Ryan made his debut for Arsenal covering for suspended Bernd Leno in a 1–0 away loss at Aston Villa. It was more than two months until Ryan's next appearance with Leno being dropped to the bench. Ryan conceded a penalty kick from Josh Maja in a 1–1 home draw against a struggling Fulham on 18 April, and played a role in Arsenal's equaliser after going up for a corner. Ryan kept his first Gunners clean sheet in his first win in an Arsenal shirt in a 2–0 away victory at Newcastle United on 2 May, again being chosen over Leno for the second time in four matches.

=== Real Sociedad ===
Ryan joined La Liga side Real Sociedad on undisclosed terms on 12 July 2021. He made his club debut on 23 September, helping the club to a 3–2 away win over Granada.

=== Copenhagen and AZ Alkmaar ===
On 9 August 2022, Ryan joined Superliga side FC Copenhagen on a two-year contract.

Due to a lack of playing time at Copenhagen, he left for Dutch Eredivisie club AZ Alkmaar on 9 January 2023, signing a contract until June 2024.

=== Roma ===
On 17 July 2024, Ryan joined Serie A club Roma. He was signed primarily to serve as a backup goalkeeper for Mile Svilar. After five months of not playing for the club, Ryan finally made his debut, starting as the goalkeeper in a 4–1 victory against Sampdoria in the 2024–25 Coppa Italia in December.

=== Lens ===
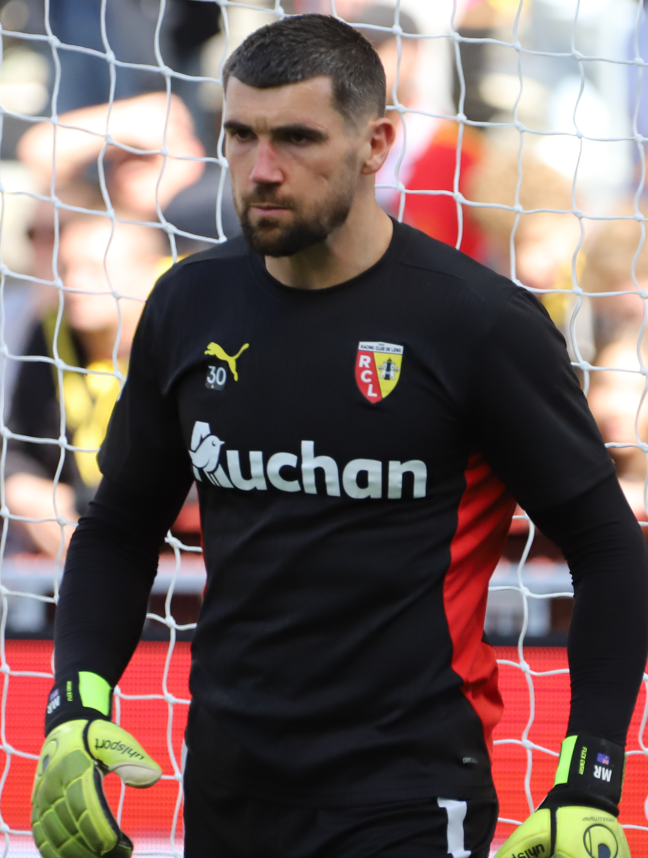
Ryan with Lens in 2025

On 21 January 2025, Ryan made a permanent move to Ligue 1 club RC Lens. He played a full 90 minutes for Lens the following week, keeping a clean sheet in a victory over Angers. Ryan left the club after not being offered a contract renewal at the end of the season.

=== Levante ===
On 26 August 2025, Ryan joined La Liga side Levante on a free transfer, signing a one-year contract with an option for an additional year. On 31 July 2026, he renewed his contract with the club.

== International career ==
=== Youth ===
Despite not having featured for the side previously, Ryan's strong form in the 2010–11 A-League led to suggestions he would be called up for the Australian under-20 team for the 2011 FIFA U-20 World Cup in mid-2011. However, he missed the tournament after suffering a serious knee injury.

Ryan was first called up for the Australian under-23 side in November 2011. He made his debut for the side in a scoreless draw with Iraq on 22 November 2011. The Olyroos failed to qualify for the 2012 Summer Olympics.

=== Senior ===
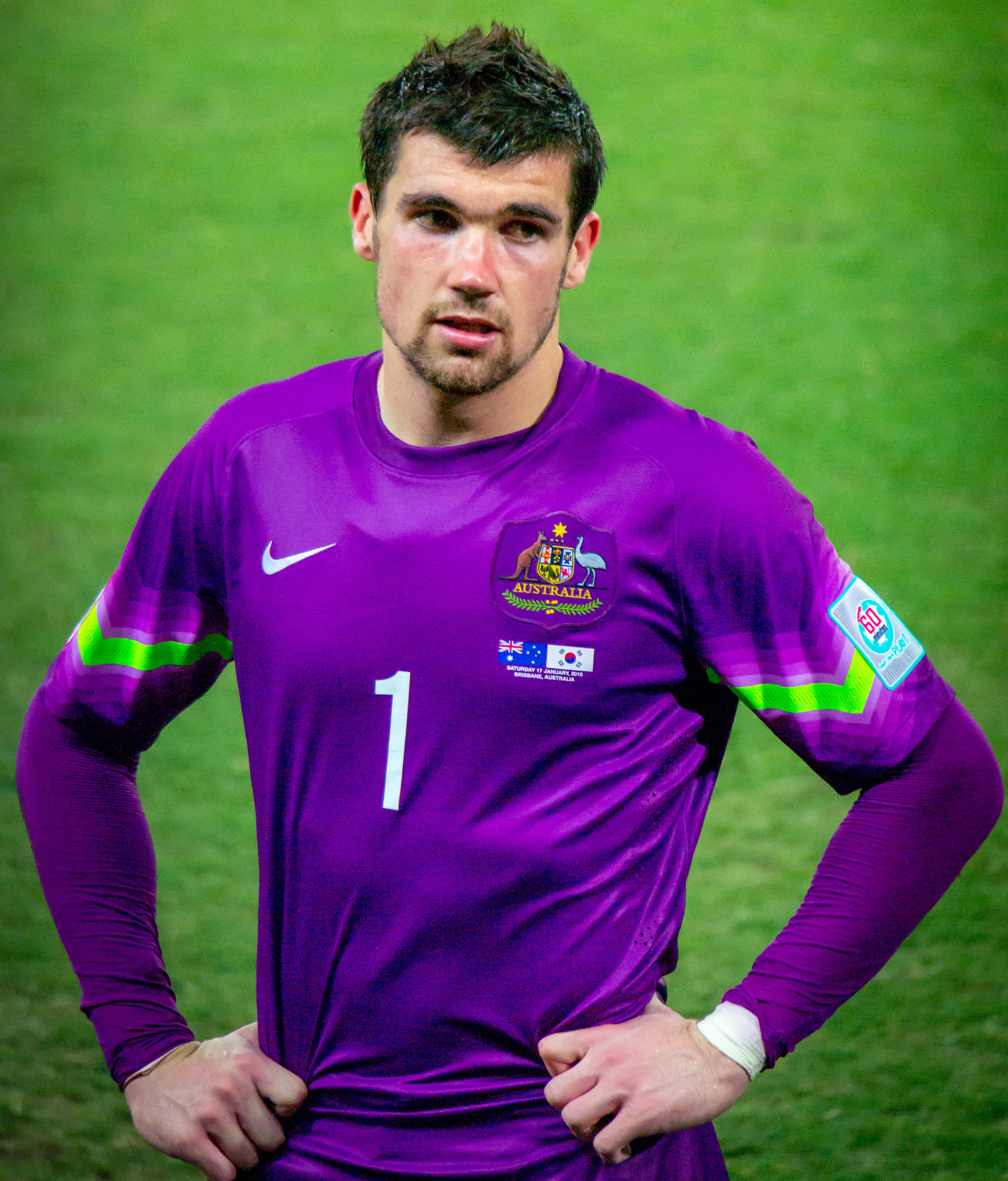
Ryan with Australia at the 2015 AFC Asian Cup

Ryan received his first call-up to the Socceroos squad for a 2014 FIFA World Cup qualification match against Saudi Arabia in February 2012. Later that year, he was selected in the squad for the second preliminary round of the 2013 EAFF East Asian Cup. He made his senior international debut in a 1–1 draw with North Korea on 5 December 2012.

In November 2013, longtime Australian goalkeeper Mark Schwarzer announced his international retirement following the appointment of new coach Ange Postecoglou, leaving Ryan as one of the contenders to be the new first-choice keeper. Postecoglou identified Ryan and fellow young keeper Mitch Langerak as two of the main candidates for the role.

In May 2014, Ryan was selected in the Australian squad for the 2014 FIFA World Cup. He played in all three of Australia's games as they were eliminated in the group stage after losses to the Netherlands, Chile and Spain. Ryan's own performances in the tournament were mixed, and he described the matches as a "massive learning curve" for himself.

Months later, Ryan was selected for the Australian 2015 AFC Asian Cup squad, to be played in Australia in early 2015. He put in a number of strong performances throughout the tournament as Australia conceded just two goals in reaching the Final against South Korea. Australia claimed their first AFC Asian Cup title after winning 2–1 in extra time. Ryan was named the official Best Goalkeeper for the tournament.

In May 2018 he was named in Australia's 23-man squad for the 2018 World Cup in Russia.

On 15 October 2019, Mathew Ryan captained Australia for the first time, becoming the 62nd player to captain Australia in a 7–1 win over Chinese Taipei. During this game Ryan also became Australia's second most capped goalkeeper with 58 caps, surpassing Zeljko Kalac.

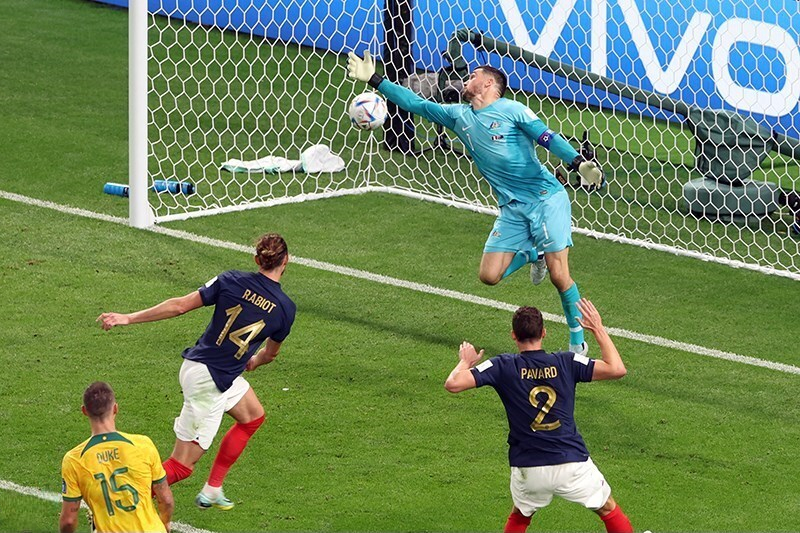
Ryan concedes a goal to France's Adrien Rabiot at the 2022 FIFA World Cup

Later, he was included in the final 26-man squad for Australia at the 2022 FIFA World Cup. He captained Australia in each of their four matches at the tournament and kept two clean sheets, a record for Australia at the World Cup. A mistake by Ryan allowed Julián Alvarez to kick Argentina's second goal in the round of 16, and Australia were unable to overcome the margin.

At the 2023 AFC Asian Cup in Qatar, Ryan conceded only one goal in Australia's three group stage games, coming against Odiljon Hamrobekov of Uzbekistan. A 4–0 win against Indonesia in the round of 16 meant Ryan's net was again left unpenetrated, but two late goals in the quarter-final to Premier League forwards Hwang Hee-chan and Son Heung-min knocked Australia out of the tournament.

Following the AFC Asian Cup, the Socceroos conceded valuable points to Bahrain and Indonesia, resulting in the departure of manager Graham Arnold. Arnold's replacement, Tony Popovic, began to use young goalkeeper Joe Gauci as his first preference over Ryan, leaving the Socceroos captain on the bench since Popovic's arrival in October 2024. Ryan was soon restored to the starting line-up and made a crucial penalty save in his 100th appearance for Australia to help ensure a 2–1 victory over Saudi Arabia and secure the country's spot at the 2026 FIFA World Cup.

On 31 May 2026, Ryan was selected in the 26-man squad for the tournament. He replaced Patrick Beach late in extra time ahead of the penalty shootout against Egypt during the Round of 32, which ended in a 4–2 defeat.

== Style of play ==
Described as a "ball-playing goalkeeper" by John Davidson of The Guardian, Ryan is known for his excellent distribution and for being comfortable with the ball at his feet, in addition to his shot-stopping abilities; his "sweeper-keeper" playing style was inspired by that of Manuel Neuer.

== Personal life ==
Ryan can speak both English and Spanish.

== Career statistics ==
=== Club ===
As of match played 12 October 2026

Appearances and goals by club, season and competition
Club	Season	League			National cup (Note: Includes Australia Cup, Belgian Cup, Copa del Rey, FA Cup, Danish Cup, KNVB Cup, Coppa Italia)		League cup		Continental		Total	
Club	Season	Division	Apps	Goals	Apps	Goals	Apps	Goals	Apps	Goals	Apps	Goals
Blacktown City	2009	NSW Premier League	0	0	0	0	—		—		0	0
Blacktown City	2010	NSW Premier League	11	0	4	0	—		—		15	0
Blacktown City	Total		11	0	4	0	—		—		15	0
Central Coast Mariners	2009–10	A-League	0	0	—		—		—		0	0
Central Coast Mariners	2010–11	A-League	31	0	—		—		—		31	0
Central Coast Mariners	2011–12	A-League	24	0	—		—		6 (Note: Appearances in AFC Champions League)	0	30	0
Central Coast Mariners	2012–13	A-League	25	0	—		—		8	0	33	0
Central Coast Mariners	Total		71	0	—		—		14	0	94	0
Club Brugge	2013–14	Belgian Pro League	40	0	2	0	—		2 (Note: Appearances in UEFA Europa League)	0	44	0
Club Brugge	2014–15	Belgian Pro League	37	0	5	0	—		16	0	58	0
Club Brugge	Total		77	0	7	0	—		18	0	102	0
Valencia	2015–16	La Liga	8	0	7	0	—		6 (Note: Two appearances in UEFA Champions League, four appearances in UEFA Europa League)	0	21	0
Valencia	2016–17	La Liga	2	0	0	0	—		—		2	0
Valencia	Total		10	0	7	0	—		6	0	23	0
Genk (loan)	2016–17	Belgian Pro League	17	0	1	0	—		6	0	24	0
Brighton & Hove Albion	2017–18	Premier League	38	0	0	0	0	0	—		38	0
Brighton & Hove Albion	2018–19	Premier League	34	0	2	0	0	0	—		36	0
Brighton & Hove Albion	2019–20	Premier League	38	0	0	0	0	0	—		38	0
Brighton & Hove Albion	2020–21	Premier League	11	0	0	0	0	0	—		11	0
Brighton & Hove Albion	Total		121	0	2	0	0	0	—		123	0
Arsenal (loan)	2020–21	Premier League	3	0	0	0	—		0	0	3	0
Real Sociedad	2021–22	La Liga	3	0	3	0	—		3	0	9	0
Copenhagen	2022–23	Danish Superliga	6	0	1	0	—		4 (Note: Appearances in UEFA Champions League)	0	11	0
AZ	2022–23	Eredivisie	18	0	1	0	—		6 (Note: Appearances in UEFA Europa Conference League)	0	25	0
AZ	2023–24	Eredivisie	29	0	1	0	—		9	0	39	0
AZ	Total		47	0	2	0	—		15	0	64	0
Roma	2024–25	Serie A	0	0	1	0	—		0	0	1	0
Lens	2024–25	Ligue 1	14	0	—		—		—		14	0
Levante	2025–26	La Liga	36	0	0	0	—		—		36	0
Levante	2026–27	La Liga	7	0	0	0	—		—		7	0
Levante	Total		43	0	0	0	0	0	—		43	0
Career total			432	0	28	0	0	0	66	0	526	0

=== International ===
As of match played 3 July 2026

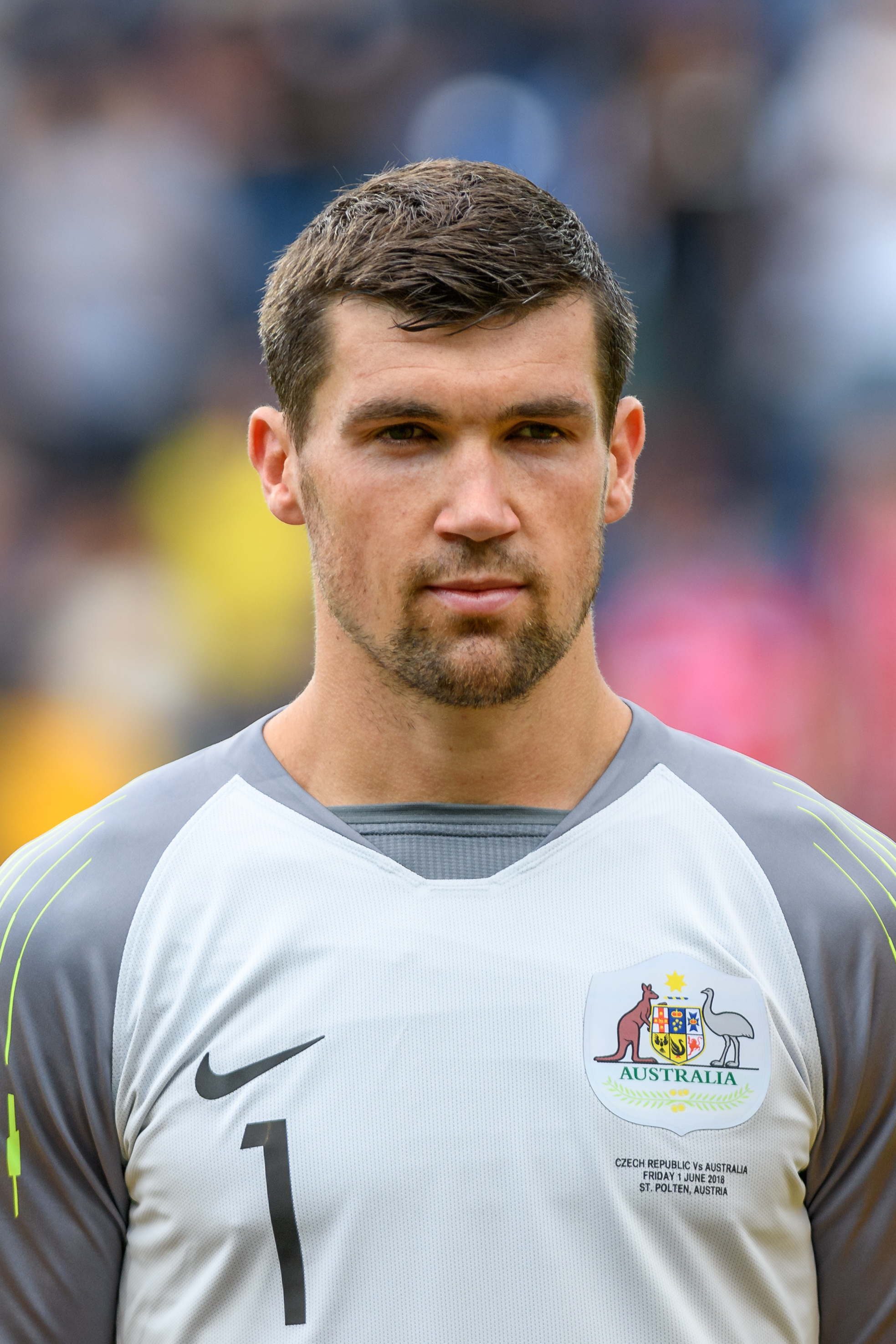
Ryan lining up for Australia in 2018

Appearances and goals by national team and year
National team	Year	Apps	Goals
Australia	2012	2	0
Australia	2013	2	0
Australia	2014	9	0
Australia	2015	8	0
Australia	2016	9	0
Australia	2017	11	0
Australia	2018	8	0
Australia	2019	9	0
Australia	2020	0	0
Australia	2021	8	0
Australia	2022	12	0
Australia	2023	7	0
Australia	2024	10	0
Australia	2025	6	0
Australia	2026	4	0
Total		105	0

== Honours ==
Central Coast Mariners

- A-League Premiership: 2011–12
- A-League Championship: 2013

Club Brugge

- Belgian Cup: 2014–15

Australia

- AFC Asian Cup: 2015

Individual

- PFA Footballer of the Year: 2014–15, 2018–19
- A-League Young Footballer of the Year: 2010–11, 2011–12
- A-League Goalkeeper of the Year: 2011–12
- Belgium Pro League Goalkeeper of the Year: 2013–14, 2014–15
- FFA U20 Male Player of the Year: 2011, 2012
- PFA Harry Kewell Medal: 2011–12, 2013–14, 2014–15
- PFA A-League Team of the Season: 2011–12
- Joe Marston Medal: 2011
- Mariners Medal: 2011–12
- AFC Asian Cup Golden Glove: 2015
- AFC Asian Cup Team of the Tournament: 2015, 2023
- IFFHS Asian Men's Team of the Year: 2020, 2021, 2023
- IFFHS AFC Men's Team of the Decade 2011–2020

== See also ==
- List of men's footballers with 100 or more international caps
