= Katrina Gorry =

Australian footballer (born 1992)

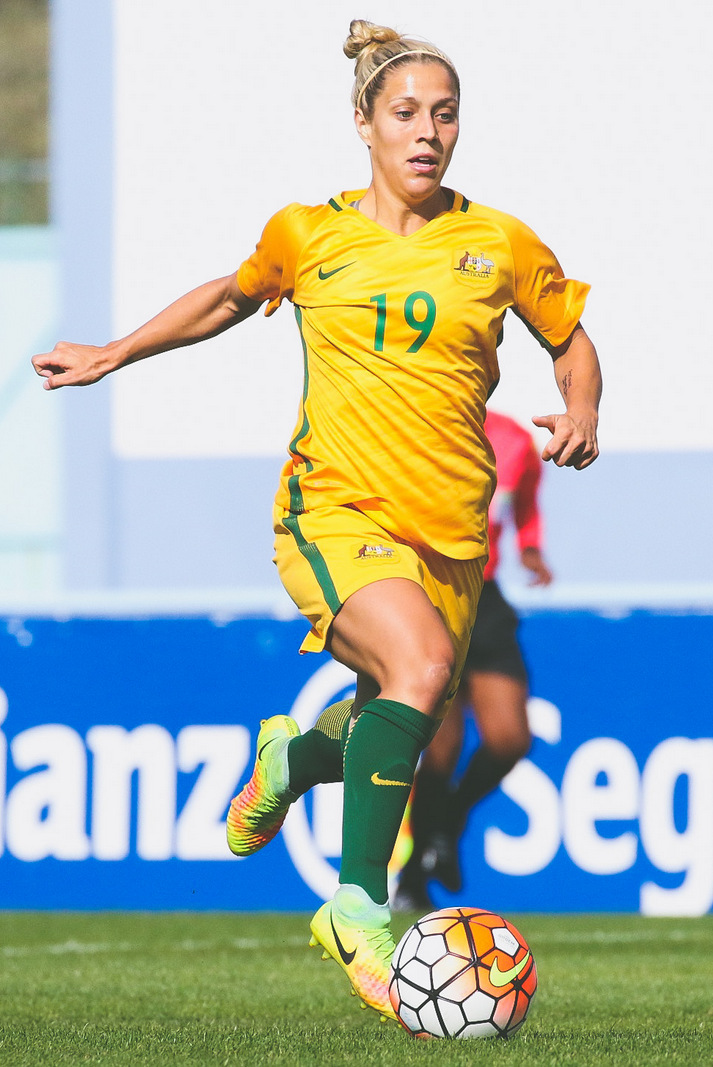
- Gorry playing for Australia in 2017

Personal information
- Full name: Katrina-Lee Gorry
- Date of birth: 13 August 1992 (age 34)
- Place of birth: Brisbane, Queensland, Australia
- Height: 1.54 m (5 ft 1 in)
- Position: Midfielder

Youth career
- Mt Gravatt Hawks

Senior career*
Years	Team	Apps	(Gls)
2009–2010	Melbourne Victory	9	(2)
2010–2011	Adelaide United	9	(1)
2011–2012	Melbourne Victory	9	(3)
2012	Ottawa Fury	12	(2)
2012–2020	Brisbane Roar	88	(18)
2014	FC Kansas City	10	(1)
2017	Vegalta Sendai	13	(0)
2018	Utah Royals FC	16	(0)
2020	Avaldsnes	13	(3)
2020–2022	→ Brisbane Roar (loan)	18	(5)
2022–2023	Vittsjö GIK	43	(7)
2022–2023	→ Brisbane Roar (loan)	10	(3)
2024–2026	West Ham United	47	(3)

International career^{‡}
2012–	Australia	123	(18)
- * Club domestic league appearances and goals as of 11:44, 27 May 2026 (UTC) ‡ National team caps and goals as of 2 May 2026

Katrina-Lee Gorry (/ˈɡɒri/ goh-REE; born 13 August 1992), also known by her nickname Mini, is an Australian professional soccer player who plays as a midfielder for the Australia national team. Gorry was the 2014 Asia's Footballer of the Year. In October 2023, she was nominated for "Hässleholmer of the Year" in the Swedish municipality of Hässleholm where she lived and played, following her World Cup performance.

== Club career ==
Gorry played youth football for Mount Gravatt. From 2009 to 2012, she played one season each for the Australian first division clubs Melbourne Victory, Adelaide United, and again Melbourne Victory. In the summer of 2012, she moved to Canadian W League participant Ottawa Fury, with whom she secured the championship.

Gorry joined the Brisbane Roar ahead of the 2012–13 W-League Season. In October 2017, Gorry become the first member of the Roar to sign a multi-year contract, as she signed a two-year deal to remain in Brisbane.

In March 2014, it was announced the Gorry was joining FC Kansas City in the NWSL. She made 10 appearances for the team as they won the 2014 NWSL Championship.

In 2017, Gorry spent a season with Vegalta Sendai in Japan.

On 14 February 2018, she joined the Utah Royals FC, marking her return to the NWSL. She made 16 appearances for Utah in 2018. After the season, Utah declined her contract option and she was waived by the club.

On 29 January 2020, Gorry signed with Avaldsnes in the Toppserien for the 2020 season. She played her first game for Avaldsnes on 18 July 2020, playing the full 90 minutes in a 1–0 win over Arna-Bjørnar. Her first appearance for the side earned her a spot in the Toppserien team of the week.

In December 2020, Brisbane Roar announced that Gorry would return to the club for the 2020–21 W-League season on loan from Avaldsnes. On 12 November 2023, Gorry announced she would be leaving the club.

On 5 January 2024, Gorry joined Super League club West Ham United. She made her debut for the club on 14 January in the FA Cup match against Chelsea, playing for 75 minutes as a starter. Ahead of the 2024–25 season, Gorry was named club captain. On 11 May 2025, Gorry was named the 2024-25 season Player Champion of Change as part of the inaugural Women’s Professional Game Awards.

== International career ==
Gorry made her debut for Australia on 11 July 2012 as a substitute against Japan. In May 2014, Australia played in the 2014 AFC Women's Asian Cup. She played in all five games, scored three goals, and reached the final against Japan, where Japan won 1–0. Gorry won AFC Women's Player of the Year and FFA Women's Player of the Year in 2014.

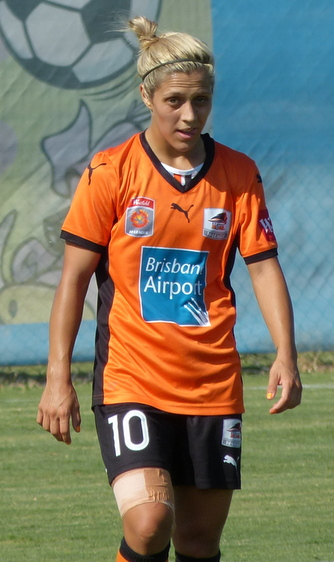
Gorry with Brisbane Roar in 2014

In May 2015, Gorry was named to the Australia's 23-player roster for the 2015 FIFA World Cup. She appeared in four out of Australia's five matches. The Matildas finished second in their group and advanced to the knockout stage. They defeated Brazil in the Round of 16 but lost to Japan in the quarter-finals.

Australia defeated Japan 3–1 in the qualifying for the Olympic Games. Gorry attended her first Olympics in 2016. She appeared in all four matches for Australia at Rio 2016. Their quarter-final match against Brazil was tied 0–0 after extra time and went to penalties. She was the fourth person to take a PK for Australia, she did not convert her penalty and Brazil went on to win the match 7–6 on penalties.

Gorry was part of the Matildas squad that won the 2017 Tournament of Nations and defeated the United States for the first time ever.

At the 2018 AFC Women's Asian Cup Gorry appeared in four matches. Australia advanced to the Championship Game by defeating Vietnam but lost to Japan 1–0 in the final. Australia qualified for the 2019 FIFA World Cup.

An injury at the end of the year prevented her from participating in the Cup of Nations in late February/early March 2019. She came back as a last-minute substitute in the 5–3 loss to the USA on 5 April 2019. She was nominated for the World Cup squad on 14 May 2019. She came on as a substitute in the 69th minute when the score was 1–1 against Italy and conceded a goal with her team in the fifth minute of added time to make it 2–1. She then featured in the final group game in the 4–1 win against Jamaica, where she provided the assist for one of Sam Kerr's four goals. In the round of 16, the penalty shootout was lost against former world champion Norway.

In the successfully completed qualification for the 2020 Olympics Games, she played in two of five games. After that, she was initially not nominated again because of her pregnancy. Since April 2022 she has been nominated regularly again.

In the 2023 FIFA World Cup, Gorry had the highest number of tackles of any player at 59, and covered the most ground of any player at 57.68 km. She played her 100th match for Australia in the semi-final against England.

On 4 June 2024, Gorry was named in the Matildas team which qualified for the Paris 2024 Olympics, her second Olympic games selection.

== Personal life ==
Gorry has had the nickname "Mini" since she was about 12 years old due to her short height. She is the shortest player representing Australia or playing for West Ham, male or female.

In 2025, Gorry admitted to having previously suffered from an eating disorder and depression. She said that her pregnancy and later motherhood helped her overcome this.

=== Family ===
Gorry gave birth to her first child in 2021. She is married to Swedish footballer Clara Markstedt; the couple began dating in May 2022. Markstedt gave birth to their first child together in 2024.

Gorry has a pet dog named Rio.

== Career statistics ==
=== Club ===
As of match played 16 May 2026

Appearances and goals by club, season and competition
Club	Season	League			National cup (Note: Includes Norwegian Cup, Women's FA Cup)		League cup (Note: Includes Nadeshiko League Cup, Women's League Cup)		Total	
Club	Season	Division	Apps	Goals	Apps	Goals	Apps	Goals	Apps	Goals
Melbourne Victory	2009–10	W-League	9	2	—		—		9	2
Adelaide United	2010–11	W-League	9	1	—		—		9	1
Melbourne Victory	2011–12	W-League	9	3	—		—		9	3
Ottawa Fury	2012	USL W League	12	2	—		—		12	2
Brisbane Roar	2012–13	W-League	11	2	—		—		11	2
Brisbane Roar	2013–14	W-League	14	5	—		—		14	5
Brisbane Roar	2014–15	W-League	12	2	—		—		12	2
Brisbane Roar	2015–16	W-League	10	2	—		—		10	2
Brisbane Roar	2016–17	W-League	12	5	—		—		12	5
Brisbane Roar	2017–18	W-League	13	2	—		—		13	2
Brisbane Roar	2018–19	W-League	5	0	—		—		5	0
Brisbane Roar	2019–20	W-League	11	0	—		—		11	0
Brisbane Roar			88	18	0	0	0	0	88	18
FC Kansas City	2014	NWSL	10	1	—		—		10	1
Vegalta Sendai	2017	Nadeshiko League	13	0	0	0	7	0	20	0
Utah Royals	2018	NWSL	16	0	—		—		16	0
Avaldsnes	2020	Toppserien	13	3	1	0	—		14	3
Brisbane Roar (loan)	2020–21	A-League	4	1	—		—		4	1
Brisbane Roar (loan)	2021–22	A-League	14	4	—		—		14	4
Brisbane Roar (loan)	Total		18	5	0	0	0	0	18	5
Vittsjö GIK	2022	Damallsvenskan	23	3	0	0	—		23	3
Vittsjö GIK	2023	Damallsvenskan	19	4	0	0	—		19	4
Vittsjö GIK	Total		42	7	0	0	0	0	42	7
Brisbane Roar (loan)	2022–23	A-League	10	3	—		—		10	3
West Ham United	2023–24	Women's Super League	7	0	1	0	0	0	8	0
West Ham United	2024–25	Women's Super League	22	3	0	0	2	0	24	3
West Ham United	2025–26	Women's Super League	18	0	1	0	0	0	19	0
West Ham United	Total		47	3	2	0	2	0	51	3
Career total			296	48	3	0	9	0	308	48

=== International ===
As of match played 21 March 2026

Appearances and goals by national team and year
National team	Year	Apps	Goals
Australia	2012	3	0
Australia	2013	7	3
Australia	2014	11	5
Australia	2015	16	3
Australia	2016	11	2
Australia	2017	10	1
Australia	2018	13	0
Australia	2019	4	0
Australia	2020	2	1
Australia	2021	0	0
Australia	2022	10	1
Australia	2023	15	1
Australia	2024	10	0
Australia	2025	6	1
Australia	2026	5	0
Total		123	18

Scores and results list Australia's goal tally first, score column indicates score after each Gorry goal.

List of international goals scored by Katrina Gorry
No.	Date	Venue	Opponent	Score	Result	Competition
1	29 June 2013	TATA Steel Stadion, Velsen, Netherlands	Netherlands	1–1	1–3	Friendly
2	6 July 2013	Stade Jean-Bouin, Angers, France	France	2–0	2–0	Friendly
3	24 November 2013	WIN Stadium, Wollongong, Australia	China	1–0	2–0	Friendly
4	5 March 2014	GSZ Stadium, Larnaca, Cyprus	Netherlands	1–2	2–2	2014 Cyprus Cup
5	12 March 2014	Paralimni Stadium, Paralimni, Cyprus	Italy	4–0	5–2	2014 Cyprus Cup
6	16 May 2014	Thống Nhất Stadium, Ho Chi Minh City, Vietnam	Jordan	3–0	3–1	2014 AFC Women's Asian Cup
7	18 May 2014	Thống Nhất Stadium, Ho Chi Minh City, Vietnam	Vietnam	2–0	2–0	2014 AFC Women's Asian Cup
8	22 May 2014	Thống Nhất Stadium, Ho Chi Minh City, Vietnam	South Korea	1–0	2–1	2014 AFC Women's Asian Cup
9	11 March 2015	Paralimni Stadium, Paralimni, Cyprus	Czech Republic	1–1	6–2	2015 Cyprus Cup
10	7 April 2015	Stadion Villach Lind, Villach, Austria	Austria	1–2	1–2	Friendly
11	21 May 2015	Jubilee Oval, Sydney	Vietnam	1–0	11–0	Friendly
12	29 February 2016	Kincho Stadium, Osaka, Japan	Japan	3–1	3–1	2016 Olympics Qualifying Tournament
13	7 March 2016	Nagai Stadium, Osaka, Japan	North Korea	2–1	2–1	2016 Olympics Qualifying Tournament
14	4 August 2017	StubHub Center, Carson, United States	Brazil	4–1	6–1	2017 Tournament of Nations
15	7 February 2020	Campbelltown Sports Stadium, Sydney	Chinese Taipei	7–0	7–0	2020 Olympics Qualifying Tournament
16	11 October 2022	Viborg Stadion, Viborg, Denmark	Denmark	2–1	3–1	Friendly
17	22 February 2023	Newcastle International Sports Centre, Newcastle, Australia	Jamaica	1–0	3–0	2023 Cup of Nations
18	28 November 2025	polytec Stadium, Gosford, Australia	New Zealand	5–0	5–0	Friendly

== Honours ==
Ottawa Fury

- USL W League: 2012

Brisbane Roar

- W-League Premiership: 2012–13, 2017–18

FC Kansas City

- NWSL Championship: 2014

Australia

- AFC Olympic Qualifying Tournament: 2016
- Tournament of Nations: 2017

Individual

- WPG Player Champion of Change: 2024–25
- AFC Women's Player of the Year: 2014
- FFA Female Footballer of the Year: 2014
- Lady Reds Supporters Player of the Year: 2010–11

== See also ==
- List of women's footballers with 100 or more international caps
