= Mark Schwarzer =

Australian soccer player (born 1972)

Mark Schwarzer OAM
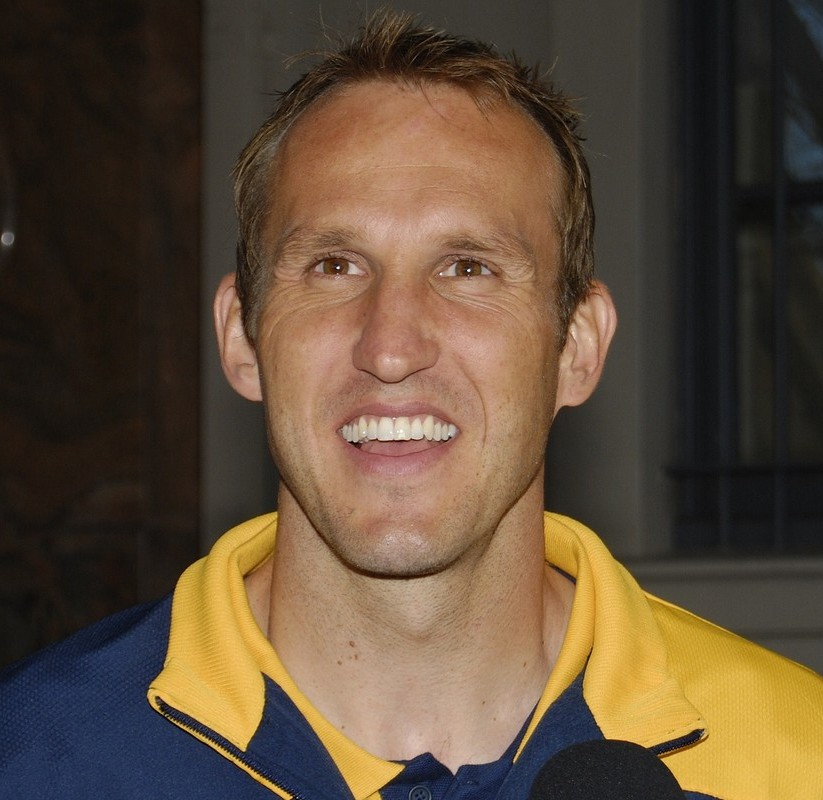
- Schwarzer in 2008

Personal information
- Full name: Mark Schwarzer
- Date of birth: 6 October 1972 (age 54)
- Place of birth: North Richmond, New South Wales, Australia
- Height: 1.94 m (6 ft 4 in)
- Position: Goalkeeper

Youth career
- Colo Cougars
- Penrith
- Blacktown Association
- Marconi Stallions

Senior career*
| Years | Team | Apps | (Gls) |
| 1990–1994 | Marconi Stallions | 58 | (0) |
| 1994–1995 | Dynamo Dresden | 2 | (0) |
| 1995–1996 | 1. FC Kaiserslautern | 4 | (0) |
| 1996–1997 | Bradford City | 13 | (0) |
| 1997–2008 | Middlesbrough | 366 | (0) |
| 2008–2013 | Fulham | 172 | (0) |
| 2013–2015 | Chelsea | 4 | (0) |
| 2015–2016 | Leicester City | 6 | (0) |
| Total | | 625 | (0) |

International career
| 1989 | Australia U17 | 6 | (0) |
| 1990–1991 | Australia U20 | 8 | (0) |
| 1993–2013 | Australia | 109 | (0) |
Medal record
Representing Australia
Men's association football
FIFA Confederations Cup
| Third place | 2001 South |
AFC Asian Cup
| Runner-up | 2011 |
OFC Nations Cup
| Winner | 2004 |
- * Club domestic league appearances and goals

Mark Schwarzer (/ˈʃwɔːrtsər/ SHWORT-sər, German: [ˈʃvaʁt͡sɐ]; born 6 October 1972) is an Australian former soccer goalkeeper. He represented Australia at international level from 1993 to 2013, and was selected for both the 2006 and 2010 FIFA World Cups.

Having progressed through the youth ranks of Colo Cougars, Penrith, Blacktown Association and Marconi Stallions, Schwarzer turned professional for National Soccer League side Marconi Stallions in 1990. After making 58 appearances for the club, he moved to German Bundesliga side Dynamo Dresden in 1994, appearing twice, and then to Bundesliga side 1. FC Kaiserslautern in 1995, appearing four times. Schwarzer joined then-second-tier side Bradford City in 1996 and made 16 appearances before joining Premier League club Middlesbrough in February 1997. He made 445 appearances for Middlesbrough, but decided to leave the club in May 2008. He then switched to Premier League side Fulham, and made 218 appearances for the club until he moved to Chelsea in 2013. He was the first – and, to date, only – non-Briton to have made more than 500 Premier League appearances (making him the highest-appearing non-Briton in the Premier League's history), and also the oldest player to have played in the knockout stages of the UEFA Champions League. He joined Leicester City on a free transfer in January 2015 and left the club at the end of their 2015–16 Premier League-winning season.

Having played for Australia at under-17 and under-20 level, Schwarzer made his full international debut in a World Cup qualifying match against Canada in 1993 as a substitute after Robert Zabica was sent off in the 17th minute. During the course of his international career, he won a total of 109 caps for his country. He became Australia's most capped male player when he surpassed Alex Tobin's appearance record in January 2011.

== Personal life ==
Schwarzer was born in North Richmond, a semi-rural suburb in north-western Sydney, and attended Richmond North Public School and Colo High School. He played for the local soccer club the Colo Cougars. His parents, Hans-Joachim and Doris, emigrated to Australia from Stuttgart, West Germany in 1968. He speaks fluent German.

In 2009, Schwarzer was awarded the Medal of the Order of Australia.

In June 2007, Schwarzer branched out from his football career and co-wrote "Megs and the Vootball Kids" with Neil Montagnana-Wallace. The short children's novel focused on the titular 'Megs', aka Edward Morison, during his move from his home country of England to Australia. While finding his feet, Megs befriends a quirky Hungarian cleaner who works at the primary school. The novel saw success and was followed by four sequels: "Megs, Scarves and Sombreros," "Megs and the Complete Left Foot," "Megs and the Crazy Legs," and "Megs and the Wonder Strike."

After rejecting offers from A-League clubs Sydney FC and Perth Glory in 2016, Schwarzer retired at age 43, joining Optus Sport as a panellist. Schwarzer was later involved in the network's coverage of UEFA Euro 2020, 2023 FIFA Women's World Cup and Euro 2024. In 2026, Schwarzer served as an expert commentator for FIFA's world feed during the 2026 FIFA World Cup.

Schwarzer's son, Julian, is also a retired goalkeeper. As Schwarzer's wife (Julian's mother) has Filipino nationality, the younger Schwarzer was eligible to play for the Philippines national football team.

== Club career ==
=== Early career ===
Schwarzer's first club was Colo Cougars in Richmond, New South Wales. He started his professional career at age 19 with Marconi Stallions in the National Soccer League. He left the Sydney-based club to play in Germany in 1994 with Dynamo Dresden and 1. FC Kaiserslautern. He then travelled to England to play for Bradford City in 1996, where he eventually joined Middlesbrough in February 1997.

=== Middlesbrough ===
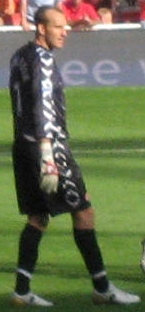
Schwarzer playing for Middlesbrough in September 2006

Schwarzer made his debut for Middlesbrough against Stockport County in the League Cup semi-finals on 26 February 1997. He featured in the final against Leicester City, which ended as a 1–1 draw, but was injured for the replay. He also played in the 1998 League Cup final against Chelsea, but was unable to prevent Middlesbrough from slipping to a 2–0 defeat. He was part of the side, however, who beat Bolton Wanderers 2–1 to win the final six years later, despite making an error described by BBC Sport as a "howler" which allowed Kevin Davies a consolation goal for Bolton.

In the last match of the 2004–05 season against Manchester City, he saved a Robbie Fowler penalty in stoppage time to preserve a 1–1 draw. The draw was sufficient to put Middlesbrough in seventh in the final league table and ensure qualification for the UEFA Cup; had Fowler converted the penalty, Manchester City would have qualified for the UEFA Cup at Middlesbrough's expense.

Schwarzer was granted a transfer request by Middlesbrough on 6 January 2006 and sought to join a new club, but he withdrew his request on 20 January 2006, and rejoined the team. A fractured cheekbone sustained against West Ham United, however, looked like it had ruled Schwarzer out for the rest of the season, but he returned for the UEFA Cup final against Sevilla, albeit playing with a protective mask. When he played in Middlesbrough's 1–0 victory over Portsmouth on 29 December 2007, he became the Premier League's longest-serving foreigner at one club, surpassing Dennis Bergkamp's record of 315 matches. Schwarzer's final Middlesbrough appearance came in an 8–1 victory over Manchester City on the final day of the 2007–08 Premier League season, after he had made 446 appearances in all competitions.

=== Fulham ===
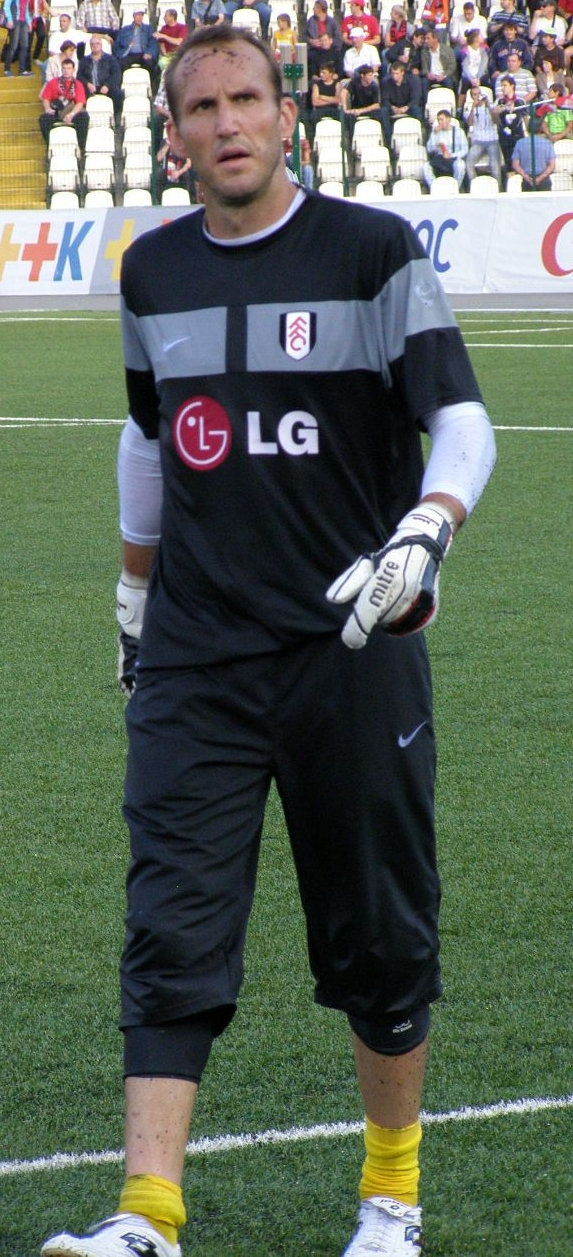
Schwarzer warming up for Fulham

Schwarzer's contract with Middlesbrough expired in June 2008, and although he was offered a new contract, manager Gareth Southgate had to plan a future with a new goalkeeper as, on 21 May 2008, Schwarzer signed a two-year contract at Fulham, ending an 11-year association with the Teesside club. Schwarzer revealed in an interview with The World Game that he had received offers from Bayern Munich and Juventus but declined their offers because they could not guarantee him the position as the number-one goalkeeper.

Schwarzer made his Fulham debut in a 2–1 defeat to newly promoted Premier League side Hull City, but he followed up by keeping a clean sheet in his next match in a 1–0 win at home to Arsenal and played every minute of the 2008–09 season. He kept ten clean sheets during the 2008–09 season in all competitions.

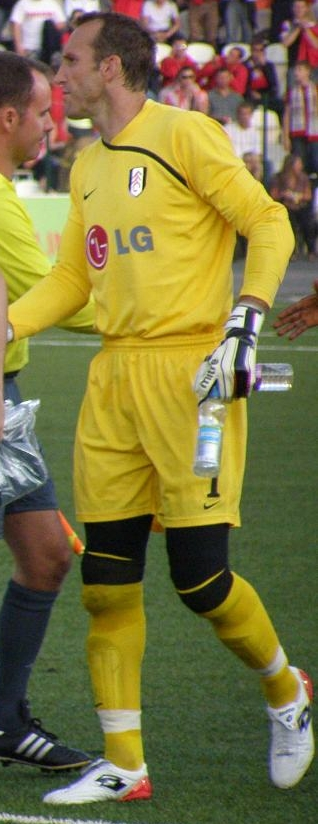
Schwarzer playing for Fulham in 2009

Schwarzer's contribution was important as his performances lead Fulham to a seventh-place finish and a place in Europe for the next season, after the club had only just avoided relegation during the 2007–08 season. He received the Fulham Player of the Year 2008–09 in his first year at the club. He was also named the Premier League's Player of the Month for February 2010, in which he only conceded one goal in his team's two wins and two draws that month, making him the first Australian to do so.

He played an important role in Fulham reaching the Europa League final in 2010, but Schwarzer lost his second European final with a narrow defeat to Atlético Madrid.

Following his performances during the 2009–10 season, Arsenal manager Arsène Wenger attempted to sign Schwarzer. It was reported that a bid of around £2 million in May 2010 had been made for Schwarzer and a second bid of around the same value had been made in August 2010; however both were rejected by Fulham.

On 13 August 2010, Fulham manager Mark Hughes revealed that Schwarzer had handed in a transfer request, which Hughes had rejected. On 31 August 2010, it was reported that Arsenal had made a last-ditch bid of around £4 million to bring Schwarzer to the Emirates Stadium before the transfer window closed, however Hughes denied that any approach was made.

Schwarzer signed a contract extension with Fulham on 18 January 2012, committing himself to the club until at least the summer of 2013.

Schwarzer made a notable injury-time penalty save against Mikel Arteta in November 2012 to help Fulham earn a 3–3 draw against Arsenal. In April 2013, he made his 500th Premier League appearance in a game against Arsenal, and became the first non-British or Irish player to do so in the process.

On 5 June 2013, Schwarzer announced he was leaving Fulham following the arrival of Maarten Stekelenburg. He said, "I've been hearing that for a while," he said of Stekelenburg's arrival. "It's no great surprise and I'll be looking for another club." Schwarzer was one of 12 players released by Fulham at the end of the 2012–13 Premier League season.

=== Chelsea ===
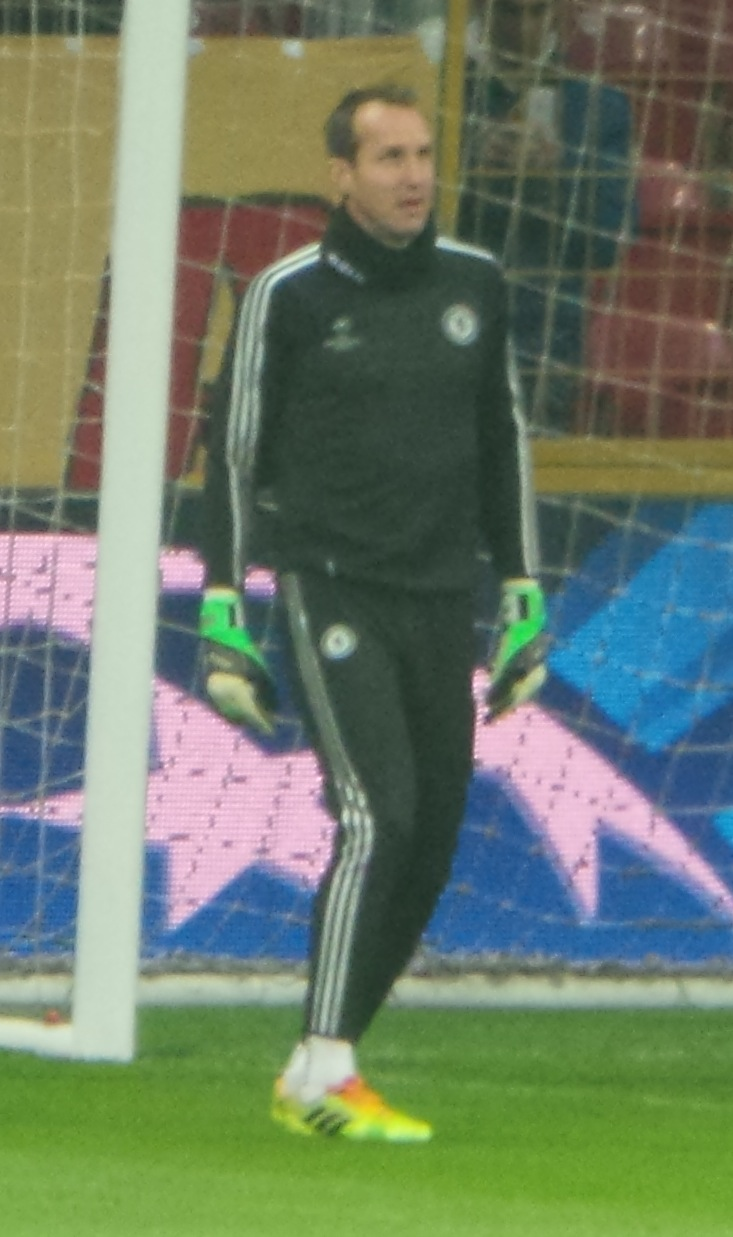
Schwarzer training for Chelsea in 2014

On 9 July 2013, Schwarzer signed a one-year contract with Fulham's West London rivals Chelsea on a free transfer. He has been quoted saying, "It's one of the biggest and best clubs in the world, and it's an honour to sign for Chelsea. I didn't take much convincing to come here." He made his competitive debut in a 2–0 away victory over Swindon Town in the League Cup. In Schwarzer's second appearance with Chelsea, he kept another clean sheet, as Chelsea eliminated Arsenal from the League Cup in a 2–0 victory on 29 October.

On 11 December, Schwarzer became the oldest player to debut in the UEFA Champions League aged 41 years and 65 days, when he kept his third clean sheet in three appearances for Chelsea, in a 1–0 home victory over Steaua București, a result that confirmed Chelsea's progression to the knockout round as first in their group.

Schwarzer became the oldest player to represent Chelsea in the Premier League when he played against Sunderland on 19 April 2014, aged 41 years and 195 days old. He became the club's oldest ever player by some margin, overtaking Graham Rix, who last played for Chelsea at the age of 37 years and 203 days. On 22 April, he replaced the injured Petr Čech in the first half of a Champions League semi-final against Atlético Madrid, and kept the score at 0–0. On 27 April, he started against Liverpool at Anfield, a crucial game for Chelsea to stay in the title race. He kept a clean sheet and made some outstanding saves to deny Liverpool from equalising, with Chelsea winning the game 2–0. His clean sheet against Liverpool was his 150th Premier League clean sheet, a feat only two other goalkeepers have achieved so far, those goalkeepers being Čech and David James.

Schwarzer was included on the list of players released by Chelsea at the end of the season, but he eventually signed a new one-year contract with the club, on 30 June 2014.

Although Schwarzer did not make any league appearances in the 2014–15 season before his move to Leicester City, Chelsea manager José Mourinho stated that he would receive a replica winner's medal for his contributions that season and was welcomed back for a celebration dinner at the end of the season.

=== Leicester City ===
On 6 January 2015, Schwarzer moved to Premier League side Leicester City on a free transfer as cover for the injured Kasper Schmeichel, after signing an 18-month deal. Chelsea manager José Mourinho praised Schwarzer's contribution to his former club, and stated that Chelsea would miss him. Schwarzer made his competitive debut for Leicester on 24 January in a 2–1 away win over Tottenham Hotspur in the fourth round of the season's FA Cup, becoming Leicester's oldest ever player in doing so. He made his Premier League debut for Leicester one week later in a 3–1 loss to Manchester United at Old Trafford. Schwarzer made eight appearances in his first season at the King Power Stadium, of which six were in their successful campaign to avoid relegation from the Premier League.

Schwarzer made no league appearances in the 2015–16 Premier League season, when Leicester became champions, making him ineligible for a winner's medal (minimum five league games required). In spite of this, he still became the first player since Eric Cantona to be in the championship winning squad at different clubs in successive seasons.

Schwarzer was released from Leicester after the end of 2015–16 season at the age of 43.

== International career ==
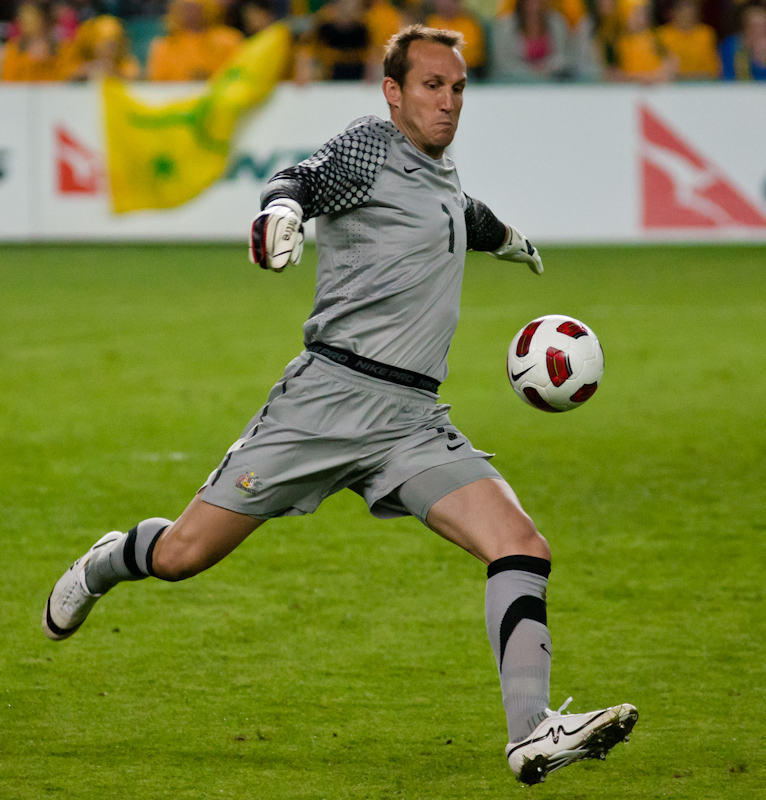
Schwarzer playing for Australia in 2010

Schwarzer made his international debut for Australia against Canada in Edmonton in a 1994 World Cup qualifier in 1993. He came on as a substitute for Milan Blagojevic after first-choice Robert Zabica was sent off 15 minutes into the match. In the return leg in Sydney, he made headlines when he saved two penalties to send Australia to the final phase of qualifying against Argentina. Schwarzer did not play in these matches, and Australia were defeated 2–1 on aggregate.

He was instrumental in Australia's qualification for the 2006 World Cup, in the play-off against Uruguay. After Uruguay won the first leg 1–0 in Montevideo, Australia won 1–0 in Sydney on 16 November 2005. In the penalty shoot-out, Schwarzer saved two penalties to see Australia victorious 4–2.

At the World Cup finals, he played the first two games in Australia's group matches, conceding a controversial goal against Japan, and two goals against Brazil. In the third match, he was replaced by Zeljko Kalac, but after Kalac's disappointing performance, he was reinstated for the round of 16 match against Italy. Although correctly predicting the direction of Francesco Totti's injury-time penalty, he was unable to save it.

Schwarzer played in all of Australia's matches at the 2007 AFC Asian Cup. Despite making two good saves in the opening match against Oman, which finished as a 1–1 draw, he made an error which led to a goal in the 3–1 loss to Iraq. In the quarter-final, he could not match Japanese goalkeeper Yoshikatsu Kawaguchi during the penalty shootout, which saw the Socceroos get knocked out of the competition in their debut at the tournament. Schwarzer said that the penalty shootout in the Asian Cup quarter-finals was the first penalty shoot-out in his career that he had ever lost.

Schwarzer saved an 89th-minute Shao Jiayi penalty against China in Australia's 0–0 draw in the 2010 World Cup qualifier in March 2008, continuing his record of stopping penalty kicks. He received his second yellow card of the campaign against Qatar in Doha, in which Australia were 3–1 winners, leading to his suspension for the following match against China.

Schwarzer made several vital saves to secure Australia's Asian Cup Qualifier 2–1 comeback win over Oman in Muscat after conceding from his penalty save rebound.

He was the country's first-choice keeper for all three matches of the group stage in the 2010 World Cup in a group composed of Australia, Germany, Ghana and Serbia. In the first match, Australia were crushed, 4–0, by the Germans, but they recovered with a 1–1 draw against Ghana in the next game. In the final match, Australia beat Serbia, 2–1, thus finishing third in the group with four points, just missing out on qualification to the round of 16 on goal difference with Ghana.

After the tournament, Schwarzer declared his interest in playing at the 2014 World Cup, at which time he would be 41 years old. On 5 November 2013, however, he announced his retirement from international level. Schwarzer's goalkeeping position was succeeded by Mitchell Langerak, and later with Mathew Ryan in Australia's soccer team.

== Career statistics ==
=== Club ===
Appearances and goals by club, season and competition
| Club | Season | League | | | National cup | | League cup | | Continental | | Total | |
| Club | Season | Division | Apps | Goals | Apps | Goals | Apps | Goals | Apps | Goals | Apps | Goals |
|---|---|---|---|---|---|---|---|---|---|---|---|---|
| Marconi Fairfield | 1990–91 | National Soccer League | 1 | 0 | — | | — | | — | | 1 | 0 |
| Marconi Fairfield | 1991–92 | National Soccer League | 9 | 0 | — | | — | | — | | 9 | 0 |
| Marconi Fairfield | 1992–93 | National Soccer League | 23 | 0 | — | | — | | — | | 23 | 0 |
| Marconi Fairfield | 1993–94 | National Soccer League | 25 | 0 | — | | — | | — | | 25 | 0 |
| Marconi Fairfield | Total | | 58 | 0 | — | | — | | — | | 58 | 0 |
| Dynamo Dresden | 1994–95 | Bundesliga | 2 | 0 | 0 | 0 | — | | — | | 2 | 0 |
| 1. FC Kaiserslautern | 1995–96 | Bundesliga | 4 | 0 | 0 | 0 | — | | 0 | 0 | 4 | 0 |
| Bradford City | 1996–97 | First Division | 13 | 0 | 3 | 0 | 0 | 0 | — | | 16 | 0 |
| Middlesbrough | 1996–97 | Premier League | 7 | 0 | 0 | 0 | 3 | 0 | — | | 10 | 0 |
| Middlesbrough | 1997–98 | First Division | 34 | 0 | 3 | 0 | 7 | 0 | — | | 44 | 0 |
| Middlesbrough | 1998–99 | Premier League | 34 | 0 | 1 | 0 | 0 | 0 | — | | 35 | 0 |
| Middlesbrough | 1999–2000 | Premier League | 37 | 0 | 1 | 0 | 5 | 0 | — | | 43 | 0 |
| Middlesbrough | 2000–01 | Premier League | 31 | 0 | 3 | 0 | 0 | 0 | — | | 34 | 0 |
| Middlesbrough | 2001–02 | Premier League | 21 | 0 | 3 | 0 | 1 | 0 | — | | 25 | 0 |
| Middlesbrough | 2002–03 | Premier League | 38 | 0 | 1 | 0 | 0 | 0 | — | | 39 | 0 |
| Middlesbrough | 2003–04 | Premier League | 36 | 0 | 1 | 0 | 7 | 0 | — | | 44 | 0 |
| Middlesbrough | 2004–05 | Premier League | 31 | 0 | 2 | 0 | 0 | 0 | 10 | 0 | 43 | 0 |
| Middlesbrough | 2005–06 | Premier League | 27 | 0 | 6 | 0 | 3 | 0 | 11 | 0 | 47 | 0 |
| Middlesbrough | 2006–07 | Premier League | 36 | 0 | 6 | 0 | 0 | 0 | — | | 42 | 0 |
| Middlesbrough | 2007–08 | Premier League | 34 | 0 | 5 | 0 | 0 | 0 | — | | 39 | 0 |
| Middlesbrough | Total | | 366 | 0 | 32 | 0 | 26 | 0 | 21 | 0 | 445 | 0 |
| Fulham | 2008–09 | Premier League | 38 | 0 | 5 | 0 | 1 | 0 | — | | 44 | 0 |
| Fulham | 2009–10 | Premier League | 37 | 0 | 5 | 0 | 0 | 0 | 18 | 0 | 60 | 0 |
| Fulham | 2010–11 | Premier League | 31 | 0 | 0 | 0 | 1 | 0 | — | | 32 | 0 |
| Fulham | 2011–12 | Premier League | 30 | 0 | 0 | 0 | 1 | 0 | 12 | 0 | 43 | 0 |
| Fulham | 2012–13 | Premier League | 36 | 0 | 2 | 0 | 1 | 0 | — | | 39 | 0 |
| Fulham | Total | | 172 | 0 | 12 | 0 | 4 | 0 | 30 | 0 | 218 | 0 |
| Chelsea | 2013–14 | Premier League | 4 | 0 | 2 | 0 | 3 | 0 | 3 | 0 | 12 | 0 |
| Chelsea | 2014–15 | Premier League | 0 | 0 | 0 | 0 | 0 | 0 | 0 | 0 | 0 | 0 |
| Chelsea | Total | | 4 | 0 | 2 | 0 | 3 | 0 | 3 | 0 | 12 | 0 |
| Leicester City | 2014–15 | Premier League | 6 | 0 | 2 | 0 | 0 | 0 | — | | 8 | 0 |
| Leicester City | 2015–16 | Premier League | 0 | 0 | 0 | 0 | 3 | 0 | — | | 3 | 0 |
| Leicester City | Total | | 6 | 0 | 2 | 0 | 3 | 0 | — | | 11 | 0 |
| Career total | | | 625 | 0 | 51 | 0 | 35 | 0 | 54 | 0 | 765 | 0 |

=== International ===
Appearances and goals by national team and year
| National team | Year | Apps | Goals |
|---|---|---|---|
| Australia | 1993 | 2 | 0 |
| Australia | 1994 | 2 | 0 |
| Australia | 1995 | 0 | 0 |
| Australia | 1996 | 1 | 0 |
| Australia | 1997 | 0 | 0 |
| Australia | 1998 | 0 | 0 |
| Australia | 1999 | 0 | 0 |
| Australia | 2000 | 4 | 0 |
| Australia | 2001 | 10 | 0 |
| Australia | 2002 | 0 | 0 |
| Australia | 2003 | 3 | 0 |
| Australia | 2004 | 6 | 0 |
| Australia | 2005 | 8 | 0 |
| Australia | 2006 | 8 | 0 |
| Australia | 2007 | 8 | 0 |
| Australia | 2008 | 11 | 0 |
| Australia | 2009 | 10 | 0 |
| Australia | 2010 | 9 | 0 |
| Australia | 2011 | 12 | 0 |
| Australia | 2012 | 9 | 0 |
| Australia | 2013 | 6 | 0 |
| Total | | 109 | 0 |

== Honours ==
Marconi Stallions

- National Soccer League: 1992–93

Middlesbrough

- Football League First Division runner-up: 1997–98
- Football League Cup: 2003–04; runner-up: 1996–97, 1997–98
- UEFA Cup runner-up: 2005–06

Fulham

- UEFA Europa League runner-up: 2009–10

Australia

- AFC Asian Cup runner-up: 2011
- FIFA Confederations Cup third place: 2001
- OFC Nations Cup: 2004

Individual

- FFA Australian Football Awards: Footballer of the Year: 2009, 2010
- Football Media Association Australia International Player of the Year: 2009
- Australian Professional Football Association Player of the Year: 2010
- Australia's Greatest Ever Team: 2012
- Premier League Player of the Month: February 2010
- Fulham Player of The Year: 2008–09
- Football Australia Hall of Fame: 2021
- Alex Tobin OAM Medal: 2014
- Order of Australia Medal: 2009
- 2025 Stadium Australia Hall of Fame inductee

== See also ==
- List of men's footballers with 100 or more international caps
