= Cambridge United F.C. Futsal =

- Full name: Cambridge United Football Club Futsal
- Founded: May 2015
- Ground: University of Cambridge Sports Centre, Cambridge
- Capacity: 400
- Directors: Jose Lima & Ruggero Ferretti
- Manager: Luís Mendonça
- League: FA National Futsal League - Division 2 Midlands
- 2015/2016: 1st - Promoted to SuperLeague
- Website: http://www.cambridge-united.co.uk/
Home colours	Away colours

Cambridge United F.C. Futsal is an English Futsal team based in Cambridge who compete in the FA Futsal League Division 2 (Midlands) since 2015. The team became part of Cambridge United F.C. in May 2015, after previously existing as Cambridge Futsal Club.

The team is composed of a senior squad and an U18s squad who compete in the National Championships in collaboration with Cambridge Regional College. They also offer 12- to 16-year-olds weekly Futsal sessions.

== History ==
=== 2013–2015 ===
Previously known as Cambridge Futsal Club, the club became the first Futsal organisation within Cambridgeshire, helping Cambridgeshire FA organising weekly Futsal sessions as well as running the FA Futsal Fives leagues. The club won every FA Futsal Fives League it participated except the last one in April 2015. This gave the club an entry pass to the FA Futsal cup in 2013/14 and 2014/15, with the club making it all the way to National Qualifiers in the latter year, playing against English champions Baku United.

=== 2015–2017 ===
The club merged under the Cambridge United F.C. after it was announced they would be running Futsal scholarships in conjunction with Cambridge Regional College, which would allow players to carry on playing the sport after finishing their education. Formed by Jose Lima, Ross Brooks and Ruggero Ferretti, The club then submitted their application to join the FA Futsal League and was accepted under Division 2, Midlands region.

Cambridge United F.C. Futsal won their FA National Futsal League - Division 2/Midlands league with 11 wins out of 12 games, thus gaining access to the promotional play-offs to the SuperLeague. On Sunday 1 May 2015 the U's defeated Derby FS 8–5 at home and gained access to the final, to be held two weeks later, at the Sportspark, by the University of East Anglia campus in Norwich. On 15 May Cambridge United F.C. Futsal secured promotion to the FA National Futsal Super League North, defeating 5–3 the University of York Futsal Club in the promotional play-off final. The final was played right before a friendly game between England and Finland. United also reached the semi-final of the Futsal FA Cup in what was a memorable first season for the club.

Having gained promotion to the FA National Futsal Super League North the U's finished in a creditable 4th position in the 2016–17 season and therefore won a place in the National play-offs against the winners of Super League South and favorites for the league Helvécia Futsal Club, having lost at home in the first leg Cambridge fought back to lead away from home, but ultimately Helvécia won the match and went on to win the title.

=== 2017–present ===
==== The FA National Super League ====
In 2017 Futsal in England underwent its biggest change when The Football Association announced a new National Futsal Super League was to be introduced for the 2017–18 season. Having finished in 4th spot in the Super League North the previous season Cambridge United F.C. Futsal won a place in the newly formed competition. Despite being favorites for relegation and starting poorly the U's went on a 9 match unbeaten run and finished in 3rd place.

== Honours ==
=== Domestic ===
- FA National Futsal League
  - Division 2 - Midlands: 1 (2015/2016)

== Present First Team Squad ==
Note: Flags indicate national team as defined under FIFA eligibility rules; some limited exceptions apply. Players may hold more than one non-FIFA nationality.

No.	Pos.	Nation	Player
—	GK	POR	Jose Lima
—	GK	ENG	Chay Jakes
—	GK	ENG	Tom James
—	GK	ESP	Lino Cebey
—	DF	UKR	Vitalii Burnus
—	DF	ESP	Justo Lopez Regaña
—	DF	ESP	Chema Cruz Bahamonde
—	DF	ENG	Harry Horton
—	MF	ESP	Angel Antelo Martínez
—	MF	ESP	Alberto Morcillo Martínez
—	MF	POR	Paulo Rodrigues
—	MF	ENG	Toby Hardwick
—	MF	ENG	George Harlow
—	MF	ENG	Greg Birch
—	MF	ENG	Johnny Tofts
—	MF	ENG	Tom Horton
—	MF	ENG	Tim Henery
—	MF	HUN	Zoltan Molnar-Saski
—	FW	ENG	Monty Bouttell
—	FW	ENG	Enrico Barnes
—	FW	ESP	Inaki Prado
—	FW	POR	Pedro Pereira
