= Sheffield Futsal Club =

- Full name: Sheffield Futsal Club
- Founded: 2005
- Dissolved: 2023
- Ground: English Institute of Sport, Sheffield
- Chairman: Mohammed Almaysari
- League: National Futsal League National Futsal Series
- Website: https://sheffieldfutsalclub.co.uk/

Sheffield Futsal Club was a futsal team based in Sheffield, England, that competed in the National Futsal League and National Futsal Series. The club was formed in 2005, originally named Sheffield Stormers until 2008 when they affiliated with Sheffield FC to become founding members in the FA National Futsal League. In July 2021, they broke away from Sheffield FC to become an independent club.

In 2023, the club dissolved.

Sheffield was one of the oldest and most successful futsal clubs in England, winning the FA National Futsal League North on three occasions. In 2011 they finished runners-up in the FA Futsal Grand Finals, losing out to London Helvécia Futsal Club.

Over the years they played their home games in many arenas throughout Sheffield, including Ponds Forge, Concord Sports Centre, Hillsborough Leisure Centre, and English Institute of Sport, Sheffield.

== History ==
=== Early years ===
Formed as Sheffield Stormers, founded by Mark England-Woodcock and Richard Moore. The club was set up to compete in the local futsal league held at the Sheffield United Academy in Shirecliffe, Sheffield.

=== Competing in the National Futsal League (2008-2009) ===
Becoming one of the founding members in 2008, Sheffield entered into the FA's new national league system, the FA National Futsal League after affiliating with Sheffield FC. They played their first ever national futsal league match on 2 March 2008, ending in a 5-2 victory over Sheffield & Hallamshire Futsal Club. Sheffield would be the only club to beat eventual league winners Tranmere Victoria, running out as impressive 10-2 winners with Liam Morris and Frazer Thomas each claiming a hat-trick. Thomas would go on to lead Sheffield's scoring charts with 15 goals throughout the course of the campaign, helping Sheffield to a third-place finish, 3 points behind second-placed Manchester Futsal Club.

The 2009 season saw the club finish in 5th. After notching 7 points from a possible 9 in their first 3 games of the season with wins against Manchester and Leeds, Sheffield went on to lose 4 games on the bounce. They would only win one more game that season, finishing with a heavy 19-3 defeat at the hands of Loughborough University. After the 2009 season had come to a close, Sheffield Futsal Club merged with Sheffield & Hallamshire Futsal Club, in a bid to create a team capable of qualifying for the UEFA Futsal Cup.

=== Champions of the north (2010) ===
Sheffield didn't get off to the best of starts for the 2010 campaign, although Frazer Thomas continued his scoring form, bagging a brace against Liverpool Futsal Club. But it wouldn't be enough as Sheffield would lose the first game of the season 4-2. The loss spurred Sheffield to go unbeaten for the rest of the season, picking up a number of impressive wins along the way, 4-2 against 2008 league winners Tranmere Victoria, and dominant performances away from home at Liverpool, Oldham Athletic, and FC Grimsby with 8-2, 11-1 and 8-1 respective scorelines. The penultimate game would see the visit of Manchester, this fixture would prove to be an important bout as both teams looked to win the title for the first time in their clubs history. Sheffield clinched a 6-1 victory, goals from Richard Moore and Frazer Thomas with Joel Rocha and Ben Mortlock each notching two goals. The triumph meant that they had all but claimed the league trophy going into the final game, with Sheffield 3 points and 9 goals ahead of Manchester. FC Grimsby traveled to Sheffield for the last game of the season, it was never in doubt with a convincing 17-2 win to claim the title in style.

The season would see Curtis Holmes, Ben Mortlock and Ollie Wheatley O'Neil represent the England futsal team.

=== 3rd Northern League title (2012-2013) ===
The 2012-2013 season would see a new coach at the helm after the departure of Junior Roberti, Spaniard Daniel Berdejo Del Fresno would take the reins as Sheffield were looking to regain their FA Futsal League North title that had been won by Manchester Futsal club in the previous season. The season would begin with a trip to teesside to play a strong Middlesbrough side however Sheffield would run out 7-5 winners. Further impressive wins would follow against Leeds and Derby before two big wins against Wakefield and Hull where Sheffield notched a combined 25 goals in the two games. Back to back victories against a resilient Liverpool side would see Sheffield top of the pile at the half way point of the season. Sheffield would start the new year with a resounding 14-1 victory over Wakefield, this was followed up with another win this time against Middlesbrough. A 14-0 victory over Derby would follow before Sheffield would face 2nd placed Manchester, the match did not disappoint a high quality match would finish 4-4. An impressive 10-2 victory over Hull FC would follow. The penultimate game of the northern league season would see Sheffield face off against rivals Manchester, victory for Sheffield would see them regain the Northern league title. Sheffield would win a tightly contested match 4-2 and with it claim the league title. The final game of the season would see Sheffield lose 5-3 against Leeds the defeat would be the clubs only defeat of the northern league season.

Sheffield would finish the season with a trip to Brussels for an international club friendly against Belgium professional side FP Asse Gooik. The match would finis 3-3 with FP Asse Gooik scoring two late goals to salvage a draw. It was a respectable result for Sheffield as FP Asse Gooik were a leading team in the Belgium pro league and had several international players in their side.

The season would also see Curtis Holmes remain an ever present in the England squad, with call ups to the England Development Squad for youngsters Jonathan Steel, Ryan Tate and Richard Ward.

=== 2013-2014 ===
The 2013-2014 would be a season of transition for the club some key players had moved on with promising youngsters coming into the squad. England captain Ben Mortlock would return to the club after a spell with London Helvecia. The season would start with hard fought wins over Liverpool and a much improved Derby side, a 3-3 draw would follow against early pace setters and rivals Manchester. A 5-2 victory over Wakefield would follow however a high scoring match against Middlesbrough would see Sheffield lose their first game of the season although Sheffield would bounce back in the next weeks with victories against Liverpool and Derby respectively. Sheffield would then put in their best performance of the season with a 10-3 victory against 3rd placed Middlesbrough a victory that would catapult them back into the title race. The penultimate game of the season would see Sheffield run out with a high scoring victory over Wakefield this victory set them up for a winner takes all title decider against Manchester in the final game of the season. Sheffield came into the match knowing victory would secure them a 4th FA Futsal League North championship in five years but it was not to be as Manchester ran out comfortable winner's and took the title away from their yorkshire rivals.

The 2013-2014 campaign would see Ben Mortlock be a regular for England as well as see Richard Ward and Ryan Tate be called up to train with the England Senior Squad. Toluwanimi Sotonye would also be called up for the England Development Squad.

== Season to season ==
Season	Division	Place	Notes
2008	FA National Futsal League North	3rd	—
2009	FA National Futsal League North	5th	—
2010	FA National Futsal League North	1st	FA Futsal Cup, 3rd place
2010/11	FA National Futsal League North	1st	—
2011/12	FA National Futsal League North	3rd	FA Futsal Grand Finals, runners up
2012/13	FA National Futsal League North	1st	FA Futsal Grand Finals, 3rd place
2013/14	FA National Futsal League North	2nd	—
2014/15	FA National Futsal League North	2nd	—
2015/16	FA National Futsal League, Super League North	3rd	—
2016/17	FA National Futsal League, Super League North	7th	Relegated from the Super League
2017/18	FA National Futsal League, Division One North	4th	—
2018/19	FA National Futsal League, Division One North	8th	—
2019/20	National Futsal League, Premiership North	6th	League decided on points per game due to Covid-19
2021/22	National Futsal League North	2nd	—

== Current squad ==
As of 4 February 2023

Note: Flags indicate national team as defined under FIFA eligibility rules. Players may hold more than one non-FIFA nationality.

Position	Name	Nationality
Goalkeeper	Elliot Di Napoli	(England)
Goalkeeper	Joe Smedley	(England)
Goalkeeper	Cosmin Cristea	(Romania)
Defender	Mark Chisholm	(Scotland)
Defender	Goncalo Andrade	(Portugal)
Defender	Adam Derradji	(England)
Winger	Fabinho	(Portugal)
Winger	Pedro Sevilha	(Portugal)
Winger	Lewis Stephenson	(England)
Winger	Denton Tyas	(England)
Winger	Henry Bowe	(England)
Winger	Danny Neath	(England)
Winger	Orlando Bidinotti	(Brazil)
Pivot	Ethan Crook	(England)
Pivot	Sergiu Didici	(Romania)
Pivot	Tyrone Gunter	(England)

== Notable former players ==
These players represented their country before, during, or after their time with the club.

Senior Squad

- (England) Curtis Holmes
- (England) Ben Mortlock
- (England) Richard Ward
- (England) Toluwanimi Sotonye
- (England) Ryon Leyshon
- (England) Ollie Wheatly-O'Neill

U23s/Development Squad

- (England) Samuel Mattocks
- (England) Ryan Tate
- (England) Jonathan Steel

== Managerial history ==
As of 8 September 2022

Former Head Coach, Adam Oldham

Dates	Name
2008-2009	Mark England-Woodcock & Richard Moore
2010	(Brazil) Janio Cruz
2010-2011	(Netherlands) Michel Liverani
2011	Mark England-Woodcock
2011-2012	(Brazil) Junior Roberti
2012-2014	(Spain) Daniel Berdejo-del-Fresno
2014-2015	Mark England-Woodcock
2015-2016	(Spain) Ernest Cardona Plantada
2016-2017	(Spain) Sergi Saldana
2017	(Italy) Giuseppe Brullo
2017-2018	(England) David Atkinson
2018–2020	(England) Adam Oldham
2020–2021	(England) Thomas Msadala
2021–2022	(Scotland) Jordan Wildey

== Honours ==
=== League ===
- FA National Futsal League North
  - Champions (3): 2010, 2010/11, 2012/13
  - Runners-up (3): 2013/14, 2014/15
