= Middlesbrough Futsal Club =

- Full name: Middlesbrough Futsal Club
- Nickname: Boro
- Founded: 2007
- Dissolved: 2016
- Chairman: Damon Shaw
- Manager: Damon Shaw
- League: FA Futsal League – North
Home colours	Away colours

Middlesbrough Futsal Club is an English futsal club based in Middlesbrough in the North East of England, which played in the FA Futsal League. The club was founded in 2007 and played their home matches in Thornaby-on-Tees: a town in the Borough of Stockton-on-Tees. The club dissolved in 2016.

== History ==
Middlesbrough Futsal Club was founded in 2007 after the success of the University of Teesside Futsal Club, to reach out to the community and to represent the town in the national league. Middlesbrough kicked off their existence winning the York Open and finished second in the Northern Futsal Premier League in 2007.

Middlesbrough Futsal Club now play in the FA Futsal League – the official national championship of indoor football (FUTSAL) in England – and the FA Futsal Cup. They play their home matches at Thornaby Pavilion.

They also compete regionally in the Tees Valley Futsal League and have travelled around Europe competing against some of the top professional teams.

== 2007 ==
Middlesbrough finished second in the Futsal Premier League Northern Conference. They played in the FA Futsal Cup finals in Sheffield, losing to eventual runners-up Vaughan's FC in the group stage, but failed to progress past the groups.

== 2008 ==
In 2008, Boro finished sixth in the first ever FA Futsal League North and retained the Tees Valley Futsal League. They also had two players, Ben Mortlock and Curtis Holmes, called up to the England national team. Curtis Holmes also represented Great Britain Universities in the World University Futsal Championship 2008 in Slovenia.

== 2009 ==
Middlesbrough had a rebuilding job to do after losing several important players from season 2008, but went on to record their best ever season.

Middlesbrough opened their season with a charity tournament featuring a Legends exhibition match. The Legends consisted of Curtis Fleming, Jim Platt and Craig Hignett, among other local celebrities. Middlesbrough also defeated Tranmere Victoria 5–2 in this preseason tournament to signal their intent for the season.

Middlesbrough stormed to the FA Futsal League North title, defeating Loughborough University, FA Futsal Cup finalists 7–3 to clinch the title and went through to the playoffs, where they drew 1–1 with Tranmere Victoria and 5–5 with Genesis, missing out on a shot at the title.

They went out of the group stage in The FA Futsal Cup, losing to London United and Team Bath before beating Worcestor 9–0. They reached the plate semi final, before being knocked out on penalties to Sheffield.

Ryon Leyshon broke into the England squad and became Middlesbrough's all-time top goalscorer.

== 2010 ==
Middlesbrough finished fourth in the FA Futsal League North failing to make the playoffs, Mikey Roberts, Jason Kilbride and Robbie Bettson all got selected for the Great Britain team for the World University Championships where they also finished 11th – the highest ever place they have finished. Robbie Bettson was top goalscorer in The FA Futsal League North with 20 goals.

== 2010–2011 ==
Middlesbrough finished 3rd in The FA Futsal League North.

== Club honours ==
- Tees Valley Futsal League: 5
  - 2006, 2007, 2008, 2009, 2010
- York Invitational: 1
  - 2007
  - 2009
- North Riding Futsal League: 1
  - 2009
- FA Futsal League North: 1
  - 2009
- FA Futsal Plate: 1
  - 2010

== First team squad 2011–2012 ==
Note: Flags indicate national team as defined under FIFA eligibility rules; some limited exceptions apply. Players may hold more than one non-FIFA nationality.

No.	Pos.	Nation	Player
1	GK	ENG	Eliot Brown
22	GK	ENG	Lewis Kirtley
3	Winger	ENG	Joshua Poyser
5	Winger	ENG	James Risbrough
6	Winger	SCO	Richie Dacombe
7	Winger	ENG	Sean O'Brien
8	Winger	ENG	Ryan Harker
9	Winger	ENG	Mikey Roberts
10	Winger	ENG	Robbie Bettson
11	Winger	ENG	Pete Bulmer
21	Winger	ENG	Theo Furness

== Notable players ==
There have been a few notable players who have played for Middlesbrough Futsal Club.

- Ben Mortlock England International
- Curtis Holmes England International
- Mathew Payne England Development Squad
- Ryon Leyshon England International
- Jason Kilbride England International
- (England) Ben Everson, English footballer
- (England) Matt Wootton Played professionally in Italy
- Ignacio de Leon Uruguay International
- Robbie Bettson England International
- (Portugal) Rui Filipe Fernandes Experienced Portuguese Goalkeeper

== Most goals ==
#	Name	Career	Goals
1	Ryon Leyshon	2007–2009	85
2	Jason Kilbride	2008–2011	77
3	Matt Wootton	2007–2009	60
4	Robbie Bettson	2009–present	50
5	Mikey Roberts	2009–present	47
6	Ben Mortlock	2007–2008	40
7	Ben Everson	2006–2007, 2009	34
8	Nick Hamblin	2006–2009	33
9	Immy Rashid	2005–2008	32
10	David Herbert	2007–2009	27
