= Futsal in England =

- Country: England
- Governing body: The Football Association via delivery partner England Futsal Limited
- National teams: Men's national team Women's national team

National competitions
- National Futsal Series National Futsal League

International competitions
- FIFA Futsal World Cup UEFA European Futsal Championships

Futsal is a growing sport in England.

Futsal in England is governed by The Football Association, via delivery partner England Futsal Limited.

The men's national futsal team was formed in 2003 and England were one of the last major sporting nations in Europe to have a national team. The team was inactive between 2020 and 2024, but returned in December 2024 to participate in the Main Qualifying Round of the UEFA European Futsal Championships.

The women's national futsal team was formed in 2024, playing their first fixtures in October 2024.

The National Futsal Series was established in 2019 and operates as Tiers 1 and 2 of the men's and women's national futsal pyramid.

The National Futsal League was established in February 2008, and was the first official national league in England. The National Futsal League now operates as the Men's Tier 3 competition.

Futsal has become increasingly popular in England among both adults and children, and among university students.

== History ==
The first futsal league in England was formed in 1990, the Pendle Futsal League based in Lancashire. Outside of Pendle, during the 1990s the first few futsal teams started to emerge in England, although there were very few teams and they had to travel to mainland Europe to take part in tournaments.

It was not until the 2000s when futsal began to take off in England. A Grimsby Futsal League was founded and later, in the summer of 2002 a tournament was played in Wirral.

In October 2002, the first international tournament in England was held in Chester, the British Isles Nations Futsal Cup. It was hosted by Tranmere Victoria, with four other teams representing Ireland, Scotland, Northern Ireland and Gibraltar. Shortly after the tournament Tranmere Victoria played a friendly match against Iran.

In November 2002, an English Futsal Championship tournament took place and was won by Pendle Santos. Two weeks later a pilot national tournament was organised by the Sheffield Hallamshire FA.

Ten teams took part and there was also a women's invitation match. Tranmere Victoria won the tournament and as a result were later chosen by the FA to be the first team to represent England in the UEFA Futsal Cup. Both the FA and FIFA had representatives at the tournament, there were also members of the British Universities Sport's Association present.

The future of futsal in England was discussed and the FIFA representative stated that they would support the FA in developing the refereeing and coaching programmes necessary for the development of the game in England. The possibility of establishing a national team was also discussed. In early 2003 it was revealed that the first official national cup was to be organised by the FA and would take place during the summer. Regional qualifying leagues were set up independently of the FA in Sheffield, Pendle, Wirral, London, Cheltenham and Grimsby, with the winners and runners-up qualifying for the FA Futsal Cup.

Prior to the tournament was the 2003 London Cup. The first FA Futsal Cup took place in July at the Army Physical Training Centre in Aldershot, with teams divided into two groups of six. An invitation was also extended to an Army team, as the Army Football Association. Sheffield Hallam won the cup and would enter as England's representatives in the 2004–05 UEFA Futsal Cup.

In 2003, an England select team travelled to their first world championships as a pilot for international competition. Up against some the best in the world, a team of semi-professional and university players took part in games against Iran, Uzbekistan and Indonesia.

In November 2003, the Futsal England Trophy was organised by Futsal England and sanctioned by the FA, in Cheltenham. The best futsal teams in England at the time were involved as well as teams from Spain, one team from Canada and one from Moldova. Sheffield Hallam won the tournament and became the first team to win both of the domestic titles at the same time.

In December 2003, the manager of the England Futsal team, Graeme Dell, put together an initial squad of 25 players selected to take part in a four-day training weekend in Lilleshall, in preparation for the qualifiers for the 2005 UEFA Futsal Championship. They then travelled to Portugal for further training and to play two games against Sporting CP and Sassoeiros. The preliminary selection was then cut down to a final squad of just twelve players who travelled to Albania for the qualifiers in January 2004. England lost both matches, losing 8-6 to Albania and 8-4 to Cyprus.

For the 2004 FA Futsal Cup, there were more qualifying leagues than the previous year, with the teams progressing from regional leagues in Bristol, Birmingham, London, Wirral, Derby, Pendle, Hull, Manchester, Gloucestershire, Sheffield, Grimsby, Oxford and Cumbria. This time the finals were held at the Sheffield Institute of Sport and 16 teams competed, split up into 4 groups in the first round. There was also a youth championship. Team USSR won the cup, beating Tranmere Victoria in the final. In July 2004, Jay Corran and Andrew Reading became England's first professional Futsal players when they signed for Romanian futsal club ACS Odorheiu Secuiesc from Tranmere Victoria. By 2005 regional tournaments were more common, some drawing teams from around the country, like the North East Futsal Open. In 2005, an invitational tournament was held at Lilleshall, the FA Training base in Shropshire. The five best teams in the country were invited to take part by then manager of the England Futsal team, Graeme Dell. The first unofficial national league took place in 2006, the Futsal Premier League. Although two years later in 2008, the FA Futsal League was formed.

== Grassroots ==
Futsal at a grass-roots level includes a number of local tournaments for universities, tournaments in local areas (such as the Grimsby tournament) or the York University PWC Open which features many different university teams competing against one another. As of 2010, there are many local leagues dotted around the country.

English teams are becoming more and more interested in travelling abroad to continue to learn Futsal. Teams travel to a variety of locations to participate in tournaments at a variety of levels. The four-day International Universities Totelos Tournament has involved numerous British universities. Participants have included York St John's College, the University of East Anglia, the University of York, the University of Glamorgan, and the University of Gloucester, as well as a few independent teams formerly associated with various universities. The University of East Anglia and the University of York have achieved top 10 finishes.

The British University Championship has been held each year since 2004, and the winners of the tournament now represent Great Britain in the World University Championships. Previously the squad was made up of students selected from different universities. In the squad that was selected for the 2004 tournament, only two players had previous experience playing Futsal, as the coach only had a short period of time to get a team together.

== National team ==
The England national futsal team was formed in 2003 and they play their home matches at St George's Park. England does not currently have an appointed manager. They play friendlies every year and take part in European Four Nations tournaments. England entered qualification for the UEFA Futsal Championship for the first time in January 2004 and took part in qualifying for the FIFA Futsal World Cup for the first time in 2008. England are yet to qualify for either tournament. England also played in the 'Kuala Lumpur World 5's tournament' in Malaysia in 2008, losing every game.

== The FA National Futsal Series ==
The FA National Futsal Series was established in 2019 with the aim of improving the quality of futsal in England. The inaugural season was unfortunately cut short due to the COVID-19 pandemic.

The National Futsal Series consists of six leagues, three men's and three women's.

The men's divisions are: Tier 1, Tier 2 North, and Tier 2 South.

The Women's divisions are: Women's Super Series (Tier 1), North (Tier 2) and South (Tier 2).

There is promotion and relegation between Tier 1 and Tier 2 divisions in both the men's and women's competitions. There is also promotion and relegation between the Men's Tier 2 divisions and National Futsal League (Tier 3).

== The National Futsal League ==
The National Futsal League began in 2008 and currently features 26 teams in 4 conferences; 8 in the Premiership North, 8 in the Premiership South, 5 in the Championship South and 5 in the Championship North with the winners and runners-up of the 3 conferences advancing to an end of season tournament to determine the champions.
