= Azerbaijanis in the United Kingdom =

Total population
- Azerbaijan-born residents 6,220 (2013 ONS estimate)

Regions with significant populations
- London

Languages
- British English, Azerbaijani

Religion
- Shia Islam, Secular

Related ethnic groups
- Azerbaijani American

Azerbaijanis in the United Kingdom or Azerbaijani Britons are a small Azerbaijani diaspora in the United Kingdom, including British citizens and permanent residents of ethnic Azerbaijani background.

== History ==
According to the Republic of Azerbaijan's state diaspora committee, Azerbaijani migration to Britain started in the late 19th century. The diaspora consists of Azerbaijanis from Azerbaijan, but also Iran, Turkey, Armenia, Georgia, Central Asia and Russia.

In 2014 Azerbaijani oligarchs were amongst the top investors in the London property market, having together with Russian, Ukrainian, Kazakhstani and Georgian oligarchs purchased over £2bn of luxury residential property in London in the previous two years.

In May 2014, Murad Gassanly became first British-Azerbaijani win elected office, becoming councillor at Westminster City Council, representing the Labour Party. In 2019, he joined the Conservative Party.

== Demographics ==
According to 2013 Office for National Statistics estimates based on the Labour Force Survey, there are around 6,220 Azerbaijani-born residents of the UK. Most British Azerbaijanis are concentrated in London.

== Culture ==
As of 2008, there is Azerbaijan House Culture and Friendship Centre functioning in London.

=== Arts and entertainment ===
A number of Azerbaijani art exhibitions have been held in the UK. Works by acclaimed Azerbaijani artists were displayed at an exhibition in London's Sotheby's art auction.

Numerous Azerbaijani musicians have been successful in British pop culture. In 2014, Elyar Fox became most successful British Azerbaijani in British Music as his song Do It All Over Again reached number 5th spot in UK Singles Chart. Sami Yusuf is another notable performer. Yusuf gained considerable recognition especially in the Islamic World following the release of his second album, My Ummah, in July 2005.

=== Celebrations ===
Significant Azerbaijani events or celebrations are celebrated by the community annually. The Nowruz is a celebration of the Persian New Year, celebrated by the Azerbaijani community every year.

The Republic Day of Azerbaijan on 28 May is also celebrated by local communities. British Azerbaijanis gather in multiple towns and cities every year on 26 February for the recognition of the Khojaly massacre. The largest of such gatherings occurs in the London area.

=== Cuisine ===
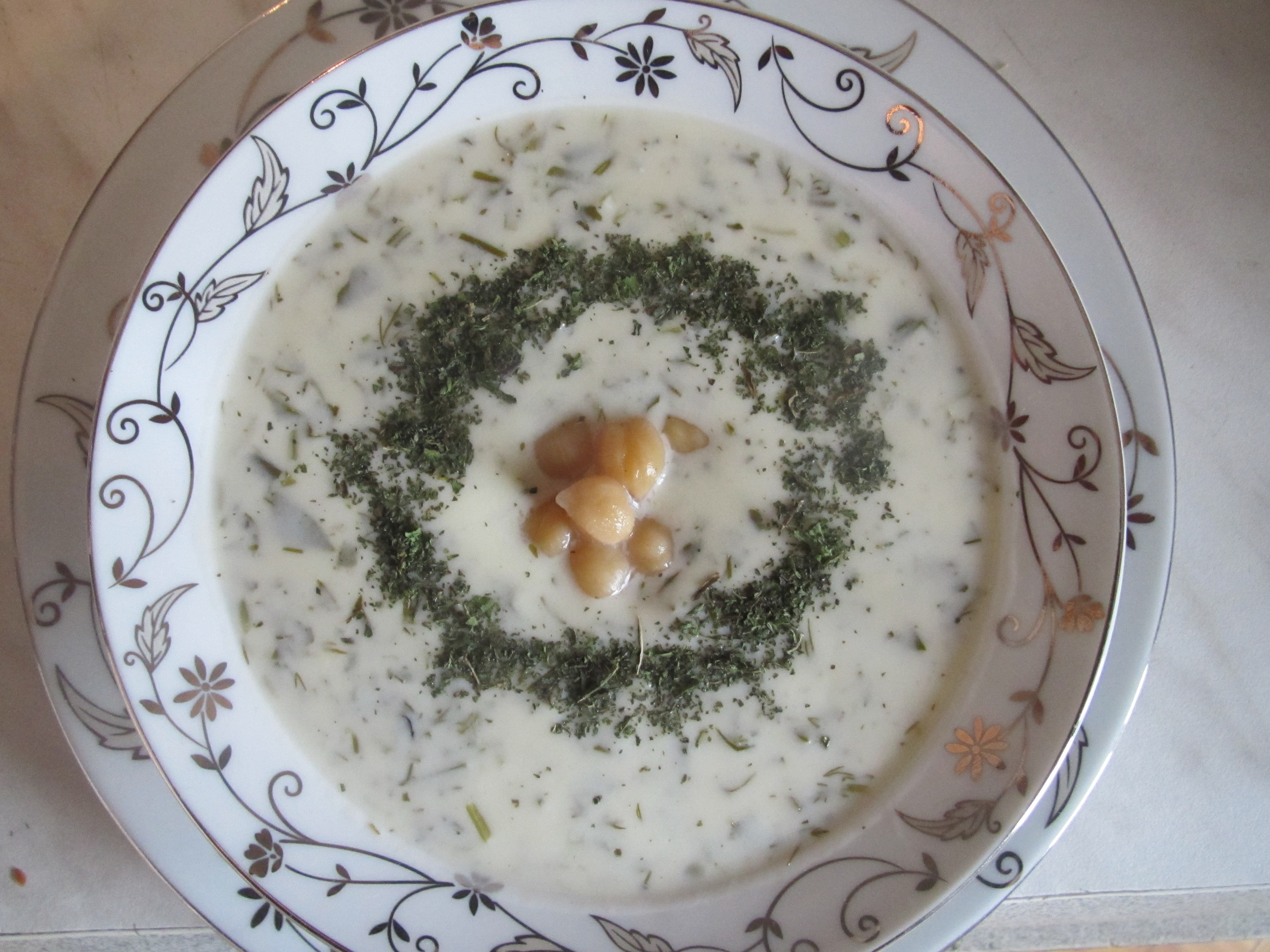
Dovga, a yoghurt soup cooked with a variety of herbs.

Azerbaijani cuisine is popular among British Azerbaijanis. A number of restaurants function in the London area and other locations with high concentration of British Azerbaijanis.

=== Religion ===
The vast majority of the Azerbaijani community are Shia Muslims, whilst the remaining people generally do not have any religious affiliation. Some British Azerbaijanis worship at the East London Mosque, the largest Islamic mosque in the UK.

=== Media ===
Daughter of President Ilham Aliyev, Leyla Aliyeva launched the Baku magazine in London in 2011.

=== Sports ===
Football is widely followed and played by many young British Azerbaijanis. As of 2008, Baku United futsal club founded by the Odlar Yurdu Organisation and currently participating in FA National Futsal League. The team celebrated their first title in 2013 by becoming league champions. It also become the first English club to play in the main round of UEFA Futsal Cup.

== See also ==
- Azerbaijan–United Kingdom relations
- Baku United FC
- Iranians in the United Kingdom
- Turks in the United Kingdom
