= Stewart Downing =

English footballer (born 1984)

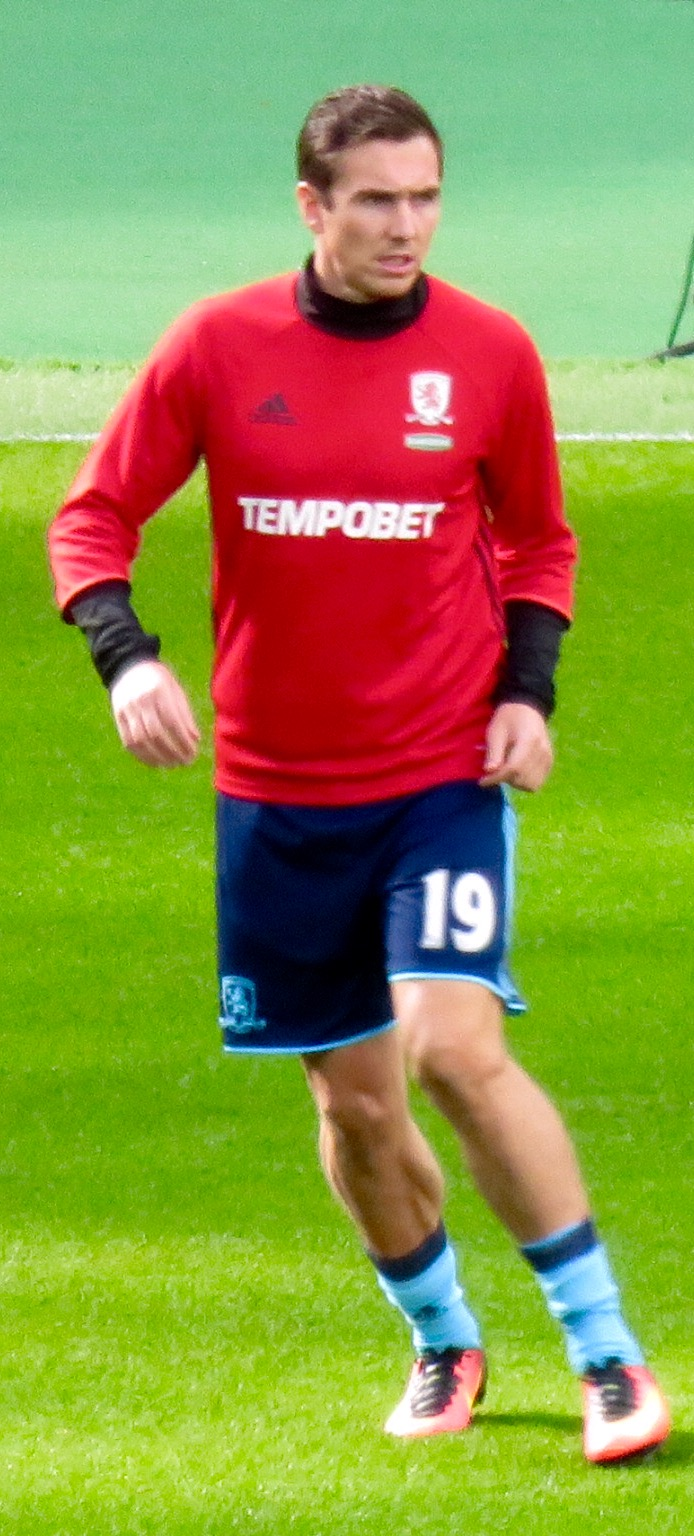
- Downing training with Middlesbrough in 2016

Personal information
- Full name: Stewart Downing
- Date of birth: 22 July 1984 (age 42)
- Place of birth: Middlesbrough, England
- Height: 5 ft 11 in (1.80 m)
- Positions: Left winger; left-back

Youth career
- –2001: Middlesbrough

Senior career*
Years	Team	Apps	(Gls)
2001–2009	Middlesbrough	181	(17)
2003	→ Sunderland (loan)	7	(3)
2009–2011	Aston Villa	63	(9)
2011–2013	Liverpool	65	(3)
2013–2015	West Ham United	69	(7)
2015–2019	Middlesbrough	153	(9)
2019–2021	Blackburn Rovers	59	(2)
Total		597	(50)

International career
2001	England U16	2	(0)
2002	England U18	3	(0)
2002–2003	England U19	7	(0)
2004–2005	England U21	8	(0)
2007	England B	1	(2)
2005–2014	England	35	(0)
- * Club domestic league appearances and goals

Stewart Downing (born 22 July 1984) is an English former professional footballer. He played most of his career as a winger or left-back. He is currently the assistant coach for Leeds United's U21 squad.

Downing started his career at Middlesbrough, where after a loan at Sunderland, he became a key part of the team, winning the League Cup in 2004 and helping them to the UEFA Cup final two years later. In 2009, after Boro's relegation, he joined Aston Villa for an initial £10 million, then moved on to Liverpool for twice that amount two years later, again winning the League Cup in 2012. He played for two seasons at West Ham United before returning to Middlesbrough, where he won promotion to the Premier League. In 2019, he was released by Middlesbrough after 404 total appearances, and signed for Blackburn Rovers, remaining there for two seasons before retiring in 2021.

A full international from 2005 to 2014, Downing earned 35 caps for England. He was included in the nation's squads that reached the quarter-finals at the 2006 FIFA World Cup and UEFA Euro 2012.

== Club career ==
=== Middlesbrough ===
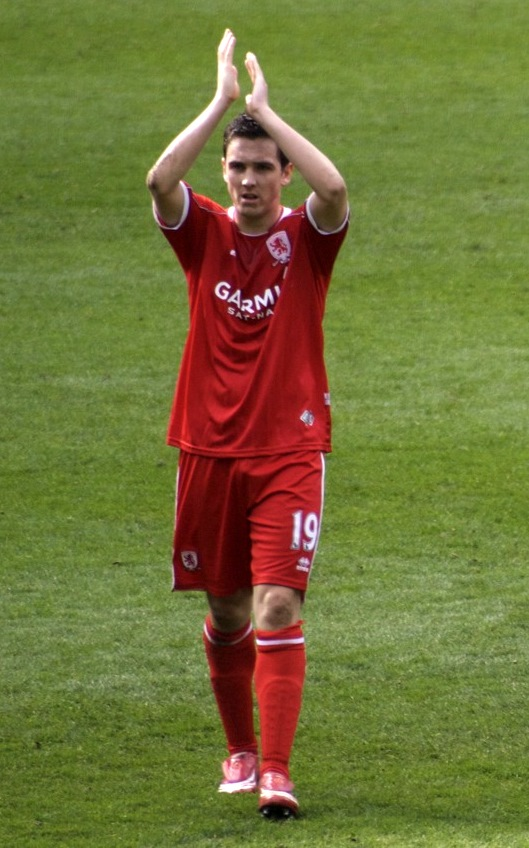
Downing playing for Middlesbrough in 2008

Downing was born in Middlesbrough, Teesside, and was a graduate of the Middlesbrough Academy.

Downing signed his first professional contract on 6 September 2001. His debut came on 24 April 2002 in a Premier League match away to Ipswich Town, playing the full 90 minutes of a 1–0 loss at Portman Road. He was limited to just three appearances during the 2001–02 season, plus a further three in the following 2002–03 season. His first senior goal came on 1 October 2002 in a 4–1 League Cup second round away victory over Brentford, coming on as a substitute to conclude the scoring at Griffin Park.

On 30 October 2003, Downing went on a one-month loan to Sunderland, of the First Division. He scored three goals in seven matches for Mick McCarthy's Black Cats team, starting on 4 November when he equalised in a 3–1 win at Gillingham, also assisting John Oster.

Having scored as many goals on his loan as Middlesbrough's top scorer Szilárd Németh had recorded all season, Downing was recalled from his loan on 11 December due to injury to Juninho. He was a regular for the remainder of the season, but was an unused substitute on 29 February 2004, when they won the 2004 League Cup Final against Bolton Wanderers.

The 2004–05 season saw Downing make 49 appearances, scoring six goals, as well as providing numerous assists. In a UEFA Cup match against Lazio in November 2004, both Downing and Zenden were in the starting line-up. Though Zenden scored both goals in the 2–0 victory, Downing drew praise for his performance down the left. Such performances that season saw him called up to Sven-Göran Eriksson's England squad in February 2005 for a friendly against the Netherlands.

A knee injury saw Downing sidelined for five months at the end of 2005, though he returned to play his part in the run to the 2006 UEFA Cup Final, including three assists in the 4–2 (4–3 agg) victory over Steaua București in the semi-final second leg. He started in the final as Middlesbrough were beaten 4–0 by Sevilla at the Philips Stadion.

On 26 February 2008, Downing signed a new five-year contract, keeping him signed on at Middlesbrough until summer 2013.

The 2008–09 season was a mixed one for Downing. Middlesbrough had their best start to the season in six years which saw them climb to 8th in the table, however, a winless run which started in November 2008 saw them fall into the relegation zone. On 5 January 2009, he handed in a written transfer request expressing his desire to leave the club but the request was turned down on the same day. In the penultimate match of the season, he sustained a foot injury after a challenge from Stiliyan Petrov in a home match against Aston Villa in May 2009, which needed an operation, ruling him out for at least four months. After spending the whole of the second half of the season in the relegation zone, Middlesbrough were relegated on the final day after they lost 2–1 away at West Ham United. Downing, having started every league match, except the last match, ended the season with no league goals, having only scored two against West Ham United in the FA Cup.

=== Aston Villa ===
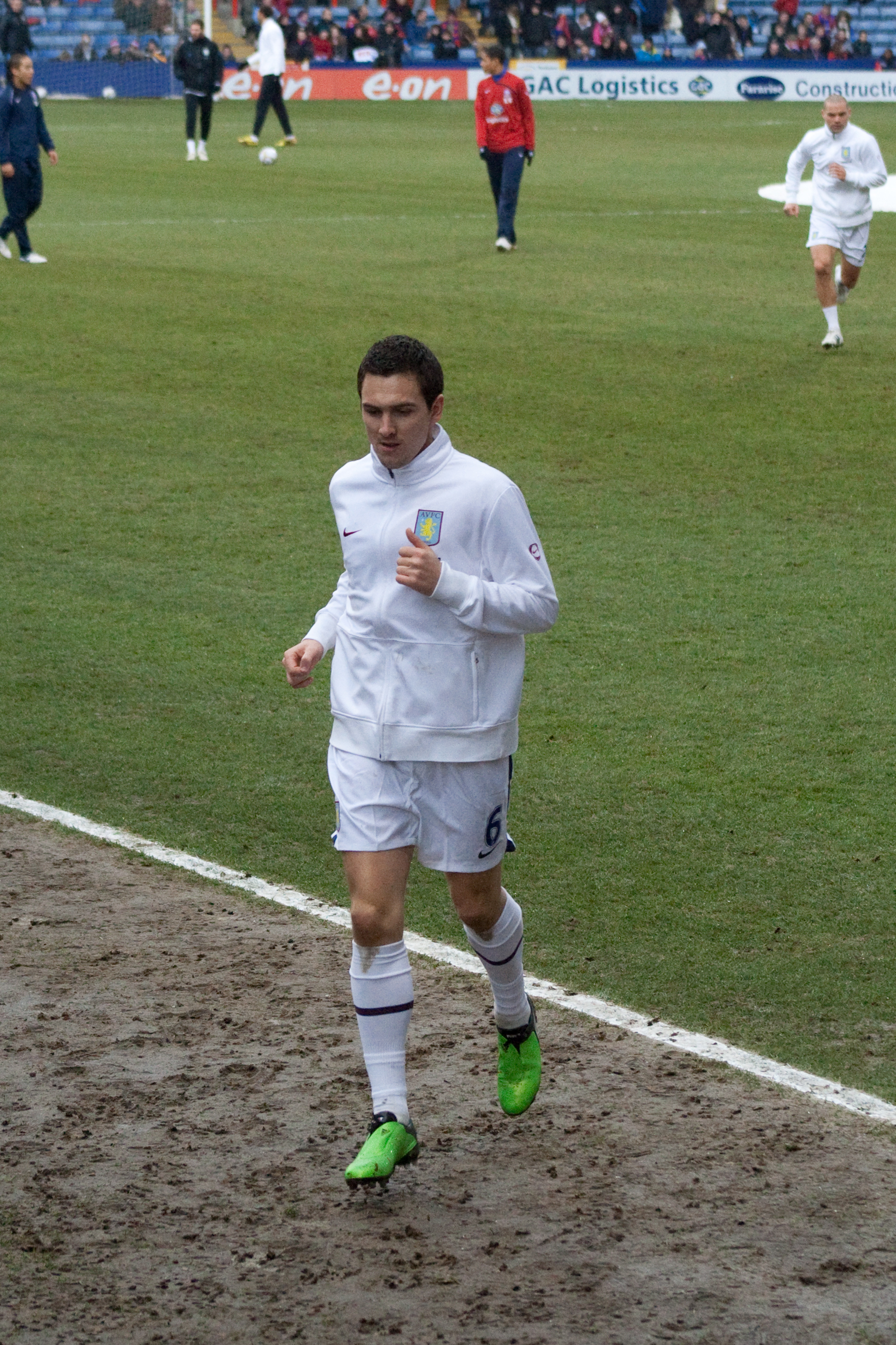
Downing playing for Aston Villa in 2010

Following Middlesbrough's relegation, Downing signed a four-year contract with Aston Villa, becoming Martin O'Neill's first signing of the 2009 Summer transfer window for a fee of £10 million with an extra £2 million to be paid depending on appearances. On 7 November 2009, O'Neill announced that Downing had returned to full training following his injury against Villa while playing for Middlesbrough during 2008–09. Downing made his Aston Villa debut on as a 69th-minute substitute for Steve Sidwell in the away match against Burnley. He scored his first goal for Villa in the League Cup fourth round tie against Portsmouth at Fratton Park on 1 December 2009.

Downing's return to action saw him returning to his preferred left wing role, with James Milner moving to central midfield for Villa. In December 2009, Downing played in Villa's first win against Manchester United at Old Trafford since 1983 in a 1–0 victory for Villa. Downing then went on to score his first and second league goal for Villa in their 5–2 win against Burnley on 2 February 2010. His second season with Aston Villa had been a much improved one, he scored the first Premier League goal of the season against West Ham United at Villa Park on 14 August in a 3–0 win.

In the final match of the season, Downing scored his eighth against Liverpool at Villa Park with the result ending 1–0; during the 2010–11 season, Downing made 44 appearances and scored eight goals in all competitions. Downing was the subject of speculation over the summer, with Liverpool showing interest in the winger. On 6 July, Liverpool tabled a bid of £15 million for Downing but this was rejected by Villa, who said they would not let Downing go for less than £20m. New Villa manager Alex McLeish then stated that Downing was not for sale and he would not be leaving Villa in the summer. However, on 13 July 2011, a fee was agreed between Aston Villa and Liverpool for the transfer of Downing.

=== Liverpool ===
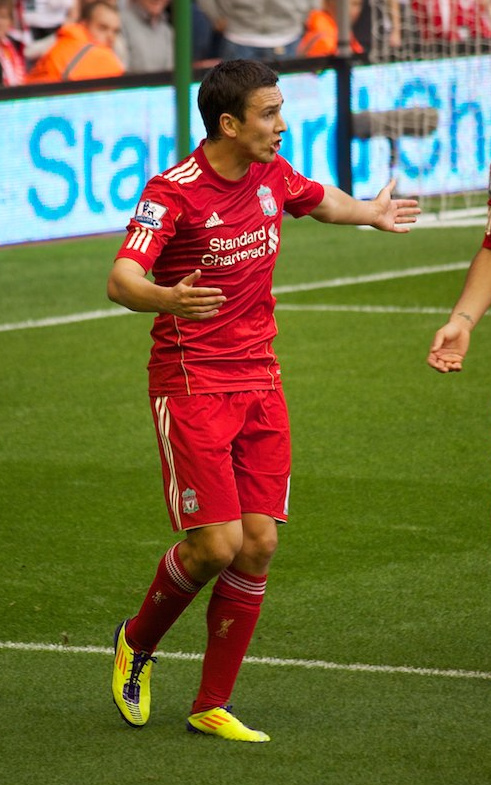
Downing playing for Liverpool in 2011

Downing completed his move to Liverpool on 15 July 2011, for an undisclosed fee, believed to be around £20 million. On 13 August 2011, Downing made his debut in Liverpool's first match of the 2011–12 Premier League, in a 1–1 draw against Sunderland at Anfield, playing the full 90 minutes. On 20 August 2011, he started and played the full 90 minutes against Arsenal in a 2–0 victory at the Emirates Stadium. On 6 January 2012, Downing scored his first goal for Liverpool against Oldham Athletic at Anfield in the third round of the FA Cup. On 26 February he won the League Cup with Liverpool, scoring his penalty in the shoot-out and winning the Alan Hardaker Trophy as Man of the Match. On 18 March 2012 he scored the winner in a 2–1 victory over Stoke City in the FA Cup quarter-final, securing a second Wembley visit for Liverpool in the semi-finals in what was described as "his most telling Liverpool contribution" so far.

Downing scored the winner in Liverpool's first match of 2012–13, a left foot shot in a UEFA Europa League match against Gomel. On 30 August 2012, Downing was deployed as a left back against Hearts. He scored the winning and only goal against Anzhi Makhachkala at Anfield in the Europa League. After the match, he was praised by manager Brendan Rodgers saying "It's been a tough time. He's had a rough ride but he's an important member of our team." On 22 December, he made his first league assist and scored his first league goal in a 4–0 win against Fulham. He scored his second league goal for the club on 2 March 2013, opening the scoring in a 4–0 win away to Wigan Athletic, with a header from a Philippe Coutinho cross. In Liverpool's next match, Downing scored the equaliser against Tottenham Hotspur, in a 3–2 home victory for Liverpool. This marked Downing's fifth goal in all competitions and his last goal for Liverpool.

=== West Ham United ===
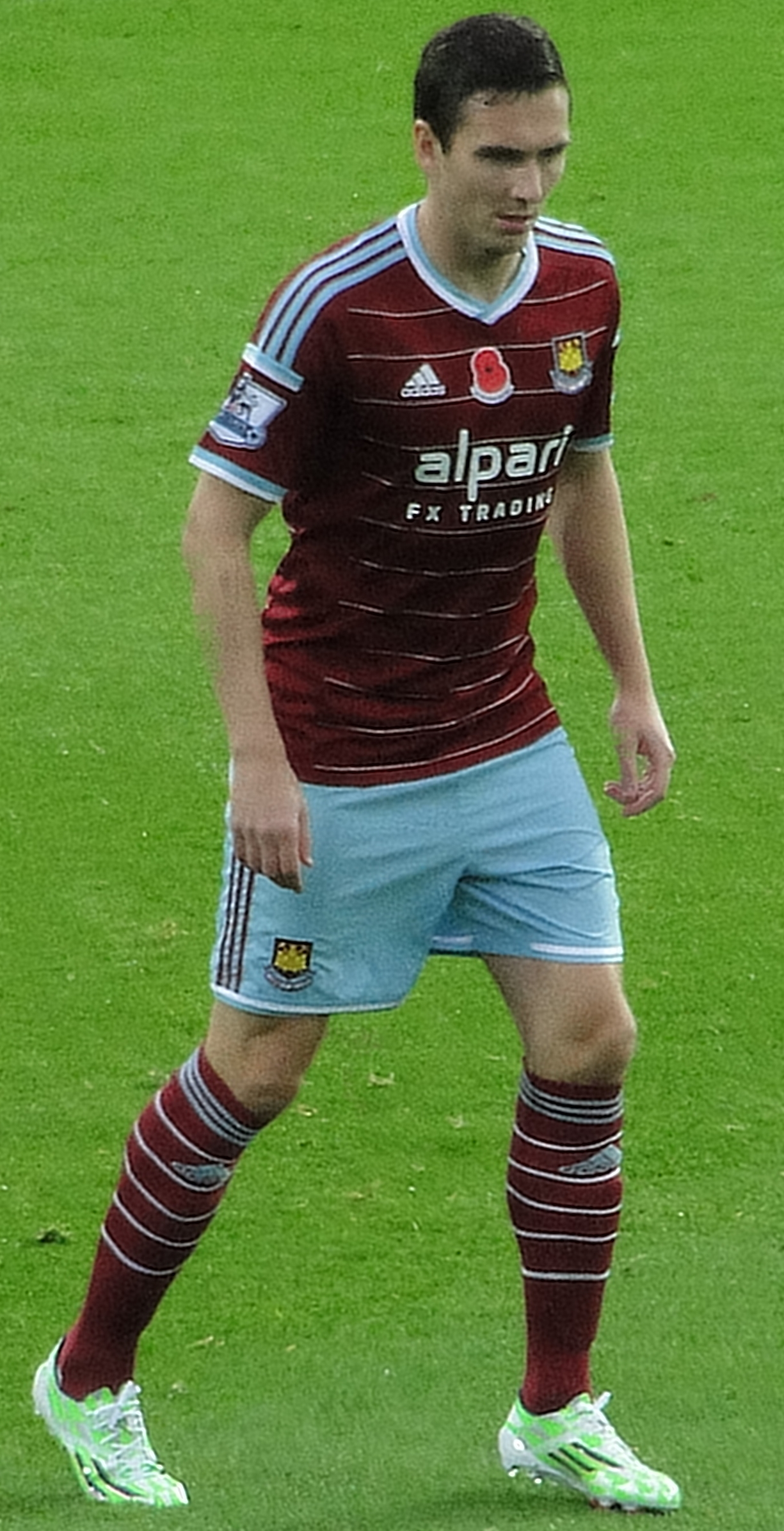
Downing playing for West Ham United in 2014

On 13 August 2013, Downing signed a four-year contract with West Ham United for an undisclosed fee which was reported to be in the region of £5m. He made his debut for the club, coming on as a substitute for Matt Jarvis in the 2–0 home win against Cardiff City at Upton Park on the opening day of the 2013–14 season on 17 August 2013. Downing scored his first goal for West Ham on 3 May 2014 in a 2–0 home win against Tottenham Hotspur.

In the 2014–15 season, Downing scored his first goal of the season against Crystal Palace in a 3–1 away win on 23 August 2014. Downing continued his fine form for West Ham in a diamond formation which saw him being deployed in a central role. On 1 November 2014, Downing scored for West Ham against Stoke City in a 2–2 away draw, with West Ham coming from two goals down to draw 2–2. Downing scored his third goal of the season against Sunderland in a 1–1 draw away from home on 13 December 2014. A week later, he scored against Leicester City, curling a left-footed shot from 20 yards as West Ham won 2–0.

=== Return to Middlesbrough ===
On 16 July 2015, Downing returned to boyhood club Middlesbrough, signing a four-year contract for an undisclosed fee, reported to be in the region of £5.5 million, potentially rising to £7 million if the club were to gain promotion to the Premier League. The first match of his return was on 9 August 2015, a goalless draw away to Preston North End in the first Championship match of the season. On 12 September 2015, he netted the first goal of his second spell, to open a 2–0 win over Milton Keynes Dons at the Riverside. Middlesbrough secured promotion on the final day of the season, after a 1–1 draw with promotion rivals Brighton & Hove Albion at home, gaining automatic promotion as runners-up.

Downing faced competition ahead of the club's first season return in the top flight with the signings of Gastón Ramírez, Viktor Fischer and Adama Traoré. In January 2017, Middlesbrough announced that they would allow Downing to leave on loan during that winter transfer window, as Downing had not been a regular starter throughout the league campaign. Despite interest from Crystal Palace, no move materialised and Downing remained at the club. Downing suffered a second relegation with Middlesbrough, when they were relegated down to the Championship.

After relegation, Downing was informed by new manager Garry Monk that he could leave the club. Birmingham City manager Harry Redknapp offered Downing a two-year contract, but the transfer fell through. Downing soon regained his place at Middlesbrough after Tony Pulis replaced Monk in December. Downing was one of four players released by Middlesbrough at the end of the 2018–19 season, having totalled 404 appearances in his two spells at the club.

=== Blackburn Rovers ===
Downing signed for Championship club Blackburn Rovers on 21 June 2019 on a one-year contract. He scored his first goal for Blackburn in an EFL Cup second round tie against Oldham Athletic on 13 August, a 3–2 home win. Despite being an ever-present throughout the 2019–20 season, Downing's departure from the club was announced on 24 June 2020 on the expiration of his contract.

Despite his previous exit, Downing signed a new contract with Blackburn that November. He once again left the club at the end of his existing contract, this confirmed days after the 2020–21 season concluded. Downing featured less frequently in his second season with Blackburn and after his departure said that he would "probably" retire. In August 2021, he confirmed his retirement from football, having amassed over 700 competitive appearances across a 20-year playing career.

== International career ==
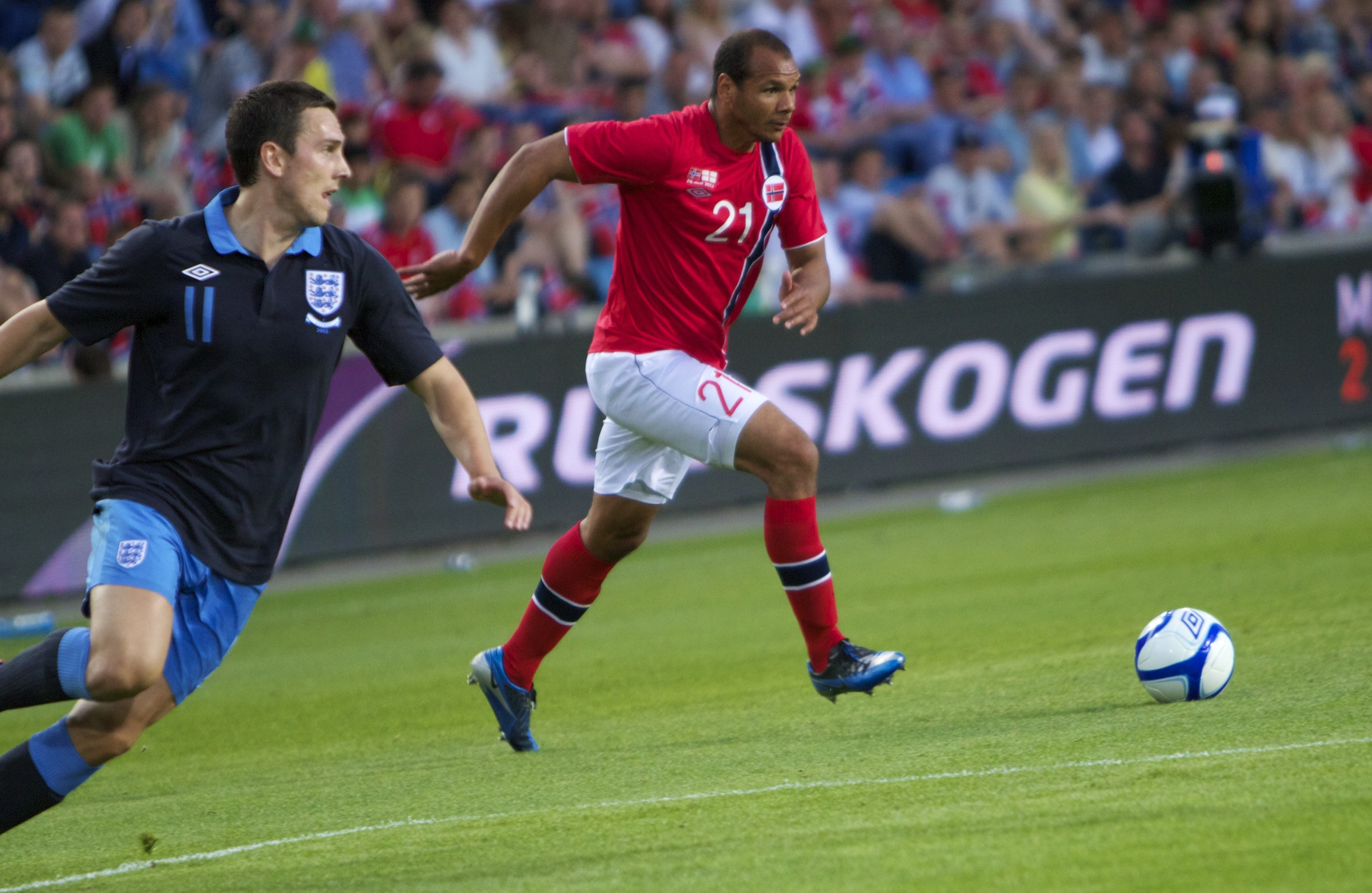
Downing (left) playing for England in 2012

Downing was first called up as a 19-year-old for the 2003 UEFA European Under-19 Championship. With seven under-21 caps to his name, Downing made his England debut on 9 February 2005 in a home friendly, played at Villa Park against the Netherlands, replacing Shaun Wright-Phillips in the second half.

Downing's international career took a setback in May 2005 when he was injured during a training session with England on their tour of the United States, keeping him out of action until 2006. Downing was included in the England World Cup squad in May 2006 by Sven-Göran Eriksson, primarily as a back-up for Joe Cole, and came on as a second-half substitute in England's victorious opening match against Paraguay. He was brought on once again in the match against Trinidad and Tobago, when England scored two goals in the last ten minutes.

On 16 August 2006, Downing made his first start for England, as Greece were beaten by 4–0, with Downing involved in three of the goals. He started the subsequent three Euro 2008 qualifiers, against Andorra and Macedonia. Downing hoped to have proven many of his critics wrong after Fabio Capello became the third successive England manager to give him an England cap, on 26 March 2008 in a 1–0 friendly defeat to France. He was also called up (alongside Middlesbrough teammate David Wheater) for Capello's friendlies against United States and Trinidad and Tobago, where he received the nod ahead of Ashley Young. His performance justified his selection by contributing with the first two goals and won praise from the press who had previously slated his inclusion in the squad. A few months after Capello took charge of England, the Italian manager stated that he had been most impressed by Downing. He was chosen again by Capello to replace Aaron Lennon for the UEFA Euro 2012 qualifier against Montenegro on 12 October 2010. During his second season with Aston Villa, Downing began to feature regularly for England under Capello.

After his transfer to Liverpool, he featured in the two qualifying matches at the start of the season, a 3–0 win against Bulgaria, and a 1–0 win against Wales in which he provided the assist for the only goal of the match scored by former Aston Villa teammate Ashley Young. He also came on at half-time to replace Theo Walcott in the 1–0 win against Spain and started the following match against Sweden which England also won 1–0. On 16 May 2012, new England manager Roy Hodgson named Downing in his 23-man squad for the upcoming UEFA Euro 2012 tournament. He started in a 1–0 win away to Norway on 26 May, which was Hodgson's first match in charge of England. Downing did not make an appearance during UEFA Euro 2012. Having not appeared in a squad since 2012, in November 2014 Downing was called into the squad for England's matches against Slovenia and Scotland.

== Style of play ==
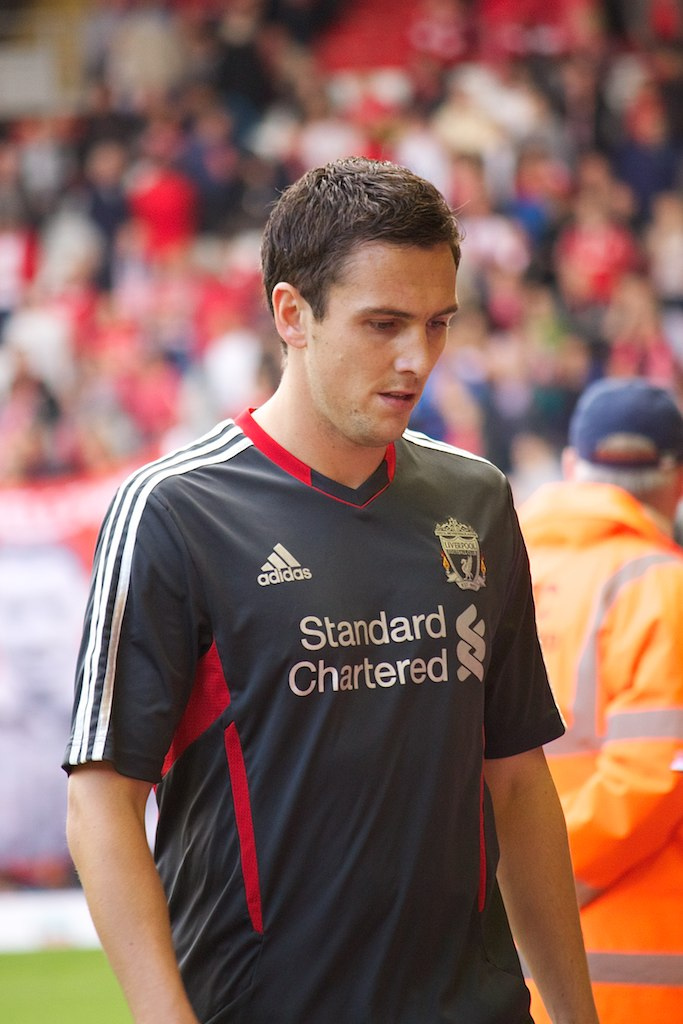
Downing warming up for Liverpool in 2011

Downing primarily played as a left-winger, his key attributes being his dribbling and crossing abilities. He could also operate on the opposite flank, having been integrated onto the right under Gareth Southgate. Downing's preference was to play on the left with his dominant foot, though his function on the right allowed him to come inside to his stronger foot and attack the defender's weak foot.

During the 2012–13 season, Liverpool manager Brendan Rodgers relocated Downing into defence at left-back. Downing did not enjoy playing at left-back, stating it was not his natural position. Under Sam Allardyce at West Ham United, Downing moved into a central attacking midfielder role in which he played at the top of a diamond formation, allowing him to create more chances in open play.

== Coaching career ==
Towards the end of his second spell playing for Middlesbrough, Downing began studying for his UEFA B licence coaching qualification, having been recommended to do so by his then-manager Tony Pulis. During the 2020–21 season, he had a brief spell coaching Blackburn Rovers' under-23s side, combining this role with his playing responsibilities for their senior side. Downing had begun studying for his UEFA A licence upon joining Blackburn in 2019.

In November 2022, Downing began working for his boyhood club Middlesbrough, gaining a part-time role working amongst various age groups within their Academy set-up. He primarily coached within the club's under-14 and under-16 sides. Downing later expressed his ambitions of pursuing a career in management, stating, "I don't have immediate plans for where my coaching will take me, but I'm quite open with where I want to get to one day. I want to be a manager."

In January 2024, Downing was appointed as an assistant coach of Leeds United's under-21s side, becoming part of newly-appointed head coach Scott Gardner's backroom staff. In their first full season in charge, they won the 2024–25 National League Cup for the first time in their history.

== Personal life ==
Downing has been involved in several charitable and community projects outside his playing career. He supports the nationwide No Messin' campaign, along with freestyler Colin Nell and boxer Amir Khan, warning youngsters against playing on railway lines. Downing held a charity dinner with special guest boxer Ricky Hatton to raise funds for the Royal Victoria Infirmary in Newcastle upon Tyne in February 2008. The hospital had cared for Vicky, Stewart's sister, who died of leukaemia in 1993 at the age of 4.

The honorary position of president of Middlesbrough Futsal Club was bestowed on Downing in December 2007. During his spare time Downing has DJ-ed at several nightclubs in Middlesbrough while also playing sets in Ibiza among other places.

Downing's former agent Ian Elliott was arrested by Cleveland Police in September 2008 after he was reported to the police by the player himself after he had concerns "regarding the way his and his company's affairs [had] been handled". Downing told Middlesbrough about his concerns some time earlier and the club advised him to involve lawyers and accountants to investigate, while The Football Association acted as liaison between the police and the club.

== Career statistics ==
=== Club ===
Appearances and goals by club, season and competition
Club	Season	League			FA Cup		League Cup		Other		Total	
Club	Season	Division	Apps	Goals	Apps	Goals	Apps	Goals	Apps	Goals	Apps	Goals
Middlesbrough	2001–02	Premier League	3	0	0	0	0	0	—		3	0
Middlesbrough	2002–03	Premier League	2	0	0	0	1	1	—		3	1
Middlesbrough	2003–04	Premier League	20	0	2	0	2	0	—		24	0
Middlesbrough	2004–05	Premier League	35	5	2	0	2	0	9 (Note: Appearances in UEFA Cup)	1	48	6
Middlesbrough	2005–06	Premier League	12	1	5	0	0	0	9	0	26	1
Middlesbrough	2006–07	Premier League	34	2	8	0	0	0	—		42	2
Middlesbrough	2007–08	Premier League	38	9	5	1	2	0	—		45	10
Middlesbrough	2008–09	Premier League	37	0	5	2	1	0	—		43	2
Middlesbrough	Total		181	17	27	3	8	1	18	1	234	22
Sunderland (loan)	2003–04	First Division	7	3	—		—		—		7	3
Aston Villa	2009–10	Premier League	25	2	6	0	4	1	0	0	35	3
Aston Villa	2010–11	Premier League	38	7	3	0	2	1	1 (Note: Appearance(s) in UEFA Europa League)	0	44	8
Aston Villa	Total		63	9	9	0	6	2	1	0	79	11
Liverpool	2011–12	Premier League	36	0	6	2	4	0	—		46	2
Liverpool	2012–13	Premier League	29	3	2	0	2	0	12	2	45	5
Liverpool	Total		65	3	8	2	6	0	12	2	91	7
West Ham United	2013–14	Premier League	32	1	1	0	4	0	—		37	1
West Ham United	2014–15	Premier League	37	6	4	0	1	0	—		42	6
West Ham United	Total		69	7	5	0	5	0	—		79	7
Middlesbrough	2015–16	Championship	45	3	0	0	4	0	—		49	3
Middlesbrough	2016–17	Premier League	30	1	3	1	1	0	—		34	2
Middlesbrough	2017–18	Championship	40	3	2	0	3	0	2 (Note: Appearances in Championship play-offs)	0	47	3
Middlesbrough	2018–19	Championship	38	2	1	0	1	0	—		40	2
Middlesbrough	Total		153	9	6	1	9	0	2	0	170	10
Blackburn Rovers	2019–20	Championship	41	2	1	0	1	1	—		43	3
Blackburn Rovers	2020–21	Championship	18	0	1	0	0	0	—		19	0
Blackburn Rovers	Total		59	2	2	0	1	1	—		62	3
Career total			597	50	57	6	35	4	33	3	722	63

=== International ===
Appearances and goals by national team and year
National team	Year	Apps	Goals
England	2005	1	0
England	2006	8	0
England	2007	7	0
England	2008	5	0
England	2009	2	0
England	2011	9	0
England	2012	2	0
England	2014	1	0
Total		35	0

== Honours ==
Middlesbrough

- Football League Cup: 2003–04
- UEFA Cup runner-up: 2005–06
- Football League Championship runner-up: 2015–16

Aston Villa

- Football League Cup runner-up: 2009–10

Liverpool

- Football League Cup: 2011–12
- FA Cup runner-up: 2011–12

Individual

- North-East FWA Player of the Year: 2005
- Alan Hardaker Trophy: 2012
- Aston Villa Player of the Season: 2010–11
- Middlesbrough Player of the Year: 2004–05
- Middlesbrough Young Player of the Year: 2003–04
