= University of Nottingham Futsal =

- Full name: University of Nottingham Futsal
- Founded: July 2012
- Ground: David Ross Sports Village
- Manager: Isaac Waladbaigi
- League: FA National Futsal League - North Division 1
- 2017/18: Super League North - 2nd
Home colours	Away colours

University of Nottingham Futsal is a futsal club based at the University of Nottingham, Nottinghamshire, England. It competes in the FA National Futsal Super League, the highest standard of futsal in England.

== History ==
The club was founded in July 2012 after a meeting between Martyn Ware, Daniel Slater and James Moore. After success in university competitions, the club entered the FA National Futsal League in 2013/14 in North Division 2. After a couple of competitive years, the club was selected as an elite group of 16 clubs to make up the 2015/16 FA National Futsal Super League. Shortly after, the club was nominated for the BUCS University Club of the Year.

=== Results ===
The club's final league positions in the FA National Futsal League are listed below

Season	Division	Position	Notes
2013/14	North Division 2	4th	Debut season in the FA National Futsal League
2014/15	North Division 2	2nd	Promoted to Super League North
2015/16	Super League North	7th	
2016/17	Super League North	6th	Relegated to North Division 1 following league restructure
2017/18	North Division 1	2nd	
2018/19	North Division 1		In progress

== Venue ==
The club currently plays its FA National Futsal League matches at Sutton Bonington Sports Centre, in Leicestershire. From season 2015/16, the club will be moving into the newly constructed £40m David Ross Sports Village, at University Park, Nottingham.

== Teams ==
The club is one of the largest in the country, catering for a wide demographic of players. Whilst initially launched with a single male students' team, it has grown to have four men's students' teams, three women's students' teams, an FA National Futsal League team and an Academy for youth players.
