= Graeme Dell =

English futsal coach

Graeme Ryland Frederick Dell (born 8 April 1964) was employed by the Football Association's as England national futsal team coach and has been in that position since the FA started its futsal programme in 2003, when he led the first ever England futsal team in the UEFA Futsal Championships. Dell led England in 51 international futsal matches, including the 2006 UEFA Futsal Championship and the 2008 FIFA Futsal World Cup, before he stepped down on 25 March 2008.

== Early life and education ==
Dell was born in Chalfont St Giles, Buckinghamshire, on 8 April 1964. He was educated at The Chalfonts County Secondary School.

== Career ==
At the age of 21 years and 4 months he was, and remains, the youngest coach to be awarded the FA full coaching licence. Since that time, his reputation has grown as both a football and more latterly a futsal coach. More recently he has been heading up the FA's futsal coach education programme to develop a new breed of coach capable of developing futsal specific players and bringing the game to the wider football community in England. He is widely credited establishing futsal in England.

In 2011, Dell was invited to become a FIFA coaching instructor by the world's governing body of football, one of an elite group worldwide. This significant role combines delivering FIFA coach education courses around the world and assisting FIFA's member associations, whilst acting as an ambassador for the game. In 2014, Dell was further recognized by FIFA as he led his fellow instructors alongside legendary the world champion coach Javier Lozano Cid (Spain) in Madrid, whilst receiving a global mandate from FIFA as its first futsal development consultant, endorsed by Lozano and appeared as further endorsed by FIFA with Dell leading the FIFA Futsal World Cup Technical Study Group in Lithuania in 2021.

Dell was appointed by UEFA as a Futsal Match Delegate in 2023.

On 26 October 2017 The FA confirmed his appointment to the FA Council under new governance reforms of the national games governing body and has served since that time.

His coaching experience across all levels of the game followed a short playing spell at Watford F.C. as a youngster and then with non-league teams.

He has held the post of youth, reserve and first team coach at Wycombe Wanderers F.C. as well as chief 1st X1 scout and Centre of Excellence director at Queens Park Rangers F.C. under the guidance of Don Howe. He has coached abroad on various assignments for several national federations. In the early 1990s, Dell worked as a regional coach for the FA as part of its Centres of Excellence programme, where he was involved in the player review and selection process for each year's intake of the FA National School at Lilleshall, eventually becoming part of technical director Keith Blunt's final assessment staff.

Amongst the coaches he has worked are Sir Bobby Robson, Roy Hodgson, Don Howe, Les Reed and England's most successful youth team coach to date, Ted Powell.

In 2001, he was selected by the British Olympic Association as its representative at the National Olympic Academy in Olympia, Greece.

He has coached the British Universities Sports Association (BUSA) national football team at eight FISU World University Games (Universiade) in 1995, 1997, 1999, 2001, 2003, 2005, 2007 and 2009, most recently losing in the semi-finals to Ukraine on penalty kicks, yet finishing in 4th place, Great Britain's highest position since 1993 at that level. Dell also headed three GB delegations at FISU World University Futsal Championships in 2004, 2006 and 2008 showing progress in all three encounters and winning the FIFA Fair Play Award on three consecutive occasions. In 2007, he was awarded an honorary life membership of the BUSA for over 20 years' contribution to student sport.

In January 2013, Dell was appointed deputy chef de mission for the England team which participated at the XX Commonwealth Games in Glasgow 2014. In his role as head of England's games time operations he is widely credited as a chief architect behind Team England's success in Glasgow, where they topped the medal table with a 28 year high of 174 medals, outstripping their nearest rivals, Australia, by 37 medals. England's largest ever Commonwealth Games team of more than 650 benefitted from a widely acclaimed performance centre (the Lion's Den) which Dell is credited with, whilst establishing the performance environment for the team.

He also established a ground-breaking anti-doping education concept across Team England and, in collaboration with UK Anti Doping, require every one of the 650+ team members to undergo compulsory anti-doping education, setting a new standard for athletes and support personnel at major games before the 2015 world anti-doping code (WADC) changes.

On 22 December 2015, it is recorded at Companies House in London that Dell became a main board Director (Trustee) of the Sports Council Trust Company, the charitable arm of Sport England. Government filings show that he was chair of this company until December 2023 having served a maximum number of terms under the UK Sport Code for Sport Governance and with two time extensions. The Trust has a number of defined objectives including the ownership, management and governance of delivery activities of the National Sports Centres at Bisham Abbey, Lilleshall and Plas y Brenin as well as the Redgrave & Pinsent rowing lake at Caversham in Berkshire.

Dell is also a businessman, and in 2005 he was awarded an honorary Fellowship of the Royal Society for Manufactures and Arts (RSA) and is a business mentor for the Princes Trust. Also in that year, one of his businesses was awarded the Queen's Award for Enterprise.

Recent searches at Companies House show Dell as a non-executive director of several businesses, including @Futsal Limited, a new start up company making a multimillion-pound investment into futsal facilities and educational programmes within the UK. @futsal was funded through private equity and private investment but was closed down by its owners when the English Football League Foundation Trust (EFLFT) opted to conduct its educational programmes in-house and obtain direct educational funding thus making that business model somewhat redundant.
