= Manchester Futsal Club =

- Full name: Manchester Futsal Club
- Founded: March 2006
- Ground: Manchester Velodrome, Manchester
- Capacity: 3,000
- Owner: Manchester Futsal CIC
- Chairman: Simon Wright, Ilya Ovechkin
- Manager: Samuel Richardson
- League: National Futsal Series One
Home colours	Away colours

Manchester Futsal Club is an English professional futsal club based in Greater Manchester. They have competed in the National FA Futsal League since its inception and are one of the most prominent and established futsal clubs in Great Britain. The club was created in March 2006, and was the first futsal club to receive the FA's Charter Standard in England. As well as working with Manchester College, the city's University futsal teams and neighbouring football clubs in the Greater Manchester area, the club also delivers a number of Manchester FA Futsal 5's leagues and futsal specific coaching sessions in local schools, sports clubs and various community projects within the Greater Manchester area.

== First team history ==
=== 2006 - 2013 ===
Upon being established the club competed in the Manchester FA Regional Futsal league from September 2006. Samuel Richardson captained the team to league success in March 2007 with the team scoring more than eighty goals in the fourteen fixtures. 2007 also saw the club compete in its first tournament at the Tees Valley Futsal Cup. The team won all its group and subsequent knockout games before losing a tiring final in extra time and finished runners up to Perth Futsal Club. Towards the latter part of 2007 the FA created the FA Futsal League, complementing the longer standing annual FA Futsal Cup. The team was accepted into the Northern Conference, tying in with the club being one of the first futsal clubs in the country to be accredited at FA Charter Standard.

The club started its first game in the newly formed FA National Northern Conference with a 3–2 loss, Doug Reed eventually led the team to a second-place finish, secured by a win over Sheffield Hallamshire Futsal. Many of the club's players reached double figures, with the club's vice captain Ilya Ovechkin leading the club and northern conference in goals scored. Midway through the season the club appointed the Brazilian tactician Rodrigo Freitas in a dual club manager/coach role, with Simon Wright moving up to a general manager position.

A second-place finish meant they qualified for the National Play-off Finals, the club faced a three-way group, matched against the Midland teams of Ipswich Wolves and Birmingham Tigers. Despite being down 4–0 in their first game, Manchester managed to finish their game with the heavily tipped and reigning champions Ipswich Wolves, 4–4. The second game saw Manchester face Birmingham Tigers, with the fatigue of the first game evident, the Manchester team succumbed to an 8–5 loss, which knocked the club out of the winners brackets. A depleted Ipswich Wolves team later lost in the overall playoff final to Helvecia Futsal, with Manchester finishing 6th overall.

The second season in the National League saw a string of squad changes, with a number of established players leaving the club for various reasons and a number of subsequent new players coming in. The team suffered various team changes due to injuries and the time taken to bed new players to the game, into the team. They finished in third place, missing out on a play-off place by two points, a controversial 5–4 loss to Loughborough University being the most crucial result of the season. Samuel Richardson topped the club's goal scoring, with seven goals, which highlighted the difference between the relative success of 2008's campaign contrasted with the flat 2009 season.

Doug Reed and Ross Farran broke into the England F-30 squad, with Reed later moving on to represent and establish himself within the England international team. Furthermore, Reed went on to sign a one-year deal with Spanish second division team Lanzarote Tias Yaiza at the end of the season, becoming one of the first English players to compete professionally in the country. Farran became one of four winners of the Nike "Most Wanted" Accolades, the winners selected by Manchester United's Sir Alex Ferguson. He shortly became a part of the Nike Academy squad. After being invited by Gothenburg Futsal Club, the club competed in its first game on international soil. Manchester ended the tournament in third place, competing against other clubs from Sweden and Uruguay.

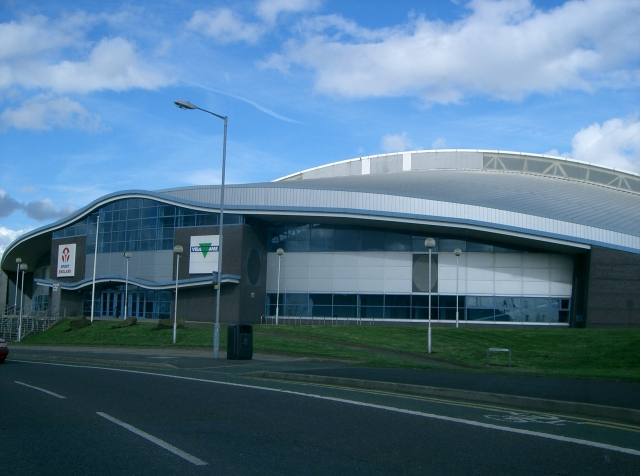
Manchester Velodrome is the club's current home venue

The 2010 campaign started off disappointingly, but under the captaincy of Anthony Haralambous, the team remained unbeaten from their opening day defeat, battling for the Northern Conference title with Sheffield throughout the season. Ultimately, the penultimate game of the season between the two clubs decided the championship, with Sheffield romping to an emphatic 6–1 victory that effectively sealed the title. Manchester remained in second place and in strong contention for a playoff spot, which they secured with a final day 3–2 victory over third-placed Tranmere Victoria.

At the national finals, despite having the majority of the play, Manchester lost their first game to an efficient Team United Birmingham, 3–2. In a closely fought second match, Manchester lost 5-4 to Spartans. Overall results placed Manchester 5th nationally. Helvecia were crowned as national champions for a third time in a row, after beating Spartans in an exhilarating final.

The team also qualified and competed in the FA Futsal Cup 2010, topping their qualifying group unbeaten and in the process avenging their previous years National Finals loss to Team United Birmingham. The team were eventually knocked out in the quarter-finals via a controversial "ghost goal" 1–0 loss to Northern rivals Sheffield. Helvecia were again the eventual winners of the tournament, beating rivals Spartans in an extra time final.

At the start of the year the club's top scorer Samuel Richardson was selected for the England training squad and later made his full international debut for the National team in October 2010, vs. Macedonia.

Manchester's manager and coach, Rodrigo Freitas, announced that the FA Futsal Cup would be his last in charge. In October, the club announced Periklies Antoniou as the new coach of the squad, together with the introduction of assistant coach Daniel Berdejo-del-Fresno to complete the new management line-up. Over the course of the pre-season the new management evaluated the team and the final squad for the National League 2011 was selected in November.

After the previous season's achievements, the club started as strongly tipped contenders for the Northern title. The first game of the season suggested that winning that elusive title would be no guarantee as they drew at home to a strengthened Leeds team. After dropping these two points, the team went on a six-game winning streak, including a 6–4 win over Sheffield, that put the club in pole position midway through the season. Sheffield, the reigning Northern champions, again proved the club's closest rivals come the season's end and after an incredibly tight 25 minutes of action in the returning tie; Sheffield showed a final third ruthless streak that ended in a 7–2 loss for Manchester. The title was still a two horse race, but Manchester held the advantage and only needed to win their remaining fixtures to take the top spot. In the club's final game, a resilient Middlesbrough held on to spring a surprising 3–2 victory over the club, allowed Sheffield to pip the club, with a final fixtures victory over Tranmere Victoria.

For the third successive year, the club qualified for the National Finals. In their first group game, vs Helvecia, the clubs were quite evenly matched throughout large parts of the game, but Helvecia's experience and ability to make scoring opportunities count shone through and they ran out as 4–1 winners. In the second group game the team faced a Chippenham side that was threadbare in squad size. Manchester showed an extreme ruthlessness that carried ten different scorers and finished 20–1, a playoff record. Helvecia successfully defended their hold of the national championship, beating Sheffield in the Grand Final.

This left the FA Futsal Cup as the final tournament of the season for the club. In similar fashion to the club's previous manager, this would also be Periklies Antoniou final weekend as the club head coach. The team topped their group beating Team Baltic to second place due to a greater goal difference. This was helped by the 18–1 thrashing over Team Northumbria, which set the record for the largest FA Futsal Cup finals win.

After beating Passlona in the quarter-finals, the team faced the FA Futsal Cup holders and National Champions, Helvecia. With the game closely poised and looking to go into extra time, Ilya Ovechkin scored a breakaway goal with minutes left and the club saw the game out, setting up a final with Team Baltic. In the final, a Stuart Cook hat trick and goals from Doug Reed and Samuel Richardson sealed a 5–2 victory in the final, confirming the club as 2011 FA Futsal Cup champions. Additionally, some of the club's players received individual awards based on their performances. Doug Reed was named player of the tournament and Daniel Haralambous the tournaments top scorer.

Marcos Leon took charge of the first team and the campaign started with an emphatic opening day 11–1 victory over Tranmere Rovers, but then the club shortly succumbed to their biggest loss in recent years, losing 5–0 at home to Middlesbrough. The magnitude of the loss appeared to galvanise the players and from that point onwards, they remained unbeaten for the remainder of the season.

Crucial last minute goals to earn a vital win away at Sheffield and a draw away at Middlesbrough, meant the team remained in pole position for the majority of the season and they went on to claim their first National League North conference title. In the process they scored 118 goals in the 12 game campaign, whilst only conceding 27 and went on to record the league's largest recorded victory margin, with a 27–0 massacre over Hull Futsal at the Velodrome. Samuel Richardson finished as both the club's and the league's top scorer with 30 goals.

In the first game of the National finals, the team were defeated 9-4 by Oxford Lions who managed to punish Manchester's use of playing with a flying goal keeper for the majority of the game. After Genesis beat Oxford Lions in the second group game, Manchester still had an outside chance to qualify, but they were only able to beat Genesis 7–3. Oxford Lions qualified from the group on goal difference and subsequently lost to Helvecia in the Grand Final. Samuel Richardson finished as the first English golden boot winner at the Grand Finals, with 5 goals.

This campaign was to be Daniel Berdejo-del-Fresno last with the club, as he moved on to be head coach of Sheffield and a part of the newly adjusted England national coaching set up.

At the beginning of the year Stuart Cook returned to the England national squad after a long absence out due to a knee injury and gained his return call up in a friendly match vs. France. At the end of the year he scored his first goal for his country, in a 3–2 victory away against Denmark. In the same year Ross Bond made the progression from the England development squad to the full team and later on in the year made his full international debut vs. Turkey.

In 2013, the team again remained toe to toe all the way to the final game of the season and despite scoring over 100 goals and remaining unbeaten until the final game of the season, a Sheffield victory resigned the club to second position in the North. In the Super League playoffs, they comfortably dispatched Team Birmingham twice, but lost to Helveica who took the one and only finals spot, with Stuart Cook finishing the season as the club's top goal scorer with 22 goals. Subsequently, at the end of this season, Frank Chiarella took over the reins of first team manager.

=== 2014 – 2017 ===
In the 2014 season the team fully focused its attention on returning the title to Manchester. Stuart Cook led the team to romp through to a historical unbeaten North campaign league win, in which the team scored 96 goals and conceded only 27 goals in 14 games on its way to the Super League Finals.

After drawing Loughborough in the semi-finals, an Ilya Ovechkin winner saw the team go through to the finals via a 5–4 victory. and face the high spending Baku United outfit in the final. The final was extremely close, but with 10 minutes left and the game on a knife's edge at 2–1, Stuart Cook was controversially sent off for a second caution and the team was unable to recover from the goal that was scored immediately following this, with Baku eventually running out 5-1 winners.

The club also competed in the FA Futsal Cup finals, which was the first time it returned since they won the competition in 2011. After comfortable progression through their group and smashing Loughborough 6–1 in the semi-finals, thanks in part to a Samuel Richardson hat trick, the club faced Baku United again in the cup final, a repeat of the Grand Final. Despite another close game, Baku were again able to show their strength in depth and ran out 2–0 winners, to complete a double.

Notably, due to various circumstances, the team was never able to produce a squad that included all of Cook, Richardson, Bond, Quintana, Ovechkin and King in any game. Samuel Richardson regained his top goal scorer title, with 29 goals in total.

2015 saw a reformatted FA Futsal Cup and FA Super League, that produced a more congested fixture list for the club. At the beginning of the season, a number of the experienced players left the club and they were replaced with several youngsters with high potential, but whom were relatively inexperienced and this dramatically changed the dynamic of the squad and the focus of the campaign.

Despite the adjustment, the club again went unbeaten throughout their North campaign and retained their title, this time winning every game they played in. Similarly, they comfortably qualified for the FA Futsal Cup finals, finishing runners up in their qualification group behind Baku. In the Super League group, the relatively inexperienced team struggled to find consistency and ended up finishing just outside the qualification spots. Within the season campaign, it was decided that Chris Vernon would take over first team responsibilities from Frank Chiarella going forward.

With the focus on regaining their FA Futsal Cup title, the club managed to again comfortably win their group and beat Genesis, 5–2, in the semi-final, helped in no part to Danny Stapleton who scored in every game up to the final. In the final, they met an even stronger Baku United than previously faced and this was proven with a 3–0 victory to the Azerbaijan backed club, meaning they regained the prestigious cup trophy once again. Samuel Richardson finished as the club's top goal scorer, with 40 goals in total and setting a new season club record.

The 2016 campaign, saw the FA National League's top regional competitions absorb into two main leagues; North and South. Samuel Richardson took over the captaincy, Stuart Cook moved to London Helvecia and England International Jordan Parker moved on to pursue other interest. Due to the squad make-up, their club focused on developing some of the younger players for the longer term benefit of the club. However, the club remained relatively competitive throughout the season and still finished a comfortable second, behind a strong Team Birmingham that had recently brought in a number of experienced overseas players as their core.

The club drew London Helvecia in the Super League playoffs, and similarly to the games against Birmingham earlier on in the season, it competed well in its first game until the final quarter, where the game quickly ran away from Manchester's control and ultimately the difference in experience saw Helvecia win. Helvecia comfortably won the return game, but ended up losing to Oxford Lions on penalties in the Grand Finals. In the FA Futsal Cup, the club made it to the quarter-finals of the competition losing out to surprise package Cambridge United and Oxford Lions beat Genesis in the finals of the FA Futsal Cup, to complete a season double. Samuel Richardson and Raducio King were the joint top scorers over the season with 18 goals each.

The development focus of the current first team proved fruitful, exemplified by Danny Stapleton, Ben Seol, Giles Collier and Jordan Edge all moving up to the England U23's squad and Yussef Abdullahi being selected for England U19's. Furthermore, recent addition to the squad Richard Ward, represented the England national squad in the Main Round of UEFA's European Championships qualifier's.

== First Team Squad 25/26 ==
Note: Flags indicate national team as defined under FIFA eligibility rules; some limited exceptions apply. Players may hold more than one non-FIFA nationality.

No.	Pos.	Nation	Player
1	GK	ENG	Kai Bone
23	GK	LVA	Jans Krumins
7		ENG	Jeff Adubofour
5		NIR	Danny Stapleton
6		ENG	Jake Barnes
14		ENG	Salim Karimi
8		ENG	Raphe Barber
16		BRA	Fabricio Sivla
4		ENG	Matty Barton
19		SDN	Ammar Ahmed

No.	Pos.	Nation	Player
30	GK	PAK	Syed Raza Ali
13	GK	ENG	Myles Chadwick
9		ENG	Jordan Edge (Captain)
10		ENG	Samuel Richardson
11		NED	Raducio King
18		ENG	Scott Thompson
2		ENG	Tomas Uniatowicz
17		ENG	Yussuf Abdullahi
16		SCO	Ahmed Aloulou

== Academy team 25/26 ==
Note: Flags indicate national team as defined under FIFA eligibility rules; some limited exceptions apply. Players may hold more than one non-FIFA nationality.

No.	Pos.	Nation	Player
1	GK	PAK	Syed Raza Ali
—	MF	ENG	Ben Layton
—	MF	ENG	Noah Lucas
—	MF	ENG	Jamie McDonaugh
—	MF	ENG	Lewis Lambkin
—	MF	ENG	Alex Edmed
—	MF	ENG	Joe Cordwell
—	MF	ENG	Olie Baker
—	MF	ENG	Ben Woodard

No.	Pos.	Nation	Player
1	GK	ENG	James Kay
1	GK	IND	Sayantan Chowdury
—	MF	ENG	Matty Barton
—	MF	ENG	Jake Tohill
—	MF	ENG	Thomas Lindsay
—	MF	ENG	Bobby Layton
—	MF	ENG	Tom Mitchell
—	MF	ENG	Eric Woodward
—	MF	ENG	Nathan Perks
—	MF	ENG	Oscar Oomman

== Player Records ==
#	Name	Goals
1	(England) Samuel Richardson	259
2	(Northern Ireland) Danny Stapleton	174
3	(England) Jordan Edge	168
4	(Russia) Ilya Ovechkin	136
5	(Netherlands) Raducio King	108
6	(England) Scott Thompson	104
7	(England) Jeffrey Adubofour	95
8	(England) Stuart Cook	83
9	(England) Jake Barnes	59
10	(Spain) Uriel Araujo	54
11	(England) Dan Haralambous	53

- Statistics from official competition only - UCL, top flight national league and cup games - 07/08 season onwards*

== Manchester Futsal Club Women ==
In 2012, the club established a women's team, who currently compete in the National Futsal Series.

In the 2018-2019 season the team made history by winning both the National FA Futsal league and FA Futsal Cup, the first women's team in English futsal history to do so.

The program is currently headed by manager Neil Lucas, with assistance from Saib George. The team returned to competition in the 2023/2024 season and is currently looking to make a return to Tier 1 National Futsal Series via promotion.

== Manchester Futsal Club Player Pathway ==
The club runs a development programme with the specific longer-term aim of giving younger players an opportunity to compete, play and experience games in a level of competition in order to ready them for the first team. The squads are primarily made up of players that have risen and developed through its youth structure, alongside those in higher education based in the area and the objective is aimed at both male and female players.

=== Development Team ===
The club operates a senior development team to develop and ready its U21 players in preparation for progression to the First Team and compete in the National Series North league. It continues to train and recruit players, preparing them for the transition into the adult squad's and help adapt those that have been brought up within a primarily football-specific environment. It provides a direct link between the academy team and the senior team, supporting the underlining values of a player's pathway and development that is core to the club's values. The club's U19s players also compete in the Manchester Men's Futsal League, along with other arranged fixtures and is currently led by Ryan Williams.

=== Youth Academy ===
Head of youth Ilya Ovechkin develops the club's youth academy program to specifically produce futsal players for the club's academy alongside a team of coaches. This is done theough the use of development centres and the production of teams ranging from u8's through to u16's, with an opportunity pathway for players to compete to the highest levels of the adult game.

==== Youth Team Trips ====
Fundamental to the youth development programme is the provision of opportunities for the club to go abroad and visit various cities and countries of the world, to heighten and increase the experience for players, coaches and the management team as a whole, particularly in regions of the world where the sport is more firmly established. Most notably, the youth teams have visited Murcia in Spain, for the last few years, playing games in the region and linking up with LNFS team ElPozo Murcia FS and CD Murcia FS.

== Manchester International Futsal Tournaments ==
An arm of the club that is involved in the running of local, national and international competitions at all ages and levels, individual and team tours, coaching seminars and futsal specific promotions. A multi-aged Manchester International Futsal Club tournament ran in 2015, at the Velodrome. Over 2016, a series of one day youth specific competitions were held, to promote the game and allow teams familiar and unfamiliar to the sport an opportunity to develop and compete.

== Club Projects ==
Among the club's desire to produce a nationally competitive team on the court, the club also heavily values its role in helping increase the popularity and participation of the sport. It looks to host FA Futsal Level 1 Coaching courses, alongside organising guest speakers and coaching seminars from around the world.

The club has helped introduce and develop teams from the surrounding College and University infrastructures. It currently holds a development partnership with the University of Manchester Futsal team, whilst in the past it has introduced and assisted a Manchester Metropolitan University team in University competition. Similarly, it helped prepare Manchester College for its British College National Futsal Championship, which saw them win the tournament, beating Queen Mary's College in the 2009 final held at the @Futsal Centre in Swindon.

=== Manchester Futsal Leagues ===
Local teams in the Greater Manchester region compete with each other within a multi-team league competition at various venues across the region, with subsequent winners going on to have a chance to represent themselves in the FA Futsal Cup. Currently, the league opportunities are available at both senior and youth level.

=== Professional Futsal League ===
With the imminent arrival of the Professional Futsal League in 2017, a promotional exhibition game between Brazil's Falcao and Portugals' Ricardinho, two of the world's most famous and celebrated futsal players, alongside a number of other professional players was launched. After a worldwide competition was set up to find some players to fill out the respective teams, the club's Raducio King was selected by the panel and chosen by Ricardinho to participate on his team in the game.

=== 10 Year Anniversary ===
In April 2016, the club celebrated its 10-year anniversary at the Velodrome, by hosting a number of its youth teams playing against the comparative team from CD Murcia FS. For the main event and to celebrate the history of the club, a "Team Ovechkin" vs "Team Richardson" game was set up that brought together two squads of past and current players.

=== Kevin Davies All Stars Showcase Game ===
In the summer of 2015, the club linked up with current Bolton and Bury league's ambassador and ex-Bolton Wanderers legend Kevin Davies to help create a promotional showcase game. Hosted at the Velodrome, the first team faced an exhibition team, with the two squads made up of some of the world's best freestyles; Edward Van Gils, Sean Garnier, Issy Hitman and Steve "STR" Roberts, alongside familiar and established futsal and ex-pro footballers, that ran as the main event, either side of the finals of the Bolton and Bury youth futsal competitions.

=== Tiger Street Football ===
The club embarked on a unique Far Eastern trip and competed in the ESPN Star 2011 Tiger Street Football Tournament, held in Singapore, the first of its kind to be staged in Asia, which was a hybrid of predominately street football and cage football, with a futsal ball. The club were invited by ESPN Star to be the UK's representatives in 2011 and 2013, competing alongside the best international street football teams from Brazil, Vietnam, Singapore, Netherlands, Argentina, France, Cambodia, Australia and Thailand, as well as the best local teams at each stage. The team finished 5th in Singapore, 2nd in Malaysia, 1st in the Mongolian leg and finished 5th place overall in the Vietnam Grand Finals.

=== Manchester City FC & CITC Links ===
The club has helped support the preparation for the academy teams that MCFC put forward in the Premier League futsal competitions. In 2018 a selected MFC U20s team was put together to compete with a selection of MCFC U18s players for an exhibition game. Furthermore, it has also forged close ties with Manchester City's "City in the Community", hosting a number of exhibition games between the club's players versus ex-pro players from Manchester City and the CITC coaches to raise the profile of the game. Most recently, the club hosted a CITC team that played the MFC team in a friendly in support of a CITC initiative. The CITC team included ex-professionals such as Patrick Vieria, Terry Phelan and Nigel Gleghorn alongside CITC coaches and was used as an exhibition to raise the profile of the sport.

=== Events Delivered ===
- Umbro International Futsal Tournament 2008 - In 2008 the Umbro International Futsal Tournament made its debut, and it consisted of eight teams from all over the nation, competing over two days. The overall winners of the tournament were Kickers Futsal Club, who comfortably beat London Brazil 6–0 in the final. Futsal Gold/Manchester Maccabi took home the plate competition, beating Ardwick Futsal 6–4 in the final, after extra time.
- Umbro International Futsal Tournament 2009 - The tournament's second year saw a bigger and more competitive tournament, including the addition of two international teams. The semi-finals of the competition were highly energized and presented a good standard of Futsal. KPP Baraberi from Slovakia advanced after a close affair against the returning champions of London-based Kickers Futsal. Norwegian team, Boenes Aires defeated the hosting Manchester Futsal Club in an equally tight game, 3–1. In the final, KPP Baraberi's ability to use the flying goalkeeper and take their chances meant they held the edge over the Norwegian team and ended up winning the final and the overall tournament 4–2. Ardwick Futsal Club took the plate home after an entertaining final against the newly formed Liverpool Futsal Club, with an 8–5 victory.
- Sports Vest - staff from the club delivered an international student futsal tournament. The tournament took place in Lloret De Mar near Barcelona as part of Sportvest 2011, where thousands of students from around the world came together to compete in a range of sports. SportsVest has a huge following as students take time out from their studies and head to the sunshine over the Easter Break and this was the first futsal competition ran at the event.
- Railsport International Futsal Tournament - delivered by the club at the Velodrome, for railway workers from across Europe. The team from the Czech Republic ended up as the eventual winners of the tournament.

=== Other ===
Additionally, the club established itself as a prominent force in the nations futsal community, it has been involved in a large number of coaching sessions in local schools, and community projects such:

- Street Child World Cup
- One Game, One Community
- Greater Manchester Sports in Schools
- Passport to Futsal
