= Azerbaijan–United Kingdom relations =

Bilateral relations

- Azerbaijan: United Kingdom

Diplomatic mission
- Embassy of Azerbaijan, London: Embassy of the United Kingdom, Baku

Envoy
- Ambassador Elin Suleymanov: Ambassador Fergus Auld

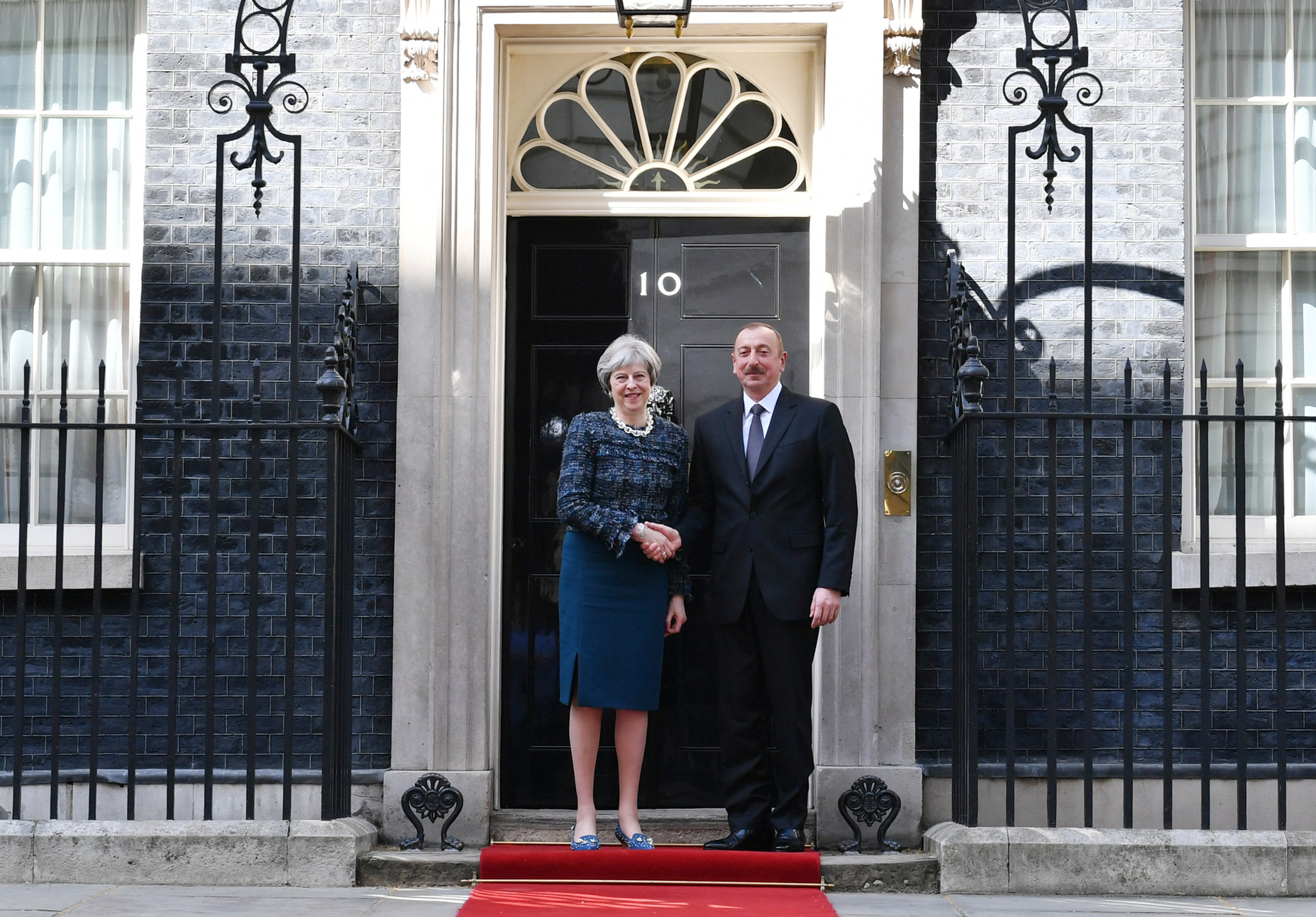
President Ilham Aliyev meets with U.K. Prime Minister Theresa May in London, April 2018

Strong foreign relations exist between the Republic of Azerbaijan and the United Kingdom. The Embassy of United Kingdom in Baku opened in 1992. The Embassy of the Republic of Azerbaijan in London opened in 1994. Both countries are members of the Council of Europe, and the Organization for Security and Co-operation in Europe.

== History ==
At the beginning of the 20th century, the government of Azerbaijan signed an agreement with the British company "Kosmos". Per the agreement, the company organized delivery of Baku oil from Black Sea Port to Europe.

After the Battle of Baku, the Dunsterforce withdrew to Persia in September 1918. The Dunsterforce returned to Baku after the Armistice of Mudros ended the conflict with the Ottoman Empire in November 1918. The force administered the territory under martial law until 1920, when the Bolshevik advance made it impossible for them to stay.

During this time, de facto diplomatic relations existed between the Democratic Republic of Azerbaijan and the British Empire through the British High Commissioner in the Caucasus, which was located in Tbilisi.

== Diplomatic relations ==
The two countries have had official diplomatic relations since 11 March 1992. The independence of Azerbaijan was recognized by the United Kingdom on 31 December 1991.

The first official visit of the President of Azerbaijan Heydar Aliyev to the United Kingdom was on February 22–25, 1994.

The first official visit of Prime Minister Margaret Thatcher to Azerbaijan was in September 1992.

On July 19–24, 1998, President Heydar Aliyev made his second official visit to the United Kingdom and met with Queen Elizabeth II and Prime Minister Tony Blair.

The Azerbaijan-United Kingdom Inter-Parliamentary Friendship Group in Azerbaijani Parliament is chaired by Chingiz Asadullayev. The Azerbaijan All-Party Parliamentary Group in the UK Parliament is chaired by Christopher Pincher.

The British Ambassador to Azerbaijan is Fergus Auld.

The Azerbaijani Ambassador to the United Kingdom is Elin Suleymanov.

== Economic relations ==
At the root of economic cooperation between the Republic of Azerbaijan and the United Kingdom lies the energy industry.

On November 28, 1995, the British-Azerbaijani Chamber of Commerce and Industry was founded. The Chamber represents the business interests of the United Kingdom and the Republic of Azerbaijan.

In September 2009 was established Britain – Azerbaijan Business Council (BABC). The Council promotes trade and investment between Azerbaijan and Britain.

=== Imports and exports ===
Imports of Azerbaijan
Year	Amount Thousands of USD
2020	296,972.09
2021	271,197.31 ▼
2022	256,656.03 ▼

Exports of Azerbaijan
Year	Amount Thousands of USD
2020	157,527.03
2021	396,673.52 ▲
2022	779,541.24 ▲

== Cultural relations ==
The basis of cultural collaboration between Azerbaijan and the United Kingdom was established on February 23, 1994. This date is marked by the signing of the Agreement on cooperation in the sphere of education, science, and culture between two countries. The Agreement was signed by President Heydar Aliyev and Prime Minister John Major.

In 1997 was founded the Anglo-Azerbaijani Society. The Co-Chairman of the Society in London is Lord German. The Co-Chairman of the Society in Baku is Nargiz Pashayeva. The Society participates in mutual cultural understanding between Azerbaijan and Great Britain, organizes charity events, supports young talents in Britain.

== High level visits ==
=== Ministerial visits from the United Kingdom to Azerbaijan ===
William Hague, Foreign Secretary paid a visit to Baku to participate at the signing ceremony of the investment document on The Shah Deniz 2 gas project in December 2013.

President İlham Aliyev met with Charles Hendry, Prime Minister's Trade Envoy to Azerbaijan in November 2013.

Charles Hendry, Minister of State for Energy and Climate Change visited to Baku and met with Natig Aliyev, Azerbaijani Minister of Industry and Energy for discussion of the draft on the long-term exploration of offshore block "Shafag-Asiman" in September 2011.

David Lidington, Minister of State for Europe visited to Azerbaijan and met with President Ilham Aliyev, as well as the Ministers for Foreign Affairs, Economic Development, and Transport on October 20–22, 2010.

Lord Hunt, Minister of State for Energy visited to Baku on 15–17 September 2009. During these days, he met with President Ilham Aliyev and SOCAR President Rovnag Abdullayev and also delivered a speech at the Gas Infrastructure World Caspian Conference.

Lord Digby Jones, Minister for Trade and Investment visited Azerbaijan to participate in the 15th Anniversary International Caspian Oil and Gas Exhibition and Conference in June 2008.

Jim Murphy, Minister of State for Europe visited to Baku and met with Azerbaijani Ministers and officials and representatives to discuss on energy, security and commercial lobbying, NATO/South Caucasus, human rights and Counter Terrorism on May 7, 2008.

=== Ministerial visits from Azerbaijan to the United Kingdom ===
William Hague, UK Foreign Secretary received the Foreign Minister Elmar Mammadyarov on September 3–5, 2013 and Mammadyarov participated and made a speech at the International Institute for Strategic Studies.

Abulfas Garayev, Minister of Culture and Tourism visited London for participating at the World Travel Market exhibition in November 2012 and met with Edward Vaizey UK Minister for Culture, Communications and the Creative Industries.

Elmar Mammadyarov, Minister of Foreign Affairs paid a working visit UK in April 2012.

== Bilateral agreements ==
- Agreement on cooperation in education, science and culture (23 February 1994);
- Double taxation Convention (23 February 1994);
- Memorandum on the field of energy cooperation (23 February 1994);
- Memorandum of Understanding on Communication (23 February 1994);
- Agreement on concerning air transport (23 February 1994);
- Memorandum on the establishment of the Azerbaijan-British Trade and Industry Council (29 November 1995);
- Agreement on protection and promotion of investments (4 January 1996);
- Memorandum of Understanding on Customs issues (7 July 1997);
- Joint Declaration on Friendly Relations and Partnership (21 June 1998).
- Memorandum of Understanding on Defense Cooperation (21 August 2004);
- Joint Communiqué signed during President Ilham Aliyev's official visit to London (14 December 2004);
- Joint Communiqué signed during President Ilham Aliyev's official visit to London (13 July 2009).
- Joint Declaration on a Strategic Partnership (12 November 2026)

== Resident diplomatic missions ==
- Azerbaijan has an embassy in London.
- the United Kingdom has an embassy in Baku.

== See also ==
- Foreign relations of Azerbaijan
- Foreign relations of the United Kingdom
- Azerbaijanis in the United Kingdom
- Petroleum industry in Azerbaijan
- BP
