= Baku United FC =

Baku United
- Full name: Baku United FC
- Founded: 2008
- Ground: London, England
- Chairman: Ilham Nagiyev
- Manager: Chema Jiménez
- League: FA Futsal League
- 2012–13: 1
| Home colours | Away colours |

Baku United FC is a futsal club based in London, England. In 2014, the club became first English side to reach UEFA Futsal Cup.

== History ==
Baku United futsal club was founded in 2008 by the Odlar Yurdu Organisation. Back at that time the Odlar Yurdu Organisation formed a number of amateur futsal teams made up of students studying in London. In addition to holding amateur tournaments among themselves, those teams occasionally were united in a single body and played against other clubs. Later on this historical tradition has given rise to the name Baku United.

Starting from the early years of its establishment the team participated in several tournaments organised in the UK. The first tournament that Baku United took part was "Heydar Aliyev" Cup futsal tournament organised by the Odlar Yurdu Diaspora Organisation. The mentioned tournament was organised exceptionally in the UK in 2008–2010. Following its success, the Czech Republic was added in 2011, Romania and Austria were included in 2012 into the list of countries where the tournament was organised. 2013 was a year of great accomplishment with the tournament organised in 8 countries with participation of 88 teams. In 2009, Baku United became the champion of "Heydar Aliyev" Cup futsal tournament.

Another competition that Baku United took part was annual Lobanovski tournament held in the UK. Despite still being newborn, the club triumphed in 2009 and won the stated cup.

Following the high accomplishments as an amateur team, the new priority for the club has become to transform and develop itself into a professional team. As a result, the club started to co-operate with Spartans Futsal Club. In 2012, two teams were merged under the name of Baku United.

In 2012–2013, the club joined the England's National Futsal League as a professional team. Just in one year the newly formed professional club managed to win the championship in England's Super League in 2013 and gained a right to represent England in UEFA Futsal Cup next year. It became the first English club to play in the main round of UEFA Futsal Cup.

Chairman of Baku United FC is Ilham Nagiyev, an Azerbaijani entrepreneur, co-founder and Chairman of the Supervisory Board of GESCO OJSC and Bine Agro CJSC.

=== UEFA Futsal Cup ===
==== 2013–14 ====
===== Preliminary round =====
| Season | Competition | Round | Country | Opponent | Result | Venue |
|---|---|---|---|---|---|---|
| 2013/14 | UEFA Futsal Cup | Preliminary Round | (Poland) | Wisła | 7:0 | Hala Widowiskowo-Sportowa, Bochnia |
| 2013/14 | UEFA Futsal Cup | Preliminary Round | (Montenegro) | Bijelo Polje | 5:0 (Note: Match forfeited. Preliminary round. Group B.) | Hala Widowiskowo-Sportowa, Bochnia |
| 2013/14 | UEFA Futsal Cup | Preliminary Round | (Albania) | KS Ali Demi | 4:1 | Hala Widowiskowo-Sportowa, Bochnia |

Not

===== Group B =====
| | Clubs | P | W | D | L | F | A | +/- | Pts |
|---|---|---|---|---|---|---|---|---|---|
| 1 | (England) Baku United FC | 3 | 3 | 0 | 0 | 16 | 1 | 15 | 9 |
| 2 | (Poland) Wisła Kraków | 3 | 2 | 0 | 1 | 10 | 7 | 3 | 6 |
| 3 | (Albania) KS Ali Demi | 3 | 1 | 0 | 2 | 6 | 9 | −3 | 3 |
| 4 | (Montenegro) KF Jedinstvo Bijelo Polje | 3 | 0 | 0 | 3 | 0 | 15 | −15 | 0 |

Legend
P: Played W: Won D: Drawn L: Lost F: For A: Against +/-: Goal difference

===== Main round =====
| Season | Competition | Round | Country | Opponent | Result | Venue |
|---|---|---|---|---|---|---|
| 2013/14 | UEFA Futsal Cup | Main round | (Czech Republic) | FK EP Chrudim | 3:3 | Tassos Papadopoulos, Nicosia |
| 2013/14 | UEFA Futsal Cup | Main round | (Cyprus) | Omonia | 1:0 | Tassos Papadopoulos, Nicosia |
| 2013/14 | UEFA Futsal Cup | Main round | (Slovenia) | FC Litija | 2:3 | Tassos Papadopoulos, Nicosia |

===== Group 4 =====
| | Clubs | P | W | D | L | F | A | +/- | Pts |
|---|---|---|---|---|---|---|---|---|---|
| 1 | (Czech Republic) FK EP Chrudim | 3 | 2 | 1 | 0 | 13 | 7 | 6 | 7 |
| 2 | (Slovenia) FC Litija | 3 | 2 | 0 | 1 | 13 | 8 | 5 | 6 |
| 3 | (England) Baku United FC | 3 | 1 | 1 | 1 | 6 | 6 | 0 | 4 |
| 4 | (Cyprus) AC Omonia Nicosia | 3 | 0 | 0 | 3 | 1 | 12 | −11 | 0 |

Legend
P: Played W: Won D: Drawn L: Lost F: For A: Against +/-: Goal difference

== Honours ==
=== Domestic ===
==== League ====
- FA Futsal League: 2
  - 2013, 2014, 2015

==== Tournament ====
- "Haydar Aliev Cup" İnternational Tournament
  - 2009
- Lobanovski Tournament
  - 2009

== See also ==
- FA Futsal League
- Futsal in England
- British Azerbaijanis
- Odlar Yurdu Organisation
