= National Futsal Series =

Professional futsal league

The FA National Futsal Series
- Abbreviation: NFS
- Formation: 8 April 2019; 7 years ago
- Type: Sports League
- Region served: England
- Owner: The Football Association
- Website: nationalfutsalseries.com

The FA National Futsal Series (NFS) is the highest-level English futsal league system, that runs the major futsal competitions in England for men and women. It was founded in 2019 by The FA.

== History ==
Following the launch of The FA first ever strategy for futsal "Fast Forward with Futsal" in 2018, The FA developed the National Futsal Series competitions to provide an opportunity to continue the transformation of futsal across England.

The FA National Futsal Series inaugural season was in 2019/2020. The 2019/2020 season started in September and continued to March. The season was not concluded due to the COVID-19 pandemic.

On the 22 September 2021, BT announced a new three-year agreement which will see seven weekends of the 2021/22 National Futsal Series Men’s Tier One and Women’s Super Series season shown live on BT Sport. This continued with the rebranding of BT Sport, with games during the 2022/23 and 2023/24 seasons shown live on TNT Sport.

== Competitions ==
=== Men's ===
- FA NFS Tier 1
- FA NFS Tier 2 North
- FA NFS Tier 2 South
- NFS League Cup
- NFS/NFL National Cup
- NFS/NFL League Plate

=== Women's ===
- Women Super Series Tier 1
- Women Super Series (Tier 2) North
- Women Super Series (Tier 2) South
- Women's League Cup
- Women's League Plate

== Clubs ==
=== Current Teams ===
==== Men's Teams ====
Division	Team	Year Joined	Home Venue
Tier 1	Bolton Futsal Club	2019	Ordsall Leisure Centre
Tier 1	Bloomsbury Futsal Club (formerly Pro Futsal London)	2019	Aldenham Sports Centre
Tier 1	Hartpury (Formerly Worcester Futsal Club)	2019	Hartpury University
Tier 1	Kent United Futsal Club	2019	Medway Park
Tier 1	Liverpool Futsal Club	2020	Various
Tier 1	London Genesis Futsal Club	2019	University of East London
Tier 1	Loughborough Students Futsal Club	2019	Sir David Wallace Sports Hall
Tier 1	Maidenhead United Futsal (formerly Reading Royals)	2020	Bradfield College
Tier 1	Manchester Futsal Club	2019	National Cycling Centre
Tier 1	Wessex Futsal Club	2020	Andover Sports and Leisure Centre
Tier 2 North	Athletico City Futsal Club	2025	Thorns Collegiate Academy
Tier 2 North	Birmingham WLV Futsal Club	2019	University of Wolverhampton
Tier 2 North	Bolton Futsal Club "B"	2019	Ordsall Leisure Centre
Tier 2 North	East Riding Futsal Club	2019	Allam Sports Centre
Tier 2 North	Hull Eagles Futsal Club	2025	Allam Sports Centre
Tier 2 North	Loughborough Students Futsal Club "B"	2019	Sir David Wallace Sports Hall
Tier 2 North	Manchester Futsal Club "B"	2019	National Cycling Centre
Tier 2 North	University of Sunderland Futsal Club	2019	University of Sunderland
Tier 2 North	West Yorkshire Futsal Club	2024	Leeds Beckett University
Tier 2 North	York Futsal Vikings	2020	York Sport Arena
Tier 2 South	Baku United (formerly London Baku)	2019	University of East London
Tier 2 South	Bloomsbury Futsal Club "B"	2019	Aldenham Sports Centre
Tier 2 South	Braintree Futsal Club	2023	St John Payne Catholic School
Tier 2 South	Cambridge Futsal Club	2019	University of Cambridge
Tier 2 South	Dorset Futsal Club	2025	Poole Grammar School
Tier 2 South	Futsal 360 Bristol	2025	Winterbourne Academy Sports Village
Tier 2 South	London International Futsal Club	2025	Coombe Wood School
Tier 2 South	MK Mavericks Futsal Club	2019	University of Bedfordshire
Tier 2 South	Sporting Club Southend Futsal	2020	Southend Leisure and Tennis Centre
Tier 2 South	Southampton Athletic Futsal Club	2022	Southampton Solent University
Tier 2 South	West London Futsal Club (LDN Movements)	2024	Moberly Leisure Centre

- Correct as of 2025-2026 season.
  - Development or "B" teams are unable to be promoted into the same division as their first team.

==== Women's Teams ====
Division	Team	Year Joined	Home Venue
Tier 1	MK Mavericks (formerly Bedford Futsal Club)	2019	University of Bedfordshire
Tier 1	Birmingham WLV Futsal Club	2019	University of Wolverhampton
Tier 1	Bloomsbury Futsal Club	2021	Aldenham Sports Centre
Tier 1	Bolton Futsal Club	2020	Ordsall Leisure Centre
Tier 1	Futsal 360 Bristol (formerly Hartpury Futsal Club)	2021	Hartpury University
Tier 1	London Helvecia Futsal Club	2019	Ark Elvin Academy
Tier 1	London Genesis Futsal Club	2020	University of East London
Tier 1	Southampton Aztecs Futsal Club	2021	Cams Hill School
Tier 2	Bootham Futsal Club York	2022	York St John University
Tier 2	City of Peterborough Futsal Club	2023	St Ives Sports Centre
Tier 2	Dorset Futsal Club	2023	Avonbourne Academy
Tier 2	Manchester Futsal Club	2019	National Cycling Centre
Tier 2	Project Futsal Liverpool	2022	Greenbank Sports Academy
Tier 2	Maidenhead United Futsal (formerly Reading Royals)	2020	Bradfield College
Tier 2	Southampton Athletic Futsal Club	2025	Southampton Solent University
Tier 2	Southampton Aztecs Futsal Club "B"	2021	Cams Hill School

- Correct as of 2025-2026 season.
  - Development or "B" teams are unable to be promoted into the same division as their first team.

== Champions ==
Men's

Season	Champion
2019-2020	Voided due to COVID-19
2021 Summer Showdown	London Helvecia
2021-2022	London Helvecia
2022-2023	Bloomsbury Futsal Club
2023-2024	Manchester Futsal Club
2024-2025	Bolton Futsal Club
2026-2026	London Genesis Futsal

Women's

Season	Champion
2019-2020	Voided due to COVID-19
2021 Summer Showdown	London Helvecia
2021-2022	London Helvecia
2022-2023	Bloomsbury Futsal Club
2023-2024	London Helvecia
2024-2025	Bloomsbury Futsal Club

== Matchball ==
Season	Matchball Manufacturer
2019-2020	Nike
2021 Summer Showdown	Nike
2021-2022	Umbro
2022-2023	Umbro
2023-2024	Derbystar
2024-2025	Derbystar
2025-2026	Derbystar
2026-2027	Derbystar

== See also ==
- England national futsal team
- England women's national futsal team
- The Football Association
