= FA Futsal Cup =

The FA Futsal Cup is a national competition organised by the Football Association in the game of futsal.

In 2005, Doncaster College for the Deaf became the first disability side to win a major open football competition.

== Winners (Men) ==
- 2003 - Sheffield Hallam
- 2004 - Team USSR
- 2005 - Doncaster College
- 2006 - White Bear
- 2007 - Ipswich Wolves
- 2008 - Helvécia
- 2009 - Helvécia
- 2010 - Helvécia
- 2011 - Manchester Futsal Club
- 2012 - competition cancelled
- 2013 - competition cancelled
- 2014 - Baku United FC
- 2015 - Baku United FC
- 2016 - Oxford City Lions
- 2017 - Baku United FC
- 2018 - Helvécia
- 2019 - Helvécia

== Winners (Women) ==
- 2014 - University of Gloucestershire
- 2015 - Bristol City Futsal Club
- 2017 - South London Ladies Futsal Club
- 2018 - South London Ladies Futsal Club
- 2019 - Manchester Futsal Club

== Finals ==
FA Futsal Cup Men's
Year	Winner	Score	Runners up	Venue	Top Goalscorer
2005	Doncaster College	3 - 2	Baltic United Futsal Club		
2014	Baku United Futsal Club	2 - 0	Manchester Futsal Club	The Copper Box Arena	Jose Lozano, 7
2015	Baku United Futsal Club	3 - 0	Manchester Futsal Club	The Copper Box Arena	
2016	Oxford City Lions Futsal Club	6 - 4	Genesis Futsal Club	National Cycling Centre	
2017	London Baku United Futsal Club	10 - 2	Sussex Futsal Club	University of Wolverhampton	Jarrod Basger, 8
2018	London Helvecia Futsal Club	2 - 1	Reading Escolla Futsal Club	University of Wolverhampton	
2019	London Helvecia Futsal Club	7 - 0	Cambridge United Futsal Club	St Georges Park	

FA Futsal Cup Women's
Year	Winner	Score	Runners up	Venue	Top Goalscorer
2014	University of Gloucestershire	3 - 1	Norton & Stockton Ancients	The Copper Box Arena	Georgie Lane, 9
2015	Bristol City Futsal Club	6 - 1	University of Gloucestershire	The Copper Box Arena	
2017	South London Ladies Futsal Club	8 - 3	Preston Newall	University of Wolverhampton	
2018	South London Ladies Futsal Club	6 - 3	University of Birmingham	University of Wolverhampton	
2019	Manchester Futsal Club	3 - 0	London United Futsal Club	St Georges Park	

== See also ==
- FA Futsal League
