= Helvécia Futsal Club =

London Helvecia
- Full name: London Helvecia Futsal Club Ladies
- Nickname: Helvecia
- Founded: 2007
- Ground: London, England
- Chairman: Virgílio Guimarães
- Coach: Enrique Guillen
- League: National Futsal Series
- 2025/2026: Overall table: 4th Playoffs: Semifinals
- Website: http://www.londonhelveciafutsal.com/
Home colours	Away colours

London Helvecia is a futsal club based in London, England (United Kingdom). Founded in 2007, they compete in the FA National Futsal Series, the top division of English Futsal.

Helvecia are the most successful Futsal club in England, having won 9 league titles, 6 FA cups and have represented England in the UEFA Futsal cup / Champions League more times than any other English club.

Helvecia won their first major honour in 2008, complete a league and FA Futsal cup double. During the 2008/09 season Helvecia qualified for the then UEFA Futsal Cup (now Champions League) for their first time. Though Helvecia have yet to proceed past the preliminary rounds they have represented England 9 times in the competition.

Helvecia home kit colours are blue and white. The club's local rivals are Bloomsbury Football.

== Crest and colours ==
Crest

Helvecia have had two, which all underwent minor variations. The most recent change came in 2019, where the colours of the crest were amended to reflect the origins of the club along with the style and size of the central ball.

Colours

Helvecia has always worn blue and white kits. Often these colours would be solid or a mixture of both colours. Home kits featured a dominant blue, with away kits always in white.

== Helvecia Women ==
Helvecia also operate a women's Futsal team, London Helvecia Women's Futsal Club. They have been affiliated to the men's team since 2018. They play their home games at Leyton Leisure Centre.

== Helvecia Academy ==
Helvecia started its academy during the 2019/20 season. Initially created of upper phase age ranges the appointment at the end of the 2018/19 season was the start of the building of the academy. The academy has two centres; the primary camp in London and the other in the midlands. This allows Helvecia to attract the best young players from the widest spectrum throughout the UK. The academy caters for U6 to U16 players, and includes the community initiatives of the club.

== Honours ==
=== Domestic ===
==== League Titles ====
- National Futsal Series: 3
  - 2019/20, 2020/21, 2021/22
- National Futsal League: 6
  - 2008/09, 2009/10, 2010/11, 2011/12, 2016/17, 2018/19

==== Cups ====
- FA Futsal Cups: 6
  - 2008, 2009, 2010, 2011, 2018, 2019

=== UEFA Futsal Cup / Champions League ===
Appearances: 9

Season	Competition	Round	Country	Opponent	Result	Venue (Host City)	Qualified
2009-10	UEFA Futsal Cup	Preliminary Round	(France)	Roubaix Futsal	6–4	Tapiola Urheiluhalli (Espoo)	2nd place
2009-10	UEFA Futsal Cup	Preliminary Round	(Finland)	Golden Futsal Team	4–6	Tapiola Urheiluhalli (Espoo)	2nd place
2009-10	UEFA Futsal Cup	Preliminary Round	(Scotland)	Fair City Santos	11–2	Tapiola Urheiluhalli (Espoo)	2nd place
2010-11	UEFA Futsal Cup	Preliminary Round	(Andorra)	FC Encamp	4–2	Magvassy Mihály; Sportcsarnok (Győr)	2nd place
2010-11	UEFA Futsal Cup	Preliminary Round	(Switzerland)	MNK Croatia 97	3–2	Magvassy Mihály; Sportcsarnok (Győr)	2nd place
2010-11	UEFA Futsal Cup	Preliminary Round	(Hungary)	Győri ETO FC	2–7	Magvassy Mihály; Sportcsarnok (Győr)	2nd place
2011-12	UEFA Futsal Cup	Preliminary Round	(Austria)	Stella Rossa	7–3	Hollgasse Hall (Vienna)	2nd place
2011-12	UEFA Futsal Cup	Preliminary Round	(Hungary)	Győri ETO FC	1–6	Hollgasse Hall (Vienna)	2nd place
2011-12	UEFA Futsal Cup	Preliminary Round	(Estonia)	Anzhi Tallinn	5–0	Hollgasse Hall (Vienna)	2nd place
2012-13	UEFA Futsal Cup	Preliminary Round	(Albania)	Edro Vlorë	2–1	Birkerød; Iorietscenter (Birkerød)	3rd place
2012-13	UEFA Futsal Cup	Preliminary Round	(Belarus)	Lidselmash Lida	1–2	Birkerød; Iorietscenter (Birkerød)	3rd place
2012-13	UEFA Futsal Cup	Preliminary Round	(Denmark)	København Futsal	2–7	Birkerød; Iorietscenter (Birkerød)	3rd place
2017-18	UEFA Futsal Cup	Preliminary Round	(Republic of Ireland)	Transylvania	7–0	Sporthalle; Weissenstein (Bern)	2nd place
2017-18	UEFA Futsal Cup	Preliminary Round	(Gibraltar)	Lynx	6–1	Sporthalle; Weissenstein (Bern)	2nd place
2017-18	UEFA Futsal Cup	Preliminary Round	(Switzerland)	Minerva	1–4	Sporthalle; Weissenstein (Bern)	2nd place
2019–20	UEFA Futsal; Champions League	Preliminary Round	(Scotland)	PYF Saltires	7-3	Sporthal; De Opgang (Zwaag)	2nd place
2019–20	UEFA Futsal; Champions League	Preliminary Round	(Gibraltar)	Lynx	9-4	Sporthal; De Opgang (Zwaag)	2nd place
2019–20	UEFA Futsal; Champions League	Preliminary Round	(Netherlands)	Hovocubo	1-4	Sporthal; De Opgang (Zwaag)	2nd place
2020–21	UEFA Futsal; Champions League	Preliminary Round	(Luxembourg)	Differdange 03	0-6	Complexe Sportif (Cosnes-et-Romain)	
2021–22	UEFA Futsal; Champions League	Preliminary Round	(Germany)	TSV Weilimdorf	7-9	Glaspalast (Sindelfingen)	3rd place
2021–22	UEFA Futsal; Champions League	Preliminary Round	(Kosovo)	Liqeni	6-7	Glaspalast (Sindelfingen)	3rd place
2021–22	UEFA Futsal; Champions League	Preliminary Round	(Turkey)	Tavşançalı	8-2	Glaspalast (Sindelfingen)	3rd place
2022–23	UEFA Futsal; Champions League	Preliminary Round	(Gibraltar)	Europa	15-0	FFA Technical; Center Academy (Yerevan)	2nd place
2022–23	UEFA Futsal; Champions League	Preliminary Round	(Latvia)	Petrow	9-6	FFA Technical; Center Academy (Yerevan)	2nd place
2022–23	UEFA Futsal; Champions League	Preliminary Round	(Armenia)	Yerevan FC	4-8	FFA Technical; Center Academy (Yerevan)	2nd place

== Current squad ==
As of 30 October 2022

#	Position	Name	Nationality
1	Goalkeeper	Dimar Blanco	(Dominican Republic)
13	Goalkeeper	Liam Hine	(England)
20	Goalkeeper	Coco	(Spain)
2	Defender	Frankie Franz	(England)
3	Defender	Vinicius Sampaio	(Brazil)
5	Defender	Eduardo Tijerín	(Spain)
6	Defender	Iván Dju	(Portugal)
7	Defender	Leandro Paiva	(Brazil)
4	Winger	Leonardo Oliveira	(Brazil)
8	Winger	Liam Palfreeman	(England)
9	Winger	Camilo Restrepo	(England)
10	Winger	Lucas Totti	(Italy)
15	Winger	Fernando Malta	(Portugal)
16	Winger	Wygor da Silva	(Brazil)
11	Pivot	Claudio Ribeiro	(Portugal)
12	Pivot	Denerson Moreira	(Brazil)
14	Pivot	Thiago Bucci	(Italy)

== Notable players – past and present ==
- Maximilian William Kilman
- José Carlos Lopez Lozano
- Carlos Muñoz Delgado
- Eduardo A Gomes
- Ari Santos
- Raoni Medina
- Vitor Hugo
- Lucas Totti
- Thiago Diorio

== See also ==
- FA Futsal League
- Futsal in England
