= National Futsal League =

Futsal league in England

- Founded: 2008
- Country: England
- Confederation: UEFA
- Number of clubs: 40
- Domestic cup: FA Futsal Cup
- Most championships: Helvécia Futsal Club (6)
- Website: https://nationalfutsalleague.co.uk/

The National Futsal League is the third futsal league in England. Founded in 2008, it is a community interest company owned and controlled by its member clubs and administered by an annually elected board of directors.

The FA National Futsal Super League was the highest level of futsal within England until 2019 and the champions became England's representatives in the UEFA Futsal Cup.

From the 2019/20 season the FA National Futsal Series replaced the National Futsal League as the highest level of futsal in England, meaning that the champion of the National Futsal League would no longer be England's representatives in the UEFA Futsal Champions League.

The National Futsal League currently makes up the third tier of men's English Futsal, and is split into five regions: North, Midlands, South West, South and South East.

After the initial first phase of the four regional leagues, the league splits into Tier 3.1 North and South, with the top 3 from the North qualifiers and the Midlands qualifiers going into the Tier 3.1 North, and the top 2 from the South West, South and South East qualifying for Tier 3.1 South. The remaining teams are split into Tier 3.2 North and South. The winners of Tier 3.1 North and South automatically earn promotion to the FA National Futsal Series Tier 2, whilst 2nd and 3rd place from both leagues play each other to determine the remaining 2 promotion spots.

The winners of Tier 3.1 North and South play a final to compete for the Tier 3 National Championship, whilst the winners of Tier 3.2 North and South play a final to compete in a final for the Tier 3 National Plate.

== Clubs ==
=== Current clubs ===
Division	Team
Tier 3 North	Barrow Futsal Club
Tier 3 North	Inspired Futsal Tameside
Tier 3 North	Rochdale Futsal Club
Tier 3 North	Sala Futsal Club
Tier 3 Midlands	City Of Peterborough Futsal Club
Tier 3 Midlands	PSA Futsal Club
Tier 3 Midlands	Leicester Athletic Futsal Club
Tier 3 Midlands	MK Mavericks Futsal Club "B"
Tier 3 Midlands	Bucks Futsal Club
Tier 3 Midlands	University of Nottingham Futsal Club
Tier 3 South West	Sporting United
Tier 3 South West	Dynamo Tekkers Futsal Club
Tier 3 South West	Futsal 360 Bristol "B"
Tier 3 South West	FC Cayman
Tier 3 South East	Greenwich Futsal Club
Tier 3 South East	London Galaxy Futsal Club
Tier 3 South East	GOL FFC
Tier 3 South East	Newham Futsal Club
Tier 3 South East	SS Elite Surrey
Tier 3 South	Portsmouth & Southsea
Tier 3 South	Farnborough FC Futsal
Tier 3 South	Wessex B
Tier 3 South	Southampton Aztecs

=== Champions ===
Season	League champions	Runner-up
2008-09	Helvécia (1)	Ipswich Wolves
2009-10	Helvécia (2)	Tranmere Victoria
2010-11	Helvécia (3)	Spartans
2011-12	Helvécia (4)	Sheffield
2012-13	Baku United (1)	Helvécia
2013-14	Baku United (2)	Manchester
2014-15	Baku United (3)	Birmingham
2015-16	Oxford City (1)	Helvécia
2016-17	Helvécia (5)	London Baku
2017-18	Reading Escolla (1)	Helvécia
2018-19	Helvécia (6)	Loughborough
2019-20*	Oxford City Futsal/Reading Royals Futsal	Sporting Club Southend Futsal/Cambridge Futsal
2020-21	Voided due to Covid-19 pandemic	
2021-22	East Riding Futsal Club	Reading Royals A
2021-22	Southampton Athletic Futsal Club	Bolton Futsal Club 'B'
2024-25	London International	Athletico City Birmingham
