= England national futsal team =

National futsal team

England
- Nickname(s): The Three Lions
- Association: The Football Association
- Confederation: UEFA (Europe)
- Head coach: John Tapia Owens
- Asst coach: Stuart Cook
- Captain: Russell Goldstein
- Most caps: Luke Ballinger
- Top scorer: Luke Ballinger
- FIFA code: ENG
- FIFA ranking: 97 (24 September 2026)
Home colours	Away colours

First international
- England 5–1 Scotland (Rome, Italy; 16 July 1983)

Biggest win
- England 16–1 Northern Ireland (Cardiff, Wales; 3 December 2016)

Biggest defeat
- Portugal 24–1 England (Algarve, Portugal; 21 October 2004)

FIFA World Cup
- Appearances: 0

AMF World Cup
- Appearances: 3 (First in 1988)
- Best result: First Round (1988, 1991, 1997)

European Championship
- Appearances: 0

The England national futsal team represents England during international futsal competitions such as the FIFA Futsal World Cup and the European championships.

The team is governed by The Football Association and delivered by England Futsal Limited. The national team was reformed in 2003, after futsal started to gain popularity.

Home matches are played at various venues around the country. Friendly matches are played with teams from other European nations, and also compete in Four Nations Tournaments each season, along with teams around Europe. England has entered the World Futsal Cup but failed to qualify in 2008.

In September 2020 the FA cut fundings for futsal and grassroots football. Therefore, the future of the English national futsal team was put into question.

In 2024, the England men's and women's national futsal teams returned, playing in Qualifiers for their respective international tournaments.

== Competition history ==
=== FIFA World Cup ===
FIFA Futsal World Cup record										Qualification record						
Year	Round	Position	Pld	W	D	L	GF	GA	Squad	Outcome	Pld	W	D	L	GF	GA
(Netherlands) 1989	Did not enter									Did not enter						
(Hong Kong) 1992	Did not enter									Did not enter						
(Spain) 1996	Did not enter									Did not enter						
(Guatemala) 2000	Did not enter									Did not enter						
(Taiwan) 2004	Did not enter									Did not enter						
(Brazil) 2008	Did not qualify									Group 4 4th place	3	0	0	3	3	29
(Thailand) 2012	Did not qualify									Group C runners-up	3	2	0	1	9	12
(Colombia) 2016	Did not qualify									Group 1 4th place	6	3	0	3	16	23
(Lithuania) 2021	Did not qualify									Group 4 4th place	6	2	0	4	13	20
(Uzbekistan) 2024	Did not enter									Did not enter						
2028	Did not qualify									Group B 3rd place	3	1	0	2	15	9
Total	—	0/11	0	0	0	0	0	0	—	5/10	21	8	0	13	56	93

=== UEFA European Futsal Championship ===
UEFA European Futsal Championship Record
Year	Round	Pld	W	D	L	GS	GA
Spain 1996	did not Enter	-	-	-	-	-	-
Spain 1999	did not Enter	-	-	-	-	-	-
Russia 2001	did not Enter	-	-	-	-	-	-
Italy 2003	did not Enter	-	-	-	-	-	-
Czech Republic 2005	did not Qualify	-	-	-	-	-	-
Portugal 2007	did not Qualify	-	-	-	-	-	-
Hungary 2010	did not Qualify	-	-	-	-	-	-
Croatia 2012	did not Qualify	-	-	-	-	-	-
Belgium 2014	did not Qualify	-	-	-	-	-	-
Serbia 2016	did not Qualify	-	-	-	-	-	-
Slovenia 2018	did not Qualify	-	-	-	-	-	-
Netherlands 2022	Withdrew	-	-	-	-	-	-
Latvia/Lithuania/Slovenia 2026	did not Qualify	-	-	-	-	-	-
Total	0/13	0	0	0	0	0	0

=== Minor tournaments ===
Year	Tournament	City	Round	Position	GP	W	D*	L	GS	GA
2004	Four Nations	Algarve	Group	4th	3	0	0	3	8	50
2004	Four Nations	Manchester	Group	3rd	2	0	0	2	7	19
2005	Four Nations	Villeneuve-d'Ascq	3rd/4th	4th	2	0	0	2	6	10
2006	Four Nations	Sheffield	Group	4th	3	0	1	2	8	24
2006	Four Nations	Edegem	Group	4th	3	0	0	3	6	27
2007	Four Nations	İzmir	Group	4th	3	0	0	3	2	28
2008	KL World 5's	Kuala Lumpur	Group	5th	4	0	0	4	9	38
2008	Four Nations	Caen	3rd/4th	4th	2	0	0	2	2	12
2008	Four Nations	Loughborough	Group	3rd	3	0	1	2	4	10
2010	Four Nations	Hereford	Final	2nd	2	1	0	1	8	4
2012	Tournament	Bodø	Group	2nd	2	1	1	0	4	3
2013	Four Nations	Paola	Group	3rd	3	1	1	1	4	5
Total			0 titles		30	3	4	23	61	211

Red border colour indicates tournament was held on home soil.

== Players ==
=== Current squad ===
The following players were called up to the squad for the 2028 FIFA Futsal World Cup qualifying matches against Switzerland, Northern Ireland and Sweden on 7, 8 and 10 April 2026 respectively.

No.	Pos.	Player	Date of birth (age)	Caps	Goals	Club
1	GK	Jonny Sim	21 December 1991 (age 34)			(Scottish Football Association) Futsal Escocia
22	GK	Jack Walsh	22 January 2000 (age 26)			(The Football Association) Maidenhead United Futsal
4	DF	Jamie Brooker	19 May 2005 (age 21)			(The Football Association) Bloomsbury Futsal Club
5	DF	Harry Tozer	24 May 2000 (age 26)			(The Football Association) Maidenhead United Futsal
6	DF	Jake Barnes	17 May 2002 (age 24)			(The Football Association) Manchester Futsal Club
9	DF	Jordan Edge	11 October 1998 (age 27)			(The Football Association) Manchester Futsal Club
17	DF	Charles Kuehn	3 March 1992 (age 34)			(The Football Association) Genesis Futsal Club
2	FW	Russell Goldstein (captain)	13 January 1994 (age 32)			(The Football Association) Bloomsbury Futsal Club
7	FW	Jeffrey Adubofour	6 March 1997 (age 29)			(The Football Association) Manchester Futsal Club
8	FW	Liam Palfreeman	15 August 1995 (age 31)			(The Football Association) West London Futsal Club
10	FW	Eduardo Amorim	28 July 2001 (age 25)			(The Football Association) Genesis Futsal Club
11	FW	Richard Ward	13 August 1991 (age 35)			(The Football Association) Genesis Futsal Club
12	FW	Tyler Cook	1 November 2007 (age 18)			(The Football Association) Bolton Futsal Club
15	FW	Jack Tysom	17 November 2000 (age 25)			(The Football Association) Hartpury Futsal Club

=== Recent call-ups ===
The following players have also been called up to the squad within the last 12 months.

Pos.	Player	Date of birth (age)	Caps	Goals	Club	Latest call-up
DF	Jed Devine	1 January 2005 (age 21)			(England) York Futsal Club	v. Germany, 6 February 2026
DF	Tomas Uniatowicz	29 April 2004 (age 22)			(England) Manchester Futsal Club	v. Germany, 6 February 2026
FW	Ivan Cadete-Borges^{INJ}	30 November 2003 (age 22)			(England) Genesis Futsal Club	v. Germany, 6 February 2026
^{INJ} Player withdrew from the squad due to an injury.^{PRE} Preliminary squad.^{RET} Retired from international futsal.
