= 2006–07 Middlesbrough F.C. season =

Middlesbrough
2006–07 season
- Chairman: Steve Gibson
- Manager: Gareth Southgate
- Premier League: 12th
- FA Cup: Sixth round
- League Cup: Second round
- Top goalscorer: League: Mark Viduka (14); All: Mark Viduka (19)
- Highest home attendance: 33,308 v Man Utd; Away: 75,967 v Man Utd
- Lowest home attendance: 16,702 v Hull City; Away: 17,520 v Hull City

During the 2006–07 season, Middlesbrough participated in the Premier League.

== Team kit and sponsors ==
Middlesbrough's kits were once again produced by Errea, and sponsored by 888.com for the third season running. The club retained the white band of the previous two seasons.

Home colours
Away colours

== Search for a new manager ==
On 4 May 2006, Steve McClaren was chosen to take over as the manager of the England national team after the 2006 FIFA World Cup. Managers linked to take over as new Boro boss included Terry Venables, Martin O'Neill, Tony Mowbray and Alan Curbishley, with Steve Gibson expecting whoever took over to achieve a Champions League place in the near future. Venables declined the job offer citing an unwillingness to return to full-time management. Venables subsequently joined McClaren as England's assistant coach.

Gibson then looked within his own club and decided to name club captain Gareth Southgate as manager. Southgate signed a five-year contract and decided to finish his playing career, at the age of 35, to focus entirely on his new job. His appointment was controversial as he did not possess the coaching qualifications required to manage a Premier League football club. However, at a Premier League meeting on 22 November 2006, Southgate was granted a dispensation to continue in his role until the end of the season, during which time it was announced that he will study for the Uefa Pro A Licence.

== Transfers ==
=== Summer transfer window ===
Several players, including Jimmy Floyd Hasselbaink and Doriva left the club at the end of the previous season, and Franck Queudrue was sold to Fulham for £3 million. Argentinian left-back Julio Arca was signed from local rivals Sunderland for a fee of £1.75m, and young Frenchman Herold Goulon was signed from Olympique Lyonnais on a three-year deal.

Southgate signed two international defenders to strengthen up his backline following the second game of the season. England international Jonathan Woodgate joined his home-town team on loan from Real Madrid, while Chelsea's German international centreback Robert Huth signed for a fee of £6 million. Charlton Athletic's Jamaican international striker Jason Euell was signed on the final day of the transfer window.

=== January transfer window ===
Lee Dong-Gook arrived from Pohang Steelers in the January transfer window, while Ray Parlour, Ugo Ehiogu and Massimo Maccarone all left the club for free.

=== Summary ===
==== In ====
Date	Player	Previous club	Fee	Ref
12 July 2006	(France) Herold Goulon	(France) Olympique Lyonnais	Undisclosed	
26 July 2006	(Argentina) Julio Arca	Sunderland	£1.75 million	
30 August 2006	(Germany) Robert Huth	Chelsea	£6 million	
31 August 2006	(Jamaica) Jason Euell	Charlton Athletic	£300,000	
31 January 2007	(South Korea) Lee Dong-Gook	(South Korea) Pohang Steelers	Free	

==== Loans in ====
Date	Player	Club from	Period	Ref
30 August 2006	(England) Jonathan Woodgate	(Spain) Real Madrid	Full season	

==== Out ====
For departures of players out of contract at the end of 2005–06 see 2005–06 Middlesbrough F.C. season.

Date	Player	New club	Fee	Ref
27 July 2006	(France) Franck Queudrue	Fulham	£3 million	
5 January 2007	(England) Kevin Burgess	Darlington	Free	
25 January 2007	(England) Ugo Ehiogu	(Scotland) Rangers	Free	
30 January 2007	(Italy) Massimo Maccarone	(Italy) Siena	Free	
9 February 2007	(England) Ray Parlour	Hull City	Free	
14 May 2007	(England) Malcolm Christie	-	Out of contract	
15 May 2007	(Portugal) Abel Xavier	(United States) Los Angeles Galaxy	Out of contract	
1 June 2007	(England) Stuart Parnaby	Birmingham City	Out of contract	
6 June 2007	(England) Danny Graham	Carlisle United	Out of contract	
7 June 2007	(Australia) Mark Viduka	Newcastle	Out of contract	
3 July 2007	(England) Daryl Robson	(Republic of Ireland) Galway United	Free	

==== Loans out ====
Date	Player	Club at	Period	Ref
2 August 2006	(England) Danny Graham	Blackpool	1 month	
4 August 2006	(Australia) Brad Jones	Sheffield Wednesday	3 months	
25 August 2006	(England) David Knight	Oldham Athletic	1 month	
28 September 2006	(England) David Wheater	Wolverhampton Wanderers	To 16 November 2006^{[A]}	
16 October 2006	(England) Adam Johnson	Leeds United	1 month	
27 October 2006	(England) Tom Craddock	(Wales) Wrexham	3 days^{[B]}	
3 November 2006	(England) Jason Kennedy	Boston United	3 months	
13 November 2006	(England) Matthew Bates	Ipswich	1 month	
23 November 2006	(England) Ugo Ehiogu	Leeds United	To 2007-01-01	
1 January 2007	(England) Danny Graham	Carlisle United	To 2007-04-22	
8 January 2007	(England) David Wheater	Darlington	3 months	
2 March 2007	(England) Jason Kennedy	Bury	3 months	
9 March 2007	(England) Josh Walker	AFC Bournemouth	1 month	

==== Notes ====
^{A} Wheater's loan was initially intended to last three months, but he was returned to Middlesbrough after making only one appearance.
^{B} Craddock's loan was initially intended to last one month, but he was injured in his first game and returned to Middlesbrough.

== Squad ==
=== Senior squad ===
==== Appearances and goals ====
Appearance and goalscoring records for all the players who were in the Middlesbrough F.C. first team squad during the 2006-07 season.

No.	Pos	Nat	Player	Total		Premier League		FA Cup		League Cup	
No.	Pos	Nat	Player	Apps	Goals	Apps	Goals	Apps	Goals	Apps	Goals
1	GK	(Australia) AUS	Mark Schwarzer	42	0	36	0	6	0	0	0
2	DF	(England) ENG	Stuart Parnaby	21	0	9+9	0	1+1	0	1	0
3	MF	(Argentina) ARG	Julio Arca	28	3	18+3	2	7	1	0	0
4	DF	(England) ENG	Ugo Ehiogu	1	0	0	0	0+1	0	0	0
5	DF	(England) ENG	Chris Riggott	7	0	5+1	0	1	0	0	0
6	MF	(Spain) ESP	Gaizka Mendieta	8	0	4+3	0	0	0	1	0
7	MF	(Netherlands) NED	George Boateng	41	2	35	1	6	1	0	0
8	DF	(England) ENG	Jonathan Woodgate	36	0	30	0	6	0	0	0
9	FW	(Australia) AUS	Mark Viduka	37	19	22+7	14	6+1	5	1	0
10	MF	(Brazil) BRA	Fábio Rochemback	22	2	17+3	2	1+1	0	0	0
11	FW	(England) ENG	Malcolm Christie	17	2	4+9	1	2+2	1	0	0
12	DF	(Austria) AUT	Emanuel Pogatetz	42	2	35	2	7	0	0	0
14	DF	(Germany) GER	Robert Huth	14	1	8+4	1	0+1	0	1	0
16	FW	(Jamaica) JAM	Jason Euell	20	0	9+8	0	0+2	0	0+1	0
17	DF	(Portugal) POR	Abel Xavier	20	1	14	1	6	0	0	0
18	FW	(South Korea) KOR	Lee Dong-Gook	11	0	3+6	0	0+2	0	0	0
19	MF	(England) ENG	Stewart Downing	42	2	34	2	8	0	0	0
20	FW	(Nigeria) NGR	Yakubu	45	16	36+1	12	8	4	0	0
21	GK	(England) ENG	Ross Turnbull	1	0	0	0	0	0	1	0
22	GK	(Australia) AUS	Brad Jones	4	0	2	0	2	0	0	0
23	FW	(Italy) ITA	Massimo Maccarone	8	1	1+6	1	0	0	1	0
24	DF	(England) ENG	Andrew Davies	26	0	21+2	0	2+1	0	0	0
25	MF	(England) ENG	James Morrison	36	2	15+13	2	2+5	0	0+1	0
26	DF	(England) ENG	Matthew Bates	2	0	0+1	0	0	0	1	0
27	MF	(England) ENG	Lee Cattermole	39	2	22+9	1	7	1	1	0
28	MF	(England) ENG	Adam Johnson	16	0	3+9	0	1+2	0	1	0
29	DF	(England) ENG	Anthony McMahon	1	0	0	0	0	0	1	0
30	FW	(England) ENG	Danny Graham	1	0	0+1	0	0	0	0	0
31	DF	(England) ENG	David Wheater	2	1	1+1	1	0	0	0	0
33	DF	(England) ENG	Andrew Taylor	42	0	34	0	7	0	1	0
38	DF	(England) ENG	Seb Hines	2	1	0	0	2	1	0	0

==== Discipline ====
Disciplinary records for 2006-07 league and cup matches. Players with 1 card or more included only.

No.	Nat.	Player	Yellow cards	Red cards
1	(Australia)	Mark Schwarzer	1	0
2	(England)	Stuart Parnaby	2	0
3	(Argentina)	Julio Arca	3	0
5	(England)	Chris Riggott	1	0
7	(Netherlands)	George Boateng	8	2
8	(England)	Jonathan Woodgate	5	0
9	(Australia)	Mark Viduka	2	0
10	(Brazil)	Fábio Rochemback	6	0
11	(England)	Malcolm Christie	1	0
12	(Austria)	Emanuel Pogatetz	12	0
14	(Germany)	Robert Huth	3	0
16	(Jamaica)	Jason Euell	3	0
17	(Portugal)	Abel Xavier	3	0
19	(England)	Stewart Downing	4	0
20	(Nigeria)	Yakubu	2	0
23	(Italy)	Massimo Maccarone	2	0
24	(England)	Andrew Davies	3	0
25	(England)	James Morrison	0	1
27	(England)	Lee Cattermole	12	0
28	(England)	Adam Johnson	1	0
33	(England)	Andrew Taylor	3	0

=== Academy squad ===
Academy players for 2006-07 season.

Nat.	Position	Player	Academy year
(England)	GK	Matthew Atkinson	1
(England)	DF	Joe Bennett	1
(England)	FW	Jonathan Franks	1
(England)	MF	David Hillerby	1
(England)	DF	Lewis McCardle	1
(England)	DF	Brent Howell	1
(England)	FW	Nathan Porritt	1
(Canada)	MF	Shaun Saiko	1
(England)	GK	Jason Steele	1
(England)	DF	Lewis Walker	1
(England)	FW	Nathan Fisher	2
(England)	DF	Jason Honeyman	2
(England)	DF	John Johnson	2
(England)	DF	Richard Langthorne	2
(England)	MF	Daryl Robson	2
(England)	FW	Stephen Thompson	2
(England)	MF	Josh Walker	2
(England)	FW	Peter Watling	2
(England)	DF	Kevin Burgess	3
(England)	MF	Lee Cattermole	3
(France)	MF	Hérold Goulon	3
(England)	DF	Seb Hines	3
(England)	FW	Ben Hutchinson	3
(England)	MF	Graeme Owens	3
(Wales)	DF	Rhys Williams	3

== Pre-season ==
=== Results ===
Win Draw Loss

Note: Results are given with Middlesbrough score listed first.

Game	Date	Venue	Opponent	Result F–A	Attendance	Boro Goalscorers	Report
1	22 July 2006	A	Rangers	0–1	31,544		Report
2	22 July 2006	A	Darlington	0–1			Report
3	25 July 2006	A	Barnsley	3–1	3,971	Yakubu (2), Maccarone	Report
4	25 July 2006	A	York City	1–0	1,342	Morrison 55'	Report
5	28 July 2006	A	Doncaster Rovers	0–2	3,452		Report
6	29 July 2006	A	Sheffield Wednesday	2–1	5,684	Christie, Yakubu	Report
7	3 August 2006	N	Athletic Bilbao	0–1			Report
8	3 August 2006	A	FC Cologne	0–2			Report
9	6 August 2006	A	Feyenoord	0–2			Report
10	8 August 2006	A	Heerenveen	0–4			Report
11	12 August 2006	H	Chievo	0–0	8,647		Report

== Premier League ==
Southgate's managerial reign started with a 3–2 defeat at newly promoted Reading, but was followed up by a 2–1 win home victory over reigning Premier League champions Chelsea. Boro were brought crashing down to Earth straight afterwards though with a 4–0 home defeat to Portsmouth.

Overall, Middlesbrough's form in 2006–07 was indifferent. Promising results such as the surprising home victory over Chelsea were coupled with the team losing away from home to all three newly promoted Premiership sides. It took until mid-January for Boro to register their first away win of the season, at struggling Charlton Athletic, their first away win since April of the year before. They comprehensively beat Bolton Wanderers 5–1 at home in January, their biggest victory of the season.

Middlesbrough ultimately finished 12th in the table with 46 points, winning twelve, drawing ten and losing sixteen matches - slightly better than last season, but their dismal form in the early and late part of the season prevented them from attaining an even higher position and at one time put them in danger of being relegated. The fact that they were 8 points away from a UEFA Cup spot and 8 points away from getting relegated neatly summed up their season.

=== Results ===
Win Draw Loss

Note: Results are given with Middlesbrough score listed first. Man of the Match is according to mfc.co.uk.

Game	Date	Venue	Opponent	Result F–A	Attendance	Boro Goalscorers	Man of the Match	Report
1	19 August 2006	A	Reading	2–3	23,855	Downing 11', Yakubu 21'	Viduka	Report
2	23 August 2006	H	Chelsea	2–1	29,198	Pogatetz 80', Viduka 90'	Pogatetz	Report
3	28 August 2006	H	Portsmouth	0–4	24,834		Downing	Report
4	9 September 2006	A	Arsenal	1–1	60,007	Morrison 22'	Woodgate	Report
5	16 September 2006	A	Bolton Wanderers	0–0	21,164		Pogatetz	Report
6	23 September 2006	H	Blackburn Rovers	0–1	24,959		Pogatetz	Report
7	30 September 2006	A	Sheffield United	1–2	27,483	Yakubu 49'	Schwarzer	Report
8	14 October 2006	H	Everton	2–1	27,156	Yakubu 27' (pen.), Viduka 71'	Huth	Report
9	22 October 2006	H	Newcastle United	1–0	30,060	Yakubu 85'	Downing	Report
10	30 October 2006, 20:00	A	Manchester City	0–1	36,720		Maccarone	Report
11	4 November 2006	A	Watford	0–2	18,951		Downing	Report
12	11 November 2006	H	West Ham United	1–0	25,898	Maccarone 74'	Downing	Report
13	18 November 2006	H	Liverpool	0–0	31,424		Woodgate	Report
14	25 November 2006	A	Aston Villa	1–1	33,162	Christie 43'	Christie	Report
15	2 December 2006	H	Manchester United	1–2	31,238	Morrison 66'	Huth	Report
16	5 December 2006	A	Tottenham Hotspur	1–2	34,154	Huth 80'	Huth	Report
17	9 December 2006	H	Wigan Athletic	1–1	23,638	Yakubu 67'	Viduka	Report
18	18 December 2006	A	Fulham	1–2	16,891	Viduka 74'	Yakubu	Report
19	23 December 2006	H	Charlton	2–0	32,013	Yakubu 29', Arca 52'	Arca	Report
20	26 December 2006	A	Everton	0–0	38,126		Woodgate	Report
21	30 December 2006	A	Blackburn Rovers	1–2	22,653	Yakubu 61' (pen.)	Cattermole	Report
22	1 January 2007	H	Sheffield United	3–1	27,963	Viduka 36', Yakubu (2) 69', 76' (pen.)	Yakubu	Report
23	13 January 2007	A	Charlton Athletic	3–1	26,384	Cattermole 45', Arca 63', Yakubu 68'	Viduka	Report
24	20 January 2007	H	Bolton Wanderers	5–1	24,614	Speed 6' (o.g.), Xavier 10', Viduka (2) 23', 84', Downing 43'	Viduka	Report
25	30 January 2007	A	Portsmouth	0–0	19,820		Woodgate	Report
26	3 February 2007	H	Arsenal	1–1	31,122	Yakubu 63' (pen.)	Arca	Report
27	10 February 2007	A	Chelsea	0–3	41,699		Davies	Report
28	24 February 2007	H	Reading	2–1	26,412	Viduka 7', Yakubu 69'	Viduka	Report
29	3 March 2007	A	Newcastle United	0–0	52,303		Woodgate	Report
30	17 March 2007	H	Manchester City	0–2	26,427		Downing	Report
31	31 March 2007	A	West Ham United	0–2	34,977		Xavier	Report
32	7 April 2007	H	Watford	4–1	25,534	Viduka (2) 5', 75', Boateng 27', Rochemback 79'	Johnson	Report
33	14 April 2007	H	Aston Villa	1–3	26,959	Rochemback 13'	Taylor	Report
34	18 April 2007	A	Liverpool	0–2	41,458		Pogatetz	Report
35	21 April 2007	A	Manchester United	1–1	75,967	Viduka 45+1'	Pogatetz	Report
36	28 April 2007	H	Tottenham Hotspur	2–3	27,861	Viduka 66', Pogatetz 89'	Rochemback	Report
37	5 May 2007	A	Wigan Athletic	1–0	21,204	Viduka 29'	Pogatetz	Report
38	13 May 2007	H	Fulham	3–1	29,556	Viduka (2) 34', 47', Wheater 45+3'	Viduka	Report

=== Classification ===
Pos	Team	Pld	W	D	L	GF	GA	GD	Pts	Qualification or relegation
10	Blackburn Rovers	38	15	7	16	52	54	−2	52	Qualification for the Intertoto Cup third round (Note: The highest-placed team who applied for the Intertoto Cup and not in an automatic UEFA Cup spot was awarded with a place in that competition. Blackburn Rovers occupied the Intertoto place, because Portsmouth and Reading did not apply. A further place in the UEFA Cup was up for grabs via the Premiership Fair Play League. The winner is placed into a draw with the winners of Fair Play leagues in other countries. The representatives from the two countries that come out of the hat first are given a place in the UEFA Cup first qualifying round. Since the winners of the Premiership Fair Play League, Tottenham Hotspur, had already qualified for the UEFA Cup by virtue of their league position, their place in the Fair Play draw was given to Aston Villa. However, the places in the UEFA Cup were awarded to the representatives from Finland and Norway.)
11	Aston Villa	38	11	17	10	43	41	+2	50	
12	Middlesbrough	38	12	10	16	44	49	−5	46	
13	Newcastle United	38	11	10	17	38	47	−9	43	
14	Manchester City	38	11	9	18	29	44	−15	42	

Source: Barclays Premier League
Rules for classification: 1) points; 2) goal difference; 3) number of goals scored.

=== League progress ===
This chart shows the league position of Middlesbrough F.C. over the course of the season. The green area represents the UEFA Champions League positions (positions 1 to 4), the yellow area represents what turned out to be the UEFA Cup positions (positions 5 to 7) and the red area represents the relegation places (positions 18 to 20). The lowest position in the league that Middlesbrough reached during the course of the season was 18th, prior to the home game versus Charlton Athletic on 23 December 2006 (an early kick-off result had knocked them down from 17th), and their highest placing was 9th, after the second game.

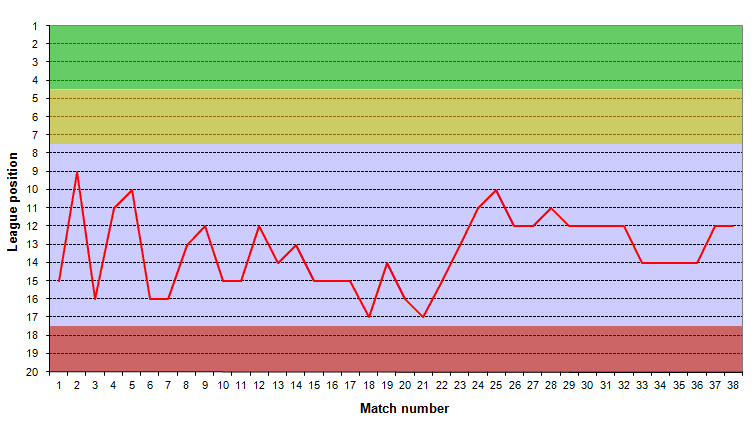

== League Cup ==
Boro suffered an embarrassing home defeat in the League Cup to Football League Two side Notts County in the second round, losing 0–1 with a weakened team - albeit one featuring debutant Robert Huth.

=== Results ===
Win Draw Loss

Note: Results are given with Middlesbrough score listed first. Man of the Match is according to mfc.co.uk.

Round	Date	Opponent	Venue	Result F–A	Attendance	Goalscorers
2	20 September 2006	Notts County	H	0–1	11,148

== FA Cup ==
Middlesbrough's FA Cup run was significantly longer than their League Cup run - partly due to them being taken to a replay in every round they played. They drew 1–1 at Hull in the FA Cup, with the replay resulting in an exciting 4–3 win. A 2–2 draw with Bristol City followed, setting up another replay. It was a nerve-wrecking 2–2 draw, with Boro winning 5–4 on penalties, presenting them with a tie at the Riverside with former player Tony Mowbray's West Brom. That game also ended 2–2, and the replay resulted in a Middlesbrough victory via penalties, after a 1–1 draw in normal time. Middlesbrough were eventually knocked out by champions-elect and eventual FA Cup runners-up Manchester United at Old Trafford in the quarter finals. The 2–2 result at the Riverside set up another replay, as Middlesbrough came from behind to lead 2–1, before George Boateng conceded a penalty for handball. Cristiano Ronaldo struck from the spot to force a replay, won by Manchester United 1–0 and ending Boro's run.

Due to every possible match going to a replay, Middlesbrough actually played more FA Cup games than Liverpool had in the competition the previous season, when they emerged as winners.

=== Results ===
Win Draw Loss

Note: Results are given with Middlesbrough score listed first. Man of the Match is according to mfc.co.uk.

Round	Date	Opponent	Venue	Result F–A	Attendance	Goalscorers
3	8 January 2007	Hull City	A	1–1	17,520	Viduka 73'
3R	16 January 2007	Hull City	H	4–3	16,702	Hines 32', Viduka (2) 49', 64', Yakubu 57' (pen.)
4	27 January 2007	Bristol City	A	2–2	19,008	Yakubu 4', Christie 23'
4R	13 February 2007	Bristol City	H	2–2 (5–4p)	26,328	Viduka 69', Yakubu 102'
5	17 February 2007	West Bromwich Albion	H	2–2	31,491	Arca 29', Yakubu 45+1' (pen.)
5R	27 February 2007	West Bromwich Albion	A	1–1 (5–4p)	24,925	Viduka 63'
6	10 March 2007	Manchester United	H	2–2	33,308	Cattermole 45', Boateng 47'
6R	19 March 2007	Manchester United	A	0–1	61,325

== Off the pitch ==
=== Staff changes ===
First team coach Steve Round left the club on 15 December 2006 following a "difference in philosophy and ideas" with Gareth Southgate, and was replaced by Colin Cooper. Chief European Scout Don Mackay left the team at the end of the year moving to Leicester City as part of their new management team.
