= Middlesbrough F.C. Under-21s and Academy =

Middlesbrough F.C. Under-21s
- Full name: Middlesbrough Football Club Under-21s
- Nickname: The Boro
- Short name: MFC, Boro
- Founded: 1876; 150 years ago
- Ground: Rockliffe Park, Hurworth
- Owner: Steve Gibson
- Chairman: Steve Gibson
- Manager: Craig Liddle
- League: Premier League 2, Division 2
- 2023–24: 11th
- Website: http://www.mfc.co.uk
Home colours	Away colours

Middlesbrough F.C. Reserves and Academy are the under-21 and under-18 teams of Middlesbrough F.C.

Most home fixtures are played at Rockliffe Park, near Hurworth, though some are played at Victoria Park, Hartlepool.

== Under 21s ==
Middlesbrough Reserves (also referred to as the Under-21 Development Squad) play in Division 2 of the Premier League 2, being part of the founding members of the Premier League 2 since 2012. They have also competed in the EFL Trophy during the 2016–17, 2017–18 and 2018–19 seasons alongside 15 other academies that held Category 1 status.

=== Current squad ===
As of 30 August 2026

Note: Flags indicate national team as defined under FIFA eligibility rules; some limited exceptions apply. Players may hold more than one non-FIFA nationality.

No.	Pos.	Nation	Player
—	GK	SCO	Shea Connor
—	GK	ENG	DJ Bernard
—	GK	ENG	Owen Foster
—	DF	ENG	George McCormick
—	DF	SCO	Josh Dede
—	DF	ENG	Harley Hunt
—	DF	ENG	Oliver Samuels
—	MF	ENG	Fin Cartwright
—	MF	POR	Eric Hamelberg

No.	Pos.	Nation	Player
—	MF	ENG	Daniel James
—	MF	ENG	Isaac Greenup
—	MF	ENG	Leon Parker
—	MF	ENG	Luke Woolston
—	FW	ENG	Rio Patterson-Powell
—	FW	ENG	Frankie Coulson
—	FW	DMA	Jayden Carbon
—	FW	ENG	Cruz Ibeh
—	FW	ENG	Layton Campbell

=== Out on loan ===
Note: Flags indicate national team as defined under FIFA eligibility rules; some limited exceptions apply. Players may hold more than one non-FIFA nationality.

No.	Pos.	Nation	Player
—	DF	ENG	Jack Daley (at Gillingham until 30 June 2027)

== Under 18s ==
Middlesbrough F.C. Under-18s
- Full name: Middlesbrough Football Club Under-18s
- Nickname: The Boro
- Short name: MFC, Boro
- Founded: 1876; 150 years ago
- Ground: Rockliffe Park, Hurworth
- Owner: Steve Gibson
- Chairman: Steve Gibson
- Manager: Craig Liddle
- League: U18 Premier League North
- 2020–21: 4th
- Website: http://www.mfc.co.uk
Home colours	Away colours

The Middlesbrough Academy is the name for Middlesbrough's youth system. They field teams in the U21 Premier League and U18 Premier League.

The longest serving academy manager was Dave Parnaby, who was appointed in 1998 and retired in 2017. During this time, the academy produced many notable players such as former first team captains Ben Gibson and Jonathan Woodgate; Australia internationals Brad Jones, Luke Wilkshire and Rhys Williams; Scotland internationals James Morrison, Graeme Murty and Robbie Stockdale; England internationals Stewart Downing and Adam Johnson; as well as Northern Ireland international Chris Brunt.

He also led the Academy side to the 2003 FA Youth Cup final against Manchester United where they finished runners up, before getting to the final again the next season and emerging victorious over Aston Villa in 2004.

=== Current squad ===
As of 8 December 2024

Note: Flags indicate national team as defined under FIFA eligibility rules; some limited exceptions apply. Players may hold more than one non-FIFA nationality.

No.	Pos.	Nation	Player
—	GK	ENG	Joseph Richardson
45	GK	WAL	Oliver Lloyd
—	DF	ENG	Logan Edmundson
—	DF	ENG	Oliver Martin
—	DF	ENG	Will McPartland
—	DF	ENG	Tyler Smith
—	DF	ENG	Logan Williams

No.	Pos.	Nation	Player
42	DF	ENG	James Wilson
—	DF	ENG	McCartney Woodhouse
—	DF	ENG	Ike Givenson
—	DF	ENG	Ellis Moss
48	MF	ENG	Isaac Greenup
—	MF	ENG	Lucas Harrison
—	MF	ENG	Joe Roberts
—	FW	ENG	William Okine
44	FW	ENG	Cruz Ibeh

== Staff ==
The Middlesbrough football club academy staff are as follows:

=== Senior Staff ===
Position	Staff
Academy Manager	Craig Liddle
Head Goalkeeping Coach	Chris Pennock
Head Sports Scientist	Alistair Hamilton
Head of Recruitment	Martin Carter
Head of Education and Welfare	Barry Dawson

=== Medical ===
Role	Name
Head Of Medical	David Minihane
Physiotherapist	Liam Chapman
Physiotherapist	Jason McNamee

=== Fitness and Performance ===
Name	Role
Head of Fitness and Sports Science	Mike Lawson
Sport Scientist	Robbie Dawson
Strength and Conditioning Coach	Hermes Pellotta
Performance Analyst	Alex Telford

=== Scouting ===
Name	Role
Head of Recruitment	Martin Carter
Assistant Head of Recruitment	
Scout, Academy Recruitment	

=== Coaching staff ===
Because of Middlesbrough Football Clubs Academies EPP level they divide their coaching into three phases. Professional development, youth development and foundation phases of coaching.

Name	Role		
Professional Development Lead Coach (U23)	Lee Cattermole	Professional Development Assistant Coach (U23)	Paul Crager
Professional Development Coach (U18)	Mark Tinkler	Professional Development Assistant Coach (U18)	James Marwood
Professional Development Goalkeeping Coach	Chris Pennock		
Youth Development Lead Coach	Aaron Croft		
Youth Development Coach	Rob Jones		
Youth Development Assistant Coach	Micky Cummins		
Foundation Development Lead Coach	Dean Grayson		

== Notable products ==
Many players have come through Middlesbrough's academy who have either gone on to play for the first team or have gone on to have successful careers elsewhere. The following are players who have made professional appearances, either for Middlesbrough or another football club, during their careers.

They are organised in order of the date they signed their first professional contract with Middlesbrough (from 1997 onwards). Appearances for those who played for Middlesbrough are counted as all professional appearances for the club in all competitions. Players who are still contracted to the club (including players loaned out elsewhere) are highlighted in bold.

=== Players who have played for Middlesbrough ===
As of 16 October 2020

Year	Player	Position	Apps
1997	(Scotland) Sean Kilgannon	Central Midfielder	1
1997	(Scotland) Chris Bennion	Goalkeeper	1
1997	(England) Mark Hudson	Central Midfielder	6
1998	(England) Stuart Parnaby	Right back	127
1998	(Australia) Brad Jones	Goalkeeper	74
1998	(Australia) Luke Wilkshire	Right back	25
1998	(Argentina) Carlos Marinelli	Attacking midfielder	46
1998	(Northern Ireland) Brian Close	Right back	1
1999	(England) Craig Dove	Left midfielder	2
2000	(England) Stewart Downing	Left midfielder	404
2000	(England) David Murphy	Left back	16
2000	(England) Jamie Cade	Striker	1
2001	(England) Andrew Davies	Centre back	71
2001	(England) Ross Turnbull	Goalkeeper	29
2002	(England) Andrew Taylor	Left back	145
2002	(England) Tony McMahon	Right back	137
2002	(England) Danny Graham	Striker	39
2002	(Scotland) James Morrison	Attacking midfielder	98
2003	(England) Jason Kennedy	Central Midfielder	7
2003	(England) Matthew Bates	Centre back	126
2003	(England) Tom Craddock	Striker	5
2003	(England) David Wheater	Centre back	157
2003	(England) Adam Johnson	Right midfielder	120
2004	(England) Graeme Owens	Right midfielder	1
2004	(England) Jonathan Grounds	Left back	37
2004	(England) Lee Cattermole	Defensive midfielder	91
2004	(England) Seb Hines	Centre back	87
2004	(Australia) Rhys Williams	Defensive midfielder	141
2004	(England) Ben Hutchinson	Striker	9
2005	(England) Josh Walker	Central Midfielder	13
2005	(England) John Johnson	Centre back	1
2006	(England) Jonathan Franks	Right winger	30
2006	(England) Joe Bennett	Left back	92
2006	(England) Jason Steele	Goalkeeper	142
2007	(England) Richard Smallwood	Defensive midfielder	72
2008	(Scotland) Cameron Park	Left midfielder	5
2009	(England) Luke Williams	Striker	42
2009	(England) Connor Ripley	Goalkeeper	3
2009	(England) Ben Gibson	Centre back	203
2009	(England) Adam Reach	Attacking midfielder	78
2011	(Northern Ireland) Jordan Jones	Left midfielder	1
2012	(England) Bryn Morris	Defensive midfielder	3
2012	(England) Bradley Fewster	Striker	2
2013	(England) **Dael Fry**	Centre back	107
2014	(England) Nathan McGinley	Centre back	1
2014	(England) Harry Chapman	Left midfielder	4
2015	(England) Ben Liddle	Central Midfielder	2
2015	(England) **Hayden Coulson**	Left back	32
2016	(England) Aynsley Pears	Goalkeeper	25
2016	(England) **Marcus Tavernier**	Left midfielder	81
2016	(England) **Stephen Walker**	Striker	10
2017	(England) **Tyrone O'Neill**	Striker	1
2017	(France) Billal Brahimi	Left winger	1
2018	(England) **Nathan Wood**	Centre back	7

=== Players who have played for other football clubs ===
As of 30 January 2020

Year	Player	Position
1998	(England) Christian Hanson	Centre back
1998	(Brazil) Arthuro	Striker
1998	(England) Aron Wilford	Striker
1998	(Republic of Ireland) Ger Robinson	Striker
1999	(England) Sam Russell	Goalkeeper
1999	(England) Phil Gulliver	Centre back
1999	(Republic of Ireland) Keith Gilroy	Central Midfielder
1999	(England) Stephen Brackstone	Central Midfielder
2000	(England) Gary Smith	Central Midfielder
2000	(England) Andrew Kelly	Centre back
2000	(United States) Sergio van Kanten	Central Midfielder
2001	(Northern Ireland) Chris Brunt	Central Midfielder
2002	(England) Gary Liddle	Centre back
2002	(England) Anthony Peacock	Central Midfielder
2002	(Belgium) Michaël Van Geele	Central Midfielder
2003	(England) David Knight	Goalkeeper
2003	(England) Dale Roberts	Goalkeeper
2003	(England) Nathan Mulligan	Central Midfielder
2004	(England) Kevin Burgess	Centre back
2004	(France) Hérold Goulon	Defensive midfielder
2005	(England) Stephen Thompson	Striker
2005	(England) Nathan Fisher	Striker
2005	(England) Daryl Robson	Central Midfielder
2006	(England) Nathan Porritt	Central Midfielder
2006	(Canada) Shaun Saiko	Attacking midfielder
2007	(England) Jordan Robinson	Centre back
2007	(England) Gary Martin	Striker
2007	(England) Ashley Corker	Left back
2008	(Netherlands) Patrick Otte	Left midfielder
2008	(Northern Ireland) James Gray	Striker
2009	(England) Charlie Wyke	Striker
2009	(England) Adam Smith	Goalkeeper
2009	(Northern Ireland) Ryan Brobbel	Left midfielder
2009	(England) Matthew Dolan	Central Midfielder
2010	(England) Wilson Kneeshaw	Striker
2010	(England) Jarrett Rivers	Right midfielder
2010	(England) Curtis Edwards	Right midfielder
2010	(England) Adam Jackson	Centre back
2011	(England) Zak Boagey	Striker
2011	(Gibraltar) Anthony Hernandez	Striker
2012	(England) Mark Kitching	Centre back
2012	(England) **Joe Fryer**	Goalkeeper
2012	(England) David Atkinson	Centre back
2013	(England) Jonny Burn	Centre back
2013	(England) Callum Cooke	Attacking midfielder
2014	(England) Luke Coddington	Goalkeeper
2014	(England) Callum Johnson	Right back
2014	(England) Junior Mondal	Left midfielder
2016	(England) Alex Pattison	Central Midfielder
2016	(England) Luke Armstrong	Striker

=== Players who have played at international level ===
Many players who have come through the youth ranks at Middlesbrough have appeared for their national team at both senior and youth levels. The following is a list of those players organised by national team and alphabetical order respectively.

As of 21 October 2019

Team	Player(s)
(United Kingdom) 2012 GB Olympic Team	Jason Steele
England U-16s	Jamie Cade, Lee Cattermole, Callum Cooke, Hayden Coulson, Stewart Downing, Bradley Fewster, Jonathan Franks, Seb Hines, Adam Jackson, David Knight, Tony McMahon, Bryn Morris, David Murphy, Stuart Parnaby, Jason Steele, Andrew Taylor, Ross Turnbull, David Wheater, Nathan Wood
England U-17s	Lee Cattermole, Callum Cooke, Hayden Coulson, Matthew Elsdon, Bradley Fewster, Jonathan Franks, Dael Fry, Ben Gibson, Seb Hines, Adam Jackson, David Knight, Tony McMahon, Bryn Morris, James Morrison, Nathan Porritt, Jason Steele, Andrew Taylor, Ross Turnbull, Stephen Walker, David Wheater, Luke Williams, Nathan Wood
England U-18s	Matthew Bates, Stephen Brackstone, Lee Cattermole, Harry Chapman, Callum Cooke, Hayden Coulson, Stewart Downing, Bradley Fewster, Jonathan Franks, Dael Fry, Ben Gibson, Adam Jackson, David Knight, Bryn Morris, James Morrison, Stuart Parnaby, Richard Smallwood, Andrew Taylor, Ross Turnbull, Stephen Walker, David Wheater
England U-19s	Matthew Bates, Joe Bennett, Lee Cattermole, Stewart Downing, Bradley Fewster, Jonathan Franks, Dael Fry, Seb Hines, Adam Jackson, Adam Johnson, David Knight, Tony McMahon, Bryn Morris, James Morrison, Adam Reach, Connor Ripley, Jason Steele, Marcus Tavernier, Andrew Taylor, Ross Turnbull, Stephen Walker, David Wheater, Luke Williams
England U-20s	Joe Bennett, Harry Chapman, Jonathan Franks, Dael Fry, Ben Gibson, Danny Graham, Bryn Morris, James Morrison, Stuart Parnaby, Adam Reach, Connor Ripley, Marcus Tavernier, Andrew Taylor, Josh Walker, Luke Williams
England U-21s	Joe Bennett, Lee Cattermole, Andrew Davies, Stewart Downing, Dael Fry, Ben Gibson, Adam Johnson, Stuart Parnaby, Jason Steele, Andrew Taylor, David Wheater
England C Team	Dale Roberts
England B Team	Stewart Downing
(England) Senior Team	Stewart Downing, Adam Johnson
Wales U-21s	Rhys Williams
Scotland U-16s	Lucas Reed, William Wandji
Scotland U-19s	Cameron Park
Scotland U-21s	Cameron Park
Scotland Senior Team	James Morrison, Graeme Murty, Robbie Stockdale
Northern Ireland U-16s	James Gray
Northern Ireland U-17s	Ryan Brobbel, James Gray
Northern Ireland U-18s	Ryan Brobbel
Northern Ireland U-19s	Ryan Brobbel, Chris Brunt, James Gray, Jordan Jones
Northern Ireland U-21s	Ryan Brobbel, Chris Brunt, Brian Close, James Gray
Northern Ireland U-23s	Chris Brunt, Brian Close
Northern Ireland Senior Team	Chris Brunt, Jordan Jones
Gibraltar U-19s	Anthony Hernandez
Gibraltar	Anthony Hernandez
(Republic of Ireland) Ireland U-16s	Keith Gilroy
(Republic of Ireland) Ireland U-17s	Ger Robinson
(Republic of Ireland) Ireland U-21s	Keith Gilroy
Australia U-20s	Brad Jones, Luke Wilkshire
Australia U-23s	Brad Jones, Luke Wilkshire
Australia Senior Team	Brad Jones, Luke Wilkshire, Rhys Williams
Canada U-20s	Shaun Saiko
Canada U-23s	Shaun Saiko
France U-19s	Billal Brahimi
France U-21s	Hérold Goulon
Argentina U-17s	Carlos Marinelli
Argentina U-20s	Carlos Marinelli

== Honours ==
- FA Youth Cup

Winners (1): 2003–04
Runners-up (2): 1989–90, 2002–03

- Professional U18 Development League

Winners (1): 2014–15

- North Riding Senior Cup

Winners (11): 1996–97, 2000–01, 2001–02, 2003–04, 2006–07, 2007–08, 2008–09, 2011–12, 2014–15, 2015–16, 2017–18
Runners-up (1): 2003–04, 2004–05, 2013–14

- The Central League

Winners (1): 2011–12
Runners-up (2): 1995–96, 2010–11

- Central League Cup

Winners (1): 2014–15
