= Lee Cattermole =

English footballer

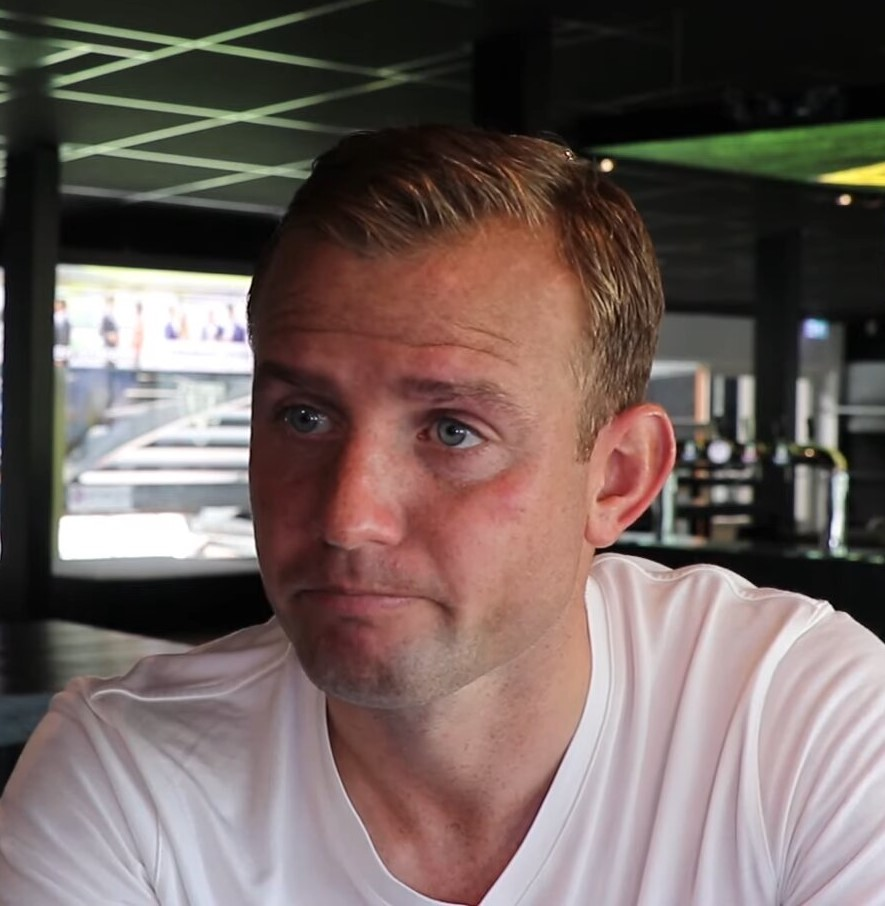
- Cattermole in 2019

Personal information
- Full name: Lee Barry Cattermole
- Date of birth: 21 March 1988 (age 38)
- Place of birth: Stockton-on-Tees, England
- Height: 5 ft 10 in (1.78 m)
- Position: Defensive midfielder

Youth career
- 1998–2005: Middlesbrough

Senior career*
Years	Team	Apps	(Gls)
2005–2008	Middlesbrough	69	(3)
2008–2009	Wigan Athletic	33	(1)
2009–2019	Sunderland	233	(10)
2019–2020	VVV-Venlo	11	(1)
Total		346	(14)

International career
2003	England U16	1	(0)
2004	England U17	4	(0)
2005	England U18	1	(0)
2006	England U19	1	(0)
2007–2010	England U21	16	(3)

Managerial career
- 2026: Gateshead
- * Club domestic league appearances and goals

Lee Barry Cattermole (born 21 March 1988) is an English former professional footballer who played as a central midfielder. He was most recently manager of National League club Gateshead.

An England youth product, Cattermole has earned a reputation as a tough-tackling midfielder due to his lengthy disciplinary record. He began his professional career at Middlesbrough in 2005, having progressed through the club's academy. After making his debut for the club in January 2006, he became a regular player, and at the age of 18 years and 47 days was the youngest man to captain Middlesbrough where he made 91 appearances and scored four goals. He switched to Wigan Athletic in July 2008. Cattermole quickly became a regular for Wigan, amassing 35 appearances in the 2008–09 season. After attracting interest from other Premier League clubs, he joined Sunderland in August 2009. Despite a few injury problems early in his spell at the club, manager Steve Bruce selected him as captain for the start of the 2010–11 season, a role he would hold for three seasons, until Paolo di Canio gave John O'Shea the role prior to the start of the 2013–14 season.

Internationally, Cattermole represented England at under-16, under-17, under-18, under-19 and under-21 levels.

== Club career ==
=== Middlesbrough ===
A product of the Middlesbrough youth academy, Cattermole made his debut in the Tyne-Tees derby against Newcastle United on 2 January 2006, playing the full 90 minutes in a match that finished 2–2 in which the England youth international received the Man of the Match award. Manager Steve McClaren later hailed his performance stating, "When we needed people to stand up and be counted, it took a 17-year-old to bring everyone together."

After a 4–0 home defeat to Aston Villa, he was captured on camera in tears and had to be consoled by captain Gareth Southgate. However, after this game the team went on to win seven out of their next eight games, advancing to the quarter-finals of both the FA and UEFA cups and defeating Premier League champions Chelsea 3–0, only their second league defeat of the season. Cattermole scored his first league goal for Middlesbrough on 2 April, in a 1–0 victory away at Manchester City, and played for Middlesbrough in the 2006 UEFA Cup Final.

Cattermole became Middlesbrough's youngest-ever captain aged 18 years and 47 days when he skippered the side in their 1–0 defeat away against Fulham on 7 May 2006. During the game, Middlesbrough's oldest-ever player, Colin Cooper, came on as a substitute and Cattermole sportingly gave the captain's armband, without instruction, to Cooper who was playing his last game before retirement.

On 20 October 2006, Cattermole signed a new four-year deal to keep him at Middlesbrough until 2010.

=== Wigan Athletic ===
On 29 July 2008, Cattermole signed for Wigan Athletic on a three-year deal in a transfer worth £3.5 million. He made his debut against West Ham United in a 2–1 defeat. Cattermole scored his first goal for Wigan in a 4–1 League Cup win over Ipswich Town on 24 September 2008. He then scored his first league goal in a 3–0 home win over Blackburn Rovers on 13 December 2008. On 4 March, he was given a straight red card, his second of the season, for a reckless challenge on Scott Parker in the home defeat by West Ham. Despite being tied to a three-year deal, Cattermole's impressive season with Wigan resulted in him being a target for other clubs.

=== Sunderland ===
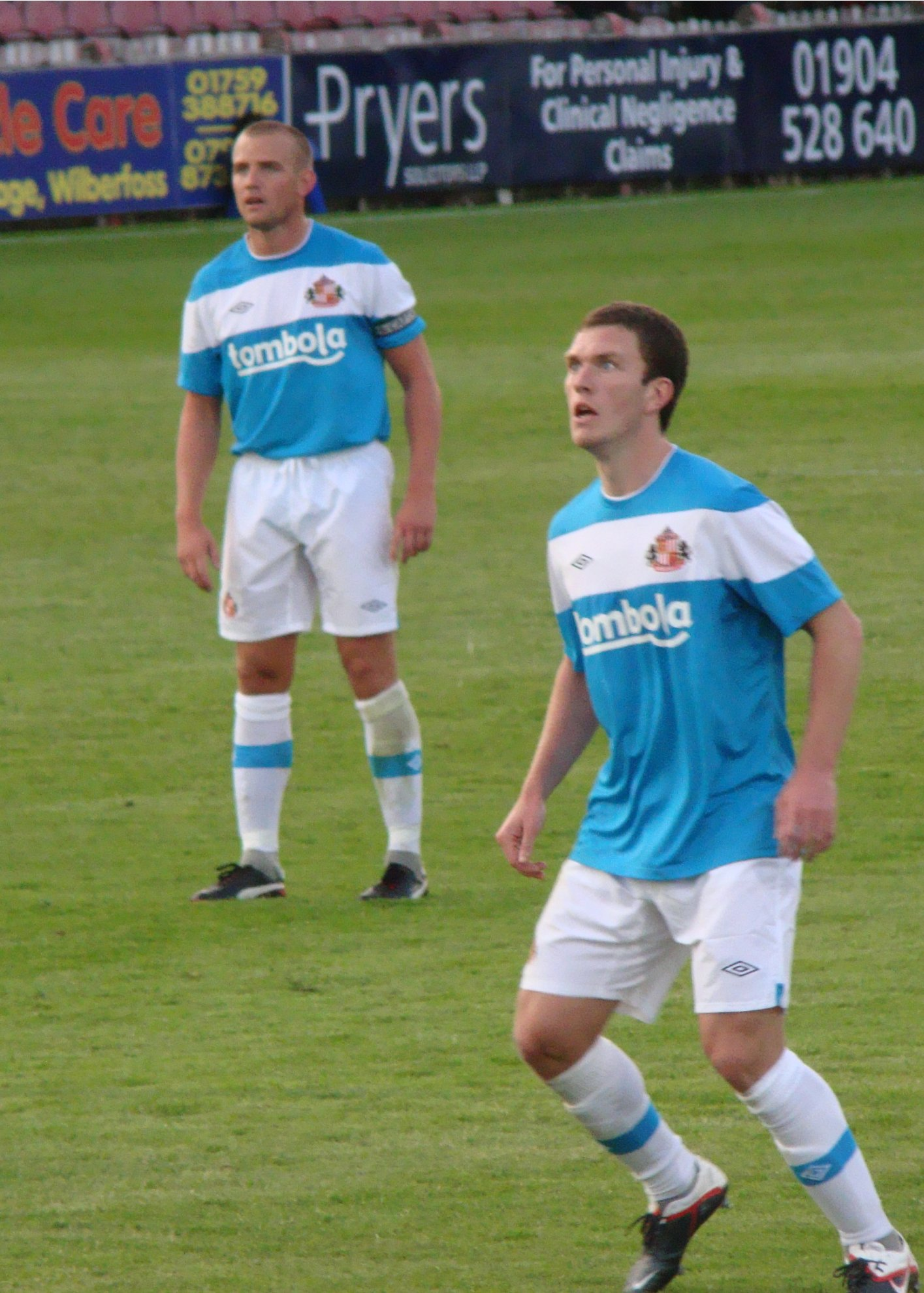
Cattermole (left) playing for Sunderland in 2011 alongside Craig Gardner (right)

On 12 August 2009, it was announced that Cattermole had completed a medical at Sunderland and signed for a fee of £6 million. The midfielder joined the club on a four-year contract, reuniting with former Wigan coach Steve Bruce. He made his debut in a 1–0 win over Bolton Wanderers, in which he won Sunderland's Man of the Match award. He then in the next few games of the season became popular amongst the fans despite missing several games with a heel injury. On 17 October 2009, he injured his knee in the win over Liverpool and was ruled out for twelve weeks. He returned as a second-half substitute for Jordan Henderson on 15 December in a 2–0 loss against Aston Villa. He then played the full match and captained the side in the 4–3 defeat by Manchester City.

On the eve of the 2010–11 season, Cattermole was selected by manager Bruce as the replacement captain after Lorik Cana's departure. He was also handed the vacant number 6 shirt. He received a red card in the first game of the season against Birmingham City for a second bookable offence. Bruce later referred to referee Anthony Taylor as 'out of his depth'. Cattermole played most of the 90 minutes in Sunderland's 3–0 away win against Chelsea, coming off in added time in the second half and was pivotal in the victory. He then earned the Man of the Match award for his performance at home to West Ham, a game which Sunderland won 1–0. Cattermole's tough tackling style has put him into troublesome situations with referees. Bruce, despite backing Cattermole as club captain, said that his disciplinary record must improve. Again, Cattermole suffered an injury-hit season, making 24 appearances in total (two more than the previous season).

Cattermole remained captain at the start of the 2011–12 season and received yellow cards in the first two games, against Liverpool and Newcastle. He then fell out of favour, with his next full match not coming until 5 November, in a defeat at Manchester United. Following Bruce's sacking and the appointment of Martin O'Neill as his successor, it was suggested Cattermole might lose the captaincy, especially after he and Nicklas Bendtner were arrested for allegedly damaging cars in Newcastle city centre. However, he led the team on his first appearance under O'Neill, a 3–2 win at QPR. Cattermole had arguably two of his best performances for the Black Cats in their 1–0 win over Manchester City on New Years Day 2012 and a 4–1 win at Wigan two days later. After the victory over Manchester City, O'Neill told his captain: "Well done, absolutely brilliant. You've got a heart like a lion". The skipper also put in another excellent defensive performance in the FA Cup fifth-round game against Arsenal on 18 February. Cattermole and his teammates constantly pressed the Arsenal players when they had possession, forcing mistakes and with counter-attacking football, the Black Cats won 2–0.

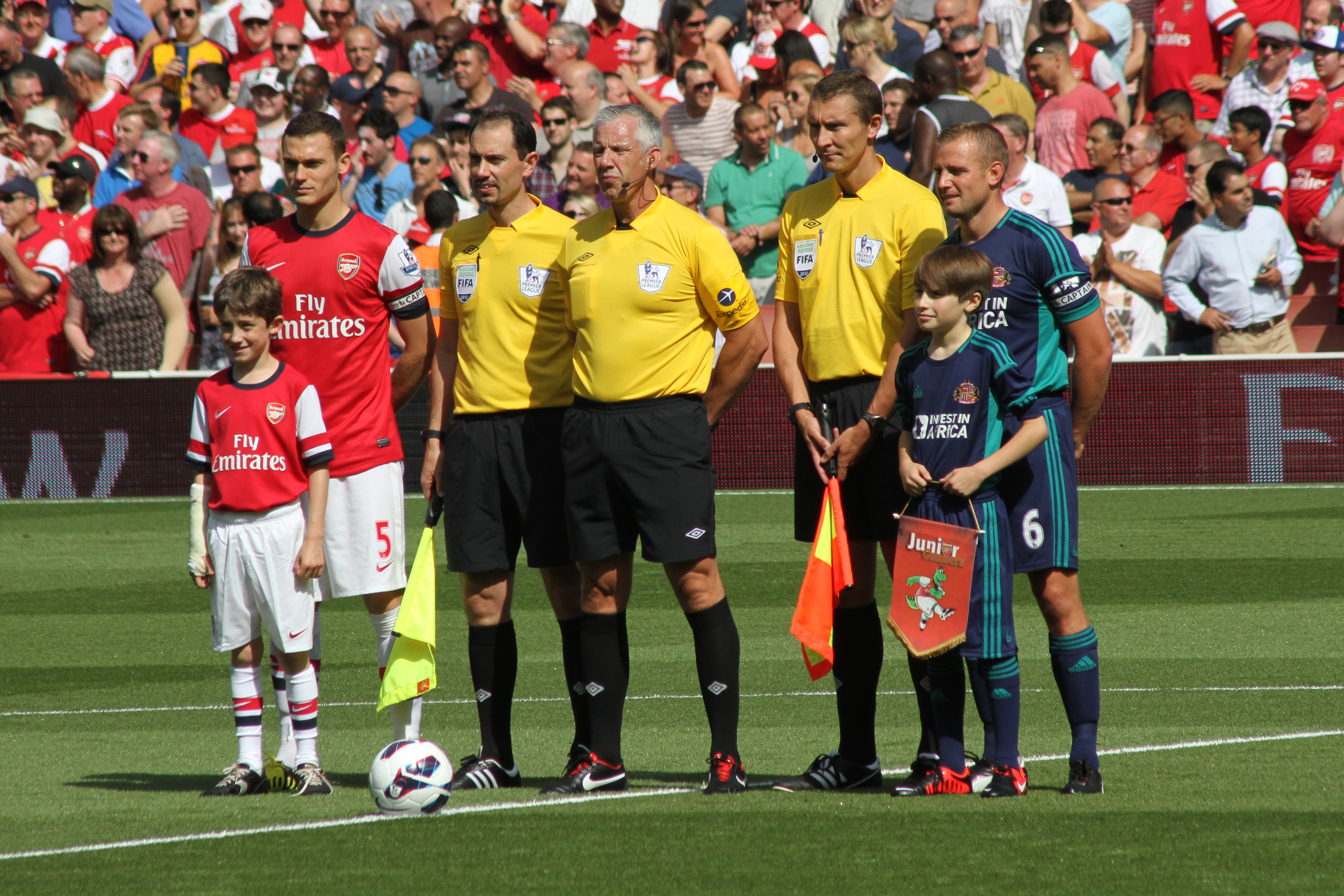
Cattermole (right) posing for a pre-match photo before facing Arsenal in August 2012

On 4 March 2012, Cattermole was booked in the first minute of the Tyne-Wear derby for a challenge on Newcastle's Cheick Tioté. He received a red card at the conclusion of the match after confronting referee Mike Dean. Martin O'Neill described Cattermole's sending off as "foolish" but claimed Newcastle were "lucky" to finish with 11 players. Cattermole received a four-match ban for the incident. During his ban, reports suggested Cattermole could be stripped of the captaincy because of his behaviour at the Tyne-Wear Derby match but O'Neill denied the claims. After serving his ban, Cattermole made his return for Sunderland on 27 March in the FA Cup quarter-final replay against Everton, a match Sunderland went on to lose 2–0. Through 73 games for Sunderland in all competitions, Cattermole had been booked 32 times and received four red cards.

The start of the 2013–14 season saw Cattermole replaced as captain by John O'Shea and his number 6 shirt handed to new signing Cabral. Cattermole was assigned the number 33 jersey. He scored his first league goal for Sunderland in a 5–1 loss to Tottenham Hotspur at White Hart Lane on 7 April 2014.

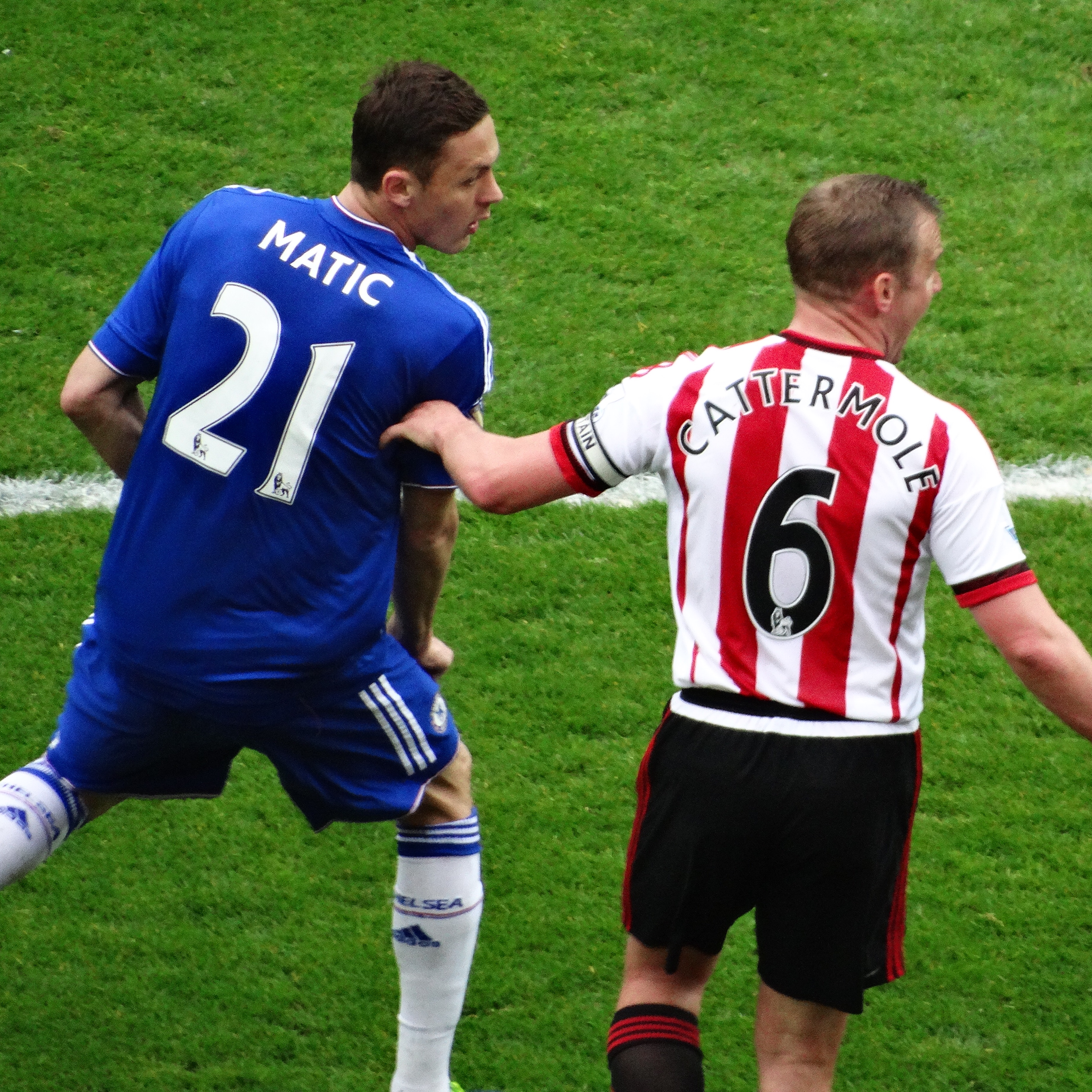
Cattermole captaining Sunderland against Chelsea in May 2016

Cattermole regained his number 6 shirt at the start of the 2014–15 season, and scored Sunderland's first goal of the season, with a 25-yard screamer which he described as being 'the best goal he has ever scored', in a 2–2 draw away to West Brom. On 2 July 2015, Cattermole signed a five-year contract extension with Sunderland, committing his future to the club until 2021.

On the opening day of the 2015–16 season, Cattermole captained Sunderland against Leicester City at the King Power Stadium, but was substituted by Dick Advocaat after 30 minutes, with his side 3–0 down and Cattermole having conceded a penalty. Sunderland would go on to lose 4–2.

After missing most of the 2016–17 season through injury, Cattermole returned to the first team late in the campaign and earned praise from Sunderland fans for his performance against Arsenal at the Emirates Stadium on 16 May 2017 as the Black Cats were defeated 2–0 thanks to a brace from Alexis Sánchez. Cattermole suffered relegation with Sunderland as the club finished bottom of the table on just 24 points, ending their ten-year stint in the top flight.

On 31 March 2019, during the EFL Trophy final against Portsmouth, Cattermole's penalty was saved by Craig MacGillivray in a 5–4 loss on penalties for Sunderland following a 2–2 draw after extra time. On 1 July 2019, it was announced that Cattermole would leave Sunderland after having spent 10 years at the club. Cattermole explained in the announcement that "it is the right time to find a new challenge". He subsequently had a trial with Eredivisie side VVV-Venlo in August.

=== VVV-Venlo ===
On 22 August 2019, Cattermole relocated to Dutch football, signing a year-long contract with Eredivisie side VVV-Venlo, joining them on a free transfer.

Cattermole was released on 27 May 2020, shortly after the season was abandoned as a result of the COVID-19 pandemic, with him leaving on the grounds that his contract had expired and the club opted not to renew it.

== International career ==
Cattermole received his first call-up to the England under-21 squad for the October 2006 play-offs against Germany. Cattermole scored his first international goal and the first goal of the U-21 European Championships on 15 June 2009 against Finland. The goal was set up by Aston Villa striker Gabriel Agbonlahor. Cattermole went on to score his third in an England shirt when they came from behind to defeat Macedonia U21s in a 2–1 win with a goal in the 83rd minute sealing the victory after an impressive goal from Freddie Sears.

== Coaching career ==
On 20 January 2022, Cattermole returned to his former club Middlesbrough as under-18s lead coach. On 10 February 2023, it was announced that he would be departing his role at the end of the month.

On 12 December 2024, Cattermole joined League One side Bristol Rovers as first-team coach with a focus on the development and implementation of set-pieces. Just four days after joining, on 16 December, he became caretaker manager alongside David Horseman following the sacking of Matt Taylor. Before the first match of his caretaker reign however, it was reported that Cattermole had left the club, which was officially confirmed following the appointment of Iñigo Calderón on 26 December.

On 16 June 2026, Cattermole was appointed manager of National League club Gateshead on a two-year contract. He was dismissed on 4 October 2026 following 1 win in the opening 14 games, leaving Gateshead bottom of the league.

== Personal life ==
In December 2008, Cattermole was given a three-year pub ban across the borough of Stockton. He was added to the PubWatch blacklist of troublemakers after being arrested for disorder during a night out in Yarm. Police were called by door staff at about 11:40 pm and Cattermole was subsequently arrested. In March 2011, it was announced that Cattermole's ban would be extended to December 2012 after a unanimous vote by the members of PubWatch. Cattermole declined to comment on these matters.

Following a night out with teammates, Cattermole was arrested on 6 December 2011 along with then teammate Nicklas Bendtner and charged with damaging five cars on Stowell Street in Newcastle, close to St James' Park. On 25 March 2012, the case at Newcastle Magistrates Court was adjourned to be brought back before the same court on 16 April 2012. Charges against Bendtner were subsequently dropped. Cattermole accepted a conditional caution and paid over £4,000 in damages.

== Career statistics ==
Appearances and goals by club, season and competition
Club	Season	League			FA Cup		League Cup		Other		Total	
Club	Season	Division	Apps	Goals	Apps	Goals	Apps	Goals	Apps	Goals	Apps	Goals
Middlesbrough	2005–06	Premier League	14	1	5	0	0	0	5 (Note: Appearances in UEFA Cup)	0	24	1
Middlesbrough	2006–07	Premier League	31	1	7	1	1	0	—		39	2
Middlesbrough	2007–08	Premier League	24	1	2	0	2	0	—		28	1
Middlesbrough	Total		69	3	14	1	3	0	5	0	91	4
Wigan Athletic	2008–09	Premier League	33	1	0	0	2	1	—		35	2
Sunderland	2009–10	Premier League	22	0	0	0	0	0	—		22	0
Sunderland	2010–11	Premier League	23	0	0	0	1	0	—		24	0
Sunderland	2011–12	Premier League	23	0	3	0	1	0	—		27	0
Sunderland	2012–13	Premier League	10	0	1	0	3	0	—		14	0
Sunderland	2013–14	Premier League	24	1	3	0	5	0	—		32	1
Sunderland	2014–15	Premier League	28	1	0	0	0	0	—		28	1
Sunderland	2015–16	Premier League	31	0	1	0	2	0	—		34	0
Sunderland	2016–17	Premier League	8	0	0	0	1	0	—		9	0
Sunderland	2017–18	Championship	35	1	0	0	0	0	—		35	1
Sunderland	2018–19	League One	29	7	1	0	1	0	2 (Note: Appearances in EFL Trophy)	0	33	7
Sunderland	Total		233	10	9	0	14	0	2	0	258	10
VVV-Venlo	2019–20	Eredivisie	11	0	0	0	—		—		11	0
Career total			346	14	23	1	19	1	7	0	395	16

== Managerial statistics ==
As of match played 3 October 2026

Managerial record by team and tenure
Team	From	To	Record				
Team	From	To	P	W	D	L	Win %
Gateshead	16 June 2026	4 October 2026	14	1	2	11	7.1
Total			14	1	2	11	7.1

== Honours ==
Middlesbrough

- UEFA Cup runner-up: 2005–06

Sunderland

- Football League Cup runner-up: 2013–14
- EFL Trophy runner-up: 2018–19

England U21

- UEFA European Under-21 Championship runner-up: 2009

Individual

- North East Football Writers' Association's Player of the Year: 2014
