= David Knight (English footballer) =

English association football player

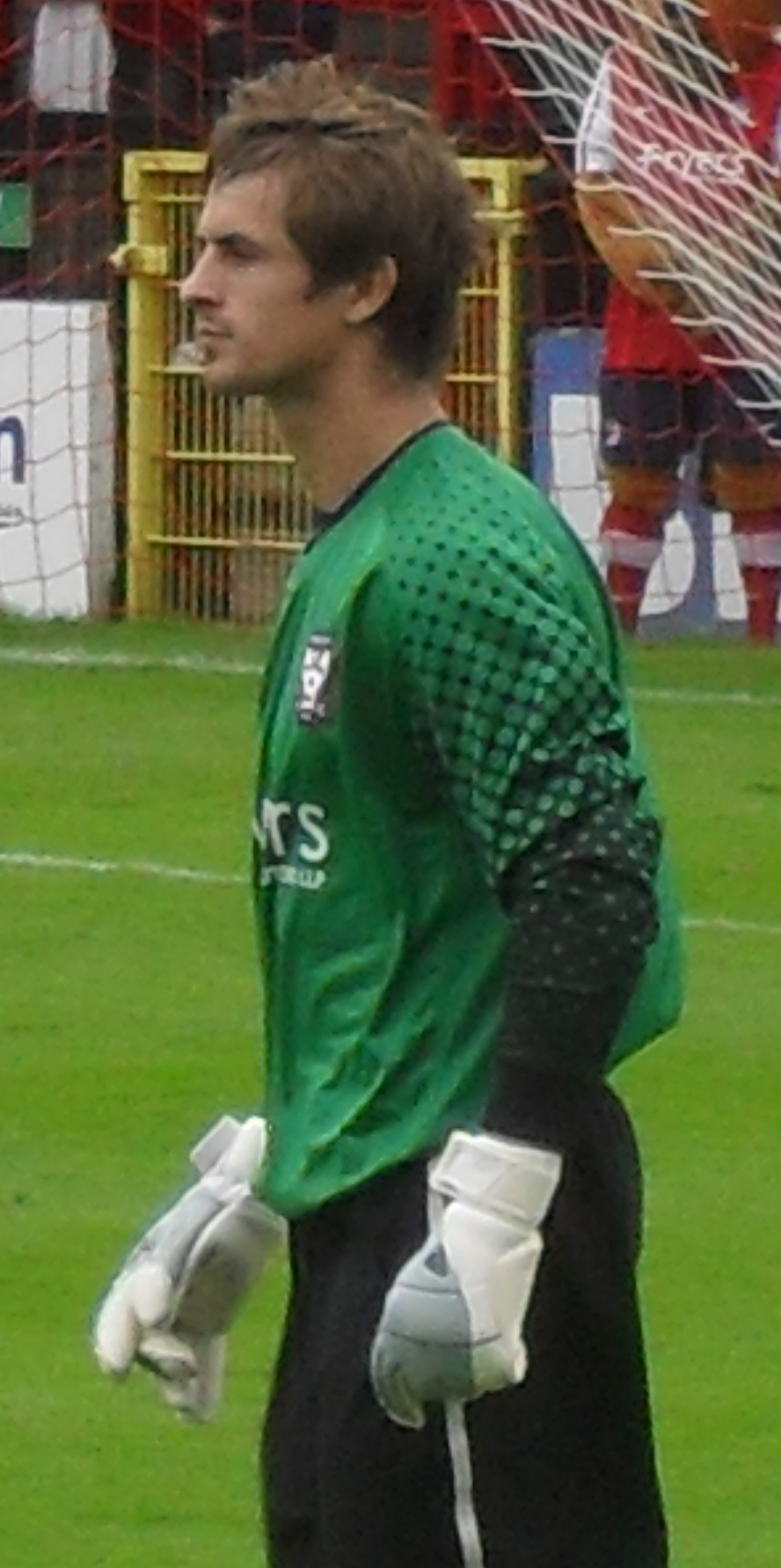
- Knight playing for York City in 2010

Personal information
- Full name: David Sean Knight
- Date of birth: 15 January 1987 (age 39)
- Place of birth: Houghton-le-Spring, England
- Height: 6 ft 0 in (1.83 m)
- Position: Goalkeeper

Youth career
- 1998–2005: Middlesbrough

Senior career*
| Years | Team | Apps | (Gls) |
| 2005–2007 | Middlesbrough | 0 | (0) |
| 2005–2006 | → Darlington (loan) | 3 | (0) |
| 2006 | → Oldham Athletic (loan) | 2 | (0) |
| 2007–2008 | Swansea City | 0 | (0) |
| 2008 | Mansfield Town | 0 | (0) |
| 2008–2009 | Middlesbrough | 0 | (0) |
| 2009 | Darlington | 7 | (0) |
| 2010–2011 | Histon | 12 | (0) |
| 2010–2011 | → York City (loan) | 1 | (0) |
| 2011 | → Blyth Spartans (loan) | ? | (?) |
| 2011–2012 | Blyth Spartans | ? | (?) |
| 2012–2014 | Spennymoor Town | ? | (?) |

International career
| 2002 | England U16 | 3 | (0) |
| | England U17 | ? | (?) |
| | England U18 | ? | (?) |
| | England U19 | ? | (?) |
- * Club domestic league appearances and goals as of 23:00, 1 July 2013 (UTC)

David Sean Knight (born 15 January 1987) is an English footballer who last played for Spennymoor Town as a goalkeeper.

== Club career ==
Born in Houghton-le-Spring, Tyne and Wear, Knight began his career with the Middlesbrough youth system at the age of 11 after he was spotted by a scout playing for his local team Hetton Juniors. He played in both legs of the 2004 FA Youth Cup Final, which Middlesbrough won 4–0 on aggregate. Knight signed a professional contract with Middlesbrough on 3 February 2005 and his first involvement with the first team came weeks later after being named on the substitutes' bench for a 2–2 draw with Charlton Athletic in the FA Premier League on 27 February. Knight joined League Two team Darlington on an emergency one-month loan on 30 December 2005 to cover injuries to Sam Russell and Bertrand Bossu and he made his debut the following day in a 2–2 draw against Lincoln City. After he picked up a hip injury during a 3–2 defeat to Notts County he finished the loan with three appearances. He signed a new one-year contract with Middlesbrough in June 2006. Knight signed for League One team Oldham Athletic on a one-month loan on 24 August. His debut lasted only 39 minutes after he was "wrongly" sent off for handling the ball outside the box, with the game finishing a 0–0 draw with Carlisle United. He made one more appearance for Oldham before suffering from swollen glands and a hip injury before finishing the loan with two appearances.

He left Middlesbrough to join League One team Swansea City on a free transfer on 31 August 2007. His first and only appearance of the 2007–08 season came in a 2–1 victory over Billericay Town in the FA Cup first round on 10 November 2007. He was released by the club after his contract expired on 30 June 2008 and he signed for Conference Premier team Mansfield Town on 13 October following a trial. Having made no appearances he left Mansfield on 3 November and returned to Middlesbrough to play in the reserves on a month-to-month contract. Knight left the club for the second time in May 2009 after failing to earn a long-term contract. He agreed on 2 July to re-sign for Darlington on a one-year contract once the League Two club had left administration. His 2009–10 season started with a "flurry of errors" and his second debut for the club came in a 3–1 defeat at Aldershot Town on 8 August 2009. Knight left Darlington on 8 December when manager Steve Staunton released him from his contract by mutual consent, having played nine games for the club.

Knight moved to Conference Premier side Histon in February 2010 on a one-and-a-half-year contract following a two-week trial. He made his debut in a 1–0 defeat to Rushden & Diamonds on 3 March 2010 and he finished the 2009–10 season with 12 appearances for Histon. Despite being told he had a future with Histon, Knight joined York City on a two-week trial in July with a view to signing on a season-long loan. Illness resulted in him missing York's pre-season friendly with Hull City although he later played one half of York's 2–0 defeat to Barnsley, with manager Martin Foyle saying he "did well". After playing in the 1–0 friendly victory over Morecambe Foyle said he was interested in signing Knight. He eventually signed for the club on 30 July. His debut came in a 2–1 victory over Forest Green Rovers on 22 January 2011 as Michael Ingham was serving a one-match suspension. This proved to be his only appearance for the club. With another year remaining on his Histon contract, he was unsure of his future at the club after returning, while player-manager David Livermore said he intended to transfer Knight from the club. He was handed a free transfer by the club and allowed to talk to other clubs.

Following the cancellation of his contract at Histon by mutual consent, Knight signed for Conference North rivals Blyth Spartans, where he had made 18 appearances during an earlier three-month loan spell. He left the club at the beginning of the 2012–13 season, signing for Spennymoor Town in August 2012 before leaving in 2014.

== International career ==
Knight was capped for England at under-16, under-17 and under-18 level. He was part of the under-17 team that participated in the 2004 Algarve Tournament. He was called into the under-19 squad in May 2006 as a replacement for Ben Alnwick.

== Style of play ==
Knight plays as a goalkeeper. He said in 2010 that "shot-stopping is a strength of mine".

== Career statistics ==
As of match played 22 January 2011.

| Club | Season | League | | | FA Cup | | League Cup | | Other | | Total | |
| Club | Season | Division | Apps | Goals | Apps | Goals | Apps | Goals | Apps | Goals | Apps | Goals |
|---|---|---|---|---|---|---|---|---|---|---|---|---|
| Middlesbrough | 2004–05 | FA Premier League | 0 | 0 | 0 | 0 | 0 | 0 | 0 | 0 | 0 | 0 |
| Middlesbrough | 2005–06 | FA Premier League | 0 | 0 | 0 | 0 | 0 | 0 | 0 | 0 | 0 | 0 |
| Middlesbrough | 2006–07 | FA Premier League | 0 | 0 | 0 | 0 | 0 | 0 | — | | 0 | 0 |
| Middlesbrough | Total | | 0 | 0 | 0 | 0 | 0 | 0 | 0 | 0 | 0 | 0 |
| Darlington (loan) | 2005–06 | League Two | 3 | 0 | 0 | 0 | 0 | 0 | 0 | 0 | 3 | 0 |
| Oldham Athletic (loan) | 2006–07 | League One | 2 | 0 | 0 | 0 | 0 | 0 | 0 | 0 | 2 | 0 |
| Swansea City | 2007–08 | League One | 0 | 0 | 1 | 0 | 0 | 0 | 0 | 0 | 1 | 0 |
| Mansfield Town | 2008–09 | Conference Premier | 0 | 0 | 0 | 0 | — | | 0 | 0 | 0 | 0 |
| Middlesbrough | 2008–09 | Premier League | 0 | 0 | 0 | 0 | 0 | 0 | — | | 0 | 0 |
| Darlington | 2009–10 | League Two | 7 | 0 | 0 | 0 | 1 | 0 | 1 (Note: Appearance in Football League Trophy) | 0 | 9 | 0 |
| Histon | 2009–10 | Conference Premier | 12 | 0 | 0 | 0 | — | | 0 | 0 | 12 | 0 |
| Histon | 2010–11 | Conference Premier | 0 | 0 | 0 | 0 | — | | 0 | 0 | 0 | 0 |
| Histon | Total | | 12 | 0 | 0 | 0 | — | | 0 | 0 | 12 | 0 |
| York City (loan) | 2010–11 | Conference Premier | 1 | 0 | 0 | 0 | — | | 0 | 0 | 1 | 0 |
| Career total | | | 25 | 0 | 1 | 0 | 1 | 0 | 1 | 0 | 28 | 0 |
