= Jonathan Woodgate =

English football player and coach (born 1980)

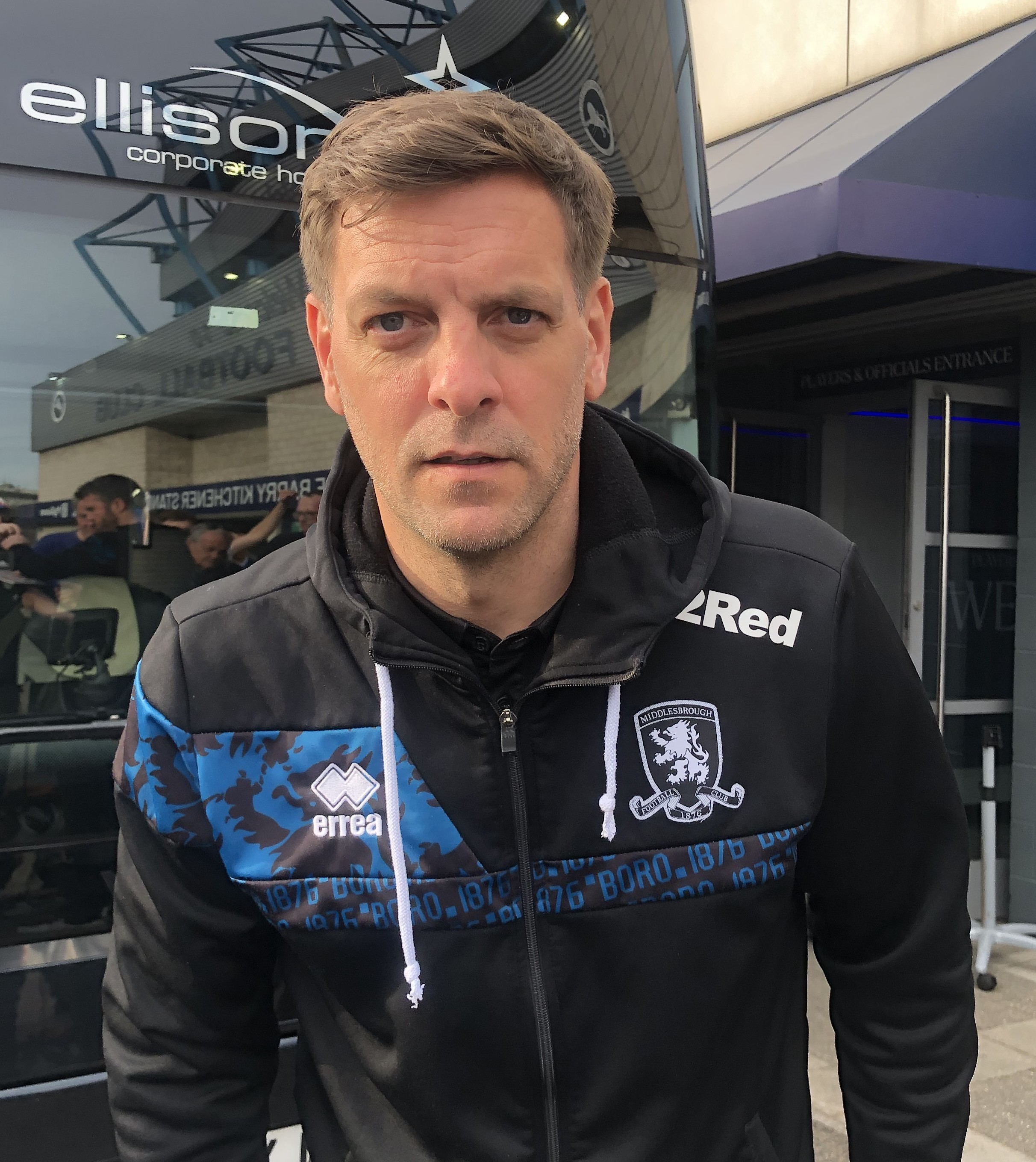
- Woodgate in 2025

Personal information
- Full name: Jonathan Simon Woodgate
- Date of birth: 22 January 1980 (age 46)
- Place of birth: Nunthorpe, Middlesbrough, England
- Height: 6 ft 2 in (1.88 m)
- Position: Centre-back

Youth career
- Nunthorpe Athletic
- Marton
- 1993–1996: Middlesbrough
- 1996–1998: Leeds United

Senior career*
| Years | Team | Apps | (Gls) |
| 1998–2003 | Leeds United | 104 | (5) |
| 2003–2004 | Newcastle United | 28 | (0) |
| 2004–2007 | Real Madrid | 9 | (0) |
| 2006–2007 | → Middlesbrough (loan) | 30 | (0) |
| 2007–2008 | Middlesbrough | 16 | (0) |
| 2008–2011 | Tottenham Hotspur | 49 | (2) |
| 2011–2012 | Stoke City | 17 | (0) |
| 2012–2016 | Middlesbrough | 57 | (2) |
| Total | | 310 | (9) |

International career
| 1997 | England U16 | 1 | (0) |
| 1997–1998 | England U18 | 7 | (0) |
| 2000 | England U21 | 1 | (0) |
| 1999–2008 | England | 8 | (0) |

Managerial career
- 2019–2020: Middlesbrough
- 2021: Bournemouth
- * Club domestic league appearances and goals

Jonathan Simon Woodgate (born 22 January 1980) is an English football coach and former professional player he was most recently first-team coach at Premier League club Manchester United.

Woodgate began his career at Middlesbrough but moved to Leeds United at the age of sixteen. He was sold to Newcastle United for £9 million in 2003, where he impressed despite injury problems. His performances in Europe for Newcastle led to Real Madrid signing him for £13.4 million in 2004. Injuries blighted his time in Madrid, and throughout his career, and he failed to make a single appearance in the entire 2004–05 season. On his debut for Real Madrid, he scored an own goal and was sent off for two bookable offences.

He went on to play 14 times for them before joining his hometown club Middlesbrough on loan, then permanently for a fee of £7 million. He joined Tottenham Hotspur for £8 million in 2008. He scored the winning goal for Spurs in the League Cup final against Chelsea and went on to play 44 times in the 2008–09 season. After more injury problems, he only made four appearances in the next two seasons and was released in 2011 and signed a pay-as-you-play deal with Stoke City. He spent the 2011–12 season at Stoke and after his contract expired re-signed for Middlesbrough, remaining there until his retirement in 2016.

Following retirement, Woodgate took up various coaching roles at Middlesbrough until June 2019 when he was appointed manager of the club, following the departure of Tony Pulis. He remained in the role for just over a year before he was dismissed in June 2020. He joined the coaching staff at Bournemouth on 1 February 2021 before being appointed as caretaker manager two days later, following the sacking of Jason Tindall. On 21 February, he was given the role until the end of the season, but left in June after failing to lead the club back to the Premier League via the playoffs.

== Club career ==
=== Leeds United ===
Woodgate began his career at Middlesbrough but moved to Leeds United at the age of sixteen after disagreements over his future between Middlesbrough and his family. He helped Leeds to win the FA Youth Cup in 1997, and in October the following year made his debut for the senior side. Woodgate was a consistent and impressive performer for Leeds during his time at the club, competing with the likes of Rio Ferdinand, Lucas Radebe and Dominic Matteo for a starting place. He was regarded as one of the most complete all round players to come through the Leeds academy, and performed for Leeds in a time when they competed in the UEFA Cup, Champions League and regularly finished towards the top of the Premier League.

His number of appearances were heavily reduced due to picking up several injuries on different occasions. But as a result of Leeds' financial problems Woodgate was sold to Newcastle to raise funds. He was described as the club's 'jewel in the crown' and his sale caused anger for many Leeds United fans as Peter Ridsdale revealed the perilous financial situation at the club. The sale also led to the dismissal of Terry Venables, who disagreed with Woodgate's departure.

=== Newcastle United ===
Woodgate signed for Newcastle United in January 2003 for £9 million with add ons. He impressed and quickly became a fan favourite. One of his finest games came in Newcastle's 2004 UEFA Cup semi final clash with Marseille, completely nullifying the threat of their forward line and clinical forward Didier Drogba. However, a serious injury saw Woodgate end his final season early, and he could not feature in the second leg, where Newcastle were defeated 2–0 and knocked out.

=== Real Madrid ===
Woodgate signed for Real Madrid in August 2004 for a transfer fee of £13.4 million. This was to the surprise of many in the football world, due to his frequent absences through injury at his previous clubs, and indeed he was injured at the time of the transfer.

Woodgate did not make any appearances for Real Madrid in his first season in Spain, eventually making his debut on 22 September 2005, in a league match against Athletic Bilbao. The game did not go well for him, as he scored an own goal and was later sent off for a second bookable offence. He scored his only goal for Real Madrid by heading the equaliser in the 4–1 UEFA Champions League defeat of Rosenborg on 19 October, his first appearance for the club in European competition.

By February 2006, Woodgate had established himself as a first team player, with the other centre half position rotating among Sergio Ramos, Iván Helguera, Francisco Pavón and Álvaro Mejía. However, further injury setbacks again stopped him playing. He was considered to have an outside chance of making the England squad for the 2006 FIFA World Cup, but due to surgery on his back was not named in the squad.

In July 2007, Woodgate was voted the worst signing of the 21st century by users of the website of Spain's leading sports daily, Marca, polling 37.11% of the votes cast.

=== Middlesbrough ===
Woodgate playing for Middlesbrough in 2007.

On 30 August 2006, Woodgate signed a one-year loan move to hometown club Middlesbrough. He made his debut against Arsenal at the Emirates Stadium on 9 September. He was later voted man of the match by local radio station, Century FM. In April 2007, Middlesbrough announced Woodgate would be their first summer signing for a fee of £7 million. He signed a four-year contract, keeping him at the club until June 2011.

In October 2007, he was crowned North East Player of the Year by the Prince's Trust, beating players from Newcastle and Sunderland. During the 2007–08 pre-season Woodgate suffered an injury that allowed fellow hometown defender David Wheater to start in his place during pre-season. Wheater's form in pre-season earned him a place in the starting XI for the opening day Premier League fixture – Wheater's form then continued which triggered the transfer of Woodgate to Tottenham Hotspur.

=== Tottenham Hotspur ===
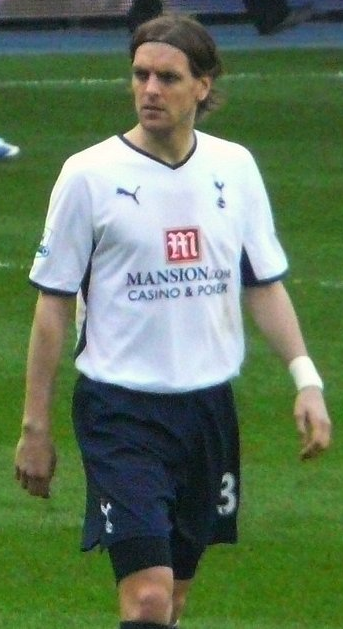
Woodgate playing for Tottenham Hotspur in 2009

After rejecting the chance to re-sign for Newcastle, Woodgate moved to Tottenham Hotspur for a reported fee of £8 million on 28 January 2008. He made his Tottenham debut against Everton two days later and scored his first Tottenham goal on 24 February 2008 which was a header in the League Cup final against Chelsea in extra-time to win Tottenham their first trophy since 1999. His performance won him the Man of the match award. Woodgate scored his first Spurs league goal on 19 March 2008, coincidentally also against Chelsea, in a 4–4 draw at White Hart Lane. He first captained Tottenham in a 2–1 defeat at White Hart Lane to Aston Villa on 15 September. Following Harry Redknapp's appointment, Woodgate became the second vice-captain, behind Robbie Keane.

On Spurs' disastrous start to the 2008–09 season, Woodgate told the press that it was worse than when Leeds were relegated. Woodgate had been transferred to Newcastle United some 16 months before Leeds's eventual relegation at the end of 2003–04. Woodgate played just three times in Spurs highly successful 2009–10 campaign after succumbing to a long term groin injury. Harry Redknapp hinted at Woodgate's exit due to having to comply with new Premier League rules which limited squad sizes to 25 – ironically these rules were put in place in order to help the careers of English and Welsh footballers. Woodgate travelled to Australia to have surgery.

On 19 January 2011, Woodgate played his first game in 14 months in a friendly match with QPR. The defender completed 45 minutes in a 9–2 victory at Spurs Lodge. Following this, on 15 February, a Champions League tie with Milan, he came on in the 59th minute for the injured Vedran Ćorluka. He played out the rest of the game; however, was later diagnosed with a strain to his left adductor muscle. Spurs were unsuccessful in persuading Woodgate to agree a pay-as-you-play deal, and he was released on 16 June 2011.

=== Stoke City ===
Woodgate signed a one-year contract on a pay-as-you-play deal with Stoke City on 11 July 2011, with a view of a further year on his contract, if he proved his fitness. Following his move to Stoke, Woodgate stated that he wanted to get his career back on track. He also said that he turned down a number of other contract offers from different clubs. He made his debut for Stoke in a pre-season friendly against Aldershot Town, playing for 62 minutes. He made his full debut for Stoke in a 1–0 win over Hajduk Split in the UEFA Europa League, playing the full 90 minutes. He then completed his first full 90 minutes in the Premier League for Stoke in a 0–0 draw with Chelsea. Woodgate was left out of Stoke's Europa League squad by manager Tony Pulis who feared a recurrence of Woodgate's injuries if he spent too long travelling.

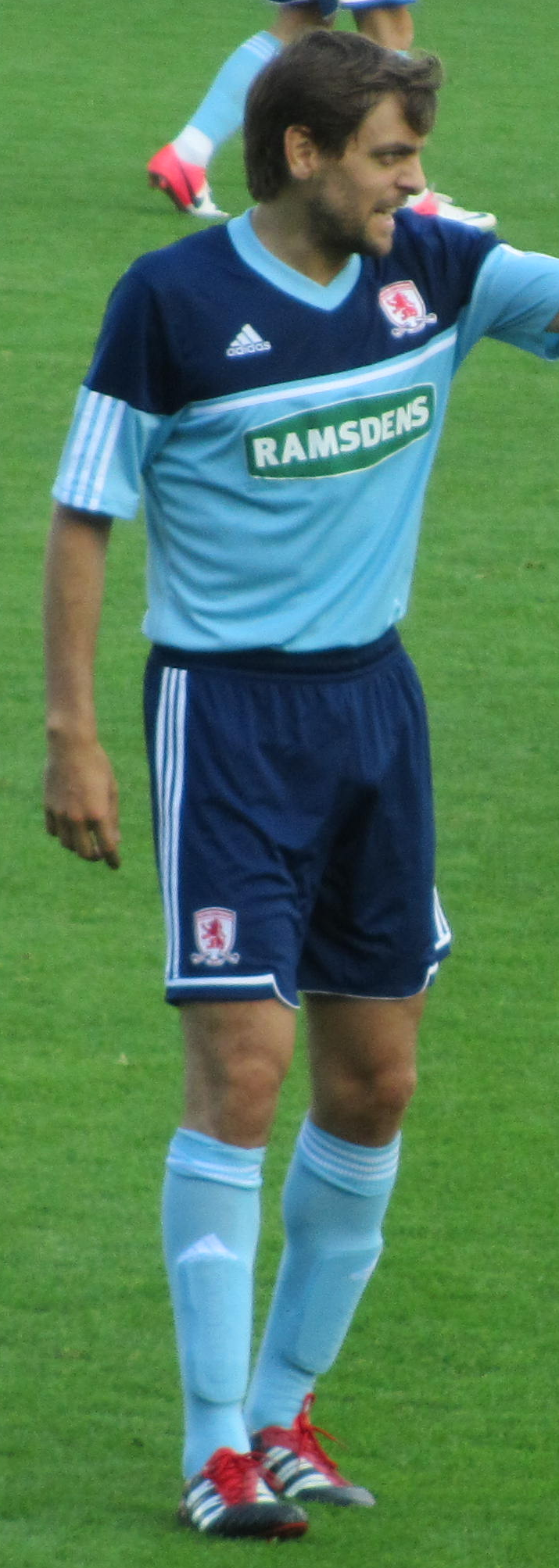
Woodgate playing for Middlesbrough in 2012

Despite a decent enough start to his Stoke career, Woodgate went on to have poor performances against Sunderland, Newcastle, and Bolton. He was dropped by Pulis and admitted that he needed to up his game. In a match against Wolverhampton Wanderers Woodgate started the match at right back. He struggled against Matt Jarvis and gave away a penalty, then was substituted after twenty minutes by Pulis. He continued to play at right back though and admitted that his performances at Stoke had been 'up and down'. His contract with Stoke expired on 30 June 2012 and despite being offered a new deal he chose to return to his former club, Middlesbrough.

=== Return to Middlesbrough ===
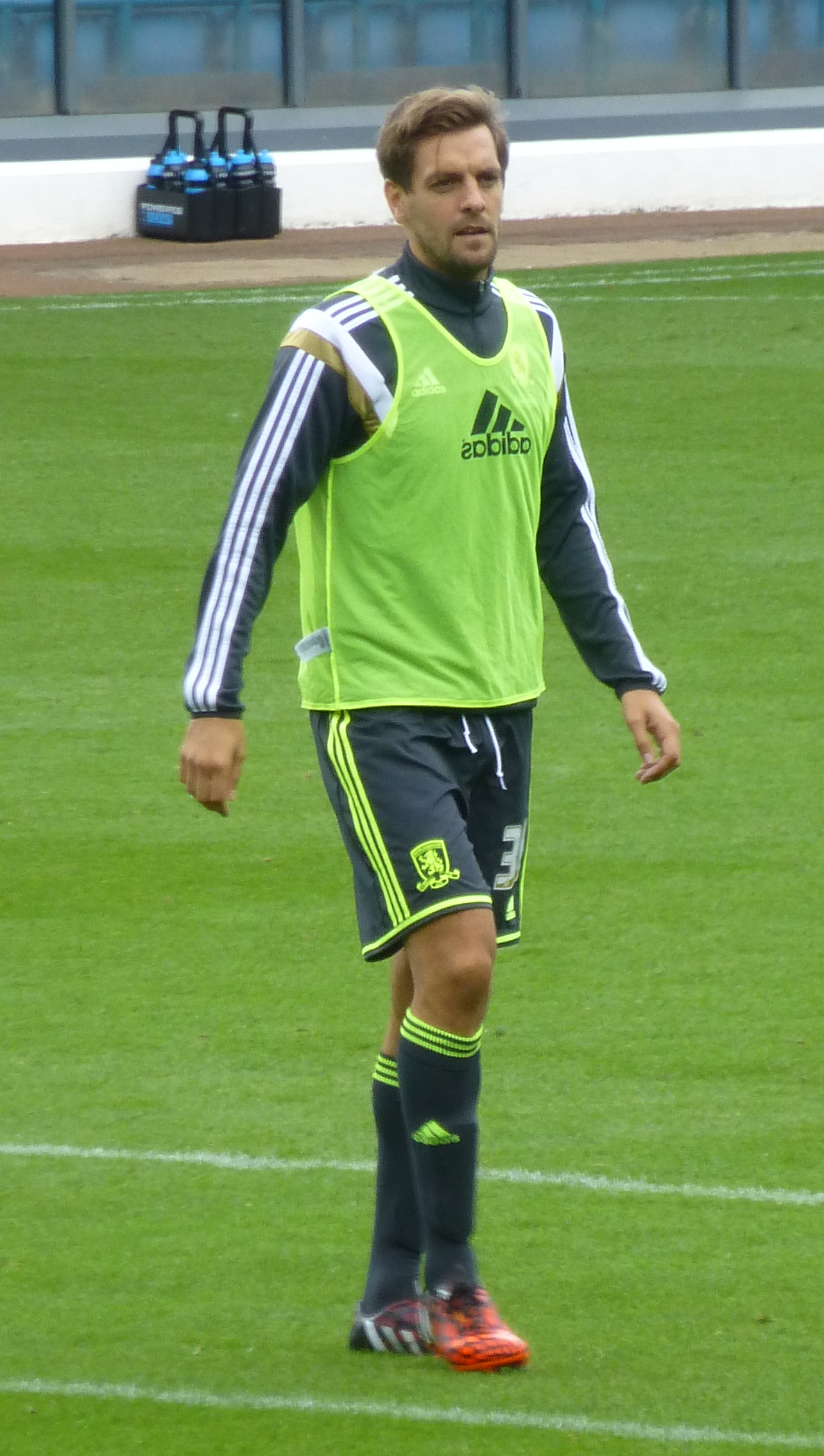
Woodgate playing for Middlesbrough in 2014.

Woodgate re-joined his hometown club Middlesbrough on 6 July 2012, signing a three-year contract. He made his second debut for Boro against Bury in the League Cup on 11 August. Woodgate scored his first goal for Middlesbrough in a 4–1 victory against Charlton Athletic on 3 November.

On 10 February 2015, Woodgate started a match for Middlesbrough for the first time in 6 months and scored the first goal in a 2–1 win against Blackpool which sent Boro to the top of the Championship table. He was an unused substitute on 25 May as they lost the play-off final to Norwich City at Wembley. On 16 July 2015, Woodgate signed a one-year extension despite previously announcing retirement as a player. After playing only one game in the 2015–16 season, Woodgate left Middlesbrough on the expiration of his contract in May 2016 and retired from football.

== International career ==
Woodgate was first called up to the England squad in April 1999, Kevin Keegan named him in the squad for the friendly against Hungary. However, he picked up an injury playing for Leeds United and had to withdraw from the squad. In May 1999, he was called up for the Euro 2000 qualifiers against Sweden and Bulgaria. On 9 June, Woodgate made his debut in the 1–1 draw against Bulgaria; he started the game before being replaced by Ray Parlour in the 64th minute. He retained his place in the squad for the Euro 2000 qualifiers against Luxembourg and Poland, but did not feature in either game. Woodgate was called up for the friendly against Belgium in October 1999, but he later withdrew from the squad because of a back injury. This turned out to be his last involvement with the England squad for nearly three years. The Football Association decided that Woodgate would not be allowed to play for England until the court case stemming from an incident during a night out in Leeds in January 2000 was over, and any subsequent punishments served. This meant he would miss out on both Euro 2000 and the 2002 FIFA World Cup.

On 2 September 2002, manager Sven-Göran Eriksson recalled Woodgate to the England squad for the friendly against Portugal. He went on to earn his second cap, replacing Rio Ferdinand at half-time in the 1–1 draw at Villa Park. Woodgate was called up for the Euro 2004 qualifiers against Slovakia and Macedonia in October 2002; he started and played the whole 90 minutes in both games. Injuries blighted Woodgate over the next couple of years, but he did manage to win his fifth cap in a friendly against Sweden on 31 March 2004. He started in the 1–0 defeat at Ullevi in Gothenburg, and was replaced by Anthony Gardner at half-time. A thigh injury picked up whilst playing for Newcastle United, in April 2004, ruled Woodgate out of the Euro 2004 tournament in Portugal.

After almost three years without an international cap, England manager Steve McClaren recalled Woodgate to the squad for the friendly against Spain in February 2007. On 7 February, Woodgate started in the 1–0 defeat at Old Trafford, before being replaced by Jamie Carragher in the 65th minute. The following month, he retained his place in the squad for the Euro 2008 qualifiers against Israel and Andorra. He would go on to miss both games because of a knee injury. In early 2008, Woodgate was named in Fabio Capello's first two England squads, for the friendlies against Switzerland and France, but failed to feature in either game. In May 2008, Woodgate was named in the England squad for the end-of-season friendlies against the United States and Trinidad and Tobago. He was an unused substitute in the 2–0 win against the United States, before winning his seventh cap in the 3–0 win against Trinidad and Tobago. On 20 August, Woodgate won his eighth and last cap in the friendly against the Czech Republic, he replaced Rio Ferdinand in the 58th minute of the 2–2 draw at Wembley.

== Coaching career ==
=== Middlesbrough ===
After a brief spell as an international scout for Liverpool in Spain and Portugal, on 31 March 2017, Woodgate was appointed as an assistant coach to newly appointed Middlesbrough caretaker manager Steve Agnew, following the dismissal of Aitor Karanka, with Woodgate becoming one of three new arrivals in the club's coaching staff alongside fellow part-timers Joe Jordan and Paul Jenkins. After the club were relegated from the Premier League at the end of the season, Woodgate vacated his position after new manager Garry Monk brought in his own coaching staff, with him being replaced by James Beattie.

Following his departure from the first team, Woodgate joined the club's Academy coaching staff in June 2017, as the under-18 team's assistant coach under Mark Tinkler. In December 2017, Woodgate returned to his previous position as first team assistant coach, under the management of Tony Pulis, who replaced a dismissed Monk. In May 2019, Woodgate was the only member of Pulis' coaching staff not to be relieved from his duties, which saw him become the frontrunner to succeed the Welshman.

On 14 June 2019, Woodgate was appointed as the new permanent manager of Middlesbrough, signing onto a three-year contract. He brought in former associates Robbie Keane and Leo Percovich as his assistants, whereas Danny Coyne was appointed as the club's new goalkeeping coach. Following his appointment, Woodgate stated that he wanted to reintroduce attacking football to the club, having informed club chairman Steve Gibson that he wanted to "play a more expansive game", with both parties wanting to redevelop the team's style of play after Pulis' controversial spell.

The summer transfer window saw Middlesbrough complete the signings of former club goalkeeper Tomás Mejías, Marcus Browne, Marc Bola and Anfernee Dijksteel. Woodgate's first game as a manager came on 2 August, a 3–3 draw against newly promoted Luton Town, which saw supporters criticise his side's defence. At the end of August, Middlesbrough sat eighteenth in the Championship, having recorded a single victory out of a possible six as well as collecting three draws and two defeats. Middlesbrough slipped into the relegation zone following a goalless draw against Fulham, remaining there for a further two matches until a 2–2 draw with Hull City saw them climb into twenty-first, only qualifying for a higher league position through goal difference.

After an indifferent start to management, some Middlesbrough supporters demanded for Woodgate to be sacked, with many doubting his side's ability to avoid relegation. With pressure mounting on Woodgate, tabloids alleged that former Cardiff City manager Neil Warnock was favoured to replace him. December, however, was a positive month for Middlesbrough; recording four victories as well as a singular draw and defeat. Crucial victories over Charlton Athletic, Stoke City, Huddersfield Town and then-league leaders West Bromwich Albion, a draw over Nottingham Forest and defeat to Swansea City saw them rise up to sixteenth in the Championship table, finishing off 2019 nine points above the relegation zone. As a result of Middlesbrough's turn around in form, Woodgate was rewarded as being named the Championship Manager of the Month for December.

During the winter transfer window, Middlesbrough were heavily active: Patrick Roberts, Lukas Nmecha, Ravel Morrison and Harold Moukoudi all arrived on loan, whereas Dejan Stojanović joined for an undisclosed fee from St. Gallen. Middlesbrough dipped in form resulting in Woodgate's side heavily dropping down the league table; a 1–0 defeat to Leeds United saw Middlesbrough drop to twenty-first. After this, supporters once again demanded for Woodgate to be sacked; the manager later assured unsettled supporters that Gibson continued to "back him" despite their frequent dip in form.

Woodgate was dismissed as Middlesbrough manager on 23 June 2020, with the club only outside the Championship relegation zone on goal difference after 38 games, following a 3–0 home defeat to Swansea in the club's first game following the season's restart. He was replaced by Neil Warnock on the same day.

=== Bournemouth ===
On 1 February 2021, Woodgate was appointed as senior first team coach of Bournemouth on a contract until the end of the 2020–21 season. Following the dismissal of manager Jason Tindall two days later, Woodgate was appointed as caretaker manager on a temporary basis, before being appointed head coach until the end of the season on 21 February 2021. Following six wins from seven games, confirming their place in the play-offs in the process, Woodgate was awarded the Championship Manager of the Month award for April 2021. Bournemouth finished the season in 6th place and entered the playoffs against Brentford, but despite winning 1–0 during the first leg, they lost 3–2 on aggregate, consigning them to another season in the championship. Scott Parker was appointed on 28 June 2021 as Woodgate's successor and Woodgate subsequently left the club upon his contract's end.

=== Return to Middlesbrough ===
Woodgate returned to Middlesbrough in October 2022 as a first-team coach following the appointment of new manager Michael Carrick. He departed the club alongside Carrick in June 2025.

=== Manchester United ===
In January 2026, he was appointed as interim first-team coach of Manchester United, again working alongside interim head coach Michael Carrick.

== Personal life ==
Woodgate grew up supporting his local side Middlesbrough and cites Gary Pallister as his hero.

Woodgate has two children with his wife Natalie Downing, the sister of former Middlesbrough teammate and England midfielder Stewart Downing.

In 2000, Woodgate was a defendant with teammate Lee Bowyer in a court case after his involvement in an altercation outside the Majestyk nightclub in Leeds, in which a student was left unconscious lying in his own blood, with a broken cheekbone, broken nose, fractured leg, bitemarks on his face and a wound in the back of his head requiring a dozen stitches, after a group including several Leeds United players had attacked him. The initial trial at Kingston upon Hull Crown Court collapsed, and following a second trial, also at Kingston upon Hull Crown Court in December 2001, Bowyer was cleared of charges of grievous bodily harm with intent and affray, while Woodgate was convicted of affray and sentenced to 100 hours' community service. He was also banned from international selection by the Football Association, which prevented him from being selected in the England squad for the 2000 European Championship and the 2002 World Cup.

== Career statistics ==
=== Club ===
Appearances and goals by club, season and competition
| Club | Season | League | | | National cup (Note: Includes FA Cup, Copa del Rey) | | League cup (Note: Includes Football League Cup) | | Europe | | Total | |
| Club | Season | Division | Apps | Goals | Apps | Goals | Apps | Goals | Apps | Goals | Apps | Goals |
|---|---|---|---|---|---|---|---|---|---|---|---|---|
| Leeds United | 1998–99 | Premier League | 25 | 2 | 5 | 0 | 2 | 0 | 1 (Note: Appearances in UEFA Cup) | 0 | 33 | 2 |
| Leeds United | 1999–2000 | Premier League | 34 | 1 | 4 | 0 | 1 | 0 | 10 | 0 | 49 | 1 |
| Leeds United | 2000–01 | Premier League | 14 | 1 | 1 | 0 | 1 | 0 | 5 (Note: Appearances in UEFA Champions League) | 0 | 21 | 1 |
| Leeds United | 2001–02 | Premier League | 13 | 0 | 1 | 0 | 1 | 0 | 0 | 0 | 15 | 0 |
| Leeds United | 2002–03 | Premier League | 18 | 1 | 1 | 0 | 1 | 0 | 4 | 0 | 24 | 1 |
| Leeds United | Total | | 104 | 5 | 12 | 0 | 6 | 0 | 20 | 0 | 142 | 5 |
| Newcastle United | 2002–03 | Premier League | 10 | 0 | 0 | 0 | 0 | 0 | 0 | 0 | 10 | 0 |
| Newcastle United | 2003–04 | Premier League | 18 | 0 | 2 | 0 | 0 | 0 | 7 (Note: Two appearances in UEFA Champions League, five in UEFA Cup) | 0 | 27 | 0 |
| Newcastle United | Total | | 28 | 0 | 2 | 0 | 0 | 0 | 7 | 0 | 37 | 0 |
| Real Madrid | 2004–05 | La Liga | 0 | 0 | 0 | 0 | — | | 0 | 0 | 0 | 0 |
| Real Madrid | 2005–06 | La Liga | 9 | 0 | 2 | 0 | — | | 3 | 1 | 14 | 1 |
| Real Madrid | Total | | 9 | 0 | 2 | 0 | — | | 3 | 1 | 14 | 1 |
| Middlesbrough | 2006–07 | Premier League | 30 | 0 | 6 | 0 | 0 | 0 | — | | 36 | 0 |
| Middlesbrough | 2007–08 | Premier League | 16 | 0 | 0 | 0 | 0 | 0 | — | | 16 | 0 |
| Middlesbrough | Total | | 46 | 0 | 6 | 0 | 0 | 0 | 0 | 0 | 52 | 0 |
| Tottenham Hotspur | 2007–08 | Premier League | 12 | 1 | 0 | 0 | 1 | 1 | 4 | 0 | 17 | 2 |
| Tottenham Hotspur | 2008–09 | Premier League | 34 | 1 | 1 | 0 | 4 | 0 | 5 | 0 | 44 | 1 |
| Tottenham Hotspur | 2009–10 | Premier League | 3 | 0 | 0 | 0 | 0 | 0 | 0 | 0 | 3 | 0 |
| Tottenham Hotspur | 2010–11 | Premier League | 0 | 0 | 0 | 0 | 0 | 0 | 1 | 0 | 1 | 0 |
| Tottenham Hotspur | Total | | 49 | 2 | 1 | 0 | 5 | 1 | 10 | 0 | 65 | 3 |
| Stoke City | 2011–12 | Premier League | 17 | 0 | 1 | 0 | 1 | 0 | 2 (Note: Appearances in UEFA Europa League) | 0 | 21 | 0 |
| Middlesbrough | 2012–13 | Championship | 24 | 1 | 0 | 0 | 1 | 0 | — | | 25 | 1 |
| Middlesbrough | 2013–14 | Championship | 25 | 0 | 0 | 0 | 0 | 0 | — | | 25 | 0 |
| Middlesbrough | 2014–15 | Championship | 8 | 1 | 0 | 0 | 1 | 0 | — | | 9 | 1 |
| Middlesbrough | 2015–16 | Championship | 0 | 0 | 0 | 0 | 1 | 0 | — | | 1 | 0 |
| Middlesbrough | Total | | 57 | 2 | 0 | 0 | 3 | 0 | 0 | 0 | 61 | 2 |
| Career total | | | 310 | 9 | 24 | 0 | 15 | 1 | 42 | 1 | 391 | 11 |

=== International ===
Appearances and goals by national team and year

| National team | Year | Apps | Goals |
|---|---|---|---|
England
| England | 1999 | 1 | 0 |
| England | 2000 | 0 | 0 |
| England | 2001 | 0 | 0 |
| England | 2002 | 3 | 0 |
| England | 2003 | 0 | 0 |
| England | 2004 | 1 | 0 |
| England | 2005 | 0 | 0 |
| England | 2006 | 0 | 0 |
| England | 2007 | 1 | 0 |
| England | 2008 | 2 | 0 |
| Total | | 8 | 0 |

== Managerial statistics ==
As of match played 22 May 2021

Managerial record by team and tenure
| Team | From | To | Record | | | | | Ref. |
| Team | From | To | G | W | D | L | Win % | Ref. |
|---|---|---|---|---|---|---|---|---|
| Middlesbrough | 14 June 2019 | 23 June 2020 | 41 | 9 | 16 | 16 | 21.95 | |
| Bournemouth | 3 February 2021 | 28 June 2021 | 23 | 13 | 2 | 8 | 56.52 | |
| Total | | | 64 | 22 | 18 | 24 | 34.38 | — |

== Honours ==
=== As a player ===
Tottenham Hotspur

- Football League Cup: 2007–08

Individual

- Middlesbrough Player of the Year: 2006–07
- Alan Hardaker Trophy: 2008

=== As a manager ===
Individual

- EFL Championship Manager of the Month: December 2019, April 2021
