= 2008 Football League Cup final =

- Event: 2007–08 Football League Cup
Chelsea	Tottenham Hotspur
1	2
- After extra time
- Date: 24 February 2008
- Venue: Wembley Stadium, London
- Man of the Match: Jonathan Woodgate (Tottenham Hotspur)
- Referee: Mark Halsey (Lancashire)
- Attendance: 87,660
- Weather: Partly cloudy 13 °C (55 °F)

The 2008 Football League Cup final was a football match played on 24 February 2008. It was the first League Cup Final to be played at the new Wembley Stadium, and the first to be played in England since the old Wembley was demolished in 2000. The defending champions were Chelsea, who beat Arsenal in the 2007 final at Cardiff's Millennium Stadium. The final was contested by Tottenham Hotspur, who beat Arsenal 6–2 on aggregate in the semi-final, and Chelsea, who beat Everton 3–1 on aggregate. Tottenham Hotspur defeated Chelsea 2–1 after extra time, winning their first trophy in nine years.

Chelsea took the lead in the 39th minute through a free kick from Didier Drogba. This goal made Drogba the first player to score in three League Cup finals, having scored in 2005 and 2007. In the 68th minute, Tottenham were awarded a penalty after Wayne Bridge handled the ball; Dimitar Berbatov converted the spot-kick and equalised. Three minutes into extra time, Jonathan Woodgate headed a Jermaine Jenas free kick onto Petr Čech, who in turn pushed it straight back onto Woodgate's head to score the winning goal.

The win was important for Tottenham as not only did they end a nine-year trophy drought, but the win secured the club qualification for the following season's UEFA Cup, something they would not have achieved in the Premier League, as they finished 11th. This would be the last major trophy Tottenham would win for seventeen years, until the club won the 2025 UEFA Europa League final against Manchester United. For Chelsea, it was the second of four competitions in which they would finish as runners-up that season, after they lost to Manchester United in the Community Shield and ended up finishing as runners-up to the same team in the Premier League and the UEFA Champions League. The two teams would meet again in the 2015 League Cup final, in which Chelsea beat Tottenham 2–0.

== Road to Wembley ==
Chelsea		Round	Tottenham	
Opponent	Score	Round	Opponent	Score
Hull City (A)	4–0	Round 3	Middlesbrough (H)	2–0
Leicester City (H)	4–3	Round 4	Blackpool (H)	2–0
Liverpool (H)	2–0	Round 5	Manchester City (A)	2–0
Everton (H)	2–1	Semi-finals	Arsenal (A)	1–1
Everton (A)	1–0	Semi-finals	Arsenal (H)	5–1
Chelsea won 3–1 on aggregate		Semi-finals	Tottenham Hotspur won 6–2 on aggregate	

As Premier League teams involved in UEFA competitions, both Chelsea and Tottenham entered the League Cup in the third round. Tottenham received a home draw against Middlesbrough, while Chelsea were drawn away to Hull City. Chelsea won their tie 4–0; Scott Sinclair opened the scoring with his first goal for the club in the first half, while a brace from Salomon Kalou either side of another from Steve Sidwell completed the win. Meanwhile, second-half goals from Gareth Bale and Tom Huddlestone sent Tottenham through to the next round. Both teams were drawn at home in the fourth round; Chelsea would face Leicester City, while Tottenham would take on Blackpool. Chelsea had to come from behind twice to beat Leicester; Frank Lampard had given them a 2–1 half-time lead after Gareth McAuley's early goal for Leicester, but DJ Campbell and Carl Cort put the visitors in front with two goals in the space of five second-half minutes. Andriy Shevchenko equalised for Chelsea in the 87th minute, before Lampard completed his hat-trick – and the Chelsea victory – in the final minute of the match. For Tottenham, Robbie Keane opened the scoring in the first half against Blackpool; Pascal Chimbonda doubled the lead in the second half, and the away side were unable to find a response. Chelsea were drawn at home again for the quarter-finals, this time against Liverpool, while Tottenham faced an away tie against Manchester City. Tottenham took an early lead through Jermain Defoe in their quarter-final at the City of Manchester Stadium, but a red card for Didier Zokora in the 20th minute allowed City back into the game; however, Spurs secured victory and a place in the quarter-finals when Steed Malbranque scored in the 82nd minute. The next day, Chelsea had to wait almost an hour to open the scoring against Liverpool at Stamford Bridge, Frank Lampard scoring his fourth goal of the competition; Peter Crouch was sent off for the visitors a minute later, and Shevchenko confirmed the win in the final minute.

In the semi-finals, which would be played over two legs, Tottenham were drawn against their North London rivals Arsenal for the second season in a row, while Chelsea were paired with Everton, the city rivals of their opponents in the previous round. Tottenham were held in their first leg at the Emirates Stadium, thanks to a deflected goal by Theo Walcott; after Jermaine Jenas opened the scoring for Spurs in the first half, Walcott equalised when the ball ricocheted back off him in the midst of a challenge by Lee Young-pyo before looping over Tottenham goalkeeper Radek Černý. In the second leg at White Hart Lane, there was no doubt about the result, as Tottenham ran out 5–1 winners, their first victory over Arsenal in any competition since November 1999. Jenas was again on the scoresheet inside three minutes, before an own goal from Nicklas Bendtner gave Spurs a 2–0 half-time lead; Robbie Keane and Aaron Lennon doubled their advantage before Arsenal scored their first goal through Emmanuel Adebayor, but Malbranque scored in the final minute to secure a 6–2 aggregate victory. Chelsea took the advantage in the first leg of their semi-final at Stamford Bridge despite John Obi Mikel's red card thanks to an own goal by Joleon Lescott in second-half injury time; Shaun Wright-Phillips opened the scoring midway through the first half, but Yakubu equalised in the 64th minute, only for Lescott to head a cross from Wright-Phillips into his own net. In the second leg at Goodison Park, Joe Cole scored the only goal of the game in the 69th minute, giving Chelsea a 3–1 aggregate victory and sending them to their third League Cup final in the last four seasons.

== Match ==
=== Details ===
24 February 2008
15:00 GMT

Chelsea	1–2 (a.e.t.)	Tottenham Hotspur
Drogba 39'	Report	Berbatov 70' (pen.); Woodgate 94'

Wembley Stadium, London
Attendance: 87,660
Referee: Mark Halsey (Lancashire)

Chelsea	Tottenham Hotspur

GK	1	(Czech Republic) Petr Čech	(yellow card) 120+4'
RB	35	(Brazil) Juliano Belletti
CB	26	(England) John Terry (c)
CB	6	(Portugal) Ricardo Carvalho	(yellow card) 104'
LB	18	(England) Wayne Bridge
DM	12	(Nigeria) Mikel John Obi	(yellow card) 96'	(substituted off) 98'
CM	8	(England) Frank Lampard
CM	5	(Ghana) Michael Essien		(substituted off) 88'
RW	24	(England) Shaun Wright-Phillips		(substituted off) 72'
LW	39	(France) Nicolas Anelka
CF	11	(Ivory Coast) Didier Drogba
Substitutes:
GK	23	(Italy) Carlo Cudicini
DF	33	(Brazil) Alex
MF	10	(England) Joe Cole		(substituted on) 98'
MF	13	(Germany) Michael Ballack		(substituted on) 88'
FW	21	(Ivory Coast) Salomon Kalou		(substituted on) 72'
Manager:
(Israel) Avram Grant

GK	1	(England) Paul Robinson
RB	28	(Scotland) Alan Hutton
CB	39	(England) Jonathan Woodgate
CB	26	(England) Ledley King (c)
LB	2	(France) Pascal Chimbonda		(substituted off) 61'
RM	25	(England) Aaron Lennon	(yellow card) 120+1'
CM	8	(England) Jermaine Jenas	(yellow card) 120+3'
CM	4	(Ivory Coast) Didier Zokora	(yellow card) 38'
LM	15	(France) Steed Malbranque		(substituted off) 75'
CF	10	(Republic of Ireland) Robbie Keane		(substituted off) 102'
CF	9	(Bulgaria) Dimitar Berbatov
Substitutes:
GK	12	(Czech Republic) Radek Černý
DF	5	(France) Younès Kaboul		(substituted on) 102'
MF	6	(Finland) Teemu Tainio	(yellow card) 116'	(substituted on) 75'
MF	22	(England) Tom Huddlestone		(substituted on) 61'
FW	23	(England) Darren Bent
Manager:
(Spain) Juande Ramos

Assistant referees:
Andrew Garratt (West Midlands)
Martin Yerby (Kent)
Fourth official:
Peter Walton (Northamptonshire)
Reserve assistant referee:
David Bryan (Lincolnshire)

Man of the match
Jonathan Woodgate (Tottenham Hotspur)

Match rules

- 90 minutes.
- 30 minutes of extra-time if necessary.
- Penalty shoot-out if scores still level.
- Five named substitutes.
- Maximum of three substitutions.

=== Statistics ===
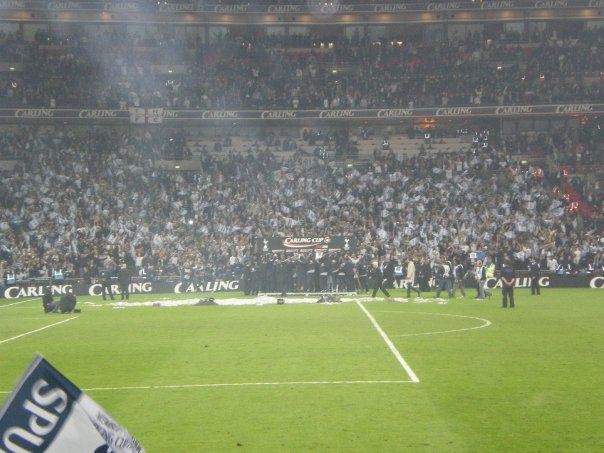
The Tottenham players celebrate after having won their first trophy in nine years.

	Chelsea	Tottenham
Total shots	17	14
Shots on target	11	7
Ball possession	52%	48%
Corner kicks	10	5
Fouls committed	17	20
Offsides	3	2
Yellow cards	2	4
Red cards	0	0

Source: ESPN

== Notes ==
- Didier Drogba's goal made him the all-time leading scorer in League Cup Finals with four. He also became the first player to score in three League Cup finals and the first to score in three consecutive English domestic cup finals.
