= 2007–08 Football League Cup =

Carling Cup, League Cup
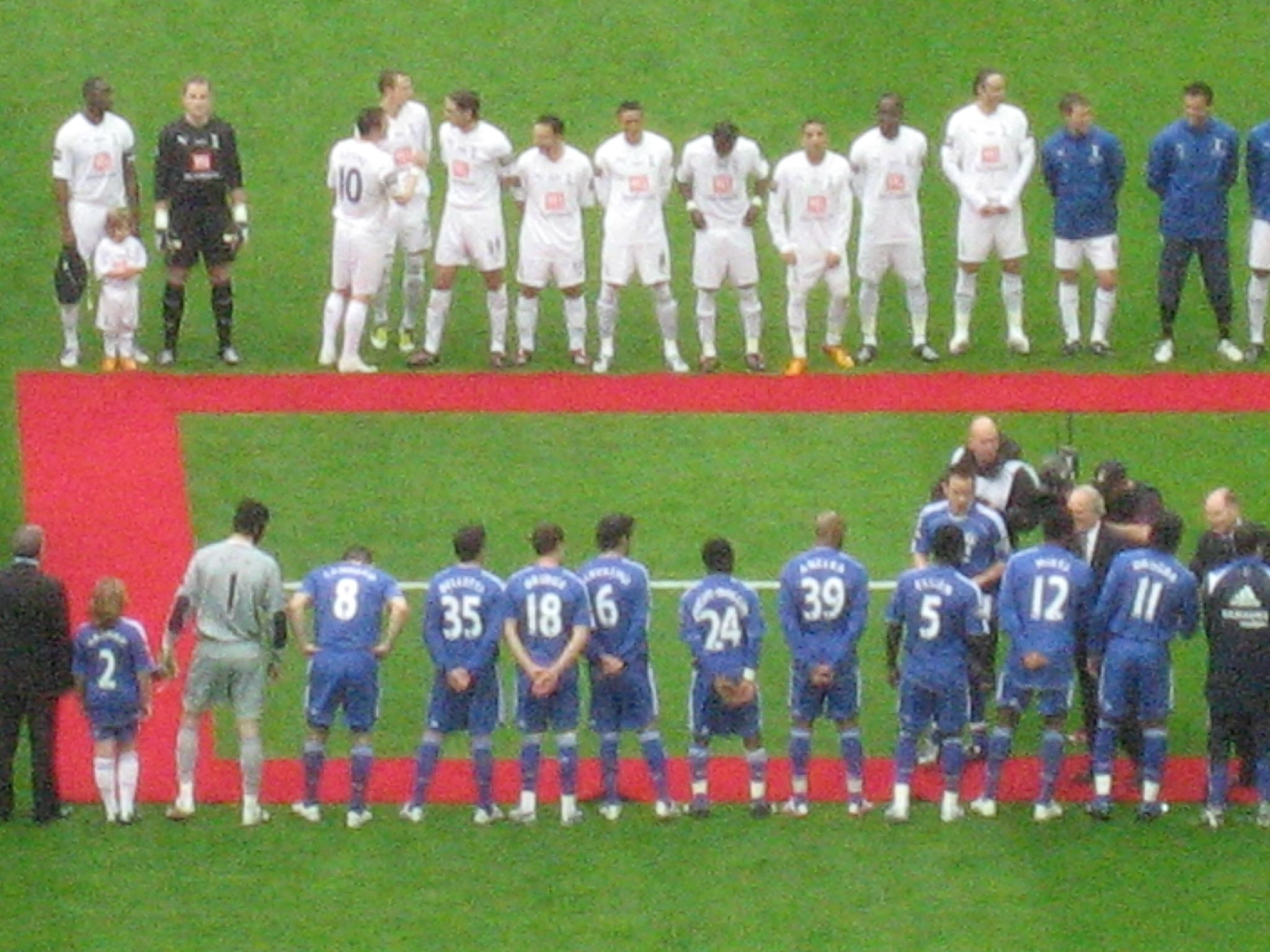
- Tottenham and Chelsea players lined up before the final

Tournament details
- Country: England; Wales
- Teams: 92

Final positions
- Champions: Tottenham Hotspur (4th title)
- Runners-up: Chelsea

Tournament statistics
- Top goal scorer(s): Eduardo; Frank Lampard; Michael Mifsud (4 goals)

The 2007–08 Football League Cup (known as the Carling Cup for sponsorship reasons) was the 48th staging of the Football League Cup, a knock-out competition for the top 92 football clubs played in English football league system. The winners qualified for the first round of the 2008–09 UEFA Cup, if not already qualified for European competitions.

The competition began on 13 August 2007, and ended with the final on 24 February 2008. Wembley Stadium in London hosted the final match for the first time since its major renovation completed.

The tournament was won by Tottenham Hotspur, who beat holders Chelsea 2–1 in the final, thanks to goals from Dimitar Berbatov and Jonathan Woodgate. Didier Drogba scored the opener for Chelsea.

== First round ==
The 72 Football League clubs started in the first round, which was divided into North and South sections. Each section was divided equally into a pot of seeded clubs and a pot of unseeded clubs. Clubs' rankings depended upon their finishing position in the 2006–07 season. Therefore, the clubs relegated from the Premier League in 2007; Watford, Charlton Athletic (south) and Sheffield United (north) were the top seeds, and the clubs newly promoted to the Football League, Morecambe and Dagenham & Redbridge, were bottom seeds in north and south sections respectively.

- On 13 June 2007 seeded clubs and unseeded clubs were paired off to create the first round draw.
- Matches occurred during the week commencing 13 August 2007.
- Extra time played when the scores were level after 90 minutes.

North
Tie no	Home team	Score^{1}	Away team	Attendance
1	Wolverhampton Wanderers	2–1	Bradford City	9,625
2	Grimsby Town	0–0	Burnley	2,431
1–1 after extra time – Burnley won 4–2 on penalties
3	Rochdale	1–1	Stoke City	2,369
2–2 after extra time – Rochdale won 4–2 on penalties
4	Scunthorpe United	1–2	Hartlepool United	2,965
5	Port Vale	1–1	Wrexham	2,916
After extra time – Wrexham won 5–3 on penalties
6	Crewe Alexandra	0–3	Hull City	2,862
7	Chester City	0–0	Nottingham Forest	2,720
After extra time – Nottingham Forest won 4–2 on penalties
8	Sheffield United	3–1	Chesterfield	11,170
9	Rotherham United	1–3	Sheffield Wednesday	6,416
10	Barnsley	2–1	Darlington	3,780
11	Bury	0–1	Carlisle United	2,213
12	Doncaster Rovers	4–1	Lincoln City	5,084
13	Preston North End	1–2	Morecambe	7,703
14	Stockport County	1–0	Tranmere Rovers	3,944
15	Accrington Stanley	0–1	Leicester City	2,029
16	Macclesfield Town	0–1	Leeds United	3,422
17	Oldham Athletic	4–1	Mansfield Town	3,155
18	Blackpool	1–0	Huddersfield Town	6,395

South
Tie no	Home team	Score^{1}	Away team	Attendance
1	Watford	3–0	Gillingham	8,166
2	Swindon Town	0–2	Charlton Athletic	6,175
3	Milton Keynes Dons	2–2	Ipswich Town	7,496
3–3 after extra time – Milton Keynes Dons won 5–3 on penalties
4	Southend United	1–1	Cheltenham Town	3,084
Southend United won 4–1 after extra time
5	Norwich City	5–2	Barnet	13,971
6	Shrewsbury Town	0–0	Colchester United	3,069
Shrewsbury Town won 1–0 after extra time
7	Cardiff City	0–0	Brighton & Hove Albion	3,726
Cardiff City won 1–0 after extra time
8	Swansea City	2–0	Walsall	6,943
9	Brentford	0–3	Bristol City	2,213
10	Bristol Rovers	1–1	Crystal Palace	5,566
After extra time – Bristol Rovers won 4–1 on penalties
11	West Bromwich Albion	1–0	AFC Bournemouth	10,250
12	Peterborough United	2–1	Southampton	4,087
13	Hereford United	4–1	Yeovil Town	2,085
14	Queens Park Rangers	1–2	Leyton Orient	5,260
15	Northampton Town	2–0	Millwall	1,735
16	Dagenham & Redbridge	1–2	Luton Town	1,754
17	Plymouth Argyle	2–1	Wycombe Wanderers	5,474
18	Coventry City	3–0	Notts County	6,735

^{1} Score after 90 minutes

== Second round ==
The 36 winners from the first round joined the 12 Premier League clubs not participating in European competitions in the second round.

- Round two was drawn on 16 August.
- Matches occurred during the week commencing 28 August.
- Extra time played when the scores were level after 90 minutes.

Tie no	Home team	Score^{1}	Away team	Attendance
1	Plymouth Argyle	2–0	Doncaster Rovers	5,133
2	Southend United	2–0	Watford	5,554
3	Nottingham Forest	A–A	Leicester City	
Original match abandoned due to serious player illness; rematch took place on 18 September.
Rematch	Nottingham Forest^{2}	2–3	Leicester City	15,519
4	Wigan Athletic	0–1	Hull City	5,440
5	Birmingham City	2–1	Hereford United	10,185
6	Carlisle United	0–2	Coventry City	5,744
7	Bristol Rovers	1–2	West Ham United	10,831
8	Derby County	1–1	Blackpool	8,658
2–2 after extra time – Blackpool won 7–6 on penalties
9	Rochdale	1–1	Norwich City	2,990
After extra time – Norwich won 4–3 on penalties
10	Portsmouth	3–0	Leeds United	8,502
11	Cardiff City	1–0	Leyton Orient	6,150
12	Milton Keynes Dons	2–2	Sheffield United	7,943
Sheffield United won 3–2 after extra time
13	Burnley	3–0	Oldham Athletic	7,317
14	Swansea City	0–0	Reading	12,027
Reading won 1–0 after extra time
15	Peterborough United	0–2	West Bromwich Albion	4,917
16	Shrewsbury Town	0–1	Fulham	6,223
17	Wolverhampton Wanderers	1–1	Morecambe	11,296
Morecambe won 3–1 after extra time
18	Middlesbrough	2–0	Northampton Town	11,686
19	Sheffield Wednesday	1–1	Hartlepool United	8,751
Sheffield Wednesday won 2–1 after extra time
20	Luton Town	3–0	Sunderland	4,401
21	Wrexham	0–5	Aston Villa	8,221
22	Charlton Athletic	4–3	Stockport County	8,022
23	Newcastle United	2–0	Barnsley	30,523
24	Bristol City	1–2	Manchester City	19,941

^{1} Score after 90 minutes
^{2} As Nottingham Forest were leading 1–0 at the time of the abandonment of the first meeting, they were given a "free goal" by Leicester City, who allowed Forest goalkeeper Paul Smith to dribble up the pitch uncontested and score straight from the kick-off.

== Third round ==
The 24 winners from the second round joined the eight Premier League clubs participating in European competitions in the third round. The draw was made on 1 September. Matches were played on 25 September and 26 September.

Tie no	Home team	Score^{1}	Away team	Attendance
1	Blackburn Rovers	3–0	Birmingham City	9,205
2	Reading	2–4	Liverpool	23,563
3	Manchester United	0–2	Coventry City	74,055
4	Tottenham Hotspur	2–0	Middlesbrough	32,280
5	Hull City	0–4	Chelsea	23,543
6	Blackpool	1–1	Southend United	5,022
Blackpool won 2–1 after extra time
7	West Ham United	1–0	Plymouth Argyle	25,774
8	Arsenal	2–0	Newcastle United	60,004
9	Luton Town	1–1	Charlton Athletic	4,534
Luton Town won 3–1 after extra time
10	Manchester City	1–0	Norwich City	20,938
11	Sheffield United	5–0	Morecambe	8,854
12	Sheffield Wednesday	0–3	Everton	16,463
13	Fulham	1–1	Bolton Wanderers	10,500
Bolton Wanderers won 2–1 after extra time
14	Burnley	0–1	Portsmouth	8,202
15	Aston Villa	0–1	Leicester City	25,956
16	West Bromwich Albion	2–4	Cardiff City	14,085

^{1} Score after 90 minutes

== Fourth round ==
The draw for the fourth round was made on 29 September 2007 and matches were played in the week commencing 29 October.

Tie no	Home team	Score^{1}	Away team	Attendance
1	Luton Town	0–0	Everton	8,944
Everton won 1–0 after extra time
2	Portsmouth	1–2	Blackburn Rovers	11,788
3	Chelsea	4–3	Leicester City	40,037
4	Sheffield United	0–3	Arsenal	16,971
5	Tottenham Hotspur	2–0	Blackpool	32,196
6	Bolton Wanderers	0–1	Manchester City	15,510
7	Coventry City	1–2	West Ham United	23,968
8	Liverpool	2–1	Cardiff City	41,780

^{1} Score after 90 minutes

== Fifth round ==
The draw for the fifth round was made on 3 November 2007. Matches were played in the week beginning 17 December 2007, with the exception of the match between West Ham United and Everton, which was played on 12 December due to Everton's commitments in the UEFA Cup.

12 December 2007
19:45

West Ham United	1–2	Everton
Cole 12'		Osman 40'; Yakubu 88'

Boleyn Ground, London
Attendance: 28,777
Referee: Mark Halsey (Lancashire)

18 December 2007
19:45

Manchester City	0–2	Tottenham Hotspur
	Report	Defoe 5'; Malbranque 82'

City of Manchester Stadium, Manchester
Attendance: 38,564
Referee: Steve Bennett (Kent)

19 December 2007
19:45

Chelsea	2–0	Liverpool
Lampard 59'; Shevchenko 90'	Report

Stamford Bridge, London
Attendance: 41,366
Referee: Martin Atkinson (West Yorkshire)

18 December 2007
20:00

Blackburn Rovers	2–3 (a.e.t.)	Arsenal
Santa Cruz 42', 60'		Diaby 6'; Eduardo 29', 104'

Ewood Park, Blackburn
Attendance: 16,207
Referee: Mike Riley (West Yorkshire)

== Semi-finals ==
The semi-final draw was made on 19 December 2007 at 22:00 GMT. Unlike the other rounds, the semi-final ties were played over two legs, with each team playing one leg at home. The ties were played in the weeks beginning 9 January and 21 January 2008.

=== First leg ===
8 January 2008
19:45

Chelsea	2–1	Everton
Wright-Phillips 26'; Lescott 90+2' (o.g.)		Yakubu 64'

Stamford Bridge, London
Attendance: 41,178
Referee: Peter Walton (Northamptonshire)

9 January 2008
19:45

Arsenal	1–1	Tottenham Hotspur
Walcott 79'	Report	Jenas 37'

Emirates Stadium, London
Attendance: 53,136
Referee: Mike Dean (Wirral)

=== Second leg ===
23 January 2008
20:00

Everton	0–1	Chelsea
		J. Cole 69'

Goodison Park, Liverpool
Attendance: 37,086
Referee: Steve Bennett (Kent)

Chelsea won 3–1 on aggregate

22 January 2008
20:00

Tottenham Hotspur	5–1	Arsenal
Jenas 3'; Bendtner 27' (o.g.); Keane 48'; Lennon 60'; Malbranque 90+4'	Report	Adebayor 70'

White Hart Lane, London
Attendance: 35,979
Referee: Howard Webb (Sheffield & Hallamshire)

Tottenham won 6–2 on aggregate

== Final ==
The 2008 League Cup Final was played on 24 February 2008 and was the first to be played at Wembley Stadium since 2000.

24 February 2008
15:00

Chelsea	1–2 (a.e.t.)	Tottenham Hotspur
Drogba 39'	(Report)	Berbatov 70' (pen.); Woodgate 94'

Wembley Stadium, London
Attendance: 87,660
Referee: Mark Halsey (Lancashire)
