= Kevin Burgess (footballer) =

English footballer

Personal information
- Full name: Kevin Matthew Burgess
- Date of birth: 8 January 1987 (age 39)
- Place of birth: Middlesbrough, England
- Height: 6 ft 0 in (1.83 m)
- Position: Centre back

Team information
- Current team: Redcar Athletic

Youth career
- –2007: Middlesbrough

Senior career*
Years	Team	Apps	(Gls)
2007–2008	Darlington	2	(0)
2008	→ Whitby Town (loan)	5	(0)
2008–2015	Whitby Town		
2015–2018	Darlington (Note: League appearances for 2015–16 sourced to Darlington F.C. League appearances for 2016–17 onwards sourced to Soccerway.)	77	(15)
2017–2018	→ Whitby Town (loan)	287	(18)
2018–2019	Scarborough Athletic	35	(3)
2019–	Marske United	111	(17)
- * Club domestic league appearances and goals as of 09:14, 15 July 2018 (UTC)

Kevin Matthew Burgess (born 8 January 1988) is an English footballer who plays as a centre back for Marske United of the Northern Premier League Premier Division. He appeared in the Football League for Darlington in 2007.

== Life and career ==
Burgess was born in Middlesbrough, and began his football career as a youngster with Middlesbrough F.C. He joined Darlington in January 2007, and after impressing in the reserves, made his debut on the final day of the season, as a second-half substitute in a 5–0 defeat at home to Stockport County.

His contract was extended for another season, and he was given a squad number, but his only first-team appearance was as a substitute in the FA Cup, and he spent the last few weeks of the season on loan to Northern Premier League Premier Division club Whitby Town. On his release from Darlington, he was promptly signed up by that club's former Quakers' defender Phil Brumwell for the 2008–09 season.

Burgess rejoined Darlington from Whitby Town prior to the 2015–16 season, and was appointed captain when Gary Brown joined Shildon. Burgess kept the captaincy when Brown returned early in the season, and they formed a strong defence together which helped Darlington become Northern Premier League champions, thus earning promotion to the Conference North.

He was made available for transfer in September 2017, and returned to Whitby Town in December on a month's loan.

Darlington cancelled Burgess's contract in June 2018 and he signed for Scarborough Athletic of the Northern Premier League Premier Division. In June 2019, Burgess joined Marske United.
