= Nathan Fisher =

English footballer

Personal information
- Full name: Nathan Daniel Fisher(Sylph)
- Date of birth: 6 July 1989 (age 37)
- Place of birth: Northallerton, England
- Height: 5 ft 10 in (1.78 m)
- Position: Striker

Team information
- Current team: Richmond Town FC

Youth career
- 2005–2007: Middlesbrough
- 2007–2008: Gretna

Senior career*
| Years | Team | Apps | (Gls) |
| 2008 | Gretna | 1 | (0) |
| 2008 | Durham City | 11 | (3) |
| 2008–2009 | Chester-le-Street Town | 15 | (4) |
| 2009 | Consett | 0 | (0) |
| 2009–2010 | Chester-le-Street Town | 39 | (34) |
| 2010–2013 | Gateshead | 83 | (12) |
| 2013–2014 | Darlington | 0 | (0) |
| 2014–2016 | Spennymoor Town F.C. | ? | (?) |
| 2017–2021 | West Auckland Town FC | ? | (?) |
| 2021– | Richmond Town FC | 0 | (0) |
- * Club domestic league appearances and goals as of 04:20, 17 November 2014 (UTC)

Nathan Daniel Fisher (born 6 July 1989) is a footballer

== Career ==
Fisher started his career at Middlesbrough, where he played in the youth academy from 2005 to 2007. He went on to play in Gretna's youth team and made his Scottish Premier League debut on 3 May 2008 in a 6–1 defeat to Inverness Caledonian Thistle, coming on as an 82nd-minute substitute. He was released by the club later that month when the club made their remaining 40 staff redundant. He joined York City on trial in July, where he played in a 6–0 pre-season friendly victory over Tadcaster Albion. However, York manager Colin Walker said he and two other trialists were only making up the numbers and were unlikely to be signed permanently. He later signed for Durham City, but was not a frequent player during their title winning season in the Northern Premier League Division One North. Fisher moved on to Northern League Division Two side Chester-le-Street Town where he scored 45 goals in 62 games in all competitions in two spells at the club. Fisher joined Consett at the beginning of the 2009–10 season, but rejoined Chester-le-Street Town after making only one appearance in a 5–0 loss against Newcastle Benfield in the J.R. Cleator Cup. On 17 June 2010, Fisher signed for Conference National side Gateshead for £30,000, making his debut as a second-half substitute against Kettering Town on 14 August 2010. Fisher scored his first goal for Gateshead on 23 October 2010 against Altrincham at Moss Lane in the FA Cup Fourth Qualifying Round. He agreed a new one-year contract with the club in May 2012 to cover the 2012–13 season. Fisher was one of seven players released by Gateshead at the end of April 2013. Fisher went on to play football in Thailand and on returning he signed for Darlington 1883 in September 2013, who then played their football in the First Division North of the Northern Premier League.

Fisher was transfer listed in August 2014 and later joined fellow Northern Premier League Division One North team Spennymoor Town.

He currently plays for West Auckland Town, however, it was reported on 13 August 2020 that he ruptured his Achilles tendon and was expected to be out for 6 months.

== Career statistics ==
As of 20 April 2013

| Club | Season | League^{[A]} | | FA Cup | | League Cup | | Other^{[B]} | | Total | |
| Club | Season | Apps | Goals | Apps | Goals | Apps | Goals | Apps | Goals | Apps | Goals |
|---|---|---|---|---|---|---|---|---|---|---|---|
| Gretna | 2007–08 | 1 | 0 | 0 | 0 | 0 | 0 | 0 | 0 | 1 | 0 |
| Durham City | 2008–09 | 11 | 3 | 0 | 0 | 0 | 0 | 0 | 0 | 11 | 3 |
| Chester-le-Street Town | 2008–09 | 15 | 4 | 0 | 0 | 0 | 0 | 0 | 0 | 15 | 4 |
| Consett | 2009–10 | 0 | 0 | 0 | 0 | 0 | 0 | 1 | 0 | 1 | 0 |
| Chester-le-Street Town | 2009–10 | 39 | 34 | 1 | 0 | 0 | 0 | 7 | 7 | 47 | 41 |
| Gateshead | 2010–11 | 40 | 9 | 2 | 1 | 0 | 0 | 6^{[C]} | 3^{[C]} | 48 | 13 |
| Gateshead | 2011–12 | 20 | 0 | 3 | 2 | 0 | 0 | 1^{[D]} | 0^{[D]} | 24 | 2 |
| Gateshead | 2012–13 | 23 | 3 | 1 | 0 | 0 | 0 | 2^{[E]} | 0^{[E]} | 26 | 3 |
| Gateshead | Total | 83 | 12 | 6 | 3 | 0 | 0 | 9 | 3 | 98 | 18 |
| Career totals | | 149 | 53 | 7 | 3 | 0 | 0 | 17 | 10 | 173 | 66 |

A. The "League" column constitutes appearances and goals (including those as a substitute) in the Scottish Premier League, Football Conference, Northern Premier League and Northern League.
B. The "Other" column constitutes appearances and goals (including those as a substitute) in the FA Trophy, FA Vase, Northern Premier League Challenge Cup, Durham Challenge Cup, J.R. Cleator Cup and play-offs.
C. Two appearances and four goals in Durham Challenge Cup for Gateshead Reserves (not included).
D. Two appearances and three goals in Durham Challenge Cup for Gateshead Reserves (not included).
E. Two appearances and three goals in Durham Challenge Cup for Gateshead Reserves (not included).
