= 2012–13 Middlesbrough F.C. season =

Middlesbrough
2012–13 season
- Chairman: Steve Gibson
- Manager: Tony Mowbray
- Stadium: Riverside
- Football League Championship: 16th
- FA Cup: Fifth round
- League Cup: Quarter-finals
- Top goalscorer: League: Scott McDonald (12); All: Scott McDonald (13)
- Highest home attendance: 28,229 (vs Sheffield Wednesday)
- Lowest home attendance: 12,579 (vs Hastings United)
- Average home league attendance: 17,587
Home colours	Away colours

The 2012–13 season was Middlesbrough's fourth consecutive season in the Championship. They also competed in the League Cup and the FA Cup.

== Results and fixtures ==
=== Preseason ===
22 July 2012	Falkirk	3–7	Middlesbrough	Falkirk Stadium
16:05GMT	Taylor 5', 39', 47' (pen.)	Report	Williams 15', 20'; Leadbitter 31'; Ledesma 53'; Bailey 56'; McDonald 78', 90'	Attendance: 1,621

27 July 2012	Middlesbrough	5–0	Tottenham Hotspur XI	Algarve, Portugal
18:00GMT	Bailey 28'; McDonald 67'; Main 68'; Park 71'; Halliday 90' (pen.)	Report		Attendance: N/A

31 July 2012	Hartlepool United	2–2	Middlesbrough	Victoria Park
19:30GMT	Sweeney 17'; Collins 80'	Report	McDonald 33'; Reach 35'	Attendance: 3,663 (1,916 Boro)

3 August 2012	Carlisle United	1–2	Middlesbrough	Brunton Park
TBA GMT	Miller 53'	Report	Main 29'; Park 65'	Attendance: 1,988

4 August 2012	York City	1–2	Middlesbrough	Bootham Crescent
15:00 GMT	Reed 71' (pen.)	Report	McDonald 23'; Zemmama	Attendance: 1,865 (645 Boro)

8 August 2012	Scunthorpe United	3–2	Middlesbrough	Glanford Park
19:30 GMT	Grella 45'; Walker 56'; Grant 80'	Report	Park 5'; Main 23' (pen.)	Attendance: 922 (149 Boro)

=== League Cup ===
11 August 2012 1	Bury	1–2	Middlesbrough	Gigg Lane
15:00 GMT	Hughes 63'	Report	Emnes 33'; Ledesma 61'	Attendance: 2,964 (1,121 Boro)

28 August 2012 2	Gillingham	0–2	Middlesbrough	Priestfield Stadium
19:45 GMT		Report	Carayol 23'; Park 90'	Attendance: 5,146 (463 Boro)

25 September 2012 3	Preston North End	1–3	Middlesbrough	Deepdale
19:45 GMT	King 39'	Report	Ledesma 13'; Zemmama 18'; Smallwood 62'	Attendance: 4,959

30 October 2012 4	Sunderland	0–1	Middlesbrough	Stadium of Light
19:45 GMT		Report	McDonald 39'	Attendance: 32,535 (2,781 Boro)

12 December 2012 5/QF	Swansea City	1–0	Middlesbrough	Liberty Stadium
19:45 GMT	Hines 80' (o.g.)	Report		Attendance: 15,048 (709 Boro)

=== FA Cup ===
6 January 2013 3	Middlesbrough	4–1	Hastings United	Riverside
15:00 GMT	Zemmama 21', 67'; Halliday 47'; Miller 84'	Report	Goldberg 68'	Attendance: 12,579

26 January 2013 4	Middlesbrough	2–1	Aldershot Town	Riverside
15:00 GMT	Jutkiewicz 83', 90+6'	Report	Hylton 86'	Attendance: 12,684

27 February 2013 5	Middlesbrough	0–2	Chelsea	Riverside
19:45 GMT		Report	Ramires 51'; Moses 73'	Attendance: 27,856

=== Championship ===
==== Results summary ====
Overall								Home						Away					
Pld	W	D	L	GF	GA	GD	Pts	W	D	L	GF	GA	GD	W	D	L	GF	GA	GD
46	18	5	23	61	70	−9	59	13	3	7	38	27	+11	5	2	16	23	43	−20

==== Results by matchday ====
Round	1	2	3	4	5	6	7	8	9	10	11	12	13	14	15	16	17	18	19	20	21	22	23	24	25	26	27	28	29	30	31	32	33	34	35	36	37	38	39	40	41	42	43	44	45	46
Ground	A	H	H	A	H	A	A	H	H	A	A	H	H	A	A	H	A	H	H	A	A	H	A	H	H	A	H	A	A	H	H	A	A	H	H	A	A	H	A	H	A	H	H	A	H	A
Result	L	W	W	L	W	L	W	L	D	W	W	W	W	W	D	W	L	L	W	L	W	W	L	W	W	L	L	L	L	L	W	L	D	L	W	L	L	L	L	D	L	L	W	L	D	L
Position	20	12	6	11	7	8	6	11	11	11	7	3	3	2	2	1	3	4	3	3	3	3	4	3	3	4	5	5	6	6	6	6	6	7	7	8	9	9	9	9	9	10	10	12	12	16

A = Away; H = Home; W = Win; D = Draw; L = Loss

==== Matches ====
18 August 2012 1	Barnsley	1–0	Middlesbrough	Oakwell
15:00 GMT	Davies 45'	Report		Attendance: 12,203 (3,872 Boro)

21 August 2012 2	Middlesbrough	3–2	Burnley	Riverside
19:45 GMT	Bailey 42'; Reach 78'; L.Williams 88'	Report	Austin 41'; Junior Stanislas 86'	Attendance: 15,559

25 August 2012 3	Middlesbrough	2–1	Crystal Palace	Riverside
15:00 GMT	Hines 41'; Zemmama 52'	Report	Easter 55' (pen.)	Attendance: 15,494

1 September 2012 4	Millwall	3–1	Middlesbrough	The Den
12:45 GMT	Keogh 34', 86'; Trotter 25'	Report	Emnes 42' (pen.)	Attendance: 9,576 (768 Boro)

15 September 2012 5	Middlesbrough	2–0	Ipswich Town	Riverside
15:00 GMT	L.Williams 34'; Carayol 90+3'	Report		Attendance: 14,887

18 September 2012 6	Blackpool	4–1	Middlesbrough	Bloomfield Road
19:45 GMT	Delfouneso 9', 35'; Ince 55'; Grandin 85' (pen.)	Report	Bikey 45+1'	Attendance: 12,736 (More than 500 Boro)

21 September 2012 7	Blackburn Rovers	1–2	Middlesbrough	Ewood Park
19:45 GMT	Hanley 89'	Report	Jutkiewicz 7', 60'	Attendance: 13,405 (765 Boro)

29 September 2012 8	Middlesbrough	1–2	Leicester City	Riverside
15:00 GMT	Bailey 48'	Report	Vardy 62'; Dyer 89'	Attendance: 15,679

3 October 2012 9	Middlesbrough	2–2	Derby County	Riverside
19:45 GMT	Jutkiewicz 18', 81'	Report	Robinson 15' (pen.); Coutts 89'	Attendance: 13,377

6 October 2012 10	Watford	1–2	Middlesbrough	Vicarage Road
15:00 GMT	Deeney 1'	Report	Emnes 30'; McDonald 77'	Attendance: 12,006 (935 Boro)

21 October 2012 11	Brighton & Hove Albion	0–1	Middlesbrough	Falmer Stadium
15:00 GMT		Report	Emnes 21'	Attendance: 26,293 (1,216 Boro)

23 October 2012 12	Middlesbrough	2–0	Hull City	Riverside
19:45 GMT	Haroun 59'; Miller 66'	Report		Attendance: 14,129

27 October 2012 13	Middlesbrough	2–1	Bolton Wanderers	Riverside
15:00 GMT	McDonald 66', 84'	Report	Lee 42'	Attendance: 16,200

3 November 2012 14	Charlton Athletic	1–4	Middlesbrough	The Valley
15:00 GMT	Hulse 12'	Report	Woodgate 27'; McDonald 53'; Ledesma 63'; Smallwood 90'	Attendance: 17,736 (1,686 Boro)

6 November 2012 15	Nottingham Forest	0–0	Middlesbrough	City Ground
19:45 GMT		Report		Attendance: 20,150 (1,617 Boro)

9 November 2012 16	Middlesbrough	3–1	Sheffield Wednesday	Riverside
19:45 GMT	Hoyte 13'; Miller 60'; Jutkiewicz 76'	Report	Madie 48'	Attendance: 28,229

17 November 2012 17	Cardiff City	1–0	Middlesbrough	Cardiff City Stadium
15:00 GMT	Connolly 18'	Report		Attendance: 21,578 (739 Boro)

24 November 2012 18	Middlesbrough	1–3	Bristol City	Riverside
15:00 GMT	Miller 34'	Report	Adomah 13'; Pearson 62'; Davies 88'	Attendance: 20,585

27 November 2012 19	Middlesbrough	3–0	Huddersfield Town	Riverside
19:45 GMT	McDonald 28', 85'; Ledesma 66'	Report		Attendance: 21,850

30 November 2012 20	Birmingham City	3–2	Middlesbrough	St Andrew's
19:45 GMT	King 45+2' (pen.), 81'; Elliott 66'	Report	Leadbitter 14'; McDonald 62'	Attendance: 15,332 (522 Boro)

8 December 2012 21	Peterborough United	2–3	Middlesbrough	London Road
15:00 GMT	Gayle 37', 51'	Report	Haroun 9', 20'; Miller 76'	Attendance: 6,612 (1,725 Boro)

15 December 2012 22	Middlesbrough	2–0	Wolverhampton Wandereres	Riverside
15:00 GMT	Emnes 87' (pen.); McDonald 90+3'	Report		Attendance: 15,662

22 December 2012 23	Leeds United	2–1	Middlesbrough	Elland Road
15:00 GMT	Luciano Becchio 44', 72'	Report	Jutkiewicz 29'

26 December 2012 24	Middlesbrough	1–0	Blackburn Rovers	Riverside
15:00 GMT	Jutkiewicz 67'	Report		Attendance: 22,882

29 December 2012 25	Middlesbrough	4–2	Blackpool	Riverside
15:00 GMT	Miller 14'; Smallwood 36'; McDonald 62'; Reach 88'	Report	Thomas 59'; Basham 76'	Attendance: 18,164

1 January 2013 26	Derby County	3–1	Middlesbrough	Pride Park
15:00 GMT	Jacobs 19'; Hendrick 42'; Sammon 64'	Report	Jutkiewicz 90+2'	Attendance: 22,523 (1,181 Boro)

12 January 2013 27	Middlesbrough	1–2	Watford	Riverside Stadium
15:00 GMT	McDonald 90'	Report	Vydra 45', 83'	Attendance: 17,499

18 January 2013 28	Leicester City	1–0	Middlesbrough	King Power Stadium
20:00 GMT	Nugent 70'	Report		Attendance: 8,585(400 Boro)

2 February 2013 29	Ipswich Town	4–0	Middlesbrough	Portman Road
15:00 GMT	Smith 38', 78'; McGoldrick 47'; McLean 56'	Report		Attendance: 16,389(685 Boro)

9 February 2013 30	Middlesbrough	2–3	Barnsley	Riverside Stadium
15:00 GMT	Carayol 49'; Main 62'	Report	O'Brien 6'; Golbourne 69'; Scotland 75'	Attendance: 15,034

12 February 2013 31	Middlesbrough	1–0	Leeds United	Riverside Stadium
19:45 GMT	Main 81'	Report		Attendance: 18,388

16 February 2013 32	Crystal Palace	4–1	Middlesbrough	Selhurst Park
15:00 GMT	Glenn Murray 8', 57'; Ramage 48'; Phillips 85'	Report	Faris Haroun 80'	Attendance: 17,213 (1,632 Boro)

19 February 2013 33	Burnley	0–0	Middlesbrough	Turf Moor
15:00 GMT		Report		Attendance: 12,398 (678 Boro)

23 February 2013 34	Middlesbrough	1–2	Millwall	Riverside Stadium
17:20 GMT	Main 75'	Report	George Friend 24' (o.g.); Woolford 39'	Attendance: 15,377

2 March 2013 35	Middlesbrough	2–1	Cardiff City	Riverside Stadium
15:00 GMT	Dyer 13'; Ameobi 17'	Report	Gunnarsson 67'	Attendance: 15,440

5 March 2013 36	Huddersfield Town	2–1	Middlesbrough	John Smith's Stadium
19:45 GMT	Lee 86'; Ward 90+2'		McDonald 78'	Attendance: 12,705

9 March 2013 37	Bristol City	2–0	Middlesbrough	Ashton Gate
15:00 GMT	Adomah 33'; Davies 53'	Report		Attendance: 13,524 (616 Boro)

16 March 2013 38	Middlesbrough	0–1	Birmingham City	Riverside Stadium
15:00 GMT		Report	Žigić 81'	Attendance: 14,348

30 March 2013 39	Wolverhampton Wanderers	3–2	Middlesbrough	Molineux Stadium
15:00 GMT	McManus 17' (o.g.); Sigurðarson 48'; Doyle 70'	Report	Leadbitter 25', 52'	Attendance: 21,277 (606 Boro)

2 April 2013 40	Middlesbrough	0–0	Peterborough United	Riverside Stadium
19:45 GMT		Report		Attendance: 13,683

6 April 2013 41	Hull City	1–0	Middlesbrough	KC Stadium
15:00 GMT	Brady 62'	Report		Attendance: 17,901 (1,086 Boro)

13 April 2013 42	Middlesbrough	0–2	Brighton & Hove Albion	Riverside Stadium
15:00 GMT		Report	Orlandi 59'; López 75'	Attendance: 14,925

16 April 2013 43	Middlesbrough	1–0	Nottingham Forest	Riverside Stadium
19:45 GMT	Carayol 42'	Report		Attendance: 13,861

20 April 2013 44	Bolton Wanderers	2–1	Middlesbrough	Reebok Stadium
15:00 GMT	Eagles 52'; Sordell 58' (pen.)	Report	Dyer 56'	Attendance: 18,425 (701 Boro)

27 April 2013 45	Middlesbrough	2–2	Charlton Athletic	Riverside Stadium
15:00 GMT	Emnes 76'; McDonald 86'	Report	Pritchard 1'; R.Williams 16' (o.g.)	Attendance: 15,011

4 May 2013 46	Sheffield Wednesday	2–0	Middlesbrough	Hillsborough Stadium
15:00 GMT	Howard 8'; Lita 30'	Report		Attendance: 17,901 (1,086 Boro)

== Players ==
=== Captains ===
No.	P	Name	Country	No. games	Notes
14	DF	R. Williams	(Australia)	25	Club captain
39	DF	Woodgate	(England)	14	
7	MF	Leadbitter	(England)	10	
10	MF	Bailey	(England)	4	

Last updated: June 2012
Source: Competitive match reports.
Competitive matches only
Matches started as captain only
Country: FIFA nationality; No.: Squad number; P: Position; Name: Player name; No. Games: Number of games started as captain.

== First team squad ==
No.	Name	Nationality	Position (s)	Date of Birth (Age)	Signed from
Goalkeepers
1	Jason Steele	(England)	GK	18 August 1990 (age 36)	(England) Middlesbrough Academy
31	Connor Ripley	(England)	GK	13 February 1993 (age 33)	(England) Middlesbrough Academy
32	Jayson Leutwiler	(Switzerland)	GK	25 April 1989 (age 37)	(Switzerland) Basel
Defenders
2	Justin Hoyte	(England)	DF	20 November 1984 (age 41)	(England) Arsenal
4	George Friend	(England)	DF	17 October 1987 (age 39)	(England) Doncaster Rovers
15	Seb Hines	(England)	DF	29 May 1988 (age 38)	(England) Middlesbrough Academy
21	Stuart Parnaby	(England)	DF	19 July 1982 (age 44)	(England) Birmingham City
25	Adam Reach	(England)	DF	3 February 1993 (age 33)	(England) Middlesbrough Academy
39	Jonathan Woodgate	(England)	DF	22 January 1980 (age 46)	(England) Stoke City
40	Ben Gibson	(England)	DF	1 March 1993 (age 33)	(England) Middlesbrough Academy
Midfielders
5	Merouane Zemmama	(Morocco)	MF	7 October 1983 (age 43)	(Scotland) Hibernian
7	Grant Leadbitter	(England)	MF	7 January 1986 (age 40)	(England) Ipswich Town
8	Sammy Ameobi	(England)	MF	1 May 1992 (age 34)	(England) Newcastle United
11	Emmanuel Ledesma	(Argentina)	MF	24 May 1988 (age 38)	(England) Walsall
14	Rhys Williams	(Australia)	MF	14 July 1988 (age 38)	(England) Middlesbrough Academy
18	Andy Halliday	(Scotland)	MF	11 October 1991 (age 35)	(Scotland) Livingston
19	Mustapha Carayol	(The Gambia)	MF	4 September 1988 (age 38)	(England) Bristol Rovers
24	Cameron Park	(Scotland)	MF	6 July 1992 (age 34)	(England) Middlesbrough Academy
33	Richard Smallwood	(England)	MF	29 December 1990 (age 35)	(England) Middlesbrough Academy
38	Faris Haroun	(Belgium)	MF	22 September 1985 (age 41)	(Belgium) Germinal Beerschot
Forwards
9	Marvin Emnes	(Netherlands)	FW	27 May 1988 (age 38)	(Netherlands) Sparta Rotterdam
17	Lukas Jutkiewicz	(England)	FW	28 March 1989 (age 37)	(England) Coventry City
22	Luke Williams	(England)	FW	11 June 1993 (age 33)	(England) Middlesbrough Academy
23	Curtis Main	(England)	FW	20 June 1992 (age 34)	(England) Darlington
27	Scott McDonald	(Australia)	FW	21 August 1983 (age 43)	(Scotland) Celtic

=== Squad ===
As of 21 November 2012

No.	Pos	Nat	Player	Total		Championship		FA Cup		League Cup	
No.	Pos	Nat	Player	Apps	Goals	Apps	Goals	Apps	Goals	Apps	Goals
1	GK	(England) ENG	Jason Steele	53	0	46	0	3	0	4	0
2	DF	(England) ENG	Justin Hoyte	34	1	29+2	1	0	0	3	0
3	DF	(Cameroon) CMR	Andre Bikey	37	1	32+1	1	2	0	2	0
4	DF	(England) ENG	George Friend	39	0	34	0	1	0	4	0
5	MF	(Morocco) MAR	Merouane Zemmama	22	4	4+13	1	1+2	2	1+1	1
6	DF	(Scotland) SCO	Stephen McManus	10	0	7	0	1	0	2	0
7	MF	(England) ENG	Grant Leadbitter	47	3	42	3	1+1	0	3	0
8	MF	(England) ENG	Sammy Ameobi	9	1	6+3	1	0	0	0	0
9	FW	(Netherlands) NED	Marvin Emnes	28	6	19+5	5	1	0	2+1	1
10	MF	(England) ENG	Nicky Bailey	35	2	19+9	2	3	0	4	0
11	MF	(Argentina) ARG	Emmanuel Ledesma	33	4	14+14	2	0+1	0	4	2
12	MF	(England) ENG	Kieron Dyer	9	2	7+2	2	0	0	0	0
14	MF	(Australia) AUS	Rhys Williams	28	0	21+2	0	3	0	2	0
15	DF	(England) ENG	Seb Hines	27	1	17+4	1	1+1	0	4	0
16	MF	(England) ENG	Josh McEachran	38	0	35+3	0	0	0	0	0
17	FW	(England) ENG	Lukas Jutkiewicz	26	10	18+6	8	1	2	1	0
18	MF	(Scotland) SCO	Andy Halliday	24	1	13+6	0	2+0	1	2+1	0
19	MF	(The Gambia) GAM	Mustapha Carayol	21	4	12+6	3	1	0	2	1
21	DF	(England) ENG	Stuart Parnaby	18	0	10+4	0	2	0	1+1	0
22	FW	(England) ENG	Luke Williams	14	2	3+8	2	1	0	1+1	0
23	FW	(England) ENG	Curtis Main	14	3	6+7	3	1	0	0	0
24	MF	(Scotland) SCO	Cameron Park	1	1	0	0	0	0	1	1
25	DF	(England) ENG	Adam Reach	20	2	9+7	2	2	0	0+2	0
26	MF	(England) ENG	Jordan Jones	1	0	0	0	0+1	0	0	0
27	FW	(Australia) AUS	Scott McDonald	35	13	25+7	12	1	0	2	1
29	DF	(England) ENG	Bryn Morris	2	0	0+1	0	0+1	0	0	0
30	FW	(England) ENG	Ishmael Miller	30	6	14+11	5	1+1	1	1+2	0
31	GK	(England) ENG	Connor Ripley	0	0	0	0	0	0	0	0
32	GK	(Switzerland) SUI	Jayson Leutwiler	1	0	0	0	0	0	1	0
33	MF	(England) ENG	Richard Smallwood	28	3	13+9	2	2	0	2+2	1
35	DF	(England) ENG	Christian Burgess	1	0	1	0	0	0	0	0
38	MF	(Belgium) BEL	Faris Haroun	29	4	20+3	4	1+1	0	2+2	0
39	DF	(England) ENG	Jonathan Woodgate	25	1	24	1	0	0	1	0
40	DF	(England) ENG	Ben Gibson	1	0	1	0	0	0	0	0
Players featured for club who have been sent out on loan:
Players featured for club who have left:
	MF	(Scotland) SCO	Kevin Thomson	12	0	5+4	0	1	0	1+1	0
	MF	(Argentina) ARG	Julio Arca	3	0	1	0	0	0	2	0

=== Disciplinary record ===
Name	Number	Position	Championship		FA Cup		League Cup		Total	
Name	Number	Position	Yellow card	Red card	Yellow card	Red card	Yellow card	Red card	Yellow card	Red card
(England) Grant Leadbitter	7	MF	10		1				11	
(Australia) Scott McDonald	27	FW	3				2		5	
(Argentina) Emmanuel Ledesma	11	MF	4						4	
(Cameroon) Andre Bikey	3	DF	4						4	
(Australia) Rhys Williams	14	DF	4						4	
(England) Jonathan Woodgate	39	DF	3						3	
(Scotland) Kevin Thomson	8	MF	2		1				3	
(England) Seb Hines	15	DF	2		1				3	
(England) Nicky Bailey	10	MF	2		1				3	
(England) Josh McEachran	16	MF	3						3	
(England) Jason Steele	1	GK	2						2	
(Belgium) Faris Haroun	38	MF	2						2	
(England) George Friend	4	DF	2						2	
(Scotland) Andy Halliday	18	DF	1		1				2	
(England) Curtis Main	23	FW		1						1
(England) Stuart Parnaby	21	DF	1						1	
(England) Adam Reach	25	MF	1						1	
(England) Ishmael Miller	30	FW	1						1	
(England) Lukas Jutkiewicz	17	FW	1						1	
(England) Justin Hoyte	2	DF	1						1	
(England) Josh McEachran	16	MF	1						1	
(The Gambia) Mustapha Carayol	19	MF	1						1	
(Morocco) Merouane Zemmama	5	MF	1						1	
(Scotland) Stephen McManus	6	DF			1				1	
(England) Richard Smallwood	33	MF					1		1	
(Switzerland) Jayson Leutwiler	32	GK					1		1	

==== Suspensions served ====
Date	Matches Missed	Player	Reason	Opponents Missed
25 November	1	Grant Leadbitter	5 x (yellow card)	Huddersfield (H)
9 February	1	Curtis Main	{{{1}}}	Crystal Palace (A)

Key: (H) = League Home, (A) = League Away, (FA) = FA Cup, (CC) = League Cup

=== Top scorers ===
Name	Championship	FA Cup	League Cup	Total
(Australia) Scott McDonald	10		1	11
(England) Lukas Jutkiewicz	8	2		10
(England) Ishmael Miller	5	1		6
(Netherlands) Marvin Emnes	4		1	5
(The Gambia) Mustapha Carayol	3		1	4
(Morocco) Merouane Zemmama	1	2	1	4
(Belgium) Faris Haroun	3			3
(Argentina) Emmanuel Ledesma	2		1	3
(England) Richard Smallwood	2		1	3
(England) Curtis Main	3			3
(England) Luke Williams	2			2
(England) Nicky Bailey	2			2
(England) Adam Reach	2			2
(England) Grant Leadbitter	1		1	2
(England) Jonathan Woodgate	1			1
(England) Justin Hoyte	1			1
(Cameroon) Andre Bikey	1			1
(England) Seb Hines	1			1
(Scotland) Andy Halliday		1		1
(Scotland) Cameron Park			1	1

==== Penalties ====
Date	Penalty Taker	Scored	Opponent	Competition
1 September	Marvin Emnes	Yes	Millwall	Championship
15 December	Marvin Emnes	Yes	Wolverhampton Wanderers	Championship
6 January	Ishmael Miller	No	Hastings United	FA Cup
18 January	Marvin Emnes	No	Leicester City	Championship

=== Contracts ===
No.	Pos.	Nat.	Name	Age	Status	Contract length	Expiry date	Source
15	DF	(England)	Seb Hines	24	Signed	3 years	July 2016	MFC
25	DF	(England)	Adam Reach	19	Signed	4 years	July 2016	MFC
23	FW	(England)	Curtis Main	20	Signed	3 years	July 2015	MFC
	DF	(England)	Ben Gibson	19	Signed	4 years	July 2016	MFC
18	DF	(Scotland)	Andy Halliday	21	Signed	2 years	June 2015	MFC

== Team statistics ==
=== League table ===
Pos	Team	Pld	W	D	L	GF	GA	GD	Pts
14	Ipswich Town	46	16	12	18	48	61	−13	60
15	Blackpool	46	14	17	15	62	63	−1	59
16	Middlesbrough	46	18	5	23	61	70	−9	59
17	Blackburn Rovers	46	14	16	16	55	62	−7	58
18	Sheffield Wednesday	46	16	10	20	53	61	−8	58

Updated to match(es) played on 4 May 2013. Source: BBC Sport
Rules for classification: 1) points; 2) goal difference; 3) number of goals scored.

== Transfers ==
=== Transfers in ===
Nationality	Player	From	Fee	Source
(England)	Grant Leadbitter	Unattached	Free	
(England)	Stuart Parnaby	Unattached	Free	
(England)	Christian Burgess	Unattached	Free	
(England)	Jonathan Woodgate	Unattached	Free	
(Argentina)	Emmanuel Ledesma	Unattached	Free	
(England)	George Friend	Doncaster Rovers	Undisclosed	
(The Gambia)	Mustapha Carayol	Bristol Rovers	Undisclosed	
(England)	Justin Hoyte	Unattached	Free	
(Switzerland)	Jayson Leutwiler	Unattached	Free	
(Cameroon)	Andre Bikey	Unattached	Free	
(England)	Kieron Dyer	Unattached	Free	

==== Loans in ====
Nationality	Player	From	End date	Source
(England)	Josh McEachran	Chelsea	30 June 2013	
(England)	Ishmael Miller	Nottingham Forest	30 June 2013	

=== Transfers out ===
Nationality	Player	To	Fee	Source
(Scotland)	Barry Robson	Vancouver Whitecaps	Free	
(England)	Jonathan Franks	Hartlepool United	Free	
(England)	Jonathan Grounds	Oldham Athletic	Free	
(England)	Tony McMahon	Sheffield United	Free	
(England)	Joe Bennett	Aston Villa	Undisclosed	
(Wales)	Danny Coyne	Sheffield United	Free	
(England)	Matthew Bates	Bristol City	Free	
(Nigeria)	Bartholomew Ogbeche	Free agent	Released	
(France)	Malaury Martin	Free agent	Released	
(Scotland)	Kevin Thomson	Free agent	Released	
(Argentina)	Julio Arca	Retired		
(Scotland)	Stephen McManus	Free agent	Released	
(England)	Nicky Bailey	Free agent	Released	
(Cameroon)	Andre Bikey	Free agent	Released	

==== Loans out ====
Nationality	Player	To	End date	Source
(England)	Ben Gibson	Tranmere Rovers	30 June 2013	
(England)	Charlie Wyke	Hartlepool United	9 January 2012	
(Scotland)	Stephen McManus	Bristol City	17 January 2012	

== Honours ==
Team of the Week
Date	Player(s)
17/18 September	Jason Steele, Andre Bikey
6/7 October	Grant Leadbitter
20/21 October	Jason Steele, Jonathan Woodgate
27/28 October	Scott McDonald
3/4 November	Jonathan Woodgate, Emmanuel Ledesma
11/12 December	Faris Haroun
15/16 December	Jason Steele
