= 2013–14 Middlesbrough F.C. season =

Middlesbrough
2013–14 season
- Chairman: Steve Gibson
- Manager: Tony Mowbray (until 21 October); Mark Venus (caretaker); Aitor Karanka (from 13 November)
- Stadium: Riverside
- Football League Championship: 12th
- FA Cup: Third round
- League Cup: First round
- Top goalscorer: League: Albert Adomah (12); All: Albert Adomah (12)
- Highest home attendance: 23,679 (vs. Bolton Wanderers, 30 November 2013)
- Lowest home attendance: 6,774 (vs. Accrington Stanley, 6 August 2013)
Home colours	Away colours

The 2013–14 season was Middlesbrough's fifth consecutive season in the Championship. They also competed in the League Cup which they were knocked out by Accrington Stanley in a 2–1 defeat and will also compete in the FA Cup. Following a poor run of form, the defeat to Barnsley saw Tony Mowbray's tenure at the club end on 21 October 2013. Following this announcement, his assistant manager Mark Venus took charge as caretaker manager. On 13 November, José Mourinho's former Real Madrid assistant Aitor Karanka signed a 2 1/2-year deal to become manager of Middlesbrough.

== League table ==
Pos	Team	Pld	W	D	L	GF	GA	GD	Pts
10	Bournemouth	46	18	12	16	67	66	+1	66
11	Nottingham Forest	46	16	17	13	67	64	+3	65
12	Middlesbrough	46	16	16	14	62	50	+12	64
13	Watford	46	15	15	16	74	64	+10	60
14	Bolton Wanderers	46	14	17	15	59	60	−1	59

Source: BBC Sport
Rules for classification: 1) points; 2) goal difference; 3) number of goals scored

== Results and fixtures ==
=== Preseason ===
17 July 2013	Morecambe	0–2	Middlesbrough	Globe Arena
		Report	Emnes 39'; McDonald 89'	Attendance: 870; Referee: J Simpson

20 July 2013	Hartlepool United	0–0	Middlesbrough	Victoria Park
		Report		Attendance: 2,307; Referee: Tony Harrington

23 July 2013	Rotherham United	2–3	Middlesbrough	New York Stadium
	O'Connor 17' (pen.); Revell 19'	Report	Gibson 15'; Haroun 40'; Jutkiewicz 61'	Attendance: 2,143; Referee: Howard Webb

27 July 2013	Middlesbrough	2–1	Bordeaux	Bank's Stadium
15:00GMT	Emnes 20', 48'	Report	Saivet 85'	Attendance: 3,953; Referee: Robert Madley

=== Championship ===
==== Results summary ====
Overall								Home						Away					
Pld	W	D	L	GF	GA	GD	Pts	W	D	L	GF	GA	GD	W	D	L	GF	GA	GD
46	16	16	14	62	50	+12	64	10	9	4	35	20	+15	6	7	10	27	30	−3

==== Results by matchday ====
Round	1	2	3	4	5	6	7	8	9	10	11	12	13	14	15	16	17	18	19	20	21	22	23	24	25	26	27	28	29	30	31	32	33	34	35	36	37	38	39	40	41	42	43	44	45	46
Ground	H	A	H	A	H	A	A	H	A	H	H	A	H	A	H	A	H	A	A	H	A	H	H	A	A	H	A	H	A	A	A	H	A	H	H	A	H	A	A	H	H	A	H	A	H	A
Result	L	W	D	D	D	L	D	D	L	D	W	L	W	L	D	L	W	L	D	L	W	W	W	D	W	W	L	D	D	D	L	D	L	W	D	D	L	D	W	W	W	W	L	L	W	W
Position	16	12	11	14	15	16	16	16	18	19	15	16	12	16	16	18	15	16	18	19	17	16	15	15	13	9	10	10	12	12	14	13	14	13	12	13	14	15	13	13	13	12	13	13	12	12

A = Away; H = Home; W = Win; D = Draw; L = Loss

==== Matches ====
3 August 2013 1	Middlesbrough	1–2	Leicester City	Riverside Stadium
15:00 GMT	St Ledger 35' (o.g.)	Report	Drinkwater 60'; Vardy 67'	Attendance: 17,223; Referee: Andrew Madley

10 August 2013 2	Charlton Athletic	0–1	Middlesbrough	The Valley
15:00 GMT		Report	Jutkiewicz 72'	Attendance: 14,882; Referee: Tierney

17 August 2013 3	Middlesbrough	1–1	Blackpool	Riverside Stadium
15:00 GMT	Emnes 90+4'	Report	Basham 83'	Attendance: 13,993; Referee: Trevor Kettle

25 August 2013 4	Wigan Athletic	2–2	Middlesbrough	DW Stadium
15:00 GMT	Holt 17' (pen.); Gómez 85'	Report	Friend 45'; Leadbitter 75'	Attendance: 14,333; Referee: David Coote

31 August 2013 5	Middlesbrough	1–1	Sheffield Wednesday	Riverside Stadium
15:00 GMT	Carayol 49'	Report	Antonio 35'	Attendance: 15,964; Referee: Sarginson

14 September 2013 6	Ipswich Town	3–1	Middlesbrough	Portman Road
15:00 GMT	McGoldrick 34', 90+1'; Chambers 57'	Report	Adomah 13'	Attendance: 15,276; Referee: Linington

17 September 2013 7	Nottingham Forest	2–2	Middlesbrough	City Ground
19:45 GMT	Derbyshire 69'; Henderson 79'	Report	Kamara 17'; Friend 55'	Attendance: 19,509; Referee: Phil Dowd

21 September 2013 8	Middlesbrough	3–3	Bournemouth	Riverside Stadium
15:00 GMT	Kamara 17'; Carayol 55'; Leadbitter 75'	Report	Pitman 4' (pen.), 12' (pen.); Woodgate 83' (o.g.)	Attendance: 13,617; Referee: Salisbury

28 September 2013 9	Queens Park Rangers	2–0	Middlesbrough	Loftus Road
15:00 GMT	Barton 4'; Austin 35' (pen.)	Report		Attendance: 17,081 (1,296 Boro); Referee: Darren Deadman

1 October 2013 10	Middlesbrough	1–1	Huddersfield Town	Riverside Stadium
19:45 GMT	Gibson 78'	Report	Vaughan 58'	Attendance: 12,793; Referee: Simpson

5 October 2013 11	Middlesbrough	4–1	Yeovil Town	Riverside Stadium
15:00 GMT	Leadbitter 8'; Adomah 23'; Butterfield 49'; Kamara 73'	Report	Davis 4'	Attendance: 13,181; Referee: Whitehouse

19 October 2013 12	Barnsley	3–2	Middlesbrough	Oakwell
15:00 GMT	McCourt 26'; O'Grady 41', 43' (pen.)	Report	Adomah 83', 84'	Attendance: 11,438 (2,221 Boro); Referee: Langford

25 October 2013 13	Middlesbrough	4–0	Doncaster Rovers	Riverside Stadium
19:45 GMT	Adomah 8', 35'; Kamara 67'; Ayala 82'	Report		Attendance: 21,882; Referee: Naylor

2 November 2013 14	Blackburn Rovers	1–0	Middlesbrough	Ewood Park
15:00 GMT	Lowe 76'	Report		Attendance: 16,645 (2,374 Boro); Referee: Boyeson

9 November 2013 15	Middlesbrough	2–2	Watford	Riverside Stadium
15:00 GMT	Adomah 23'; Ayala 90+2'	Report	Deeney 32'; Forestieri 73'	Attendance: 14,344; Referee: Tierney

23 November 2013 16	Leeds United	2–1	Middlesbrough	Elland Road
15:00 GMT	McCormack 35'; Pearce 57'		Carayol 52'	Attendance: 30,367; Referee: Gibbs

30 November 2013 17	Middlesbrough	1–0	Bolton Wanderers	Riverside Stadium
15:00 GMT	Leadbitter 81'			Attendance: 23,679; Referee: Brown

4 December 2013 18	Derby County	2–1	Middlesbrough	Pride Park Stadium
19:45	Martin 45'; Sammon 90'	Report	Whitehead 74'	Attendance: 24,631 (546 away fans); Referee: Andrew Madley

7 December 2013 19	Birmingham City	2–2	Middlesbrough	St Andrew's
15:00	Caddis 59' (pen.); Bartley 90'	Report	Carayol 22'; Ayala 80'	Attendance: 13,454; Referee: Darren Bond

14 December 2013 20	Middlesbrough	0–1	Brighton & Hove Albion	Riverside Stadium
15:00		Report	Upson 80'	Attendance: 13,635; Referee: Mark Haywood

21 December 2013 21	Millwall	0–2	Middlesbrough	The Den
15:00		Report	Ledesma 49'; Adomah 89'	Attendance: 11,078; Referee: James Linington

26 December 2013 22	Middlesbrough	1–0	Burnley	Riverside Stadium
15:00	Ledesma 24'	Report		Attendance: 20,689; Referee: Mark Clattenburg

29 December 2013 23	Middlesbrough	3–0	Reading	Riverside Stadium
15:00 GMT (UTC)	Adomah 12'; Leadbitter 36', 82' (pen.), (yellow card) 90'; Whitehead (yellow card) 74'; Emnes (yellow card) 75'	Report	Gorkšs (yellow card) 33' (yellow-red card) 52'; Pearce (yellow card) 81'; McAnuff (yellow card) 88'	Attendance: 16,001; Referee: Paul Tierney

1 January 2014 24	Bolton Wanderers	2–2	Middlesbrough	Reebok Stadium
15:00 GMT	Baptiste 29'; Eagles (yellow card) 61'; Ngog 90+1'; Eagles (yellow card) 61'	Report	Carayol 9'; Main 20'; Ayala (yellow card) 52'	Attendance: 17,410; Referee: Chris Sarginson

11 January 2014 25	Blackpool	0–2	Middlesbrough	Bloomfield Road
15:00	MacKenzie (yellow card) 68'; Robinson (yellow card) 75'	Report	Carayol (yellow card) 63', (goal) 84', 90'	Attendance: 14,421; Referee: Russell

18 January 2014 26	Middlesbrough	1–0	Charlton Athletic	Riverside Stadium
15:00	Ledesma 16'	Report		Attendance: 14,548; Referee: K. Stroud

25 January 2014 27	Leicester City	2–0	Middlesbrough	Riverside Stadium
15:00	Vardy 52'; De Laet 73'	Report	Ayala (yellow card) 72'	Attendance: 26,047; Referee: Steve Martin

28 January 2014 28	Middlesbrough	0–0	Wigan Athletic	Riverside Stadium
19:45 GMT	Varga (yellow card) 48'; Ledesma (yellow card) 87'	Report	Perch (yellow card) 54'; Watson (yellow card) 58'	Attendance: 13,258; Referee: Michael Naylor

1 February 2014 29	Doncaster Rovers	0–0	Middlesbrough	Keepmoat Stadium
15:00	Wellens (yellow card) 37'	Report	Whitehead (yellow card) 90+3'	Attendance: 11,440; Referee: Andy Davies

8 February 2014 30	Middlesbrough	0–0	Blackburn Rovers	Riverside Stadium
15:00	Chalobah (yellow card) 61'; Carayol (yellow card) 66'	Report		Attendance: 14,965; Referee: Stuart Attwell

15 February 2014 31	Watford	1–0	Middlesbrough	Riverside Stadium
15:00	Cassetti (yellow card) 37'; Deeney 50' (pen.); Diakité (red card) 52'; Forestieri (yellow card) 58'	Report	Gibson (yellow card) 35' (yellow-red card) 57'; Chalobah (yellow card) 58'	Attendance: 15,391; Referee: Oliver Langford

22 February 2014 32	Middlesbrough	0–0	Leeds United	Riverside Stadium
12:15	Leadbitter (yellow card) 39'	Report	Wootton (yellow card) 9'	Attendance: 20,424; Referee: Anthony Taylor

1 March 2014 33	Sheffield Wednesday	1–0	Middlesbrough	Hillsborough Stadium
15:00	Nuhiu 87' (pen.), (yellow card) 88'; Coke (yellow card) 90'	Report	Friend (yellow card) 42'; Whitehead (yellow card) 36' (yellow-red card) 86'	Attendance: 20,743; Referee: D'Urso

8 March 2014 34	Middlesbrough	2–0	Ipswich Town	Riverside Stadium
15:00	Graham 29', 45+2'; Ledesma (yellow card) 70'	Report	Hyam (yellow card) 52'; Chambers (yellow card) 71'	Attendance: 13,965; Referee: Iain Williamson

11 March 2014 35	Middlesbrough	1–1	Nottingham Forest	Riverside Stadium
19:45 BST	Carayol 53'	Report	(yellow card) 28' Mackie; 80' Henderson	Attendance: 14,134; Referee: Roger East

15 March 2014 36	Bournemouth	0–0	Middlesbrough	Dean Court
15:00 GMT	O'Kane (yellow card) 73'	Report	Leadbitter (yellow card) 19'; Whitehead (yellow card) 41'; Omeruo (yellow card) 90+7'	Attendance: 9,710; Referee: Fred Graham

22 March 2014 37	Middlesbrough	1–3	Queens Park Rangers	Riverside Stadium
15:00 GMT	Friend 18'; Chalobah (yellow card) 66'; Friend (yellow card) 72'; Kamara (yellow card) 75'	Report	Carroll (yellow card) 23'; Kranjčar (yellow card) 32'; Benayoun 45+1'; Morrison (yellow card) 75'; Barton (yellow card) 76'; O'Neil (yellow card) 90+2'; Zamora 90+4'; Morrison 90+6'	Attendance: 15,075; Referee: Keith Hill

25 March 2014 38	Huddersfield Town	2–2	Middlesbrough	John Smith's Stadium
19:45	Hammill 3'; Wells 34'; Dixon (yellow card) 42'	Report	Adomah 10', 47'; Ledesma (yellow card) 62'; Varga (yellow card) 64'; Friend (yellow card) 84'	Attendance: 11,999; Referee: James Linington

29 March 2014 39	Brighton & Hove Albion	0–2	Middlesbrough	Falmer Stadium
15:00		Report	Adomah 65'; Graham 86'	Attendance: 27,486 (932 Boro); Referee: James Linington

5 April 2014 40	Middlesbrough	1–0	Derby County	Riverside Stadium
15:00	Chalobah 69'	Report		Attendance: 15,234; Referee: Andy Haines

8 April 2014 41	Middlesbrough	3–1	Birmingham City	Riverside Stadium
19:45	Graham 28'; Butterfield 29'; Tomlin 89'	Report	Huws 36'	Attendance: 13,399; Referee: Carl Boyeson

12 April 2014 42	Burnley	0–1	Middlesbrough	Turf Moor
15:00		Report	Butterfield 50'	Referee: Dean Whitestone

19 April 2014 43	Middlesbrough	1–2	Millwall	Riverside Stadium
15:00	Ledesma 80'	Report	Maierhofer 15', 30'	Attendance: 15,342; Referee: Darren Bond

22 April 2014 44	Reading	2–0	Middlesbrough	Madjeski Stadium
20:00	Le Fondre 9'; Friend 14' (o.g.)	Report		Attendance: 17,228 (659 Boro); Referee: James Adcock

26 April 2014 45	Middlesbrough	3–1	Barnsley	Riverside Stadium
15:00	Tomlin 54', 90+3'; Graham 90'	Report	Mvoto 53'	Attendance: 14,867; Referee: Darren Drysdale

3 May 2014 46	Yeovil Town	1–4	Middlesbrough	Huish Park
12:15	Hayter 38'	Report	Graham 31'; Ledesma 40', 47'; Tomlin 43'	Attendance: 6,477 (1,348 Boro); Referee: Graham Salisbury

=== League Cup ===
6 August 2013 First round	Middlesbrough	1–2	Accrington Stanley	Riverside Stadium
19:45 GMT	Jutkiewicz 9'	Report	Carver 40'; Mingoia 81'	Attendance: 6,774; Referee: Scott Duncan

=== FA Cup ===
4 January 2014 Third round	Middlesbrough	0–2	Hull City	Riverside Stadium
15:00 GMT	Williams (yellow card) 24'; Leadbitter (yellow card) 83'	Report	McLean 10'; Proschwitz 61'	Attendance: 15,571; Referee: Kevin Friend

== Players ==
=== Appearances and goals ===
As of 3 May 2014

No.	Pos	Nat	Player	Total		Championship		FA Cup		League Cup	
No.	Pos	Nat	Player	Apps	Goals	Apps	Goals	Apps	Goals	Apps	Goals
1	GK	(England) ENG	Jason Steele	16	0	16	0	0	0	0	0
3	DF	(England) ENG	George Friend	43	3	39+2	3	1	0	1	0
4	MF	(Australia) AUS	Rhys Williams	24	0	21+1	0	1	0	1	0
6	MF	(England) ENG	Jacob Butterfield	31	3	19+11	3	0+1	0	0	0
7	MF	(England) ENG	Grant Leadbitter	41	6	37+2	6	1	0	1	0
8	MF	(Hungary) HUN	József Varga (on loan from Debrecen)	36	0	29+5	0	1	0	1	0
9	FW	(England) ENG	Danny Graham (on loan from Sunderland)	18	6	17+1	6	0	0	0	0
10	FW	(England) ENG	Lee Tomlin	13	4	8+5	4	0	0	0	0
11	MF	(Argentina) ARG	Emmanuel Ledesma	29	6	16+11	6	1	0	1	0
13	GK	(Greece) GRE	Dimitrios Konstantopoulos	13	0	12	0	1	0	0	0
14	FW	(England) ENG	Luke Williams	11	0	4+5	0	1	0	0+1	0
15	DF	(England) ENG	Seb Hines	4	0	3+1	0	0	0	0	0
18	MF	(England) ENG	Dean Whitehead	38	1	34+3	1	1	0	0	0
19	MF	(The Gambia) GAM	Mustapha Carayol	33	8	24+8	8	0	0	1	0
20	DF	(England) ENG	Adam Reach	2	0	1+1	0	0	0	0	0
21	DF	(England) ENG	Stuart Parnaby	3	0	1+2	0	0	0	0	0
22	DF	(England) ENG	Ben Gibson	32	1	25+5	1	1	0	1	0
23	FW	(England) ENG	Curtis Main	25	1	7+16	1	1	0	0+1	0
24	DF	(England) ENG	Nathaniel Chalobah (on loan from Chelsea)	19	1	15+4	1	0	0	0	0
25	DF	(Nigeria) NGR	Kenneth Omeruo (on loan from Chelsea)	15	0	15	0	0	0	0	0
26	DF	(Spain) ESP	Daniel Ayala	18	3	16+2	3	0	0	0	0
27	MF	(Ghana) GHA	Albert Adomah	43	12	38+4	12	0+1	0	0	0
28	FW	(England) ENG	Bryn Morris	1	0	0+1	0	0	0	0	0
29	FW	(Sierra Leone) SLE	Kei Kamara	25	3	16+9	3	0	0	0	0
32	GK	(Switzerland) SUI	Jayson Leutwiler	4	0	1+2	0	0	0	1	0
33	GK	(Spain) ESP	Tomás Mejías (on loan from Real Madrid)	1	0	1	0	0	0	0	0
39	DF	(England) ENG	Jonathan Woodgate	25	0	24+1	0	0	0	0	0
Players away from the club on loan:
5	DF	(England) ENG	Frazer Richardson	11	0	11	0	0	0	0	0
9	FW	(England) ENG	Lukas Jutkiewicz	24	2	12+10	1	0+1	0	1	1
10	FW	(Netherlands) NED	Marvin Emnes	24	1	14+8	1	1	0	1	0
16	MF	(Scotland) SCO	Andy Halliday	4	0	0+4	0	0	0	0	0
17	MF	(Scotland) SCO	Cameron Park	0	0	0	0	0	0	0	0
31	GK	(England) ENG	Connor Ripley	0	0	0	0	0	0	0	0
33	MF	(England) ENG	Richard Smallwood	13	0	9+4	0	0	0	0	0
35	DF	(England) ENG	Christian Burgess	0	0	0	0	0	0	0	0
Players who appeared for Middlesbrough but left during the season:
2	DF	(Trinidad and Tobago) TTO	Justin Hoyte	4	0	1+2	0	0	0	1	0
12	GK	(Republic of Ireland) IRL	Shay Given (on loan from Aston Villa)	16	0	16	0	0	0	0	0
38	MF	(Belgium) BEL	Faris Haroun	1	0	0+1	0	0	0	0	0

=== First team coaches and staff ===
Position	Staff
Manager	(Spain) Aitor Karanka
Assistant Manager	(England) Craig Hignett
Senior Professional Development Phase Coach	(England) Jamie Clapham
Goalkeeper Coach	(Uruguay) Leo Percovich
Fitness Coach	(Portugal) Carlos Cachada
Fitness Coach	(England) Adam Kerr
Technical Analyst	(Spain) Javier Egido
Academy Manager	(England) Dave Parnaby
Europe Scout	(England) Gary Gill

Last updated: 12 April 2014

=== Transfers ===
As of 5 November 2013

==== In ====
#	Position:	Player	Transferred from	Fee	Date	Team	Source
16	MF	(England) Dean Whitehead	(England) Stoke City	Free transfer (Released)	2 July 2013	First team	
5	DF	(England) Frazer Richardson	(England) Southampton	Free transfer (Released)	2 August 2013	First team	
27	MF	(Ghana) Albert Adomah	(England) Bristol City	£1 million (approximately)	8 August 2013	First team	
13	GK	(Greece) Dimitrios Konstantopoulos	(Greece) AEK Athens	Free transfer (Released)	16 August 2013	First team	
29	ST	(Sierra Leone) Kei Kamara	(United States) Sporting Kansas City	Undisclosed (rumoured £900,000)	2 September 2013	First team	
6	MF	(England) Jacob Butterfield	(England) Norwich City	Undisclosed	2 September 2013	First team	
26	DF	(Spain) Daniel Ayala	(England) Norwich City	Undisclosed (rumoured £350,000)	24 January 2014	First team	
10	FW	(England) Lee Tomlin	(England) Peterborough United	Undisclosed	18 February 2014	First team	

==== Out ====
#	Position	Player	Transferred to	Fee	Date	Team	Source
27	FW	(Australia) Scott McDonald	(England) Millwall	Free transfer (Released)	23 July 2013	First Team	
2	DF	(Trinidad and Tobago) Justin Hoyte	(England) Millwall	Free transfer (Released)	2 January 2014	First Team	
38	MF	(Belgium) Faris Haroun	(England) Blackpool	Free transfer (Released)	31 January 2014	First Team	

==== Loan In ====
Squad #	Position	Player	Loaned from	Date	Loan expires	Team	Source
8	MF	(Hungary) József Varga	(Hungary) Debrecen	1 July 2013	End of Season	First team	
26	DF	(Spain) Daniel Ayala	(England) Norwich City	23 October 2013	End of Season	First team	
12	GK	(Republic of Ireland) Shay Given	(England) Aston Villa	28 November 2013	22 February 2014	First team	
25	DF	(England) Kenneth Omeruo	(England) Chelsea	7 January 2014	End of Season	First team	
24	MF	(England) Nathaniel Chalobah	(England) Chelsea	16 January 2014	End of Season	First team	
9	FW	(England) Danny Graham	(England) Sunderland	31 January 2014	End of Season	First team	
10	FW	(England) Lee Tomlin	(England) Peterborough United	31 January 2014	End of Season	First team	
35	GK	(Spain) Tomás Mejías	(Spain) Real Madrid	12 February 2014	End of Season	First team	

==== Loan out ====
#	Position	Player	Loaned to	Date	Loan expires	Team	Source
35	DF	(England) Christian Burgess	(England) Hartlepool United	2 August 2013	End of Season	First team	
31	GK	(England) Connor Ripley	(England) Bradford City	3 August 2013	31 December 2013	First team	
20	MF	(England) Adam Reach	(England) Shrewsbury Town	16 August 2013	1 January 2014	First team	
-	MF	(England) Matthew Dolan	(England) Hartlepool United	21 August 2013	18 September 2013	Reserves & Academy	
23	ST	(England) Curtis Main	(England) Shrewsbury Town	30 August 2013	28 September 2013	First team	
-	MF	(Northern Ireland) Ryan Brobbel	(England) York City	30 August 2013	End of Season	Reserves & Academy	
2	DF	(Trinidad and Tobago) Justin Hoyte	(England) Millwall Town	5 November 2013	1 January 2014	First team	
	FW	(England) Charlie Wyke	(England) Wimbledon	3 January 2014	4 April 2014	First team	
20	DF	(England) Adam Reach	(England) Bradford City	23 January 2014	21 April 2014	First team	
14	FW	(England) Luke Williams	(England) Hartlepool United	23 January 2014	23 February 2014	First team	
33	MF	(England) Richard Smallwood	(England) Rotherham United	23 January 2014	End of Season	First team	
16	MF	(Scotland) Andy Halliday	(England) Blackpool	24 January 2014	End of Season	First team	
5	DF	(England) Frazer Richardson	(England) Ipswich Town	25 January 2014	End of Season	First team	
9	FW	(England) Lukas Jutkiewicz	(England) Bolton Wanderers	28 January 2014	End of Season	First team	
10	FW	(Netherlands) Marvin Emnes	(England) Swansea City	31 January 2014	End of Season	First team	
-	MF	(England) Matthew Dolan	(England) Hartlepool United	8 February 2014	End of Season	Reserves & Academy	
31	GK	(England) Connor Ripley	(Sweden) Ostersunds FK	3 March 2014	End of Season	First team	
17	MF	(Scotland) Cameron Park	(England) Crewe Alexandra	27 February 2014	31 March 2014	First team	
