= 2014–15 Middlesbrough F.C. season =

Middlesbrough
2014–15 season
- Chairman: Steve Gibson
- Manager: Aitor Karanka
- Stadium: Riverside Stadium
- Football League Championship: 4th
- FA Cup: Fifth round
- League Cup: Third round
- Top goalscorer: League: Patrick Bamford (17); All: Patrick Bamford (19)
- Highest home attendance: 33,381 (vs. Brighton & Hove Albion, 02 May 2015)
- Lowest home attendance: 10,727 (vs. Preston North End, 26 August 2014)
Home colours	Away colours	Third colours

The 2014–15 season was Middlesbrough's 6th consecutive season in the Championship. They also competed in the League Cup and in the FA Cup.

== Statistics ==
=== Appearances and goals ===
Last updated 2 May 2015
"+" constitutes substitute appearances

No.	Pos	Nat	Player	Total		Championship		FA Cup		League Cup	
No.	Pos	Nat	Player	Apps	Goals	Apps	Goals	Apps	Goals	Apps	Goals
2	DF	(Spain) ESP	Damià	7	0	6	0	0	0	1	0
3	DF	(England) ENG	George Friend	46	1	42	1	3	0	1	0
4	DF	(Spain) ESP	Daniel Ayala	35	5	29+1	4	2	1	3	0
5	DF	(England) ENG	Ryan Fredericks (on loan from Tottenham Hotspur)	20	0	16+1	0	2	0	1	0
6	DF	(England) ENG	Ben Gibson	40	0	33+3	0	3	0	1	0
7	MF	(England) ENG	Grant Leadbitter	49	13	40+3	12	3+1	0	2	1
8	MF	(England) ENG	Adam Clayton	47	0	37+4	0	4	0	2	0
9	FW	(Spain) ESP	Kike	49	11	25+17	9	3+1	1	1+2	1
10	MF	(England) ENG	Lee Tomlin	48	9	32+10	7	4	0	2	2
11	MF	(Argentina) ARG	Emmanuel Ledesma	2	0	1	0	0	0	0+1	0
13	GK	(Greece) GRE	Dimitrios Konstantopoulos	42	0	40	0	0	0	2	0
17	DF	(England) ENG	James Husband	6	0	2+1	0	1	0	2	0
18	MF	(England) ENG	Dean Whitehead	20	0	11+7	0	0	0	2	0
19	MF	(The Gambia) GAM	Mustapha Carayol	0	0	0	0	0	0	0	0
20	MF	(England) ENG	Adam Reach	46	3	27+12	2	0+4	0	2+1	1
21	FW	(Belgium) BEL	Jelle Vossen (on loan from Racing Genk)	38	8	20+13	7	2+2	1	0+1	0
22	DF	(Nigeria) NGR	Kenneth Omeruo (on loan from Chelsea)	23	0	17+2	0	3	0	1	0
23	FW	(England) ENG	Patrick Bamford (on loan from Chelsea)	43	19	32+6	17	4	1	0+1	1
24	MF	(Equatorial Guinea) GEQ	Emilio Nsue	28	0	12+14	0	0	0	2	0
25	DF	(Australia) AUS	Rhys Williams	2	0	0+1	0	1	0	0	0
26	DF	(Czech Republic) CZE	Tomáš Kalas (on loan from Chelsea)	17	0	16+1	0	0	0	0	0
27	MF	(Ghana) GHA	Albert Adomah	49	5	40+3	5	3	0	2+1	0
33	MF	(Netherlands) NED	Yanic Wildschut	13	2	3+8	2	0+1	0	0+1	0
34	MF	(England) ENG	Adam Forshaw	20	1	6+12	0	0	0	2	1
39	DF	(England) ENG	Jonathan Woodgate	8	1	5+2	1	0	0	1	0
40	GK	(Spain) ESP	Tomás Mejías	11	0	6+1	0	4	0	0	0
Players away from the club on loan:
14	FW	(England) ENG	Luke Williams	5	1	0+4	0	0	0	1	1
15	DF	(England) ENG	Seb Hines	5	0	3	0	0	0	2	0
30	FW	(England) ENG	Bradley Fewster	2	1	0	0	0	0	2	1
Players who appeared for Middlesbrough but left during the season:
16	DF	(Scotland) SCO	Andy Halliday	0	0	0	0	0	0	0	0
29	MF	(Serbia) SRB	Miloš Veljković (on loan from Tottenham Hotspur)	4	0	1+2	0	0+1	0	0	0
33	MF	(England) ENG	Richard Smallwood	1	0	0	0	0	0	0+1	0
46	GK	(England) ENG	Jamal Blackman (on loan from Chelsea)	1	0	0	0	0	0	1	0

=== Top scorers ===
Last updated 17 April 2015

Rank	Pos.	No.	Name	Championship	FA Cup	League Cup	Total
1	FW	23	(England) Patrick Bamford	17	1	1	19
2	MF	7	(England) Grant Leadbitter	12	0	1	13
3	FW	9	(Spain) Kike	9	1	1	11
4	FW	10	(England) Lee Tomlin	7	0	2	9
5	FW	21	(Belgium) Jelle Vossen	7	1	0	8
6=	MF	27	(Ghana) Albert Adomah	5	0	0	5
6=	DF	4	(Spain) Daniel Ayala	4	1	0	5
7	MF	20	(England) Adam Reach	2	0	1	3
8	MF	33	(Netherlands) Yanic Wildschut	2	0	0	2
9=	DF	3	(England) George Friend	1	0	0	1
9=	FW	14	(England) Luke Williams	0	0	1	1
9=	FW	30	(England) Bradley Fewster	0	0	1	1
9=	DF	39	(England) Jonathan Woodgate	1	0	0	1
9=			Own goal	1	0	0	1

=== Disciplinary record ===
Number	Nation	Position	Name	Total		Championship		FA Cup		League Cup	
Number	Nation	Position	Name	Yellow card	Red card	Yellow card	Red card	Yellow card	Red card	Yellow card	Red card
4	DF	(Spain) ESP	Daniel Ayala	10	0	8	0	1	0	1	0
7	MF	(England) ENG	Grant Leadbitter	8	0	8	0	0	0	0	0
8	MF	(England) ENG	Adam Clayton	7	1	6	0	0	1	1	0
3	DF	(England) ENG	George Friend	6	1	6	1	0	0	0	0
5	DF	(England) ENG	Ryan Fredericks	5	0	5	0	0	0	0	0
10	MF	(England) ENG	Lee Tomlin	5	0	5	0	0	0	0	0
27	MF	(Ghana) GHA	Albert Adomah	5	1	4	1	0	0	1	0
6	DF	(England) ENG	Ben Gibson	4	0	4	0	0	0	0	0
18	MF	(England) ENG	Dean Whitehead	4	1	3	1	1	0	0	0
3	DF	(Nigeria) NGR	Kenneth Omeruo	4	0	3	0	0	0	1	0
23	FW	(England) ENG	Patrick Bamford	3	0	3	0	0	0	0	0
21	FW	(Belgium) BEL	Jelle Vossen	3	0	2	0	1	0	0	0
2	DF	(Spain) ESP	Damià	2	0	2	0	0	0	0	0
9	FW	(Spain) ESP	Kike	2	0	2	0	0	0	0	0
13	GK	(Greece) GRE	Dimitrios Konstantopoulos	0	1	0	1	0	0	0	0
24	MF	(Equatorial Guinea) GEQ	Emilio Nsue	1	0	1	0	0	0	0	0
34	MF	(England) ENG	Adam Forshaw	1	0	1	0	0	0	0	0
20	MF	(England) ENG	Adam Reach	1	0	0	0	0	0	1	0

== Competitions ==
=== Pre-season and friendlies ===
12 July 2014	Middlesbrough	4–1	ASA Târgu Mureș	Leeds, England
17:00 BST	L. Williams 18', 41'; Burgess 54'; Fewster 81'	Report	Amauri 61'	Stadium: West Riding County FA Ground

16 July 2014	Lucena	1–0	Middlesbrough	Lucena, Spain
17:00 BST	López 38'	Report		Stadium: Ciudad Deportiva

19 July 2014	Linense	0–4	Middlesbrough	Andalusia, Spain
10:00 BST		Report	Tomlin 29' (pen.); Fewster 54'; L. Williams 85'; Leadbitter 87'	Stadium: Municipal La Línea

21 July 2014	Atlético CP	0–5	Middlesbrough	Lisbon, Portugal
10:30 CET		Report	Kike 8', 15'; Friend 14'; Fewster 74' (pen.), 84'	Stadium: Estádio Da Tapadinha

26 July 2014	Rochdale	1–3	Middlesbrough	Rochdale, England
15:00 BST	Henderson 41'	Report	Reach 4'; Kike 15' (pen.); Tomlin 44' (pen.)	Stadium: Spotland Stadium; Attendance: 1,394; Referee: David Benton

30 July 2014	Hartlepool United	0–2	Middlesbrough	Hartlepool, England
19:30 BST		Report	Reach 50'; Fewster 70'	Stadium: Victoria Park; Attendance: 4,015; Referee: Tony Harrington

2 August 2014	Middlesbrough	0–2	Villarreal CF	Middlesbrough, England
15:00 BST		Report	Gerard Moreno 23'; Nahuel 45'	Stadium: Riverside Stadium; Attendance: 6,380; Referee: Mark Clattenburg

=== Championship ===
==== League table ====
Pos	Team	Pld	W	D	L	GF	GA	GD	Pts	Promotion, qualification or relegation
2	Watford (P)	46	27	8	11	91	50	+41	89	Promotion to the Premier League
3	Norwich City (O, P)	46	25	11	10	88	48	+40	86	Qualification for Championship play-offs
4	Middlesbrough	46	25	10	11	68	37	+31	85	Qualification for Championship play-offs
5	Brentford	46	23	9	14	78	59	+19	78	Qualification for Championship play-offs
6	Ipswich Town	46	22	12	12	72	54	+18	78	Qualification for Championship play-offs

Updated to match(es) played on 2 May 2015. Source: Sky Sports
Rules for classification: 1) Points; 2) Goal difference; 3) Number of goals scored
(O) Play-off winners; (P) Promoted

=== League results summary ===
Overall								Home						Away					
Pld	W	D	L	GF	GA	GD	Pts	W	D	L	GF	GA	GD	W	D	L	GF	GA	GD
46	25	10	11	68	37	+31	85	15	5	3	42	12	+30	10	5	8	26	25	+1

Last updated: 6 April 2015.
Source: Football League

==== Matches ====
Round	1	2	3	4	5	6	7	8	9	10	11	12	13	14	15	16	17	18	19	20	21	22	23	24	25	26	27	28	29	30	31	32	33	34	35	36	37	38	39	40	41	42	43	44	45	46
Ground	H	A	A	H	H	A	A	H	A	H	H	A	A	H	A	H	H	A	H	A	H	A	H	A	A	H	H	A	H	A	A	H	H	A	H	A	H	A	A	H	A	H	H	A	A	H
Result	W	L	W	L	L	W	W	W	D	D	W	W	L	D	W	W	D	D	D	W	W	L	W	D	D	W	W	W	W	W	D	L	W	L	W	L	W	W	L	W	L	W	W	W	L	D
Position	3	11	8	12	16	10	8	5	7	8	5	3	3	5	3	2	3	3	5	4	2	4	4	3	4	4	2	3	3	1	1	2	2	2	1	4	3	2	3	1	4	4	3	1	3	4

A = Away; H = Home; W = Win; D = Draw; L = Loss

The fixtures for the 2014–15 season were announced on 18 June 2014 at 9am.

9 August 2014 1	Middlesbrough	2–0	Birmingham City	Middlesbrough
15:00	Ayala 33' (yellow card) 61'; Kike 66'	Report	Eardley (yellow card) 54'	Stadium: Riverside Stadium; Attendance: 18,371; Referee: Graham Salisbury

16 August 2014 2	Leeds United	1–0	Middlesbrough	Leeds
12:15	Sharp 88'	Report		Stadium: Elland Road; Attendance: 24,484 (Approx 1,945 Boro); Referee: Stuart Attwell

19 August 2014 3	Bolton Wanderers	1–2	Middlesbrough	Bolton
19:00	Davies 27' (pen.)	Report	Leadbitter 45' (pen.); Kike 77'	Stadium: Macron Stadium; Attendance: 13,847; Referee: Stephen Martin

23 August 2014 4	Middlesbrough	2–3	Sheffield Wednesday	Middlesbrough
15:00	Leadbitter 72' (pen.), 90+2' (pen.)	Report	Nuhiu 6', 57'; May 42'	Stadium: Riverside Stadium; Attendance: 17,820 (1,848 Wednesday); Referee: Phil Dowd

30 August 2014 5	Middlesbrough	0–1	Reading	Middlesbrough
15:00		Report	Cox 7'	Stadium: Riverside Stadium; Attendance: 14,970; Referee: Darren Bond

13 September 2014 6	Huddersfield Town	1–2	Middlesbrough	Huddersfield
15:00	Stead 86'	Report	Leadbitter 36', 90+2' (pen.)	Stadium: John Smith's Stadium; Attendance: 17,993 (3500 Boro); Referee: Kevin Wright

16 September 2014 7	Cardiff City	0–1	Middlesbrough	Cardiff
19:45		Report	Kike 2'	Stadium: Cardiff City Stadium; Attendance: 19,711; Referee: Graham Scott

20 September 2014 8	Middlesbrough	4–0	Brentford	Middlesbrough
15:00	Leadbitter 35'; Adomah 50'; Bamford 68'; Kike 88'	Report		Stadium: Riverside Stadium; Attendance: 15,484; Referee: Jeremy Simpson

27 September 2014 9	Charlton Athletic	0–0	Middlesbrough	Charlton, London
15:00	Ben Haim (yellow card) 39'; Solly (yellow card) 74'	Report	Adomah (yellow card) 75' (yellow-red card) 82'	Stadium: The Valley; Attendance: 16,110 (1,967 Boro); Referee: Gavin Ward

30 September 2014 10	Middlesbrough	1–1	Blackpool	Middlesbrough
19:45	Ayala 19' (yellow card) 45+1'; Leadbitter (yellow card) 41'	Report	Miller 25'; Rentmeister (yellow card) 59'; Perkins (yellow card) 60'	Stadium: Riverside Stadium; Attendance: 15,213 (193 Blackpool); Referee: Paul Tierney

4 October 2014 11	Middlesbrough	2–0	Fulham	Middlesbrough
15:00	Reach 46'; Adomah 82'	Report		Stadium: Riverside Stadium; Attendance: 16,201; Referee: Darren Drysdale

18 October 2014 12	Brighton & Hove Albion	1–2	Middlesbrough	Brighton
15:00	Greer 88'	Report	Tomlin 8'; Adomah 53'	Stadium: Falmer Stadium; Attendance: 26,642 (1,376 Boro); Referee: Andy D'Urso

21 October 2014 13	Wolverhampton Wanderers	2–0	Middlesbrough	Wolverhampton
19:45	Sako 33' (pen.); Dicko 73'; Ebanks-Landell (yellow card) 90+1'; Clarke (yellow card) 90+4'	Report	Leadbitter (yellow card) 83'	Stadium: Molineux Stadium; Attendance: 18,391; Referee: Carl Berry

25 October 2014 14	Middlesbrough	1–1	Watford	Middlesbrough
15:00	Ayala (yellow card) 34'; Bamford (yellow card) 46'; Kike 49'; Whitehead (yellow card) 51'; Fredericks (yellow card) 90+2'	Report	Forestieri (yellow card) 39'; Deeney 61'	Stadium: Riverside Stadium; Attendance: 17,491; Referee: James Adcock

1 November 2014 15	Rotherham United	0–3	Middlesbrough	Rotherham
15:00	Bowery (yellow card) 30' (red card); Green (yellow card) 54'; Clarke-Harris (yellow card) 64'	Report	Bamford 8'; Wildschut 19'; Tomlin 87'	Stadium: New York Stadium; Attendance: 11,282; Referee: Mick Russel

4 November 2014 16	Middlesbrough	4–0	Norwich City	Middlesbrough
19:45	Bamford 5'; Leadbitter 33' (pen.), 69'; Wildschut 85'	Report		Stadium: Riverside Stadium; Attendance: 16,468; Referee: Nigel Miller

8 November 2014 17	Middlesbrough	0–0	Bournemouth	Middlesbrough
15:00		Report		Stadium: Riverside Stadium; Attendance: 22,930; Referee: Simon Hooper

22 November 2014 18	Wigan Athletic	1–1	Middlesbrough	Wigan
15:00	Maloney 24'; McCann (yellow card) 49'; Boyce (yellow card) 66'	Report	Bamford 57'; Clayton (yellow card) 23'; Adomah (yellow card) 62'	Stadium: DW Stadium; Attendance: 16,347; Referee: David Webb

29 November 2014 19	Middlesbrough	1–1	Blackburn Rovers	Middlesbrough
15:00	Bamford 83'; Tomlin (yellow card) 55'	Report	Gestede 90+4'; Evans (yellow card) 54'	Stadium: Riverside Stadium; Attendance: 18,152; Referee: Mark Clattenburg

6 December 2014 20	Millwall	1–5	Middlesbrough	South Bermondsey
15:00	McDonald (yellow card) 52' (goal) 78'	Report	Vossen 21', 34', 44'; Bamford 28'; Kike 79'	Stadium: The Den; Attendance: 10,328; Referee: Mick Russell

13 December 2014 21	Middlesbrough	2–0	Derby County	Middlesbrough
12:15	Bamford 6'; Ayala (yellow card) 29'; Leadbitter 63' (pen.) (yellow card) 81'	Report	Hendrick (yellow card) 53'; Shotton (red card) 62'; Bryson (yellow card) 71'; Forsyth (yellow card) 75'	Stadium: Riverside Stadium; Attendance: 17,434; Referee: Roger East

20 December 2014 22	Ipswich Town	2–0	Middlesbrough	Ipswich
15:00	Murphy 24'; McGoldrick (yellow card) 37'; Tabb 45+1'	Report	Vossen (yellow card) 20'; Omeruo (yellow card) 27'; Friend (yellow card) 87'	Stadium: Portman Road; Attendance: 21,187; Referee: James Linington

26 December 2014 23	Middlesbrough	3–0	Nottingham Forest	Middlesbrough
15:00	Friend 52'; Vossen 78'; Leadbitter 87'	Report	Mancienne (yellow card) 38'; Wilson (yellow card) 53' (red card) 66'	Stadium: Riverside Stadium; Attendance: 32,277; Referee: Scott Duncan

28 December 2014 24	Blackburn Rovers	0–0	Middlesbrough	Blackburn
15:00	Gestede (yellow card) 50'; Tunnicliffe (yellow card) 90+3'	Report	Gibson (yellow card) 20'; Whitehead (yellow card) 44'; Ayala (yellow card) 89'	Stadium: Ewood Park; Attendance: 22,304; Referee: Carl Boyeson

10 January 2015 25	Reading	0–0	Middlesbrough	Reading
15:00	Norwood (yellow card) 42'; Obita (yellow card) 54'	Report	Tomlin (yellow card) 68'	Stadium: Madejski Stadium; Attendance: 17,131; Referee: Charles Breakspear

17 January 2015 26	Middlesbrough	2–0	Huddersfield Town	Middlesbrough
	Tomlin 61', 90'	Report		Stadium: Riverside Stadium; Attendance: 18,576; Referee: Peter Bankes

20 January 2015 27	Middlesbrough	2–1	Cardiff City	Middlesbrough
	Bamford 63'; Tomlin 79'	Report	Jones 86'	Stadium: Riverside Stadium; Attendance: 16,035; Referee: Geoff Eltringham

31 January 2015 28	Brentford	0–1	Middlesbrough	Brentford
12:15	Diagouraga (yellow card) 33'; Button (yellow card) 43'; Douglas (yellow card) 62'	Report	Omeruo (yellow card) 16'; Bamford (yellow card) 41'; Leadbitter 44' (pen.); Kike (yellow card) 90'	Stadium: Griffin Park; Attendance: 11,853; Referee: Simon Hooper

7 February 2015 29	Middlesbrough	3–1	Charlton Athletic	Middlesbrough
15:00	Bamford 5'; Vossen 47'; Forshaw (yellow card) 82'; Tomlin 87'	Report	Gudmundsson 37'	Stadium: Riverside Stadium; Attendance: 18,903; Referee: Trevor Kettle

10 February 2015 30	Blackpool	1–2	Middlesbrough	Blackpool
19:45	Clarke (yellow card) 4'; Gibson 85' (o.g.)	Report	Woodgate 82'; Kike 87'	Stadium: Bloomfield Road; Attendance: 10,806; Referee: Chris Kavanagh

18 February 2015 31	Birmingham City	1–1	Middlesbrough	Birmingham
19:45	Cotterill (yellow card) 42'; Caddis 45+1' (pen.)	Report	Konstantopoulos (red card) 43'; Fredericks (yellow card) 56'; Bamford 74'; Adomah (yellow card) 88'; Omeruo (yellow card) 90+6'	Stadium: St Andrew's; Attendance: 15,101; Referee: David Coote

21 February 2015 32	Middlesbrough	0–1	Leeds United	Middlesbrough
12:15	Forshaw (yellow card) 80'	Report	Mowatt 3'; Bellisci (yellow card) 23'; Bamba (yellow card) 57'; Cooper (yellow card) 90+5'	Stadium: Riverside Stadium; Attendance: 25,531; Referee: Andre Marriner

24 February 2015 33	Middlesbrough	1–0	Bolton Wanderers	Middlesbrough
19:45	Adomah 33'; Kike (yellow card) 90+2'	Report	Vela (yellow card) 45+2'; Dervite (yellow card) 67'; Janko (yellow card) 68'; Danns (yellow card) 82'; Heskey (yellow card) 90+4'	Stadium: Riverside Stadium; Attendance: 16,569; Referee: Andy Madley

28 February 2015 34	Sheffield Wednesday	2–0	Middlesbrough	Sheffield
15:00	Nuhiu 52'; Keane 54'	Report		Stadium: Hillsborough; Attendance: 23,774; Referee: Stephen Martin

3 March 2015 35	Middlesbrough	3–0	Millwall	Middlesbrough
15:00	Bamford 26'; Kike 29'; Vossen 78'	Report		Stadium: Riverside Stadium; Attendance: 16,078; Referee: Kevin Wright

7 March 2015 36	Nottingham Forest	2–1	Middlesbrough	Nottingham
15:00	Gardner 33'; Blackstock 65'	Report	Leadbitter 27'	Stadium: City Ground; Attendance: 24,200; Referee: Jon Moss

14 March 2015 37	Middlesbrough	4–1	Ipswich Town	Middlesbrough
12:15	Ayala 4'; Adomah 30'; Gibson (yellow card) 55'; Bamford 64', 79'; Reach (yellow card) 73'	Report	Murphy 11'; Smith (yellow card) 28'; Bishop (yellow card) 45'	Stadium: Riverside Stadium; Attendance: 18,909; Referee: Michael Jones

17 March 2015 38	Derby County	0–1	Middlesbrough	Derby
19:45	Christie (yellow card) 51'; Hughes (yellow card) 57'; Bryson (yellow card) 60'	Report	Vossen (yellow card) 51'; Clayton (yellow card) 63'; Bramford 64'; Reach (yellow card) 90+3'	Stadium: Pride Park; Attendance: 31,939; Referee: Andy D´Urso

21 March 2015 39	Bournemouth	3–0	Middlesbrough	Bournemouth
12:15	Kermorgant 12'; Arter 48'; Pitman 74'	Report		Stadium: Goldsands Stadium; Attendance: 10,998; Referee: Anthony Taylor

3 April 2015 40	Middlesbrough	1–0	Wigan Athletic	Middlesbrough
15:00	Bamford 20'	Report		Stadium: Riverside Stadium; Attendance: 23,082; Referee: Stuart Attwell

6 April 2015 41	Watford	2–0	Middlesbrough	Watford
12:30	Deeney 37'; Ighalo 65'	Report		Stadium: Vicarage Road; Attendance: 19,656; Referee: Mike Jones

11 April 2015 42	Middlesbrough	2–0	Rotherham United	Middlesbrough
15:00	Tomlin 50'; Bamford 66'	Report		Stadium: Riverside Stadium; Attendance: 19,537; Referee: Iain Williamson

14 April 2015 43	Middlesbrough	2–1	Wolverhampton Wanderers	Middlesbrough
19:45	Vossen 3'; Bamford 11'	Report	Sako 53'	Stadium: Riverside Stadium; Attendance: 20,520; Referee: Neil Swarbrick

17 April 2015 44	Norwich	0–1	Middlesbrough	Norwich
19:45	Hoolahan (yellow card) 45+2'; Olsson (yellow card) 73'	Report	Tettey 8' (o.g.)	Stadium: Carrow Road; Attendance: 26,933; Referee: Robert Madley

25 April 2015 45	Fulham	4–3	Middlesbrough	London
15:00	Turner 45'; McCormack 55' (pen.), 67' (pen.), 90'	Report	Reach 63'; Ayala 73'; Kike 88'	Stadium: Craven Cottage; Attendance: 26,993; Referee: Kevin Friend

2 May 2015 46	Middlesbrough	0–0	Brighton	Middlesbrough
12:15		Report		Stadium: Riverside Stadium; Attendance: 33,381; Referee: Andrew Madley

=== FA Cup ===
3 January 2015 Third round	Barnsley	0–2	Middlesbrough	Barnsley
15:00		Report	Vossen 48'; Ayala 84'	Stadium: Oakwell; Attendance: 9,473; Referee: Dean Whitestone

24 January 2015 Fourth round	Manchester City	0–2	Middlesbrough	Manchester
15:00		Report	Bamford 53'; Kike 90'	Stadium: Etihad Stadium; Attendance: 44,836; Referee: Phil Dowd

15 February 2015 Fifth Round	Arsenal	2–0	Middlesbrough	London
16:00	Giroud 27', 29'	Report		Stadium: Emirates Stadium; Attendance: 59, 823; Referee: Mike Dean

=== League Cup ===
The draw for the first round was made on 17 June 2014 at 10am. Middlesbrough were drawn away to Oldham Athletic.

12 August 2014 Round One	Oldham Athletic	0–3	Middlesbrough	Oldham
19:45	Wilson (yellow card) 12'	Report	Williams 30'; Leadbitter 48'; Kike 60'	Stadium: Boundary Park; Attendance: 4,311; Referee: James Adcock

26 August 2014 Round Two	Middlesbrough	3–1	Preston North End	Middlesbrough
19:45	Tomlin 51', 66'; Fewster 57'	Report	Hugill 54'	Stadium: Riverside Stadium; Attendance: 10,727; Referee: Mark Haywood

23 September 2014 Round Three	Liverpool	2–2 (a.e.t.) (14–13 p)	Middlesbrough	Liverpool
19:45	Rossiter 10'; Suso 109'; Sakho (yellow card) 61'	Report	Reach 62' (yellow card) 106'; Bamford 120+3' (pen.); Omeruo (yellow card) 57'	Stadium: Anfield; Referee: Mike Jones
	Penalties
	Balotelli (penalty scored); Lucas (penalty scored); Lallana (penalty scored); Suso (penalty scored); Sterling (penalty missed); Williams (penalty scored); Touré (penalty scored); Sakho (penalty scored); Manquillo (penalty scored); Enrique (penalty scored); Mignolet (penalty scored); Balotelli (penalty scored); Lucas (penalty scored); Lallana (penalty scored); Suso (penalty scored)		Bamford (penalty missed); Clayton (penalty scored); Reach (penalty scored); Adomah (penalty scored); Vossen (penalty scored); Friend (penalty scored); Ayala (penalty scored); Fredericks (penalty scored); Omeruo (penalty scored); Wildschut (penalty scored); Blackman (penalty scored); Bamford (penalty scored); Clayton (penalty scored); Reach (penalty scored); Adomah (penalty missed)

== Transfers ==
=== In ===
Date	Position	Player	Transferred from	Fee	Team	Source
4 July 2014	GK	(Spain) Tomás Mejías	(Spain) Real Madrid	Undisclosed	First Team	
11 July 2014	FW	(Spain) Kike	(Spain) Real Murcia	Undisclosed	First Team	
26 July 2014	DF	(England) James Husband	(England) Doncaster Rovers	£500,000 + Swap	First Team	
31 July 2014	DF	(Equatorial Guinea) Emilio Nsue	(Spain) Real Mallorca	Undisclosed	First Team	
13 August 2014	MF	(England) Adam Clayton	(England) Huddersfield Town	£1,000,000 + Swap	First Team	
16 August 2014	DF	(Spain) Damià Abella	(Spain) Osasuna	Free	First Team	
1 September 2014	MF	(Netherlands) Yanic Wildschut	(Netherlands) Heerenveen	Undisclosed	First Team	
28 January 2015	MF	(England) Adam Forshaw	(England) Wigan Athletic	Undisclosed	First Team	

=== Out ===
Date	Position	Player	Transferred to	Fee	Team	Source
16 May 2014	MF	(England) Matthew Dolan	(England) Bradford City	Free transfer (Released)	First Team	
16 May 2014	DF	(England) Jake Fowler	Free agent	Free transfer (Released)	Reserves	
16 May 2014	DF	(Switzerland) Jayson Leutwiler	(England) Shrewsbury Town	Free transfer (Released)	First Team	
16 May 2014	DF	(Scotland) Cameron Park	(England) Marske United	Free transfer (Released)	First Team	
16 May 2014	DF	(England) Stuart Parnaby	(England) Hartlepool United	Free transfer (Released)	First Team	
16 May 2014	DF	(England) Frazer Richardson	(England) Rotherham United	Free transfer (Released)	First Team	
16 May 2014	DF	(England) Lewis Sirrell	(Sweden) Östersund	Free transfer (Released)	Reserves	
16 May 2014	DF	(England) Matthew Waters	Free agent	Free transfer (Released)	Reserves	
2 July 2014	FW	(Netherlands) Marvin Emnes	(Wales) Swansea City	Undisclosed	First Team	
15 July 2014	FW	(England) Lukas Jutkiewicz	(England) Burnley	Undisclosed	First Team	
30 July 2014	FW	(England) Curtis Main	(England) Doncaster Rovers	Swap	First Team	
13 August 2014	MF	(England) Jacob Butterfield	(England) Huddersfield Town	Swap	First Team	
21 August 2014	DF	(England) Christian Burgess	(England) Peterborough United	Undisclosed	First Team	
22 August 2014	MF	(England) Richard Smallwood	(England) Rotherham United	Undisclosed	First Team	
28 August 2014	FW	(Sierra Leone) Kei Kamara	(United States) Columbus Crew	Free transfer (Released)	First Team	
23 January 2015	FW	(England) Charlie Wyke	(England) Carlisle United	Nominal fee	Reserves	
26 January 2015	MF	(Scotland) Andy Halliday	(England) Bradford City	Undisclosed	First team	

=== Loans in ===
Date from	Position	Player	Loaned from	Date until	Team	Source
6 August 2014	DF	(Nigeria) Kenneth Omeruo	(England) Chelsea	30 June 2015	First team	
28 August 2014	DF	(England) Ryan Fredericks	(England) Tottenham Hotspur	30 June 2015	First team	
29 August 2014	FW	(England) Patrick Bamford	(England) Chelsea	30 June 2015	First team	
1 September 2014	FW	(Belgium) Jelle Vossen	(Belgium) Genk	30 June 2015	First team	
1 September 2014	GK	(England) Jamal Blackman	(England) Chelsea	17 January 2015	First team	
16 October 2014	DF	(Serbia) Miloš Veljković	(England) Tottenham Hotspur	17 January 2015	First team	
9 January 2015	DF	(Czech Republic) Tomáš Kalas	(England) Chelsea	30 June 2015	First team	
25 March 2015	DF	(Venezuela) Fernando Amorebieta	(England) Fulham	30 June 2015	First team	
26 March 2015	DF	(Netherlands) Dwight Tiendalli	(Wales) Swansea City	30 June 2015	First team	

=== Loans out ===
Date from	Position	Player	Loaned to	Date until	Team	Source
8 August 2014	MF	(Northern Ireland) Ryan Brobbel	(England) Hartlepool United	8 November 2014	Reserves	
19 August 2014	MF	(England) Richard Smallwood	(England) Rotherham United	22 August 2014	First team	
19 August 2014	DF	(England) Christian Burgess	(England) Peterborough United	21 August 2014	Reserves	
21 August 2014	FW	(England) Charlie Wyke	(England) Hartlepool United	24 November 2014	Reserves	
1 September 2014	GK	(England) Jason Steele	(England) Blackburn Rovers	30 June 2015	First team	
1 September 2014	DF	(England) Seb Hines	(England) Coventry City	4 January 2015	First team	
26 September 2014	DF	(England) David Atkinson	(England) Hartlepool United	26 October 2014	Reserves	
17 October 2014	MF	(Scotland) Andy Halliday	(England) Bradford City	26 January 2015	First team	
23 October 2014	FW	(England) Luke Williams	(England) Scunthorpe United	3 January 2015	First team	
14 November 2014	DF	(England) Brad Halliday	(England) York City	13 December 2014	Reserves	
20 November 2014	MF	(England) Bryn Morris	(England) Burton Albion	19 December 2014	Reserves	
24 November 2014	MF	(Argentina) Emmanuel Ledesma	(England) Rotherham United	20 December 2014	First team	
27 November 2014	FW	(England) Bradley Fewster	(England) Preston North End	30 June 2015	Reserves	
2 February 2015	FW	(England) Luke Williams	(England) Coventry City	12 March 2015	First team	
13 February 2015	MF	(England) Jordan Jones	(England) Hartlepool United	30 June 2015	Reserves	
19 February 2015	MF	(Argentina) Emmanuel Ledesma	(England) Brighton & Hove Albion	21 March 2015	First team	
25 March 2015	DF	(England) James Husband	(England) Fulham	30 June 2015	First team	
26 March 2015	FW	(England) Luke Williams	(England) Peterborough United	30 June 2015	First team	
26 March 2015	DF	(England) David Atkinson	(England) Carlisle United	30 June 2015	Reserves	
26 March 2015	MF	(The Gambia) Mustapha Carayol	(England) Brighton & Hove Albion	30 June 2015	First team	
