= Bradley Fewster =

English footballer (born 1996)

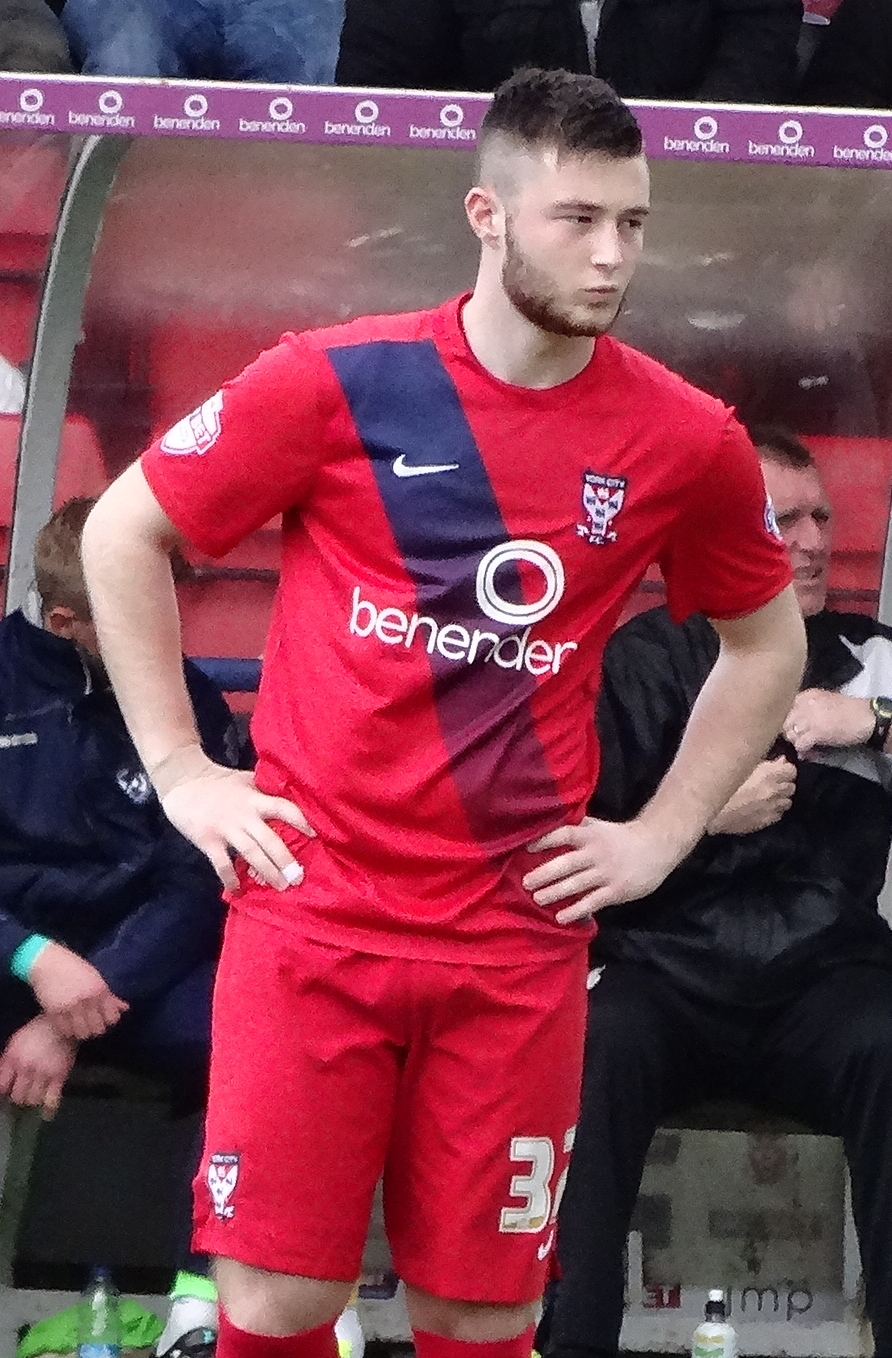
- Fewster playing for York City in 2016

Personal information
- Full name: Bradley William Fewster
- Date of birth: 27 January 1996 (age 30)
- Place of birth: Middlesbrough, England
- Height: 5 ft 10 in (1.78 m)
- Position: Striker

Team information
- Current team: Redcar Athletic

Youth career
- –2014: Middlesbrough

Senior career*
Years	Team	Apps	(Gls)
2014–2017	Middlesbrough	0	(0)
2014	→ Preston North End (loan)	0	(0)
2015–2016	→ York City (loan)	24	(8)
2016	→ Hartlepool United (loan)	4	(0)
2017–2018	Spennymoor Town	20	(0)
2018–2019	Blyth Spartans	19	(3)
2019–2024	Whitby Town	107	(36)
2024–	Redcar Athletic	87	(50)

International career
- England U16
- England U17
- England U18
2014–2015	England U19	7	(5)
- * Club domestic league appearances and goals as of 17:30, 18 October 2026 (UTC)

Bradley William Fewster (born 27 January 1996) is an English semi-professional footballer who plays as a striker for Redcar Athletic.

Fewster started his career with Middlesbrough, and had loan spells with Preston North End, York City and Hartlepool United. He was released by Middlesbrough in 2017 and spent a season with Spennymoor Town before joining Blyth Spartans. He has represented England from under-16 through to under-19 level.

== Club career ==
=== Middlesbrough ===
Born in Middlesbrough, North Yorkshire, Fewster joined the Middlesbrough academy before signing a three-year professional contract in July 2013. Fewster made his first-team debut on 12 August 2014 in a League Cup win over Oldham Athletic, starting the game. Fewster scored his first goal against Preston North End on 27 August 2014 on his second senior outing for the club.

Fewster joined League One club Preston North End on 27 November 2014 on a season-long youth loan. However, the loan was cut short for "personal reasons" after only two weeks. Fewster signed for League Two club York City on 26 November 2015 on a one-month youth loan and scored on his debut against Accrington Stanley.

On 30 August 2016, Fewster joined League Two club Hartlepool United on loan until 31 December. He was released by Middlesbrough at the end of the 2016–17 season.

=== Spennymoor Town and Blyth Spartans ===
Fewster signed for National League North club Spennymoor Town on 31 August 2017. He signed for another National League North club, Blyth Spartans, on 11 July 2018.

=== Whitby Town ===
On 28 February 2019, Fewster joined Whitby Town on a contract until the end of next season. Fewster's first season with Whitby was ended prematurely due to the COVID-19 outbreak, he scored nine times in 10 league appearances in his debut season with the club.

== International career ==
Fewster has represented England at under-16, under-17, under-18 and under-19 levels.

On 18 February 2014, Fewster scored a hat-trick for England under-18s against Belgium U18. He scored on his under-19 debut against Germany in a 1–1 draw, before scoring four goals in three matches in the first round of 2015 UEFA European Under-19 Championship qualification.

== Career statistics ==
As of 17 October 2026

Appearances and goals by club, season and competition
Club	Season	League			National Cup		League Cup		Other		Total	
Club	Season	Division	Apps	Goals	Apps	Goals	Apps	Goals	Apps	Goals	Apps	Goals
Middlesbrough	2014–15	Championship	0	0	0	0	2	1	0	0	2	1
Middlesbrough	2015–16	Championship	0	0	0	0	0	0	—		0	0
Middlesbrough	2016–17	Premier League	0	0	0	0	—		—		0	0
Middlesbrough	Total		0	0	0	0	2	1	0	0	2	1
Preston North End (loan)	2014–15	League One	0	0	0	0	—		—		0	0
York City (loan)	2015–16	League Two	24	8	—		—		—		24	8
Hartlepool United (loan)	2016–17	League Two	4	0	0	0	—		1 (Note: Appearance in EFL Trophy)	0	5	0
Spennymoor Town	2017–18	National League North	20	0	0	0	—		4 (Note: Appearances in FA Trophy)	0	24	0
Blyth Spartans	2018–19	National League North	19	3	4	1	—		2	0	25	4
Whitby Town	2019–20	NPL Premier Division	10	9	2	2	0	0	0	0	12	11
Whitby Town	2020–21	NPL Premier Division	7	3	1	0	0	0	0	0	8	3
Whitby Town	2021–22	NPL Premier Division	34	8	2	2	0	0	5	1	41	11
Whitby Town	2022–23	NPL Premier Division	31	10	1	0	0	0	3	2	35	12
Whitby Town	2023–24	NPL Premier Division	25	6	3	0	0	0	1	0	29	6
Whitby Town	Total		107	36	9	4	0	0	9	3	125	43
Redcar Athletic	2024–25	Northern League Division One	36	20	1	0	0	0	4	1	41	21
Redcar Athletic	2025–26	NPL Division One East	40	24	4	2	0	0	3	1	47	27
Redcar Athletic	2026–27	NPL Premier Division	11	6	1	0	0	0	0	0	12	6
Redcar Athletic	Total		87	50	6	2	0	0	7	2	100	54
Career total			261	97	19	7	2	1	23	5	305	110

== Honours ==
Individual

- Football League Two Player of the Month: February 2016
