= Ben Gibson =

English footballer (born 1993)

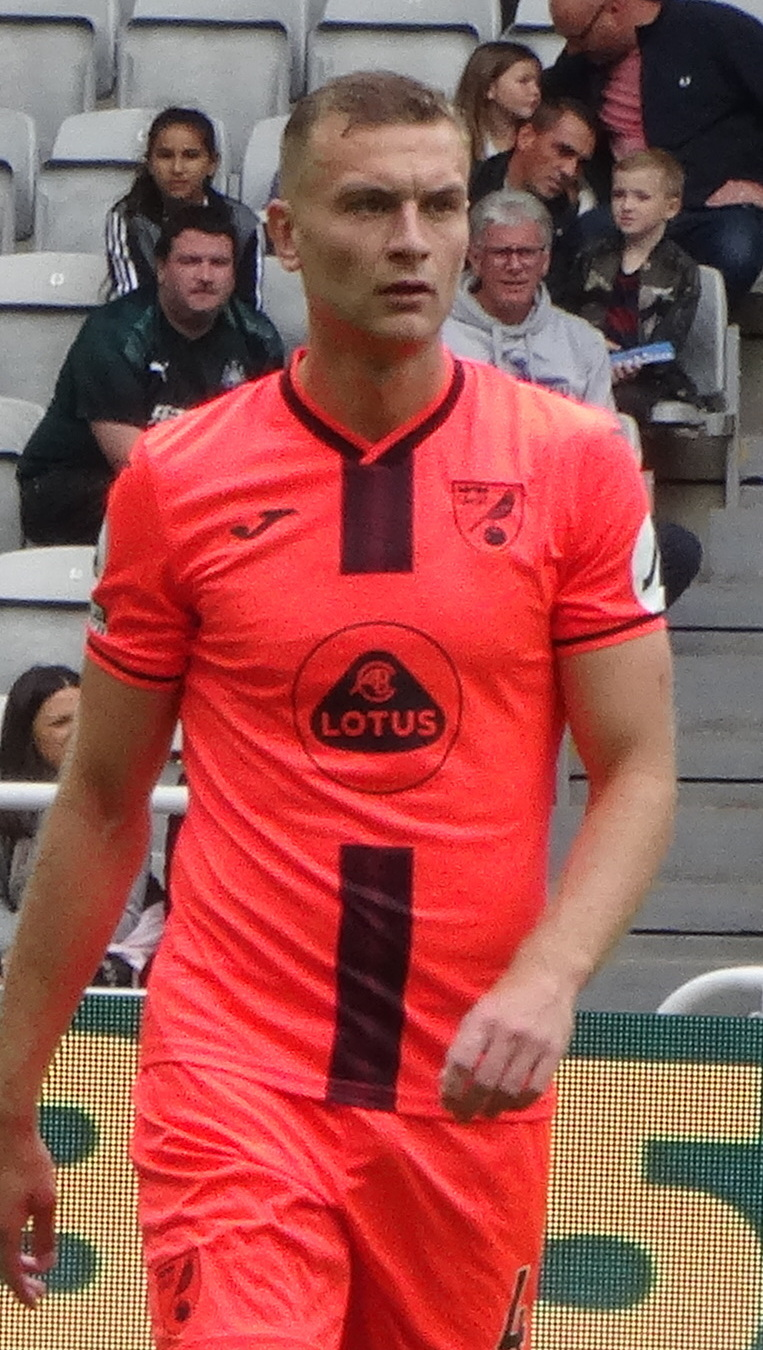
- Gibson playing for Norwich City in 2021

Personal information
- Full name: Benjamin James Gibson
- Date of birth: 15 January 1993 (age 33)
- Place of birth: Nunthorpe, Middlesbrough, England
- Height: 6 ft 1 in (1.85 m)
- Position: Centre-back

Team information
- Current team: Stoke City
- Number: 23

Youth career
- 2005–2010: Middlesbrough

Senior career*
Years	Team	Apps	(Gls)
2010–2018	Middlesbrough	185	(4)
2011	→ Plymouth Argyle (loan)	13	(0)
2012	→ York City (loan)	8	(0)
2012–2013	→ Tranmere Rovers (loan)	20	(0)
2013	→ Tranmere Rovers (loan)	8	(1)
2018–2021	Burnley	1	(1)
2020–2021	→ Norwich City (loan)	27	(0)
2021–2024	Norwich City	86	(0)
2024–	Stoke City	38	(4)

International career
2009–2010	England U17	5	(1)
2011	England U18	1	(0)
2014	England U20	4	(0)
2014–2015	England U21	10	(1)
Medal record
Men's football
Representing England
UEFA European Under-17 Championship
Winner	2010 Liechtenstein
- * Club domestic league appearances and goals as of 15:52, 22 August 2026 (UTC)

Benjamin James Gibson (born 15 January 1993) is an English professional footballer who plays as a centre-back for EFL Championship club Stoke City.

Having graduated from Middlesbrough's Academy, Gibson had loan spells with Plymouth Argyle, York City and Tranmere Rovers before breaking into the club's first team in 2013. he was part of the Middlesbrough team that secured promotion to the Premier League in 2015–16 and the following year earned his first call-up to the England national team. He moved to Burnley in August 2018 for a fee of £15 million. His time at Turf Moor was unsuccessful and after making a handful of appearances he left for Norwich City in September 2020. Gibson spent four seasons with the Canaries and joined Stoke City in June 2024.

== Early and personal life ==
Gibson was born in Nunthorpe, Middlesbrough, and attended Nunthorpe School and Yarm School. He is a nephew of Middlesbrough Football Club chairman Steve Gibson.

== Club career ==
=== Middlesbrough ===
Gibson joined Middlesbrough's Academy from Marton at the age of 12. He was a member of the Middlesbrough team that won the Nike Cup in 2008 and signed his first professional contract with the club on 1 July 2010. He made his first-team debut as a substitute on 25 April 2011 against Coventry City, coming on in the 41st minute for the injured Andrew Davies, with Middlesbrough going on to win the game 2–1. He finished the 2010–11 season with one appearance for Middlesbrough, and having captained the reserve team to The Football Combination East Division title.

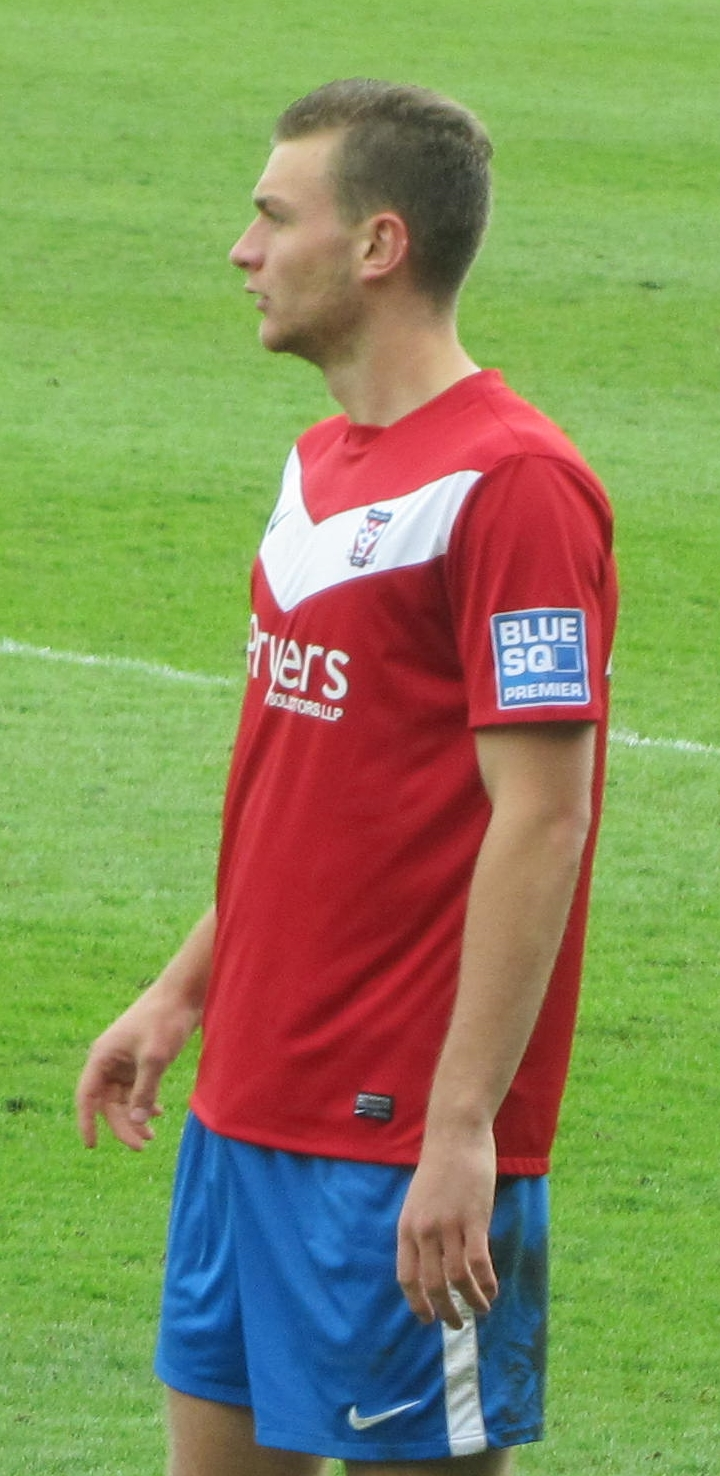
Gibson playing for York City in 2012

Gibson signed a three-month loan deal with League Two club Plymouth Argyle on 2 August 2011. After making 13 appearances in this time, Gibson and both clubs involved agreed on 1 November 2011 to extend the loan deal until 29 January 2012. However, the loan was cut short after Middlesbrough recalled him on 30 November 2011. He signed for Conference Premier club York City on loan until the end of 2011–12 on 9 February 2012. After a promising start Gibson was sent off in the 1–0 away victory to Cambridge United. However, after missing the next four games through suspension he won the 2012 FA Trophy Final with York at Wembley Stadium on 12 May, in which the team beat Newport County 2–0. Eight days later he played in the 2–1 victory over Luton Town in the 2012 Conference Premier play-off final at Wembley on 20 May 2012, seeing the club return to the Football League after an eight-year absence with promotion to League Two. Gibson completed his loan at York with 11 appearances.

On 14 August 2012, Gibson joined League One club Tranmere Rovers on a one-month loan. The month was extended until January 2013 the following month, but in December 2012 was ruled out of action with an abductor problem, thus ending the duration of his first loan spell at Rovers. He signed a new four-year contract with Middlesbrough on 18 December 2012. On 13 March 2013, Gibson returned on loan to Rovers, until the end of the season.

The 2013–14 season saw Gibson become more involved in the first team squad for Middlesbrough; the team did not perform well, and manager Tony Mowbray was sacked in October 2013. Aitor Karanka replaced him, and they finished twelfth. The 2014–15 season saw the club finish fourth, qualifying for the play-offs. They reached the final at Wembley Stadium, having won 5–1 on aggregate against Brentford, but were defeated 2–0 by Norwich City. In the 2015–16 season, Gibson helped Middlesbrough secure promotion to the Premier League, having finished as runners-up in the Championship.

Gibson still remained as a crucial part of Middlesbrough's squad in their 2016–17 Premier League campaign, though they did not record positive results; they dropped into relegation zone in March 2017, with Karanka being sacked later that month. Their relegation back to the Championship was confirmed in May 2017, after a 3–0 defeat to champions Chelsea, with the club having only been in the English top flight for one season.

=== Burnley ===
Gibson signed for Premier League club Burnley on 5 August 2018 on a four-year contract for a joint club-record fee of £15 million. He made his debut on 16 August in a 1–0 win over İstanbul Başakşehir in a UEFA Europa League third qualifying round second leg match. Gibson then appeared in their next Europa League fixture the following week, a 3–1 defeat to Olympiacos, in which he was sent off for a second bookable offence. Gibson underwent surgery on a hernia in September 2018. He made his Premier League debut for the club on 26 December 2018, in which he scored Burnley's only goal of the match, which was a 5–1 defeat to Everton.

Gibson made just one appearance during the 2019–20 season, starting in a 3–1 loss to Sunderland in the third round of the EFL Cup. In February 2020, Gibson was permitted by the club to train with former club Middlesbrough after informing the club his desire to leave in January. Speaking in November 2020, Gibson described his time at Turf Moor as a "disaster".

=== Norwich City ===
Gibson returned to the Championship on 4 September 2020, signing for newly relegated team Norwich City on a season-long loan, with the transfer becoming permanent if Norwich were to achieve promotion back to the Premier League that season. He made his debut on 3 October in a 1–0 defeat to Derby County. Gibson was a member of the Norwich team that won the Championship title, achieving promotion back up to the Premier League at the first time of asking. He missed the end of the season after suffering an ankle ligament injury. Gibson signed for Norwich permanently on 1 July 2021 on a three-year contract for an undisclosed fee, reported by the Lancashire Telegraph to be £8 million. Gibson made 24 appearances in 2021–22 as Norwich finished bottom and were relegated back to the Championship.

Gibson played 24 times in 2022–23 as they failed to make the play-offs, finishing in 13th. He scored his only goal for Norwich in a 5–2 FA Cup defeat at Liverpool on 29 January 2024. He made 40 appearances in 2023–24, helping Norwich make the play-offs where they lost 4–0 to Leeds United. He was released by Norwich at the end of the season.

=== Stoke City ===
Gibson joined Stoke City on 7 June 2024 signing a three-year contract. Upon his arrival, he was named club captain. In the first half of the 2024–25 season Gibson was a regular starter under Narcís Pèlach with whom he had worked with at Norwich as the team struggled at the foot of the Championship. Pèlach was replaced by Mark Robins in January 2025 and Gibson was left out of the side until the final few games of the season where Stoke avoided relegation on the final day. Injuries restricted Gibson to a bit-part role in 2025–26, making 15 appearances.

== International career ==
Gibson has competed for the England under-17s, the under-18s, the under-20s and the under-21s. He was part of the under-17 teams that won the 2009 Nordic Cup, where he scored in the final against Scotland, and the 2010 UEFA European Under-17 Championship.

Gibson made his debut for England under-21s in the first leg of the 2015 UEFA European Under-21 Championship qualification play-offs against Croatia on the back of an impressive campaign for Middlesbrough. His performances made him a key member of the under-21 set up and he formed an effective partnership with John Stones. Gibson scored his first goal for the under-21s in England's final friendly before the European Championships against Belarus. He went on to play 90 minutes in all of England's three group stage matches in the tournament although could not stop their disappointing early departure.

Gibson received his first call-up to the England national team on 24 March 2017, replacing the injured Chris Smalling for the 2018 FIFA World Cup qualifier against Lithuania.

== Career statistics ==
As of match played 22 August 2026

Appearances and goals by club, season and competition
Club	Season	League			FA Cup		League Cup		Other		Total	
Club	Season	Division	Apps	Goals	Apps	Goals	Apps	Goals	Apps	Goals	Apps	Goals
Middlesbrough	2010–11	Championship	1	0	0	0	0	0	—		1	0
Middlesbrough	2011–12	Championship	0	0	0	0	0	0	—		0	0
Middlesbrough	2012–13	Championship	1	0	0	0	0	0	—		1	0
Middlesbrough	2013–14	Championship	31	1	1	0	1	0	—		33	1
Middlesbrough	2014–15	Championship	36	0	2	0	0	0	3 (Note: Appearances in Championship play-offs)	0	41	0
Middlesbrough	2015–16	Championship	33	1	0	0	3	0	—		36	1
Middlesbrough	2016–17	Premier League	38	1	2	0	1	0	—		41	1
Middlesbrough	2017–18	Championship	45	1	2	0	1	0	2	0	50	1
Middlesbrough	Total		185	4	7	0	6	0	5	0	203	4
Plymouth Argyle (loan)	2011–12	League Two	13	0	1	0	1	0	1 (Note: Appearance in Football League Trophy)	0	16	0
York City (loan)	2011–12	Conference Premier	8	0	0	0	—		3 (Note: Two appearances in FA Trophy, one in Conference Premier play-offs)	0	11	0
Tranmere Rovers (loan)	2012–13	League One	28	1	2	0	2	0	1	0	33	1
Burnley	2018–19	Premier League	1	1	2	0	0	0	2 (Note: Appearances in UEFA Europa League)	0	5	1
Burnley	2019–20	Premier League	0	0	0	0	1	0	—		1	0
Burnley	Total		1	1	2	0	1	0	2	0	6	1
Norwich City (loan)	2020–21	Championship	27	0	2	0	0	0	—		29	0
Norwich City	2021–22	Premier League	28	0	2	0	1	0	—		31	0
Norwich City	2022–23	Championship	23	0	0	0	1	0	—		24	0
Norwich City	2023–24	Championship	35	0	2	1	1	0	2	0	40	1
Norwich City	Total		85	0	4	1	3	0	2	0	94	1
Stoke City	2024–25	Championship	24	3	1	0	0	0	—		25	3
Stoke City	2025–26	Championship	13	1	0	0	2	0	—		15	1
Stoke City	2026–27	Championship	1	0	0	0	0	0	—		1	0
Stoke City	Total		38	4	1	0	2	0	0	0	41	4
Career total			386	10	19	1	15	0	14	0	434	11

== Honours ==
York City

- FA Trophy: 2011–12
- Conference Premier play-offs: 2012

Norwich City

- EFL Championship: 2020–21

England U17

- UEFA European Under-17 Championship: 2010
