= Lee Tomlin =

English association football player

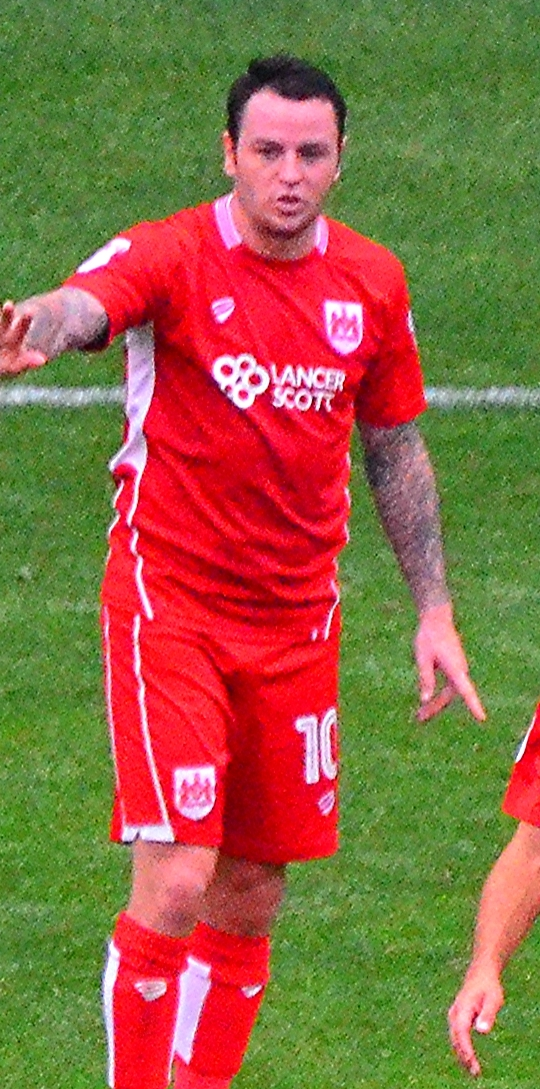
- Tomlin playing for Bristol City in 2016

Personal information
- Full name: Lee Marc Tomlin
- Date of birth: 12 January 1989 (age 37)
- Place of birth: Leicester, England
- Height: 5 ft 11 in (1.80 m)
- Position: Attacking midfielder

Team information
- Current team: Bristol Rovers (first-team coach)

Youth career
- 1996–2005: Leicester City
- 2005: Rushden & Diamonds

Senior career*
Years	Team	Apps	(Gls)
2005–2010	Rushden & Diamonds	156	(27)
2007	→ Brackley Town (loan)	2	(0)
2010–2014	Peterborough United	135	(32)
2014–2015	Middlesbrough	56	(11)
2015–2016	AFC Bournemouth	6	(0)
2016	→ Bristol City (loan)	18	(6)
2016–2017	Bristol City	38	(6)
2017–2021	Cardiff City	51	(10)
2018	→ Nottingham Forest (loan)	15	(4)
2019	→ Peterborough United (loan)	19	(2)
2022	Walsall	5	(0)
2022	Doncaster Rovers	9	(1)
2022–2023	Ilkeston Town	10	(3)
2023	Harborough Town	4	(0)
Total		524	(102)

International career
2009	England C	2	(0)

Managerial career
- 2026: Morecambe (joint-caretaker)
- * Club domestic league appearances and goals as of 31 December 2023

Lee Marc Tomlin (born 12 January 1989) is an English professional football coach and former player who played as a midfielder. He is currently first-team coach at Bristol Rovers.

== Early life ==
Tomlin was born in Leicester, Leicestershire. He started his career with the youth system of Leicester City in 1996 before joining Rushden & Diamonds's youth system in 2005. In October 2005, he became Rushden's youngest ever first-team player when he came on as a substitute for Drewe Broughton in the 74th minute. Throughout the rest of the season he made several more substitute appearances, but his first start came in November 2005, in an FA Cup first round replay against Halifax Town. He made 21 appearances in League Two in the 2005–06 season.

== Club career ==
=== Early career ===
Before the 2006–07 season, Tomlin attracted the attention of several big clubs and he earned a trial with Liverpool. Throughout the season, he made more starts and became more of a regular in the Rushden starting eleven. On 21 October 2006, he scored his first goal for the club against Weymouth, the match after Paul Hart was sacked, in the 21st minute. He immediately followed this with another goal, this time against Altrincham in the FA Cup fourth qualifying round. He scored four goals during the season, playing as a forward and on both wings.

Tomlin joined Southern League Premier Division club Brackley Town in October 2007 on a one-month loan, making two appearances.

Tomlin switched to left midfield for the 2009–10 season, under his influential manager Justin Edinburgh whom he credited for his development and achieving his move to the Football League. Following the end of the season a six-figure bid for Tomlin was rejected from another Blue Square Bet Premier club believed to be Crawley Town and Rushden confirmed he would be offered a new contract.

=== Peterborough United ===
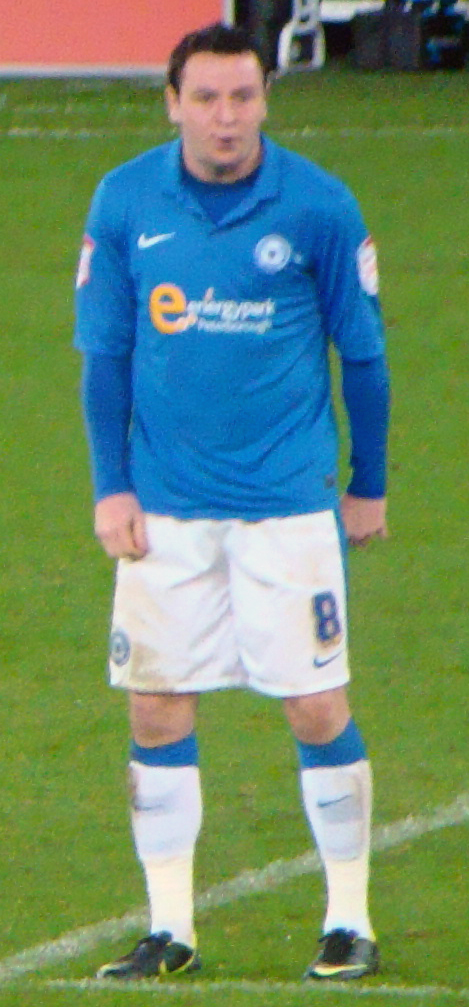
Tomlin playing for Peterborough United in 2012

Tomlin signed for League One club Peterborough United for an undisclosed fee on 6 August 2010. He went on to assist the team gain promotion with a hard working display against Huddersfield Town at Old Trafford, which The Posh won 3–0.

He continued to develop his reputation at Championship level and on 20 August 2011, he scored his first professional hat-trick in a game against Ipswich Town, helping Peterborough to a 7–1 win.

Tomlin beat five defenders to score in Peterborough's last game of the 2012–13 season, away to Crystal Palace, but a 3–2 defeat confirmed their relegation back to League One.

=== Middlesbrough ===
On 31 January 2014, Tomlin signed for Middlesbrough on loan for the remainder of the 2013–14 season with a view to a permanent move. On 18 February, it was announced that he had signed permanently on a three-and-a-half-year contract. Tomlin made his debut on 22 February in a 0–0 draw against Leeds United, coming on as a substitute for Kei Kamara.

In the 2014-15 season, Tomlin made 29 starts and a further 10 substitute appearances in the league as Middlesbrough competed at the top of the table.

After a run of fine performances, most notably in Middlesbrough's 2–0 victory over Manchester City in the FA Cup, Tomlin was named Championship Player of the Month for January 2015.

The club finished 4th in the league to qualify for the Championship play-offs. Tomlin started in both legs of the semi-final against Brentford, and scored the first of three goals in a 3–0 second leg home win which took the aggregate score to 5–1, and saw Middlesbrough progress to the final. Ultimately Middlesbrough lost the final 2–0 to Norwich City at Wembley. Across the season Tomlin made a total of 48 appearances in league and cup competitions, scoring 9 goals.

=== Bournemouth ===
On 4 August 2015, Tomlin signed for Premier League newcomers AFC Bournemouth on a three-year deal for a fee of around £3.5 million. He made his debut against Liverpool, coming on for Yann Kermorgant. He scored his only goal for Bournemouth in the 2015–16 season, a penalty against Birmingham City in the FA Cup.

=== Bristol City ===
Tomlin signed for Championship club, Bristol City on a season-long loan, on 27 January 2016. He later made his debut in a goalless draw against Birmingham City on 30 January. Tomlin went onto score 6 goals in 18 appearances, including goals in a 6–0 win over Bolton Wanderers and a 4–0 win over Huddersfield Town.

During the summer, Tomlin opened talks with Bristol City and took part in a medical on 4 July.

=== Cardiff City ===
On 13 July 2017, Tomlin joined Championship rivals Cardiff City on a three-year contract for an undisclosed fee, making his debut for the club on the opening day of the 2017–18 season during a 1–0 victory over Burton Albion.

On 31 January 2018, Tomlin joined Nottingham Forest on loan in a swap deal with Jamie Ward moving to Cardiff on loan in return. He scored his first goal for Forest in a 1–1 draw with Reading on 20 February 2018.

On 18 December 2018, it was announced that Tomlin was training with Peterborough United and would return to the club on loan from 1 January 2019 until the end of the season. However, the move was delayed due to paperwork issues. The transfer was eventually completed on 8 January.

Tomlin signed a new two-and-a-half-year contract with Cardiff on 10 January 2020.

Tomlin left the club by mutual consent on 4 October 2021.

=== Walsall ===
On 25 February 2022, Tomlin signed for EFL League Two club Walsall on a short-term deal until the end of the 2021–22 season. Tomlin made five appearances with the club, four of which off the bench, before being released at the end of the season.

=== Doncaster Rovers and retirement ===
After playing for Doncaster Rovers in summer 2022, Tomlin retired due to injury in October 2022.

=== Ilkeston Town ===
On 1 December 2022, Tomlin came out of his retirement to join Ilkeston Town as player-coach.

== Coaching career ==
On 20 August 2025, Tomlin was appointed as assistant manager of National League club Morecambe. In January 2026, he was appointed joint-caretaker manager following the sacking of Ashvir Singh Johal.

On 30 October 2026, Tomlin joined League Two club Bristol Rovers as first-team coach, covering in the absence of assistant manager Paul Raynor who was undergoing bowel cancer treatment.

== International career ==
Tomlin was capped twice by the England national C team in 2009.

== Career statistics ==
Appearances and goals by club, season and competition
Club	Season	League			FA Cup		League Cup		Other		Total	
Club	Season	Division	Apps	Goals	Apps	Goals	Apps	Goals	Apps	Goals	Apps	Goals
Rushden & Diamonds	2005–06	League Two	21	0	3	0	0	0	2 (Note: Appearance(s) in Football League Trophy)	0	26	0
Rushden & Diamonds	2006–07	Conference National	25	4	3	1	—		2 (Note: Appearances in FA Trophy)	1	30	6
Rushden & Diamonds	2007–08	Conference Premier	34	1	1	0	—		7 (Note: Three appearances and three goals in FA Trophy, four appearances in Conference League Cup)	3	42	4
Rushden & Diamonds	2008–09	Conference Premier	41	8	1	0	—		3	0	45	8
Rushden & Diamonds	2009–10	Conference Premier	35	14	3	1	—		4 (Note: Two appearances in FA Trophy, two in Conference Premier play-offs)	0	42	15
Rushden & Diamonds	Total		156	27	11	2	0	0	18	4	185	33
Brackley Town (loan)	2007–08	SL Premier Division	2	0	—		—		—		2	0
Peterborough United	2010–11	League One	37	8	4	3	2	0	4 (Note: One appearance in Football League Trophy, three in League One play-offs)	0	47	11
Peterborough United	2011–12	Championship	37	8	1	0	2	1	—		40	9
Peterborough United	2012–13	Championship	42	11	0	0	2	2	—		44	13
Peterborough United	2013–14	League One	19	5	2	0	3	5	1	0	25	10
Peterborough United	Total		135	32	7	3	9	8	5	0	156	43
Middlesbrough	2013–14	Championship	14	4	—		—		—		14	4
Middlesbrough	2014–15	Championship	42	7	3	0	2	2	3 (Note: Appearances in Championship play-offs)	1	50	10
Middlesbrough	Total		56	11	3	0	2	2	3	1	64	14
AFC Bournemouth	2015–16	Premier League	6	0	1	1	3	0	—		10	1
Bristol City (loan)	2015–16	Championship	18	6	—		—		—		18	6
Bristol City	2016–17	Championship	38	6	1	0	3	1	—		42	7
Bristol City	Total		56	12	1	0	3	1	—		60	13
Cardiff City	2017–18	Championship	13	1	1	0	2	0	—		16	1
Cardiff City	2018–19	Premier League	0	0	0	0	0	0	—		0	0
Cardiff City	2019–20	Championship	33	8	1	0	0	0	2 (Note: Appearances in Championship play-offs)	1	36	9
Cardiff City	2020–21	Championship	5	1	0	0	0	0	0	0	5	1
Cardiff City	2021–22	Championship	0	0	0	0	0	0	0	0	0	0
Cardiff City	Total		51	10	2	0	2	0	1	0	56	10
Nottingham Forest (loan)	2017–18	Championship	15	4	—		—		—		15	4
Peterborough United (loan)	2018–19	League One	19	2	—		—		2 (Note: Appearances in EFL Trophy)	0	21	2
Walsall	2021–22	League Two	5	0	0	0	0	0	0	0	5	0
Doncaster Rovers	2022–23	League Two	9	1	0	0	1	0	0	0	10	1
Career total			510	99	25	6	20	11	30	6	585	122

== Honours ==
Peterborough United

- Football League One play-offs: 2011

Cardiff City

- EFL Championship runner-up: 2017–18

Individual

- Football League Championship Player of the Month: January 2015
