= Grant Leadbitter =

English footballer (born 1986)

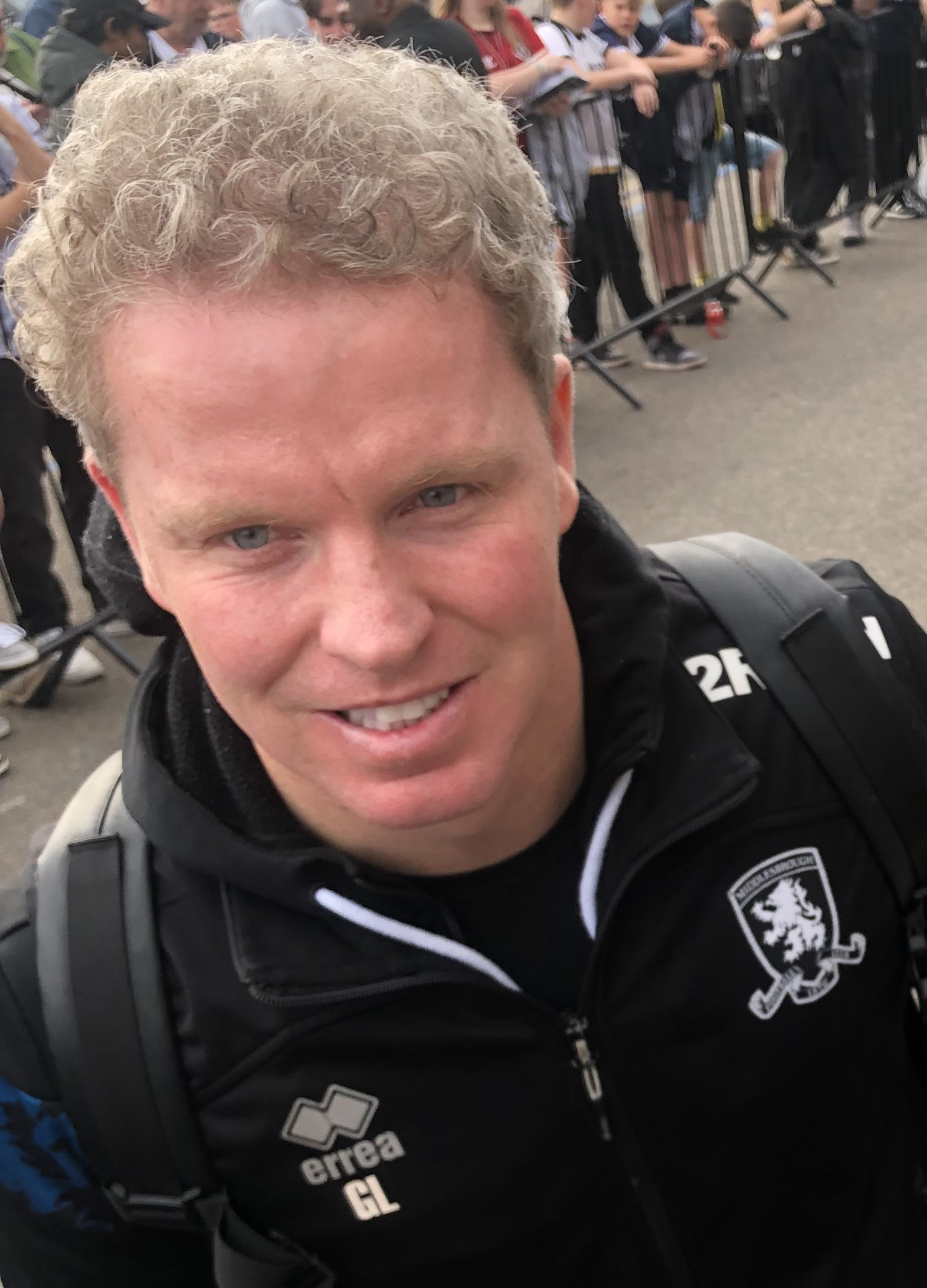
- Leadbitter in 2025

Personal information
- Full name: Grant Leadbitter
- Date of birth: 7 January 1986 (age 40)
- Place of birth: Chester-le-Street, England
- Height: 5 ft 9 in (1.75 m)
- Position: Midfielder

Youth career
- 2002–2003: Sunderland

Senior career*
Years	Team	Apps	(Gls)
2003–2009	Sunderland	111	(11)
2005	→ Rotherham United (loan)	5	(1)
2009–2012	Ipswich Town	116	(13)
2012–2019	Middlesbrough	212	(28)
2019–2021	Sunderland	69	(7)
Total		513	(60)

International career
2001–2002	England U16	10	(0)
2002–2003	England U17	9	(0)
2004–2005	England U19	11	(0)
2005	England U20	1	(0)
2007–2008	England U21	3	(0)
- * Club domestic league appearances and goals as of 9 May 2021

Grant Leadbitter (born 7 January 1986) is an English former professional footballer who played as a midfielder. He made more than 500 appearances in the Premier League and Football League, which included 212 for Middlesbrough, 180 for Sunderland and 116 for Ipswich Town. Leadbitter retired at the end of the 2021 season, having won the EFL Trophy in his final season with Sunderland.

Leadbitter played for Sunderland from 2003 until 2009 after rising as a product from the team's Youth Academy before signing for Ipswich Town. He spent seven seasons with Middlesbrough before finishing his career with Sunderland. In 2007 Leadbitter received a call-up for England U21, and featured for them three times.

Leadbitter spent the 2021/2022 season gaining his UEFA A License. Since October 2022, he has been part of the first-team coaching staff at Middlesbrough.

== Early life ==
Leadbitter was born in Chester-le-Street, County Durham. He grew up in Fence Houses as a Sunderland fan, and joined the Sunderland youth academy at the age of 16. He progressed through the ranks and represented England at the U19 level in 2002, scoring against Brazil to help England finish in the top four in the league tournament.

== Club career ==
=== Sunderland ===
Leadbitter's first professional appearance for Sunderland came as a substitute in a League Cup defeat against Huddersfield Town in September 2003. Before obtaining a regular first-team place at the club, he was loaned to Rotherham United in September 2005, where he scored once against Swansea in five league games. After his loan stay in Hibernian, he began to be selected regularly by then manager Mick McCarthy, and played in 11 of Sunderland's final 14 matches of the season.

After Sunderland's relegation in 2006, Leadbitter stalled on contract talks, with many predicting he was aiming to attract the attention of a Premier League club after his impressive displays during the previous season. However, a contract was subsequently agreed with the player claiming he only ever wanted to stay with Sunderland and, henceforth, Leadbitter played an important role in the Black Cats' revival under the management of Roy Keane. Leadbitter took part in every one of Sunderland's games in the 2006–07 season and contributed seven goals, ranking as the club's third top scorer of that season. On Sunderland's return to the Premier League, Leadbitter continued to feature regularly with Keane, even making comparisons with Paul Scholes (he allegedly wears the number 18 shirt in honour of his hero Scholes). In June 2008 Leadbitter signed a new contract with Sunderland, keeping him at the club until 2011.

On 4 October 2008, Leadbitter scored a memorable goal against Arsenal after just coming off the bench. The 25-yard goal was celebrated in emotional style, as he ran over to his manager and had his head on the floor, nearly in tears. This emotional celebration was because his father, Brian Leadbitter, had died just weeks beforehand and his ashes had been buried right on that spot under the grass on the Stadium of Light. "People close to me know why I went down on the floor like I did, I just want to leave it at that. The people who know me know why I kissed that area of the ground. My dad's ashes were buried there. I don't want to go on about it. It just means a lot to me and my family. It's exactly that spot and it was always my intention to do something like that when I scored my first goal here." Leadbitter said to the press after the match.

=== Ipswich Town ===
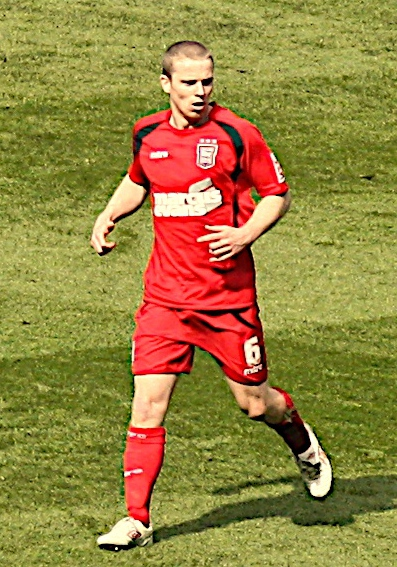
Leadbitter playing for Ipswich Town in 2010.

On 1 September 2009, Leadbitter transferred to Championship club Ipswich Town for a fee of £2.6 million, along with team-mate Carlos Edwards. He made his first-appearance on 12 September, starting in a 3–1 loss to Middlesbrough. He scored his first goal for the club against Nottingham Forest on 15 September, netting the opening goal in a 1–1 draw. Leadbitter became a first-team regular during his first season at Portman Road, making 40 appearances in all competitions and scoring 3 goals.

He continued to feature as a regular in the first-team during the 2010–11 season. He scored his first goal of the season on 21 August in a 2–1 away win over Crystal Palace. He made 50 appearances over the course of the season, scoring 6 goals, including a brace in a 3–3 home draw with Middlesbrough at Portman Road.

Leadbitter was named club captain for the 2011–12 season, following the departure of David Norris. On 10 March, he scored a brace as Ipswich came from behind to draw 2–2 with Hull City. Following a spell on the sidelines due to injury, Ipswich manager Paul Jewell gave the captain's armband to Carlos Edwards, who remained as the captain for the remainder of the season. He made 36 appearances during the 2011–12 season, scoring 5 goals.

=== Middlesbrough ===
On 29 May 2012, it was announced that Leadbitter had signed a three-year contract with Championship club Middlesbrough, on a free transfer, following the expiry of his contract at Ipswich Town. Leadbitter scored on his debut in a 7–3 pre-season friendly win against Falkirk. He scored his first league goal on 30 November 2012 in a 2–3 away defeat against Birmingham City. Leadbitter scored twice as Boro lost 3–2 away to Wolverhampton Wanderers in March 2013. After a string of consistent performances throughout the 2012–13 season, Leadbitter was awarded Middlesbrough's player of the season in his first season at the club. Leadbitter scored his fourth goal for Middlesbrough on 25 August 2013 at Wigan. On 21 September 2013, he scored Boro's final goal in a 3–3 draw at home to Bournemouth. On 19 December 2014 Leadbitter agreed a 3-year contract extension with the club. Leadbitter's commanding performances and selection of spectacular goals lead to him being named in the Championship PFA Team of the Year.

On 7 May 2016, Leadbitter won promotion to the Premier League with Middlesbrough after a 1–1 draw at home against Brighton & Hove Albion.

=== Return to Sunderland ===
Leadbitter re-signed for Sunderland on a free transfer in January 2019. He was named captain at the start of the 2019–20 season. In February 2020, he was given an extended leave of absence from the club for personal reasons, returning for pre-season in July. On 25 May 2021 it was announced that he would leave Sunderland at the end of the season, following the expiry of his contract. On 14 September 2021 Leadbitter announced his retirement from football, most notably winning the EFL Trophy with the club in his final season.

== International career ==
Leadbitter came on as a late substitute replacing Gabriel Agbonlahor, in a 2–0 win in England Under 21s 2009 UEFA European Under-21 Championship qualification group, against Bulgaria. He featured again for England U21 on 25 March 2008 and made his final appearance in a 0–0 draw against Poland U21, not being picked after that and turning 23 soon after.

== Career statistics ==
Appearances and goals by club, season and competition
Club	Season	League			FA Cup		League Cup		Other		Total	
Club	Season	Division	Apps	Goals	Apps	Goals	Apps	Goals	Apps	Goals	Apps	Goals
Sunderland	2003–04	First Division	0	0	0	0	1	0	0	0	1	0
Sunderland	2004–05	Championship	0	0	0	0	1	0	—		1	0
Sunderland	2005–06	Premier League	12	0	0	0	0	0	—		12	0
Sunderland	2006–07	Championship	44	7	1	0	1	0	—		46	7
Sunderland	2007–08	Premier League	31	2	1	0	1	0	—		33	2
Sunderland	2008–09	Premier League	23	2	2	0	3	0	—		28	2
Sunderland	2009–10	Premier League	1	0	—		1	0	—		2	0
Sunderland	Total		111	11	4	0	8	0	—		123	11
Rotherham United (loan)	2005–06	League One	5	1	1	0	—		1 (Note: Appearance in Football League Trophy)	0	7	1
Ipswich Town	2009–10	Championship	38	3	2	0	—		—		40	3
Ipswich Town	2010–11	Championship	44	5	0	0	6	1	—		50	6
Ipswich Town	2011–12	Championship	34	5	1	0	1	0	—		36	5
Ipswich Town	Total		116	13	3	0	7	1	—		126	14
Middlesbrough	2012–13	Championship	42	3	2	0	3	1	—		47	4
Middlesbrough	2013–14	Championship	39	6	1	0	1	0	—		41	6
Middlesbrough	2014–15	Championship	43	11	3	0	2	1	3 (Note: Appearances in Championship play-offs)	0	51	12
Middlesbrough	2015–16	Championship	41	4	0	0	5	0	—		46	4
Middlesbrough	2016–17	Premier League	13	1	4	2	0	0	—		17	3
Middlesbrough	2017–18	Championship	32	3	1	0	1	0	—		34	3
Middlesbrough	2018–19	Championship	2	0	1	0	5	0	—		8	0
Middlesbrough	Total		212	28	12	2	17	2	3	0	244	32
Sunderland	2018–19	League One	15	0	—		—		4 (Note: Two appearances in EFL Trophy, two in League One play-offs)	0	19	0
Sunderland	2019–20	League One	14	0	1	0	2	0	3 (Note: Appearances in EFL Trophy)	0	20	0
Sunderland	2020–21	League One	40	7	0	0	0	0	8 (Note: Six appearances in EFL Trophy, two in League One play-offs)	0	48	7
Sunderland	Total		69	7	1	0	2	0	15	0	87	7
Sunderland	Sunderland Total		180	18	5	0	10	0	15	0	210	18
Career total			513	60	21	2	34	3	17	0	586	65

== Honours ==
Sunderland

- Football League Championship: 2006–07
- EFL Trophy: 2020–21; runner-up: 2018–19

Middlesbrough

- Football League Championship runner-up: 2015–16

Individual

- Middlesbrough Player of the Year: 2012–13
- PFA Team of the Year: 2014–15 Championship
