= Cameron Park (footballer) =

English footballer

Personal information
- Full name: Cameron Park
- Date of birth: 6 July 1992 (age 34)
- Place of birth: Marske-by-the-Sea, England
- Height: 5 ft 10 in (1.78 m)
- Position: Winger

Team information
- Current team: Whitby Town

Senior career*
Years	Team	Apps	(Gls)
2010–2014	Middlesbrough	4	(0)
2011	→ Barnsley (loan)	3	(0)
2014	→ Crewe Alexandra (loan)	4	(0)
2014	Marske United		
2015-2016	Whitby Town		

International career
2010	Scotland U19	1	(0)
2012	Scotland U21	1	(0)
- * Club domestic league appearances and goals as of 09:32, 19 November 2020 (UTC)

Cameron Park (born 6 July 1992) is a former professional footballer who last played for Whitby Town as a winger in 2016, having started his career at Middlesbrough.

Cameron is now one of the owners of the business Football Mastery - https://footballmastery.co.uk/ which provides football coaching equipment.

== Career ==
Park's natural position is as a left winger, following on from Middlesbrough's former youth products, Stewart Downing and Adam Johnson. He was considered a bright prospect from Middlesbrough's academy. He signed a four-and-a-half-year professional contract in December 2010. Park made his debut for Middlesbrough on 15 January 2011 as a substitute in a 4–0 away win over Bristol City. On 23 August 2011 Park joined Championship rivals Barnsley on a three-month loan, making three appearances. Park scored his only goal for Boro on 28 August 2012, against Gillingham in Middlesbrough's 2–0 win in the League Cup, a chip in the 90th minute.

Park was selected by the Scotland national under-21 football team in August 2012.

On 27 February 2014, Park joined League One side Crewe Alexandra on a one-month loan.

Park was released from his contract with Middlesbrough on 16 May 2014. He subsequently played for his home town club, Marske United, then joined Whitby Town. He was released by Whitby in October 2016, but later had a trial with the same club, playing against Middlesbrough's under-23s in a pre-season friendly on 28 July 2018.

== Career statistics ==
As of 19 November 2020

Club performance			League		FA Cup		League Cup		Total	
Season	Club	League	Apps	Goals	Apps	Goals	Apps	Goals	Apps	Goals
2010-11	Middlesbrough	Championship	4	0	0	0	0	0	4	0
2011-12	Middlesbrough	Championship	0	0	0	0	1	0	1	0
2011-12	Middlesbrough	Championship	0	0	0	0	1	1	1	1
Middlesbrough total			4	0	0	0	2	1	6	1
2011-12	Barnsley (loan)	Championship	3	0	0	0	0	0	3	0
2013-14	Crewe Alexandra (loan)	League One	4	0	0	0	0	0	4	0
Career total			11	0	0	0	2	1	13	1
