= John Kennedy (disambiguation) =

John F. Kennedy (1917–1963) was the 35th president of the US from 1961 to 1963.

John Kennedy also commonly refers to:

- John Kennedy (Louisiana politician) (born 1951), US Senator from Louisiana
- John F. Kennedy Jr. (1960–1999), American political-family member and journalist, son of President John F. Kennedy

John Kennedy may also refer to:

== Artists and entertainers ==
- John Kennedy (Australian musician) (born 1958)
- John Kennedy (cellist) (1922–1980), Australian musician
- John Kennedy (Irish songwriter) (fl. 1968, 2009), songwriter
- John Kennedy (American musician) (fl. 1987)
- John Kennedy (fl. 1620s), English author of the 1626 poem Calanthrop and Lucilla
- John Kennedy (puppeteer) (born 1967), American puppeteer
- John Kennedy (radio broadcaster) (born 1965), British radio DJ and podcast host
- John Arthur Kennedy (1914–1990), American actor
- John Kennedy Toole (1937–1969), American novelist
- John Michael Kennedy, film director, screenwriter, and producer

== Sportspeople ==
=== Association football ===
- John Kennedy (footballer, born 2000), Brazilian football forward
- John Kennedy (footballer, born 2002), Brazilian football forward
- John Kennedy (English footballer) (born 1978), footballer for Bury Town
- John Kennedy (Northern Irish footballer) (born 1939), football goalkeeper
- John Kennedy (Scottish footballer) (born 1983), Scottish footballer and manager

=== Other football ===
- John Kennedy (Dublin Gaelic footballer) (fl. 1891–1894), Irish Gaelic footballer
- John Kennedy (Canadian football) (born 1950)
- John Kennedy Jr. (footballer) (born 1959), Australian rules footballer
- John Kennedy (Kerry Gaelic footballer) (fl. 1984–2010), Gaelic football player and manager
- John Kennedy Sr. (footballer) (1928–2020), Australian football player and coach

=== Other sports ===
- John Kennedy (canoeist) (fl. 1970s), American canoeist
- John Kennedy (cricketer) (1931–2023), English cricketer
- John Kennedy (cyclist) (1931–1989), British cyclist
- John Kennedy (hurler) (born 1964), Irish hurler
- John Kennedy (racing driver) (fl. 1970s), American racing driver
- John Kennedy (rowing) (1900–1971), American coxswain
- John Kennedy (shortstop) (1926–1998), American Major League Baseball player
- John Kennedy (third baseman) (1941–2018), American Major League Baseball player
- John Kennedy (rugby union), Irish international rugby union player

== Politicians and public servants ==
=== United States ===
- John Alexander Kennedy (1803–1873), New York City superintendent of police
- John A. Kennedy (Illinois politician) (1921–1997), member of the Illinois House of Representatives
- John B. Kennedy (politician) (died 1983), American city manager and politician
- John F. Kennedy (Georgia politician) (born 1965), Georgia state senator
- John Francis Kennedy (politician) (1905–1994), treasurer of Massachusetts
- John J. Kennedy (New York State Treasurer) (c. 1857 – 1914), American businessman and politician
- John J. Kennedy (political scientist), American political scientist
- John L. Kennedy (1854–1946), politician and jurist
- John M. Kennedy Jr. (fl. 2004–present), New York politician
- John P. Kennedy (1795–1870), American politician, Secretary of the Navy and novelist
- John Paul Kennedy (fl. 1966–2015), American judge
- John Kennedy (Oklahoma politician), former Oklahoma Secretary of State
- John Kennedy (Pennsylvania politician) (born 1938), member of the Pennsylvania House of Representatives
- John Kennedy (Utah politician) (1847–1928), Utah House of Representatives

=== Other countries ===
- John Kennedy (Manitoba politician) (1867–1927), Canadian politician
- John Wilfred Kennedy (1879–1949), Canadian politician
- John Kennedy (public servant) (1884–?), Australian public servant, Controller-General of the Department of Trade and Customs
- John William Kennedy (born 1910), Northern Ireland politician
- John Kennedy (Australian politician) (born 1947), Victorian (Australia) politician

== Clergy and religious leaders ==
- John Kennedy (theologian) (1813–1900), British religious leader and author
- John Kennedy of Dingwall (1819–1884), Free Church of Scotland minister
- John Kennedy of Killearnan (1772–1841), Scottish minister of the Church of Scotland
- John Joseph Kennedy (born 1968), Irish Catholic prelate and Secretary of the Dicastery for the Doctrine of the Faith

== Soldiers ==
- John Kennedy (Medal of Honor) (1834–1910), American soldier
- John Doby Kennedy (1840–1896), general in the Confederate States Army during the American Civil War
- John J. Kennedy (Republic of Texas politician) (1814–1880), soldier, lawyer and sheriff
- Sir John Kennedy (British Army officer, born 1878) (1878–1948), British general
- Sir John Kennedy (British Army officer, born 1893) (1893–1970), British general
- John Pitt Kennedy (1796–1879), British military engineer
- John Thomas Kennedy (1885–1969), American soldier
- Sir John Charles Kennedy, 3rd Baronet (1856–1923), Irish soldier

== Other people ==
- John Kennedy (1759–1842), English nurseryman, of Lee and Kennedy
- John Kennedy, 2nd Lord Kennedy (before 1454–c. 1508/9), Scottish lord
- John Kennedy, 5th Earl of Cassilis (1575–1615), Scottish peer
- John Kennedy, 6th Earl of Cassilis (died 1668), Scottish peer
- John Kennedy, 7th Earl of Cassilis (1653–1701), Scottish peer
- John Kennedy, 8th Earl of Cassilis (1700–1759), Scottish peer
- Sir John Kennedy (engineer) (1838–1921), Canadian civil engineer
- John Kennedy (journalist) (1926–1994), New Zealand newspaper editor and political analyst
- John Kennedy (manufacturer) (1769–1855), Scottish-born textile manufacturer in Manchester, UK
- John Kennedy (music industry executive) (born 1953), British entertainment lawyer
- John B. Kennedy (journalist) (1894–1961), American journalist
- John David Kennedy (born 1943), chemist and professor of inorganic chemistry at the University of Leeds, UK
- John E. Kennedy (1864–1928), Canadian-American advertising copywriter
- John Fitzgerald Kennedy, man convicted of the murder of Thomas and Jackie Hawks
- Sir John Gordon Kennedy (1836–1912), British diplomat
- John Pendleton Kennedy (librarian) (1871–1944), first State Librarian for Virginia
- John Stewart Kennedy (1830–1909), Scottish-born American entrepreneur and philanthropist
- J. S. Kennedy (John Stodart Kennedy, 1912–1993), British zoologist

== Fictional characters ==
- John Kennedy (The Inbetweeners), in the 2009–2010 British sitcom

== Other uses ==
- USS John P. Kennedy, a supply ship of the US Navy

== See also ==
- Jonny Kennedy (1966–2003), British patient
- Jack Kennedy (disambiguation)
- John F. Kennedy (disambiguation)
- List of memorials to John F. Kennedy, list of things named after President John F. Kennedy
- USS Kennedy, list of US sailing ships
- Jack Schlossberg (John Kennedy Schlossberg, born 1993), grandson of the president
- Angus John Kennedy, Canadian politician
