= Jason Steele (footballer) =

English footballer (born 1990)

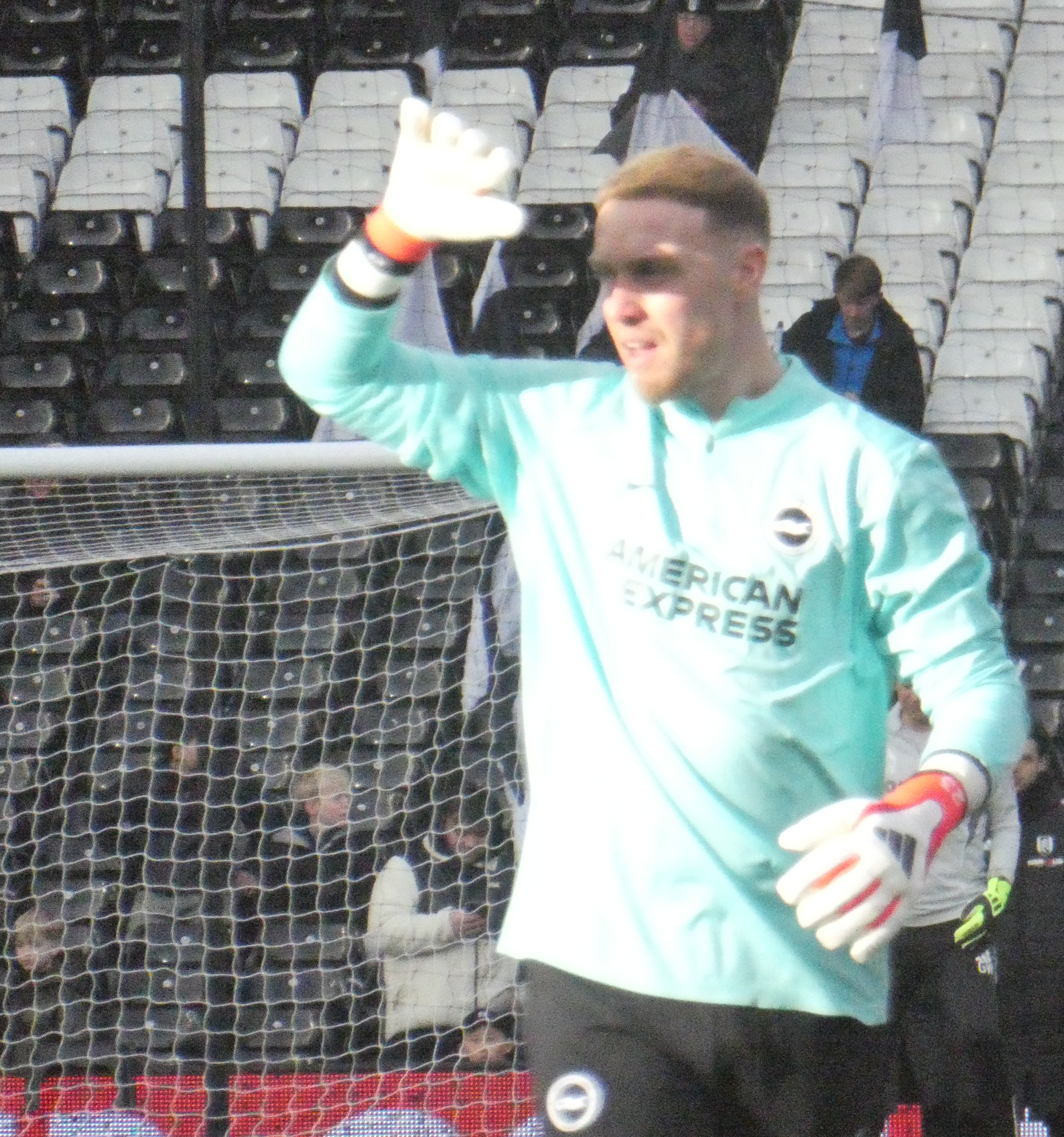
- Steele in 2026

Personal information
- Full name: Jason Sean Steele
- Date of birth: 18 August 1990 (age 36)
- Place of birth: Newton Aycliffe, England
- Height: 6 ft 2 in (1.88 m)
- Position: Goalkeeper

Team information
- Current team: Brighton & Hove Albion
- Number: 23

Youth career
- –2007: Middlesbrough

Senior career*
Years	Team	Apps	(Gls)
2007–2015	Middlesbrough	131	(0)
2010	→ Northampton Town (loan)	13	(0)
2014	→ Blackburn Rovers (loan)	31	(0)
2015–2017	Blackburn Rovers	82	(0)
2017–2018	Sunderland	15	(0)
2018–	Brighton & Hove Albion	35	(0)

International career^{‡}
2006	England U16	1	(0)
2006–2007	England U17	10	(0)
2007–2009	England U19	16	(0)
2010–2013	England U21	7	(0)
2012	Great Britain Olympic	1	(0)
Medal record
Men's football
Representing England
FIFA World Cup
Third place	2026 Canada–Mexico–United States
UEFA European Under-19 Championship
Runner-up	2009 Ukraine
- * Club domestic league appearances and goals as of 08:28, 17 September 2026 (UTC) ‡ National team caps and goals as of 20 March 2026

Jason Sean Steele (born 18 August 1990) is an English professional footballer who plays as a goalkeeper for Premier League club Brighton & Hove Albion.

Steele progressed through Middlesbrough's youth system, signing his first professional contract with the Premier League club in 2009. He made his professional footballing debut while on loan at League Two side Northampton Town during the 2009–10 season. Steele made his Middlesbrough debut in the 2010–11 Championship season, eventually becoming first-choice goalkeeper. Steele represented England at all youth levels, and has been in the squad for the senior team (without ever appearing in a match for them). He was called up for the Great Britain Olympic team at the London 2012 Summer Olympic Games, making a singular appearance against Brazil. Steele left Middlesbrough at the end of the 2013–14 season after losing his place in the starting lineup.

At the start of the 2014–15 season, Steele joined Championship club Blackburn Rovers on loan. He signed for them permanently during the 2015 winter transfer window. He established himself as their first-choice goalkeeper in the 2016–17 season, Blackburn were relegated to League One, which culminated in Steele's departure to Championship side Sunderland.

He left Sunderland after one season, joining Brighton & Hove Albion in the Premier League. Serving as back-up, he eventually made his Premier League debut in November 2021.

== Early life ==
Steele was born in Newton Aycliffe, County Durham. He attended Woodham Community Technology College (now named Woodham Academy), the same school as his former Middlesbrough teammate Ross Turnbull.

== Club career ==
=== Middlesbrough ===
He came through Middlesbrough's youth academy. In May 2009, Steele signed a new three-year contract with Middlesbrough, which was his first professional contract. Danny Coyne was signed during Middlesbrough's first season in the Championship in the 2009–10 season, instead of promoting Steele to a permanent senior squad member. He was sent out on loan to Northampton Town in February 2010, to gain first team experience. He kept four clean sheets in 13 matches.

Thanks to his impressive stint at Northampton, Steele was handed his first competitive start for Middlesbrough in a 2–1 victory over Chesterfield in the League Cup, on 10 August 2010. He made his league debut away to Leicester City on 14 August 2010 and capped it with a clean sheet in a 0–0 draw. With the sale of Brad Jones to Liverpool, Steele went on to establish himself as Middlesbrough's first-choice goalkeeper, ahead of Danny Coyne. In December 2010, he signed a new contract with Middlesbrough up to 2015. Due to a side muscle injury he picked up against Reading in March 2011, Nottingham Forest goalkeeper Paul Smith was brought in to cover for Steele. Despite impressive performances from Smith, Steele regained his first-team spot for the last two matches of the 2010–11 season, in which he kept clean sheets in both games against Cardiff City and Doncaster Rovers.

In the 2011–12 season, he fully established himself as Middlesbrough's first-choice goalkeeper. Despite Wolverhampton Wanderers goalkeeper Carl Ikeme being brought in on loan at the start of the season, due to a broken wrist for Steele, he quickly regained his first-team place. Steele went on to win the Young Player of the Year award for the 2011–12 season.

He started the 2012–13 season well, putting in man-of-the-match performances against Ipswich Town (in which he got an assist), Watford and Brighton & Hove Albion. He continued his good form into 2013, saving a penalty against Blackpool when the score was at 3–2, and Middlesbrough went on to win the match 4–2. Steele's impressive form during the 2012/13 season, as well as his form in the previous season, was rewarded when he was named the North East Football Writers' Young player of the Year in February 2013. He finished the season being the only player to have played in every minute of Middlesbrough's league campaign. Steele also won both the Young Player and Player of the Season awards which was picked by both his teammates and staff at the club.

=== Blackburn Rovers ===
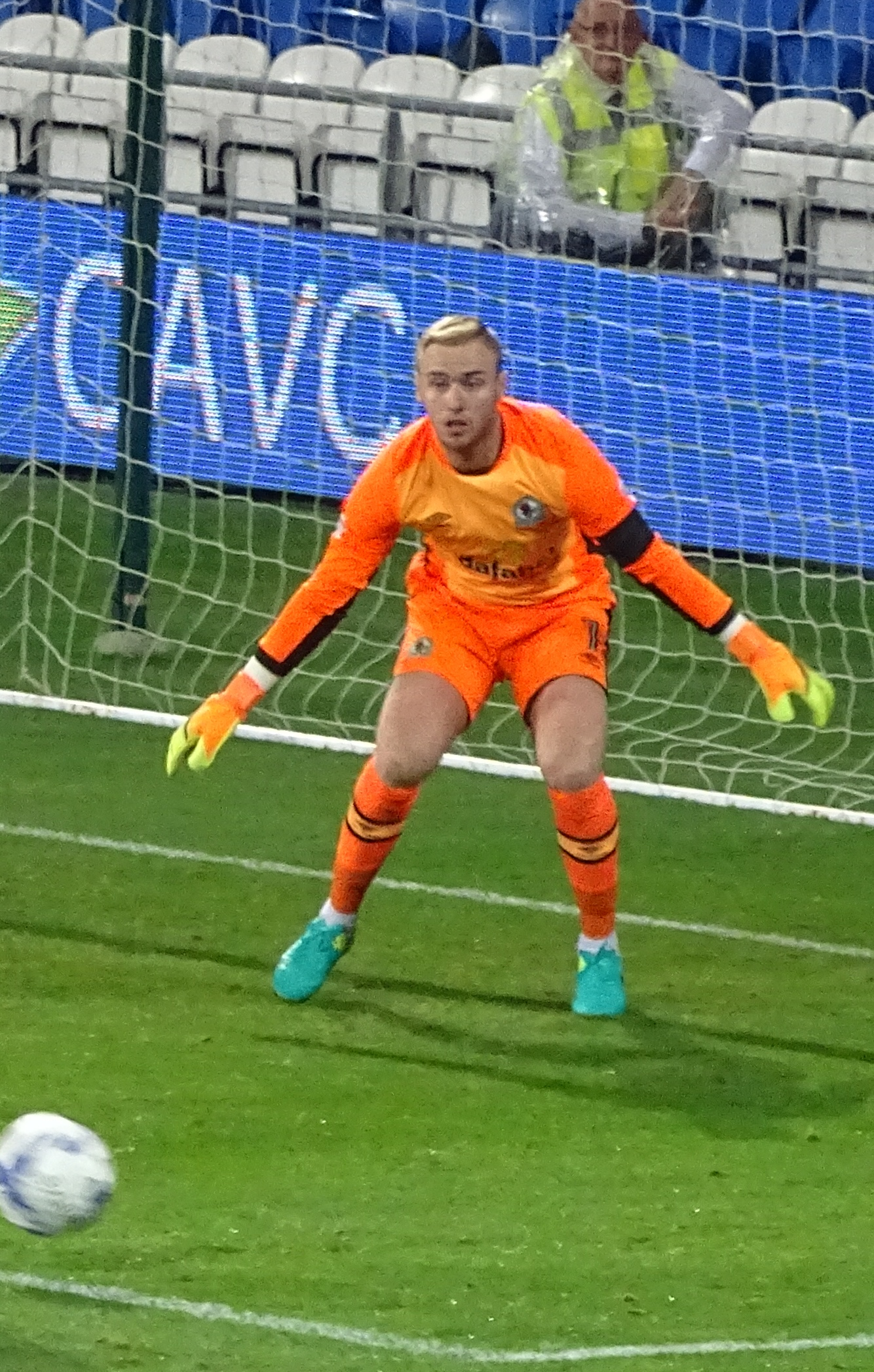
Steele playing for Blackburn Rovers in 2016

On 1 September 2014, Steele joined Championship club Blackburn Rovers on a season-long loan. He made his debut on 20 September 2014 in a 1–0 win away to Fulham. Steele quickly made an impact, which included him establishing himself as first-choice goalkeeper and making 15 league appearances during his initial loan spell. On 31 December 2014, Steele signed a permanent deal with Blackburn for an undisclosed fee, signing a three-and-a-half-year deal. At the end of the 2014–15 season, Steele made 31 appearances.

In the 2015–16 season, Steele made 41 appearances in the Championship, it was David Raya who played the other 5 matches that league campaign. That season saw Blackburn finish fifteenth, 15 points adrift from the relegation zone, as well as a managerial change occurring which saw heavily-experienced Premier League coach Paul Lambert replace Gary Bowyer. Steele was notable for his singular assist and yellow card during that Championship league campaign.

Similar playing statistics occurred the following season, in which Steele played 41 times in the Championship whereas Raya appeared 5 times. In a high points-scoring season from all 24 teams in the league, Blackburn suffered relegation to League One, finishing the Championship campaign with 51 points, only qualifying for relegation on a goal difference by 2 goals: Blackburn finishing on −12 and Nottingham Forest finishing on −10. His final game for Blackburn was a 2–0 defeat to Barnsley at Ewood Park on 8 April 2017.

=== Sunderland ===
Steele signed for newly relegated Championship club Sunderland on 26 July 2017 on a four-year contract for an undisclosed fee, reported to be in the region of £500,000. Steele made his official league debut against Derby County on 4 August, in which they recorded a 1–1 draw in the first game of the 2017–18 season. Prior to that, Steele had been between the posts in a heavy 5–0 defeat to Celtic in a pre season friendly at the Stadium of Light, in which he was criticised alongside his teammates due to their disappointing performance, which saw Sunderland bring in Robbin Ruiter to compete with Steele for the first-choice goalkeeper role.

In the winter transfer window, Steele was set to join fellow Championship side Derby County on loan, after Sunderland allowed the goalkeeper to leave on transfer deadline day following the signing of Lee Camp from Cardiff City on loan. The deal would have seen Steele join the Rams on loan until the end of the season with an obligation to a permanent deal if the club were to achieve promotion to the Premier League. However, Derby had decided to change the deal at the last minute, in which they were unprepared to complete a permanent deal, which suddenly resulted in the deal falling through.

After a very disappointing season, Sunderland were relegated to League One on 21 April 2018. This meant that Steele had suffered two consecutive relegations as a player while Sunderland had suffered from two consecutive relegations as a club. That season saw Steele appear for the club 15 times in the Championship. The club's season was followed in the production of a Netflix documentary, Sunderland 'Til I Die, released on 14 December 2018. In the documentary, Steele explained that being a professional footballer resulted in many people putting pressure on himself and the entire squad to perform at their best.

=== Brighton & Hove Albion ===
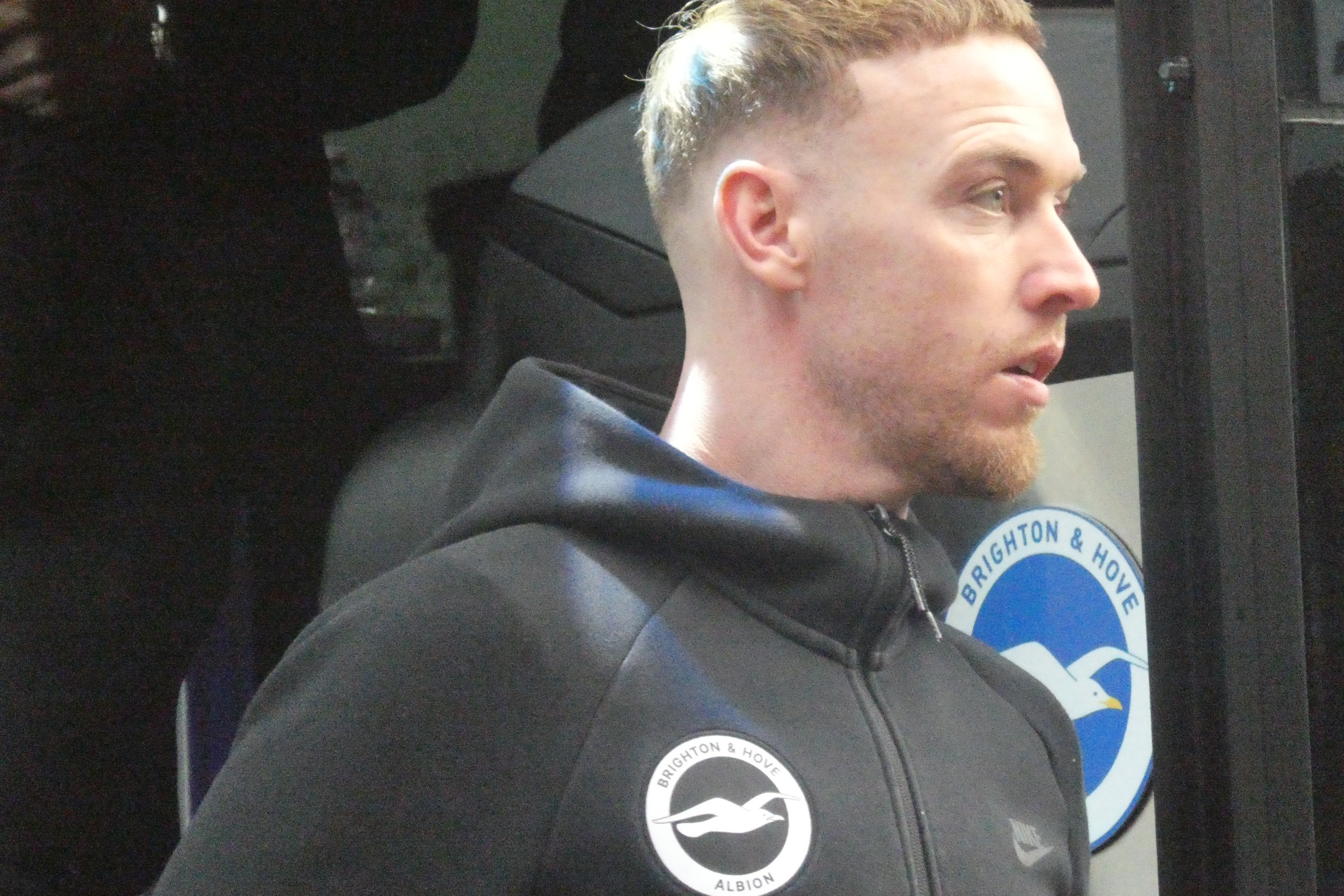
Steele with Brighton & Hove Albion in 2026

Steele signed for Premier League club Brighton & Hove Albion on 21 June 2018 on a three-year contract for an undisclosed fee. Steele eventually made his Brighton debut on 5 January 2019, in the 3–1 away win against AFC Bournemouth in the FA Cup third round.

His next appearance for Brighton came 20 months after his debut, playing and keeping a clean sheet in a 4–0 home victory over Portsmouth in the EFL Cup on 17 September 2020. Six days later he made another appearance again keeping a clean sheet in another EFL Cup tie, this time a 2–0 away win over Preston North End. However, his run in the league cup was ended on 30 September after a 3–0 home loss against Manchester United falling short of a quarter final place. His next match came on 10 January 2021, where he saved four penalties in a 4–3 penalty shootout win over Newport County – after finishing 1–1 in 120 minutes of play – in the FA Cup third round. Near the end of normal play, Steele mistimed a cross which landed onto teammate Adam Webster conceding an own goal in the 96th minute taking it to extra time. A day later Steele extended his Brighton contract signing on until June 2023.

He captained the side for the first time and kept a clean sheet in Brighton's 2–0 EFL Cup second round away victory at Cardiff City on 24 August 2021. Steele made his Premier League debut at the age of 31, after three years at the Albion, replacing the suspended Robert Sánchez in the away fixture at Aston Villa on 20 November, where Brighton lost 2–0.

Steele made two crucial saves in a 3–1 away victory against Arsenal in the EFL Cup third round on 9 November 2022. On 7 January 2023, Steele played in a 5–1 away win over his former club Middlesbrough to go through to the FA Cup fourth round. Three days later, it was confirmed by Brighton that Steele had signed a new contract with the club, committing his future in Sussex until June 2025. Roberto De Zerbi was eager for Steele to stay at the club with the goalkeeper stating that signing a new contract was an easy decision. On 29 January, Steele was chosen to play over Sánchez where Brighton went on to defeat the defending champions Liverpool 2–1 at home in the fourth round of the FA Cup. He was selected ahead of the Spanish goalkeeper again on 4 March, this time in a Premier League tie at home against West Ham United. This was Steele's second Premier League appearance of his career – his first coming in November 2021 – keeping his first top flight clean sheet and making some crucial saves a 4–0 win. Steele was giving an extended run of game time, with De Zerbi saying he was "sad for Robert" [Sánchez] but that Steele is "playing better" and "maybe he is closer than Robert in my style." After a 2–2 away draw against Leeds United on 11 March, he earned his second clean sheet four days later, in his second Premier League game at Falmer Stadium in a 1–0 home win over Crystal Palace.

On 1 April 2023, Steele assisted Kaoru Mitoma's equaliser – Brighton's first of three – with the Japanese international racing onto his long ball and scoring in the eventual 3–3 home draw against Brentford. Steele was ruled out of the 2–1 victory at Chelsea on 15 April due to a minor injury and was benched for the FA Cup semi-final on the 23 April in which Brighton lost on penalties at Wembley against Manchester United. He made his return to action three days later, where he made his first penalty save in the Premier League keeping out Brennan Johnson's effort, but later conceded a Morgan Gibbs-White penalty in the 3–1 loss at Nottingham Forest. On 8 May, Steele scored his first Premier League own goal in a 5–1 defeat against Everton at Falmer Stadium. He continued as number one goalkeeper for Brighton playing in the remaining matches of the season as Brighton finished sixth, qualifying for the 2023–24 UEFA Europa League, their first ever European qualification.

== International career ==
=== England youth ===
Steele was born in England and is of Scottish descent. He has competed for the England under-16s, under-17s and under-19s. He joined the under-19s in September 2007, a month after his 17th birthday. In July 2009, Steele competed as starting goalkeeper for England under-19s in the 2009 UEFA European Under-19 Championship in Ukraine. Steele captained the team against the hosts, Ukraine.

Steele made his first under-21s appearance on 16 November 2010, in a 2–0 away defeat to Germany in a friendly. He was sent off after 58 minutes after fouling Boris Vukčević, having only come on as a half-time substitute. His second appearance for the under-21s came almost two years later on 10 September 2012 as a starter in a 2013 UEFA European Under-21 Championship qualification match against Norway, in which he kept a clean sheet in a 1–0 win.

Steele was named in the 23-man squad for the 2013 UEFA European Under-21 Championship. He made one appearance at the tournament, playing in a 1–0 defeat to Israel in England's last group match. He made seven appearances for the under-21s from 2010 to 2013.

=== Great Britain Olympic ===
Steele was named in the 18-man Great Britain squad for the 2012 Summer Olympics in London. He started in a friendly against Brazil before the tournament, playing the first half of a 2–0 defeat at the Riverside Stadium. He was the only member of the squad to not play during the tournament, with Jack Butland keeping him out of the team, and was an unused substitute in all four matches as Great Britain reached the quarter-final.

=== England senior ===
In March 2026, Steele received his first call-up to the England senior squad, ahead of friendlies against Uruguay and Japan. He was included in England's travelling party to the 2026 FIFA World Cup as a training goalkeeper. England finished third, and the squad gave him one of the bronze medals despite him not officially being part of it.

In September 2026, Steele received a call-up to the 2026-27 UEFA Nations League. He would receive another call-up in November, also for the Nations League.

== Personal life ==
In the documentary series Sunderland 'Til I Die, it was shown that Steele has two sons. Steele is related to fellow footballer Lewis Wing who plays for Reading; he too is a former Middlesbrough player, but their spells at the club did not overlap.

== Career statistics ==
=== Club ===
As of match played 28 October 2026

Appearances and goals by club, season and competition
Club	Season	League			FA Cup		League Cup		Europe		Other		Total	
Club	Season	Division	Apps	Goals	Apps	Goals	Apps	Goals	Apps	Goals	Apps	Goals	Apps	Goals
Middlesbrough	2007–08	Premier League	0	0	0	0	0	0	—		—		0	0
Middlesbrough	2008–09	Premier League	0	0	0	0	0	0	—		—		0	0
Middlesbrough	2009–10	Championship	0	0	0	0	0	0	—		—		0	0
Middlesbrough	2010–11	Championship	35	0	0	0	2	0	—		—		37	0
Middlesbrough	2011–12	Championship	34	0	2	0	0	0	—		—		36	0
Middlesbrough	2012–13	Championship	46	0	3	0	4	0	—		—		53	0
Middlesbrough	2013–14	Championship	16	0	0	0	0	0	—		—		16	0
Middlesbrough	2014–15	Championship	0	0	—		0	0	—		—		0	0
Middlesbrough	Total		131	0	5	0	6	0	—		—		142	0
Northampton Town (loan)	2009–10	League Two	13	0	—		—		—		—		13	0
Blackburn Rovers	2014–15	Championship	31	0	0	0	—		—		—		31	0
Blackburn Rovers	2015–16	Championship	41	0	3	0	1	0	—		—		45	0
Blackburn Rovers	2016–17	Championship	41	0	2	0	1	0	—		—		44	0
Blackburn Rovers	Total		113	0	5	0	2	0	—		—		120	0
Sunderland	2017–18	Championship	15	0	1	0	2	0	—		—		18	0
Brighton & Hove Albion	2018–19	Premier League	0	0	1	0	0	0	—		—		1	0
Brighton & Hove Albion	2019–20	Premier League	0	0	0	0	0	0	—		—		0	0
Brighton & Hove Albion	2020–21	Premier League	0	0	1	0	3	0	—		—		4	0
Brighton & Hove Albion	2021–22	Premier League	1	0	0	0	3	0	—		—		4	0
Brighton & Hove Albion	2022–23	Premier League	15	0	3	0	3	0	—		—		21	0
Brighton & Hove Albion	2023–24	Premier League	17	0	1	0	0	0	5 (Note: Appearances in UEFA Europa League)	0	—		23	0
Brighton & Hove Albion	2024–25	Premier League	2	0	1	0	2	0	—		—		5	0
Brighton & Hove Albion	2025–26	Premier League	0	0	2	0	3	0	—		—		5	0
Brighton & Hove Albion	2026–27	Premier League	0	0	0	0	2	0	0	0	—		2	0
Brighton & Hove Albion	Total		35	0	9	0	15	0	5	0	—		64	0
Brighton & Hove Albion; Reserves & Academy	2018–19	—			—		—		—		1 (Note: Appearance(s) in EFL Trophy)	0	1	0
Brighton & Hove Albion; Reserves & Academy	2019–20	—			—		—		—		3	0	3	0
Brighton & Hove Albion; Reserves & Academy	Total		—		—		—		—		4	0	4	0
Career total			307	0	20	0	26	0	5	0	4	0	362	0

== Honours ==
England U19

- UEFA European Under-19 Championship runner-up: 2009
