= Jon Kennedy =

Jon Kennedy may refer to:

- Jon Kennedy (baseball), Australian baseball pitcher
- Jon Kennedy (footballer), English footballer

== See also ==
- Jonny Kennedy, British man with rare inherited condition known as dystrophic epidermolysis bullosa
- John Kennedy (disambiguation)
