= Apostle of the North =

Apostle of the North is a term applied to several religious people:

- Ansgar (801–865), archbishop of Hamburg-Bremen
- Bernard Gilpin (1517–1583), English cleric
- Hyacinth of Poland (c.1185–1257), Polish priest
- John Macdonald (Apostle of the North) (1779–1849), minister of the Church of Scotland
  - The Apostle of the North, a biography of Macdonald by John Kennedy of Dingwall

== See also ==
- Johannes Bugenhagen (1485–1558), German Lutheran reformer known as the "Second Apostle of the North"
- Rimbert (830–888), archbishop of Hamburg-Bremen known as the "Second Apostle of the North"
- Unni (bishop), archbishop of Hamburg-Bremen (916–936) and missionary in Sweden known as the "Third Apostle of the North"
