= Bryan Oviedo =

Costa Rican footballer (born 1990)

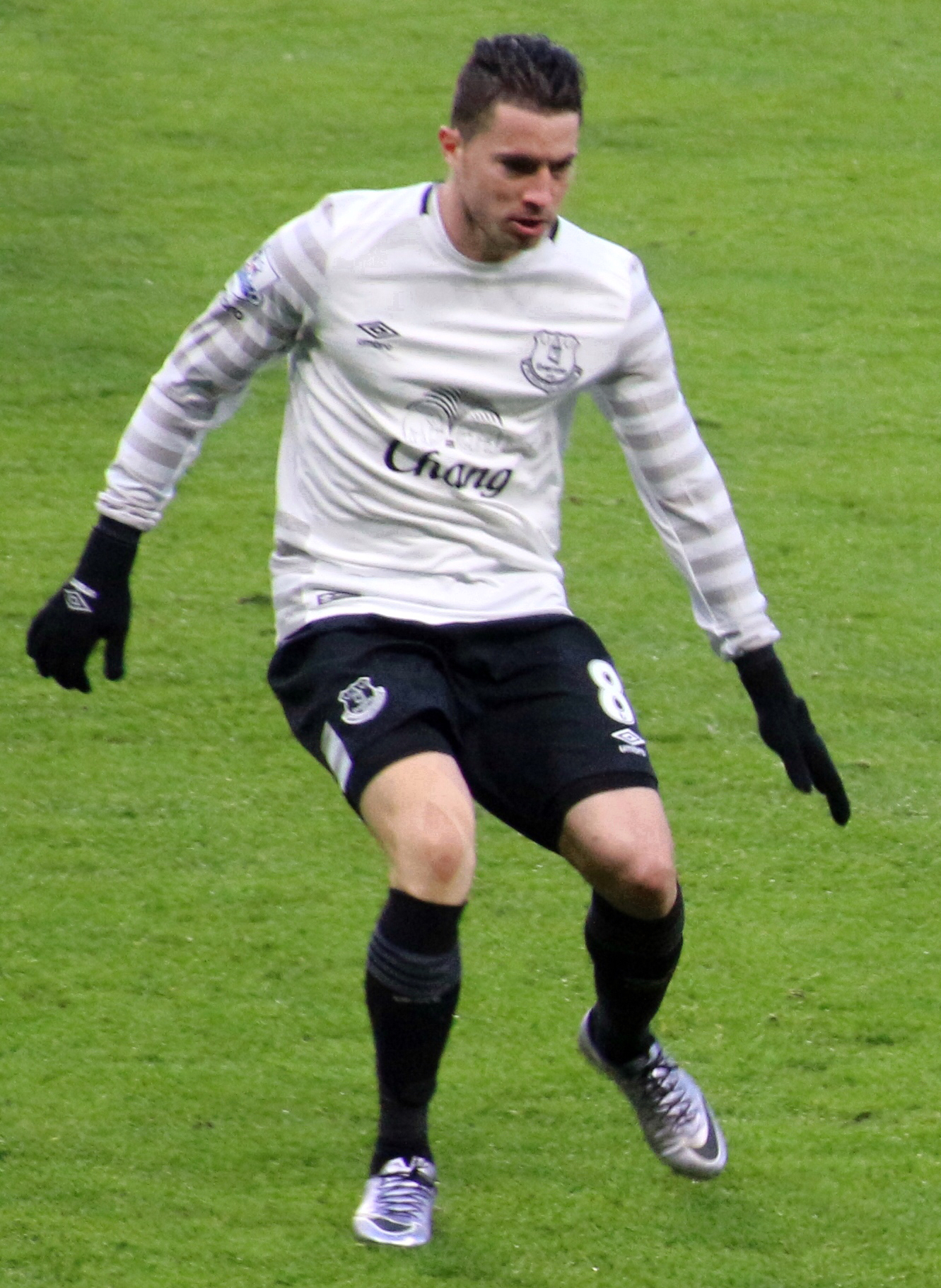
- Oviedo playing for Everton in 2016

Personal information
- Full name: Bryan Josué Oviedo Jiménez
- Date of birth: 18 February 1990 (age 36)
- Place of birth: San José, Costa Rica
- Height: 1.72 m (5 ft 8 in)
- Positions: Left-back; left midfielder

Youth career
- Saprissa

Senior career*
Years	Team	Apps	(Gls)
2009–2010	Saprissa	7	(0)
2010–2012	Copenhagen	30	(2)
2011	→ Nordsjælland (loan)	14	(0)
2012–2017	Everton	50	(2)
2017–2019	Sunderland	70	(2)
2019–2022	Copenhagen	22	(0)
2022–2024	Real Salt Lake	46	(0)
2024–2025	Alajuelense	32	(1)
2025	San Carlos	7	(0)

International career^{‡}
2009	Costa Rica U20	6	(0)
2010–2023	Costa Rica	81	(2)
Medal record
Representing Costa Rica
Gold medal – first place	CONCACAF U-20 Championship	2009
- * Club domestic league appearances and goals as of 18 May 2025 ‡ National team caps and goals as of 20 November 2023

Bryan Josué Oviedo Jiménez (born 18 February 1990) is a Costa Rican former professional footballer who played as a left-back or left midfielder for the Costa Rica national team.

He was selected for the Costa Rica national team at the Copa América Centenario and the 2018 and 2022 FIFA World Cup. Oviedo has previously represented Saprissa, Nordsjælland, Everton and Sunderland.

== Club career ==
=== Copenhagen ===
In early 2010 he signed for Danish club Copenhagen. He did however only see limited playing time, and in January 2011 he was loaned out to FC Nordsjælland for the rest of the season. When he returned he became the starting left back for FCK in the 2011–12 season.

=== Everton ===
On 31 August 2012, Oviedo signed for English side Everton for an undisclosed fee. He made his debut as an 85th-minute substitute during a 3–0 away league win over Swansea City in September. Oviedo was very much a squad player during his first season with Everton as he made 15 league appearances, 14 of those as a substitute. In 2012, in a starting 11 against Norwich City, Oviedo picked up his first assist for the club. He scored his first goal for Everton on 30 November 2013 in a 4–0 win over Stoke City, also picking up an assist. Four days later he scored against Manchester United in the 86th minute in a 1–0 win, leading Everton to their first win at Old Trafford in 21 years.

On 25 January 2014, Oviedo suffered a broken left leg 18 minutes into the Stevenage vs Everton FA Cup Fourth Round tie. He sustained the injury from a tackle on Stevenage midfielder Simon Heslop, a clean break to both his tibia and fibula.

Immediately after the game, speaking to BT Sport, Everton manager Roberto Martínez said "A real negative today is the unfortunate incident and we need to give Bryan as much support as we can now. He's had a terrific season and I've been very impressed with him. He's an important player in the group and he deserves a speedy recovery. The injury to Bryan affected everyone. Those type of injuries leave a sick taste." Everton later confirmed that Oviedo would require surgery to heal a double fracture of his left leg. In May 2014, Oviedo said he was unable to recover from his injury in time to be ready for the 2014 World Cup with his national team.

Oviedo returned from injury on 23 September in Everton's 3–0 defeat at Swansea City in the second round of the League Cup; he started the match before being replaced after 58 minutes by James McCarthy.

=== Sunderland ===
On 30 January 2017, Oviedo and former Everton teammate Darron Gibson joined Sunderland on permanent deals; with Oviedo penning a three-and-a-half-year deal, taking him up to the summer of 2020; while Gibson signed a one-a-half-year deal to reunite with former manager David Moyes. On 4 February 2017, Oviedo made his Sunderland debut in a 4–0 win against Crystal Palace at Selhurst Park.

=== Return to Copenhagen ===
In July 2019 he re-signed for FC Copenhagen. After three seasons at Copenhagen, with only 33 appearances, Oviedo's contract with the Danish club came to an end in June 2022 and was not extended.

=== Real Salt Lake ===
On 5 August 2022, Oviedo signed with Major League Soccer club Real Salt Lake. On 15 August 2024, Oviedo was waived by Salt Lake.

== International career ==
In 2007, Oviedo represented Costa Rica at the CONCACAF U17 Tournament (a precursor to the CONCACAF U17 Championship). Oviedo played in all three games, beating Trinidad and Tobago 2–0, drawing 0–0 with Canada and losing 2–1 to United States. Costa Rica finished in second place in Group B and qualifying for the 2007 FIFA U-17 World Cup. Oviedo was not selected in the U17 World Cup squad.

Two years later Oviedo was named in the 2009 CONCACAF U-20 Championship squad. Oviedo's Costa Rica beat Mexico 1–0 in their opening game, drew 0–0 with Trinidad and Tobago and beat Canada 2–1 in the final group stage game. Oviedo was not named in the team for the semi-final against Honduras but played in the final where Costa Rica beat USA 3–0. Due to the successful campaign in the U-20 Championship, Costa Rica qualified for the 2009 FIFA U-20 World Cup. Oviedo retained his place in the national under 20 team and was named in the squad for the U-20 World Cup.

The U20 World Cup did not get off to the best of starts. Oviedo featured in the team in a 5–0 loss to Brazil in Costa Rica's opening game in Group E. In the second game he helped Costa Rica defeat Australia 3–0 and was also named in the team that lost their final group game against Czech Republic 3–2. The three points were enough to qualify and Costa Rica defeated hosts Egypt 2–0 in front of 81,860 in the knock out stage. Costa Rica beat United Arab Emirates 2–1 after extra time in the quarter finals and lost to Brazil 1–0 at the semi-final stage. The Costa Ricans met Hungary in the third place playoff where they were defeated on penalties after a 1–1 draw.

His debut match with the Costa Rica national team was against Argentina on 26 January 2010.

Oviedo was named in the Costa Rica national team for the 2011 CONCACAF Gold Cup. Costa Rica finished second in Group A after opening with a 5–0 win against Cuba, a 1–1 draw with El Salvador ensuring qualification before losing 4–1 to Mexico in the final group stage game. Costa Rica were knocked out of the competition following a penalty shootout after a 1–1 draw with Honduras.

In May 2018 he was named in Costa Rica's 23-man squad for the 2018 FIFA World Cup in Russia.

== Career statistics ==
=== Club ===
As of 17 February 2021

Appearances and goals by club, season and competition
Club	Season	League			National cup		League cup		Other		Total	
Club	Season	Division	Apps	Goals	Apps	Goals	Apps	Goals	Apps	Goals	Apps	Goals
Saprissa	2009–10	Costa Rican Primera División	7	0	0	0	—		1 (Note: Appearance in Costa Rican Primera División play-offs)	0	8	0
Copenhagen	2009–10	Danish Superliga	3	0	0	0	—		0	0	3	0
Copenhagen	2010–11	Danish Superliga	1	0	2	0	—		0	0	3	0
Copenhagen	2011–12	Danish Superliga	20	1	6	0	—		4 (Note: Appearances in UEFA Europa League)	0	30	1
Copenhagen	2012–13	Danish Superliga	6	1	0	0	—		4 (Note: Appearances in UEFA Champions League)	0	10	1
Copenhagen	Total		30	2	8	0	—		8	0	46	2
Nordsjælland (loan)	2010–11	Danish Superliga	14	0	1	0	—		0	0	15	0
Everton	2012–13	Premier League	15	0	2	0	1	0	—		18	0
Everton	2013–14	Premier League	9	2	2	0	2	0	—		13	2
Everton	2014–15	Premier League	6	0	2	0	1	0	2	0	11	0
Everton	2015–16	Premier League	14	0	3	0	2	0	—		19	0
Everton	2016–17	Premier League	6	0	—		1	0	—		7	0
Everton	Total		50	2	9	0	7	0	2	0	68	2
Sunderland	2016–17	Premier League	10	0	—		—		—		10	0
Sunderland	2017–18	Championship	34	2	1	0	1	0	—		36	2
Sunderland	2018–19	League One	23	0	2	0	0	0	6 (Note: Three appearances in EFL Trophy, three appearances in League One play-offs)	0	31	0
Sunderland	Total		67	2	3	0	1	0	6	0	77	2
Copenhagen	2019–20	Danish Superliga	15	0	0	0	—		6 (Note: One appearance in UEFA Champions League, five appearances in UEFA Europa League)	0	21	0
Copenhagen	2020–21	Danish Superliga	7	0	0	0	—		0	0	7	0
Copenhagen	Total		22	0	0	0	0	0	6	0	28	0
Career total			190	6	21	0	8	0	23	0	242	6

=== International ===
As of match played 20 November 2023

Appearances and goals by national team and year
National team	Year	Apps	Goals
Costa Rica	2010	3	0
Costa Rica	2011	9	1
Costa Rica	2012	9	0
Costa Rica	2013	5	0
Costa Rica	2014	0	0
Costa Rica	2015	2	0
Costa Rica	2016	3	0
Costa Rica	2017	8	0
Costa Rica	2018	11	0
Costa Rica	2019	5	1
Costa Rica	2020	0	0
Costa Rica	2021	12	0
Costa Rica	2022	12	0
Costa Rica	2023	2	0
Total		81	2

Scores and results list Costa Rica's goal tally first, score column indicates score after each Oviedo goal.

List of international goals scored by Bryan Oviedo
No.	Date	Venue	Opponent	Score	Result	Competition
1	9 February 2011	Estadio José Antonio Anzoátegui, Barcelona, Venezuela	Venezuela	1–0	2–2	Friendly
2	16 June 2019	Estadio Nacional, San José, Costa Rica	Nicaragua	1–0	4–0	2019 CONCACAF Gold Cup

== Honours ==
Copenhagen

- Danish Superliga: 2009–10, 2021–22
- Danish Cup: 2011–12

FC Nordsjælland

- Danish Cup: 2010–11

Costa Rica

- UNCAF Nations Cup runner-up: 2011

Individual

- Danish Cup Player of the Year: 2011–12
