= Carl Ikeme =

English footballer (born 1986)

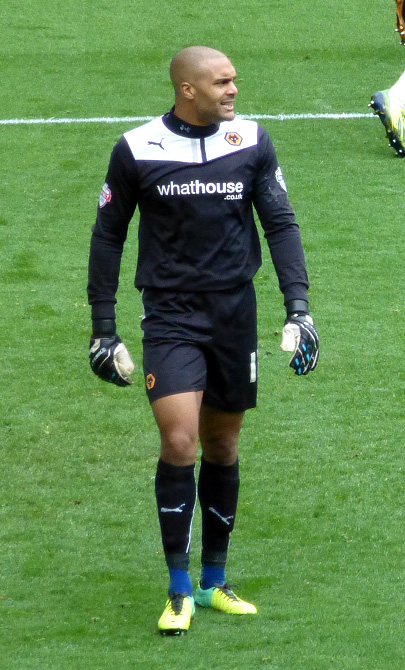
- Ikeme playing for Wolverhampton Wanderers in 2014

Personal information
- Full name: Carl Onora Ikeme
- Date of birth: 8 June 1986 (age 40)
- Place of birth: Sutton Coldfield, England
- Height: 1.88 m (6 ft 2 in)
- Position: Goalkeeper

Youth career
- –2003: Wolverhampton Wanderers

Senior career*
| Years | Team | Apps | (Gls) |
| 2003–2018 | Wolverhampton Wanderers | 191 | (0) |
| 2004 | → Accrington Stanley (loan) | 3 | (0) |
| 2005–2006 | → Stockport County (loan) | 9 | (0) |
| 2009 | → Charlton Athletic (loan) | 4 | (0) |
| 2009 | → Sheffield United (loan) | 2 | (0) |
| 2010 | → Queens Park Rangers (loan) | 17 | (0) |
| 2010 | → Leicester City (loan) | 5 | (0) |
| 2011 | → Middlesbrough (loan) | 10 | (0) |
| 2011 | → Doncaster Rovers (loan) | 5 | (0) |
| 2012 | → Doncaster Rovers (loan) | 10 | (0) |
| Total | | 256 | (0) |

International career
| 2015–2016 | Nigeria | 10 | (0) |
- * Club domestic league appearances and goals

Carl Onora Ikeme (born 8 June 1986) is a former professional footballer who played as a goalkeeper.

He spent his entire career at Wolverhampton Wanderers, making 207 appearances across all competitions. He was part of their teams that won the Championship in 2009 and League One in 2014, and made one Premier League appearance in 2012. Throughout his time at Wolves, he was loaned to eight other clubs. Ikeme was born and raised in England, but chose to represent Nigeria at international level, earning ten caps between 2015 and 2016.

In July 2017, Ikeme was diagnosed with acute leukaemia. A year later, after being in complete remission, he retired.

== Club career ==
=== Early career ===
Ikeme progressed through Wolverhampton Wanderers' academy and made the first team squad in their 2003–04 Premier League season. Due to Matt Murray's long-term injury, he was promoted to the substitutes' bench for a string of games but never played.

He moved on a month-long loan to Conference Premier side Accrington Stanley on 14 October 2004, to fill the gap in their team caused by Jon Kennedy's broken leg. He made his senior debut on 16 October when he played the first of four games for them, keeping a clean sheet in a goalless draw at Aldershot Town.

He finally made his Wolves debut the following season, in a 5–1 win over Chester City in the League Cup second round on 23 August 2005. He also had a further loan move to Stockport County in late 2005 which was cut short due to a hand injury. On 26 August 2006, he made his league debut for Wolves when he appeared as a late substitute in a 1–0 home win over Luton Town, replacing Murray for the final three minutes.

Ikeme suffered a knee injury during the 2006–07 season and had to undergo surgery, which kept him out of contention until late 2007. After recovering, he was an unused substitute or only employed in reserve team fixtures. It was not until September 2008 that he got his chance to return to Wolves' first team after regular keeper Wayne Hennessey was suspended. He enjoyed his longest run of games in a Wolves shirt until injury ruled him out for the remainder of the season, during which the club went on to claim the Championship title and reach the Premier League.

=== Championship loan spells ===
After regaining fitness, he joined League One side Charlton Athletic on a month's loan in October 2009 to cover for injured Rob Elliot, making five appearances. Upon the end of this loan he immediately went out on loan again, this time to Championship side Sheffield United for a month but a hamstring injury halted his stay. He recovered from this setback and was again sent out on loan to a Championship club, this time Queens Park Rangers during January 2010, where he made 17 appearances.

In August 2010, he again went out on loan when he joined Leicester City on a one-month emergency deal as cover for injured keeper Chris Weale. This spell was later extended but ended when the Foxes recruited Chris Kirkland at the end of November, after four appearances by Ikeme. He spent the remainder of the 2010–11 season back at Wolves.

Ikeme completed a one-month loan move to Championship side Middlesbrough in August 2011, after impressing in a pre-season trial. This loan deal was extended for a further month in August, and then for a third and final month until 1 November. He kept six clean sheets in ten games before a hand injury saw him return to Molineux.

Once recovered, he had a loan spell at another Championship side when he joined Doncaster Rovers in November 2011. He made five appearances for the club as they struggled at the foot of the table before the deal expired in January. He returned to them once again in March 2012, joining on an initial one-month loan deal, later extended to run until the end of the season. However, he was recalled by Wolves following an injury to first choice goalkeeper Wayne Hennessey; by this point, Doncaster had been confirmed as relegated to League One under his future Wolves manager Dean Saunders.

=== Return to Wolves ===
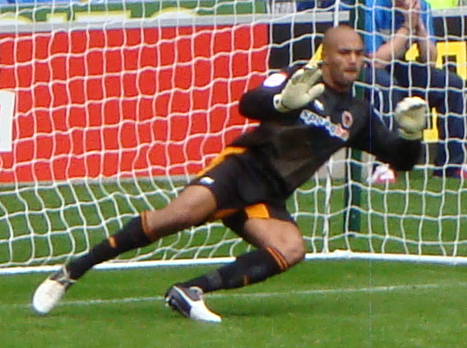
Ikeme playing for Wolverhampton Wanderers in 2012

Ikeme made his first appearance for Wolves since January 2009 on the final day of 2011–12, coming on as a substitute for Dorus de Vries in the 51st minute of a 3–2 loss to Wigan Athletic at the DW Stadium on 13 May 2012.

Ikeme started the 2012–13 season as Wolves' first choice goalkeeper in the Championship following injuries to Hennessey and De Vries; he maintained his place in the first team when the latter returned in September 2012. In March 2013 he conceded a bizarre own goal during a league game against Bristol City, when he allowed a David Davis backpass to go between his legs and roll over the line. Ikeme was substituted at half time, and it was later confirmed that he had broken his hand during the interval by punching a tactics board in the dressing room in frustration at the incident. This injury kept him out for the remainder of the season, which ended in relegation to League One.

Ikeme retained the goalkeeping position at Wolves for the 2013–14 season, excelling in a 3–0 win over Colchester United at the Colchester Community Stadium on 5 October 2013 when he saved a late penalty from Freddie Sears. However, he again suffered a broken hand when he was injured in a collision against Tranmere on 1 January 2014. He returned to Wolves' goal now as the established first choice, following the sale of Hennessey, and was a part of the team that won the League One title with a record points tally. After keeping 22 clean sheets across the season Ikeme was named in the PFA League One Team of the Year alongside four other teammates.

Once back in the Championship, Ikeme impressed at the start of 2014–15, keeping five clean sheets in the first eight games, during which he saved an Owen Garvan penalty in a 1–0 win over Bolton Wanderers on 20 September 2014 at Molineux.

During the 2016–17 season, Ikeme extended his current deal, ensuring he is contracted to Wolves until summer 2020. The goalkeeper received his first career red card on 21 January 2017 in a league match at Norwich City for pushing Wes Hoolahan; when Wolves appealed, the suspension was reduced from three matches to two.

=== Illness and retirement ===
On 6 July 2017, Wolverhampton Wanderers announced that Ikeme had been diagnosed with acute leukaemia after returning abnormal blood tests during a routine pre-season check-up. Wolves won the Championship title and returned to the Premier League, but Ikeme took no part due to his treatment.

Ikeme told the public on 23 June 2018 that he was in "complete remission" after "a tough year and intense chemotherapy". He announced his retirement on medical grounds on 27 July. The team's new goalkeeper Rui Patrício left the number 1 jersey vacant in Ikeme's honour, choosing the 11 instead.

== International career ==
Ikeme was born in Sutton Coldfield, West Midlands, and was eligible to represent England or Nigeria at international level, choosing the latter. He was first called up to the "Super Eagles" squad in March 2007 by new manager Berti Vogts, who named a 37-man provisional squad for a 2008 Africa Cup of Nations qualification match against Uganda that introduced other foreign-born players such as Gabriel Agbonlahor, Victor Anichebe and Toto Tamuz.

He made his international debut for Nigeria on 5 September 2015 against Tanzania in a 2017 Africa Cup of Nations qualification game. Ikeme made three appearances early on in Nigeria's successful qualification campaign for the 2018 FIFA World Cup, but could not go to the final tournament due to his cancer treatment, which manager Gernot Rohr called his greatest regret.

== Personal life ==
Ikeme is a practitioner of Brazilian jiu-jitsu and has reached the rank of blue belt, along with winning the British Open and earning a bronze medal at the IBJJF European Championship.

== Career statistics ==
=== Club ===
Appearances and goals by club, season and competition
| Club | Season | League | | | FA Cup | | League Cup | | Other | | Total | |
| Club | Season | Division | Apps | Goals | Apps | Goals | Apps | Goals | Apps | Goals | Apps | Goals |
|---|---|---|---|---|---|---|---|---|---|---|---|---|
| Wolverhampton Wanderers | 2004–05 | Championship | 0 | 0 | 0 | 0 | 0 | 0 | — | | 0 | 0 |
| Wolverhampton Wanderers | 2005–06 | Championship | 0 | 0 | 0 | 0 | 1 | 0 | — | | 1 | 0 |
| Wolverhampton Wanderers | 2006–07 | Championship | 2 | 0 | 0 | 0 | 0 | 0 | 0 | 0 | 2 | 0 |
| Wolverhampton Wanderers | 2007–08 | Championship | 0 | 0 | 0 | 0 | 0 | 0 | — | | 0 | 0 |
| Wolverhampton Wanderers | 2008–09 | Championship | 12 | 0 | 0 | 0 | 1 | 0 | — | | 13 | 0 |
| Wolverhampton Wanderers | 2009–10 | Premier League | 0 | 0 | 0 | 0 | 0 | 0 | — | | 0 | 0 |
| Wolverhampton Wanderers | 2010–11 | Premier League | 0 | 0 | 0 | 0 | 0 | 0 | — | | 0 | 0 |
| Wolverhampton Wanderers | 2011–12 | Premier League | 1 | 0 | 0 | 0 | 0 | 0 | — | | 1 | 0 |
| Wolverhampton Wanderers | 2012–13 | Championship | 38 | 0 | 1 | 0 | 2 | 0 | — | | 41 | 0 |
| Wolverhampton Wanderers | 2013–14 | League One | 41 | 0 | 2 | 0 | 1 | 0 | 1 | 0 | 45 | 0 |
| Wolverhampton Wanderers | 2014–15 | Championship | 33 | 0 | 2 | 0 | 0 | 0 | — | | 35 | 0 |
| Wolverhampton Wanderers | 2015–16 | Championship | 34 | 0 | 1 | 0 | 1 | 0 | — | | 36 | 0 |
| Wolverhampton Wanderers | 2016–17 | Championship | 31 | 0 | 2 | 0 | 0 | 0 | — | | 33 | 0 |
| Wolverhampton Wanderers | 2017–18 | Championship | 0 | 0 | 0 | 0 | 0 | 0 | — | | 0 | 0 |
| Wolverhampton Wanderers | Total | | 191 | 0 | 8 | 0 | 7 | 0 | 1 | 0 | 207 | 0 |
| Accrington Stanley (loan) | 2004–05 | Conference Premier | 3 | 0 | 0 | 0 | 0 | 0 | 1 | 0 | 4 | 0 |
| Stockport County (loan) | 2005–06 | League Two | 9 | 0 | 0 | 0 | 0 | 0 | — | | 9 | 0 |
| Charlton Athletic (loan) | 2009–10 | League One | 4 | 0 | 0 | 0 | 0 | 0 | 1 | 0 | 5 | 0 |
| Sheffield United (loan) | 2009–10 | Championship | 2 | 0 | 0 | 0 | 0 | 0 | — | | 2 | 0 |
| Queen's Park Rangers (loan) | 2009–10 | Championship | 17 | 0 | 0 | 0 | 0 | 0 | — | | 17 | 0 |
| Leicester City (loan) | 2010–11 | Championship | 5 | 0 | 0 | 0 | 0 | 0 | — | | 5 | 0 |
| Middlesbrough (loan) | 2011–12 | Championship | 10 | 0 | 0 | 0 | 0 | 0 | — | | 10 | 0 |
| Doncaster Rovers (loan) | 2011–12 | Championship | 15 | 0 | 0 | 0 | 0 | 0 | — | | 15 | 0 |
| Career total | | | 253 | 0 | 8 | 0 | 7 | 0 | 3 | 0 | 271 | 0 |

=== International ===
Appearances and goals by national team and year
| National team | Year | Apps | Goals |
|---|---|---|---|
| Nigeria | 2015 | 6 | 0 |
| Nigeria | 2016 | 4 | 0 |
| Total | | 10 | 0 |

== Honours ==
Wolverhampton Wanderers

- Football League Championship: 2008–09
- Football League One: 2013–14

Individual

- Football League One Team of the Season: 2013–14
- PFA Team of the Year: 2013–14 League One
