= Jack Kennedy (disambiguation) =

John F. Kennedy (1917–1963) was the 35th president of the United States from 1961 to 1963.

Jack Kennedy may also refer to:

- Jack Kennedy (footballer, born 1873), Scottish international football player
- Jack Kennedy (footballer, born 1906), English football player
- Jack Kennedy (hurler), Irish forward
- Jack Kennedy (jockey) (born 1999), Irish jockey
- Jack Kennedy (tennis) (born 2008), American tennis player
- Jack Kennedy (train robber) (c. 1870–1922), American outlaw
- Jack Kennedy (Gaelic footballer)
- Jack Kennedy (coach), Canadian football and ice hockey coach
- Jack Kennedy (rugby union)
- Uncle Jack Kennedy (1919–2005), activist and spokesman for Australian Aboriginal rights
- Kennedy (musician), American nu-disco musician and former member of the Silversun Pickups

== See also ==
- John Kennedy (disambiguation)
- Jack Kennedy Schlossberg (born 1993), grandson of the above
