= Argyle, Utah =

Argyle
- Ghost town
- Location within Utah Location within the United States
- Coordinates: 41°37′37″N 111°12′19″W
- Country: United States
- State: Utah
- County: Rich
- Established: c. 1875
- Abandoned: 1915
- Founder: John Kennedy, Sr.
- Named for: Argyll

Argyle is a ghost town located in Rich County, Utah, United States. Lying some 3 miles (4.8 km) southwest of Randolph on Big Creek, it was inhabited from approximately 1875–1915.

== History ==
Circa 1875, John Kennedy, Sr. (the great-grandfather of David M. Kennedy) settled the area with his three sons (one of whom, John Kennedy, Jr. later served in the Utah State legislature), who built homes and ranches along the various branches of Big Creek. Within a few years several other Mormon families moved in and established a local church group. The town became known as Kennedyville. In 1885 the community organized a school system, and the mostly Scottish American residents voted to rename the town Argyle in honor of Argyll, Scotland. School was originally held in Kennedy's home until a one-room brick schoolhouse was built in 1895. The cold climate made farming difficult, and the population grew slowly. There were 111 inhabitants in 1900, and just over 125 in 1910 when a second room was built onto the schoolhouse.

Argyle declined as transportation improved and farmers no longer had to live as close to their fields. The school was considered inferior to the education available in nearby Randolph, and Argyle had no stores or other services of its own. In 1913 the local church organization was discontinued, and in 1915 the school itself closed and merged with the one in Randolph. Most of the residents moved to Randolph and kept their farms in the Argyle area.

Although the town is deserted, numerous buildings and walls still stand at Argyle. It is surrounded by hay fields and closed to the public, but the ruins can easily be seen from the road.
