= 2017–18 Sunderland A.F.C. season =

English football club season

Sunderland
2017–18 season
- Chairman: Ellis Short (until 29 April); Stewart Donald (from 29 April)
- Manager: Simon Grayson (until 31 October); Robbie Stockdale, Billy McKinlay (from 31 October to 19 November); Chris Coleman (from 19 November to 29 April); Robbie Stockdale (from 29 April)
- Stadium: Stadium of Light
- Championship: 24th (relegated)
- FA Cup: Third round (eliminated by Middlesbrough)
- EFL Cup: Third round (eliminated by Everton)
- Top goalscorer: League: Lewis Grabban (12); All: Lewis Grabban (12)
Home colours	Away colours	Third colours

The 2017–18 season was Sunderland's 139th season in existence, and their first season in the Championship since 2006, after relegation from the Premier League in the previous season. Along with competing in the Championship, the club also participated in the FA Cup and EFL Cup. The season covered the period from 1 July 2017 to 30 June 2018.

Simon Grayson began the season as Sunderland manager, following the departure of David Moyes in May 2017. However, he did not complete the full season, instead being sacked towards the end of October after only one win in his first fifteen league matches saw Sunderland rooted to the bottom of the table. He was replaced by former Wales manager Chris Coleman.

Sunderland suffered a second successive relegation on 21 April 2018, following a 1–2 home defeat to fellow struggling side Burton Albion, after they had led the match 1–0. Results elsewhere meant that the club competed in League One in the following season.

The events of the season formed the backdrop to the first series of the documentary programme Sunderland 'Til I Die, which was released on Netflix on 14 December 2018.

== First team squad ==
Ages are as of 4 August 2017.

Squad No.	Name	Nationality	Position(s)	Age at Season Start	Contract Ends	Signed from
Goalkeepers
1	Jason Steele	(England)	GK	26	2021	(England) Blackburn Rovers
12	Lee Camp	(Northern Ireland)	GK	32	2018	(England) Cardiff City (loan)
25	Robbin Ruiter	(Netherlands)	GK	30	2019	(Netherlands) Utrecht
32	Max Stryjek	(Poland)	GK	21	2019	(Poland) Polonia Warsaw
Defenders
2	Billy Jones	(England)	RB	30	2018	(England) West Bromwich Albion
3	Bryan Oviedo	(Costa Rica)	LB	27	2020	(England) Everton
4	Paddy McNair	(Northern Ireland)	CB/DM/CM	22	2020	(England) Manchester United
15	Brendan Galloway	(England)	LB	21	2018	(England) Everton (loan)
16	John O'Shea	(Republic of Ireland)	CB	36	2018	(England) Manchester United
18	Tyias Browning	(England)	RB	23	2018	(England) Everton (loan)
21	Adam Matthews	(Wales)	RB	25	2019	(Scotland) Celtic
22	Donald Love	(Scotland)	RB	22	2020	(England) Manchester United
23	Lamine Koné	(Ivory Coast)	CB	28	2020	(France) Lorient
35	Jake Clarke-Salter	(England)	CB	19	2018	(England) Chelsea (loan)
36	Marc Wilson	(Republic of Ireland)	CB/LB	29	2018	(England) Bournemouth
Midfielders
6	Lee Cattermole (C)	(England)	DM	29	2021	(England) Wigan Athletic
7	Jonny Williams	(Wales)	CM	23	2018	(England) Crystal Palace (loan)
8	Jack Rodwell	(England)	CM	26	2019	(England) Manchester City
11	Kazenga LuaLua	(Democratic Republic of the Congo)	LW	26	2018	(England) Brighton & Hove Albion
13	Callum McManaman	(England)	RW	26	2019	(England) West Bromwich Albion
14	Duncan Watmore	(England)	RW/LW	23	2020	(England) Altrincham
19	Aiden McGeady	(Republic of Ireland)	LW/RW	31	2020	(England) Everton
24	Darron Gibson	(Republic of Ireland)	CM/DM	29	2018	(England) Everton
26	George Honeyman	(England)	AM	22	2019	Academy
27	Lynden Gooch	(United States)	AM	21	2019	Academy
28	Ethan Robson	(England)	CM	21	2018	Academy
40	Elliot Embleton	(England)	CM	18	2019	Academy
53	Ovie Ejaria	(England)	CM	19	2018	(England) Liverpool (loan)
Forwards
9	Ashley Fletcher	(England)	ST	21	2018	(England) Middlesbrough (loan)
20	Josh Maja	(England)	ST	18	2019	(England) Manchester City
29	Joel Asoro	(Sweden)	ST	18	2019	(Sweden) IF Brommapojkarna

=== New contracts ===
No.	Pos	Player	Until	Source
26	Midfielder	(England) George Honeyman	June 2019	
16	Defender	(Republic of Ireland) John O'Shea	June 2018	

== Transfers and loans ==
=== Transfers in ===
Date from	Position	Nationality	Name	From	Fee	Ref.
13 July 2017	LW	(Republic of Ireland)	Aiden McGeady	(England) Everton	£250,000	
13 July 2017	ST	(England)	James Vaughan	(England) Bury	£500,000	
26 July 2017	GK	(England)	Jason Steele	(England) Blackburn Rovers	£500,000	
2 August 2017	GK	(Netherlands)	Robbin Ruiter	(Netherlands) Utrecht	Free	
31 August 2017	CB	(Republic of Ireland)	Marc Wilson	(England) Bournemouth	Free	
31 August 2017	LW	(England)	Callum McManaman	(England) West Bromwich Albion	Free	
25 January 2018	LW	(Democratic Republic of the Congo)	Kazenga LuaLua	(England) Brighton & Hove Albion	Free	

=== Loans in ===
Date from	Position	Nationality	Name	From	Until	Ref.
5 July 2017	LB	(England)	Brendan Galloway	(England) Everton	30 June 2018	
8 July 2017	RB	(England)	Tyias Browning	(England) Everton	30 June 2018	
26 July 2017	ST	(England)	Lewis Grabban	(England) Bournemouth	5 January 2018	
31 August 2017	AM	(Wales)	Jonny Williams	(England) Crystal Palace	30 June 2018	
8 January 2018	CB	(England)	Jake Clarke-Salter	(England) Chelsea	30 June 2018	
31 January 2018	CM	(England)	Ovie Ejaria	(England) Liverpool	30 June 2018	
31 January 2018	ST	(England)	Ashley Fletcher	(England) Middlesbrough	30 June 2018	
31 January 2018	GK	(Northern Ireland)	Lee Camp	(England) Cardiff City	30 June 2018	

=== Transfers out ===
Date from	Position	Nationality	Name	To	Fee	Ref.
1 July 2017	CB	(England)	Joleon Lescott	Free agent	Released	
1 July 2017	DM	(Germany)	Jan Kirchhoff	Free agent	Released	
1 July 2017	CM	(Sweden)	Sebastian Larsson	(England) Hull City	Free	
1 July 2017	RW	(England)	Will Buckley	(England) Bolton Wanderers	Free	
1 July 2017	LW	(South Africa)	Steven Pienaar	(South Africa) Bidvest Wits	Free	
1 July 2017	ST	(Nigeria)	Victor Anichebe	(China) Beijing Enterprises	Free	
1 July 2017	GK	(England)	Jordan Pickford	(England) Everton	£30,000,000	
1 July 2017	ST	(England)	Jermain Defoe	(England) Bournemouth	Free	
19 July 2017	GK	(Italy)	Vito Mannone	(England) Reading	£2,000,000	
12 January 2018	GK	(Portugal)	Mika	Free agent	Released	
12 January 2018	FW	(England)	James Vaughan	(England) Wigan Athletic	£300,000	

=== Loans out ===
Start date	Position	Nationality	Name	To	Until	Ref.
1 July 2017	LW	(Italy)	Fabio Borini	(Italy) Milan	30 June 2018	
7 August 2017	RW	(Netherlands)	Jeremain Lens	(Turkey) Beşiktaş	30 June 2018	
30 August 2017	CB	(England)	Michael Ledger	(England) Hartlepool United	30 June 2018	
31 August 2017	GK	(Poland)	Max Stryjek	(England) Accrington Stanley	18 January 2018	
31 August 2017	CB	(Senegal)	Papy Djilobodji	(France) Dijon	30 June 2018	
31 August 2017	AM	(Tunisia)	Wahbi Khazri	(France) Rennes	30 June 2018	
20 October 2017	ST	(England)	Andrew Nelson	(England) Harrogate Town	17 November 2017	
2 January 2018	ST	(England)	Andrew Nelson	(Scotland) Falkirk	End of season	
7 December 2017	GK	(Republic of Ireland)	James Talbot	(England) Darlington	30 June 2018	
20 January 2018	DF	(Australia)	Tom Beadling	(Scotland) Dunfermline Athletic	30 June 2018	
31 January 2018	MF	(Gabon)	Didier Ndong	(England) Watford	30 June 2018	

== Pre-season friendlies ==
Sunderland announced eight pre-season friendlies against Bury, Hibernian, Livingston, Bradford City, Scunthorpe United, St Johnstone, Celtic and Hartlepool United.

7 July 2017	Bury	2–3	Sunderland	Bury
19:30 BST	Tutte 19'; Reilly 27'	Report	Rodwell 37'; Maja 77', 86'	Stadium: Gigg Lane; Attendance: 2,110; Referee: Darren Handley

9 July 2017	Hibernian (Scotland)	2–2	Sunderland	Leith, Scotland
14:00 BST	Boyle 68'; S. Murray 72'	Report	Khazri 42'; Lens 54'	Stadium: Easter Road; Attendance: 9,309; Referee: Gavin Duncan

12 July 2017	Livingston (Scotland)	0–3	Sunderland	Livingston, Scotland
19:45 BST		Report	Khazri 25'; Asoro 76'; Lens 90'	Stadium: Almondvale Stadium; Attendance: 1,119; Referee: Steven Kirkland

15 July 2017	St Johnstone (Scotland)	3–0	Sunderland	Perth, Scotland
15:00 BST	MacLean 19'; Wotherspoon 21', 24'	Report		Stadium: McDiarmid Park; Attendance: 2,032; Referee: Nick Walsh

18 July 2017	Hartlepool United	1–2	Sunderland	Hartlepool
19:30 BST	Donaldson 62'	Report	Maja 37'; Lens 90'	Stadium: Victoria Park; Attendance: 4,728; Referee: Geoff Eltringham

22 July 2017	Bradford City	2–3	Sunderland	Bradford
15:00 BST	McMahon 65' (pen.); Gibson 90'	Report	Maja 5'; Lens 8'; Jones 42'	Stadium: Valley Parade; Attendance: 3,902; Referee: Geoff Eltringham

26 July 2017	Scunthorpe United	0–0	Sunderland	Scunthorpe
19:30 BST		Report		Stadium: Glanford Park; Attendance: 2,794; Referee: Darren Drysdale

29 July 2017	Sunderland	0–5	(Scotland) Celtic	Sunderland
15:00 BST	Vaughan (penalty missed) 35'	Report	McGregor 5', 15', 57' (pen.); Hayes 39'; Armstrong 70'	Stadium: Stadium of Light; Attendance: Not announced Referee: Tony Harrington

== Competitions ==
=== Championship ===
==== League table ====
Pos	Team	Pld	W	D	L	GF	GA	GD	Pts	Promotion, qualification or relegation
20	Reading	46	10	14	22	48	70	−22	44	
21	Bolton Wanderers	46	10	13	23	39	74	−35	43	
22	Barnsley (R)	46	9	14	23	48	72	−24	41	Relegation to EFL League One
23	Burton Albion (R)	46	10	11	25	38	81	−43	41	Relegation to EFL League One
24	Sunderland (R)	46	7	16	23	52	80	−28	37	Relegation to EFL League One

Source: English Football League
Rules for classification: 1) Points; 2) Goal difference; 3) Number of goals scored
(R) Relegated

==== Result summary ====
Overall								Home						Away					
Pld	W	D	L	GF	GA	GD	Pts	W	D	L	GF	GA	GD	W	D	L	GF	GA	GD
46	7	16	23	52	80	−28	37	3	7	13	23	39	−16	4	9	10	29	41	−12

Last updated: 13 January 2019.

==== Results by matchday ====
Round	1	2	3	4	5	6	7	8	9	10	11	12	13	14	15	16	17	18	19	20	21	22	23	24	25	26	27	28	29	30	31	32	33	34	35	36	37	38	39	40	41	42	43	44	45	46
Ground	H	A	A	H	A	H	H	A	H	A	A	H	A	H	H	A	H	A	A	H	A	H	H	A	A	H	A	H	A	H	A	H	A	H	A	H	A	H	A	H	A	H	A	H	A	H
Result	D	W	D	L	L	L	L	D	L	L	D	D	D	L	D	L	D	L	W	L	D	W	D	L	W	L	L	W	L	L	D	L	L	D	D	L	L	L	W	L	D	D	D	L	L	W
Position	15	6	6	12	19	20	20	21	22	23	23	23	23	23	22	24	24	24	22	23	23	21	22	22	21	24	24	22	23	23	23	23	24	24	24	24	24	24	23	23	23	23	24	24	24	24
Points	1	4	5	5	5	5	5	6	6	6	7	8	9	9	10	10	11	11	14	14	15	18	19	19	22	22	22	25	25	25	26	26	26	27	28	28	28	28	31	31	32	33	34	34	34	37

Source: 11v11.com
A = Away; H = Home; W = Win; D = Draw; L = Loss

==== Matches ====
The fixtures for the 2017–18 season were released on 21 June 2017.

4 August 2017 1	Sunderland	1–1	Derby County	Sunderland
19:45 BST	Grabban 42' (pen.); Vaughan (yellow card) 89'	Report	Johnson 11'	Stadium: Stadium of Light; Attendance: 29,578; Referee: Oliver Langford

13 August 2017 2	Norwich City	1–3	Sunderland	Norwich
13:30 BST	Grabban 79' (o.g.)	Report	Grabban 27', 72'; Vaughan (yellow card) 53'; McGeady 60'	Stadium: Carrow Road; Attendance: 26,343; Referee: Andrew Madley

16 August 2017 3	Sheffield Wednesday	1–1	Sunderland	Owlerton
19:45 BST	Jones 70'	Report	Honeyman 4'; Galloway (yellow card) 77'	Stadium: Hillsborough Stadium; Attendance: 27,631; Referee: Steve Martin

19 August 2017 4	Sunderland	0–2	Leeds United	Sunderland
17:30 BST	Galloway (yellow card) 36'; Koné (yellow card) 69'; Ndong (yellow card) 82'	Report	Sáiz 21'; Dallas 76'; Wiedewald (yellow card) 68'	Stadium: Stadium of Light; Attendance: 31,237; Referee: Andy Davies

26 August 2017 5	Barnsley	3–0	Sunderland	Barnsley
15:00 BST	Ugbo 31'; Barnes 35'; Lindsay (yellow card) 40'; Moncur 67'	Report	Oviedo (yellow card) 77'; McGeady (yellow card) 87'; Khazri (yellow card) 90+4'	Stadium: Oakwell; Attendance: 15,697; Referee: Chris Kavanagh

9 September 2017 6	Sunderland	1–2	Sheffield United	Sunderland
16:00 BST	Wilson (yellow card) 48'; Rodwell 90+4'	Report	Donaldson 21', 77'; Coutts (yellow card) 48'; Lundstram (yellow card) 90+4'	Stadium: Stadium of Light; Attendance: 29,579; Referee: Jeremy Simpson

12 September 2017 7	Sunderland	0–1	Nottingham Forest	Sunderland
19:45 BST	Cattermole (yellow card) 48'	Report	Murphy 86'; Cummings (yellow card) 90'	Stadium: Stadium of Light; Attendance: 26,021; Referee: Simon Hooper

15 September 2017 8	Hull City	1–1	Sunderland	Kingston upon Hull
15:00 BST	Grosicki (yellow card) 43'; Meyler 82'; Tomori (yellow card) 90'	Report	Vaughan 17'; Williams (yellow card) 74'; Oviedo (yellow card) 75'; Rodwell (yellow card) 77'; Gooch (yellow card) 90'	Stadium: KCOM Stadium; Attendance: 16,597; Referee: Darren England

23 September 2017 9	Sunderland	1–2	Cardiff City	Sunderland
15:00 BST	Cattermole (yellow card) 11'; Gooch 53' (pen.); Browning (yellow card) 70'; Koné (yellow card) 73'	Report	Richards (yellow card) 19'; Bryson 7'; Gunnarsson (yellow card) 60'; Ralls 73' (pen.), (yellow card) 81'	Stadium: Stadium of Light; Attendance: 25,733; Referee: Peter Bankes

26 September 2017 10	Ipswich Town	5–2	Sunderland	Ipswich
19:45 BST	Waghorn 6'; Spence 27'; Celina 55'; McGoldrick 60'; Nydam (yellow card) 85'; Ward 89'	Report	Jones 10'; Vaughan (yellow card) 44'; McGeady 65', (yellow card) 67'	Stadium: Portman Road; Attendance: 14,907; Referee: Tim Robinson

30 September 2017 11	Preston North End	2–2	Sunderland	Preston
15:00 BST	Fisher (yellow card) 23'; Harrop 55'; Hugill 57'	Report	Honeyman 28'; McGeady 59'; Steele (yellow card) 68'	Stadium: Deepdale; Attendance: 17,621; Referee: Chris Kavanagh

14 October 2017 12	Sunderland	1–1	Queens Park Rangers	Sunderland
15:00 BST	McGeady 61'	Report	Sylla 37'	Stadium: Stadium of Light; Attendance: 26,066; Referee: Stephen Martin

21 October 2017 13	Brentford	3–3	Sunderland	Brentford, London
15:00 BST	Yennaris 8'; Jozefzoon 47'; Dalsgaard (yellow card) 61'; Maupay 78', (yellow card) 90+4'	Report	Grabban 13', 45+2' (pen.); Oviedo (yellow card) 37'; Bentley 40' (o.g.); Cattermole (yellow card) 52'; Ndong (yellow card) 72'; Koné (yellow card) 90+1'	Stadium: Griffin Park; Attendance: 10,726; Referee: Darren England

28 October 2017 14	Sunderland	1–2	Bristol City	Sunderland
15:00 BST	Ndong (yellow card) 27'; Grabban 45+2'; Jones (yellow card) 64'	Report	Reid 28', (yellow card) 83'; Đurić 73'; Pack (yellow card) 86'	Stadium: Stadium of Light; Attendance: 27,317; Referee: Darren Bond

31 October 2017 15	Sunderland	3–3	Bolton Wanderers	Sunderland
19:45 GMT	Grabban 45', 57', (yellow card) 85'; McNair 79'	Report	Ameobi 32'; Madine 60'; Henry 67'	Stadium: Stadium of Light; Attendance: 26,395; Referee: Tony Harrington

5 November 2017 16	Middlesbrough	1–0	Sunderland	Middlesbrough
12:00 GMT	Tavernier 6'; Christie (yellow card) 63'	Report	Jones (yellow card) 17'; Cattermole (yellow card) 45'; McGeady (yellow card) 60'; Wilson (yellow card) 75'	Stadium: Riverside Stadium; Attendance: 29,277; Referee: Jeremy Simpson

18 November 2017 17	Sunderland	2–2	Millwall	Sunderland
15:00 GMT	Grabban 12'; Matthews 46'; Oviedo (yellow card) 62'; Cattermole (yellow card) 65'; Honeyman (yellow card) 69'	Report	Saville 16', 20'	Stadium: Stadium of Light; Attendance: 27,399; Referee: Tim Robinson

22 November 2017 18	Aston Villa	2–1	Sunderland	Birmingham
19:45 GMT	Adomah 10'; Onomah 49'	Report	Grabban 72'	Stadium: Villa Park; Attendance: 27,662; Referee: Stephen Martin

25 November 2017 19	Burton Albion	0–2	Sunderland	Burton
15:00 GMT		Report	Honeyman (yellow card) 49', (goal) 88'; O'Shea (yellow card) 66'; Vaughan 84', (yellow card) 85'	Stadium: Pirelli Stadium; Attendance: 4,808; Referee: Darren England

2 December 2017 20	Sunderland	1–3	Reading	Sunderland
15:00 GMT	McManaman (yellow card) 15' (yellow-red card) 45+3'; Cattermole (yellow card) 35'; Oviedo (yellow card) 43'; Grabban 76' (pen.)	Report	McShane (yellow card) 16'; Edwards 53'; Barrow 68', 71'	Stadium: Stadium of Light; Attendance: 27,386; Referee: Keith Stroud

9 December 2017 21	Wolverhampton Wanderers	0–0	Sunderland	Wolverhampton
15:00 GMT	Douglas (yellow card) 65'	Report	Wilson (yellow card) 51'; Cattermole (yellow card) 61' (yellow-red card) 62'; Honeyman (yellow card) 63'; Browning (yellow card) 80'	Stadium: Molineux Stadium; Attendance: 28,488; Referee: Jeremy Simpson

16 December 2017 22	Sunderland	1–0	Fulham	Sunderland
15:00 GMT	Gooch (yellow card) 62'; Maja 77'	Report	Ojo (yellow card) 60'; Fredericks (yellow card) 90'	Stadium: Stadium of Light; Attendance: 25,904; Referee: Steve Martin

23 December 2017 23	Sunderland	1–1	Birmingham City	Sunderland
15:00 GMT	Grabban 21'	Report	Gallagher 16', (yellow card) 56' (red card) 67'; Kieftenbeld (yellow card) 64'; Dean (yellow card) 80'; Grounds (yellow card) 90+3'	Stadium: Stadium of Light; Attendance: 29,312; Referee: Oliver Langford

26 December 2017 24	Sheffield United	3–0	Sunderland	Sheffield
15:00 GMT	Lundstram 36'; Stearman 58'; Baldock 62'; Basham (yellow card) 77'	Report	Wilson (yellow card) 50'; Oviedo (yellow card) 58'	Stadium: Bramall Lane; Attendance: 30,668; Referee: Peter Bankes

30 December 2017 25	Nottingham Forest	0–1	Sunderland	West Bridgford
15:00 GMT	Traoré (yellow card) 82'	Report	McGeady 40'	Stadium: The City Ground; Attendance: 26,830; Referee: Darren Bond

1 January 2018 26	Sunderland	0–1	Barnsley	Sunderland
15:00 GMT	Love (yellow card) 61'	Report	Potts (yellow card) 11'; Pinnock 47'; Lindsay (yellow card) 50'; Davies (yellow card) 67'; Bradshaw (yellow card) 80'; Fryers (yellow card) 90+1'	Stadium: Stadium of Light; Attendance: 28,311; Referee: Robert Jones

13 January 2018 27	Cardiff City	4–0	Sunderland	Cardiff
12:30 GMT	Paterson 46', 80'; Ralls 55'; Morrison (yellow card) 85'; Pilkington 90+4'	Report	Oviedo (yellow card) 41'; Gooch (yellow card) 45+1'; Ndong (red card) 49'	Stadium: Cardiff City Stadium; Attendance: 17,703; Referee: Andrew Madley
Note: Live on Sky

20 January 2018 28	Sunderland	1–0	Hull City	Sunderland
15:00 GMT	Asoro 20', (yellow card) 78'; Browning (yellow card) 58'; Gooch (yellow card) 90'; Cattermole (yellow card) 90+2'	Report	Dawson (yellow card) 74'; Larsson (yellow card) 81'	Stadium: Stadium of Light; Attendance: 27,437; Referee: Keith Stroud

30 January 2018 29	Birmingham City	3–1	Sunderland	Birmingham
19:45 GMT	Davis 28'; Boga 44'; Gallagher 54'	Report	Oviedo 83'	Stadium: St Andrew's; Attendance: 19,601; Referee: Darren Bond

3 February 2018 30	Sunderland	0–2	Ipswich Town	Sunderland
15:00 GMT	Asoro (yellow card) 19'	Report	Garner 35', (yellow card) 54'; Matthews 45+1' (o.g.)	Stadium: Stadium of Light; Attendance: 27,909; Referee: Darren England

10 February 2018 31	Bristol City	3–3	Sunderland	Bristol
15:00 GMT	Flint 5'; Diedhiou 31', 37', (yellow card) 57'; Smith (yellow card) 45'; Bryan (yellow card) 80'	Report	Brownhill 70' (o.g.); Jones (yellow card) 72'; McGeady 81'; Pack 90+2' (o.g.)	Stadium: Ashton Gate Stadium; Attendance: 22,580; Referee: James Linington

17 February 2018 32	Sunderland	0–2	Brentford	Sunderland
15:00 GMT	Jones (yellow card) 36'; Fletcher (yellow card) 65'; McGeady (yellow card) 74'	Report	Mokotjo 13'; Maupay 28'	Stadium: Stadium of Light; Attendance: 27,702; Referee: John Brooks

20 February 2018 33	Bolton Wanderers	1–0	Sunderland	Bolton
20:00 GMT	Clough 17'; Wheater (yellow card) 65'; Henry (yellow card) 67'; Morais (yellow card) 90+2'; Ameobi (yellow card) 90+5'	Report		Stadium: Macron Stadium; Attendance: 14,915; Referee: David Coote

24 February 2018 34	Sunderland	3–3	Middlesbrough	Sunderland
15:00 GMT	Asoro 11'; Clarke-Salter (red card) 24'; Williams 58'; McManaman 90+6'	Report	Traoré (red card) 37'; Bamford 49', 68'; Leadbitter 53' (pen.)	Stadium: Stadium of Light; Attendance: 29,048; Referee: Tim Robinson

3 March 2018 35	Millwall	1–1	Sunderland	Bermondsey, London
15:00 GMT	Hutchinson 69'; Saville (yellow card) 80'; Morison (yellow card) 90+6'	Report	Oviedo 29'; Steele (yellow card) 90+2'	Stadium: The Den; Attendance: 14,358; Referee: Andy Davies

6 March 2018 36	Sunderland	0–3	Aston Villa	Sunderland
19:45 GMT	Love (yellow card) 23'; Oviedo (yellow card) 55'	Report	Grabban 34'; Chester (yellow card) 35'; Chester 45+3'; Oviedo 66' (o.g.)	Stadium: Stadium of Light; Attendance: 26,081; Referee: Andy Madley

10 March 2018 37	Queens Park Rangers	1–0	Sunderland	Shepherd's Bush, London
15:00 GMT	Freeman (yellow card) 61'; Eze 62'; Onuoha (yellow card) 74'	Report	Steele (red card) 49'; O'Shea (yellow card) 70'	Stadium: Loftus Road; Attendance: 14,216; Referee: Robert Jones

17 March 2018 38	Sunderland	0–2	Preston North End	Sunderland
15:00 GMT	Clarke-Salter (yellow card) 34' (yellow-red card) 60'	Report	Maguire 50'; Robinson 63'; Earl (yellow card) 81'	Stadium: Stadium of Light; Attendance: 28,543; Referee: Darren Bond

30 March 2018 39	Derby County	1–4	Sunderland	Derby
12:00 BST	Vydra 42', (yellow card) 84'; Johnson (yellow card) 90'	Report	Honeyman 10'; Fletcher 36'; McGeady 50' (pen.); Koné (yellow card) 59'; Love (yellow card) 63'; Cattermole (yellow card) 67'; O'Shea (yellow card) 72', (goal) 76'	Stadium: Pride Park Stadium; Attendance: 27,890; Referee: James Linington

2 April 2018 40	Sunderland	1–3	Sheffield Wednesday	Sunderland
15:00 BST	McGeady (yellow card) 50'; Honeyman 61'	Report	Bannan (yellow card) 40'; Lucas João 59'; Lees 68'; Nuhiu 75'	Stadium: Stadium of Light; Attendance: 29,786; Referee: Simon Hooper

7 April 2018 41	Leeds United	1–1	Sunderland	Leeds
15:00 BST	Hernández 72'; O'Connor (yellow card) 75'; Alioski (yellow card) 83'; Berardi (red card); Jansson (yellow card) 90+1'	Report	Honeyman (yellow card) 12'; McNair 48'; Koné (yellow card) 70'; McManaman (yellow card) 90+1'	Stadium: Elland Road; Attendance: 30,461; Referee: Jeremy Simpson

10 April 2018 42	Sunderland	1–1	Norwich City	Sunderland
19:45 BST	Honeyman 63'	Report	Pinto 89'	Stadium: Stadium of Light; Attendance: 24,894; Referee: David Coote

14 April 2018 43	Reading	2–2	Sunderland	Reading
15:00 BST	Kelly 20' (pen.); Kermorgant 79'; Swift (yellow card) 85'	Report	McNair 47'; Cattermole 66'; Love (yellow card) 90+4'	Stadium: Madejski Stadium; Attendance: 17,348; Referee: Steve Martin

21 April 2018 44	Sunderland	1–2	Burton Albion	Sunderland
15:00 BST	McNair 34', (yellow card) 74'; Wilson (yellow card) 45'; McManaman (yellow card) 59'; Honeyman (yellow card) 90+4'; McGeady (yellow card) 90+7'; Cattermole (yellow card) 90+7'	Report	Davenport (yellow card) 45+2'; Bent 86'; Boyce 90+2', (yellow card) 90+3'	Stadium: Stadium of Light; Attendance: 25,475; Referee: Darren England

27 April 2018 45	Fulham	2–1	Sunderland	Fulham, London
19:45 BST	Piazon 45'; Mitrović 76'; Bettinelli (yellow card) 90+3'; Kamara (yellow card) 90+6'	Report	Asoro 28'; O'Shea (yellow card) 45'; Fletcher (yellow card) 61'; Steele (yellow card) 62'; McManaman (yellow card) 90+6'	Stadium: Craven Cottage; Attendance: 21,849; Referee: Peter Bankes

6 May 2018 46	Sunderland	3–0	Wolverhampton Wanderers	Sunderland
12:30 BST	Ejaria 19'; Fletcher 45'; McNair 66'	Report		Stadium: Stadium of Light; Attendance: 28,452; Referee: Jeremy Simpson

=== FA Cup ===
In the FA Cup, Sunderland entered the competition in the third round and were drawn away to Middlesbrough.

6 January 2018 Third round	Middlesbrough	2–0	Sunderland	Middlesbrough
15:00 GMT	Gestede 10'; Braithwaite 42'; Traoré (yellow card) 55'	Report	Honeyman (yellow card) 25'; Leadbitter (yellow card) 50'; Love (yellow card) 57'	Stadium: Riverside Stadium; Attendance: 26,399; Referee: Chris Kavanagh

=== EFL Cup ===
On 16 June 2017, Sunderland were drawn away to Bury in the first round. A trip to Carlisle United was announced for the second round. A third away trip in the competition against Everton was drawn for the third round.

10 August 2017 First round	Bury	0–1	Sunderland	Bury
19:45 BST		Report	Browning (yellow card) 45+1'; Khazri (yellow card) 62'; Honeyman 69'	Stadium: Gigg Lane; Attendance: 3,470; Referee: Robert Jones

22 August 2017 Second round	Carlisle United	1–2	Sunderland	Carlisle
19:45 BST	Grainger 60'	Report	Love 25'; Khazri (yellow card) 57'; Djilobodji (yellow card) 59'; Ndong (yellow card) 64'; Gooch 80'; Vaughan (yellow card) 90+6'	Stadium: Brunton Park; Attendance: 8,187; Referee: Darren Bond

20 September 2017 Third round	Everton	3–0	Sunderland	Walton
19:45 BST	Calvert-Lewin 39', 52'; Niasse 83'	Report	Gibson (yellow card) 51'	Stadium: Goodison Park; Referee: Oliver Langford

== Squad statistics ==
=== Top scorers ===
The list is sorted by league goals and then shirt number when total goals are equal.

- = Player left club mid-season

Last updated on 30 May 2018.

Rnk	Pos	No.	Player	Championship	FA Cup	EFL Cup	Total
1	FW	11	(England) Lewis Grabban*	12	0	0	12
2	MF	19	(Republic of Ireland) Aiden McGeady	7	0	0	7
2	MF	26	(England) George Honeyman	6	0	1	7
4	MF	4	(Northern Ireland) Paddy McNair	5	0	0	5
5	FW	29	(Sweden) Joel Asoro	3	0	0	3
6	DF	3	(Costa Rica) Bryan Oviedo	2	0	0	2
6	FW	9	(England) James Vaughan*	2	0	0	2
6	FW	9	(England) Ashley Fletcher	2	0	0	2
6	MF	27	(United States) Lynden Gooch	1	0	1	2
10	DF	2	(England) Billy Jones	1	0	0	1
10	MF	6	(England) Lee Cattermole	1	0	0	1
10	MF	7	(Wales) Jonny Williams	1	0	0	1
10	MF	8	(England) Jack Rodwell	1	0	0	1
10	MF	13	(England) Callum McManaman	1	0	0	1
10	DF	16	(Republic of Ireland) John O'Shea	1	0	0	1
10	FW	20	(Nigeria) Josh Maja	1	0	0	1
10	DF	21	(Wales) Adam Matthews	1	0	0	1
10	MF	53	(England) Ovie Ejaria	1	0	0	1
10	DF	22	(Scotland) Donald Love	0	0	1	1
Own Goals				3	0	3	1
Total				52	0	3	55

=== Appearances and goals ===
Last updated on 7 May 2018.

No.	Pos	Nat	Player	Total		Championship		FA Cup		EFL Cup	
No.	Pos	Nat	Player	Apps	Goals	Apps	Goals	Apps	Goals	Apps	Goals
1	GK	(England) ENG	Jason Steele	18	0	15	0	1	0	2	0
2	DF	(England) ENG	Billy Jones	24	1	19+3	1	1	0	1	0
3	DF	(Costa Rica) CRC	Bryan Oviedo	36	2	31+3	2	1	0	1	0
4	DF	(Northern Ireland) NIR	Paddy McNair	16	5	12+4	5	0	0	0	0
6	MF	(England) ENG	Lee Cattermole	35	1	34+1	1	0	0	0	0
7	MF	(Wales) WAL	Jonny Williams	13	1	7+5	1	0+1	0	0	0
8	MF	(England) ENG	Jack Rodwell	3	1	1+1	1	1	0	0	0
9	FW	(England) ENG	Ashley Fletcher	16	2	15+1	2	0	0	0	0
11	MF	(Democratic Republic of the Congo) COD	Kazenga LuaLua	6	0	0+6	0	0	0	0	0
12	GK	(Northern Ireland) NIR	Lee Camp	12	0	11+1	0	0	0	0	0
13	MF	(England) ENG	Callum McManaman	26	1	13+11	1	0+1	0	1	0
14	MF	(England) ENG	Duncan Watmore	6	0	4+2	0	0	0	0	0
15	DF	(England) ENG	Brendan Galloway	8	0	5+2	0	1	0	0	0
16	DF	(Republic of Ireland) IRL	John O'Shea	40	1	34+3	1	2	0	1	0
18	DF	(England) ENG	Tyias Browning	29	0	26+1	0	1	0	1	0
19	MF	(Republic of Ireland) IRL	Aiden McGeady	37	7	28+7	7	1+1	0	0	0
20	FW	(England) ENG	Josh Maja	18	1	6+11	1	0	0	1	0
21	DF	(Wales) WAL	Adam Matthews	37	1	25+9	1	3	0	0	0
22	DF	(Scotland) SCO	Donald Love	14	1	11	0	2	1	1	0
23	DF	(Ivory Coast) CIV	Lamine Koné	26	0	24	0	1+1	0	0	0
25	GK	(Netherlands) NED	Robbin Ruiter	21	0	20	0	1	0	0	0
26	MF	(England) ENG	George Honeyman	45	7	37+5	6	2	1	1	0
27	MF	(United States) USA	Lynden Gooch	27	2	12+12	1	2+1	1	0	0
28	MF	(England) ENG	Ethan Robson	11	0	6+3	0	0+1	0	1	0
29	FW	(Sweden) SWE	Joel Asoro	29	3	11+15	3	1+1	0	0+1	0
35	DF	(England) ENG	Jake Clarke-Salter	11	0	8+3	0	0	0	0	0
36	DF	(Republic of Ireland) IRL	Marc Wilson	22	0	20+1	0	0	0	1	0
37	MF	(England) ENG	Bali Mumba	1	0	0+1	0	0	0	0	0
40	MF	(England) ENG	Elliot Embleton	3	0	0+2	0	0	0	0+1	0
41	DF	(England) ENG	Denver Hume	1	0	0+1	0	0	0	0	0
52	MF	(England) ENG	Luke Molyneux	1	0	1	0	0	0	0	0
53	MF	(England) ENG	Ovie Ejaria	11	1	9+2	1	0	0	0	0
Players who have played for Sunderland this season but are currently out on loan:
5	DF	(Senegal) SEN	Papy Djilobodji	1	0	0	0	1	0	0	0
10	MF	(Tunisia) TUN	Wahbi Khazri	5	0	0+3	0	2	0	0	0
17	MF	(Gabon) GAB	Didier N'Dong	21	0	16+2	0	3	0	0	0
Players who have played for Sunderland this season but have left the club:
9	FW	(England) ENG	James Vaughan	27	2	15+8	2	1+2	0	0+1	0
11	FW	(England) ENG	Lewis Grabban	20	12	18+1	12	1	0	0	0
24	MF	(Republic of Ireland) IRL	Darron Gibson	18	0	12+3	0	3	0	0	0

=== Disciplinary record ===
As of 30 September 2017

No.	Pos.	Name	Championship			FA Cup			EFL Cup			Total		
No.	Pos.	Name	Booked	(yellow card) (yellow-red card)	Sent off (straight red)	Booked	(yellow card) (yellow-red card)	Sent off (straight red)	Booked	(yellow card) (yellow-red card)	Sent off (straight red)	Booked	(yellow card) (yellow-red card)	Sent off (straight red)
1	GK	Jason Steele	1									1		
3	DF	Bryan Oviedo	2									2		
5	DF	Papy Djilobodji							1			1		
6	MF	Lee Cattermole	2									2		
7	MF	Jonny Williams	1									1		
8	MF	Jack Rodwell	1									1		
9	FW	James Vaughan	3						1			4		
10	MF	Wahbi Khazri	1						2			3		
15	DF	Brendan Galloway	2									2		
17	MF	Didier N'Dong	1						1			2		
18	DF	Tyias Browning	1						1			2		
19	RW	Aiden McGeady	2									2		
23	DF	Lamine Koné	2									2		
24	MF	Darron Gibson							1			1		
27	MF	Lynden Gooch	1									1		
36	DF	Marc Wilson	1									1		
Total			21	0	0	0	0	0	7	0	0	28	0	0
