= An Enemy Within =

Upcoming thriller film

- Release poster
- Directed by: John Michael Kennedy
- Written by: John Michael Kennedy
- Produced by: John Michael Kennedy; Adam Beasley; Guy Davies; Michael Jefferson
- Starring: William Moseley; Patrick Baladi; Tristan Gemmill; Kim Spearman; Alexander Lincoln
- Cinematography: Lorenzo Levrini
- Edited by: Gustav Lindquist
- Music by: Caleb Blood
- Production companies: Volition Media Partners; Zebrafish Media; Attic Light Films; Gosdom Entertainment; Create Entertainment
- Distributed by: Saban Films
- Release dates: October 10, 2025 (British Urban Film Festival); May 15, 2026 (United States)
- Running time: 102 minutes
- Language: English

An Enemy Within is a 2025 American thriller film written and directed by John Michael Kennedy. It stars William Moseley, Patrick Baladi, Tristan Gemmill, Kim Spearman, and Alexander Lincoln. Saban Films released the film on May 15, 2026.

== Premise ==
On his wedding night, an assassin called The Wolf orders Caleb Wingate to kill his father-in-law before midnight. If Wingate fails to do so, the caller threatens to kill his bride.

== Cast ==
- William Moseley
- Patrick Baladi
- Tristan Gemmill
- Kim Spearman
- Alexander Lincoln
- Toyin Omari-Kinch
- Frances Wilding
- Harrison Daniels

== Reception ==
In a negative review, Brian Orndorf of Blu-ray.com called An Enemy Within "an overlong movie in dire need of editorial tightening, allowing viewers to feel the messiness of everything in a more visceral manner".
