= John Kennedy (Utah politician) =

American politician (1847–1928)

John Kennedy Jr. (1847–1928) was an American politician in Utah and leader in the Church of Jesus Christ of Latter-day Saints (LDS Church). He was the bishop of the Argyle Ward of the LDS Church in Argyle, Utah, during its entire existence. Kennedy was also a member of the Utah State Legislature, the Rich County Commission, and a justice of the peace.

Kennedy was born 12 October 1847 in Kilmarnock, Ayrshire, Scotland, to John Kennedy and his wife Elizabeth Black. In the 1860s, he joined the LDS Church along with the rest of his family and in 1870 sailed to America on the ship Colorado with his brother James. The Kennedy brothers worked as coal miners in Pennsylvania and then in Almy, Wyoming. Soon after arriving in Almy, Kennedy married Hannah Simpson. John and Hannah became the parents of 16 children.

Kennedy later moved to Argyle, Utah, where he worked as a farmer and rancher. He served as bishop of the Argyle Ward from its organization in 1895 until it was merged with the Randolph Ward in 1913. He died March 5, 1928, in Randolph, Utah.
