= John J. Kennedy (political scientist) =

American political scientist and author

John J. Kennedy (born in 1961) is an American political scientist and author. He teaches at West Chester University. He is a specialist on elections.

== Early life and education ==
Kennedy is originally from North Catasauqua, Pennsylvania. He attended Catasauqua High School. Kennedy received his bachelor's degree in public administration at Kutztown University of Pennsylvania in 1984 and his Master in Public Administration from the same institution in 1988. After spending some time at the University of Houston, he earned his PhD from Temple University in 1996. Kennedy's dissertation was entitled "The State of the Pennsylvania Legislature in the 1990s."

== Career ==
He joined West Chester University in 1997 as an adjunct professor. His first book, The Contemporary Pennsylvania Legislature, was published in 1999. Kennedy created a Campaigns and Elections class in 2002 in which students represent political candidates and hold a rally and debate. His second book, Pennsylvania Elections, was published in 2005. In 2006, he was made an associate professor the following year. He served as statewide chair of the Association of Pennsylvania State Colleges and University Faculties from 2005 to 2006. His third book, Pennsylvania Government and Politics, was published in 2017.

Kennedy has written editorials for The Philadelphia Inquirer and other newspapers and has been interviewed by The Washington Post, Los Angeles Times. PBS, and Al-Jazeera. He has conducted several statewide public opinion polls through WCU’s Center for Social and Economic Research, which has developed a reputation as one on the most accurate polling organizations. He argued in a 2014 article that the most important development in Pennsylvania politics has been the dealignment of the Philadelphia suburbs over the decades from solidly Republican to leaning Democratic which hurts Republicans monetarily and politically.

In 2006, Kennedy was selected by The Capitol Centennial Commission to speak in the Pennsylvania House of Representatives in an event celebrating the 100th anniversary of the rebuilt chamber. In 2015, he was selected as Keynote speaker for the Undergraduate Research at the Capitol–Pennsylvania (URC-PA) Poster Conference held in Harrisburg, Pennsylvania. His most recent book, Pennsylvania Government and Politics, was published in 2017. Kennedy is an advisory board member for "Commonwealth, A Journal of Pennsylvania Policy and Politics."

In December 2017, Kennedy testified as an expert witness for the League of Women Voters in its attempt to invalidate the 2011 electoral map. He explained that how the map changed over time, digging through old maps from the 1960s and argued that it was drawn by Pennsylvania's Republican-majority legislature to heavily favor Republican congressional candidates. As evidence, Kennedy used several complex quantitative analyses. He explained that a single King of Prussia steakhouse was all that connected two parts of the 7th congressional district. Also, he argued that Harrisburg was "cracked" between the fourth and eleventh districts to create Republican majorities in both places. As a result, he was instrumental in the 2018 Supreme Court redistricting in Pennsylvania that drew up all new maps. Kennedy believes that “communities of interest” should be grouped in the same district and took exception to Allentown and Hershey being in the same district. “Communities are important to our identities as Pennsylvanians. Residents of [Delaware County] have a different identity from residents of Amish Country,” he said. Kennedy held a forum called "Pennsylvania in Disarray: Congressional Redistricting 2018" in April 2018. In the fall of 2021, he was appointed by Governor Tom Wolf to serve on the Pennsylvania Redistricting Advisory Council, which was established to provide guidance to the governor and assist in the review of the congressional redistricting plan Governor Wolf Map said.[7]

In his book on gerrymandering, Unrigged, author David Daley described Kennedy’s testimony: “He delivered a tour de force of the state’s political geography.” Daley continued:

The map made it easy. The map told the story." Kennedy humbly tells me, tucking into a salmon burger. His head is shaved and he has the solid build of a high school halfback. He collects vinyl and loves the Beach Boys. And he’s an evangelist for the communities in this state. "I've lived in Pennsylvania most of my life. These communities are important to me. It’s important that the Lehigh Valley. . . have its identity intact. That it has its own congressional district. That it’s not splintered, or just a political tool to maximize political gain." After all, he points out, the local baseball team is the Lehigh Valley Iron Pigs, not the Allentown—Hershey Iron Pigs. It's the Lehigh Valley Transit Authority, the Lehigh Valley International Airport. There’s no nonpolitical reason to split these cities, he says, though many of them were stripped for red and blue parts. . . The 2011 map, Kennedy told the court, "carves up Pennsylvania's communities of interest at an unprecedented level and—and contains more anomalies than ever before." Kennedy narrated each ludicrous twist, aided by aerial maps overlaid by the crazy lines and color-coded to show political performance. "In the courtroom," says Jacobson, "it was devastating."

In the fall of 2021, he was appointed by Governor Tom Wolf to serve on the Pennsylvania Redistricting Advisory Council, which was established to provide guidance to the governor and assist in the review of the congressional redistricting plan.

== Personal life ==
He lives in Montgomery County, Pennsylvania, with his wife, Kelli and two children, Clare and Shannon. His wife is a West Chester University graduate.

== Bibliography ==
- Kennedy, John J. (1999). The Contemporary Pennsylvania Legislature. University Press of America. ISBN 0761815198.
- Kennedy, John J. (2005). Pennsylvania Elections. University Press of America. ISBN 0761864423.
- Kennedy, John J. (2016). "Sometimes It Does Matter: The 2016 Presidential Primary Election in Pennsylvania". Commonwealth. 18 (2). doi:10.15367/cjppp.v18i2.118.
- Kennedy, John J. (2017). Pennsylvania Government and Politics. Cognella Academic Publishing. ISBN 978-1516501588.
