= John Kennedy (Medal of Honor) =

- Born: May 14, 1834; Cavan, Ireland
- Died: September 28, 1910 (aged 76); Laurel, Maryland, US
- Burial place: Oakland Cemetery Little Rock, Arkansas
- Military career
- Allegiance: United States of America; Union
- Branch: United States Army; Union Army
- Service years: ? - 1891
- Rank: Ordnance Sergeant
- Conflicts: American Civil War
- Awards: Medal of Honor

John Kennedy (May 14, 1834 – September 28, 1910) was born a British subject in Ireland, and became an American citizen and a private in the Union Army. He received the United States military's highest decoration for bravery, the Medal of Honor, for his actions during the Battle of Trevilian Station in the American Civil War.

== Biography ==
He was born May 14, 1834, and at the Battle of Trevilian Station in Virginia on June 11, 1864, he and four other soldiers were assigned to a twelve-pound-capacity brass artillery piece under direct command of Lt. William Egan, as part of the battery commanded by Lt. Alexander Pennington, within Gen. George Armstrong Custer's Michigan Cavalry Brigade. A squadron of cavalry led by Confederate Capt. Daniel A. Grimsley attacked their position, and a retreat was ordered. Kennedy and Pvt. Charles O'Neil remained at the cannon to cover the retreat of the rest of their unit, at some point becoming cut off from retreating themselves. They exhausted first their grape shot and canister shot, then their rifle and then pistol ammunition, finally being captured while continuing resistance with handspikes and sponge staffs. (Their position and the cannon were shortly recaptured in a Union artillery and cavalry counter-attack.)

The captured privates were imprisoned at the Andersonville prison; Kennedy survived, and served after the war in the Regular Army, advancing to the rank of ordnance sergeant and retiring in 1891. He was nominated for the Medal of Honor in 1892 by Lt. Carle E. Woodruff, and this was endorsed by Pennington, at that point a major.

He died September 28, 1910, and is buried in Oakland Cemetery Little Rock, Arkansas.

== Medal of Honor citation ==
His Medal of Honor citation in 1892 described his actions as

Remained at his gun, resisting with its implements the advancing cavalry, and thus secured the retreat of his detachment.

== See also ==
- List of Medal of Honor recipients
- List of American Civil War Medal of Honor recipients: G–L
