= John Kennedy of Killearnan =

John Kennedy (1772 – 10 January 1841) was a Scottish minister of the Church of Scotland who served at Killearnan from 1814 until his death.

== Biography ==
Kennedy was born in Kishorn in 1772, and studied at King's College, Aberdeen. He was licensed to preach on 24 November 1795 and served as a schoolmaster in Lochcarron before being ordained on 5 December 1798 as minister at Lochbroom. He married Jessie Mackenzie in 1808, and they had nine children, including John Kennedy of Dingwall.

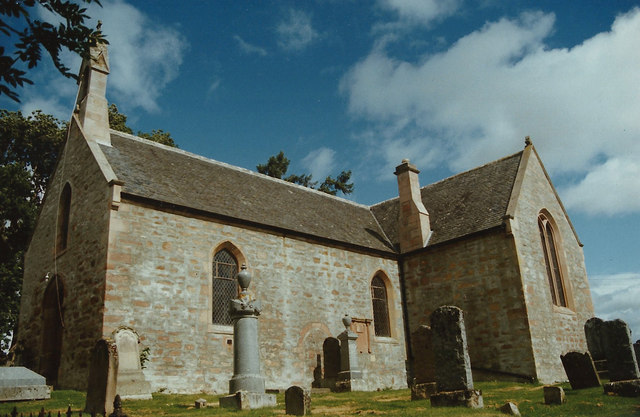
Killearnan Parish Church, where Kennedy served for 26 years

In 1921, Donald Beaton wrote, "Of all the northern ministers there is scarcely any name that stands higher in the estimation of the Church of God than that of the Rev. John Kennedy, minister of Killearnan." Hew Scott described him in 1928 as "one of the most popular ministers in the North Highlands for his saintly character, his acknowledged abilities and preaching powers."

Leonella Longmore calls Kennedy a "Billy Graham of the early nineteenth century" and notes that his "preaching was such that to hear him some of the faithful would walk twenty to thirty miles every Sunday."
