= John Kennedy (cricketer) =

English cricketer

John Maxwell Kennedy (15 December 1931 – 13 December 2023) was a cricketer who played first-class cricket in 31 matches for Warwickshire between 1960 and 1962. He was born at Barton-upon-Irwell, Manchester, England.

Kennedy was a right-handed middle-order batsman. He scored 63 on debut against Oxford University in June 1960 and was then picked for a few more games that season, though he did not pass 50 again that year. In one of his 1960 matches, a home game against Somerset that was drifting towards a draw, he was put on to bowl for the final overs of the Somerset second innings before close of play: in nine balls, he took two wickets for just one run, and his victims were both Test players, Abbas Ali Baig and Colin McCool. Despite this success, he never bowled his right arm off breaks again.

Kennedy played fairly regularly for Warwickshire in 1961, achieving 756 runs in the season at an average of 27.00, but his highest score was only 78. He was less successful in 1962, though his 94 against Oxford University was the highest score of his first-class career, and he did not play any further first-class cricket after the end of the season. In 1964, he played Minor Counties cricket in a few matches for Staffordshire.
