= John Kennedy (Canadian football) =

Canadian football player

Profile
- Positions: Guard, Tackle

Personal information
- Born: May 27, 1950 (age 76); Oshawa, Ontario, Canada
- Listed height: 6 ft 0 in (1.83 m)
- Listed weight: 240 lb (109 kg)

Career history
- 1972: Ottawa Rough Riders
- 1973: BC Lions
- 1974: Montreal Alouettes
- 1975–1976: Toronto Argonauts

John Kennedy (born May 27, 1950) is a Canadian former football player who played for the Ottawa Rough Riders, BC Lions, Montreal Alouettes and Toronto Argonauts in the Canadian Football League. Previously, he played football at Carleton University and Wilfrid Laurier University. He tried out for the Detroit Wheels of the World Football League in September 1974 after being released by the Alouettes.
