= John Kennedy (rugby union) =

Irish rugby union player

- Full name: John Murray Prior Kennedy
- Born: 19 September 1859 Spafield, Tipperary, Ireland
- Died: 21 April 1941 (aged 81) Tullamore, Offaly, Ireland

Rugby union career
- Position: Forward
International career
Years	Team	Apps	(Points)
1882–84	Ireland	2	(0)

John Murray Prior Kennedy (19 September 1859 – 21 April 1941) was an Irish international rugby union player.

Kennedy was raised at Spafalid House in the village of Borris-in-Ossory, County Laois. A forward, Kennedy was capped twice for Ireland, with solitary appearances in 1882 and 1884, both against Wales. He studied medicine at the Royal University of Ireland and in 1888 was appointed medical officer to the Tullamore jail.

== See also ==
- List of Ireland national rugby union players
