= Robbin Ruiter =

Dutch footballer (born 1987)

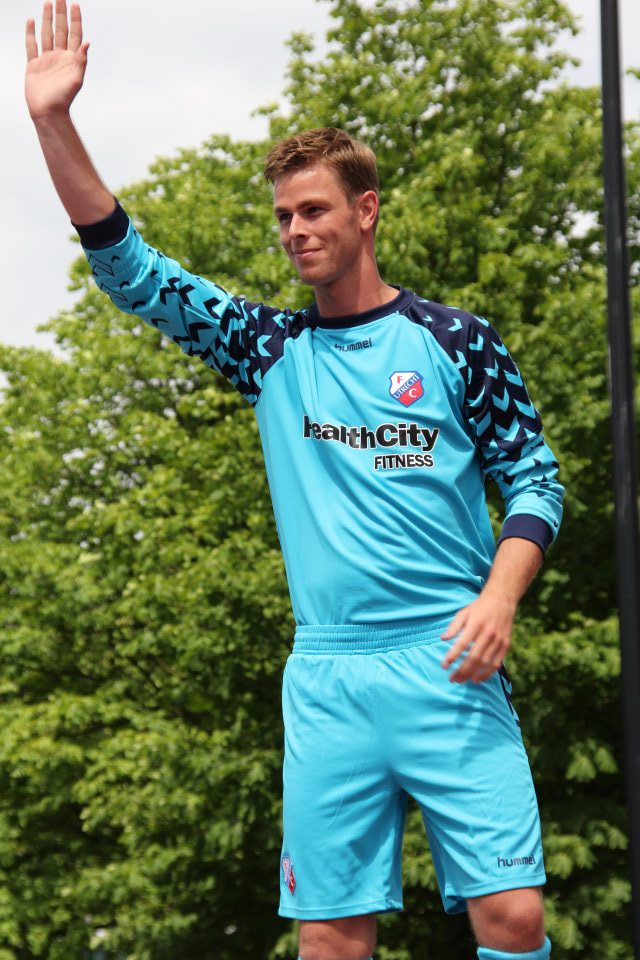
- Ruiter in 2012

Personal information
- Date of birth: 25 March 1987 (age 39)
- Place of birth: Amsterdam, Netherlands
- Height: 1.96 m (6 ft 5 in)
- Position: Goalkeeper

Youth career
- RKAV Volendam

Senior career*
Years	Team	Apps	(Gls)
2009–2012	Volendam	70	(0)
2012–2017	Utrecht	142	(0)
2017–2019	Sunderland	21	(0)
2019–2020	PSV	1	(0)
2019	→ Jong PSV	1	(0)
2020–2022	Willem II	11	(0)
2022–2023	Cambuur	16	(0)
2023	Nordsjælland	0	(0)
- * Club domestic league appearances and goals as of 28 May 2023

Robbin Ruiter (born 25 March 1987) is a Dutch former professional footballer who played as a goalkeeper.

== Career ==
Born in Amsterdam, North Holland, Ruiter started his senior career with FC Volendam in 2009.

=== FC Utrecht ===
In April 2012, he signed a pre-contract to join FC Utrecht in July. In his first official appearance for Utrecht, he singled himself out with a stand-out performance, by stopping three one-on-one chances against Feyenoord.

=== Sunderland ===
He signed for Sunderland in August 2017 following a successful trial.

=== PSV ===
In June 2019, he returned to the Eredivisie, joining PSV on a free transfer.

=== Willem II ===
On 30 July 2020, Ruiter joined Willem II for an undisclosed fee on a two-year deal with the option of a third. On 31 January 2022, Ruiter and Willem II agreed to dissolve the contract.

=== Cambuur ===
On 23 July 2022, Ruiter joined Cambuur for the 2022–23 season.

=== FC Nordsjælland ===
On 3 December 2023 Danish Superliga club FC Nordsjælland confirmed that they had signed a contract until the end of the year, as the club was struggling with injury problems at the goalkeeper position.

== Career statistics ==
As of match played 15 June 2019

Appearances and goals by club, season and competition
Club	Season	League			National cup		League Cup		Other		Total	
Club	Season	Division	Apps	Goals	Apps	Goals	Apps	Goals	Apps	Goals	Apps	Goals
Volendam	2009–10	Eerste Divisie	21	0	0	0	—		0	0	21	0
Volendam	2010–11	Eerste Divisie	24	0	2	0	—		4 (Note: Appearances in the Eerste Divisie/Eredivisie promotion/relegation play-offs)	0	30	0
Volendam	2011–12	Eerste Divisie	25	0	2	0	—		0	0	27	0
Volendam	Total		70	0	4	0	—		4	0	78	0
Utrecht	2012–13	Eredivisie	37	0	1	0	—		0	0	38	0
Utrecht	2013–14	Eredivisie	30	0	4	0	—		2 (Note: Appearances in the Europa League)	0	36	0
Utrecht	2014–15	Eredivisie	31	0	1	0	—		0	0	32	0
Utrecht	2015–16	Eredivisie	29	0	5	0	—		0	0	34	0
Utrecht	2016–17	Eredivisie	15	0	2	0	—		0	0	17	0
Utrecht	Total		142	0	13	0	—		2	0	157	0
Sunderland	2017–18	Championship	20	0	0	0	1	0	0	0	21	0
Sunderland	2018–19	League One	1	0	0	0	0	0	6 (Note: Appearances in the EFL Trophy)	0	7	0
Sunderland	Total		21	0	0	0	1	0	6	0	28	0
Career total			233	0	17	0	1	0	12	0	263	0

== Honours ==
Sunderland

- EFL Trophy runner-up: 2018–19
