= John Paul Kennedy =

American judge

Hon. John Paul Kennedy

Utah Third District Court
- In office November 2004 – January 1, 2015
- Appointed by: Olene Walker

John Paul Kennedy (fl. 1966 – 2015) is a retired Third Judicial District court judge in Salt Lake County, Utah. He was appointed to the bench in 2004 and retired as of January 1, 2015, to begin private practice as a mediator/arbitrator.

== Early years and education ==
John Paul Kennedy was born and raised in Minneapolis, Minnesota. He resided there through completion of high school. In elementary school he lived for two years in the area of Boston, Massachusetts, and four years in Milwaukee, Wisconsin. He attended Harvard University graduating with honors in 1963. In his senior year, he married his wife, whom he met while attending Harvard. Judge Kennedy was captain of the Harvard Freshman and Varsity fencing teams. He received his law degree from Stanford University in 1966, where he was a member of the board of editors of the Stanford Law Review.

Kennedy authored articles for the Stanford Law Review such as "Toward Expediting Labor Injunctions under § 10(l) of the Taft-Hartley Act" and "Res Ipsa Loquitur Requires Nursery School to Explain Pupil's Injuries: Res Ipsa Loquitur. Burden of Proof. Infants. Schools and School Districts".

== Legal career ==
During his 30+ years as a practicing attorney, Kennedy has been involved in some significant litigation. He practiced law in Chicago, Illinois, from 1966 until 1972. Upon arriving in Utah, Kennedy was a partner in various Salt Lake City law firms, including Boyden & Kennedy, Nielson & Senior, and Edwards, McCoy & Kennedy. During his career, his practice focused on labor law, employment relations, and Indian affairs. He served as attorney general or assistant attorney general for seven Indian tribal governments. He is a member of the American Bar Association, the Utah State Bar Association and the Salt Lake County Bar Association. Following retirement from the bench, he re-entered private practice as a mediator/arbitrator under the name John Kennedy Mediation LLC.

== Notable Cases as a Lawyer ==
=== Supreme Court of the United States ===
- Digital Equipment Corporation, Petitioner v. Desktop Direct, Inc. (1994)

=== US District Courts ===
- Sidney v. MacDonald (1982)
- Cleveland v. Andress (1978)
- Hopi Tribe v. Watt (1982)
- Utah v. United States DOI

=== US Courts of Appeals ===
- McCurdy v. Steele (1974)
- Desktop Direct v. Digital Equip. Corp. (1993)
- Sekaquaptewa v. MacDonald (1978, 1980)
- Stout v. Te-Moak Tribe of W. Shoshone (2000)

== Judicial career ==
Judge Kennedy was certified by the Utah Judicial Council to stand for retention in 2008 after having satisfactorily pass his judicial performance evaluations by attorneys and jurors. Judge Kennedy was successfully retained in office by Utah voters. The litigation section of the Utah State Bar has published a "Bench Book" outlining the courtroom practices and preferences of Judge Kennedy.

== Personal background ==
In 2001, Judge Kennedy chose to take a sabbatical to serve a mission for the Church of Jesus Christ of Latter-day Saints in St. Petersburg, Russia. (He was the president of the church's mission in St. Petersburg.) He remained there until his return to Utah in September 2004. During this time abroad, he learned to speak some conversational Russian . He and his wife have 6 children.
