= John Kennedy of Dingwall =

Scottish minister (1819–1884)

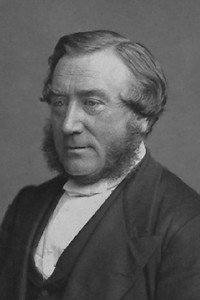
John Kennedy of Dingwall

John W. Kennedy (15 August 1819 – 28 April 1884), usually known as John Kennedy of Dingwall or simply Dr Kennedy at the popular level, was a Scottish minister of the Free Church of Scotland. He was minister of just one church, in Dingwall, for forty years from his ordination in 1844 until his death.

== Biography ==
Kennedy was born in Killearnan and studied at King's College, Aberdeen. He was converted in 1841, after he had already started training for the ministry, and shortly after the death of his father, John Kennedy of Killearnan. Kennedy was licensed to preach by the established Church of Scotland in September 1843, but then joined the Free Church, being inducted into the newly formed congregation at Dingwall in February 1844. He married Mary MacKenzie in 1848.

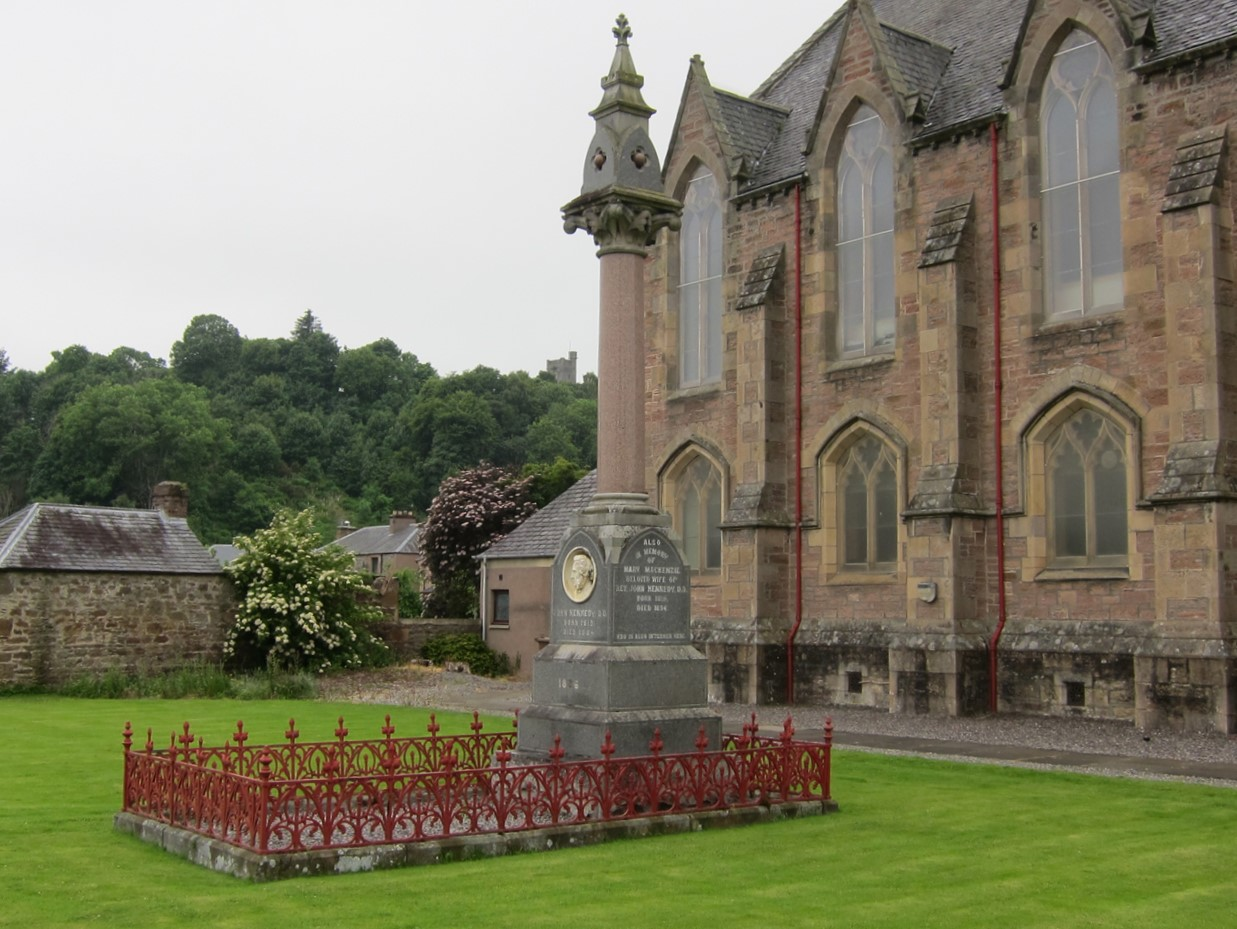
A memorial to Kennedy outside the Dingwall Free Church.

Kennedy became the leader of the Highland Evangelicals. According to John Noble, "Christ was the centre and sun of his preaching." Alasdair J. Macleod argues that Kennedy "emphasised personal piety, self-examination of religious experience, and theological orthodoxy."

Kennedy championed exclusive psalmody and the doctrine of limited atonement, and was opposed to confessional revision, union with the United Presbyterian Church (which eventually occurred in 1900), disestablishmentarianism, and instruments in worship. He also spoke against the higher criticism of William Robertson Smith and what he called the "hyper-evangelism" of Dwight L. Moody.

In 1861, Kennedy wrote The Days of the Fathers in Ross-shire and in 1866 The Apostle of the North, a biography of John Macdonald. He was granted an honorary Doctor of Divinity degree by the University of Aberdeen in 1873.

Kennedy was allied to Hugh Martin and James Begg in theological causes. He was also friends with Charles Spurgeon, who after Kennedy's death said of him, "True as steel and firm as a rock, he was also wonderfully tender and sympathetic." According to John Macleod, "the great Puritans had no more eminent successor in the Scottish ministry in the 19th century."
