= Jon Kennedy (footballer) =

English footballer (born 1980)

Personal information
- Full name: Jon Kennedy
- Date of birth: 30 November 1980 (age 45)
- Place of birth: Rotherham, England
- Position: Goalkeeper

Senior career*
Years	Team	Apps	(Gls)
1999–2000	Worksop Town		
2000–2003	Sunderland	0	(0)
2000	→ Blackpool (loan)	6	(0)
2002	→ Gateshead (loan)		
2003–2004	Accrington Stanley		
2004–2005	Witton Albion		
2005–2006	Halifax Town		
2006–2007	Lancaster City		
2007–2008	Witton Albion		
2008	Droylsden		
2008–?	FC Halifax Town		
?–2017	Worksop Town		
2017–Present	Retford Football Club	200	(0)
- * Club domestic league appearances and goals

Jon Kennedy (born 30 November 1980) is an English former professional footballer who played as a goalkeeper for Sunderland.
