= Luke Ayling =

English association football player (born 1991)

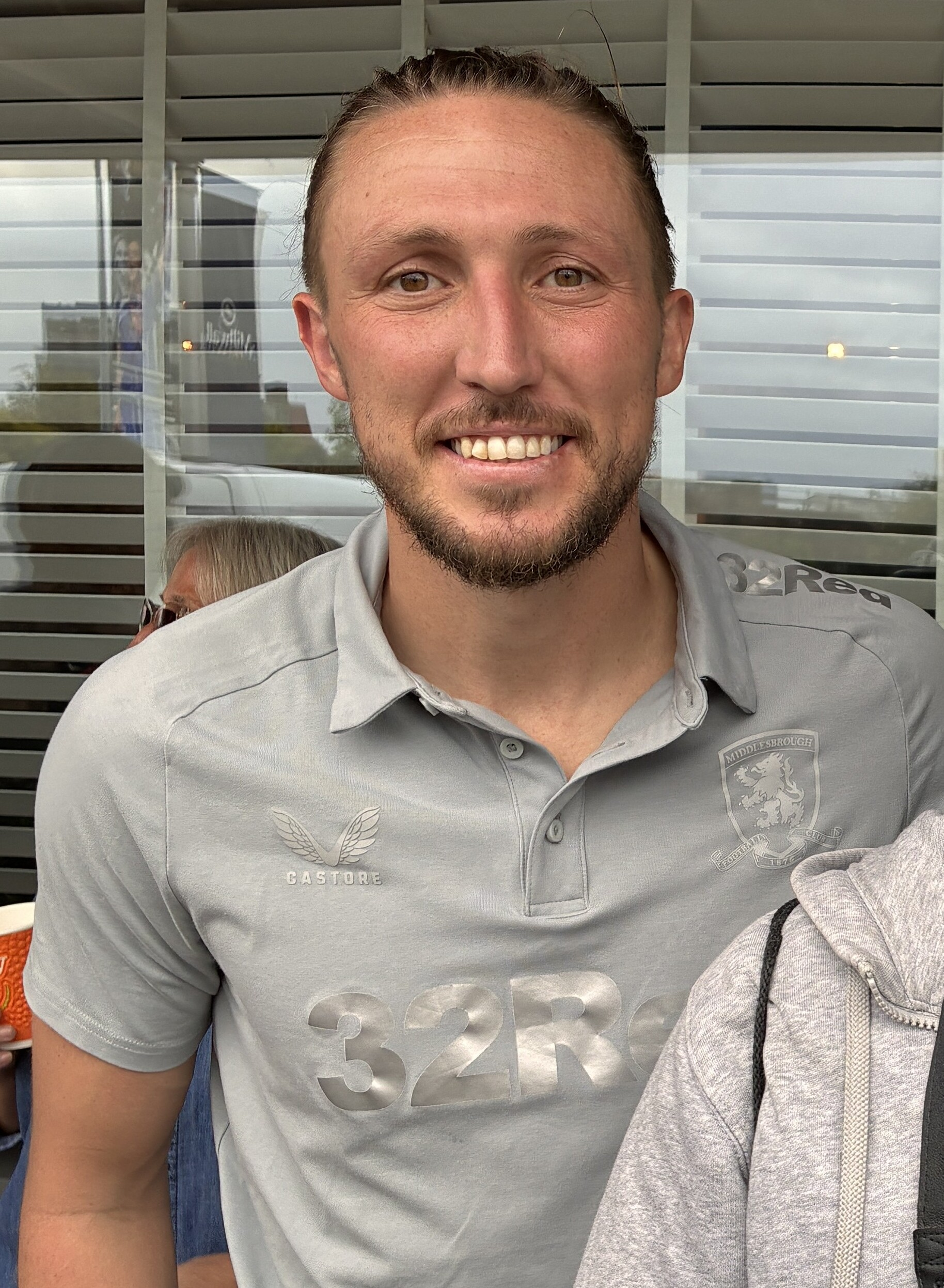
- Ayling with Middlesbrough in 2025

Personal information
- Full name: Luke David Weller-Ayling
- Date of birth: 25 August 1991 (age 35)
- Place of birth: Lambeth, England
- Height: 6 ft 0 in (1.83 m)
- Positions: Right-back; centre-back

Team information
- Current team: Middlesbrough
- Number: 12

Youth career
- 1999–2009: Arsenal

Senior career*
Years	Team	Apps	(Gls)
2009–2010	Arsenal	0	(0)
2010	→ Yeovil Town (loan)	4	(0)
2010–2014	Yeovil Town	162	(2)
2014–2016	Bristol City	80	(4)
2016–2024	Leeds United	251	(11)
2024	→ Middlesbrough (loan)	19	(0)
2024–	Middlesbrough	80	(1)
- * Club domestic league appearances and goals as of 2 November 2026 (UTC)

Luke David Weller-Ayling (born 25 August 1991) is an English professional footballer who plays as a defender for and captains EFL Championship club Middlesbrough. Usually a right-back, he can also play as a centre-back.

Ayling began his career at Arsenal joining the club at the age of 8. He was part of Arsenal youth team's double-winning team of the 2008–09 season, before signing his first professional contract in July 2009. Ayling was loaned out to Yeovil Town in March 2010 and played four matches. At the end of the season he agreed a permanent deal with Yeovil. After four seasons with Yeovil, Ayling signed for Bristol City where he played until 2016 when he signed a deal with Leeds United, where he was a mainstay as Leeds won the 2019–20 EFL Championship, under manager Marcelo Bielsa. He signed for Middlesbrough on loan in January 2024, and later joined the side permanently in May 2024.

== Career ==
=== Arsenal ===
Ayling was born in Lambeth, London. He joined Arsenal at the age of eight despite being a Chelsea fan, progressing through the youth teams, playing alongside Jack Wilshere and Kyle Bartley, before signing scholarship forms with the club in the summer of 2007. He featured in the Reserves whilst he was still a schoolboy, and was an integral part of Arsenal youth team's Premier Academy League and FA Youth Cup double-winning team of the 2008–09 season, forming a crucial defensive partnership with Kyle Bartley. In July 2009, he signed his first professional contract with Arsenal.

Ayling's only call into the first-team squad came during the 2009–10 season. He was an unused substitute for a dead rubber 1–0 UEFA Champions League group stage defeat to Greek team Olympiacos on 9 December 2009. He departed the club in June 2010 after his contract expired.

=== Yeovil Town ===
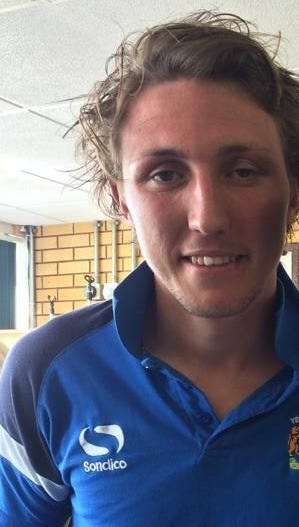
Ayling pictured with Yeovil Town in 2014

In March 2010, Ayling joined EFL League One club Yeovil Town on loan for an initial month, and on 2 April 2010, made his professional debut as a second-half substitute in a 0–0 draw away at Southend United. His loan was extended until the end of the season, He played four matches in total, including his first league start in the final match of the season against Brighton & Hove Albion, on 8 May 2010.

On 30 June 2010, Ayling agreed a permanent contract with Yeovil. He made his debut in a 2–1 victory over Leyton Orient. He made forty appearances in his first full season with Yeovil but had discipline issues, receiving thirteen yellow cards and two red cards. On 19 May 2013, he played in the 2013 League One play-off final at Wembley Stadium as Yeovil beat Brentford 2–1 to earn promotion to the Championship.

After relegation from the Championship during the 2013–14 season, his contract expired in June 2014. After rejecting the offer of a new contract at Yeovil, he left the club.

=== Bristol City ===
Following his departure from Yeovil Town, Ayling signed for Bristol City on 8 July 2014 for an undisclosed compensation fee, signing a three-year deal. He made his debut on 9 August 2014 in their opening day victory over Sheffield United.

During the 2014–15 season, Ayling won the Football League Trophy, with Bristol City beating Walsall 2–0 at Wembley Stadium on 22 March 2015. He played in 58 matches that season in all competitions for Bristol City as they were crowned League One champions and earned promotion to the Championship following a 0–0 draw at home to Coventry City on 18 April 2015. Playing 33 times either playing right-back or centre-back during the 2015–16 season in the Championship, Ayling's form at the back helped Bristol City retain their Championship status.

=== Leeds United ===
==== 2016–2020 ====
Ayling signed for Championship rivals Leeds United for a fee of £200,000 in August 2016 after former Arsenal teammate Kyle Bartley recommended him to new head coach Garry Monk via a text message. Following an injury to right-back Gaetano Berardi in the opening game against Queens Park Rangers, Monk decided to act and sign him on a three-year deal. The fee would later be considered one of the biggest bargains in the club's recent history, as Ayling went on to become a seminal figure in the club's resurgence and promotion to the Premier League four years later.

Ayling's maiden season with Leeds saw the Yorkshire club compete as genuine promotion contenders for the first time in years, characterised by a solid defence of Pontus Jansson, Bartley, Berardi and Ayling. Leeds beat promotion rivals Brighton & Hove Albion 2–0 to move into fourth place with only six games remaining, but only won one of those remaining games as they slid to seventh place and narrowly missed out on the play-offs. However, the campaign proved to be a turning point for United with attendances up by almost a third, and the completion of Andrea Radrizzani's takeover offering new hope. Ayling, along with teammates Liam Cooper, Stuart Dallas, Kalvin Phillips and Pablo Hernandez provided much-needed stability after years of questionable recruitment.

The following 2017–18 season started brightly under new manager Thomas Christiansen with Leeds topping the table after nine games and the right–back signing a new four–year deal with the club in the autumn. They were still in the play-off positions – with Ayling an ever-present – by the time they faced Nottingham Forest on New Year's Day. During the 0–0 draw, he sustained an ankle injury following a tackle by former Leeds teammate Liam Bridcutt, ruling him out for the rest of the season. The Whites only won one of their 17 games and slipped in the bottom half of the table, before Ayling returned ahead of schedule in the final game of the season against Queens Park Rangers.

The summer of 2018 saw the appointment of Marcelo Bielsa as head coach, as Leeds again competed for promotion back to the Premier League. Ayling achieved personal milestones during the season, with his first goal for the club coming against Rotherham United and his 100th appearance later being made at home to Swansea City. He also began deputising for Liam Cooper as captain. He made 42 appearances as Leeds slowly lost their grip on automatic promotion, having led the division at Christmas, before losing to Derby County in the play-offs.

After being injured towards the start of 2019–20 pre-season training, Ayling missed all the pre-season games and the start of the new season after undergoing ankle surgery. On 8 August 2019, it was revealed that Leeds had rejected bids for Ayling during the 2019 transfer window in order to keep him at the club.

He signed a new four-year contract with the club in October 2019. His first goal of the 2019–20 season came on 29 December 2019, in a 5–4 victory in a dramatic win against Birmingham City, with Ayling scoring a long range volley. On 30 December 2019, he was chosen as the right-back for the "Football League Team of the decade" by The Guardian.

On 8 January 2020, after impressive performances during the month of December, Ayling won the EFL Championship PFA Player of the Month award for December 2019. His goalscoring form continued into February and March, where he scored the solitary goal against Bristol City on 15 February, in a crucial home win that kept Leeds in second place behind West Bromwich Albion, bucking the trend of Leeds' three prior winless results, and his "stunning volley" in Leeds' 2–0 defeat of Huddersfield Town on 7 March that put the team back on top of the Championship. His performances in February saw him awarded the EFL Championship Player of the Month title.

After the English professional football season was paused in March 2020 due to the impact of the COVID-19 pandemic on association football, after the season was resumed during June, Ayling earned promotion to the Premier League with Leeds becoming the EFL Championship Champions for the 2019–20 season in July after the successful resumption of the season. Ayling won Leeds' goal of the season award for his volley against Huddersfield Town at the club's end of season awards on 24 July 2020. On 7 August, he was named in The Guardian's EFL Championship team of the season for 2019–20.

On 19 August 2020, Ayling won the EFL Championship PFA Fans' Player of the Year award for 2019–20. On 8 September 2020, he was named in Professional Footballers' Association's 2019–20 EFL Championship Team of the Season.

==== 2020–2024 ====
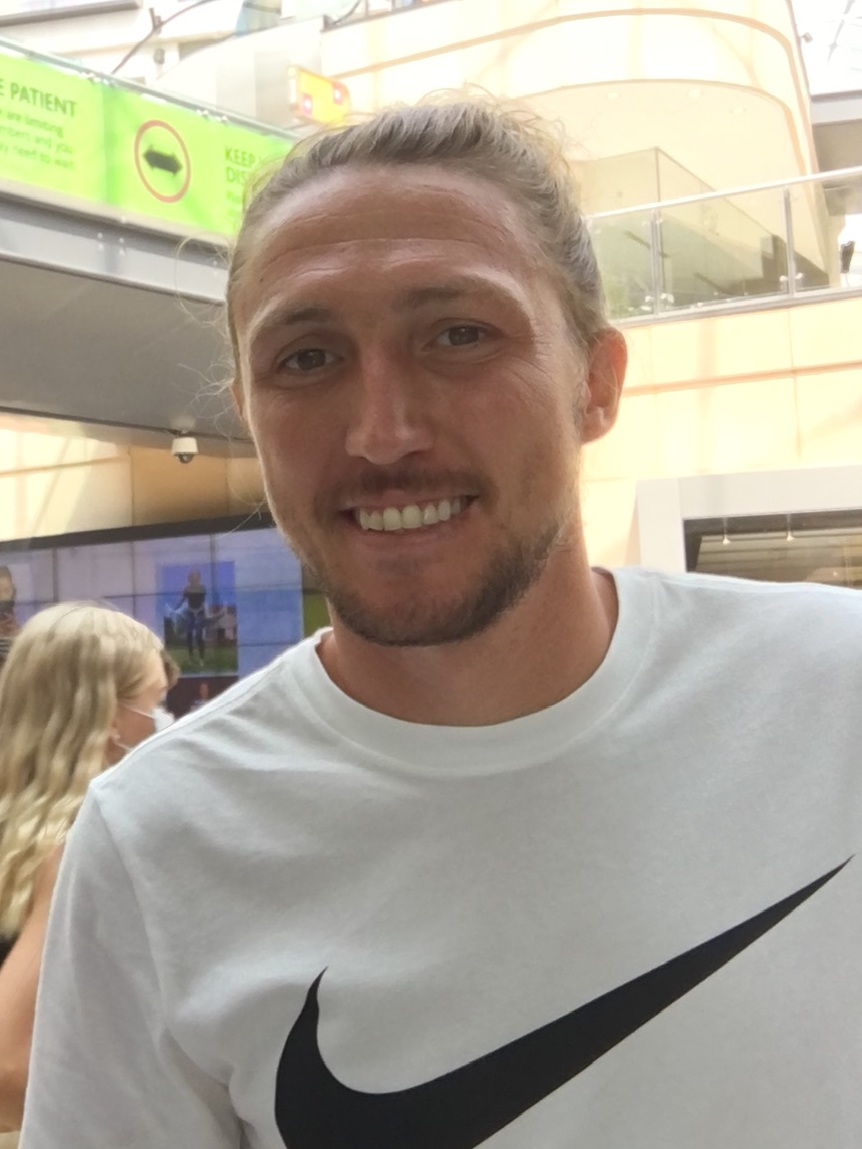
Ayling in 2020

Ayling made his 2020–21 Premier League debut in the first match of the season against Liverpool on 12 September 2020, starting and captaining Leeds in the 4–3 defeat at Anfield to the reigning champions, and went on to make a total of 38 league appearances for the season.

He scored his first goal for Leeds in the Premier League in the 2021–22 season opener, coming in a 5–1 defeat to rivals Manchester United at Old Trafford. This was nominated as one of the Premier League's Goals of the Month for August. A 17 September knee injury in a 1–1 draw at Newcastle United (a game in which Patrick Bamford also suffered an ankle injury) saw Ayling sidelined for almost three months while he had a minor operation to fix his knee. In his return game on 5 December, where he was in the starting lineup, Ayling provided the assist for a 94th-minute equaliser by Bamford (making his return in the same game) in a 2–2 home draw with Brentford.

On 12 December 2021, Ayling joined a select group of just 70 players who made over 200 appearances for the club, including then teammates Stuart Dallas, Liam Cooper and Kalvin Phillips. On 18 March 2022, he scored a stoppage time winner against Wolverhampton Wanderers. On 8 May 2022, during a Premier League match against Arsenal, he was sent off for a two footed tackle on Gabriel Martinelli. Ayling was initially shown a yellow card, which was later upgraded to red by VAR.

Fitness and injuries limited Ayling's playing time during the pre-World Cup portion of the season. At the time of the Premier League break on 13 November 2022, he had made only seven league appearances, all bar one as a late substitute. He played the full 90 minutes in just two games in October and November in the league and the League Cup. On 16 February 2023, the club announced it had extended his contract by a year to the summer of 2024. On 13 May, he scored his first Premier League goal at Elland Road in a 2–2 draw against Newcastle, in his 250th appearance for the club in all competitions. He left Leeds at the end of the 2023–24 season, amassing a total of 268 appearances and 11 goals in his eight years with the club.

=== Middlesbrough ===
In January 2024, Ayling joined Championship club Middlesbrough on loan for the remainder of the 2023–24 season. He made 19 appearances and contributed eight assists during his loan spell. On 27 May 2024, it was confirmed that he would sign for Middlesbrough on a permanent deal; and subsequently, he signed a two-year contract. He scored his first goal for the club on 4 November 2025, a 96th-minute headed equaliser in a 1–1 draw at Leicester City.

== Style of play ==
Ayling plays as a right-back but can also play as a centre-back or as a defensive midfielder. Former Guardian sports writer Steve Claridge lauded Ayling for his "reading of the game, communications skills, organisation skills, aerial prowess, two footedness and use of the ball" in his scouting reports column.

== Personal life ==
In August 2019, Ayling was one of the main stars of the Leeds United documentary Take Us Home on Amazon Prime, featuring in several episodes. The documentary was narrated by Academy Award winning actor and Leeds fan Russell Crowe.

On 9 June 2021, he married his wife Poppy, with singer-songwriter Ellie Goulding performing at the ceremony. Ayling and his wife have two daughters, born in 2017 and 2023.

Ayling has the nickname "Bill", which was given to him during his time in Arsenal, when namesake Luke Freeman was in the squad; to avoid confusion involving their shared given name, Ayling adopted the nickname, by which he was also often referred to by Leeds players and fans when he played for the club.

He speaks with a stammer.

His uncle is Ray Lewington, and his cousin is Ray's son Dean Lewington.

== Career statistics ==
As of match played 31 October 2026

Appearances and goals by club, season and competition
Club	Season	League			FA Cup		League Cup		Other		Total	
Club	Season	Division	Apps	Goals	Apps	Goals	Apps	Goals	Apps	Goals	Apps	Goals
Arsenal	2009–10	Premier League	0	0	0	0	0	0	0	0	0	0
Yeovil Town (loan)	2009–10	League One	4	0	—		—		—		4	0
Yeovil Town	2010–11	League One	37	0	1	0	1	0	1 (Note: Appearance(s) in Football League Trophy)	0	40	0
Yeovil Town	2011–12	League One	44	0	3	0	1	0	0	0	48	0
Yeovil Town	2012–13	League One	39	0	0	0	2	0	6 (Note: Three appearances in Football League Trophy, three appearances in League One play-offs)	0	47	0
Yeovil Town	2013–14	Championship	42	2	2	0	2	1	—		46	3
Yeovil Town	Total		166	2	6	0	6	1	7	0	185	3
Bristol City	2014–15	League One	46	4	5	0	1	0	6	0	58	4
Bristol City	2015–16	Championship	33	0	2	0	1	0	—		36	0
Bristol City	2016–17	Championship	1	0	—		0	0	—		1	0
Bristol City	Total		80	4	7	0	2	0	6	0	95	4
Leeds United	2016–17	Championship	42	0	0	0	1	0	—		43	0
Leeds United	2017–18	Championship	27	0	0	0	4	0	—		31	0
Leeds United	2018–19	Championship	38	2	1	0	1	0	2 (Note: Appearances in Championship play-offs)	0	42	2
Leeds United	2019–20	Championship	37	4	1	0	0	0	—		38	4
Leeds United	2020–21	Premier League	38	0	0	0	0	0	—		38	0
Leeds United	2021–22	Premier League	26	2	1	0	1	0	—		28	2
Leeds United	2022–23	Premier League	29	2	2	0	1	0	—		32	2
Leeds United	2023–24	Championship	14	1	1	0	1	0	—		16	1
Leeds United	Total		251	11	6	0	9	0	2	0	268	11
Middlesbrough (loan)	2023–24	Championship	19	0	—		—		—		19	0
Middlesbrough	2024–25	Championship	26	0	0	0	2	0	—		28	0
Middlesbrough	2025–26	Championship	43	1	1	0	1	0	3	0	48	1
Middlesbrough	2026–27	Championship	11	0	0	0	3	0	0	0	14	0
Middlesbrough	Total		99	1	1	0	6	0	3	0	109	1
Career total			600	18	20	0	23	1	18	0	661	19

== Honours ==
Arsenal U18

- Premier Academy League: 2008–09
- FA Youth Cup: 2008–09

Yeovil Town

- Football League One play-offs: 2013

Bristol City

- Football League One: 2014–15
- Football League Trophy: 2014–15

Leeds United

- EFL Championship: 2019–20

Individual

- PFA Fans' Player of the Year: 2019–20 Championship
- PFA Team of the Year: 2019–20 Championship
- Leeds United Goal of the Season: 2019–20
