= Craig Eastmond =

English footballer (born 1990)

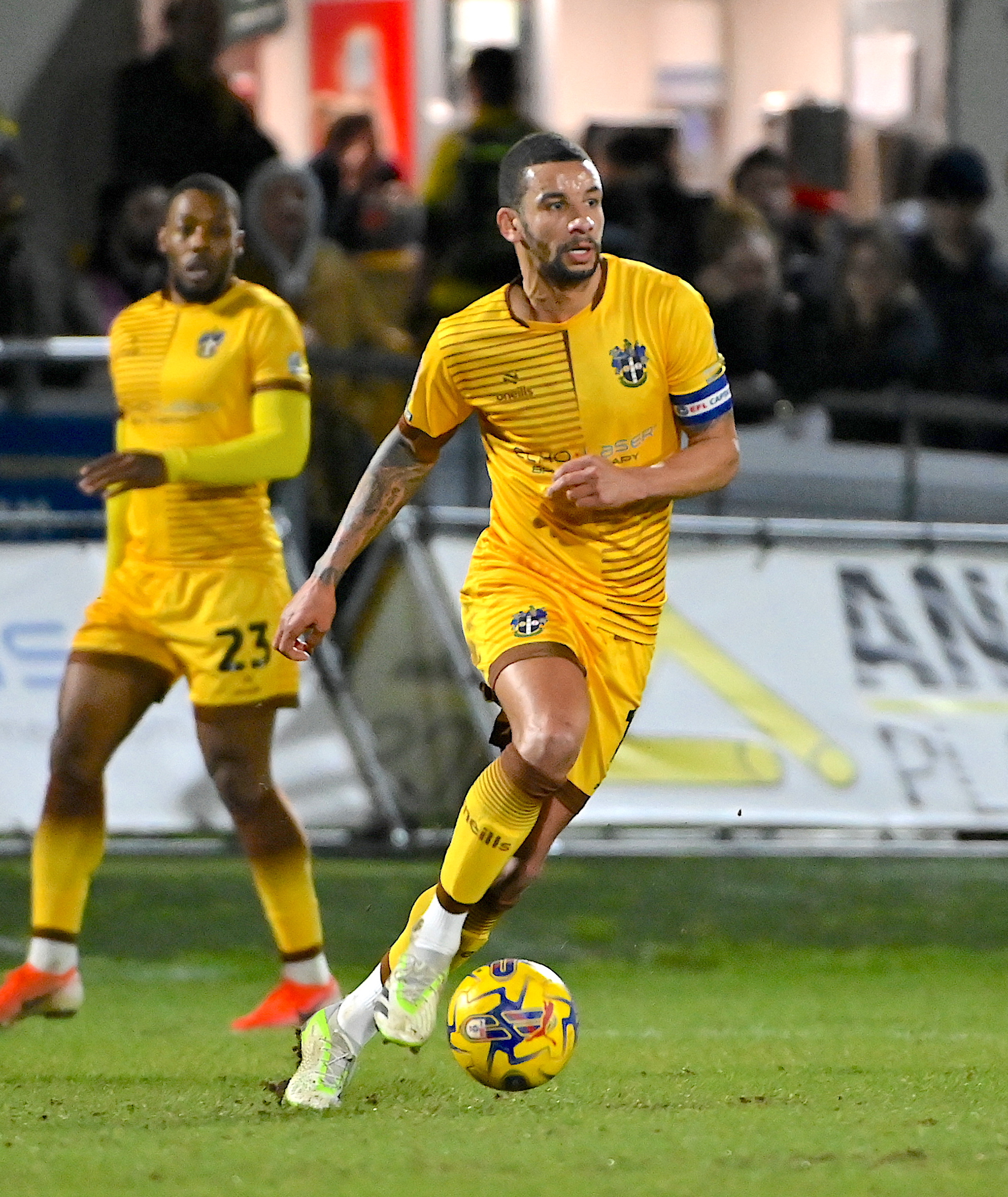
- Eastmond playing for Sutton United in 2024

Personal information
- Full name: Craig Leon Eastmond
- Date of birth: 9 December 1990 (age 35)
- Place of birth: Battersea, England
- Height: 1.83 m (6 ft 0 in)
- Positions: Midfielder; right-back

Team information
- Current team: Eastbourne Borough
- Number: 15

Youth career
- 2000–2002: Millwall
- 2002–2009: Arsenal

Senior career*
Years	Team	Apps	(Gls)
2009–2013	Arsenal	4	(0)
2011	→ Millwall (loan)	6	(0)
2012	→ Wycombe Wanderers (loan)	14	(0)
2012	→ Colchester United (loan)	12	(2)
2013–2015	Colchester United	49	(5)
2015	Yeovil Town	1	(0)
2015–2024	Sutton United	297	(26)
2024–2025	Wealdstone	12	(0)
2025–	Eastbourne Borough	48	(0)
- * Club domestic league appearances and goals as of 22:52, 21 November 2026 (UTC)

Craig Leon Eastmond (born 9 December 1990) is an English professional footballer who plays as a midfielder for Isthmian League Premier Division club Eastbourne Borough. He is also capable of playing at right-back. A product of the Arsenal Academy who came to prominence during the 2008–09 FA Youth Cup, Eastmond made ten first team appearances between 2009 and 2013 for Arsenal in the Premier League, FA Cup, League Cup and UEFA Champions League.

Eastmond had three loan spells away from the Gunners. He joined Millwall on loan in 2011, with whom he spent some of his early youth career. He was loaned to Wycombe Wanderers and Colchester United in 2012, and signed for Colchester on a permanent basis in 2013 following the expiry of his contract with Arsenal. He made over 50 appearances for Colchester before his release in February 2015.

As a player at Sutton United, in 2016–17 Eastmond was part of only the 9th non-League side to reach the 5th round of the FA Cup since 1945, and in 2020–21 was captain as the club won the National League and promotion to the English Football League for the first time in its 123-year history.

== Club career ==
=== Arsenal ===
Eastmond started his career at Millwall at the age of eight, but joined Arsenal when he was 11 years old. Although previously a right-back, when playing for the Arsenal Reserves, he was played in a central midfield position. He was a member of the team that won the 2008–09 FA Youth Cup and the 2008–09 Premier Academy League. On 30 June 2009, it was announced that Eastmond along with three other members of the double-winning youth squad had signed professional terms with the club.

Eastmond made his first-team debut on 28 October 2009 in the League Cup against Liverpool, helping set up Arsenal's first goal in a 2–1 victory. He made his Premier League debut against Portsmouth, coming on as an 85th-minute substitute for Samir Nasri in a 4–1 win at Fratton Park on 30 December 2009.

After signing a new long-term contract extension with the club on 13 January 2010, Eastmond was handed his first Premier League start away to Bolton Wanderers on 17 January, starting alongside Cesc Fàbregas and Abou Diaby as the Gunners ran out 2–0 winners, before being replaced by Fran Mérida after 62 minutes. He made his FA Cup debut one week later in a 3–1 defeat to Stoke City, playing some of the game at right-back following Francis Coquelin's substitution. Eastmond ended his first season as a professional with seven first-team appearances to his name, including two League Cup games, four Premier League matches and an FA Cup appearance.

During the 2010–11 season, he was handed his European debut away to Shakhtar Donetsk on 3 November, scoring an own goal in the first half and being replaced by Carlos Vela after 59 minutes in the 2–1 defeat. His appearance against Wigan Athletic in the League Cup on 30 November 2010 would prove to be his last for Arsenal when he came on as a second-half substitute for Robin van Persie.

==== Millwall loan ====
Eastmond made a return to his first club Millwall on 25 January 2011, almost ten years after he left the club as a youth. Having failed to establish himself in the Arsenal first-team, he joined the Championship side on loan until the end of the 2010–11 season. He made his debut in a 2–0 home victory against Barnsley on 28 January, playing 70 minutes before being substituted.

Eastmond struggled to break into Kenny Jackett's promotion-chasing side, making just four starts and two substitute appearances from January to April. However, his season ended prematurely after he broke his ankle during a Millwall training session, as he returned to his parent club for treatment.

==== Wycombe Wanderers loan ====
Following his injury lay-off, Eastmond returned to first-team action with a loan spell at League One club Wycombe Wanderers on 21 February 2012, signing on loan until the end of the season. He made his debut on 25 February in a 5–0 win against Hartlepool United at Adams Park. Despite Wycombe being relegated from League One at the end of the 2011–12 season, Eastmond was ever-present for Gary Waddock's team following his arrival, playing 14 games.

==== Colchester United loan ====
After being linked with a loan move to Colchester United, on 27 September 2012, Eastmond was signed on a three-month loan deal by Joe Dunne on the day he was appointed Colchester manager, joining alongside fellow Arsenal player Sanchez Watt and MK Dons striker Jabo Ibehre. Eastmond's debut against Hartlepool on 29 September got off to a bad start when his mistake allowed Craig Lynch to score the Hartlepool's opener after just six minutes. However, his side recovered to record a 3–1 victory.

Eastmond scored two goals during his loan period with Colchester, the first a close range one-two with Sanchez Watt in a 2–0 victory over Carlisle United on 20 October, and his second one-week later when the U's relinquished a two-goal cushion in a 2–2 away draw with Shrewsbury Town. After featuring 13 times for the club, Eastmond fractured his fifth metatarsal in training in December 2012, forcing him to return to his parent club and look set to keep him out of action for two months.

=== Colchester United ===
With his contract set to expire in the summer of 2013, Arsenal announced on 20 May 2013 that Eastmond would sign for Colchester United, the club where he was loaned during the 2012–13 season, penning a two-year deal with the U's. However, before he could play a competitive game for Colchester, he was injured in his first game of pre-season on 10 July. He was substituted after just 36 minutes of play during a friendly match at Heybridge Swifts following a strong challenge from Ryan Doyle. Despite his injury, he had returned to action in late July, featuring for 30 minutes in a friendly against Ipswich Town, and 45 minutes in a 1–0 win over non-league Histon.

He made his full debut for the club on 3 August 2013 in Colchester's 1–0 opening day win against Gillingham. He scored his first goal of the campaign during a 3–1 home victory over Milton Keynes Dons on 26 November with an effort that went in off the post. Eastmond helped Colchester to their biggest win under Joe Dunne's stewardship with a 4–0 victory over Stevenage on 26 December, registering two goals for himself in the process. Eastmond was one of the more regular appearance-makers in the Colchester United first-team during the 2013–14 season, in a season where he eventually made 42 appearances. He scored his fourth goal in the final game of the season in a 1–0 win against Walsall with a freak goal. Saddlers defender James Chambers' attempted clearance struck Eastmond and flew into the net to earn the U's the win.

Eastmond started for Colchester in their opening day fixture with Oldham Athletic at the Colchester Community Stadium on 9 August, but limped off after just 32 minutes with an ankle injury, ruling him out of a League Cup clash with Charlton Athletic three days later. He returned as a late substitute in the U's 2–1 reverse at the hands of Notts County on 19 August, and also appeared as a substitute in the 1–0 loss to Doncaster Rovers on 23 August. He was then left out of Colchester's game with Peterborough United by manager Joe Dunne, with Dunne stating that he had given the player time off. However, on 1 September, Joe Dunne was replaced as Colchester manager by Tony Humes, with Humes announcing that Eastmond had "taken part in every [training] session with us this week" and that he looked "quite sharp". In Humes' first match in charge, Eastmond was amongst the matchday squad, but was an unused substitute in the U's 0–0 stalemate with Walsall on 6 September. He appeared as a substitute for Sanchez Watt and played for 15 minutes in the next match, a 2–0 away victory against Leyton Orient on 13 September. Eastmond started only his second match of the season on 20 September when the U's held Bradford City to a 0–0 home draw. He scored his first and only goal of the campaign on 20 December with the only goal in an away victory over Yeovil Town, slotting home after an assist by George Moncur.

After finding his chances limited under Tony Humes, Eastmond was released from the club by mutual consent on 2 February 2015. He made 13 appearances in the 2014–15 season and 55 appearances in total excluding his time on loan with the U's.

=== Yeovil Town ===
On 17 February 2015, Eastmond joined League One side Yeovil Town until the end of the season Eastmond was released at the end of his contract having made just one appearance for Yeovil.

=== Sutton United ===
On 9 September 2015, following his release from Yeovil Town, Eastmond signed for National League South side Sutton United. He made his debut in a 1–0 home victory against Gosport Borough on 12 September and scored his first goal for his new club in a 3–1 away victory over Bath City on 17 October. He went on to make 31 league appearances for the season and scored three goals, helping the team win the National League South title and promotion to the National League. He won the Club Player of the Year and Players' Player of the Year awards and was included in the National League South team of the season.

Following a series of impressive performances in the National League and FA Cup, Sutton supporters voted Eastmond player of the month for November 2016. Eastmond appeared in every round of Sutton's historic run to the fifth round of the FA Cup for the first time ever, including appearances in a 3–1 victory against local rivals AFC Wimbledon of League One on 17 January 2017, a 1–0 victory over Championship side Leeds United on 29 January and a 0–2 defeat to his former club Arsenal on 20 February.

In his third season at the club, Eastmond was named in the 2017–18 National League Team of the Season for his "impressive consistency", having helped Sutton to achieve a best ever league finish of third in England's fifth tier.

With Sutton sitting at the top of the National League and by now club captain, Eastmond won the league's Player of the Month award for February 2021. In March he made his 250th appearance for Sutton United. In the penultimate match of the season, Eastmond led Sutton as they beat Hartlepool United 3–0 to move five points clear of Torquay United and secure the title, winning promotion to the Football League for the first time in their history. He won the Club Player of the Year award for a second time.

In February 2022, Eastmond was inducted into the Sutton United Hall of Fame.

At the end of the 2023–24 season, the club announced that following relegation, Eastmond would depart the club upon the expiration of his contract.

=== Wealdstone ===
On 2 July 2024, Eastmond joined National League side Wealdstone on a one-year deal with the option for a further season.

=== Eastbourne Borough ===
On 16 June 2025, Eastmond joined National League South side Eastbourne Borough, and was announced as the new club captain.

== Personal life ==
Born in Battersea, London, Eastmond is of Bajan descent. He has five older brothers, two of whom were professional footballers. His oldest brother, Darren, was signed to Wimbledon and another brother, Gavin, was also signed to Millwall. His cousin Kyle Eastmond is a professional rugby union and former professional rugby league footballer who has represented England at full international level.

== Career statistics ==
As of 21 November 2026

Appearances and goals by club, season and competition
Club	Season	League			FA Cup		League Cup		Other		Total	
Club	Season	Division	Apps	Goals	Apps	Goals	Apps	Goals	Apps	Goals	Apps	Goals
Arsenal	2009–10	Premier League	4	0	1	0	2	0	0	0	7	0
Arsenal	2010–11	Premier League	0	0	0	0	2	0	1 (Note: Appearance(s) in UEFA Champions League)	0	3	0
Arsenal	2011–12	Premier League	0	0	0	0	0	0	0	0	0	0
Arsenal	2012–13	Premier League	0	0	—		0	0	0	0	0	0
Arsenal	Total		4	0	1	0	4	0	1	0	10	0
Millwall (loan)	2010–11	Championship	6	0	—		—		—		6	0
Wycombe Wanderers (loan)	2011–12	League One	14	0	—		—		—		14	0
Colchester United (loan)	2012–13	League One	12	2	1	0	—		—		13	2
Colchester United	2013–14	League One	39	4	1	0	1	0	1 (Note: Appearance(s) in Football League Trophy)	0	42	4
Colchester United	2014–15	League One	10	1	2	0	0	0	1	0	13	1
Colchester United	Total		61	7	4	0	1	0	2	0	68	7
Yeovil Town	2014–15	League One	1	0	—		—		—		1	0
Sutton United	2015–16	National League South	31	3	4	0	—		7 (Note: 6 appearances in FA Trophy, 1 appearance in Surrey Senior Cup)	0	42	3
Sutton United	2016–17	National League	37	0	7	0	—		3 (Note: Appearance(s) in FA Trophy)	0	47	0
Sutton United	2017–18	National League	36	5	1	0	—		4 (Note: Three appearances in FA Trophy, one appearance in National League play-offs)	0	41	5
Sutton United	2018–19	National League	39	7	3	0	—		4 (Note: Two appearances in FA Trophy, two appearances in Scottish Challenge Cup)	0	46	7
Sutton United	2019–20	National League	24	1	2	0	—		0	0	26	1
Sutton United	2020–21	National League	41	5	0	0	—		3	0	44	5
Sutton United	2021–22	League Two	31	1	1	0	1	0	6 (Note: Appearance(s) in EFL Trophy)	2	39	3
Sutton United	2022–23	League Two	35	2	1	0	1	0	4	0	41	2
Sutton United	2023–24	League Two	23	2	1	0	2	0	0	0	26	2
Sutton United	Total		297	26	20	0	4	0	31	2	352	28
Wealdstone	2024–25	National League	12	0	1	0	—		1 (Note: Appearance(s) in National League Cup)	0	14	0
Eastbourne Borough	2025–26	National League South	37	0	1	0	—		2 (Note: Appearance(s) in Sussex Senior Cup)	0	40	0
Eastbourne Borough	2026–27	IL Premier Division	11	0	3	0	—		1	0	15	0
Eastbourne Borough	Total		48	0	4	0	—		3	0	55	0
Career total			443	33	30	0	9	0	38	2	520	35

== Honours ==
Arsenal

- Premier Academy League: 2009
- FA Youth Cup: 2009

Sutton United

- National League: 2020–21
- National League South: 2015–16
- EFL Trophy runner-up: 2021–22

Individual

- Sutton United Player of the Year: 2015–16
- Sutton United Players Player of the Year: 2015–16
- National League South Team of the Year: 2015–16
- National League Team of the Year: 2017–18
- National League Player of the Month: February 2021
- Sutton United: Player of the Season: 2022–23
