= Jay Emmanuel-Thomas =

English footballer (born 1990)

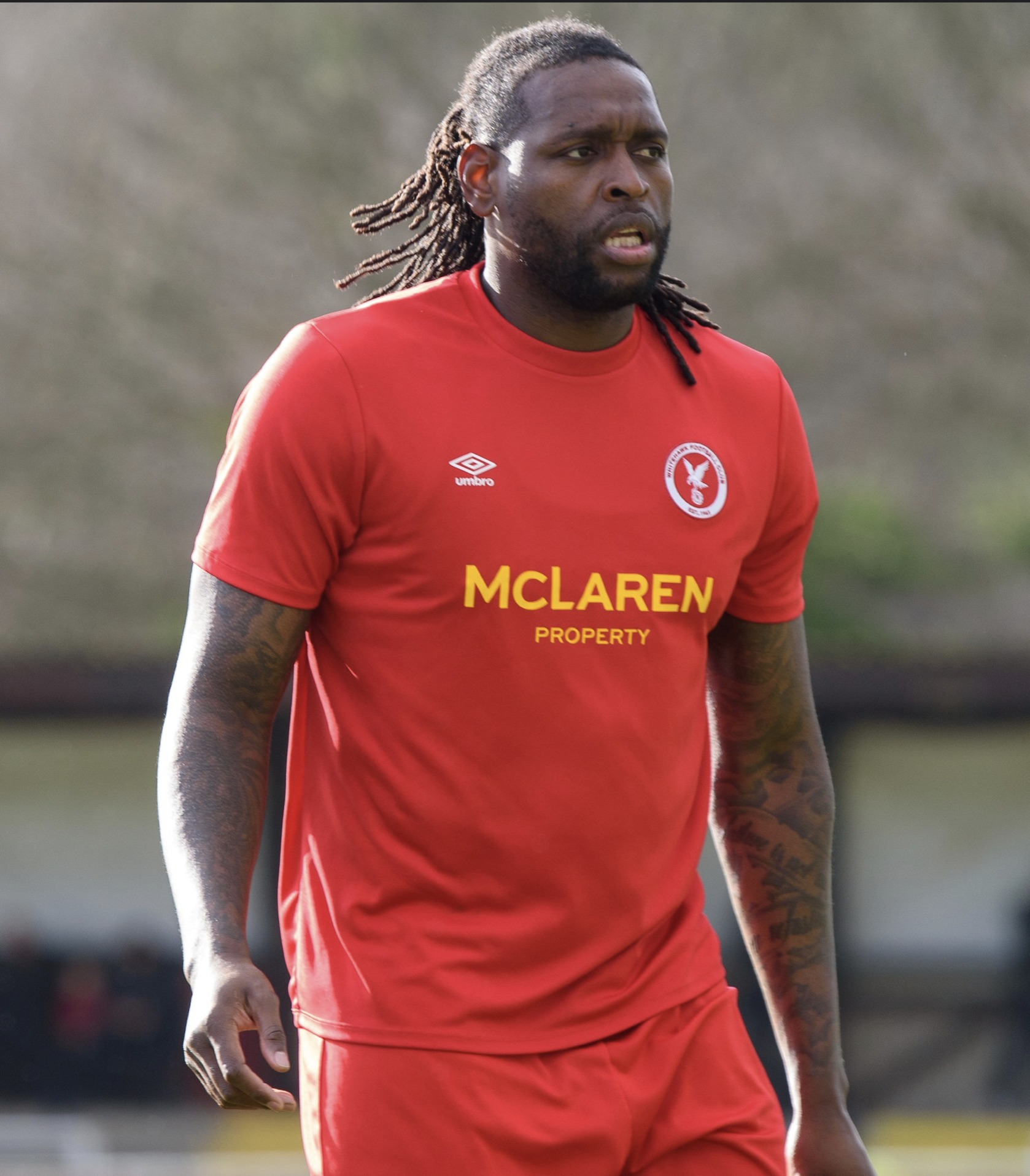
- Emmanuel-Thomas playing for Whitehawk in 2026

Personal information
- Full name: Jay Aston Emmanuel-Thomas
- Date of birth: 27 December 1990 (age 35)
- Place of birth: Forest Gate, London, England
- Positions: Striker; winger

Team information
- Current team: Whitehawk

Youth career
- 1998–2008: Arsenal

Senior career*
Years	Team	Apps	(Gls)
2008–2011	Arsenal	1	(0)
2009	→ Blackpool (loan)	11	(1)
2010	→ Doncaster Rovers (loan)	14	(5)
2011	→ Cardiff City (loan)	14	(2)
2011–2013	Ipswich Town	71	(8)
2013–2015	Bristol City	82	(24)
2015–2018	Queens Park Rangers	12	(3)
2016	→ Milton Keynes Dons (loan)	4	(0)
2016–2017	→ Gillingham (loan)	28	(7)
2019	PTT Rayong	11	(1)
2020–2021	Livingston	24	(5)
2021–2022	Aberdeen	15	(0)
2022–2023	Jamshedpur	17	(2)
2024	Kidderminster Harriers	9	(0)
2024	Greenock Morton	5	(0)
2025	AFC Totton	4	(0)
2025–2026	Braintree Town	10	(1)
2026–	Whitehawk	9	(2)

International career
2007–2008	England U17	5	(0)
2008–2009	England U19	2	(0)
- * Club domestic league appearances and goals as of 10:23, 27 March 2026 (UTC)

Jay Aston Emmanuel-Thomas (born 27 December 1990) is an English professional footballer who currently plays for Isthmian League Premier Division club Whitehawk. A product of the Arsenal Academy, he is a versatile forward and can play as a winger or striker.

Emmanuel-Thomas began his career with Arsenal of the Premier League and, although he won trophies with the youth team and played regularly for the reserves, he was unable to secure a regular place in the first team and was sent out on loan to several lower-division clubs. In 2011 he left Arsenal to join Ipswich Town of the Football League Championship. He subsequently played for Bristol City and had a two-year spell at Queens Park Rangers, during which he was again loaned out. In 2019 he joined PTT Rayong in Thailand but the following year moved to Scottish club Livingston. He joined another Scottish club, Aberdeen in 2021 before moving to India to play for Jamshedpur.

In 2025 Emmanuel-Thomas pleaded guilty to orchestrating the attempted importation of drugs into Britain, and was dismissed by Scottish club Greenock Morton while awaiting sentencing. In June of that year he was sentenced to four years in prison. He resumed his career in non-League with AFC Totton upon being released on parole.

== Club career ==
=== Arsenal ===
Born in London to a St. Lucian mother and a Dominican father, Emmanuel-Thomas is a midfielder who has also played as left-back, left winger and centre-forward. He was at Arsenal from the age of eight, when he was spotted playing for his father's team by a "Gunners" scout, who invited him for dinner. He became captain of the under-18 youth team when he was just 16 years old. In the summer of 2008 he signed his first professional contract with the club.

==== 2008–09 season ====
On 6 August 2008, Emmanuel-Thomas played in Arsenal's pre-season friendly 2–1 win over Huddersfield Town at the Galpharm Stadium. Three days later he played for the first team in their 1–1 draw with Spanish La Liga side Sevilla in the pre-season Amsterdam Tournament at the Amsterdam Arena. In the 2008–09 season he made 39 appearances for both the youth and reserve teams, scoring seven goals. He captained the youth team as they were crowned Premier Academy League champions. They were first in Group A and after beating Group C winners Manchester City 2–1 in the semi-finals, they beat club rivals Tottenham Hotspur 1–0 in the play-off final on 17 May 2009 at White Hart Lane.

He also played a big part in the youth team winning the 2008–09 FA Youth Cup, in which he scored in every round. Arsenal beat Liverpool 6–2 on aggregate in the two-legged final, with Emmanuel-Thomas captaining the side and also scoring in the 4–1 first leg win at the Emirates Stadium. He thus attained the Youth Premiership and FA Cup double together with the rest of the club's youth team that year.

He also formed part of the squad in first team matches during the 2008–09 season on two occasions. Firstly, on 23 September 2008 in Arsenal's 6–0 League Cup victory over Sheffield United and secondly in Arsenal's 3–0 Premier League victory over Portsmouth on 2 May 2009.

==== 2009–10 season ====
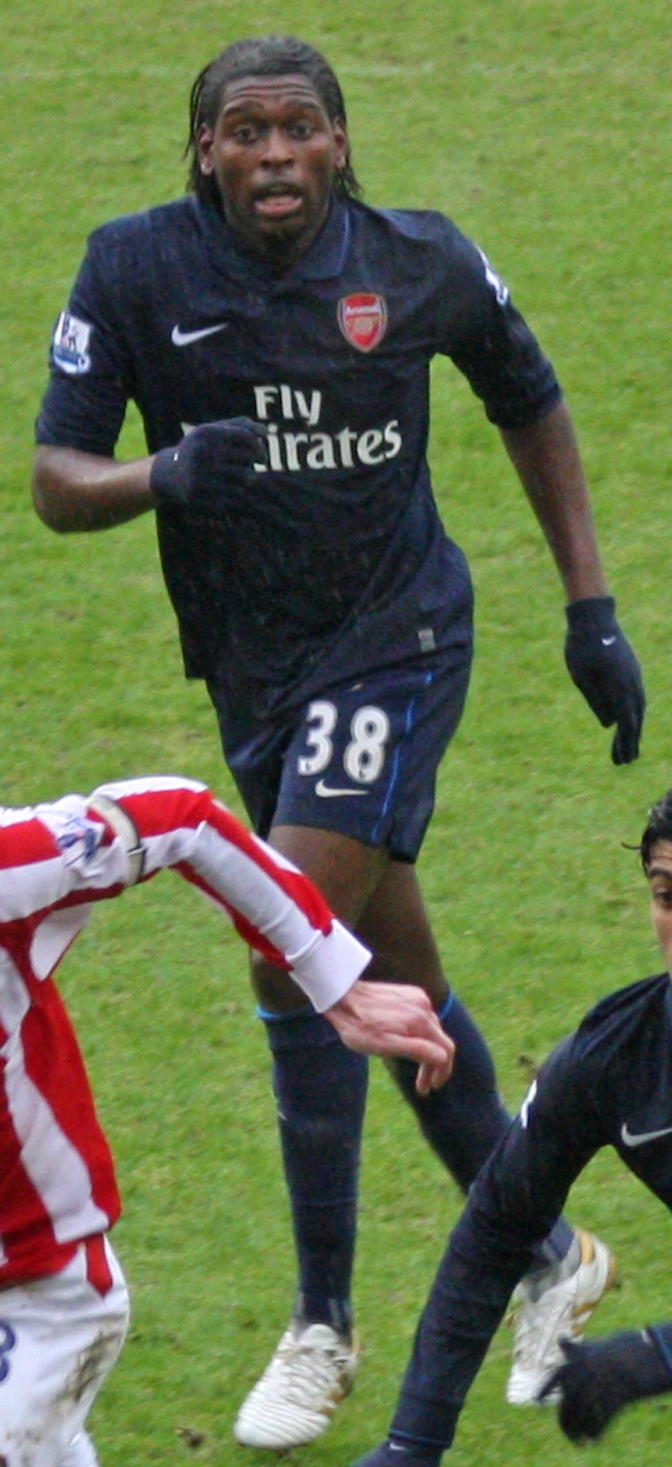
Emmanuel-Thomas playing for Arsenal in 2010

Emmanuel-Thomas was an unused substitute for the Premier League games against Burnley on 16 December and Hull City three days later as well as Everton on 9 January 2010. On 18 December he signed a new long-term contract. He scored a hat-trick for the reserves in their 4–2 Premier Reserve League South win over West Ham United at Upton Park on 12 January 2010. He made his Arsenal debut when he started the 4th round FA Cup tie against Stoke on 24 January 2010. Playing as a striker in a 3-man attack, he was substituted after 66 minutes.

==== Blackpool (loan) ====
After attending Blackpool's first home game of the 2009–10 season, he signed a one-month loan deal with the club. Blackpool manager Ian Holloway said, "I am delighted to have Jay. He is a fantastic young lad, he has a great physique and he wants the chance to come out and play. Initially it is just a month but I hope to convince him we can build on that and extend it for a longer period." The following day he made his professional debut as a 57th-minute substitute, replacing David Vaughan in a 0–0 home draw with Derby County.

Talking about his debut, Emmanuel-Thomas said, "It was great and I enjoyed it. I've come to Blackpool to prove that I can play against men who are older and perhaps stronger than me, and that I can handle myself without any problems. Hopefully it will be good for me and will help me." He then scored on his full debut on 21 August in a 2–2 draw with Watford at Vicarage Road, when his powerful header in the 56th minute went past Hornets goalkeeper Scott Loach.

On 18 September, after five appearances, his loan spell with the Tangerines was extended by a further two months. He scored his second goal for the Seasiders on 31 October in a 3–3 draw with Doncaster Rovers at the Keepmoat Stadium. On 3 November, with his three-month loan spell ending after the home clash with Scunthorpe United the following Saturday, it was revealed that Ian Holloway hoped to re-sign Emmanuel-Thomas on a half-season loan in January 2010.

==== Doncaster Rovers (loan) ====
On 27 February 2010, he signed a one-month loan deal with Doncaster Rovers. He made his debut with the team the same day as substitute of James Hayter at the 76-minute. Emmanual-Thomas started the next game away against Bristol City and scored twice as Doncaster won the game 5–2. His loan was later extended till the end of the 2009–10 season.

==== 2010–11 season ====
Emmanuel-Thomas started the season in great form for the reserves, scoring 10 in 9 appearances. He made his first league appearance for the senior team against Chelsea on 3 October coming on for Jack Wilshere in the 81st minute. Manager Arsène Wenger was effusive in his praise for Emmanuel-Thomas stating, "When his fitness is right, Jay will be not only a good player but a great player". He scored a goal using the "hocus pocus" skill to get past two defenders and shoot past the goalkeeper in a reserve match against Everton and fuelled speculation that he should be playing at a far higher level.

==== Cardiff City (loan) ====
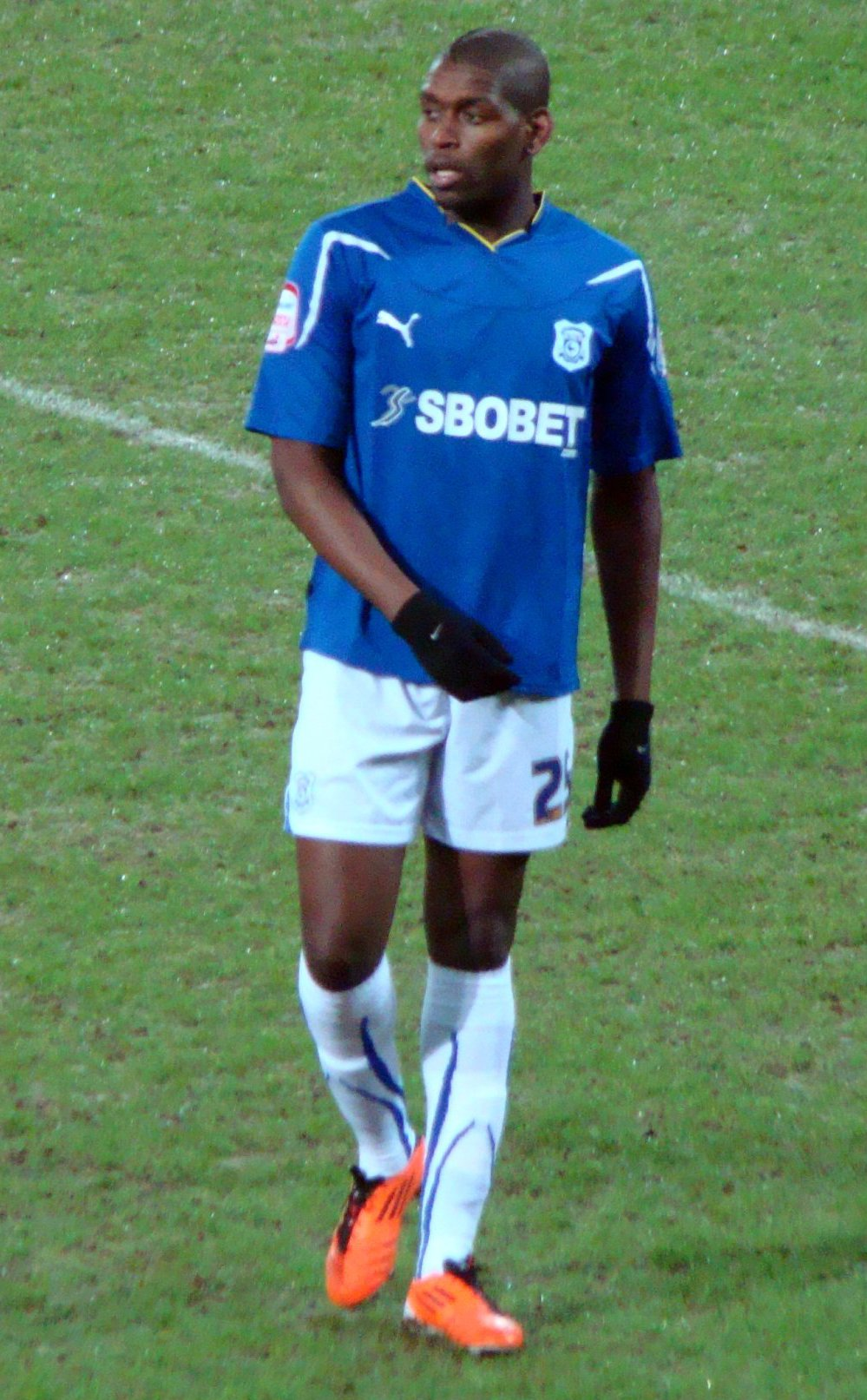
Emmanuel-Thomas playing for Cardiff City in 2011

On 18 January 2011, Emmanuel-Thomas announced on his Twitter page that he had signed for Cardiff City on loan until the end of the season. Toward the end of his loan spell he was drafted out of the match day 18 in order to facilitate Jason Koumas among the substitutes.

=== Ipswich Town ===
==== 2011–12 season ====
On 26 July 2011, Emmanuel-Thomas signed for Championship club Ipswich Town for an undisclosed fee. He scored his first goal for Ipswich in a 2–1 League Cup defeat to Northampton Town on 9 August 2011. His first league goal proved only to be a consolation as Ipswich were beaten 5–2 by Southampton on 16 August. Despite notching his first goal for the club, it was clear that Emmanuel-Thomas was still someway from his best, and was only showing glimpses of the trickery he had displayed in the Arsenal reserves. However, as the season moved into 2012, he really began to show the sort of form Ipswich fans had expected of him, despite the fact that the team were experiencing a poor run of form. After a number of long range efforts that had stung various keepers' fingertips and rattled the woodwork, Emmanuel-Thomas picked up his second and third goals for Town, as they pulled out one of the most surprising results of the season by hammering league leaders West Ham United 5–1.

==== 2012–13 season ====
Emmanuel-Thomas scored his fourth goal for Ipswich on 4 February scoring his first away goal against Coventry City.

=== Bristol City ===
==== 2013–14 season ====
On 8 July 2013, Emmanuel-Thomas signed for Bristol City on a two-year contract in a straight player-swap deal with winger Paul Anderson moving to Ipswich. On 3 August 2013, Emmanuel-Thomas scored on his debut for Bristol City. He scored his first professional hat trick on 26 October against Carlisle United to take his tally to ten goals for the season. Emmanuel-Thomas finished the season with 21 goals. His strike partner Sam Baldock had scored 26 goals, meaning the two were the third best strike partnership in England with 47 goals between them in the 2013–14 season.

==== 2014–15 season ====
To start the 2014–15 season, Emmanuel-Thomas was used sparingly as new signings Kieran Agard and Aaron Wilbraham flourished in attack for City. Bristol City started the season with a 22-game unbeaten run, propelling them to the top of League One and setting a new club record. Emmanuel-Thomas's first goal of the season came in a 2–1 away victory against Notts County on 31 August 2014. He then went 11 league games without scoring a goal, but finally broke his duck against Yeovil Town in a 2–1 home win on Boxing Day. After injuries to both Agard and Wilbraham, Emmanuel-Thomas shone in attack alongside loan signing Matt Smith, including setting up Smith for two of his four goals against Gillingham in the Football League Trophy Southern Area Final. Emmanuel-Thomas scored both goals as Bristol City beat Doncaster Rovers in an FA Cup 3rd round replay at Ashton Gate, before scoring in back-to-back games against Scunthorpe United and Fleetwood Town. On 10 February 2015, he scored a 25-yard strike in City's 3–1 home win against Port Vale, taking his tally of league goals to seven for the season and extending City's lead at the top of League One to four points, with a game in hand over second-placed Swindon Town.

=== Queens Park Rangers ===
On 12 June 2015, it was announced that Emmanuel-Thomas would join Queens Park Rangers on a free transfer when his contract at Bristol City expired in the summer. Thomas made his competitive QPR debut in the first game of the 2015–16 Championship season which resulted in a 2–0 defeat against Charlton Athletic, he came on as a substitute replacing Tjaronn Chery in the 71st minute. He scored his first goal for QPR in a Football League Cup match against Yeovil Town as they secured a 3–0 victory. On 3 October 2015, Emmanuel-Thomas scored his first league goals for Queens Park Rangers, in a double which helped his side to a 4–3 win over Bolton Wanderers.

Emmanuel-Thomas left the club at the end of the 2017–18 season.

==== Milton Keynes Dons (loan) ====
On 1 February 2016, Emmanuel-Thomas joined Championship rivals Milton Keynes Dons on loan for the remainder of the 2015–16 campaign.

==== Gillingham (loan) ====
On 5 August 2016, Emmanuel-Thomas joined League One side Gillingham on a season-long loan for the 2016–17 campaign. He scored on his debut in a 3–1 win over Southend United on 6 August 2016. He then scored twice more when Gillingham played Southend again three days later in the EFL Cup. He scored 10 goals from 35 appearances for Gillingham before returning to QPR, cutting his loan short in February 2017.

=== PTT Rayong ===
In January 2019 Emmanuel-Thomas joined PTT Rayong, in Thailand.

=== Livingston ===
On 30 September 2020, Emmanuel-Thomas joined Scottish Premiership club Livingston on a one-year deal with an option of a second year. He featured as a substitute in the February 2021 Scottish League Cup Final which saw Livingston lose 1–0 to St Johnstone.

=== Aberdeen ===
On 18 May 2021, it was announced that Emmanuel-Thomas would join fellow Scottish Premiership side Aberdeen on a two-year deal after his contract with Livingston expired. He scored his first and what turned out to be only goal for the club on 15 August 2021 in a Scottish League Cup tie against Raith Rovers. On 12 April 2022, Emmanuel-Thomas had his contract terminated by the club.

=== Jamshedpur ===
On 12 August 2022, Emmanuel-Thomas joined the Indian club Jamshedpur FC as one of their designated overseas players for the 2022–23 Indian Super League season. He was allocated the number 10 jersey.

He left the club in June 2023.

=== Kidderminster Harriers ===
Following an unsuccessful trial with Scottish side Inverness Caledonian Thistle in October 2023, Emmanuel-Thomas returned to England with National League club Kidderminster Harriers on 23 February 2024.

=== Greenock Morton ===
After being released by Kidderminster, Emmanuel-Thomas trained with Scottish side Greenock Morton in July 2024, and subsequently signed a six-month contract with the club. His contract was terminated on 19 September 2024, after he appeared in court charged with the attempted importation of class B drugs.

=== AFC Totton ===
In July 2025, after being released on parole, Emmanuel-Thomas signed for AFC Totton.

=== Braintree Town ===
He moved from Totton to National League side Braintree Town in November 2025, scoring on his debut against Truro City.

On 11 February 2026, it was announced that Emmanuel-Thomas had left the club following the termination of his contract.

=== Whitehawk ===
Later in February 2026 he joined Brighton based Isthmian League Premier Division Whitehawk.

== International career ==
Emmanuel-Thomas has played for the England under-17 team. In December 2009, he was part of the under-19 squad that qualified for the Elite qualifying round of the 2009 UEFA European Under-19 Championship.

Emmanuel-Thomas was eligible to play for West Indies nations Saint Lucia and Dominica.

== Criminal conviction ==
On 18 September 2024, Emmanuel-Thomas was arrested at his home in Gourock, charged with orchestrating the attempted importation of drugs. He was taken to Carlisle for questioning and was set to appear before Carlisle Magistrates, accused of being responsible for importing 60 kg of cannabis, worth an estimated £600,000, which was found in suitcases arriving at Stansted Airport from Bangkok carried by his girlfriend and a friend of hers, who had been duped into transporting what they were informed was gold. He was dismissed by his football club.

On 24 October 2024, he appeared at Chelmsford Crown Court and denied any involvement in the smuggling of drugs from Thailand. He was remanded in custody until trial in May 2025, at which stage he pleaded guilty, to be sentenced later. On 5 June, he was sentenced to four years in prison. He was released from prison on parole in July 2025.

== Career statistics ==
As of match played 20 April 2024

Appearances and goals by club, season and competition
Club	Season	League			National cup (Note: Includes FA Cup, Thai FA Cup, Scottish Cup, Super Cup)		League cup (Note: Includes Football League Cup, Scottish League Cup)		Continental		Other		Total	
Club	Season	Division	Apps	Goals	Apps	Goals	Apps	Goals	Apps	Goals	Apps	Goals	Apps	Goals
Arsenal	2009–10	Premier League	0	0	1	0	0	0	0	0	—		1	0
Arsenal	2010–11	Premier League	1	0	0	0	2	0	1 (Note: Appearance in UEFA Champions League)	0	—		4	0
Arsenal	Total		1	0	1	0	2	0	1	0	0	0	5	0
Blackpool (loan)	2009–10	Championship	11	1	0	0	1	0	—		0	0	12	1
Doncaster Rovers (loan)	2009–10	Championship	14	5	0	0	0	0	—		—		14	5
Cardiff City (loan)	2010–11	Championship	14	2	0	0	0	0	—		2 (Note: Appearances in Championship play-offs)	0	16	2
Ipswich Town	2011–12	Championship	42	6	1	0	1	1	—		—		44	7
Ipswich Town	2012–13	Championship	29	2	1	0	2	0	—		—		32	2
Ipswich Town	Total		71	8	2	0	3	1	0	0	0	0	76	9
Bristol City	2013–14	League One	46	15	4	4	3	1	—		2 (Note: Appearances in Football League Trophy)	1	55	21
Bristol City	2014–15	League One	36	9	5	3	1	0	—		6	0	48	12
Bristol City	Total		82	24	9	7	4	1	0	0	8	1	103	33
Queens Park Rangers	2015–16	Championship	12	3	1	0	2	2	—		—		15	5
Queens Park Rangers	2016–17	Championship	0	0	0	0	0	0	—		—		0	0
Queens Park Rangers	2017–18	Championship	0	0	0	0	0	0	—		—		0	0
Queens Park Rangers	Total		12	3	1	0	2	2	0	0	0	0	15	5
Milton Keynes Dons (loan)	2015–16	Championship	4	0	0	0	0	0	—		—		4	0
Gillingham (loan)	2016–17	League One	28	7	2	0	3	2	—		2 (Note: Appearances in EFL Trophy)	1	35	10
PTT Rayong	2019	Thai League 1	11	1	1	0	—		—		—		12	1
Livingston	2020–21	Scottish Premiership	24	5	2	2	5	2	—		—		31	9
Aberdeen	2021–22	Scottish Premiership	15	0	2	0	1	1	6 (Note: Appearances in UEFA Europa Conference League)	0	—		24	1
Jamshedpur	2022–23	Indian Super League	17	2	4	0	—		—		1 (Note: Appearance in Indian Super League play-offs for AFC Champions League)	0	22	2
Kidderminster Harriers	2023–24	National League	9	0	0	0	—		—		0	0	9	0
Greenock Morton	2024–25	Scottish Championship	5	0	0	0	—		—		1 (Note: Appearances in Scottish League Challenge Cup)	0	6	0
Career total			318	58	24	9	21	9	7	0	14	2	384	78

== Honours ==
Arsenal Youth

- FA Youth Cup: 2008–09
- Premier Academy League: 2008–09

Bristol City

- Football League One: 2014–15
- Football League Trophy: 2014–15

Livingston

- Scottish League Cup runner-up: 2020–21

Individual

- PFA League One Player of the Month: January 2015
