= Conor Henderson =

Irish footballer

Personal information
- Full name: Conor Alan Henderson
- Date of birth: 8 September 1991 (age 35)
- Place of birth: Sidcup, England
- Height: 1.85 m (6 ft 1 in)
- Position: Midfielder

Youth career
- 1999–2010: Arsenal

Senior career*
Years	Team	Apps	(Gls)
2010–2013	Arsenal	0	(0)
2012	→ Coventry City (loan)	2	(0)
2013–2014	Hull City	0	(0)
2014	→ Stevenage (loan)	3	(0)
2014–2016	Crawley Town	20	(2)
2015	→ Grimsby Town (loan)	0	(0)
2016	Grimsby Town	3	(0)
2016–2017	Crawley Town	12	(0)
2017	Eastbourne Borough	1	(0)
2017–2018	Pirin Blagoevgrad	24	(3)
2019	Dunărea Călărași	11	(0)
2019–2022	Pirin Blagoevgrad	41	(3)

International career
2007	England U17	3	(0)
2008–2010	Republic of Ireland U19	6	(2)
2011–2012	Republic of Ireland U21	3	(1)
- * Club domestic league appearances and goals as of 4 February 2022 (UTC)

Conor Alan Henderson (born 8 September 1991) is a professional footballer who plays as a midfielder.

Henderson came through the youth academy at Arsenal, signing professional terms in 2010. He went on to play in the Football League for Coventry City, Hull City, Stevenage, Crawley Town and Grimsby Town, as well as a stint with non-league Eastbourne Borough. Between 2017 and 2022 he played his football in Bulgaria and Romania with spells at Pirin Blagoevgrad and Dunărea Călărași.

Born in England, he was capped by England U17 but switched allegiance to play for Republic of Ireland U19 and U21.

== Career ==
=== Arsenal ===
A product of the Arsenal Academy, Henderson came to prominence during the Gunners' 2008–09 FA Youth Cup, 2008–09 Premier Academy League and 2009–10 Premier Academy League wins.

Henderson was named on the bench for the away trips to Wigan and Blackburn near the end of the 2009–10 season but did not make an appearance. On 2 March 2011, it was announced that he would make his debut against Leyton Orient in an FA Cup replay. He played the full 90 minutes as Arsenal won 5–0. Arsène Wenger later stated after the match that he expects Henderson to be a future player for the first team. During pre-season, he damaged his knee ligaments. Arsène Wenger later said that he would be out for a minimum of six months. In March 2012 he played his first game in eight months in a behind-closed-doors match against Reading.

In September 2012, Henderson went on a three-month loan to Coventry City, making his debut in a 2–1 home defeat to Carlisle United. However, Henderson's loan spell at Coventry City was marred by a spell on the substitution bench and injuries. After making two appearances, Henderson returned to his parent club on 23 December 2012.

Henderson was released by Arsenal after the end of the 2012–13 season, after failing to agree a new deal with the club.

=== Hull City ===
After impressing manager Steve Bruce during two reserve matches, Henderson was signed by Hull City on 24 September 2013 on a free transfer and was given the number 30 shirt. Henderson made his debut against Huddersfield Town in the third round of the Football League Cup and came on in the 74th minute, replacing fellow Irish midfielder Stephen Quinn in a 1–0 win for the Tigers.

On 27 March 2014, Henderson went out on loan to Stevenage for the rest of the season. After featuring on the bench four times, Henderson made his debut for the club on 12 April 2014, where he made his first start, as Stevenage lose 3–2 to Colchester United. Henderson added two more appearances for Stevenage. Stevenage were relegated to League Two and he returned to Hull City.

At the end of the 2013–14 season, Henderson was released by the club upon the expiry of the contract.

=== Crawley Town ===
After being released by Hull City, Henderson joined Crawley Town for free on a one-year contract. Henderson made his debut in the opening game of the season, where he set up the only goal in the game as Crawley Town beat Barnsley 1–0. Henderson scored his first goal for the club on 21 October 2014, in a 1–0 win over Walsall. However, Henderson was placed on the transfer list by Manager John Gregory after being on the bench. Nevertheless, Henderson remained in the first team, until an ankle injury in the 2–2 draw against Milton Keynes Dons kept him out for the remainder of the season. Having spoke to new manager Mark Yates in June 2015, Henderson agreed to a new six-month contract with the club.

=== Grimsby Town ===
On 25 November 2015, Henderson joined National League side Grimsby Town, on loan until January 2016. Having previously spending a week on trial at Scottish Premiership side Inverness Caledonian Thistle.

Following his release by Crawley, Henderson signed a deal until the end of the 2015–16 season. He was part of the team that eventually beat Forest Green Rovers 3–1 in the 2016 National League play-off final at Wembley, seeing Grimsby promoted to League Two after a six-year absence from the Football League. Henderson was released when his contract expired at the end of the season.

=== Return to Crawley Town ===
On 1 November 2016, Henderson re-joined Crawley Town on a short-term deal. Henderson made his return for Crawley, in a FA Cup replay at Bristol Rovers on 16 November as an emergency left back. The game resulted in a 4–2 defeat for the Reds, with Henderson conceding a penalty in extra time. On 17 January 2017, Henderson extended his contract with Crawley until the end of the 2016–17 campaign.

On 30 May 2017, it was announced that Henderson would leave Crawley upon the expiry of his contract in June 2017.

=== Eastbourne Borough ===
Following his release from Crawley, Henderson joined National League South side Eastbourne Borough.

=== Bulgaria and Romania ===
On 14 August 2017, following a successful trial period, Henderson signed a one-year contract with Bulgarian club Pirin Blagoevgrad. At the end of the season his team was relegated to Second League and he left.

On 10 January 2019, he joined Romanian Liga I side Dunărea Călărași on an 18-month deal. His team was relegated at the end of the season.

On 13 August 2019, Henderson re-joined Pirin.

== International career ==
He represented England at youth level but then switched to Republic of Ireland and has represented them at U-19 level. In March 2011 made his debut appearance for the Irish national Under-21 team. On 10 September 2012, Conor scored for the U21s, in a 4–2 win over Italy.

== Club statistics ==
As of matches played on 14 May 2021

Appearances and goals by club, season and competition
Club	Season	League			National Cup		League Cup		Other		Total	
Club	Season	Division	Apps	Goals	Apps	Goals	Apps	Goals	Apps	Goals	Apps	Goals
Arsenal	2010–11	Premier League	0	0	1	0	0	0	0	0	1	0
Arsenal	2011–12	Premier League	0	0	0	0	0	0	0	0	0	0
Arsenal	2012–13	Premier League	0	0	0	0	0	0	0	0	0	0
Arsenal	Total		0	0	1	0	0	0	0	0	1	0
Coventry City (loan)	2012–13	League One	2	0	0	0	0	0	—		2	0
Hull City	2013–14	Premier League	0	0	0	0	1	0	—		1	0
Stevenage (loan)	2013–14	League One	3	0	0	0	0	0	—		3	0
Crawley Town	2014–15	League One	17	2	0	0	2	0	—		19	2
Crawley Town	2015–16	League Two	3	0	0	0	0	0	0	0	3	0
Crawley Town	Total		20	2	0	0	2	0	0	0	22	2
Grimsby Town	2015–16	National League	3	0	0	0	—		5 (Note: Appearance(s) in FA Trophy)	1	8	1
Crawley Town	2016–17	League Two	12	0	1	0	0	0	1 (Note: Appearance(s) in EFL Trophy)	0	14	0
Eastbourne Borough	2017–18	National League South	1	0	0	0	—		0	0	1	0
Pirin Blagoevgrad	2017–18	First League	24	3	0	0	—		—		24	3
FC Dunărea Călărași	2018–19	Liga I	11	0	1	0	—		—		12	0
Pirin Blagoevgrad	2019–20	Second League	13	2	1	0	—		—		14	2
Pirin Blagoevgrad	2020–21	Second League	23	1	1	0	—		—		24	1
Career total			112	8	4	0	3	0	6	1	126	9

== Honours ==
Arsenal

- Premier Academy League: 2008–09, 2009–10
- FA Youth Cup: 2008–09
