= 2008–09 Premier Reserve League =

Football league season

- Champions: Aston Villa Reserves (1st title)
- Goals: 511
- Average goals/game: 2.79
- Top goalscorer: (Italy) Federico Macheda (9)
- Biggest home win: Chelsea Reserves 6–0 Portsmouth Reserves (16 February 2009)
- Biggest away win: Bolton Wanderers Reserves 1–5 Manchester City Reserves (17 March 2009); Hull City Reserves 1–5 Blackburn Rovers Reserves (22 October 2008)
- Highest scoring: Wigan Athletic Reserves 4–5 Manchester United Reserves (18 February 2009)
- Longest winning run: 5 games – Sunderland Reserves (8 October–19 November 2008)
- Longest unbeaten run: 10 games – Fulham Reserves (25 November 2008–14 April 2009)
- Longest losing run: 8 games – Stoke City Reserves (9 March–28 April 2009)
- Highest attendance: 3,955 – Liverpool Reserves v Manchester United Reserves (12 March 2009)
- Lowest attendance: 80 – Wigan Athletic Reserves v Bolton Wanderers Reserves (16 December 2008)

The 2008–09 Premier Reserve League (officially known as the 2008–09 Barclays Premier Reserve League for sponsorship reasons) is the tenth season since the establishment of the Premier Reserve League. The season began on 1 September 2008, and ended with the play-off final on 21 May 2009.

The events in the senior leagues during the 2007–08 season saw Birmingham City, Derby County and Reading all relegated and replaced by the promoted teams Hull City, Stoke City, and West Bromwich Albion.

Sunderland won Premier Reserve League North title after beating Manchester City 3–0 on 14 April 2009. Aston Villa sealed the Premier Reserve League South title for a second successive season with a 2–0 win over West Bromwich Albion on 27 April.

On 21 May, Aston Villa were crowned the 2008–09 Premier Reserve League Champions after a 3–1 win against Sunderland in the Play-off Final at Villa Park. It is Aston Villa Reserves' first national title.

== Tables ==
=== Premier Reserve League North ===
| Pos | Club | Pld | W | D | L | F | A | GD | Pts |
|---|---|---|---|---|---|---|---|---|---|
| 1 | Sunderland Reserves (C) | 20 | 13 | 4 | 3 | 33 | 13 | +20 | 43 |
| 2 | Manchester United Reserves | 20 | 10 | 6 | 4 | 35 | 19 | +16 | 36 |
| 3 | Blackburn Rovers Reserves | 20 | 9 | 6 | 5 | 30 | 19 | +11 | 33 |
| 4 | Newcastle United Reserves | 20 | 9 | 5 | 6 | 34 | 30 | 4 | 32 |
| 5 | Manchester City Reserves | 20 | 10 | 0 | 10 | 32 | 29 | +3 | 30 |
| 6 | Wigan Athletic Reserves | 20 | 8 | 3 | 10 | 25 | 36 | −11 | 24 |
| 7 | Liverpool Reserves | 20 | 5 | 7 | 8 | 26 | 26 | 0 | 22 |
| 8 | Everton Reserves | 20 | 5 | 7 | 8 | 19 | 25 | −6 | 22 |
| 9 | Hull City Reserves | 20 | 6 | 4 | 9 | 22 | 36 | −14 | 22 |
| 10 | Middlesbrough Reserves | 20 | 6 | 3 | 11 | 26 | 33 | −7 | 21 |
| 11 | Bolton Wanderers Reserves | 20 | 6 | 3 | 11 | 22 | 38 | −16 | 21 |

=== Premier Reserve League South ===
| Pos | Club | Pld | W | D | L | F | A | GD | Pts |
|---|---|---|---|---|---|---|---|---|---|
| 1 | Aston Villa Reserves (C) | 16 | 11 | 3 | 2 | 29 | 13 | +16 | 36 |
| 2 | Tottenham Hotspur Reserves | 16 | 10 | 1 | 5 | 26 | 19 | +7 | 31 |
| 3 | Fulham Reserves | 16 | 7 | 5 | 4 | 28 | 20 | +8 | 26 |
| 4 | Portsmouth Reserves | 16 | 8 | 1 | 7 | 18 | 25 | −7 | 25 |
| 5 | West Ham United Reserves | 16 | 7 | 1 | 8 | 19 | 26 | −7 | 22 |
| 6 | Arsenal Reserves | 16 | 5 | 3 | 7 | 17 | 22 | −5 | 19 |
| 7 | Chelsea Reserves | 16 | 5 | 3 | 8 | 28 | 26 | +2 | 18 |
| 8 | Stoke City Reserves | 16 | 4 | 2 | 10 | 18 | 23 | −5 | 14 |
| 9 | West Bromwich Albion Reserves | 16 | 4 | 2 | 10 | 20 | 29 | −9 | 14 |

Rules for classification: 1st points; 2nd goal difference; 3rd goals scored
Pos = Position; Pld = Matches played; W = Matches won; D = Matches drawn; L = Matches lost; F = Goals for; A = Goals against; GD = Goal difference; Pts = Points; C = Champions

== Play-off Final ==
21 May 2009
19:00 BST

| Aston Villa Reserves | 3–1 | Sunderland Reserves |
|---|---|---|
| Nathan Delfouneso 25'; James Collins 58'; Shane Lowry 87' | Report | Martyn Waghorn 28' |

Villa Park, Birmingham
Attendance: 5,337
Referee: Mark Clattenburg (Tyne and Wear)

== Top scorers ==
=== Premier Reserve League North ===
| Rank | Player | Team | Goals |
|---|---|---|---|
| 1 | (Italy) Federico Macheda | Manchester United | 9 |
| 2 | (England) Tom Craddock | Middlesbrough | 7 |
| 2 | (England) Mark Doninger | Newcastle United | 7 |
| 2 | (England) Nile Ranger | Newcastle United | 7 |
| 5 | (England) David Ball | Manchester City | 6 |
| 5 | (Poland) Tomasz Cywka | Wigan Athletic | 6 |
| 5 | (England) David Dowson | Sunderland | 6 |
| 8 | (England) Andy Carroll | Newcastle United | 5 |
| 8 | (Republic of Ireland) Alan Judge | Blackburn Rovers | 5 |
| 8 | (England) Paul Marshall | Manchester City | 5 |
| 8 | (England) James Vaughan | Everton | 5 |
| 8 | (Chile) Carlos Villanueva | Blackburn Rovers | 5 |

=== Premier Reserve League South ===
| Rank | Player | Team | Goals |
|---|---|---|---|
| 1 | (England) Tom Kilbey | Portsmouth | 5 |
| 1 | (England) Freddie Sears | West Ham United | 5 |
| 3 | (Jamaica) Giles Barnes | Fulham | 4 |
| 3 | (Italy) Fabio Borini | Chelsea | 4 |
| 3 | (England) Wayne Brown | Fulham | 4 |
| 3 | (England) Nathan Delfouneso | Aston Villa | 4 |
| 3 | (England) Lateef Elford-Alliyu | West Bromwich Albion | 4 |
| 3 | (England) Jonathan Hogg | Aston Villa | 4 |
| 3 | (England) Mark Randall | Arsenal | 4 |
| 3 | (Morocco) Adel Taarabt | Tottenham Hotspur | 4 |
| 3 | (Nigeria) Michael Uwezu | Fulham | 4 |

== Promotion and relegation ==
- Teams relegated from the Premier Reserve League at the end of this season:
  - West Bromwich Albion Reserves (South)
  - Middlesbrough Reserves (North)
  - Newcastle United Reserves (North)
- Teams promoted to the Premier Reserve League next season:
  - Wolverhampton Wanderers Reserves (South)
  - Birmingham City Reserves (South)
  - Burnley Reserves (North)

== See also ==
- Premier Academy League 2008–09
- FA Youth Cup 2008–09
- Premier League 2008–09
- 2008–09 in English football

=== Match reports ===
| Premier Reserve League North | Premier Reserve League South |
|---|---|
| Blackburn Rovers | Bolton Wanderers | Everton; Hull City | Liverpool | Manchester City | Manchester United; Middlesbrough | Newcastle United | Sunderland | Wigan Athletic | Arsenal | Aston Villa | Chelsea; Fulham | Portsmouth | Stoke City; Tottenham Hotspur | West Brom | West Ham United |
