= 2008–09 FA Youth Cup =

Tournament details
- Teams: 474

Final positions
- Champions: Arsenal (7th Title)
- Runners-up: Liverpool (3rd Runner Up Finish)

The 2008–09 FA Youth Cup was the 57th FA Youth Cup. A record 474 clubs participated in the competition. The competition started in September 2008 with the preliminary round and concluded with the final on 22 and 26 May 2009.

Arsenal knocked out holders Manchester City en route to the final, where they beat 2006 and 2007 winners Liverpool 6–2 on aggregate to lift the FA Youth Cup for the 7th time.

== Calendar ==
Qualifying ties played in the week commencing; proper ties played by the closing date.

Round	Date	Fixture(s)	Clubs	New entries
Preliminary Round	8 September 2008	119	474 → 355	238
First Round Qualifying	15 September 2008	132	355 → 223	145
Second Round Qualifying	6 October 2008	66	223 → 157	
Third Round Qualifying	20 October 2008	33	157 → 124	
First Round	11 November 2008	40	124 → 84	47
Second Round	26 November 2008	20	84 → 64	
Third Round	15 December 2008	32	64 → 32	44
Fourth Round	20 January 2009	16	32 → 16	
Fifth Round	7 March 2009	8	16 → 8	
Sixth Round	16 March 2009	4	8 → 4	
Semi-finals	First leg: 16 April 2009; Second leg: 22 April 2009	2	4 → 2	
Final	First leg: 22 May 2009; Second leg: 26 May 2009	1	2 → 1	

== First round ==
The League One and League Two teams will enter at this round except Notts County which did not apply, along with the winners of the previous round.

Tie no	Home team	Score	Away team	Attendance
1	Grimsby Town	0–1	Lincoln City	
2	Bradford City	1–0	Scunthorpe United	172
3	Rochdale	1–0	Huddersfield Town	302
4	Hartlepool United	1–4	Carlisle United	116
5	Bury	0–2	Crewe Alexandra	237
6	Worksop Town	0–3	Rotherham United	91
7	Darlington	2 – 3(aet)	Tranmere Rovers	210
8	Nantwich Town	5–0	Curzon Ashton	157
9	York City	2–3	Stockport County	155
10	Chester City	0–2	Leeds United	247
11	Macclesfield Town	4–1	Morecambe	89
12	Accrington Stanley	3–1	Wakefield	275
13	Fleetwood Town	0–3	Oldham Athletic	120
14	Shrewsbury Town	2–0	Chesterfield	110
15	Leicester City	2–1	Port Vale	330
16	Coventry Sphinx	2–3	Milton Keynes Dons	196
17	Solihull Moors	2–0	FCV Reds	95
18	Oadby Town	2–1	Hinckley United	110
19	Mansfield Town	3–2	Peterborough United	124
20	Rushden & Diamonds	1–2	Northampton Town	215

Tie no	Home team	Score	Away team	Attendance
21	Walsall	5–3	Hednesford Town	299
22	Millwall	2–0	Luton Town	
23	Gillingham	3–0	Eastbourne Borough	425
24	Brighton & Hove Albion	5–1	Dover Athletic	88
25	Southend United	3 – 3(8–9p)	Brentford	252
26	Stevenage Borough	2–3	Thurrock	122
27	Banbury United	1–2	Dagenham & Redbridge	203
28	Cambridge United	4–1	Colchester United	171
29	Lewes	2–0	Histon	187
30	Boreham Wood	0–5	Leyton Orient	151
31	Hayes & Yeading United	1–2	Croydon Athletic	96
32	Burgess Hill Town	0–2	Wycombe Wanderers	205
33	Basingstoke Town	0–2	Barnet	172
34	Aldershot Town	1–4	Havant & Waterlooville	169
35	Didcot Town	2 – 2(1–4p)	Cirencester Town	126
36	Cheltenham Town	5–1	Newport County	232
37	AFC Bournemouth	0–1	Bristol Rovers	
38	Swindon Town	4–1	Eastleigh	229
39	Yeovil Town	4–1	Hereford United	147
40	Woking	1 – 2(aet)	Exeter City	147

== Second round ==
The winners from the first round matches will progress to second round.

Tie no	Home team	Score	Away team	Attendance
1	Accrington Stanley	0–3	Carlisle United	245
2	Oldham Athletic	2–0	Rotherham United	152
3	Walsall	4 – 3(aet)	Rochdale	155
4	Solihull Moors	0–2	Tranmere Rovers	167
5	Nantwich Town	2–1	Macclesfield Town	478
6	Stockport County	3 – 3(2–4p)	Crewe Alexandra	236
7	Lincoln City	3–1	Mansfield Town	105
8	Shrewsbury Town	2–0	Bradford City	135
9	Oadby Town	0–3	Leeds United	521
10	Leicester City	3–1	Milton Keynes Dons	292

Tie no	Home team	Score	Away team	Attendance
11	Swindon Town	3–0	Exeter City	175 or 350
12	Yeovil Town	1–2	Cirencester Town	144
13	Cambridge United	0–2	Northampton Town	252
14	Lewes	3–0	Croydon Athletic	195
15	Barnet	3–1	Havant & Waterlooville	92
16	Brentford	6–2	Thurrock	253
17	Bristol Rovers	3–1	Brighton & Hove Albion	140
18	Millwall	5–1	Dagenham & Redbridge	372
19	Cheltenham Town	0–1	Gillingham	240
20	Wycombe Wanderers	1–2	Leyton Orient	215

== Third round ==
The 20 Premier League and 24 Championship teams enter at this stage, along with the winners of the second round.

Tie no	Home team	Score	Away team	Attendance
1	Swansea City	0–3	Manchester City	945
2	Brentford	1–2	Middlesbrough	356
3	Manchester United	2–3	Chelsea	1,246
4	Cardiff City	3–0	Blackpool	325
5	Swindon Town	1–5	Crystal Palace	388
6	Reading	0–1	Preston North End	303
7	Tottenham Hotspur	3–0	Sheffield United	2,662
8	Portsmouth	2–1	Gillingham	166
9	Leyton Orient	0–4	Watford	328
10	Barnsley	2–3	Walsall	130
11	Norwich City	1–0	Wigan Athletic	405
12	Sunderland	2–1	Cirencester Town	253
13	Leeds United	1–2	Liverpool	908
14	Carlisle United	1–3	Crewe Alexandra	267
15	Sheffield Wednesday	1–3	Millwall	329
16	Coventry City	2 – 3(aet)	Stoke City	335

Tie no	Home team	Score	Away team	Attendance
17	Ipswich Town	1–0	Shrewsbury Town	411
18	Bolton Wanderers	2–0	Doncaster Rovers	876
19	Burnley	3–1	West Bromwich Albion	470
20	Northampton Town	0–3	Tranmere Rovers	212
21	Aston Villa	2–3	Arsenal	1,060
22	Southampton	3 – 1(aet)	Derby County	327
23	Barnet	1–2	Bristol Rovers	72
24	Plymouth Argyle	2–1	Fulham	355
25	Newcastle United	2–1	Oldham Athletic	1,171
26	Lewes	1–2	Hull City	529
27	Queens Park Rangers	5 – 3(aet)	Bristol City	239
28	Everton	2–0	Nantwich Town	798
29	Birmingham City	2 – 1(aet)	Lincoln City	136
30	Leicester City	2–3	Wolverhampton Wanderers	448
31	Charlton Athletic	2 – 1(aet)	Blackburn Rovers	807
32	Nottingham Forest	3–1	West Ham United	472

== Fourth round ==
Tie no	Home team	Score	Away team	Attendance
1	Ipswich Town	4 – 2(aet)	Crystal Palace	413
2	Arsenal	3–1	Wolverhampton Wanderers	712
3	Preston North End	0 – 1(aet)	Sunderland	565
4	Chelsea	5–1	Walsall	217
5	Queens Park Rangers	1–3	Newcastle United	517
6	Norwich City	1 – 1(4–2p)	Stoke City	817
7	Southampton	0–1	Watford	586
8	Plymouth Argyle	3–2	Millwall	443
9	Bristol Rovers	2 – 2(2–4p)	Liverpool	2,459
10	Bolton Wanderers	4–0	Hull City	947
11	Burnley	1–3	Everton	478
12	Middlesbrough	1–2	Nottingham Forest	686
13	Charlton Athletic	0–3	Tottenham Hotspur	968
14	Birmingham City	3–2	Crewe Alexandra	171
15	Portsmouth	0–1	Manchester City	276
16	Cardiff City	0 – 0(5–4p)	Tranmere Rovers	485

== Fifth round ==
Tie no	Home team	Score	Away team	Attendance
1	Ipswich Town	2 – 3(aet)	Watford	1,823
2	Liverpool	1–0	Chelsea	2,193
3	Sunderland	0–4	Arsenal	1,207
4	Plymouth Argyle	0–3	Tottenham Hotspur	2,111
5	Everton	1 – 1(1–3p)	Norwich City	249
6	Manchester City	4–2	Newcastle United	905
7	Nottingham Forest	0–2	Bolton Wanderers	450
8	Cardiff City	0–2	Birmingham City	499

== Quarter-finals ==
Tie no	Home team	Score	Away team	Report	Attendance
1	Birmingham City	1–0	Watford	Report	2,404
2	Manchester City	1–0	Norwich City	Report	3,254
3	Tottenham Hotspur	1–3	Arsenal	Report	19,084
4	Liverpool	4–2	Bolton Wanderers	Report	2,676

== Semi-finals ==
=== First leg ===
18 March 2009
19:00 GMT

Manchester City	1–2	Arsenal
Nimely-Tchuimeni 41'	Report	Emmanuel-Thomas 71'; Sunu 82'

City of Manchester Stadium, Manchester
Attendance: 2,615
Referee: Andy Penn (West Midlands)

16 April 2009
19:00 BST

Birmingham City	0–3	Liverpool
	Report	Dalla Valle 12', 28'; Amoo 24'

St Andrew's, Birmingham
Attendance: 4,238
Referee: Mark Haywood (West Yorkshire)

=== Second leg ===
22 April 2009
19:00 BST

Arsenal	4–1	Manchester City
Watt 1', 31'; Wilshere 20' (pen.); Bartley 29'	Report	Benali 45'

Emirates Stadium, London
Attendance: 9,266
Referee: Keith Woolmer (Northamptonshire)

Arsenal won 6–2 on aggregate.

24 April 2009
19:45 BST

Liverpool	3–1	Birmingham City
Dalla Valle 17', 58'; Kačaniklić 53'	Report	Sammons 44'

Anfield, Liverpool
Attendance: 4,449
Referee: Clive W. Oliver (Northumberland)

Liverpool won 6–1 on aggregate.

== Final ==
=== First leg ===
22 May 2009
20:00 BST

Arsenal	4–1	Liverpool
Sunu 21'; Wilshere 35' (pen.); Watt 57'; Emmanuel-Thomas 66'	Report	Kačaniklić 37'

Emirates Stadium, London
Attendance: 33,662
Referee: Lee Mason (Lancashire)

Arsenal	Liverpool

ARSENAL:
1	(England) James Shea
2	(England) Craig Eastmond
3	(England) Thomas Cruise
4	(England) Kyle Bartley
5	(Ghana) Emmanuel Frimpong
6	(England) Luke Ayling
7	(England) Henri Lansbury
8	(France) Francis Coquelin
9	(Togo) Gilles Sunu
10	(England) Jack Wilshere
11	(England) Jay Emmanuel-Thomas (c)
Substitutes:
12	(Republic of Ireland) Rhys Murphy
13	(England) Charlie Mann
14	(England) Sanchez Watt
15	(Republic of Ireland) Conor Henderson
16	(Cameroon) Cedric Evina
Manager:
(England) Steve Bould

LIVERPOOL:
1	(Australia) Dean Bouzanis
2	(England) Karl Clair
3	(Germany) Christopher Buchtmann
4	(Spain) Daniel Ayala
5	(England) Joe Kennedy (c)
6	(England) Andre Wisdom
7	(England) David Amoo
8	(England) Steven Irwin
9	(Finland) Lauri Dalla Valle
10	(England) Tom Ince
11	(Sweden) Alexander Kačaniklić
Substitutes:
12	(England) Nathan Eccleston
13	(England) Deale Chamberlain
14	(England) Michael Roberts
15	(Scotland) Alex Cooper
16	(England) Jack Robinson
Manager:
(England) Hughie McAuley

=== Second leg ===
26 May 2009
19:45 BST

Liverpool	1–2	Arsenal
Dalla Valle 52'	Report	Watt 25'; Ayala 70' (o.g.)

Anfield, Liverpool
Attendance: 7,792
Referee: Lee Mason (Lancashire)

Liverpool	Arsenal

LIVERPOOL:
1	(Australia) Dean Bouzanis
2	(England) Steven Irwin
3	(England) Jack Robinson
4	(Spain) Daniel Ayala
5	(England) Joe Kennedy (c)
6	(England) Andre Wisdom
7	(England) David Amoo
8	(Germany) Christopher Buchtmann
9	(Finland) Lauri Dalla Valle
10	(England) Tom Ince
11	(Sweden) Alexander Kačaniklić
Substitutes:
12	(England) Nathan Eccleston
13	(England) Deale Chamberlain
14	(Scotland) Alex Cooper
15	(England) Michael Roberts
16	(England) Karl Clair
Manager:
(England) Hughie McAuley

ARSENAL:
1	(England) James Shea
2	(England) Craig Eastmond
3	(England) Thomas Cruise
4	(England) Kyle Bartley
5	(France) Francis Coquelin
6	(England) Luke Ayling
7	(England) Henri Lansbury
8	(England) Jack Wilshere
9	(Togo) Gilles Sunu
10	(England) Sanchez Watt
11	(England) Jay Emmanuel-Thomas (c)
Substitutes:
12	(Republic of Ireland) Rhys Murphy
13	(England) Charlie Mann
14	(Republic of Ireland) Conor Henderson
15	(Turkey) Oğuzhan Özyakup
16	(Cameroon) Cedric Evina
Manager:
(England) Steve Bould

Arsenal won 6–2 on aggregate.

== See also ==
- 2008–09 Premier Academy League
- 2008–09 Premier Reserve League
- 2008–09 FA Cup
- 2008–09 in English football
