= Rhys Murphy =

English footballer (born 1990)

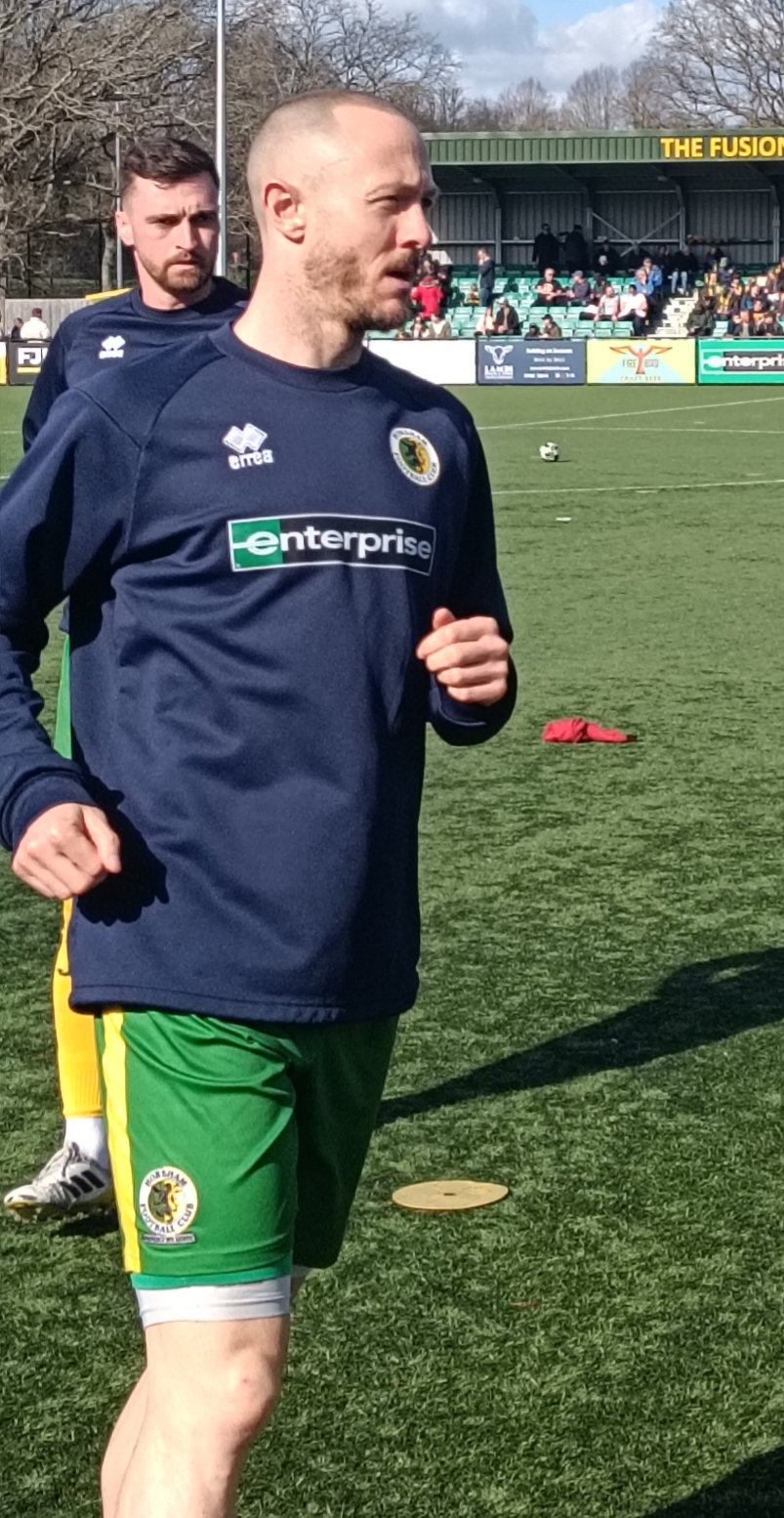
- Murphy warming up for Horsham in 2026

Personal information
- Full name: Rhys Philip Elliot Murphy
- Date of birth: 6 November 1990 (age 35)
- Place of birth: Shoreham-by-Sea, England
- Height: 6 ft 0 in (1.82 m)
- Position: Striker

Team information
- Current team: Whitehawk F.C.
- Number: 15

Youth career
- Wimbledon
- –2008: Arsenal

Senior career*
Years	Team	Apps	(Gls)
2008–2012	Arsenal	0	(0)
2009–2010	→ Brentford (loan)	5	(0)
2012	→ Preston North End (loan)	5	(0)
2012–2013	Telstar	28	(7)
2013–2015	Dagenham & Redbridge	41	(14)
2015–2016	Oldham Athletic	24	(3)
2015	→ Crawley Town (loan)	15	(9)
2016	→ AFC Wimbledon (loan)	7	(1)
2016–2018	Forest Green Rovers	17	(7)
2016–2017	→ York City (loan)	5	(0)
2017	→ Crawley Town (loan)	15	(1)
2017	→ Torquay United (loan)	8	(1)
2018	Gillingham	1	(0)
2018–2019	Chelmsford City	38	(25)
2019–2021	Yeovil Town	58	(29)
2021–2023	Southend United	32	(9)
2023–2024	Yeovil Town	25	(10)
2024–2025	Dorking Wanderers	18	(5)
2025–	Horsham	33	(5)
2026	→ Farnham Town (loan)	7	(1)
2026-	Whitehawk	12	(5)

International career
2005	Republic of Ireland U15	1	(0)
2005–2006	England U16	1	(1)
2006–2007	England U17	18	(9)
2007–2009	England U19	7	(3)
2011–2012	Republic of Ireland U21	3	(1)
- * Club domestic league appearances and goals as of 17:02 5 November 2026 (UTC)

Rhys Philip Elliot Murphy (born 6 November 1990) is a professional footballer who plays as a striker for Whitehawk.

He has played in the English Football League for Brentford, Preston North End, Dagenham & Redbridge, Oldham Athletic, Crawley Town, AFC Wimbledon, Forest Green Rovers and Gillingham.

Murphy represented his native England at under-16, under-17 and under-19 international levels, but switched allegiance to the Republic of Ireland in 2011 and played for their under-21 team.

== Club career ==
Murphy was born in Shoreham-by-Sea, West Sussex. He broke into the Arsenal reserve team as a schoolboy, while also scoring 17 goals in 21 matches for the Arsenal Academy. He was previously an academy player for Wimbledon before joining Arsenal Academy. He signed his first professional contract in July 2008. He won the 2008–09 Premier Academy League with the Arsenal under-18 team, scoring the only goal in the play-off final versus Tottenham Hotspur, and the 2008–09 FA Youth Cup. He joined League One club Brentford on loan for three months on 24 November 2009. In August 2011, Murphy had a trial with Scottish Premier League champions Rangers and played for their reserve team. In January 2012, he had a trial with Hibernian, another SPL club. He signed for League One club Preston North End on loan until the end of the 2011–12 season. On 22 May 2012, Murphy was released by Arsenal.

Murphy joined Eerste Divisie club Telstar on 9 June 2012, signing a one-year contract with an option for a second. He made his debut on 10 August 2012 in a 2–1 home defeat to Helmond Sport. In the 67th minute, he was substituted for Leandro Resida who scored three minutes after.

He signed for League Two club Dagenham & Redbridge on 22 July 2013 on a two-year contract. He scored on his debut in the 3–1 defeat away to Fleetwood Town on 3 August 2013. He then scored his second goal for Dagenham in a 2–0 home win against York City the following week.

On 2 February 2015, Murphy signed for League One club Oldham Athletic on a two-and-a-half-year contract for an undisclosed fee believed to be in the region of £20,000, to accelerate a pre-contract agreement set to activate in the 2015 summer transfer window. Manager Lee Johnson said of the arrival, "I'm really pleased to bring Rhys to the club and he is an exciting prospect for us, I'm looking forward to working with him and he will fit into our style of play seamlessly". He joined League Two club Crawley Town on 17 September 2015 on a 93-day loan.

On 7 July 2016, Murphy signed for National League club Forest Green Rovers for a nominal fee. His first goal for Forest Green came on 20 August 2016 in a 2–1 home win over York. He followed his first goal up by scoring twice in a 4–1 away victory over Maidstone United a week later on 27 August 2016. On 1 December 2016, Murphy joined Forest Green's divisional rivals York City on loan until 7 January 2017. On 31 January 2017, Murphy returned to League Two club Crawley Town on loan for the remainder of 2016–17. Five days later, Murphy made his Crawley return in a 2–1 home defeat against Stevenage, replacing Enzio Boldewijn with 12 minutes remaining. On 19 September 2017, Murphy joined National League side Torquay United on a three-month loan deal. He had his contract with Forest Green cancelled by mutual consent on 9 January 2018.

Murphy signed for League One club Gillingham on 31 January 2018 on a short-term contract.

Murphy signed for National League South club Chelmsford City on 11 July 2018. On 26 December 2018, Murphy scored his first hat-trick for the club in a 5–1 win against rivals Billericay Town. Murphy was released by Chelmsford at the end of the 2018–19 season, having been the club's top scorer with 28 goals in all competitions.

Murphy signed for newly relegated National League club Yeovil Town on 26 June 2019 on a two-year contract.

On 10 June 2021, after weeks of speculation, Murphy agreed a two-year deal to join recently relegated National League side Southend United, officially joining the club on 1 July 2021 upon the expiration of his Yeovil contract.

In June 2023, Yeovil Town announced that Murphy was rejoining the club following the expiry of his contract at Southend United on 1 July 2023.

In May 2024, Dorking Wanderers announced that Murphy would be joining the club following the expiry of his contract at Yeovil Town, after he rejected the offer of a new contract. On 14 May 2025, it was announced that Murphy would leave the club at the end of his contract in June.

On 5 July 2025, following his release from Dorking Wanderers, Murphy agreed to join newly promoted National League South side, Horsham. On 10 January 2026, Murphy scored 2 goals in a 3–2 victory over Leatherhead, helping Horsham to advance to the 5th round of the FA Trophy for the first time in the club's history. In March 2026, he joined Southern League Premier Division South club Farnham Town on loan for the remainder of the season.

Murphy made his debut for Isthmian League Premier side Whitehawk after joining at the start of the 2026–2027 season.

== International career ==
=== England ===
Murphy has played for the England under-16 and under-17 teams and was part of under-19 squad that reached the final of 2009 UEFA European Under-19 Championship.

=== Republic of Ireland ===
Before playing for England, Murphy represented the Republic of Ireland at under-15 level and after an approach from Irish under-21 Head Coach Noel King, he switched his allegiance back to the country of his grandfather. He was called up to the under-21 squad in August 2011, and made his debut on 1 September 2011 against Hungary at the Showgrounds, scoring the winner in a 2–1 victory.

== Career statistics ==
As of match played 8 August 2026

Appearances and goals by club, season and competition
Club	Season	League			National Cup (Note: Includes FA Cup, KNVB Cup)		League Cup (Note: Includes League Cup)		Other		Total	
Club	Season	Division	Apps	Goals	Apps	Goals	Apps	Goals	Apps	Goals	Apps	Goals
Arsenal	2009–10	Premier League	0	0	—		0	0	0	0	0	0
Arsenal	2010–11	Premier League	0	0	0	0	0	0	0	0	0	0
Arsenal	2011–12	Premier League	0	0	0	0	0	0	0	0	0	0
Arsenal	Total		0	0	0	0	0	0	0	0	0	0
Brentford (loan)	2009–10	League One	5	0	1	0	—		—		6	0
Preston North End (loan)	2011–12	League One	5	0	—		—		—		5	0
Telstar	2012–13	Eerste Divisie	28	7	2	0	—		—		30	7
Dagenham & Redbridge	2013–14	League Two	32	13	1	0	1	0	1 (Note: Appearance in Football League Trophy)	0	35	13
Dagenham & Redbridge	2014–15	League Two	9	1	2	0	0	0	0	0	11	1
Dagenham & Redbridge	Total		41	14	3	0	1	0	1	0	46	14
Oldham Athletic	2014–15	League One	11	0	—		—		—		11	0
Oldham Athletic	2015–16	League One	13	3	—		0	0	1	0	14	3
Oldham Athletic	Total		24	3	—		0	0	1	0	25	3
Crawley Town (loan)	2015–16	League Two	15	9	1	0	—		—		16	9
AFC Wimbledon (loan)	2015–16	League Two	7	1	—		—		0	0	7	1
Forest Green Rovers	2016–17	National League	17	7	0	0	—		0	0	17	7
Forest Green Rovers	2017–18	League Two	0	0	—		0	0	0	0	0	0
Forest Green Rovers	Total		17	7	0	0	0	0	0	0	17	7
York City (loan)	2016–17	National League	5	0	—		—		1 (Note: Appearance(s) in FA Trophy)	2	6	2
Crawley Town (loan)	2016–17	League Two	15	1	—		—		—		15	1
Torquay United (loan)	2017–18	National League	8	1	1	0	—		0	0	9	1
Gillingham	2017–18	League One	1	0	—		—		—		1	0
Chelmsford City	2018–19	National League South	38	25	1	0	—		4 (Note: Three appearances and three goals in Essex Senior Cup, one appearance in National League South play-offs)	3	43	28
Yeovil Town	2019–20	National League	30	17	1	0	—		3 (Note: Two appearances and three goals in FA Trophy, one appearance in National League play-offs)	3	34	20
Yeovil Town	2020–21	National League	28	12	3	2	—		0	0	31	14
Yeovil Town	Total		58	29	4	2	—		3	3	65	34
Southend United	2021–22	National League	21	7	2	2	—		1	0	24	9
Southend United	2022–23	National League	11	2	1	0	—		0	0	12	2
Southend United	Total		32	9	3	2	—		1	0	36	11
Yeovil Town	2023–24	National League South	25	10	5	5	—		0	0	30	15
Dorking Wanderers	2024–25	National League South	18	5	1	0	—		4 (Note: Three appearances and five goals in Surrey Senior Cup, one appearance in National League South play-offs)	5	23	10
Horsham	2025–26	National League South	33	5	1	1	—		5	2	38	8
Farnham Town (loan)	2025–26	Southern League Premier Division South	7	1	—		—		2 (Note: Appearance(s) in Southern League Premier Division South play-offs)	0	9	1
Career total			382	127	22	9	1	0	22	15	427	151

== Honours ==
Arsenal

- Premier Academy League: 2008–09
- FA Youth Cup: 2008–09

AFC Wimbledon

- Football League Two play-offs: 2016

Yeovil Town

- National League South: 2023–24

England U19

- UEFA European Under-19 Championship runner-up: 2009

Individual

- Chelmsford City Player of the Year: 2018–19
- Chelmsford City Players' Player of the Year: 2018–19
- Chelmsford City Away Player of the Year: 2018–19
