= Sanchez Watt =

English footballer (born 1991)

Personal information
- Full name: Herschel Oulio Sanchez Watt
- Date of birth: 14 February 1991 (age 35)
- Place of birth: Hackney, London, England
- Height: 5 ft 10 in (1.78 m)
- Positions: Forward; winger

Youth career
- –1998: Senrab
- 1998–2009: Arsenal

Senior career*
Years	Team	Apps	(Gls)
2009–2013	Arsenal	0	(0)
2010	→ Southend United (loan)	4	(0)
2010	→ Leeds United (loan)	6	(0)
2010–2011	→ Leeds United (loan)	22	(1)
2011–2012	→ Sheffield Wednesday (loan)	4	(0)
2012	→ Crawley Town (loan)	14	(2)
2012	→ Colchester United (loan)	6	(2)
2013–2015	Colchester United	43	(6)
2015	Kerala Blasters	9	(2)
2016–2017	Crawley Town	2	(0)
2017–2018	Billericay Town	11	(1)
2018	→ Hemel Hempstead Town (loan)	11	(4)
2018–2019	Hemel Hempstead Town	48	(5)
2019–2020	Wealdstone	17	(1)
Total		197	(24)

International career
2006	England U16	2	(0)
2007–2008	England U17	6	(3)
2009–2010	England U19	4	(0)
- * Club domestic league appearances and goals

Herschel Oulio Sanchez Watt (born 14 February 1991) is a former English professional footballer who played as a forward or winger.

He has represented England at under-16, under-17 and under-19 levels, and he is also eligible to play for Wales and Jamaica through his Welsh mother and Jamaican father.

Watt is a product of Arsenal's youth academy and came to prominence during the Gunners' 2008–09 FA Youth Cup winning season, and made his full debut for the Arsenal first-team in the League Cup the following season. He has featured on loan for a number of Football League clubs, including Southend United, two spells at Leeds United, Sheffield Wednesday, Crawley Town and Colchester United. He signed for Colchester on a permanent basis following his release from Arsenal in the summer of 2013.

== Early career ==
Watt was born in Hackney, London, to a Welsh mother and a Jamaican father. As a promising youngster, he drew interest from FC Barcelona before being discovered by Arsenal scout Gary Nott as a seven-year-old playing in Victoria Park, London, for Sunday league side Senrab.

== Club career ==
=== Arsenal ===
Watt signed his first professional contract with Arsenal in the summer of 2008 after joining as a scholar in 2007. He was a key member of the Arsenal under-18 double winning team during the 2008–09 season, and featured in all eight of Arsenal's FA Youth Cup fixtures, scoring a brace in the semi-final and netting in both legs of the final against Liverpool. Following his impressive season, he was handed a place in the starting line-up for the Gunners' traditional season-opening friendly against Barnet alongside strike-partner Andrey Arshavin, and was later named on the substitutes bench for a Champions League match against Standard Liège on 16 September 2009.

Watt made his professional debut a memorable one when he scored the opening goal in a 2–0 League Cup win against West Bromwich Albion on 22 September 2009. He had got himself onto the end of a rebound after Carlos Vela's shot was saved. He became the 85th debut goalscorer for Arsenal, the fifth under Arsène Wenger's reign, behind Thomas Vermaelen, Emmanuel Adebayor, Freddie Ljungberg and Samir Nasri. He also featured in Arsenal's League Cup fourth round victory over Liverpool at the Emirates Stadium on 28 October, replacing Nicklas Bendtner after 76 minutes, and featured as a substitute once again in their 3–0 defeat to Manchester City on 2 December, replacing Craig Eastmond after 68 minutes. He signed an extended contract with the club in November 2009, and went on to score five goals in ten reserve games for the club during the remainder of the season. After his loan spells away from the club, Watt again signed a contract extension with Arsenal in October 2011, having scored five times in six reserve appearances in the 2011–12 season. Watt eventually left Arsenal without making a Premier League appearance for the club.

==== Southend United loan ====
On 1 February 2010, Watt signed for League One side Southend United for an initial one-month loan. He went straight into Steve Tilson's starting line up for the Essex derby match with Colchester United on 8 February. The Shrimpers fell to a 2–0 defeat to their bitter rivals, with Watt featuring for the full 90 minutes. He made three further appearances against Tranmere Rovers, Milton Keynes Dons and Charlton Athletic, before returning to Arsenal. During his short spell with the club, he picked up head and ankle injuries.

==== Leeds United loans ====
Following his loan deal with Southend, Watt signed a loan deal with fellow League One side Leeds United on 25 March 2010, which would see him stay with the club until the end of the season. After not being involved in Leeds' 1–0 defeat against Norwich City on 27 March, Watt was named on the bench for Leeds in their 3–0 home defeat by Swindon Town on 3 April, but would eventually make his debut for the club as an 88th-minute substitute for Jermaine Beckford in their 2–1 away win at Yeovil Town on 5 April. Watt also made a late substitute appearance in Leeds' 2–0 home win over his former club Southend on 10 April. Watt was named in the starting line-up for their game with MK Dons on 24 April, which Leeds won 4–1, providing two assists during the match. Watt's final loan appearance came as a substitute in the final game of the season against Bristol Rovers, helping the team earn a 2–1 win in a result which confirmed automatic promotion to the Championship for Leeds. He made six appearances for the club during his first loan spell, with five of those appearances coming from the bench.

On 3 August 2010, Watt rejoined Leeds United on a season-long loan deal. He made his second debut for Leeds in their first game of the 2010–11 season against Derby County on 7 August, a match which ended in a 2–1 defeat. Watt made an impact in the following game, a 4–0 League Cup win against Lincoln City. He first provided the assist for Luciano Becchio's seventh-minute goal, and then won Leeds a penalty which was converted by Neil Kilkenny. Watt suffered an ankle problem that prevented him from playing since appearing in Leeds' 2–1 defeat to Leicester City on 19 October.

Watt returned to action on New Years Day 2011 for Leeds' 1–1 draw with Middlesbrough at Elland Road, replacing Robert Snodgrass after 76 minutes to play his first game for almost three months. Leeds were drawn to face Watt's parent club Arsenal in the FA Cup third round, as Watt was granted permission by Arsène Wenger to play against his employers. Watt started the game for Leeds on 8 January, as he helped his team earn an impressive 1–1 draw at the Emirates Stadium. Between the replay which was to be held at Elland Road, Leeds faced Scunthorpe United in the league on 15 January. Watt opened the scoring on 17 minutes with his first goal since his Arsenal debut in September 2009. The match ended 4–0 to the Whites. Watt then featured in the FA Cup replay against Arsenal, in which Leeds were defeated 3–1 at home on 19 January.

Throughout his second spell with Leeds, Watt was hampered by a number of injuries that limited his playing time. He made 12 starts and 13 substitute appearances for the club as they ended their first season back in the Championship in seventh position, just outside the play-offs. His final appearance came in the final day win at Queens Park Rangers as an 85th-minute substitute for Max Gradel.

==== Sheffield Wednesday loan ====
Having been prolific in the Arsenal reserve team since his return from his Leeds United loan, scoring seven goals in eight games and signing a contract extension, Watt joined League One high-fliers Sheffield Wednesday on loan on 23 November 2011 until 16 January 2012. After missing the Owls' 1–0 wins in League One and the FA Cup against Leyton Orient and Aldershot respectively, Watt made his debut on 10 December in a 2–0 away win over Oldham Athletic, earning his side a penalty in the process before being substituted on 88 minutes. After making two starts and two substitute appearances for Wednesday, Watt was omitted from the squad to face Charlton Athletic on 14 January, with manager Gary Megson announcing that Watt's loan spell with the club would not be extended. He stated that Watt was "not physically up to the demands" of League One football. Despite the lack of opportunities, Watt said that he had developed as a player since joining the club on loan, adapting to a different style of play for a club where there were "big expectations".

==== Crawley Town loan ====
Following his loan spell with Sheffield Wednesday, Watt signed on loan for ambitious League Two club Crawley Town until the end of the season, with Crawley looking to achieve successive promotions. Watt made his debut for the club two days later in the FA Cup fourth round tie at Championship side Hull City, a match which Crawley won 1–0 and saw them reach the fifth round for the second consecutive season. Watt was instrumental in his first league game for the club on 7 February, when Crawley hosted Cheltenham Town. He levelled the scores at 1–1 with a 30-yard strike after Luke Garbutt had opened the proceedings for Cheltenham, before scoring the fourth goal for Crawley to bring the score to 4–1 after the half-time break. Despite Cheltenham grabbing a consolation goal, the result meant that Crawley leapfrogged the Robins to go to the top of League Two.

Watt helped the club to automatic promotion from League Two, making 16 appearances across all competitions in addition to scoring his two goals for the club.

==== Colchester United loan ====
Watt, alongside Arsenal teammate Craig Eastmond, signed for League One club Colchester United on 27 September 2012, both on a three-month loan deal. They both signed alongside MK Dons striker Jabo Ibehre on the same day that Joe Dunne was appointed manager for the Essex club. Watt made his debut on 29 September in Colchester's 3–1 victory against Hartlepool United at the Colchester Community Stadium.

He started for the U's in a 1–0 win at Swindon Town and a 3–1 away defeat to Yeovil Town, before scoring his first goal in his fourth appearance for the club, securing a 1–0 win over Stevenage on 13 October with the only goal of the game. After the match, he described netting his first goal for the club and helping them win as "the best feeling ever". Watt provided two assists in his next match as Colchester overcame Carlisle United 2–0 on 20 October, setting up both Eastmond and Ibehre with low crosses. However, he was forced off in the second half after picking up an injury. He scored his second and final goal of his loan spell on 27 October when he came on as a second-half substitute for Gavin Massey, handing the U's a 2–0 lead in what would finish a 2–2 draw with Shrewsbury Town at the New Meadow. Watt was to play the final game of his stint with Colchester on 3 November, when the U's faced Essex neighbours Chelmsford City in the first round of the FA Cup, having been given the go ahead by his parent club to play in the fixture. Colchester lost the match to their Conference South counterparts by 3–1, as Watt suffered a torn hamstring, ruling him out for several weeks and cutting his loan short. United manager Joe Dunne confirmed that Watt was likely to return to the Emirates for treatment. Despite featuring just seven times in his time with the club, Watt left a lasting impression on Dunne, with the Colchester boss affirming his interest in signing the player should he decide to leave Arsenal.

=== Colchester United ===
On 30 May 2013, Arsenal announced that Watt was one of ten young professional players that would be leaving the club when their contracts expire on 30 June. Colchester United assistant manager Mark Kinsella confirmed that the former U's loanee was a target, with the club having already signed his former Arsenal teammate Craig Eastmond. On 28 June, Watt's transfer to Colchester was made permanent, signing a two-year contract with the Essex outfit. Following an injury sustained during a pre-season win against Maldon & Tiptree, Watt made his second debut for Colchester in a League Cup clash with Peterborough United on 6 August, coming on as a substitute for Alex Gilbey on 65 minutes as the U's succumbed to a heavy 5–1 home defeat. He then made his first league start of the season in a 1–0 win against Port Vale four days later. Watt was plagued by a troublesome ankle injury over the first few weeks of the season, and despite using an ice machine in an attempt to heal the issue, he became one of a number of players facing the treatment table as the first-team suffered an injury crisis. He was on the verge of a comeback in early October 2013 following a thigh injury that had kept him out of action, but was dealt a further blow with a quad injury that would rule him out for at least a further six weeks. He returned to training in early December, and finally returned to action on 26 December. He appeared as a substitute during Colchester's biggest win under Joe Dunne, a 4–0 win against Stevenage. Watt bagged an assist for himself in the process, setting up Craig Eastmond with a simple pass 13 minutes from time to round off the scoring. He scored his first goal of the season in an instrumental display against Gillingham on 11 January 2014, securing the opening goal in a 3–0 home victory. In the next match against Carlisle United, he netted a brace in the 4–2 win at Brunton Park on 18 January. Watt was sent off on his birthday for a second bookable offence when the U's visited Swindon Town in a 0–0 draw. The ensuing ban left Watt out of first-team action until 4 March, when he returned for Colchester's home fixture against high-flying Rotherham United. In the match, he hit the bar and had a goal disallowed after Clinton Morrison was judged to have fouled Millers goalkeeper Adam Collin. He ended the 2013–14 campaign with 23 appearances and three goals to his name.

Once again, Watt suffered a disrupted pre-season for Colchester, having been ruled out over the summer break with a knee injury. He returned on 25 July 2014 when he participated in the club's 2–2 friendly draw with Dover Athletic. He missed the start of the season after suffering from tendonitis, and made his return from injury for the under-21 development squad as they held Sheffield United to a 0–0 draw in their Professional Development League Two fixture. Watt made his first appearance of the season as a second-half substitute for Gavin Massey during Colchester's 3–1 home defeat to Peterborough United on 30 August. He returned to the starting line-up for the U's 0–0 away draw with Walsall in new manager Tony Humes' first match in charge, before scoring his first goal of the season for 10-man Colchester in their first win of the season at Leyton Orient on 13 September, a match which ended 2–0 after Watt had opened the scoring on a fast break. His second of the season completed a resounding 3–0 victory against League One's bottom club Crewe Alexandra on 27 September as he diverted home a Freddie Sears cross from close range. Watt converted a penalty won by Rhys Healey in a 3–3 Football League Trophy draw with Gillingham on 8 October. He netted his fourth goal of the season in Colchester's 6–3 FA Cup first round meeting with Gosport Borough on 9 November, converting Freddie Sears' cross on the volley from six yards, before scrambling home Colchester's equaliser at 1–1 in their 3–2 away defeat at Barnsley on 14 November. With his contract expiring in the summer of 2015, Watt was released by the club after struggling to maintain a regular place in Tony Humes' starting line-up.

He went on trial at Bradford City in July 2015.

=== Kerala Blasters ===
On 3 August 2015, he signed for Indian Super League side Kerala Blasters on a free transfer from Colchester United. He made his debut and scored his first goal for the team on 6 October 2015 against NorthEast United which Kerala Blasters won 3–1. He scored the team's third goal in the 73rd minute which sealed the match in the favour of Kerala Blasters.

He scored his second goal in home match against FC Pune City and was awarded "Hero of the Match" (ISL's Man of the Match) for his attacking play.

=== Crawley Town ===
On 1 November 2016, Watt joined League Two side Crawley Town on a short-term contract. On 7 December 2016, Watt made his Crawley return in a 1–0 defeat against Coventry City in the EFL Trophy knockout stages. After only featuring three times in all competitions, Watt left Crawley, following the conclusion of his contract in January 2017.

=== Billericay Town ===
On 7 November 2017, Watt joined Isthmian League Premier Division side Billericay Town on a short-term contract, initially for two games.

On 16 May 2018, following a short-term loan spell at National League South side Hemel Hempstead Town, where he was once almost sent off for telling the referee his name, it was announced that Watt would leave Billericay upon the expiry of his contract in June. He resigned for Hemel Hempstead ahead of the 2018–19 season.

=== Wealdstone FC ===
On 2 August 2019 Watt joined National League South side Wealdstone. Watt scored his first and only goal for the club on 7 March 2020, a header which proved to be the winning goal in an eventual 2-1 victory over Dulwich Hamlet. Watt made a total of 17 appearances in a season which was cut short by COVID-19, which saw Wealdstone promoted on points per game. He departed the club at the end of the season.

== International career ==
Watt has represented England at under-16, under-17 and under-19 levels. In addition to England, he is also eligible to represent Jamaica and Wales. Watt made his debut for England at under-19 level in a 2–1 friendly victory against Russia at the New Meadow, Shrewsbury, on 8 September 2009. He made his second appearance for the Young Lions on 17 November 2009 as a substitute for Nile Ranger at Glanford Park, Scunthorpe.

== Style of play ==
Arsenal manager Arsène Wenger spoke of his admiration for Watt on a number of occasions, stating that he liked "his movement, his sharpness, his great work rate, his left-footed quality". He also thought that Watt was a "determined" player. He described Watt as a "street player" who "makes fantastic runs, he is an aggressive striker and he always finds resources to be dangerous". He said Watt was involved in the first-team group because "he works hard for the team".

== Career statistics ==
As of match played 18 August 2023

Appearances and goals by club, season and competition
Club	Season	League			National Cup		League Cup		Other		Total	
Club	Season	Division	Apps	Goals	Apps	Goals	Apps	Goals	Apps	Goals	Apps	Goals
Arsenal	2009–10	Premier League	0	0	0	0	3	1	0	0	3	1
Arsenal	2010–11	Premier League	0	0	0	0	0	0	0	0	0	0
Arsenal	2011–12	Premier League	0	0	0	0	0	0	0	0	0	0
Arsenal	2012–13	Premier League	0	0	0	0	0	0	0	0	0	0
Arsenal	Total		0	0	0	0	3	1	0	0	3	1
Southend United (loan)	2009–10	League One	4	0	0	0	0	0	0	0	4	0
Leeds United (loan)	2009–10	League One	6	0	0	0	0	0	0	0	6	0
Leeds United (loan)	2010–11	Championship	22	1	2	0	2	0	—		26	1
Leeds United (loan)	Total		28	1	2	0	2	0	0	0	32	1
Sheffield Wednesday (loan)	2011–12	League One	4	0	0	0	0	0	0	0	4	0
Crawley Town (loan)	2011–12	League Two	14	2	2	0	0	0	0	0	16	2
Colchester United (loan)	2012–13	League One	6	2	1	0	0	0	0	0	7	2
Colchester United	2013–14	League One	22	3	0	0	1	0	0	0	23	3
Colchester United	2014–15	League One	21	3	3	1	0	0	1 (Note: Appearance(s) in Football League Trophy)	1	25	5
Colchester United	Total		43	6	3	1	1	0	1	1	48	8
Kerala Blasters	2015	Indian Super League	9	2	—		—		—		9	2
Crawley Town	2016–17	League Two	2	0	0	0	0	0	1 (Note: Appearance(s) in EFL Trophy)	0	3	0
Billericay Town	2017–18	Isthmian League Premier Division	11	1	0	0	—		8 (Note: Three appearances and one goal in Alan Turvey Trophy, five appearances in FA Trophy and one goal)	2	19	3
Hemel Hempstead Town (loan)	2017–18	National League South	11	4	0	0	—		1 (Note: Appearance(s) in National League South play-offs)	0	12	4
Hemel Hempstead Town	2017–18	National League South	22	2	0	0	—		0	0	22	2
Hemel Hempstead Town	2018–19	National League South	26	3	1	0	—		3 (Note: Three appearances and two goals in FA Trophy)	2	30	5
Hemel Hempstead Town	Total		48	5	1	0	—		3	2	62	7
Wealdstone	2019–20	National League South	17	1	2	0	—		0	0	19	1
Career total			197	24	11	1	6	1	14	5	228	31

== Honours ==
Arsenal

- 2008–09 Premier Academy League winner
- 2008–09 FA Youth Cup winner

Leeds United

- 2009–10 Football League One runner-up

Wealdstone

- 2019-20 National League South winner

All honours referenced by:
