= Kyle Bartley =

English footballer (born 1991)

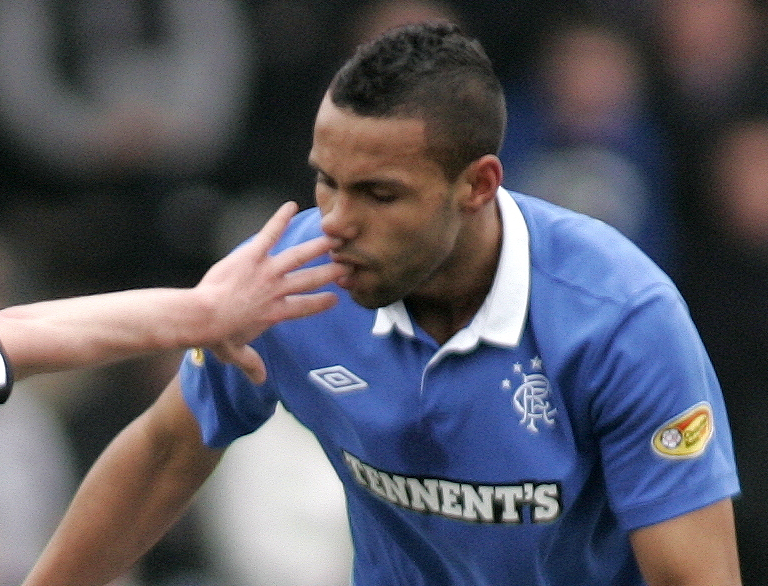
- Bartley playing for Rangers in 2011

Personal information
- Full name: Kyle Louis Bartley
- Date of birth: 22 May 1991 (age 35)
- Place of birth: Stockport, England
- Height: 6 ft 1 in (1.85 m)
- Position: Centre-back

Youth career
- Fletcher Moss Rangers
- 2005–2007: Bolton Wanderers
- 2007–2009: Arsenal

Senior career*
Years	Team	Apps	(Gls)
2009–2012	Arsenal	0	(0)
2010	→ Sheffield United (loan)	14	(0)
2010–2011	→ Sheffield United (loan)	21	(0)
2011	→ Rangers (loan)	5	(1)
2011–2012	→ Rangers (loan)	19	(0)
2012–2018	Swansea City	21	(0)
2013–2014	→ Birmingham City (loan)	17	(3)
2016–2017	→ Leeds United (loan)	45	(6)
2018–2025	West Bromwich Albion	215	(14)
Total		357	(24)

International career
2006–2007	England U16	5	(0)
2008	England U17	3	(0)
- * Club domestic league appearances and goals

Kyle Louis Bartley (born 22 May 1991) is an English former professional footballer who played as a centre-back.

Bartley started his career with Arsenal, making his debut in 2009. He spent some of the 2009 season and the first half of the 2010 season with Sheffield United in the Football League Championship. He then spent the second half of the 2010 season with Scottish Premier League club Rangers and returned to them for the 2011–12 campaign. He signed for Swansea City in 2012, and spent the first half of the 2013–14 season on loan to Championship club Birmingham City and the whole of the 2016–17 campaign on loan at Leeds United. After making just 21 league appearances for Swansea in six years, he joined West Bromwich Albion in 2018, later retiring at the end of the 2024–25 season season due to a knee injury.

He has also represented England at under-16 and under-17 level.

== Club career ==
=== Arsenal ===
==== Early career ====
Bartley was born in Stockport, Greater Manchester, and is of Jamaican descent. He played youth football for Fletcher Moss Rangers before joining Bolton Wanderers, and signed for Arsenal on 31 July 2007. He captained Arsenal reserves and was also part of the team that won both the Premier Academy League and the FA Youth Cup in 2009.

==== 2009–10 season ====
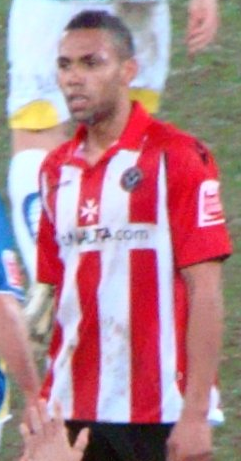
Bartley playing for Sheffield United in 2010

Bartley made his professional debut for Arsenal on 9 December 2009, in a Champions League match in an away defeat against Olympiacos. Bartley signed a three-month loan deal with Sheffield United in February 2010 to act as defensive cover. He played regularly during his time at Bramall Lane and returned to Arsenal at the end of the campaign having played 14 times.

==== 2010–11 season ====
On the eve of the following season, Bartley returned to Sheffield United on a season-long loan deal. In late September, Bartley suffered a broken cheekbone in a clash with Nottingham Forest striker Dele Adebola. After a month out, he returned and was ever-present until the January transfer window, when the "Blades" signed Neill Collins. Bartley feared losing his place in the team and asked to leave. His request was accepted and Bartley moved on loan to Scottish Premier League club Rangers on the last day of the transfer window. He made his debut for Rangers on 12 February 2011 in a 6–0 win over Motherwell at Ibrox. Bartley kept his place in the side, and he scored his first senior goal in a 1–0 victory over St Mirren on 6 March 2011.

A knee ligament injury sustained against PSV Eindhoven in the Europa League ruled him out of action for the remainder of the season, seeing him miss Rangers' Scottish League Cup final win over Celtic and the run-in to their league title win. He returned to Arsenal at the end of March, but stated he was keen to return to Rangers.

==== 2011–12 season ====
Bartley was a 74th-minute substitute for Laurent Koscielny in the final round of the Emirates Cup, a pre-season friendly competition. He scored an own goal in the 84th minute, as Arsenal lost the competition to the New York Red Bulls. On 3 August 2011, Bartley signed a new contract with Arsenal. The next day, he rejoined Rangers on loan for the season.

=== Swansea City ===
Bartley joined Swansea City on 16 August 2012 for a fee believed to be in the region of £1 million. He signed a three-year contract. He made his debut in the second round of the League Cup on 28 August against Barnsley. Swansea won the game 3–1. After an injury to Chico Flores Bartley was considered to replace him for the 2013 Football League Cup Final, however ultimately he was left out of the squad.

==== Birmingham City loan ====
On 2 July 2013, Bartley agreed a season-long loan move to Championship club Birmingham City. Although he had played little senior football over the previous year, and had not had a full pre-season, manager Lee Clark selected him for the opening match, playing alongside fellow loanee Dan Burn and experienced captain Paul Robinson in a three-man defence; Birmingham lost 1–0 at home to Watford. In the next match, Bartley scored his first goal in senior English football, an extra-time winner against Plymouth Argyle in the League Cup. His lack of sharpness and security in defence meant he was left out for the next match in favour of Hayden Mullins, and was selected less than Burn thereafter. He scored twice in a 3–1 win at Huddersfield Town on 9 November – both goals were headers from Jesse Lingard crosses – but was then sent off after receiving a second yellow card for what the referee deemed to be "over-celebrating".

On 29 January 2014, Bartley's season-long loan was cut-short after parent club Swansea City recalled him. Bartley made 19 appearances in all competitions for Birmingham, scoring 5 goals.

==== Return to Swansea ====
After impressing new Swansea manager Garry Monk on his return, Bartley was handed a new three-year contract with Swansea until June 2017.

On 24 January 2015, Bartley was sent off in the seventh minute of an FA Cup fourth round match away to Blackburn Rovers for a foul on Joshua King; Swansea lost 3–1 and also had Gylfi Sigurðsson dismissed later on.

==== Leeds United loan ====
On 1 July 2016, Bartley joined Championship club Leeds United on loan for the 2016–17 season. The move saw him link up with his former Swansea manager Garry Monk. He was given squad number 5. Bartley made his Leeds debut on 7 August against Queens Park Rangers in a 3–0 defeat, and scored his first goal for the club in a 2–1 win against Blackburn Rovers on 13 September.

Four days later, Bartley captained Leeds United to a 2–0 victory against Cardiff City, and he continued to deputise as captain when Liam Bridcutt was unavailable. On 3 October, after scoring in a 2–1 victory and producing a solid defensive display, Bartley was named in the EFL Team of the Week. On 17 December Bartley scored a late winner in a 1–0 win over Brentford to help maintain Leeds in the playoff positions; his performance saw him named in the EFL Team of the Week for the second time in the season.

After making 50 appearances in all competitions and scoring 6 goals, Leeds confirmed that Bartley would be returning to Swansea when his loan expired. Bartley announced, "I've said many times that I've loved every minute here. It's been a fantastic club for me, the fans have been great, the staff have been great and the players are fantastic".

==== Return to Swansea (2017–2018) ====
In August 2017, Bartley returned to Swansea and signed a new four-year contract. Later that month he picked up a serious knee injury in the EFL Cup match against MK Dons and was ruled out for several months with medial ligament damage in his knee which required surgery. After returning from injury in January 2018, Bartley picked up another knee injury in April 2018 which would rule him out for rest of the season.

=== West Bromwich Albion ===
On 16 July 2018, Bartley joined Championship club West Bromwich Albion on a three-year contract for an undisclosed fee. He scored his first goal for the club in a 4–1 win against Reading on 6 October 2018.

On 22 May 2024, he was offered a new contract by the club.

=== Retirement ===
On 8 August 2025, Bartley announced his retirement from playing due to a knee injury sustained the previous season. Following his retirement, he revealed that he would require a knee replacement as he had no ligament remaining.

== International career ==
Bartley has represented England at under-16 and under-17 levels.

== Personal life ==
In September 2025, Bartley graduated with a Diploma in Sports Directorship from the PFA Business School.

== Career statistics ==
Appearances and goals by club, season and competition
Club	Season	League			National cup		League cup		Other		Total	
Club	Season	Division	Apps	Goals	Apps	Goals	Apps	Goals	Apps	Goals	Apps	Goals
Arsenal	2009–10	Premier League	0	0	0	0	0	0	1 (Note: Appearances in UEFA Champions League)	0	1	0
Arsenal	2010–11	Premier League	0	0	0	0	0	0	0	0	0	0
Arsenal	2011–12	Premier League	0	0	0	0	0	0	0	0	0	0
Arsenal	Total		0	0	0	0	0	0	1	0	1	0
Sheffield United (loan)	2009–10	Championship	14	0	0	0	0	0	—		14	0
Sheffield United (loan)	2010–11	Championship	21	0	1	0	1	0	—		23	0
Rangers (loan)	2010–11	Scottish Premier League	5	1	1	0	0	0	3 (Note: Appearances in UEFA Europa League)	0	9	1
Rangers (loan)	2011–12	Scottish Premier League	19	0	2	0	0	0	0	0	21	0
Swansea City	2012–13	Premier League	2	0	2	0	1	0	—		5	0
Swansea City	2013–14	Premier League	2	0	1	0	—		0	0	3	0
Swansea City	2014–15	Premier League	7	0	2	0	1	0	—		10	0
Swansea City	2015–16	Premier League	5	0	1	0	2	0	—		8	0
Swansea City	2016–17	Premier League	0	0	0	0	0	0	—		0	0
Swansea City	2017–18	Premier League	5	0	6	0	1	0	—		12	0
Swansea City	Total		21	0	12	0	5	0	0	0	38	0
Birmingham City (loan)	2013–14	Championship	17	3	0	0	2	2	—		19	5
Leeds United (loan)	2016–17	Championship	45	6	1	0	4	0	—		50	6
West Bromwich Albion	2018–19	Championship	28	1	3	1	1	0	2 (Note: Appearances in EFL Championship play-offs)	0	34	2
West Bromwich Albion	2019–20	Championship	38	2	2	0	0	0	—		40	2
West Bromwich Albion	2020–21	Premier League	30	3	1	0	0	0	—		31	3
West Bromwich Albion	2021–22	Championship	39	2	1	0	0	0	—		40	2
West Bromwich Albion	2022–23	Championship	13	2	0	0	2	0	—		15	2
West Bromwich Albion	2023–24	Championship	36	4	2	0	1	0	2	0	41	4
West Bromwich Albion	2024–25	Championship	31	0	0	0	0	0	0	0	31	0
West Bromwich Albion	Total		215	14	9	1	4	0	4	0	232	15
Career total			357	24	26	1	16	2	8	0	407	27

== Honours ==
Arsenal

- Premier Academy League: 2008–09
- FA Youth Cup: 2008–09
