= 2008–09 Premier Academy League =

- Champions: Arsenal U18S
- Goals: 1,975
- Average goals/game: 3.51
- Biggest home win: Ipswich Town U18s 7 – 0 Birmingham City U18S (25 April)
- Biggest away win: Blackburn Rovers U18s 0 – 8 Manchester City U18s (1 November)
- Highest scoring: Tottenham Hotspur U18s 6 – 6 Coventry City U18s (22 November)
- Longest winning run: 11, Sunderland U18s (1 November – 14 March)
- Longest unbeaten run: 28 (all group game), Manchester City U18s (23 August – 18 May); 26 (inc. play-off), Manchester City U18s (23 August – 2 May)
- Longest losing run: 11, Milton Keynes Dons U18s (1 November – 28 February)

The 2008–09 Premier Academy League Under–18 season was the twelfth edition since the establishment of The Premier Academy League, and the fifth under the current make-up. The first matches of the season were played on 23 August 2008, and the season ended on 18 May 2009.

All teams played the other teams in their group twice and played 10 inter-group fixtures, producing 28 games a season. Eight of the inter-group games were played against teams in their 'paired group' (i.e. A–B and C–D are the paired groups), whilst the remaining two games comprise one game against a team in each of the two remaining groups. Winners of each group qualified for play-offs.

Arsenal became the first group winners by leading Crystal Palace 20 points with 6 games left in Group A after a 1–0 win against Watford on 21 March 2009. Group C champions Manchester City set up tie with Arsenal in the play-off the following week by recording a 23–game unbeaten run which last to 26 games. Sunderland secured top spot in Group D after achieving the 14th win in last 15 games on 31 March. These 3 teams all clinched the group title for a third successive season. Tottenham Hotspur claimed the last play-off spot after beating Watford 2–1 on 6 May.

Arsenal reached the 2009 Premier Academy League Play-off Final with a 2–1 victory over Manchester City at the City of Manchester Stadium on 8 May. Tottenham Hotspur set up clash with Arsenal after defeating Sunderland 2–1 at the Stadium of Light on 13 May.

On 17 May, Arsenal were crowned the 2008–09 Premier Academy League Champions after a 1–0 win against Tottenham Hotspur in the Play-off Final at White Hart Lane, with a goal from Rhys Murphy. It is Arsenal's first title since the Premier Academy League reformed as an under–18 competition.

== League tables ==
=== Academy Group A ===
| Pos | Team | Pld | W | D | L | GF | GA | GD | Pts |
|---|---|---|---|---|---|---|---|---|---|
| 1 | Arsenal U18s (C) | 28 | 22 | 4 | 2 | 71 | 31 | +40 | 70 |
| 2 | Norwich City U18s | 28 | 13 | 6 | 9 | 46 | 42 | +4 | 45 |
| 3 | Ipswich Town U18s | 28 | 14 | 2 | 12 | 55 | 53 | +2 | 44 |
| 4 | Crystal Palace U18s | 28 | 12 | 4 | 12 | 51 | 47 | +4 | 40 |
| 5 | West Ham United U18s | 28 | 10 | 8 | 10 | 51 | 38 | +13 | 38 |
| 6 | Southampton U18s | 28 | 12 | 2 | 14 | 49 | 56 | −7 | 38 |
| 7 | Portsmouth U18s | 28 | 10 | 5 | 13 | 48 | 52 | −4 | 35 |
| 8 | Chelsea U18s | 28 | 10 | 4 | 14 | 57 | 65 | −8 | 34 |
| 9 | Fulham U18s | 28 | 8 | 9 | 11 | 44 | 45 | −1 | 33 |
| 10 | Charlton Athletic U18s | 28 | 6 | 4 | 20 | 32 | 65 | −33 | 22 |

=== Academy Group B ===
| Pos | Team | Pld | W | D | L | GF | GA | GD | Pts |
|---|---|---|---|---|---|---|---|---|---|
| 1 | Tottenham Hotspur U18s (C) | 28 | 19 | 7 | 2 | 85 | 36 | +49 | 64 |
| 2 | Leicester City U18s | 28 | 19 | 3 | 6 | 90 | 48 | +42 | 60 |
| 3 | Aston Villa U18s | 28 | 16 | 6 | 6 | 66 | 42 | +24 | 54 |
| 4 | Coventry City U18s | 28 | 15 | 8 | 5 | 62 | 46 | +16 | 53 |
| 5 | Reading U18s | 28 | 10 | 5 | 13 | 44 | 52 | −8 | 35 |
| 6 | Bristol City U18s | 28 | 9 | 6 | 13 | 63 | 67 | −4 | 33 |
| 7 | Cardiff City U18s | 28 | 7 | 7 | 14 | 33 | 48 | −15 | 28 |
| 8 | Watford U18s | 28 | 7 | 4 | 17 | 43 | 58 | −15 | 25 |
| 9 | Birmingham City U18s | 28 | 7 | 4 | 17 | 30 | 64 | −34 | 25 |
| 10 | Milton Keynes Dons U18s | 28 | 3 | 4 | 21 | 26 | 81 | −55 | 13 |

=== Academy Group C ===
| Pos | Team | Pld | W | D | L | GF | GA | GD | Pts |
|---|---|---|---|---|---|---|---|---|---|
| 1 | Manchester City U18s (C) | 28 | 22 | 6 | 0 | 88 | 33 | +55 | 72 |
| 2 | Manchester United U18s | 28 | 15 | 8 | 5 | 65 | 34 | +31 | 53 |
| 3 | West Bromwich Albion U18s | 28 | 13 | 5 | 10 | 55 | 37 | +18 | 44 |
| 4 | Liverpool U18s | 28 | 13 | 5 | 10 | 56 | 49 | +7 | 44 |
| 5 | Everton U18s | 28 | 11 | 8 | 9 | 49 | 39 | +10 | 41 |
| 6 | Stoke City U18s | 28 | 11 | 7 | 10 | 30 | 41 | −11 | 40 |
| 7 | Wolverhampton Wanderers U18s | 28 | 10 | 9 | 9 | 36 | 39 | −3 | 39 |
| 8 | Crewe Alexandra U18s | 28 | 11 | 5 | 12 | 54 | 53 | +1 | 38 |
| 9 | Blackburn Rovers U18s | 28 | 8 | 6 | 14 | 36 | 50 | −14 | 30 |
| 10 | Bolton Wanderers U18s | 28 | 7 | 2 | 19 | 28 | 57 | −29 | 23 |

=== Academy Group D ===
| Pos | Team | Pld | W | D | L | GF | GA | GD | Pts |
|---|---|---|---|---|---|---|---|---|---|
| 1 | Sunderland U18s (C) | 28 | 22 | 2 | 4 | 62 | 30 | +32 | 68 |
| 2 | Newcastle United U18s | 28 | 13 | 7 | 8 | 55 | 46 | +9 | 46 |
| 3 | Derby County U18s | 28 | 11 | 7 | 10 | 55 | 51 | +4 | 40 |
| 4 | Sheffield United U18s | 28 | 8 | 11 | 9 | 34 | 43 | −9 | 35 |
| 5 | Nottingham Forest U18s | 28 | 9 | 3 | 16 | 41 | 50 | −9 | 33 |
| 6 | Leeds United U18s | 28 | 9 | 5 | 14 | 41 | 43 | −2 | 32 |
| 7 | Barnsley U18s | 28 | 7 | 7 | 14 | 34 | 64 | −30 | 28 |
| 8 | Sheffield Wednesday U18s | 28 | 6 | 6 | 16 | 27 | 47 | −20 | 24 |
| 9 | Huddersfield Town U18s | 28 | 5 | 9 | 14 | 37 | 69 | −32 | 24 |
| 10 | Middlesbrough U18s | 28 | 5 | 8 | 15 | 39 | 57 | −18 | 23 |

Rules for classification: 1st points; 2nd goal difference; 3rd goals scored
Pos = Position; Pld = Matches played; W = Matches won; D = Matches drawn; L = Matches lost; GF = Goals for; GA = Goals against; GD = Goal difference; Pts = Points
C = Champions

== Play-off semi-finals ==
8 May 2009
19:00 BST

| Manchester City U18s | 1–2 | Arsenal U18s |
|---|---|---|
| Abdisalam Ibrahim 41' | Report | Cedric Evina 14'; Rhys Murphy 76' |

City of Manchester Stadium, Manchester
Attendance: TBA
Referee: Andrew Scregg (Liverpool)

13 May 2009
19:00 BST

| Sunderland U18s | 1–2 | Tottenham Hotspur U18s |
|---|---|---|
| Ryan Noble 71' (pen.) | Report | Ryan Mason 39' (pen.); Andros Townsend 43' |

Stadium of Light, Sunderland
Attendance: 314
Referee: Steve Rowntree (North Yorkshire)

== Play-off Final ==
17 May 2009
16:00 BST

| Tottenham Hotspur U18s | 0–1 | Arsenal U18s |
|---|---|---|
| | Report | Rhys Murphy 50' |

White Hart Lane, Tottenham
Attendance: 5,090
Referee: Carl Berry (Surrey)

== Records ==
- Most group wins: 22, Arsenal, Manchester City and Sunderland
- Most league wins: 24, Arsenal
- Fewest wins: 3, Milton Keynes Dons
- Fewest group defeats: 0, Manchester City
- Fewest league defeats: 1, Manchester City
- Most defeats: 21, Milton Keynes Dons
- Most points: 72, Manchester City
- Fewest points: 13, Milton Keynes Dons
- Most goals scored: 90, Leicester City
- Fewest goals scored: 26, Milton Keynes Dons
- Fewest group goals conceded: 30, Sunderland
- Fewest league goals conceded: 32, Arsenal and Sunderland
- Most goals conceded: 81, Milton Keynes Dons
- Highest goal difference: 55, Manchester City
- Lowest goal difference: −55, Milton Keynes Dons

== See also ==
- Premier Reserve League 2008–09
- FA Youth Cup 2008–09
- Premier League 2008–09
- 2008–09 in English football

| Group A | Group B | Group C | Group D |
|---|---|---|---|
| Arsenal; Charlton Athletic; Chelsea; Crystal Palace; Fulham; Ipswich Town; Norwich City; Portsmouth; Southampton; West Ham United | Aston Villa; Birmingham City; Bristol City; Cardiff City; Coventry City; Leicester City; Milton Keynes Dons; Reading; Tottenham Hotspur; Watford | Blackburn Rovers; Bolton Wanderers; Crewe Alexandra; Everton; Liverpool; Manchester City; Manchester United; Stoke City; West Bromwich Albion; Wolverhampton Wanderers | Barnsley; Derby County; Huddersfield Town; Leeds United; Middlesbrough; Newcastle United; Nottingham Forest; Sheffield United; Sheffield Wednesday; Sunderland |
