= 2007–08 Liverpool F.C. season =

English football club season

Liverpool
2007–08 season
- Chairman: Tom Hicks and George Gillett
- Manager: Rafael Benítez
- Premier League: 4th
- FA Cup: Fifth round
- League Cup: Quarter-finals
- UEFA Champions League: Semi-finals
- Top goalscorer: League: Fernando Torres (24); All: Fernando Torres (33)
- Highest home attendance: 44,459 v Manchester United (16 December 2007, Premier League)
- Lowest home attendance: 41,095 v Porto (28 November 2007, UEFA Champions League)
Home colours	Away colours	Third colours

The 2007–08 season was Liverpool Football Club's 116th season in their history, and their 46th consecutive season in the top-flight of English football, The season covers the period from 1 July 2007 to 30 June 2008.

Having finished third the previous season, Liverpool qualified for the UEFA Champions League final qualifying stage.

== First-team squad ==
Note: Flags indicate national team as defined under FIFA eligibility rules; some limited exceptions apply. Players may hold more than one non-FIFA nationality.

No.	Pos.	Nation	Player
3	DF	IRL	Steve Finnan
4	DF	FIN	Sami Hyypiä
5	DF	DEN	Daniel Agger
6	DF	NOR	John Arne Riise
7	MF	AUS	Harry Kewell
8	MF	ENG	Steven Gerrard (captain)
9	FW	ESP	Fernando Torres
10	FW	UKR	Andriy Voronin
11	MF	ISR	Yossi Benayoun
12	DF	BRA	Fábio Aurélio
14	MF	ESP	Xabi Alonso
15	FW	ENG	Peter Crouch
16	MF	ENG	Jermaine Pennant
17	DF	ESP	Álvaro Arbeloa
18	FW	NED	Dirk Kuyt
19	FW	NED	Ryan Babel
20	MF	ARG	Javier Mascherano

No.	Pos.	Nation	Player
21	MF	BRA	Lucas
23	DF	ENG	Jamie Carragher (vice-captain)
25	GK	ESP	Pepe Reina
30	GK	FRA	Charles Itandje (Note: Itandje was born in Bobigny, France, and represented them at U-21 level, but also qualified to represent Cameroon internationally and would make his international debut for Cameroon in 2013.)
33	MF	ARG	Sebastián Leto
34	MF	ENG	Jay Spearing
35	MF	ENG	Ray Putterill
36	MF	SCO	Ryan Flynn
37	DF	SVK	Martin Škrtel
38	FW	ENG	Craig Lindfield
39	DF	ENG	Stephen Darby
40	GK	ENG	David Martin
42	FW	MAR	Nabil El Zhar (Note: El Zhar was born in Alès, France, and represented them at U-20 level, but also qualified to represent Morocco internationally through his parents and made his international debut for Morocco in March 2008.)
45	DF	ESP	Mikel San José
47	MF	FRA	Damien Plessis
48	DF	ARG	Emiliano Insúa

=== Left club during season ===
Note: Flags indicate national team as defined under FIFA eligibility rules; some limited exceptions apply. Players may hold more than one non-FIFA nationality.

No.	Pos.	Nation	Player
22	MF	MLI	Mohamed Sissoko (Note: Sissoko was born in Mont-Saint-Aignan, France, but also qualified to represent Mali internationally and made his international debut for Mali in 2004.)
44	DF	ENG	Robbie Threlfall

No.	Pos.	Nation	Player
46	DF	ENG	Jack Hobbs

== Season summary ==
=== August ===
Liverpool began their Premier League season with a trip to Aston Villa, which they won 2–1. This was followed by the first-leg of their UEFA Champions League qualifier against Toulouse. The game, unusually played on a weekday afternoon, was won 1–0 by Liverpool. Next came their first home game of the season, a Premier League match against Chelsea. Liverpool took the lead through Fernando Torres's first goal for the club, but Chelsea hit back with a disputed penalty from Frank Lampard, ending the game 1–1. Referee Rob Styles appeared to book Michael Essien twice without sending him off, similar to Graham Poll at the 2006 FIFA World Cup. Styles later admitted to have made an incorrect decision to award the penalty and, unusually, apologised to Liverpool for his mistake; he was subsequently dropped for the next gameweek.

The third Premier League game of the season, was a 2–0 away win at Sunderland, It was notable for Mohamed Sissoko's first (and only) Liverpool goal, after more than two years. This was also the Reds' 7,000th league goal. The following Tuesday saw Liverpool play Toulouse at Anfield in the second-leg of their UEFA Champions League qualifying tie. Before kick-off, the Everton song "Z Cars" echoed around Anfield, in memory of 11-year-old Rhys Jones, a local boy who had been shot dead the previous week. The match finished 4–0 to Liverpool, and the club qualified for the group stage winning 5–0 on aggregate.

=== September ===
Liverpool won their first match of September, 6–0 against Derby County, Liverpool's biggest league win since 26 April 2003 when they beat West Bromwich Albion by the same scoreline. This win took them to the top of the Premier League table for the first time under Rafael Benítez.

After a two-week international break, Liverpool's next Premier League match was away to Portsmouth. The match ended in a 0–0 draw, after Pepe Reina saved Nwankwo Kanu's penalty-kick. The following week, the Premier League match against Birmingham City at Anfield, also ended in a 0–0 draw.

In between those two Premier League draws Liverpool travelled to Porto to begin their UEFA Champions League group stage campaign against another club that had previously won the competition. The game, which ended 1–1, saw Jermaine Pennant sent-off after receiving two yellow cards.

Liverpool got back to winning ways when they travelled to Reading for a League Cup third round match. Liverpool beat their hosts 4–2, with Fernando Torres scoring his first hat-trick for the club. This was followed up with a Premier League success, away to Wigan Athletic at the JJB Stadium, where Yossi Benayoun's 75th-minute strike his second in two games was enough to secure three points.

=== October ===
October's first fixture was the visit of Marseille, Liverpool's second UEFA Champions League group stage match. A spectacular individual goal from Marseille midfielder Mathieu Valbuena handed Liverpool a 1–0 defeat, their first of the season. Liverpool manager Rafael Benítez described the match as possibly the worst performance by the club under his management.

Liverpool remained at Anfield for their following match, the Premier League visit of Tottenham Hotspur. A last-minute, injury-time, equaliser by Fernando Torres earned the Reds a 2–2 draw to preserve their unbeaten league record. However, Liverpool bounced back to win the Merseyside derby against Everton. The match at Goodison Park was a contentious one, with the referee's performance heavily criticised by Everton manager David Moyes. Dirk Kuyt scored two penalties that saw Liverpool come from behind to win 2–1.

Liverpool's third UEFA Champions League group stage match was a trip to Istanbul, where they had won the trophy in 2005. On this occasion, however, Liverpool fans had little to celebrate as their hosts Beşiktaş dealt their side's chances of progressing in the competition a serious blow by winning 2–1. The highest seeded club in their group, Liverpool were now bottom of their UEFA Champions League group with only one point from their first three matches.

Liverpool finished October with a pair of home fixtures. The Premier League visit of Arsenal yielded a 1–1 draw, whilst the League Cup visit of Cardiff City, who featured Liverpool legend Robbie Fowler in their starting line-up, gave the Reds a 2–1 win with Nabil El Zhar scoring his first Liverpool goal.

=== November ===
Liverpool began November with a 0–0 away draw against Blackburn Rovers, further extending their unbeaten run in the league. They followed this by finally injecting life into their UEFA Champions League campaign with an emphatic 8–0 home victory over Beşiktaş. A hat-trick from Yossi Benayoun, a goal from captain Steven Gerrard and two each from both Ryan Babel and Peter Crouch gave Liverpool fans something to celebrate as Liverpool established a new record for margin of victory in a UEFA Champions League match (the previous best, 7–0, had been held jointly by Arsenal and Juventus).

On 10 November 2007, the UEFA Champions League win was followed up with a Premier League one, as Liverpool beat Fulham 2–0 at Anfield. Fernando Torres came off the bench to break the deadlock in the 81st minute, and Steven Gerrard scored a penalty won by Peter Crouch four minutes later to seal the win.

After another international break, the club's thirteenth Premier league match took place, on 24 November 2007 at Newcastle United. Steven Gerrard, who had been booed by Newcastle United fans for his part in England's failure to qualify for UEFA Euro 2008, opened the scoring for the Reds and two more goals from Dirk Kuyt and Ryan Babel gave Liverpool a 3–0 win.

The team ended the month by hosting their penultimate UEFA Champions League group game, the must-win visit of Porto. Liverpool won 4–1 and, as Fernando Torres scored the first two UEFA Champions League goals of his career, captain Steven Gerrard set a personal milestone of his own by equalling Michael Owen's club record of 22 goals in the Champions League.

=== December ===
The club kicked off December by registering a 4–0 win against Bolton Wanderers at Anfield in the Premier League. This win stretched Liverpool's winning streak to five matches, during which they scored 21 goals and conceded just 1, and continued their unbeaten league run.

However, this unbeaten start to the Premier League season was cut short the following week when the visit to Reading resulted in a 3–1 defeat on 8 December. After the hosts converted a penalty for a challenge that television replays showed had occurred on the line, Steven Gerrard equalised for Liverpool before two second-half goals from Reading handed Liverpool their first Premier League defeat of the season.

Three days later, yet again needing a win to guarantee their survival in the competition, Liverpool travelled to Marseille for their final Champions League group stage fixture. Marseille had previously hosted English teams in Europe on six occasions and won all six times, and only needed a draw to progress themselves. However, Liverpool registered their second 4–0 win of the month to finish second in their group and progress to the Round of 16.

On 16 December, Liverpool hosted arch-rivals Manchester United in a vital Premier League match. The match ended with a 1–0 victory for Manchester United, their fourth in their last five league visits to Anfield, giving the latter a nine-point lead over Liverpool in the Premier League. The only goal was scored by Carlos Tevez. Arsenal beat Chelsea 1–0 later in the day to give themselves a ten-point lead over Liverpool at the top of the Premier League table.

Liverpool travelled to Chelsea for the League Cup quarter-final on 19 December. They were beaten 2–0 through a deflected goal from Frank Lampard and an injury-time goal from Andriy Shevchenko. Peter Crouch was sent-off following a two-footed tackle on Mikel John Obi.

Three days before Christmas, Liverpool hosted Portsmouth, looking to get their Premier League campaign back on track after two successive defeats. Liverpool continued a record of remaining undefeated at Anfield against Pompey since 1951 by triumphing 4–1. Fernando Torres scored twice to continue his good run of scoring, while the other goals came from Yossi Benayoun and a Sylvain Distin own goal. On 26 December, Liverpool managed a 2–1 victory over Derby County, with goals from Fernando Torres and Steven Gerrard respectively, before playing out a 0–0 draw against Manchester City at the City of Manchester Stadium in their final match of 2007.

=== January ===
Liverpool's first match of 2008 was against Wigan Athletic at Anfield, which ended in a 1–1 draw. This was followed by their first FA Cup match of the season, the third round match against Luton Town, which also finished 1–1. In the replay a week later, Liverpool beat them 5–0 at home, in which Steven Gerrard scored his second Liverpool hat-trick. On 26 January 2008, Liverpool defeated Havant & Waterlooville 5–2, despite going behind twice in the first-half. After that they travelled to Upton Park, where they faced West Ham United. An injury-time penalty from Mark Noble saw them slump to a 1–0 defeat, their third of the Premier League season.

Martin Škrtel was the first signing by Liverpool in the January transfer window. The undisclosed fee was rumoured to be £6.5 million, which was the highest amount paid by the club for a defender. Mohamed Sissoko, who had found himself playing fewer games after the arrivals of Javier Mascherano and Lucas, transferred to Juventus, and Jack Hobbs, who had played some first-team action this season, joined Scunthorpe United on loan until the end of the season.

=== February ===
Liverpool's first match of February was against Sunderland at Anfield, which finished in an 3–0 win. On 10 February, Liverpool travelled to Stamford Bridge and played out a 0–0 draw with Chelsea.

Liverpool played Barnsley in the fifth round of the FA Cup on 16 February 2008, and lost 2–1 at Anfield, but they then beat Inter Milan 2–0 on 19 February in the first-leg of their UEFA Champions League Round of 16 match. Their last match of February was against Middlesbrough on 23 February, which ended a 3–2 win for Liverpool, with Fernando Torres scoring a hat-trick.

=== March ===
Liverpool's first match in March was away against Bolton Wanderers which they won 3–1 through an own goal by Jussi Jääskeläinen and strikes from Ryan Babel and Fábio Aurélio, his first for the club. On 5 March, Liverpool played against West Ham United. Liverpool won 4–0, with a goal from Steven Gerrard and another hat-trick from Fernando Torres, making him the first Liverpool player in over 60 years to net hat-tricks in successive home matches. Three days later, Liverpool beat Newcastle United 3–0 at home, with goals from Jermaine Pennant, Fernando Torres and Steven Gerrard. On 11 March 2008, Liverpool became the second English team in a week to win at the San Siro by winning against Inter Milan 1–0, with Fernando Torres scoring the winner. Back in the Premier League, Javier Mascherano scored his first goal for Liverpool and Fernando Torres scored his 20th Premier League goal of the season, becoming the first player at the club since Robbie Fowler to do so as Liverpool won 2–1 against Reading. However, their seven match winning streak was ended when they lost 3–0 to Manchester United. Javier Mascherano was sent-off by referee Steve Bennett for dissent after Mascherano questioned the controversial booking of Fernando Torres. Liverpool's final fixture of March was against Everton at Anfield. Fernando Torres scored the only goal early in the match, and Liverpool held on to win 1–0, giving them a five-point lead over Everton for fourth place in the table.

=== April ===
On 1 April, in the Champions League, Liverpool faced Arsenal for the first of three consecutive meetings, a 1–1 draw at the Emirates Stadium with Dirk Kuyt scoring an away goal. On 5 April they drew 1–1 once again at the Emirates. Peter Crouch scored for Liverpool to take the lead but Nicklas Bendtner scored the equalizer for Arsenal, while Damien Plessis made his debut. In the third match, Liverpool beat Arsenal 4–2 (5–3 on aggregate) to reach the semi-finals of the UEFA Champions League. In the following match, Steven Gerrard scored in his 300th Liverpool appearance in the Premier League in a 3–1 home win over Blackburn Rovers. The following Saturday, Liverpool put out a weakened side against Fulham ahead of their semi-final first leg with Chelsea and won 2–0, with Jermaine Pennant and Peter Crouch getting on the scoresheet. On 22 April, Liverpool played against Chelsea at Anfield in the UEFA Champions League semi-final first leg. Liverpool looked to be going into the second-leg with a 1–0 advantage through Dirk Kuyt, but in the final minute of stoppage time John Arne Riise accidentally headed from a Salomon Kalou cross into his own net, giving Chelsea a slight advantage through the away goal. The next Saturday, against Birmingham City, Liverpool again put out a weakened side before the second-leg with Chelsea. Damien Plessis started again, and Liverpool fought back from 2–0 down to 2–2, with Peter Crouch and Yossi Benayoun scoring. That point secured fourth place for Liverpool. The next Wednesday Liverpool played against Chelsea in the second-leg of their UEFA Champions League semi-final at Stamford Bridge, but lost 3–2 in extra-time (4–3 on aggregate), sending Liverpool out of the UEFA Champions League.

=== May ===
On 4 May, Liverpool beat Manchester City 1–0 at Anfield. On the final day of the Premier League, Liverpool won 2–0 away at Tottenham Hotspur, with Andriy Voronin scoring his sixth of the season and Fernando Torres' his 24th league goal, breaking Ruud van Nistelrooy's record for the most goals scored by a foreign Premier League player in a debut season.

== Premier League ==
11 August 2007 1	Aston Villa	1–2	Liverpool	Birmingham, West Midlands
17:15 BST	Mellberg (yellow card) 26'; Bouma (yellow card) 58'; Barry (yellow card) 67', (goal) 85' (pen.); Petrov (yellow card) 89'	Report	Laursen 31' (o.g.); Pennant (yellow card) 55'; Reina (yellow card) 84'; Gerrard 87'	Stadium: Villa Park; Attendance: 42,640; Referee: Mike Riley

19 August 2007 2	Liverpool	1–1	Chelsea	Liverpool, Merseyside
16:00 BST	Torres 15'; Kuyt (yellow card) 30'; Pennant (yellow card) 40'; Gerrard (yellow card) 43'; Carragher (yellow card) 61'	Report	Essien (yellow card) 12'; A. Cole (yellow card) 59'; Ben Haim (yellow card) 63'; Lampard 62' (pen.), (yellow card) 70'; Terry (yellow card) 74'	Stadium: Anfield; Attendance: 43,924; Referee: Rob Styles

25 August 2007 3	Sunderland	0–2	Liverpool	Sunderland, Wearside
12:45 BST	Etuhu (yellow card) 27'	Report	Sissoko 37'; Arbeloa (yellow card) 67'; Voronin 87'	Stadium: Stadium of Light; Attendance: 45,645; Referee: Mark Halsey

1 September 2007 4	Liverpool	6–0	Derby County	Liverpool, Merseyside
15:00 BST	Alonso 29', 69'; Babel 45'; Torres 56', 77'; Voronin 76'	Report		Stadium: Anfield; Attendance: 44,076; Referee: Alan Wiley

15 September 2007 5	Portsmouth	0–0	Liverpool	Portsmouth, Hampshire
12:45 BST	Bouba Diop (yellow card) 29'; Johnson (yellow card) 64'; Davis (yellow card) 90+3'	Report	Alonso (yellow card) 31'; Sissoko (yellow card) 76'	Stadium: Fratton Park; Attendance: 20,388; Referee: Mike Riley

22 September 2007 6	Liverpool	0–0	Birmingham City	Liverpool, Merseyside
15:00		Report		Stadium: Anfield; Attendance: 44,215; Referee: Lee Mason

29 September 2007 7	Wigan Athletic	0–1	Liverpool	Wigan, Greater Manchester
15:00 BST		Report	Benayoun 75'	Stadium: DW Stadium; Attendance: 24,311; Referee: Mark Clattenburg

7 October 2007 8	Liverpool	2–2	Tottenham Hotspur	Liverpool, Merseyside
	Voronin 12'; Torres 90+2'	Report	Keane 45', 47'	Stadium: Anfield; Attendance: 43,986; Referee: Mark Halsey

20 October 2007 9	Everton	1–2	Liverpool	Liverpool, Merseyside
12:45	Hyypiä 37' (o.g.); Hibbert (red card) 53'; Neville (red card) 90'	Report	Kuyt 54' (pen.), 90+2' (pen.)	Stadium: Goodison Park; Attendance: 40,049; Referee: Mark Clattenburg

28 October 2007 10	Liverpool	1–1	Arsenal	Liverpool, Merseyside
16:00	Gerrard 7'	Report	Fàbregas 80'	Stadium: Anfield; Attendance: 44,122; Referee: Howard Webb

3 November 2007 11	Blackburn Rovers	0–0	Liverpool	Blackburn, Lancashire
17:15		Report		Stadium: Ewood Park; Attendance: 30,033; Referee: Martin Atkinson

10 November 2007 12	Liverpool	2–0	Fulham	Liverpool, Merseyside
17:15	Torres 81'; Gerrard 85' (pen.)	Report		Stadium: Anfield; Attendance: 43,073; Referee: Steve Tanner

24 November 2007 13	Newcastle United	0–3	Liverpool	Newcastle upon Tyne
12:45		Report	Gerrard 27'; Kuyt 46'; Babel 66'	Stadium: St. James' Park; Attendance: 52,307; Referee: Alan Wiley

2 December 2007 14	Liverpool	4–0	Bolton Wanderers	Liverpool, Merseyside
15:00	Hyypiä 17'; Torres 45'; Gerrard 56'; Babel 85'	Report		Stadium: Anfield; Attendance: 43,270; Referee: Steve Bennett

8 December 2007 15	Reading	3–1	Liverpool	Reading, Berkshire
17:15	Hunt 17' (pen.); Doyle 60'; Harper 67'	Report	Gerrard 28', (yellow card) 59'	Stadium: Madejski Stadium; Attendance: 24,022; Referee: Andre Marriner

16 December 2007 16	Liverpool	0–1	Manchester United	Liverpool, Merseyside
13:30	Gerrard (yellow card) 33'; Mascherano (yellow card) 63'	Report	Evra (yellow card) 15'; Anderson (yellow card) 33'; Brown (yellow card) 36'; Tevez 41'	Stadium: Anfield; Attendance: 44,459; Referee: Mark Halsey

22 December 2007 17	Liverpool	4–1	Portsmouth	Liverpool, Merseyside
	Benayoun 13'; Distin 16' (o.g.); Torres 66', 85'	Report	Benjani 57'	Stadium: Anfield; Attendance: 43,071

26 December 2007 18	Derby County	1–2	Liverpool	Derby, Derbyshire
	McEveley 67'	Report	Torres 11'; Gerrard 90+2'	Stadium: Pride Park Stadium; Attendance: 33,029; Referee: Alan Wiley

30 December 2007 19	Manchester City	0–0	Liverpool	Manchester, Greater Manchester
16:00 GMT		Report	Torres (yellow card) 85'	Stadium: City of Manchester Stadium; Attendance: 47,321; Referee: Uriah Rennie

2 January 2008 20	Liverpool	1–1	Wigan Athletic	Liverpool, Merseyside
	Torres 49'	Report	Bramble 80'	Stadium: Anfield; Attendance: 42,308; Referee: Steve Bennett

12 January 2008 21	Middlesbrough	1–1	Liverpool	Middlesbrough, North Yorkshire
	Boateng 26'	Report	Torres 71'	Stadium: Riverside Stadium; Attendance: 33,035; Referee: Andre Marriner

21 January 2008 22	Liverpool	2–2	Aston Villa	Liverpool, Merseyside
	Benayoun 19'; Crouch 88'	Report	Harewood 69'; Aurélio 72' (o.g.)	Stadium: Anfield; Attendance: 42,590; Referee: Mark Clattenburg

30 January 2008 23	West Ham United	1–0	Liverpool	Newham, London
	Noble 90+3' (pen.)	Report		Stadium: Upton Park; Attendance: 34,977; Referee: Alan Wiley

2 February 2008 24	Liverpool	3–0	Sunderland	Liverpool, Merseyside
	Crouch 57'; Torres 69'; Gerrard 89'	Report		Stadium: Anfield; Attendance: 43,244; Referee: Rob Styles

10 February 2008 25	Chelsea	0–0	Liverpool	Fulham, London
16:00	Belletti (yellow card) 3'; Carvalho (yellow card) 74'; Alex (yellow card) 78'	Report	Babel (yellow card) 41'; Riise (yellow card) 63'	Stadium: Stamford Bridge; Attendance: 41,788; Referee: Mike Riley

23 February 2008 26	Liverpool	3–2	Middlesbrough	Liverpool, Merseyside
	Torres 28', 29', 61'	Report	Tuncay 9'; Downing 83'	Stadium: Anfield; Attendance: 43,612; Referee: Lee Mason

2 March 2008 27	Bolton Wanderers	1–3	Liverpool	Bolton, Greater Manchester
	Cohen 79'	Report	Jääskeläinen 12' (o.g.); Babel 60'; Aurélio 75'	Stadium: Reebok Stadium; Attendance: 24,004; Referee: Phil Dowd

5 March 2008 28	Liverpool	4–0	West Ham United	Liverpool, Merseyside
	Torres 8', 60', 81'; Gerrard 85'	Report		Stadium: Anfield; Attendance: 42,954; Referee: Steve Bennett

8 March 2008 29	Liverpool	3–0	Newcastle United	Liverpool, Merseyside
	Pennant 43'; Torres 45'; Gerrard 51'	Report		Stadium: Anfield; Attendance: 44,031; Referee: Peter Walton

15 March 2008 30	Liverpool	2–1	Reading	Liverpool, Merseyside
	Mascherano 19'; Torres 48'	Report	Matějovský 5'	Stadium: Anfield; Attendance: 43,524; Referee: Andre Marriner

23 March 2008 31	Manchester United	3–0	Liverpool	Trafford, Greater Manchester
13:30 GMT	Brown 34'; Ferdinand (yellow card) 60'; Ronaldo 78'; Nani 81'	Report	Mascherano (yellow card) 11' (yellow-red card) 44'; Torres (yellow card) 44'; Arbeloa (yellow card) 53'	Stadium: Old Trafford; Attendance: 76,000; Referee: Steve Bennett

30 March 2008 32	Liverpool	1–0	Everton	Liverpool, Merseyside
16:00	Torres 7'	Report		Stadium: Anfield; Attendance: 44,295; Referee: Howard Webb

5 April 2008 33	Arsenal	1–1	Liverpool	Islington, London
12:45	Bendtner 54'	Report	Crouch 41'	Stadium: Emirates Stadium; Attendance: 60,111; Referee: Phil Dowd

13 April 2008 34	Liverpool	3–1	Blackburn Rovers	Liverpool, Merseyside
13:30	Gerrard 60'; Torres 82'; Voronin 90'	Report	Santa Cruz 90+2'	Stadium: Anfield; Attendance: 43,283; Referee: Alan Wiley

19 April 2008 35	Fulham	0–2	Liverpool	Fulham, London
		Report	Pennant 17'; Crouch 70'	Stadium: Craven Cottage; Attendance: 25,311; Referee: Martin Atkinson

26 April 2008 36	Birmingham City	2–2	Liverpool	Birmingham, West Midlands
	Forssell 33'; Larsson 35'	Report	Crouch 63'; Benayoun 75'	Stadium: St Andrew's; Attendance: 29,252; Referee: Peter Walton

4 May 2008 37	Liverpool	1–0	Manchester City	Liverpool, Merseyside
16:00	Torres 58'	Report		Stadium: Anfield; Attendance: 43,074; Referee: Mark Halsey

11 May 2008 38	Tottenham Hotspur	0–2	Liverpool	Haringey, London
15:00		Report	Voronin 69'; Torres 74'	Stadium: White Hart Lane; Attendance: 36,063; Referee: Uriah Rennie

=== Classification ===
Pos	Team	Pld	W	D	L	GF	GA	GD	Pts	Qualification or relegation
2	Chelsea	38	25	10	3	65	26	+39	85	Qualification for the Champions League group stage
3	Arsenal	38	24	11	3	74	31	+43	83	Qualification for the Champions League third qualifying round
4	Liverpool	38	21	13	4	67	28	+39	76	Qualification for the Champions League third qualifying round
5	Everton	38	19	8	11	55	33	+22	65	Qualification for the UEFA Cup first round
6	Aston Villa	38	16	12	10	71	51	+20	60	Qualification for the Intertoto Cup third round

Source: Barclays Premier League
Rules for classification: 1) points; 2) goal difference; 3) number of goals scored.
For further information on European qualification see Premier League – Competition

=== Results by round ===
Round	1	2	3	4	5	6	7	8	9	10	11	12	13	14	15	16	17	18	19	20	21	22	23	24	25	26	27	28	29	30	31	32	33	34	35	36	37	38
Ground	A	H	A	H	A	H	A	H	A	H	A	H	A	H	A	H	H	A	A	H	A	H	A	H	A	H	A	H	H	H	A	H	A	H	A	A	H	A
Result	W	D	W	W	D	D	W	D	W	D	D	W	W	W	L	L	W	W	D	D	D	D	L	W	D	W	W	W	W	W	L	W	D	W	W	D	W	W
Position	5	9	4	1	2	3	4	4	4	6	7	4	5	3	4	5	5	4	4	5	4	5	7	5	5	4	5	4	4	4	4	4	4	4	4	4	4	4

Source: Game log
A = Away; H = Home; W = Win; D = Draw; L = Loss

=== Results summary ===
Overall								Home						Away					
Pld	W	D	L	GF	GA	GD	Pts	W	D	L	GF	GA	GD	W	D	L	GF	GA	GD
38	21	13	4	67	28	+39	76	12	6	1	43	13	+30	9	7	3	24	15	+9

=== Big Four Games ===
Overall								Home						Away					
Pld	W	D	L	GF	GA	GD	Pts	W	D	L	GF	GA	GD	W	D	L	GF	GA	GD
6	0	4	2	3	7	−4	4	0	2	1	2	3	−1	0	2	1	1	4	−3

== Cup Competitions ==
=== Football League Cup ===
25 September 2007 Third Round	Reading	2–4	Liverpool	Reading, Berkshire
19:45	Convey 28'; Halls 64'	Report	Benayoun 23'; Torres 50', 71', 86'	Stadium: Madejski Stadium; Attendance: 23,567

31 October 2007 Fourth Round	Liverpool	2–1	Cardiff City	Liverpool
19:45	El Zhar 48'; Gerrard 66'	Report	Purse 65'	Stadium: Anfield; Attendance: 41,780

19 December 2007 Fifth Round	Chelsea	2–0	Liverpool	Fulham, London
19:45	Lampard 59'; Shevchenko 90'	Report		Stadium: Stamford Bridge; Attendance: 41,366; Referee: Martin Atkinson

=== FA Cup ===
6 January 2008 Third Round	Luton Town	1–1	Liverpool	Luton
16:00	Riise 76' (o.g.)	Report	Crouch 73'	Stadium: Kenilworth Road; Attendance: 10,226

15 January 2008 Third Round Replay	Liverpool	5–0	Luton Town	Liverpool
20:00	Babel 45'; Gerrard 52', 64', 71'; Hyypiä 57'	Report		Stadium: Anfield; Attendance: 41,446

26 January 2008 Fourth Round	Liverpool	5–2	Havant & Waterlooville	Liverpool
15:00	Lucas 27'; Benayoun 44', 56', 59'; Crouch 90'	Report	Pacquette 9'; Škrtel 31' (o.g.)	Stadium: Anfield; Attendance: 42,566; Referee: Phil Dowd

16 February 2008 Fifth Round	Liverpool	1–2	Barnsley	Liverpool
15:00	Kuyt 32'	Report	Foster 57'; Howard 90'	Stadium: Anfield; Attendance: 42,449; Referee: Martin Atkinson

== UEFA Champions League ==
=== Third qualifying round ===
15 August 2007 First leg	Toulouse (France)	0–1	(England) Liverpool	Toulouse, France
		Report	Voronin 43'	Stadium: Stadium Municipal; Attendance: 36,000; Referee: Kyros Vassaras (Greece)

28 August 2007 Second leg	Liverpool (England)	4–0	(France) Toulouse	Liverpool, England
	Crouch 19'; Hyypiä 49'; Kuyt 87', 90+1'	Report		Stadium: Anfield; Attendance: 43,118; Referee: Wolfgang Stark (Germany)

=== Group stage ===
Group A
Team	Pld	W	D	L	GF	GA	GD	Pts
(Portugal) Porto	6	3	2	1	8	7	+1	11
(England) Liverpool	6	3	1	2	18	5	+13	10
(France) Marseille	6	2	1	3	6	9	−3	7
(Turkey) Beşiktaş	6	2	0	4	4	15	−11	6

18 September 2007 1	Porto (Portugal)	1–1	(England) Liverpool	Porto, Portugal
20:45	L. González 8' (pen.)	Report	Kuyt 17'; Pennant (red card)	Stadium: Estádio do Dragão; Attendance: 41,208; Referee: Ľuboš Micheľ (Slovakia)

3 October 2007 2	Liverpool (England)	0–1	(France) Marseille	Liverpool, England
20:45		Report	Valbuena 77'	Stadium: Anfield; Attendance: 41,355; Referee: Konrad Plautz (Austria)

24 October 2007 3	Beşiktaş (Turkey)	2–1	(England) Liverpool	Istanbul, Turkey
20:45	Hyypiä 13' (o.g.); Bobô 82'	Report	Gerrard 85'	Stadium: BJK İnönü Stadium; Attendance: 32,500; Referee: Claus Bo Larsen (Denmark)

6 November 2007 4	Liverpool (England)	8–0	(Turkey) Beşiktaş	Liverpool, England
20:45	Crouch 19', 89'; Benayoun 32', 53', 56'; Gerrard 69'; Babel 78', 81'	Report		Stadium: Anfield; Attendance: 41,143; Referee: Markus Merk (Germany)

28 November 2007 5	Liverpool (England)	4–1	(Portugal) Porto	Liverpool, England
20:45	Torres 19', 78'; Gerrard 84' (pen.); Crouch 87'	Report	López 33'	Stadium: Anfield; Attendance: 41,095; Referee: Roberto Rosetti (Italy)

11 December 2007 6	Marseille (France)	0–4	(England) Liverpool	Marseille, France
20:45		Report	Gerrard 4'; Torres 11'; Kuyt 48'; Babel 90+1'	Stadium: Stade Vélodrome; Attendance: 53,000; Referee: Terje Hauge (Norway)

=== Knockout phase ===
==== Round of 16 ====
19 February 2008 First leg	Liverpool (England)	2–0	(Italy) Inter Milan	Liverpool, England
	Kuyt 85'; Gerrard 90'	Report	Materazzi (red card) 30'	Stadium: Anfield; Attendance: 41,999; Referee: Frank De Bleeckere (Belgium)

11 March 2008 Second leg	Inter Milan (Italy)	0–1	(England) Liverpool	Milan, Italy
	Burdisso (red card) 50'	Report	Torres 63'	Stadium: San Siro; Attendance: 80,000; Referee: Tom Henning Øvrebø (Norway)

==== Quarter-finals ====
2 April 2008 First leg	Arsenal (England)	1–1	(England) Liverpool	London, England
	Adebayor 23'	Report	Kuyt 26'	Stadium: Emirates Stadium; Attendance: 60,041; Referee: Pieter Vink (Netherlands)

8 April 2008 Second leg	Liverpool (England)	4–2	(England) Arsenal	Liverpool, England
	Hyypiä 30'; Torres 69'; Gerrard 86' (pen.); Babel 90+2'	Report	Diaby 13'; Adebayor 84'	Stadium: Anfield; Attendance: 41,985; Referee: Peter Frojdfeldt (Sweden)

==== Semi-finals ====
22 April 2008 First leg	Liverpool (England)	1–1	(England) Chelsea	Liverpool, England
	Kuyt 43'	Report	Riise 90+4' (o.g.)	Stadium: Anfield; Attendance: 42,180; Referee: Konrad Plautz (Austria)

30 April 2008 Second leg	Chelsea (England)	3–2 (a.e.t.)	(England) Liverpool	London, England
	Drogba 33', 105'; Lampard 98' (pen.)	Report	Torres 64'; Babel 117'	Stadium: Stamford Bridge; Attendance: 38,900; Referee: Roberto Rosetti (Italy)

== Top scorers ==
P	Player	Position	Premier League	FA Cup	League Cup	UEFA Champions League	Total
1	(Spain) Fernando Torres	Forward	24	0	3	6	33
2	(England) Steven Gerrard	Midfielder	11	3	1	6	21
3	(Israel) Yossi Benayoun	Midfielder	4	3	1	3	11
3	(England) Peter Crouch	Forward	5	2	0	4	11
3	(Netherlands) Dirk Kuyt	Forward	3	1	0	7	11
6	(Netherlands) Ryan Babel	Forward	4	1	0	5	10
7	(Ukraine) Andriy Voronin	Forward	5	0	0	1	6
8	(Finland) Sami Hyypiä	Defender	1	1	0	2	4
9	(Spain) Xabi Alonso	Midfielder	2	0	0	0	2
9	(England) Jermaine Pennant	Midfielder	2	0	0	0	2
11	(Brazil) Fábio Aurélio	Defender	1	0	0	0	1
11	(Argentina) Javier Mascherano	Midfielder	1	0	0	0	1
11	(Brazil) Lucas	Midfielder	0	1	0	0	1
11	(Mali) Mohamed Sissoko	Midfielder	1	0	0	0	1
11	(Morocco) Nabil El Zhar	Forward	0	0	1	0	1

=== Disciplinary record ===
N	Pos.	Nat.	Name	Yellow card	Second yellow card	Red card	Notes
20	MF	(Argentina)	Javier Mascherano	7	1	0	
23	DF	(England)	Jamie Carragher	7	0	0	
14	MF	(Spain)	Xabi Alonso	7	0	0	
9	FW	(Spain)	Fernando Torres	6	0	0	
8	MF	(England)	Steven Gerrard	5	0	0	
17	DF	(Spain)	Álvaro Arbeloa	5	0	0	
16	MF	(England)	Jermaine Pennant	4	1	0	
22	MF	(Mali)	Mohamed Sissoko	4	0	0	
4	DF	(Finland)	Sami Hyypiä	4	0	0	
6	DF	(Norway)	John Arne Riise	4	0	0	
18	FW	(Netherlands)	Dirk Kuyt	3	0	0	
21	MF	(Brazil)	Lucas	3	0	0	
19	FW	(Netherlands)	Ryan Babel	3	0	0	
12	DF	(Brazil)	Fábio Aurélio	3	0	0	
25	GK	(Spain)	Pepe Reina	2	0	0	
10	FW	(Ukraine)	Andriy Voronin	2	0	0	
3	DF	(Republic of Ireland)	Steve Finnan	2	0	0	
11	MF	(Israel)	Yossi Benayoun	1	0	0	
37	DF	(Slovakia)	Martin Škrtel	1	0	0	
48	DF	(Argentina)	Emiliano Insúa	1	0	0	
15	FW	(England)	Peter Crouch	0	0	1	

Last updated: 11 May 2008
Source: Match reports in Game Log
Only competitive matches
(yellow card) = Number of bookings; (second yellow card) = Number of sending offs after a second yellow card; (red card) = Number of sending offs by a direct red card.

== Squad statistics ==
Last updated on 11 May 2008

No.	Pos	Nat	Player	Total		Premier League		Champions League		FA Cup		League Cup	
No.	Pos	Nat	Player	Apps	Goals	Apps	Goals	Apps	Goals	Apps	Goals	Apps	Goals
3	DF	(Republic of Ireland) IRL	Steve Finnan	35	0	21+3	0	6+1	0	3	0	1	0
4	DF	(Finland) FIN	Sami Hyypiä	44	4	24+3	1	12+1	2	4	1	0	0
5	DF	(Denmark) DEN	Daniel Agger	6	0	4+1	0	1	0	0	0	0	0
6	DF	(Norway) NOR	John Arne Riise	44	0	22+7	0	5+5	0	4	0	0+1	0
7	MF	(Australia) AUS	Harry Kewell	15	0	8+2	0	1+2	0	0+1	0	0+1	0
8	MF	(England) ENG	Steven Gerrard	52	21	32+2	11	13	6	1+2	3	2	1
9	FW	(Spain) ESP	Fernando Torres	46	33	29+4	24	10+1	6	1	0	1	3
10	FW	(Ukraine) UKR	Andriy Voronin	28	6	13+6	5	4+3	1	0+1	0	1	0
11	MF	(Israel) ISR	Yossi Benayoun	47	11	15+15	4	7+4	3	3	3	1+2	1
12	DF	(Brazil) BRA	Fábio Aurélio	29	1	13+3	1	7+2	0	0+1	0	3	0
14	MF	(Spain) ESP	Xabi Alonso	27	2	16+3	2	4	0	3	0	1	0
15	FW	(England) ENG	Peter Crouch	36	11	9+12	5	5+3	4	4	2	3	0
16	MF	(England) ENG	Jermaine Pennant	25	2	14+4	2	2+3	0	2	0	0	0
17	DF	(Spain) ESP	Álvaro Arbeloa	41	0	26+2	0	8+1	0	1	0	3	0
18	FW	(Netherlands) NED	Dirk Kuyt	48	11	24+8	3	10+2	7	2+2	1	0	0
19	FW	(Netherlands) NED	Ryan Babel	49	10	15+15	4	8+5	5	4	1	2	0
20	MF	(Argentina) ARG	Javier Mascherano	41	1	25	1	13	0	1+1	0	0+1	0
21	MF	(Brazil) BRA	Lucas	32	1	12+6	0	2+5	0	3+1	1	3	0
22	MF	(Mali) MLI	Mohamed Sissoko	14	1	6+3	1	2+1	0	0	0	2	0
23	DF	(England) ENG	Jamie Carragher	55	0	34+1	0	13	0	3+1	0	3	0
25	GK	(Spain) ESP	Pepe Reina	52	0	38	0	14	0	0	0	0	0
30	GK	(France) FRA	Charles Itandje	7	0	0	0	0	0	4	0	3	0
33	MF	(Argentina) ARG	Sebastián Leto	4	0	0	0	2	0	0	0	2	0
37	DF	(Slovakia) SVK	Martin Škrtel	20	0	13+1	0	5	0	1	0	0	0
42	FW	(Morocco) MAR	Nabil El Zhar	3	1	0	0	0	0	0+1	0	1+1	1
46	DF	(England) ENG	Jack Hobbs	5	0	1+1	0	0	0	0	0	2+1	0
47	MF	(France) FRA	Damien Plessis	2	0	2	0	0	0	0	0	0	0
48	DF	(Argentina) ARG	Emiliano Insúa	3	0	2+1	0	0	0	0	0	0	0

== Transfers ==
=== In ===
#	Player	From	Fee	When
9	(Spain) Fernando Torres	(Spain) Atlético Madrid	£27,200,000	4 July 2007
10	(Ukraine) Andriy Voronin	(Germany) Bayer Leverkusen	Free	6 July 2007
11	(Israel) Yossi Benayoun	(England) West Ham United	£5,300,000	12 July 2007
19	(Netherlands) Ryan Babel	(Netherlands) Ajax	£11,500,000	13 July 2007
20	(Argentina) Javier Mascherano	(England) West Ham United	£18,600,000	Summer
21	(Brazil) Lucas	(Brazil) Grêmio	£6,300,000	Summer
30	(France) Charles Itandje	(France) Lens	£1,400,000	Summer
33	(Argentina) Sebastián Leto	(Argentina) Lanús	£1,800,000	Summer
47	(France) Damien Plessis	(France) Lyon	£2,500,000	Summer
37	(Slovakia) Martin Škrtel	(Russia) Zenit Saint Petersburg	£6,500,000	Winter

=== Out ===
#	Player	To	Fee	When
1	(Poland) Jerzy Dudek	(Spain) Real Madrid	Free	Summer
9	(England) Robbie Fowler	(Wales) Cardiff City	Free	Summer
10	(Spain) Luis García	(Spain) Atlético Madrid	£4,100,000	Summer
11	(Chile) Mark González (Note: González was born in Durban, South Africa, but was raised in Chile from the age of 10 and made his international debut for Chile in 2003.)	(Spain) Real Betis	£4,000,000	Summer
17	(Wales) Craig Bellamy	(England) West Ham United	£7,500,000	Summer
24	(France) Djibril Cissé	(France) Marseille	£6,550,000	Summer
29	(Argentina) Gabriel Paletta (Note: Paletta was born in Buenos Aires, Argentina, and represented them at U-20 level, but also holds an Italian passport due to his great-grandfather originating from Italy, and would make his international debut for Italy in June 2014.)	(Argentina) Boca Juniors	£1,200,000	Summer
30	(Italy) Daniele Padelli	(Italy) Sampdoria	Loan return	Summer
32	(Netherlands) Boudewijn Zenden	(France) Marseille	Free	Summer
	(England) Paul Barratt	(England) Worcester City	Free	Summer
	(England) David Roberts	(Wales) Bangor City	Free	Summer
	(France) Florent Sinama Pongolle	(Spain) Recreativo Huelva	£2,700,000	Summer
	(England) Danny O'Donnell	(England) Crewe Alexandra	£100,000	Summer
	(England) Ryan Wignall	(England) Vauxhall Motors	Released	Summer
	(England) Lee Woodward	Unknown	Released	Summer
	(England) Jon Pringle	(England) West Bromwich Albion	Free	Summer
	(England) Stephen Behan	Unknown	Free	Summer
	(England) Michael Burns	(England) Bolton Wanderers	Free	Summer
	(England) Jon Routledge	(England) Tottenham Hotspur	Free	Summer
	(England) Charlie Barnett	(England) Tranmere Rovers	Free	Summer
	(Republic of Ireland) Laurence Gaughan	(Scotland) Celtic	£200,000	Summer
45	(England) James Smith	(England) Stockport County	£450,000	Winter
	(Republic of Ireland) Jimmy Ryan (Note: Ryan was born in Liverpool, England, but also qualifies to represent the Republic of Ireland internationally and has represented them at U-21 level.)	(England) Shrewsbury Town	Undisclosed	Winter
22	(Mali) Mohamed Sissoko	(Italy) Juventus	£8,250,000	Winter
	(England) Josh Mimms	(England) York City	Free	Winter
	(England) Lee Peltier	(England) Yeovil Town	£200,000	Winter

=== Loaned out ===
#	Player	To	Duration
26	(England) Paul Anderson	(Wales) Swansea City	Season
26	(England) Scott Carson	(England) Aston Villa	Full Season
34	(Spain) Miki Roque	(Spain) Xerez	Season
35	(England) Danny Guthrie	(England) Bolton Wanderers	Full Season
36	(Scotland) Ryan Flynn	(England) Hereford United	November to December
36	(England) Adam Hammill	(England) Southampton	Season
37	(England) Lee Peltier	(England) Yeovil Town	July to December
38	(England) Craig Lindfield	(England) Notts County	November
38	(England) Craig Lindfield	(England) Chester City	January to February
41	(Austria) Besian Idrizaj	(England) Crystal Palace	August to November
41	(Austria) Besian Idrizaj	(Austria) Wacker Innsbruck	February to June
44	(England) Robbie Threlfall	(England) Hereford United	November to May
45	(England) James Smith	(England) Stockport County	August to November
46	(England) Jack Hobbs	(England) Scunthorpe United	January to May
	(Republic of Ireland) Jimmy Ryan	(England) Shrewsbury Town	August to November
	(England) Josh Mimms	(England) York City	October to December
	(Spain) Godwin Antwi (Note: Antwi was born in Kumasi, Ghana, but was raised in Spain from the age of 14 and represented them at U-19 level.)	(England) Hartlepool United	Season
	(Bulgaria) Nikolay Mihaylov	(Netherlands) FC Twente	23 August 2007
	(France) Anthony Le Tallec	(France) Le Mans	Season
	(Spain) Aridane Hernández	(Spain) Fuerteventura	Season

- In: ▲£29,950,000+
- Out: ▼£64,200,000+
- Total spending: ▼£34,250,000+

== Reserves and U-18s ==
=== Summary ===
The reserves side were crowned champions of the Barclays Premier Reserve League North this season on 7 April 2008, the 17th reserve league title for the club. They became National Champions after beating Southern Champions Aston Villa Reserves 3–0 in the Premier Reserve League Play-off Final at Anfield on 7 May 2008. The reserves also reached the finals of the Liverpool Senior Cup and the Lancashire Senior Cup, and won the international football tournament Dallas Cup. Krisztián Németh, who scored 9 goals in 12 matches, was the top scorer in the Premier Reserve League North. The under-18s finished fifth in the Premier Academy League and qualified for the last 16 in FA Youth Cup. Nathan Eccleston was the best scorer in the youth team with 18 goals.

=== New players ===
After the departure of Steve Heighway, Dutchman Piet Hamberg came in to run the academy. As well as some changes to background personnel, the reserve and youth sides were bolstered by several new players:

Player	From	When
(Hungary) András Simon	MTK Hungária	Summer
(Hungary) Krisztián Németh	MTK Hungária	Summer
(Hungary) Péter Gulácsi	MTK Hungária	Summer
(Spain) Gerardo Bruna (Note: Bruna was born in Mendoza, Argentina, but was raised in Spain and represented them at U-17 level before switching his international allegiance back to Argentina and representing them at U20 level.)	Real Madrid	Summer
(Spain) Mikel San José	Athletic Bilbao	Summer
(Spain) Dani Pacheco	Barcelona	Summer
(Spain) Daniel Ayala	Sevilla	Summer
(Spain) Aridane Hernández	Real Madrid	Summer
(Germany) Marvin Pourié	Borussia Dortmund	Summer
(Bulgaria) Nikolay Mihaylov	Levski Sofia	Summer
(Sweden) Alexander Kačaniklić	Helsingborgs IF	Summer
(Finland) Lauri Dalla Valle	JIPPO	Winter
(Switzerland) Pajtim Kasami	Grasshopper	Winter

Player	From	When
(Greece) Dean Bouzanis (Note: Bouzanis was born in Sydney, Australia, and represented them at U-17 level, but also qualified to represent Greece internationally and represented them at U-19 level before switching his international allegiance back to Australia and representing them at U-20 and U-23 level.)	Sydney FC (loan return)	Summer
(Scotland) Gary Mackay-Steven	Ross County	Summer
(Scotland) Alex Cooper	Ross County	Winter
(England) Ryan Crowther	Stockport County	Summer
(England) Ben Robinson	Stockport County	Summer
(England) David Amoo	Millwall	Summer
(England) Andre Wisdom	Bradford City	Winter
(England) Nathan Eccleston	U-16s	Summer
(England) Sean Highdale	U-16s	Summer
(England) Steven Irwin	U-16s	Summer
(England) Joe Kennedy	U-16s	Summer
(Republic of Ireland) Chris Oldfield	U-16s	Summer

=== Players this season ===
==== Reserves ====
Note: Flags indicate national team as defined under FIFA eligibility rules; some limited exceptions apply. Players may hold more than one non-FIFA nationality.

No.	Pos.	Nation	Player
40	GK	ENG	David Martin
—	GK	AUS	Dean Bouzanis
—	GK	HUN	Péter Gulácsi (on loan from MTK Hungária)
39	DF	ENG	Stephen Darby (captain)
44	DF	ENG	Robbie Threlfall (to November)
45	DF	ESP	Mikel San José
46	DF	ENG	Jack Hobbs (to January)
48	DF	ARG	Emiliano Insúa
—	DF	PAR	Ronald Huth
—	DF	ESP	Daniel Ayala
—	DF	ENG	Martin Kelly
33	MF	ARG	Sebastián Leto
34	MF	ENG	Jay Spearing

No.	Pos.	Nation	Player
35	MF	ENG	Ray Putterill
36	MF	SCO	Ryan Flynn
42	MF	MAR	Nabil El Zhar
47	MF	FRA	Damien Plessis
—	MF	ENG	Ryan Crowther
—	MF	ESP	Francisco Durán
—	MF	ARG	Gerardo Bruna
38	FW	ENG	Craig Lindfield
—	FW	NED	Jordy Brouwer
—	FW	HUN	Krisztián Németh
—	FW	HUN	András Simon
—	FW	ESP	Dani Pacheco

- Squad numbers refer to players' first team squad number where applicable. Reserve and youth games are 1–11.

==== Under-18s ====
Year	Name	Pos	Nat	Profile
2nd	Martin Hansen	GK	(Denmark)	View
1st	Chris Oldfield	GK	(Republic of Ireland)	View
2nd	Mattone Awang	DF/MF	(England)	View
2nd	Shane O'Connor	DF/MF	(Republic of Ireland)	View
1st	Joe Kennedy	DF	(England)	View
1st	Steven Irwin (captain)	DF/MF	(England)	View
2nd	Astrit Ajdarević	MF	(Sweden) (Note: Ajdarević was born in Pristina, Yugoslavia (now part of Kosovo, but part of Serbia during the 2007–08 season), but was raised in Sweden from the age of 2 and represented them at U-17, U-19, U-21, and U-23 level. He also qualified to represent Albania internationally through his parents and would make his international debut for Albania in November 2017.)	View
2nd	Ben Parsonage	MF	(England)	View
2nd	Gary Mackay-Steven	MF/DF	(Scotland)	View

Year	Name	Pos	Nat	Profile
1st	Sean Highdale	MF	(England)	View
1st	Alexander Kačaniklić	MF	(Sweden)	View
1st	Alex Cooper	MF	(Scotland)	View
1st	David Amoo	MF/FW	(England)	View
2nd	Michael Collins	FW	(Republic of Ireland)	View
2nd	Michael Scott	FW/DF	(England)	View
1st	Nathan Eccleston	FW/MF	(England)	View
1st	Marvin Pourie	FW	(Germany)	View

== Records ==
- Mohamed Sissoko's goal against Sunderland was not only his first (and only) goal for the club but also Liverpool's 7000th league goal.
- The 6–0 win against Derby County was the first time Liverpool had scored six in the league since 26 April 2003, against West Bromwich Albion.
- The 8–0 win over Beşiktaş was the biggest ever win in the UEFA Champions League, surpassing two previous 7–0 victories by Juventus and Arsenal.
- The 4–0 win against Marseille was Liverpool's biggest away win in UEFA Champions League.
- The 2–0 win at Anfield against Inter Milan was Liverpool's 100th win at Anfield in all European competitions.
- Liverpool scored a hat-trick in every competition they played in this season.
- Liverpool were the first Premier League club to score 100 goals in all competitions.
