= Ronald Huth =

Paraguayan footballer (born 1989)

Personal information
- Full name: Ronald Renato Huth Candia
- Date of birth: 30 October 1989 (age 37)
- Place of birth: Asunción, Paraguay
- Height: 1.89 m (6 ft 2 in)
- Position: Left back

Team information
- Current team: Rubio Ñu

Youth career
- 1999–2007: Tacuary
- 2007–2009: Liverpool

Senior career*
Years	Team	Apps	(Gls)
2008–2009	Liverpool	0	(0)
2009–2011	Tacuary	29	(2)
2009–2010	→ Vicenza (loan)	3	(0)
2011	→ PAS Giannina (loan)	0	(0)
2012	Sportivo Luqueño	7	(0)
2012–2015	Tacuary	11	(0)
2013–2014	→ Olimpia Asunción (loan)	11	(0)
2015	Blooming	16	(0)
2017	Nacional Asunción	2	(1)
2017–2019	Sarmiento Resistencia	51	(3)
2019–2020	Boca Unidos	8	(0)
2021–	Rubio Ñu	--	(--)

International career
2008–2009	Paraguay U20	11	(0)
2011	Paraguay	1	(0)
- * Club domestic league appearances and goals as of 02:44, 2 November 2019 (UTC)

Ronald Renato Huth Candia (born 30 October 1989) is a Paraguayan football defender of Italian descent, who plays for Rubio Ñu in the Paraguayan División Intermedia. Huth holds Italian citizenship.

== Career ==
=== Early career ===
At the age of 11, Huth joined Tacuary. In 2004, Huth was in Tacuary's under-14 squad, coached by Ruben Ayala. In 2005, Huth appeared for Tacuary's U20 squad. In October 2005, Huth played again for Tacuary's under-20 team, which was coached by Julian Ferreira. Whilst in Tacuary's reserve squad, Huth was also a substitute for the first-team. In 2006, Huth again played for Tacuary's under-20 team, being coached by Vicente Quinto. In 2006, a Tacuary youth team toured internationally, including in a tournament in Ibiza in Spain, Liverpool scouts remained impressed by Huth. Videos reached Liverpool manager, Rafael Benítez, who ordered the signing of the player. Huth and seven others were taking by Liverpool scouts to trial for two weeks.

=== Liverpool ===
==== 2006–07 season ====
On 31 January 2007, Huth joined Liverpool for an undisclosed fee. Liverpool bought 75% of Huth's transfer rights from Tacuary. On 2 February 2007, it was reported that Huth had signed a two-and-a-half-year contract with Liverpool's Academy. Huth became the first Paraguayan to join Liverpool FC, and was coached by Gary Ablett. Huth himself stated that his career highlight was the moment when he signed for the club, and was soon after put up to live with a local family which aided him to learn English faster. Rafael Benítez observed Huth with attention, but recommended that he play with the reserve-team since he had five players as Huth, such as Jamie Carragher, Daniel Agger and Sami Hyypia. Being part of the Liverpool U18 and reserve squad, he joined players such as Astrit Ajdarević, András Simon, Zsolt Poloskei, Péter Gulácsi and Adam Hammill, as well as South Americans Sebastián Leto, Emiliano Insúa, Lucas and Gabriel Paletta. Huth played in a 4–1 victory against Blackburn Rovers on 22 March 2007, where he was substituted onto the field in the 60th minute for Fábio Aurélio. In the same fixture, Liverpool's reserve-team also featured big name players such as Robbie Fowler, Boudewijn Zenden, Jermaine Pennant, Javier Mascherano, Gabriel Paletta, Emiliano Insúa, Álvaro Arbeloa and Jerzy Dudek. Huth would play for Liverpool's reserve team for the second half of the 2006–07 FA Premier Reserve League, which saw Liverpool finish in fifth position of the Reserve League North table with 26 points. Huth was in the starting line in all of Liverpool's games in their reserve championship winning team. In May 2007, Huth figured between players within the Liverpool first-team.

==== 2007–08 season ====
On 25 October 2007, Huth played a full 90 minutes in a Premier Reserve League 2–1 win against Newcastle United in which Harry Kewell also featured for Liverpool. Huth was part of Liverpool's reserve team which were crowned champions of the Premier Reserve League North during the 2007–08 Premier Reserve League season, with a total of 43 points and sitting 13 points clear of their nearest rivals, Manchester City. Liverpool had the longest winning streak with seven matches from 26 February–7 May, and also held the longest unbeaten run with 16 matches from 11 October–7 May. The 2007–08 Premier Reserve League also saw Liverpool's reserve team attract the highest attendance of 10,546 in a fixture against Manchester United on 26 February. Huth, wearing the number #5 shirt, then took part in the Play-off Final against Aston Villa, who had been crowned champions of the Premier Reserve League South, respectively. The final was played no 7 May 2008 at Anfield with an attendance of 7,580 as Liverpool won the fixture 4–0. Reserve-team coach Gary Ablett said of Huth, "Ronald has done exceptionally well and we are really pleased with the progress he is making. He is a young lad and he will get more chances as the season goes on." During the 2007–08 season, Huth made 14 Premier Reserve League appearances, scoring one goal, and also made six cup appearances.

==== 2008–09 season ====
During a pre-season friendly against Scotland's Hamilton Academical on 20 August 2008, Huth would go on to score in the 2–1 away victory at New Douglas Park. Liverpool U18 finished runners-up of the 2008–09 FA Youth Cup, however, Huth would take no part in the squad as did his reserve-team colleagues Dean Bouzanis, Daniel Ayala, Nathan Eccleston, David Amoo and Tom Ince. On 3 November 2008, Huth played a full 90 minutes of a 2–1 home loss against Manchester City in the Premier Reserve League. The result was Liverpool's fourth consecutive loss, which despite not posing any attacking threat they went close when Huth himself played through his team-mate Jordy Brouwer whose shot eventually went straight at the goal keeper. Liverpool concluded the 2008–09 Premier Reserve League season in seventh position of the Premier Reserve League North with a total of 22 points. The reserve-team again attracted the highest attendance for the season with a total of 3,955 spectators in a fixture against Manchester United on 12 March 2009. Huth had made 8 league appearances for Liverpool in the Premier Reserve League and had also made 2 appearances in the 2007–08 Liverpool Senior Cup. He also made one appearance in the 2007–08 Lancashire Senior Cup in a 3–2 loss against Manchester United on 30 July 2008. At the time of renewing his contract with Liverpool, Huth had problems with the representative who managed him. On 16 June 2009, it was reported that Liverpool had released Huth alongside Godwin Antwi, Gary MacKay-Steven and the late Miki Roqué. Huth's contract had subsequently expired and was not renewed.

=== Tacuary ===
Following the expiration of his contract at Liverpool, Huth returned to Tacuary.

==== Vicenza (loan) ====
Huth was loaned to Italian Serie B side Vicenza in July 2009, from Tacuary, along with Cirilo Mora. He played for Vicenza's Primavera Team as overage player and occasionally as unused bench at first team. On 20 February 2010, he played his first team debut against Gallipoli, substituted Antonio Giosa after Vicenza scored 5th goal of the match. The match Vicenza defeated Gallipoli in 5–0.

==== 2010 season ====
In July 2010, Huth was red carded in a loss against Libertad.

==== 2011 season ====
In January 2011, Huth participated with Tacuary in preparation games in Uruguay, including a game against Nacional de Montevideo. In April 2011, Huth scored in a 1–0 victory against Rubio Ñu when it was coached by Francisco Arce.

=== PAS Giannina ===
Huth signed for newly promoted Super League Greece side PAS Giannina on a season-long loan deal in July 2011.

==== Olimpia (loan) ====
In July 2013, Huth joined Olimpia on a 12-month loan contract from Tacuary.

=== Blooming ===
In July 2015, Huth signed a one-year contract with Bolivian first division club Blooming. On 12 August 2015 Blooming won the Copa Cine Center after defeating Wilstermann by a 4–0 score (5-1 agg.) in the final played at Estadio Tahuichi Aguilera. Huth played in all 8 matches of that pre-season winter tournament and scored one goal. The defender left the club in December 2015 as result of a financial crisis.

=== Rubio Ñu ===
In 2021, Huth joined Rubio Ñu for the División Intermedia season.

In April 2021, in a team with Víctor Centurión, Huth started in a 0–0 draw against Atyrá but was replaced in the 24th minute, suffering a knee injury.

== International career ==
=== Paraguay U20 ===
In 2008, Huth became an integrant of the Paraguay U20 national team coached by Adrián Coria.

Huth was a member of Paraguay U-20 national team at 2009 South American Youth Championship. the team included Luis Fernando Paez, Hernán Pérez, Aldo Paniagua, Celso Ortiz and Rodrigo Burgos. ESPN highlighted Huth and Paez as being at European clubs and players that came through Tacuary's youth system. Huth played 8 of 9 matches of the tournament. He played all the matches as starters for the Runner-up side. Following Paraguay's game against Uruguay in the second round of the championships, Goal.com noted Huth as the best player on the pitch. Following the 2009 South American U20 Championship, Goal.com included Huth in the Team of the Tournament.

He also played at 2009 FIFA U-20 World Cup which he played 3 out of 4 Paraguay's scheduled matches. He was suspended for the 3rd (and last) group match after being sent off against Egypt U20.

=== Paraguay ===
Huth debuted for Paraguay in a 4–2 friendly loss against Argentina where he was substituted onto the field on 71 minutes for Óscar Ayala on 26 May 2011.

== Honours ==
=== Club ===
- Liverpool
  - Youth team
    - Dallas Cup winner: 2008
  - Reserves
    - Premier Reserve League National champion: 2007–08
    - Premier Reserve League North champion: 2007–08
    - Senior Cup: 2008–09
- Blooming
  - Copa Cine Center winner: 2015

== Personal life ==
Huth's maternal grandfather is Italian, which enabled him to obtain an Italian passport.

Huth stated that his idols are Steven Gerrard and Zinedine Zidane.
