= David Martin (footballer, born 1986) =

English footballer

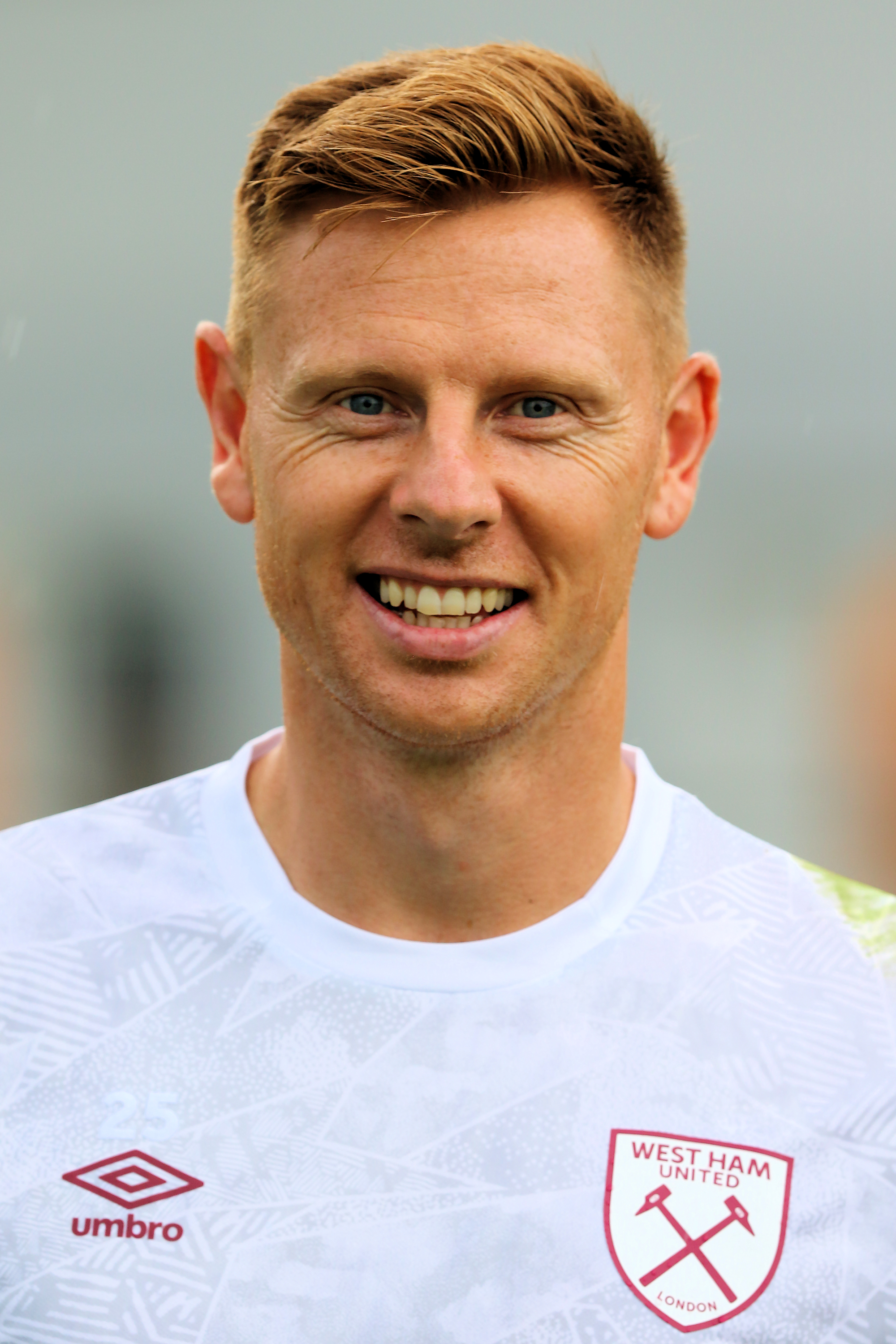
- Martin with West Ham United in 2019

Personal information
- Full name: David Edward Martin
- Date of birth: 22 January 1986 (age 40)
- Place of birth: Romford, London, England
- Height: 6 ft 1 in (1.85 m)
- Position: Goalkeeper

Team information
- Current team: West Ham United Head of Academy Goalkeeping

Youth career
- Tottenham Hotspur
- West Ham United
- Wimbledon

Senior career*
Years	Team	Apps	(Gls)
2003–2004	Wimbledon	2	(0)
2004–2006	Milton Keynes Dons	15	(0)
2006–2010	Liverpool	0	(0)
2007	→ Accrington Stanley (loan)	10	(0)
2008–2009	→ Leicester City (loan)	25	(0)
2009	→ Tranmere Rovers (loan)	3	(0)
2009–2010	→ Leeds United (loan)	0	(0)
2010	→ Derby County (loan)	2	(0)
2010–2017	Milton Keynes Dons	274	(0)
2017–2019	Millwall	11	(0)
2019–2022	West Ham United	5	(0)
2022–2023	Milton Keynes Dons	0	(0)
2023–2024	Southend United	9	(0)
2024–2025	Ipswich Town	0	(0)
Total		356	(0)

International career
2001–2002	England U16	3	(0)
2002–2003	England U17	3	(0)
2004	England U18	1	(0)
2004–2005	England U19	11	(0)
- * Club domestic league appearances and goals

David Edward Martin (born 22 January 1986) is an English former professional footballer who played as a goalkeeper.

He has also played for Wimbledon, Liverpool, Accrington Stanley, Leicester City, Tranmere Rovers, Leeds United, Derby County, Milton Keynes Dons, Millwall, West Ham United, Southend United and at youth international level for England U16, England U17, England U18 and England U19.

== Club career ==
=== Youth career ===
Born in Romford in the London Borough of Havering, the eldest son of former West Ham and Leyton Orient player Alvin Martin, David started his career as a youth-team player with Tottenham Hotspur, where he originally played as defender, later switching to a goalkeeper.

=== Wimbledon and Milton Keynes Dons ===
Martin moved to Wimbledon of the First Division aged 17 in 2003, shortly before the club relocated to Milton Keynes in September of the same year. Martin was handed his professional debut by manager Stuart Murdoch on 19 April 2004, a 2–0 loss away to Burnley, whilst the club were still playing as Wimbledon. After they were officially reformed as Milton Keynes Dons in June 2004, Martin went on to make 25 first team appearances for the Dons, primarily as a backup for Paul Rachubka and later Matt Baker.

=== Liverpool ===
After a successful trial period, Martin signed for Liverpool on 12 January 2006. He was an unused substitute in Liverpool's League Cup game against Reading on 25 October 2006. In his first season playing for Liverpool Reserves he kept eight clean sheets out of 13 starts, and became a regular starter in the reserve team. And when Charles Itandje was injured he was an unused substitute in a number of first team matches.

==== Accrington Stanley loan ====
On 23 February 2007, Martin signed for Football League Two club, Accrington Stanley on loan for a month. However, he was injured within five minutes of his debut, without even touching the ball, against Lincoln City, damaging his ankle which ruled him out for the rest of his loan spell and he returned to Liverpool. After regaining his fitness he returned to Accrington on loan for the rest of the season, making his comeback in a 1–0 win over Torquay United, and helping the club avoid relegation to the Conference National.

==== Return to Liverpool ====
On 6 November 2007, Martin was on the bench when Liverpool beat Turkish club, Beşiktaş 8–0 at Anfield in their UEFA Champions League group match. He was a member of the Liverpool reserve team which was Premier Reserve League Northern champions and Premier League National champions in the 2007–08 season. In May 2008 he signed a new contract with Liverpool until June 2010.

==== Leicester City loan ====
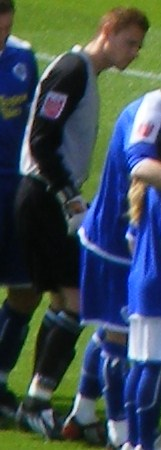
Martin with Leicester City.

On 4 August 2008, Martin joined League One team Leicester City on a six-month loan, making his debut in a 1–0 home win over Stockport on 12 August. In December, Martin's loan deal at Leicester was extended until the end of the season. He revealed on 30 January 2009 that he wanted a permanent move to Leicester, having made 13 clean sheets in 26 appearances for the club. Martin made a total of 25 league appearances as Leicester secured their promotion as league champions, but was unable to secure a permanent deal with the club.

==== Return to Liverpool again ====
Rafael Benitez named Martin in Liverpool's 28-man squad for the 2009–10 Champions League group stage.

==== Tranmere Rovers loan ====
On 16 October 2009, Martin joined Tranmere Rovers on loan for a month. He competed for the number one jersey with Luke Daniels and played three league games for Tranmere before returning to Liverpool. Martin was an unused substitute against Southampton.

==== Leeds United loan ====
On 26 November, Martin joined Leeds United on loan until 28 December to provide cover for the injured Shane Higgs and provide competition with Casper Ankergren and Alan Martin. Liverpool decided to not allow him to be available for Leeds' FA Cup games. Martin was named on the bench against Oldham Athletic, meaning he replaced Alan Martin as Leeds' sub goalkeeper whilst Higgs was injured.

He made his debut for Leeds in the Football League Trophy Northern Section semi-final at Elland Road against Accrington Stanley. On 24 December he extended his loan by a further month, until 30 January, and Liverpool also gave him permission to play for Leeds against Manchester United in the FA Cup. The loan extension was largely to do with Higgs suffering a further setback in his recovery from injury. Martin's loan deal was extended again on Transfer on deadline day (1 February) until 10 February 2010 after which he returned to Liverpool.

==== Derby County loan ====
On 12 March 2010, Martin joined Derby County on a month's loan as cover for the injured Stephen Bywater and to play in the match against Doncaster Rovers on 13 March after reserve goalkeeper, Saul Deeney, received a red card during the same match against Reading on 10 March. He kept his place for a 2–2 draw with Middlesbrough but the return of Bywater, combined with the allowance of only five loan players in the match day squad when Derby had six, saw Martin uninvolved with the first team for the remainder of his month at the club. He returned to Liverpool on 12 April 2010.

=== Milton Keynes Dons (second spell) ===
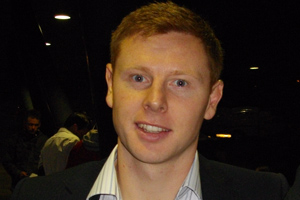
Martin in 2011

Martin signed for former club Milton Keynes Dons on 12 May 2010 and was new manager Karl Robinson's first signing at the club. He joined on 1 July 2010. On 3 May 2016, Martin was named the club's Player of the Year for the 2015–16 season.

On 20 April 2017, after nine seasons and 339 appearances for the club, Martin announced that he would be leaving MK Dons at the end of the 2016–17 season.

=== Millwall ===
Martin signed for newly promoted Championship side Millwall on 1 September 2017. At the end of the 2017–18 season, his contract was automatically extended by Millwall. On 17 March 2019, Martin apologised on Twitter following making a 95th minute error in Millwall's FA Cup quarter-final tie against Brighton & Hove Albion to allow Solly March to equalise for Brighton and take the game into extra time. Millwall eventually lost on penalties.

=== West Ham United ===
On 3 June 2019, Martin signed a two-year contract with Premier League side West Ham United, to provide cover for first choice keepers Łukasz Fabiański and Roberto. Martin made his West Ham and Premier League debut on 30 November 2019 after Fabiański picked up an injury and Roberto was dropped due to poor form, keeping a clean sheet in a 1–0 away win against Chelsea; a performance which Martin later described as the best day of his life. At the end of the 2020–21 season, Martin signed a one-year contract extension, seeing him undertake a player-coach role for the 2021–22 season. In May 2022, West Ham announced that Martin would be leaving the club at the end of his contract in June 2022.

=== Milton Keynes Dons (third spell) ===
Martin signed again for former club Milton Keynes Dons on 23 September 2022, agreeing to a player-coach contract. He reunited with Dean Lewington, whom he played alongside for both Wimbledon and Milton Keynes Dons in 2004, and subsequent years for the latter club.

Following the conclusion of the 2022–23 season, Martin was one of nine players released by Milton Keynes Dons following their relegation to EFL League Two.

=== Southend United ===
Martin joined Southend United on non-contract terms at the start of the 2023–24 season in a goalkeeping coach role. On 19 September 2023, he was registered as a player to provide cover for the injured goalkeeper Collin Andeng-Ndi. He made his first appearance for the club in a 2–0 victory over Maidenhead United the same day.

=== Ipswich Town ===
Having played nine games for Southend, in July 2024 Martin joined newly promoted Premier League team Ipswich Town in a player-coach capacity.

== International career ==
Martin played for the England under-17 at the UEFA European Under-17 Football Championship in 2003. He played for the England under-19 team at the UEFA European Under-19 Football Championship in 2005, when England were runners-up to France Under 20s in the final held at Windsor Park, Belfast Northern Ireland. He has also been capped once by the England under-20 team.

== Personal life ==
Martin is the son of former West Ham United player Alvin Martin. His brother Joe is also a footballer.

== Career statistics ==
As of match played 16 December 2023

Appearances and goals by club, season and competition
Club	Season	League			FA Cup		League Cup		Other		Total	
Club	Season	Division	Apps	Goals	Apps	Goals	Apps	Goals	Apps	Goals	Apps	Goals
Wimbledon	2003–04	Division 1	2	0	0	0	0	0	—		2	0
Milton Keynes Dons	2004–05	League One	15	0	3	0	1	0	1	0	20	0
Milton Keynes Dons	2005–06	League One	0	0	0	0	0	0	3	0	3	0
Milton Keynes Dons	Total		15	0	3	0	1	0	4	0	23	0
Liverpool	2005–06	Premier League	0	0	0	0	0	0	0	0	0	0
Liverpool	2006–07	Premier League	0	0	0	0	0	0	0	0	0	0
Liverpool	2007–08	Premier League	0	0	0	0	0	0	0	0	0	0
Liverpool	2008–09	Premier League	0	0	0	0	0	0	0	0	0	0
Liverpool	2009–10	Premier League	0	0	0	0	0	0	0	0	0	0
Liverpool	Total		0	0	0	0	0	0	0	0	0	0
Accrington Stanley (loan)	2006–07	League Two	10	0	0	0	0	0	0	0	10	0
Leicester City (loan)	2008–09	League One	25	0	3	0	2	0	0	0	30	0
Tranmere Rovers (loan)	2009–10	League One	3	0	0	0	0	0	0	0	3	0
Leeds United (loan)	2009–10	League One	0	0	0	0	0	0	1	0	1	0
Derby County (loan)	2009–10	Championship	2	0	0	0	0	0	—		2	0
Milton Keynes Dons	2010–11	League One	43	0	2	0	3	0	3	0	51	0
Milton Keynes Dons	2011–12	League One	46	0	4	0	3	0	3	0	56	0
Milton Keynes Dons	2012–13	League One	31	0	7	0	2	0	1	0	41	0
Milton Keynes Dons	2013–14	League One	40	0	3	0	0	0	0	0	43	0
Milton Keynes Dons	2014–15	League One	39	0	3	0	4	0	1	0	47	0
Milton Keynes Dons	2015–16	Championship	35	0	2	0	1	0	—		38	0
Milton Keynes Dons	2016–17	League One	40	0	2	0	0	0	0	0	42	0
Milton Keynes Dons	Total		274	0	23	0	14	0	8	0	318	0
Millwall	2017–18	Championship	1	0	3	0	0	0	—		4	0
Millwall	2018–19	Championship	10	0	1	0	0	0	—		11	0
Millwall	Total		11	0	4	0	0	0	—		15	0
West Ham United	2019–20	Premier League	5	0	0	0	0	0	—		5	0
West Ham United	2020–21	Premier League	0	0	0	0	0	0	—		0	0
West Ham United	2021–22	Premier League	0	0	0	0	0	0	0	0	0	0
West Ham United	Total		5	0	0	0	0	0	—		5	0
Milton Keynes Dons	2022–23	League One	0	0	0	0	0	0	—		0	0
Southend United	2023–24	National League	9	0	0	0	—		0	0	9	0
Career total			356	0	33	0	16	0	13	0	418	0

== Honours ==
Liverpool Reserves

- Premier Reserve League: 2007–08
- Premier Reserve League North Division: 2007–08

Leicester City

- Football League One: 2008–09

Milton Keynes Dons

- Football League One runner-up: 2014–15

Individual

- Milton Keynes Dons Player of the Year: 2015–16
