= 2008 UEFA European Under-19 Championship =

2008 UEFA Under-19 Championship
Mistrovství Evropy ve fotbale hráčů do 19 let 2008

Tournament details
- Host country: Czech Republic
- Dates: 14–26 July
- Teams: 8
- Venues: 6 (in 6 host cities)

Final positions
- Champions: Germany (2nd title)
- Runners-up: Italy

Tournament statistics
- Matches played: 15
- Goals scored: 37 (2.47 per match)
- Top scorer: (Czech Republic) Tomáš Necid (4 goals)
- Best player(s): (Germany) Lars Bender (Germany) Sven Bender

The final tournament of the 2008 UEFA European Under-19 Championship was the 24th UEFA European Under-19 Championship, UEFA's premier competition for players under the age of 19. The tournament was held in the Czech Republic with matches played from 14 July to 26 July 2008. Players born after 1 January 1989 were eligible to participate in this competition. The top three teams in each group qualified for the 2009 U-20 World Cup.

== Qualification ==
Qualification for the final tournament was played over two stages. The first qualifying stage divided the remaining 52 UEFA nations (minus the hosts, the Czech Republic) into 13 groups of four teams. Matches in the first stage were played from 24 September 2007 to 15 November 2007. The top two teams in each group and the two best third-placed teams then qualified for the elite qualifying stage, where the 28 teams were divided into seven groups of four. Matches in the elite qualifying stage were played from 1 March 2008 to 31 May 2008, when the top team from each group advanced to the final tournament.

The following teams qualified for the tournament:

- Czech Republic (as host)
- Bulgaria
- England
- Germany
- Greece
- Hungary
- Italy
- Spain

== Final group stage ==
The groups were drawn on 1 June 2008 in Prague by the first vice-chairman of the UEFA Youth and Amateur Football Committee, Jim Boyce, and senior Czech internationals Petr Čech and Martin Fenin.

In the following tables:

Key: Pld Matches played, W Won, D Drawn, L Lost, GF Goals for, GA Goals against, GD Goal Difference, Pts Points

Team qualified for the Semi-Final

=== Group A ===
Team	Pld	W	D	L	GF	GA	GD	Pts
Germany	3	3	0	0	7	2	+5	9
Hungary	3	2	0	1	3	2	+1	6
Spain	3	1	0	2	5	3	+2	3
Bulgaria	3	0	0	3	0	8	−8	0

14 July
17:30 CET

Bulgaria	0–1	Hungary
	Report	Németh 10'

FK Viktoria Stadion, Prague
Referee: Albert Toussaint (Luxembourg)
14 July
19:30 CET

Germany	2–1	Spain
Sukuta-Pasu 7'; Toprak 56'	Report	Alba 66'

Stadion města Plzně, Plzeň
Referee: Willie Collum (Scotland)

17 July
18:00 CET

Spain	0–1	Hungary
	Report	Nagy 71'

Na Litavce, Příbram
Referee: Aleksandar Stavrev (Macedonia)
17 July
20:30 CET

Germany	3–0	Bulgaria
Diekmeier 16'; Nsereko 43'; L. Bender 56'	Report

Stadion města Plzně, Plzeň
Referee: Svein Oddvar Moen (Norway)

20 July
20:00 CET

Hungary	1–2	Germany
Simon 74'	Report	Reinartz 36'; Risse 76'

Na Litavce, Příbram
Referee: Dejan Filipović (Serbia)
20 July
20:00 CET

Spain	4–0	Bulgaria
Aarón 14'; Nsue 17', 52'; Mérida 64'	Report

FK Viktoria Stadion, Prague
Referee: Olivier Thual (France)

=== Group B ===
Team	Pld	W	D	L	GF	GA	GD	Pts
Italy	3	1	2	0	5	4	+1	5
Czech Republic	3	1	1	1	5	4	+1	4
England	3	1	1	1	3	2	+1	4
Greece	3	0	2	1	1	4	−3	2

14 July
17:30 CET

Czech Republic	2–0	England
Necid 54', 58'	Report

Stadion Střelnice, Jablonec nad Nisou
Referee: Aleksandar Stavrev (Macedonia)
14 July
19:30 CET

Greece	1–1	Italy
Pavlis 23'	Report	Paloschi 90' (pen.)

Městský stadion, Mladá Boleslav
Referee: Dejan Filipović (Serbia)

17 July
18:00 CET

Czech Republic	0–0	Greece
	Report

Stadion u Nisy, Liberec
Attendance: 6,623
Referee: Albert Toussaint (Luxembourg)
17 July
20:00 CET

England	0–0	Italy
	Report

Stadion Střelnice, Jablonec nad Nisou
Referee: Olivier Thual (France)

20 July
18:00 CET

Italy	4–3	Czech Republic
Poli 22', 79'; Bonaventura 56'; Paloschi 72' (pen.)	Report	Necid 23'; Morávek 58', 86'

Městský stadion, Mladá Boleslav
Attendance: 5,000
Referee: Willie Collum (Scotland)
20 July
18:00 CET

England	3–0	Greece
Mee 48'; Sears 68' (pen.); Sturridge 85'	Report

Stadion u Nisy, Liberec
Referee: Svein Oddvar Moen (Norway)

== Knock-out stage ==
=== Bracket ===
Semi-finals
23 July – Mladá Boleslav
Germany (aet)	2
Czech Republic	1
23 July – Plzeň
Italy	1
Hungary	0

Final
26 July – Jablonec nad Nisou
Germany	3
Italy	1

=== Semi-finals ===
23 July
17:30

Italy	1–0	Hungary
Forestieri 65'	Report

Štruncovy Sady Stadion, Plzeň
Attendance: 3023
Referee: Svein Oddvar Moen (Norway)

23 July
20:15

Germany	2–1 (a.e.t.)	Czech Republic
Risse 17'; Sukuta-Pasu 119'	Report	Necid 24'

Městský Stadion, Mladá Boleslav
Attendance: 5,000
Referee: Olivier Thual (France)

=== Final ===
26 July
19:00

Germany	3–1	Italy
L. Bender 24'; Sukuta-Pasu 61'; Gebhart 79'	Report	Garibaldi 78'

Střelnice Stadion, Jablonec nad Nisou
Attendance: 4,100
Referee: Willie Collum (Scotland)

2008 UEFA U-19 European champions

Germany
Second title

== Goalscorers ==
4 goals

- (Czech Republic) Tomáš Necid

3 goals

- (Germany) Richard Sukuta-Pasu

2 goals

- (Czech Republic) Jan Morávek
- (Germany) Lars Bender
- (Germany) Marcel Risse
- (Italy) Alberto Paloschi
- (Italy) Andrea Poli
- (Spain) Emilio Nsue

1 goal

- (England) Benjamin Mee
- (England) Freddie Sears
- (England) Daniel Sturridge

1 goal, cont.

- (Germany) Dennis Diekmeier
- (Germany) Timo Gebhart
- (Germany) Savio Nsereko
- (Germany) Stefan Reinartz
- (Germany) Ömer Toprak
- (Greece) Michalis Pavlis
- (Hungary) Olivér Nagy
- (Hungary) Krisztián Németh
- (Hungary) András Simon
- (Italy) Giacomo Bonaventura
- (Italy) Fernando Forestieri
- (Italy) Silvano Raggio Garibaldi
- (Spain) Jordi Alba
- (Spain) Fran Mérida
- (Spain) Aarón

== Countries to participate in 2009 FIFA U-20 World Cup ==
- Germany
- Hungary
- Spain
- Italy
- Czech Republic
- England

== Team of the tournament ==
After the final, the UEFA technical team selected 22 players to integrate the "team of the tournament".

Goalkeepers

- (England) David Button
- (Hungary) Péter Gulácsi
- (Italy) Vincenzo Fiorillo

Defenders

- (Czech Republic) Jan Polák
- (England) Ben Mee
- (Germany) Dennis Diekmeier
- (Germany) Alexander Eberlein
- (Germany) Stefan Reinartz
- (Greece) Vassilis Lambropoulos
- (Hungary) András Debreceni

Midfielders

- (Czech Republic) Jan Morávek
- (Germany) Deniz Naki
- (Germany) Savio Nsereko
- (Greece) Kyriakos Papadopoulos
- (Hungary) Vladimir Koman
- (Spain) Aarón Ñíguez

Forwards

- (Czech Republic) Tomáš Necid
- (Germany) Timo Gebhart
- (Germany) Richard Sukuta-Pasu
- (Hungary) Krisztián Németh
- (Italy) Fernando Forestieri
- (Spain) Emilio Nsue
