= Krisztián Németh =

Hungarian footballer (born 1989)

Personal information
- Full name: Krisztián Németh
- Date of birth: 5 January 1989 (age 37)
- Place of birth: Győr, Hungary
- Height: 1.80 m (5 ft 11 in)
- Position: Striker

Youth career
- 2003–2005: Győr

Senior career*
Years	Team	Apps	(Gls)
2005–2007	MTK Budapest	37	(14)
2007–2010	Liverpool	0	(0)
2009	→ Blackpool (loan)	1	(0)
2009–2010	→ AEK Athens (loan)	19	(3)
2010–2012	Olympiacos	4	(0)
2011	→ Olympiacos Volos (loan)	13	(1)
2011–2012	→ MTK Budapest (loan)	1	(1)
2012	→ RKC Waalwijk (loan)	18	(4)
2012–2014	Roda JC	45	(10)
2015	Sporting Kansas City	28	(11)
2016–2017	Al-Gharafa	26	(13)
2017–2018	New England Revolution	21	(1)
2018–2019	Sporting Kansas City	33	(9)
2020	DAC Dunajská Streda	1	(0)
2020	Columbus Crew	4	(1)
2021	Debrecen	7	(1)
2022–2026	MTK Budapest	102	(35)

International career
2005–2006	Hungary U17	9	(11)
2006–2008	Hungary U19	15	(14)
2009	Hungary U20	6	(9)
2009–2010	Hungary U21	5	(2)
2010–2019	Hungary	37	(4)
Medal record
Representing Hungary
Men's football
FIFA U-20 World Cup
Third place	2009 Egypt
- * Club domestic league appearances and goals as of 30 May 2026

Krisztián Németh (Hungarian pronunciation: [ˈkristiaːn ˈneːmɛt]; born 5 January 1989) is a Hungarian former professional footballer who played as a striker.

== Club career ==
Born in Győr, Németh started his career at hometown club ETO Győr where he played from 2003 to 2005 as a youth player.

=== MTK Budapest FC ===
In 2005, he signed for MTK Hungária, with whom he scored 18 goals in 37 league games and helped the club to finish as runners-up in the Hungarian National Championship I in 2006–07.

=== Liverpool ===
He signed a three-year contract with Liverpool, alongside András Simon in the summer of 2007. He was regarded by the club as an upcoming talent and had been tipped for a bright future at the Merseyside club, who stated on their official site that "big things are expected of Németh." Though he is mostly used as a striker, he often drops into a deeper position during games, where he is able to take advantage of the additional space to make his trademark backheel passes.

Németh scored twice on his debut for Liverpool Reserves on 27 November 2007 against Manchester City. A week later, he scored twice in a 3–0 win against Everton Reserves at the Halliwell Jones Stadium. He scored a fifth goal in three games against Middlesbrough Reserves sending Liverpool to the top of the Premier Reserve League North. He later started for the reserves against Sunderland Reserves and lobbed the keeper giving Liverpool the win and sending them five points clear at the top of the league.

In April 2008, Németh scored the only goal of the game against Blackburn Rovers Reserves which secured the Premier Reserve League North title. On 7 May, he scored the first goal as the Reserves beat Aston Villa reserves 3–0 at Anfield to clinch the Premier Reserve League national title. He was the Premier Reserve League North Top scorer in the 2007–08 season. His impressive displays in the latter half of the season earned him recognition as Liverpool Fans' Reserves Player of the Year for the 2007–08 season.

On 30 July Nemeth was a second-half substitute in Liverpool's pre-season friendly against Villarreal where he almost gave Liverpool the lead but the shot went just over the crossbar. On 2 August Nemeth was introduced as a second-half substitute in another pre-season friendly against Rangers. His shot was saved on 58 minutes but tapped in by Yossi Benayoun. Then on 70 minutes he was fouled in the penalty area and Xabi Alonso scored the resulting penalty.

Németh was handed the number 29 shirt for the 2008–09 season, previously he had no official first team number.

On 26 January 2009, he signed for Championship club Blackpool in a one-month loan deal. A day later, he made his debut for the Seasiders as a 59th-minute substitute at Bloomfield Road, creating their best chance by teeing up David Fox. Blackpool lost 3–0, and it was discovered afterwards that he had fractured his cheek bone when he clashed with a QPR defender just 60 seconds into his debut.

Németh was one of several reserve players brought along for the pre-season friendlies, where he started the games against St Gallen, Rapid Vienna and Thailand. He then scored a brace against Singapore in a 5–0 victory.

Due to injuries, Németh was not able to fulfil his potential at Liverpool, and subsequently moved to Olympiacos on a permanent deal following his loan spell at AEK Athens.

=== AEK Athens ===
It was announced by Liverpool on 25 August 2009 that he would spend the 2009–10 season on loan to AEK Athens. After visiting AEK for the first time, he said he is looking forward to the challenge saying "I am coming to a big club and a great city." He then laid out his ambitions stating "I hope we can win the championship." On 30 August, he made his debut coming on as a first-half substitute against Atromitos. He assisted Ismael Blanco for the only goal of the game with a great run, and was a constant threat to the Atromitos defence throughout. As a result of this, he was voted the MVP in the Super Liga for that week.

On 20 September, he scored his first goal for AEK, netting in a 1–1 draw with PAS Giannina. Later that week on 23 September, he scored another goal in a 1–2 defeat to fierce rivals Olympiacos

Upon returning from the FIFA U-20 World Cup, he featured in every match before the international break, most notably the 3–1 victory against AEL on 9 November where he scored a header after being introduced as a half time substitute.

As the season entered 2010, Nemeth struggled with an ankle injury picked up on international duty. This forced him out of several months, as he returned only for the last few games of the season, where he appeared mainly as a substitute. In the final game of the regular season against Asteras Tripolis, he provided both assists in a 2–0 home win, ensuring AEK went into the play-offs as the third placed team. Throughout the season Nemeth produced more assists than goals, meaning his contribution to AEK was still important, and helped them secure second place in the play-offs.

=== Olympiacos ===
On 19 August 2010, Olympiacos F.C. announced that they had concluded a deal with Liverpool to sign Németh on a 3-year deal. The fee was originally m, but later the fee was reduced to m. There is a clause in his Olympiacos contract that states Liverpool are due 25% of any future sale of the player by Olympiacos F.C. The deal was confirmed by Olympiacos F.C. on 23 August. Németh never made a competitive first-team appearance for Liverpool, despite playing for them in pre-season. On 3 November, Németh made his debut for Olympiacos, playing the full 90 minutes in a 1–0 win against Ilioupoli F.C. in a Greek Cup tie. 3 days later on the 6th, Nemeth made his League debut for Olympiacos, assisting Marko Pantelić for the 4th goal within minutes of coming on in a 5–0 thrashing of Panionios.

On 2 September 2011, he terminated his contract with Olympiacos.

=== Olympiacos Volos ===
On 28 January, he joined Olympiacos Volos on a 6-month loan. Németh scored his only goal for Olympiacos Volos against Panserraikos in a 3–0 home win. Finally, his team won the match by 3–0. At the end of the championship Németh returned to Olympiacos Piraeus and in the summer of 2011 he ended his contract with the Greek club.

=== MTK Budapest ===
On 4 November 2011 Németh signed a half-year contract with MTK Budapest FC. He previously played for the Hungarian club. Németh did not want to join any other Hungarian club except for MTK. Therefore, he returned to his first club in order to help them back to the first division of the Hungarian League. Németh scored the only goal during his return to MTK against Soproni VSE in the 58th minute.

=== RKC Waalwijk ===
On 26 January Nemeth signed a six-month contract at RKC Waalwijk. Németh scored his first goal in the Eredivisie against Vitesse Arnhem in the 37th minute and the match ended with 1–0 victory. On 17 March Waalwijk beat De Graafschap by 1–0 thanks to Németh's goal in the 78th minute. At the end of the season Németh had to return to Olympiacos, although he preferred to play in the Netherlands. Németh scored four goals in seventeen matches in the Eredivisie 2011-12 season. After his return to the Greek club Németh terminated his contract with Olympiacos and declared to continue his career at one of the Eredivisie clubs. RKC Waalwijk appointed former Hungary national football team manager Erwin Koeman, who tried to convince Németh to sign the contract with Waalwijk. Finally, Németh followed his former Waalwijk manager, Ruud Brood to Roda JC in summer of 2012.

=== Roda JC ===
On 18 July 2012, Németh signed a two-year contract at Dutch Eredivisie club Roda JC. On 1 September 2012, Németh scored his first goal for Roda against Willem II in the 74th minute in the Eredivisie 2012–13 season. On 15 July 2014, Németh and Roda mutually terminated the contract between the player and the club. Nemeth became a free agent.

On 23 September 2014, it was revealed by Nemzeti Sport that Németh refused the offer of Śląsk Wrocław. According to a Polish journal (sport.pl), the offer was -9000 monthly salary. On 18 December 2014, Nemzeti Sport revealed that Németh might be signed by Major Soccer League club Sporting Kansas City.

=== Sporting Kansas City ===
On 18 December 2014, Major Soccer League club Sporting Kansas City signed Németh. Sporting Kansas City manager, Peter Vermes said that "the fact that he was spending time in Holland before coming to us will help him adapt to our team pretty quickly".

On 6 April 2015, Németh scored his first goal in the 2015 Major League Soccer season against Philadelphia Union in a 3–2 victory in the 94th minute. On 19 April 2015, Németh scored his first goal in an away match against LA Galaxy at the StubHub Center, in Carson, California. The match ended with a 2–1 home win. On 26 April 2015, Németh scored in a 4–4 thriller at the BBVA Compass Stadium in Houston, Texas against Houston Dynamo. On 5 May 2015, Németh recorded his first brace in MLS, scoring twice against New England Revolution at Sporting Park on the way to a 4–2 home victory In June 2015, it was announced that Németh was the MLS Player of the Month for May. His goal in Sporting Kansas City's 1–0 away win over the Portland Timbers on 3 October won the 2015 MLS Goal of the Year Award.

=== Al-Gharafa ===
On 29 January 2016, Németh was transferred to Al-Gharafa. In February 2017 it was reported Németh would like to return to MLS mentioning his former MLS club as having a "beautiful stadium that sells out every week"

=== New England Revolution ===
On 10 August 2017, Németh signed with Major League Soccer side New England Revolution, who acquired him via a trade with Columbus Crew SC. Columbus received $200,000 in Targeted Allocation Money, $200,000 in General Allocation Money and an international roster spot. He made his Revolution debut on 2 September as a 92nd-minute substitute for Kei Kamara in a 4–0 win over Orlando City SC. He recorded his first Revolution assist in the match, setting up Teal Bunbury's 92nd-minute goal with only his second touch of the match. He made his first Revolution start on 15 September. He scored his first Revolution goal on 22 October against the Montreal Impact. He concluded the 2017 New England Revolution season with a goal and an assist in 6 appearances (3 starts). In early 2018 reports surfaced that the Revolution had attempted to trade Németh but that his salary ($1 million) was prohibitive. In the 2018 New England Revolution season Németh primarily played as a substitute, recording 4 starts in 15 total appearances, notching two assists.

=== Sporting Kansas City ===
On 6 August 2018, Németh signed with Major League Soccer club Sporting Kansas City, who acquired him via a trade with New England Revolution. New England received $350,000 in allocation money and a first-round pick in the 2020 MLS SuperDraft. He scored a hat trick against the Montreal Impact on 30 March 2019.

=== FC DAC 1904 Dunajská Streda ===
On 26 February 2020, Slovak club FC DAC 1904 Dunajská Streda announced that they had signed Németh after his contract had expired in Kansas City. Németh only made one appearance for FC DAC 1904 and did not score.

=== Columbus Crew SC ===
On 5 October 2020, Columbus Crew SC announced that they had signed Németh.

== International career ==
=== Under 17's ===
Németh was a part of the Hungary under-17 squad that reached the 2006 UEFA European Under-17 Football Championship finals in Luxembourg. His first half hat-trick against Sweden under-17s on 30 March 2006 secured the Hungarians a place at the finals with a 4–0 win. He scored two goals in the finals in Luxembourg as Hungary were knocked out in the group stages.

He was named in the Hungarian under-17 Team of the Year in 2006. In 2007, he was named in the under-18 "Team of Europe". In 2008, he was named in the Hungarian under-19 Team of the Year.

=== Under 19's ===
In May 2008 he scored the goal against Portugal under-19s that put the Hungary under-19's through to the 2008 UEFA European Under-19 Football Championship. He was also called up to the Hungarian senior squad and was an unused substitute in their 1–1 draw with Croatia. On 14 July he scored the only goal in Hungary under-19s 1–0 victory over Bulgaria under-19s in their first group game at the UEFA Under-19 European Championships at the FK Viktoria Stadion in Prague, Czech Republic. He also played in their victory over Spain under-19s on 17 July as Hungary qualified for the semi-finals and Németh played in the 1–0 loss to Italy under 19s on 23 July.

He scored seven goals in three matches for the Under-19s in a mini-tournament in Cyprus.

=== Under 20s ===
In September 2009, he was called up to the Hungary U-20 squad for the FIFA U-20 World Cup. He played in two of three group matches, scoring once against United Arab Emirates to help Hungary finish top. On 9 October, he played in Hungary's quarter-final match against Italy. With the game level at 1–1 in extra time, he scored to make it 2–1 to the Hungarians, though Italy were quick to equalise. With just 3 minutes left of extra time, he latched onto a through ball from Vladimir Koman and slotted coolly past the 'keeper to secure Hungary's place in the semi-finals. In the semi-finals though, he was substituted at half-time in a 3–2 loss to Ghana. His tournament ended on a high however, winning a 90th-minute penalty in the third-place playoff match against Costa Rica, taking the game to extra time after Vladimir Koman converted. He then went on to score one of only two penalties in the shootout to seal third place for Hungary.

=== Under 21s ===
On 13 November 2009 in a qualification match for the 2011 UEFA European Under-21 Football Championship he scored his first U21 goal after a reverse pass from clubmate András Simon, as Hungary beat Italy 2–0.

=== Senior national team ===
On 14 May 2010, Németh was called up to Hungary for the friendly matches against Germany and The Netherlands. On 29 May, he made his international debut for Hungary as he came on as a substitute against Germany in the 61st minute. On 10 September 2013, Németh scored his first goal wearing the national Team's shirt in a 5–1 victory over Estonia in the 2014 FIFA World Cup qualification match at the Puskás Ferenc Stadium.

On 31 May 2016, Nemeth was selected for the Hungarian squad at the Euro 2016 tournament in France.

On 14 June 2016, Németh played in the first group match in a 2–0 victory over Austria at the UEFA Euro 2016 Group F match at Nouveau Stade de Bordeaux, Bordeaux, France. He also played in the last group match in a 3–3 draw against Portugal at the Parc Olympique Lyonnais, Lyon on 22 June 2016.

== Career statistics ==
=== International ===
As of match played 5 September 2019

Appearances and goals by national team and year
National team	Year	Apps	Goals
Hungary	2010	1	0
Hungary	2011	3	0
Hungary	2012	7	0
Hungary	2013	4	1
Hungary	2014	0	0
Hungary	2015	8	2
Hungary	2016	7	0
Hungary	2017	2	0
Hungary	2018	3	1
Hungary	2019	2	0
Total		37	4

As of 23 March 2018

Scores and results list Hungary's goal tally first, score column indicates score after each Németh goal.

List of international goals scored by Krisztián Németh
No.	Date	Venue	Cap	Opponent	Score	Result	Competition
1	10 September 2013	Ferenc Puskás Stadium, Budapest, Hungary	13	Estonia	4–1	5–1	2014 FIFA World Cup qualification
2	11 October 2015	Karaiskakis Stadium, Piraeus, Greece	21	Greece	2–1	3–4	UEFA Euro 2016 qualification
3	11 October 2015	Karaiskakis Stadium, Piraeus, Greece	21	Greece	3–2	3–4	UEFA Euro 2016 qualification
4	23 March 2018	Groupama Arena, Budapest, Hungary	33	Kazakhstan	2–3	2–3	Friendly

== Honours ==
Liverpool Reserves

- Premier Reserve League National: 2007–08
- Liverpool Senior Cup: 2008–09

Olympiacos

- Super League Greece: 2010–11

Sporting Kansas City

- Lamar Hunt U.S. Open Cup: 2015

Columbus Crew

- MLS Cup: 2020

Hungary

- UEFA European Under-19 Football Championship semi-finalist: 2008
- FIFA U-20 World Cup Third place: 2009

Individual

- Young Hungarian Player of the Year: 2006
- Europe U-18 Team: 2007
- Young Liverpool Player of the Year: 2008
- Liverpool Reserves Player of the Year: 2007–08
- MLS Goal of the Year Award: 2015

== Personal life ==
On 22 December 2014, along with Roland Juhász, Németh brought Christmas gifts to the Margaréta Gyermekotthon, an orphanage in Szátok, Nógrád County, Hungary. Németh said that "it was incredibly touching to see those kids' performance that they learnt to welcome us".
