= 2005–06 FA Premier Reserve League =

English football league season

The 2005–06 FA Premier Reserve League season was the seventh since its establishment, and the last to feature more than 20 teams. The Northern League was won by Manchester United Reserves, while the Southern League was won by Tottenham Hotspur Reserves.

== League table ==
=== Reserve League North ===
Pos	Club	Pld	W	D	L	GF	GA	GD	Pts
1	Manchester United Reserves	28	19	2	7	68	32	+36	59
2	Aston Villa Reserves	28	16	8	4	59	26	+33	56
3	Manchester City Reserves	28	15	8	5	47	37	+10	53
4	Middlesbrough Reserves	28	15	7	6	50	27	+23	52
5	Newcastle United Reserves	28	12	8	8	45	40	+5	44
6	Liverpool Reserves	28	13	5	10	31	31	0	44
7	Sunderland Reserves	28	10	8	10	38	41	−3	38
8	Everton Reserves	28	10	8	10	31	35	−4	38
9	Leeds United Reserves	28	9	11	8	27	31	−4	38
10	Blackburn Rovers Reserves	28	8	7	13	38	46	−8	31
11	Birmingham City Reserves	28	7	9	12	32	36	−4	30
12	Wolverhampton Wanderers Reserves	28	6	8	14	28	37	−9	26
13	Bolton Wanderers Reserves	28	6	7	15	25	44	−19	25
14	West Bromwich Albion Reserves	28	6	6	16	26	55	−29	24
15	Wigan Athletic Reserves	28	5	4	19	24	51	−27	19

=== Reserve League South ===
Pos	Club	Pld	W	D	L	GF	GA	GD	Pts
1	Tottenham Hotspur Reserves	26	20	3	3	57	13	+44	63
2	Southampton Reserves	26	16	3	7	50	26	+24	51
3	Arsenal Reserves	26	14	7	5	60	34	+26	49
4	Charlton Athletic Reserves	26	14	4	8	38	29	+9	46
5	Coventry City Reserves	26	13	1	12	30	36	−6	40
6	Chelsea Reserves	26	10	9	7	34	24	+10	39
7	Fulham Reserves	26	11	3	12	26	32	−6	36
8	Crystal Palace Reserves	26	10	5	11	43	42	+1	35
9	Ipswich Town Reserves	26	10	1	15	44	54	−10	31
10	West Ham United Reserves	26	7	8	11	37	38	−1	29
11	Leicester City Reserves	26	7	7	12	38	57	−19	28
12	Watford Reserves	26	8	3	15	25	51	−26	27
13	Portsmouth Reserves	26	6	4	16	35	54	−19	22
14	Norwich City Reserves	26	4	6	16	19	46	−27	18

Pld = Matches played; W = Matches won; D = Matches drawn; L = Matches lost; F = Goals for; A = Goals against; GD = Goal difference; Pts = Points

== North/South Play-off Shield ==
The north–south play-off was won by Manchester United Reserves, who beat Tottenham Hotspur Reserves 2–0 at Old Trafford on 4 May 2006.

4 May 2006

Manchester United Reserves	2–0	Tottenham Hotspur Reserves
Gerard Piqué 24'; Ole Gunnar Solskjær 28'

Old Trafford, Manchester
Attendance: 2,416

== See also ==
- 2005–06 in English football
- FA Premier League 2005–06
