= Aldo Paniagua =

Paraguayan footballer (born 1989)

Personal information
- Full name: Aldo Andrés Paniagua Benítez
- Date of birth: 12 July 1989 (age 37)
- Place of birth: Independencia, Paraguay
- Height: 1.82 m (6 ft 0 in)
- Position: Midfielder

Youth career
- General Caballero ZC

Senior career*
Years	Team	Apps	(Gls)
2007–2008	General Caballero ZC	23	(2)
2008–2009	→ 12 de Octubre (loan)	29	(1)
2010	→ Nacional Asunción (loan)	15	(0)
2011	General Caballero ZC	16	(1)
2012	Rubio Ñú	13	(0)
2014–2017	General Caballero ZC	0	(0)
2014	→ Olimpia Asunción (loan)	10	(1)
2015	→ Deportivo Capiatá (loan)	1	(0)
2015–2016	→ Sport Boys (loan)	39	(5)
2017–2019	Nacional Potosí		

International career
2009	Paraguay U20	6	(3)
- * Club domestic league appearances and goals

Aldo Andrés Paniagua Benítez (born 12 July 1989) is a Paraguayan former professional footballer who played as a midfielder.

== Club career ==
Paniagua was born in Independencia, Paraguay. He began his youth career with General Caballero ZC and made his first team debut with the club in 2007. After the 2008 season he joined 12 de Octubre and was a regular starter for the club at right midfield. His play with 12 de Octubre did not go unnoticed by top Paraguayan club Club Nacional who signed Paniagua for the 2010 season. Paniagua featured regularly for Nacional and also appeared in three matches in Copa Libertadores 2010 and scored the opening goal in a 2–0 victory over CF Monterrey on 21 April 2010. In 2011 Paniagua returned to General Caballero to fortify the club for its return to the Primera División.

=== 2012 MLS SuperDraft ===
During January 2012, Paniagua participated in the 2012 MLS SuperDraft in hopes of getting selected by a club in Major League Soccer. He was a highlighted player in two trial games performed, and noted one goal as well.

=== Olimpia Asunción ===
On 2 January 2014, Paniagua signed with Olimpia Asunción to become their ninth signing for the 2014 season. At Olimpia, his teammates included Julio Manzur, Salustiano Candia, Carlos Humberto Paredes, Derlis Gonzalez, Uruguayan midfielder Juan Manuel Salgueiro and former under-20 national team colleague Ronald Huth.

== International career ==
Paniagua was a member of the Paraguay national under-20 football team that participated in the 2009 FIFA U-20 World Cup in Egypt. During the tournament on 28 September, Paniagua contributed with a stoppage time goal to lead Paraguay to a 2–1 victory over Egypt at the Cairo International Stadium.
