= 2006–07 FA Premier Reserve League =

English football league season

The 2006–07 FA Premier Reserve League season was the eighth season of the Premier Reserve League since its establishment. Reigning champions of the Northern Division Manchester United had won two consecutive Northern Premier Reserve League titles and three in total but were looking to become the first side ever to win three consecutives seasons. Reigning champions of the Southern League Tottenham Hotspur were looking to match Derby County and Charlton Athletic by winning two consecutive Southern Reserve League titles.

Both failed to meet their objectives, with Bolton Wanderers winning the Northern Division on the final day with a 3–1 home win against Newcastle United, and Reading winning the Southern Division after a 4–0 win away to West Ham United.

The Premier Reserve League Play-off Final to determine the overall winner was contested between the two champions – Bolton and Reading – at the Madejski Stadium, with Reading winning the game 2–0 and being crowned overall reserve champions.

Watford, Charlton and Sheffield United's relegation from the senior league meant that, despite their performances in the reserve league, all three teams were relegated from the Premier Reserve League and replaced by the promoted teams Birmingham City, Derby County, and Sunderland for the 2007–08 season.

== League table ==
Reserve League North

Pos	Club	Pld	W	D	L	GF	GA	GD	Pts
1	Bolton Wanderers Reserves	18	10	3	5	21	16	+5	33
2	Manchester United Reserves	18	9	4	5	24	17	+7	31
3	Middlesbrough Reserves	18	9	3	6	31	25	+6	30
4	Manchester City Reserves	18	9	2	7	27	24	+3	29
5	Liverpool Reserves	18	8	2	8	24	19	+5	26
6	Blackburn Rovers Reserves	18	7	5	6	16	15	+1	26
7	Sheffield United Reserves	18	8	2	8	23	23	0	26
8	Newcastle United Reserves	18	6	5	7	29	29	0	23
9	Everton Reserves	18	3	7	8	18	25	−7	16
10	Wigan Athletic Reserves	18	2	5	11	8	28	−20	11

Reserve League South

Pos	Club	Pld	W	D	L	GF	GA	GD	Pts
1	Reading Reserves	18	12	2	4	45	15	+30	38
2	Watford Reserves	18	11	2	5	26	20	+6	35
3	Chelsea Reserves	18	10	3	5	26	11	+15	33
4	Aston Villa Reserves	18	9	3	6	38	26	+12	30
5	Tottenham Hotspur Reserves	18	8	6	4	22	18	+4	30
6	Charlton Athletic Reserves	18	7	4	7	28	24	+4	25
7	West Ham United Reserves	18	5	3	10	18	28	−10	18
8	Fulham Reserves	18	4	5	9	16	30	−14	17
9	Arsenal Reserves	18	4	4	10	15	29	−14	16
10	Portsmouth Reserves	18	2	4	12	12	44	−33	10

Pld = Matches played; W = Matches won; D = Matches drawn; L = Matches lost; F = Goals for; A = Goals against; GD = Goal difference; Pts = Points

== North/South Play-off Shield ==
11 May 2007

Reading Reserves	2–0	Bolton Wanderers Reserves
Alan Bennett 22'; Alex Pearce 48'	Report

Madejski Stadium, Reading
Attendance: 4,172
Referee: Howard Webb

== See also ==
- 2006–07 in English football
- 2006–07 FA Premier League
