= András Simon =

Hungarian footballer (born 1990)

Personal information
- Full name: András Simon
- Date of birth: 30 March 1990 (age 36)
- Place of birth: Salgótarján, Hungary
- Height: 1.83 m (6 ft 0 in)
- Position: Forward

Team information
- Current team: Csákvár
- Number: 17

Youth career
- 2003–2005: MTK Budapest

Senior career*
| Years | Team | Apps | (Gls) |
| 2005–2007 | MTK Budapest | 1 | (0) |
| 2007–2010 | Liverpool | 0 | (0) |
| 2009–2010 | → Córdoba (loan) | 9 | (0) |
| 2011 | Excelsior | 1 | (0) |
| 2011–2014 | Győr | 4 | (0) |
| 2012 | → Pápa (loan) | 5 | (0) |
| 2013–2014 | → Haladás (loan) | 0 | (0) |
| 2014 | → Kecskemét (loan) | 6 | (1) |
| 2014–2015 | Paks | 14 | (1) |
| 2015–2017 | Gyirmót | 65 | (22) |
| 2018–2019 | Paks | 39 | (6) |
| 2019–2020 | MTK Budapest | 16 | (3) |
| 2020 | Győr | 5 | (0) |
| 2020 | Haladás | 0 | (0) |
| 2020–2023 | Gyirmót | 93 | (14) |
| 2023– | Csákvár | 56 | (7) |

International career
| 2006–2007 | Hungary U17 | 7 | (4) |
| 2007–2008 | Hungary U18 | 8 | (3) |
| 2008 | Hungary U19 | 8 | (3) |
| 2008–2009 | Hungary U20 | 7 | (1) |
| 2009–2010 | Hungary U21 | 1 | (0) |
Medal record
Representing Hungary
Men's football
FIFA U-20 World Cup
| Third place | 2009 Egypt |
- * Club domestic league appearances and goals as of 31 May 2026

András Simon (Hungarian pronunciation: [ˈɒndraːʃ ˈʃimon]; born 30 March 1990) is a Hungarian footballer who plays for Csákvár in the Nemzeti Bajnokság II of Hungary. He is the twin brother of Ádám Simon, also a footballer.

== Career ==
Born in Salgótarján, Nógrád County, Simon signed for Liverpool from MTK Hungária in 2007 alongside Krisztián Németh.

On 21 August 2009, it was announced that Simon would spend the season on loan at Spanish club Córdoba CF, currently playing in the Segunda Division. He made his debut for Córdoba CF as a substitute in a 3–0 defeat by Real Betis on 30 August 2009. In December 2010 Simon disbanded his contract with Liverpool F.C. and joined Alemannia Aachen on a six-day trial. He played no first team games whilst at Liverpool. On 14 February he signed till the end of the 2010/11 season at Dutch Eredivisie side SBV Excelsior.

On 5 July 2011 Simon signed a four-year contract with Hungarian Division One club Győri ETO FC.

On 12 June 2019, MTK Budapest FC announced that Simon had returned to the club.

== International career ==
Simon has represented Hungary at Under-17, Under-18, Under-19, Under-20 and Under-21 levels.

== Honours ==
=== Clubs ===
- MTK Hungária FC
  - Hungarian League:
    - Runners-up: 2006–07
- Liverpool
  - Youth team
    - Dallas Cup winner: 2008
  - Reserves
    - Premier Reserve League National champion: 2007–08
    - Premier Reserve League North champion: 2007–08
    - Senior Cup: 2008–09

=== Hungary ===
- UEFA European Under-19 Championship:
  - Semi-finalist: 2008
- FIFA U-20 World Cup:
  - Third place: 2009
