= Central League (England) =

The Central League
- Founded: 1911
- Country: England Wales
- Divisions: 1
- Number of clubs: 10
- Current champions: Oxford United (2025–26)

The Central League is a football league for reserve teams, primarily from the English Football League.

The league was formed in 1911 and in its early years consisted of a mix of first teams and reserve teams from the North and the Midlands. However, when the Football League Third Division North was created in 1921, all the first teams in the Central League became founder members.

Since then, the league has been for reserve teams only, and eventually expanded to include virtually every professional team in the South, Midlands and North of England. Southern teams used to play in the Football Combination. In recent years, the Premier Reserve League was created for reserve sides of Premier League teams, and so the Central League's membership has been reduced.

From the 2006/07 English football season the FA Premier Reserve League was restricted to the reserve sides of FA Premier League clubs. This meant that the reserve sides of Championship clubs rejoined the Central League.

Teams are not promoted to the Premier Reserve League based on their final league position, but on the league position of their respective clubs' senior teams. If the senior team is promoted to the Premier League, then the reserve team is promoted to the Premier Reserve League and replaced by the reserve teams of the relegated clubs.

It was announced on 31 December 2013 that the Central League secured a sponsorship arrangement with Final Third Sports Media, and was known as the 'Final Third Development League' with immediate effect for two seasons. It was branded as the Final Third Development League until the 2015/16 season.

On 11 June 2014, it was announced that the league would expand to become a national competition by running a division in the south of the country for the 2014/15 season for the first time. The 2021–22 season was Northern only again, and only featured six teams, though the Central League Cup remained national. Wrexham joined for the 2022–23 season, despite not being in the EFL. Twelve teams entered in 2023–24, with them split into two leagues of six.

== Champions ==
=== 1911–2026 ===
1911–12	Lincoln City
1912–13	Manchester United
1913–14	Everton
1914–15	Huddersfield Town
1919–20	Blackpool
1920–21	Manchester United
1921–22	Sheffield United
1922–23	West Bromwich Albion
1923–24	West Bromwich Albion
1924–25	Huddersfield Town
1925–26	Huddersfield Town
1926–27	West Bromwich Albion
1927–28	Stoke City
1928–29	Sheffield Wednesday
1929–30	Aston Villa
1930–31	Huddersfield Town
1931–32	Wolverhampton Wanderers
1932–33	West Bromwich Albion
1933–34	West Bromwich Albion
1934–35	West Bromwich Albion
1935–36	Derby County
1936–37	Leeds United
1937–38	Everton
1938–39	Manchester United
1945–46	Sheffield Wednesday
1946–47	Manchester United
1947–48	Newcastle United
1948–49	Burnley
1949–50	Blackpool
1950–51	Wolverhampton Wanderers
1951–52	Wolverhampton Wanderers
1952–53	Wolverhampton Wanderers
1953–54	Everton
1954–55	Bolton Wanderers
1955–56	Manchester United

1956–57	Liverpool
1957–58	Wolverhampton Wanderers
1958–59	Wolverhampton Wanderers
1959–60	Manchester United
1960–61	Sheffield Wednesday
1961–62	Burnley
1962–63	Burnley
1963–64	Aston Villa
1964–65	Blackburn Rovers
1965–66	Sheffield United
1966–67	Blackburn Rovers
1967–68	Everton
1968–69	Liverpool
1969–70	Liverpool
1970–71	Liverpool
1971–72	Derby County
1972–73	Liverpool
1973–74	Liverpool
1974–75	Liverpool
1975–76	Liverpool
1976–77	Liverpool
1977–78	Manchester City
1978–79	Liverpool
1979–80	Liverpool
1980–81	Liverpool
1981–82	Liverpool
1982–83	West Bromwich Albion
1983–84	Liverpool
1984–85	Liverpool
1985–86	Derby County
1986–87	Manchester City
1987–88	Nottingham Forest
1988–89	Nottingham Forest
1989–90	Liverpool
1990–91	Sheffield Wednesday

1991–92	Nottingham Forest
1992–93	Aston Villa
1993–94	Manchester United
1994–95	Bolton Wanderers
1995–96	Manchester United
1996–97	Manchester United
1997–98	Leeds United
1998–99	Sunderland
1999–00	Manchester City
2000–01	Tranmere Rovers
2001–02	Preston North End
2002–03	Sheffield United
2003–04	Stoke City
2004–05	Hull City
2005–06+	Doncaster Rovers
2006-07+	Nottingham Forest
2007-08+	Manchester City
2008-09^	Shrewsbury Town
2009-10^	Wrexham
2010-11^	Preston North End
2011-12^	Middlesbrough
2012-13~	Shrewsbury Town
2013-14~	Hull City
2014-15^	Hull City
2015–16^	Notts County
2016–17^	Walsall
2017–18^	Port Vale
2018–19~	Milton Keynes Dons
2019–20^	(not completed)
2020–21	(not played)
2021–22	Preston North End
2022–23	Accrington Stanley
2023–24~	(not completed)
2024–25	Derby County
2025–26	Oxford United

+ - Three divisions, overall winner decided after a series of play-offs. ^ - Three divisions, overall winner is the team with the best points per game ratio. ~ - Two divisions, overall winner is the team with the best points per game ratio.

- - Four divisions, overall winner is the team with the best points per game ratio.

=== Championships by club ===
P	Club	Number of Wins
1	Liverpool	16
2	Manchester United	9
3	West Bromwich Albion	7
4	Wolverhampton Wanderers	6
5	Derby County	4
	Everton	4
	Huddersfield Town	4
	Manchester City	4
	Nottingham Forest	4
	Sheffield Wednesday	4
11	Aston Villa	3
	Burnley	3
	Hull City	3
	Preston North End	3
	Sheffield United	3
16	Blackburn Rovers	2
	Blackpool	2
	Bolton Wanderers	2
	Leeds United	2
	Stoke City	2
	Shrewsbury Town	2
22	Accrington Stanley	1
	Doncaster Rovers	1
	Lincoln City	1
	Middlesbrough	1
	Milton Keynes Dons	1
	Newcastle United	1
	Notts County	1
	Oxford United	1
	Port Vale	1
	Sunderland	1
	Tranmere Rovers	1
	Walsall	1
	Wrexham	1

== Central League Cup ==
Since 1996 the league has also operated a cup competition – The Central League Cup.

=== Winners ===
Season	Winners
1996–97	Stoke City
1997–98	Sheffield United
1998–99	Tranmere Rovers
1999–00	
2000–01	Sheffield United
2001–02	Doncaster Rovers
2002–03	Hull City
2003–04	Sheffield Wednesday
2004–05	Manchester United
2005–06	Shrewsbury Town
2006–07	Lincoln City
2007–08	Morecambe
2008–09	Sunderland
2009–10	Leicester City
2010–11	Sunderland
2011–12	(not completed)
2012–13	Gateshead
2013–14	Wigan Athletic
2014–15	Middlesbrough
2015–16	North: Burnley; South: Southend United
2016–17	North: Wigan Athletic; South: Bristol City
2017–18	North: Mansfield Town; South: Southend United
2018–19	Bournemouth
2019–20	(not completed)
2020–21	Bournemouth
2021–22	(not completed)
2022–23	Blackpool
2023–24	Burnley
2024–25	Mansfield Town
2025–26	Wigan Athletic

== See also ==
- The Football Combination
- Premier Reserve League
- English Football League Youth Alliance
- English Football League
