= Damien Plessis =

French footballer (born 1988)

Personal information
- Full name: Damien Jérôme Jean-Richard Plessis
- Date of birth: 5 March 1988 (age 38)
- Place of birth: Neuville-aux-Bois, France
- Height: 1.92 m (6 ft 4 in)
- Position: Defensive midfielder

Youth career
- 1994–2001: Deportivo Espagnol Orléans
- 2001–2002: Saint-Jean-de-la-Ruelle
- 2002–2004: Orléans
- 2004–2007: Lyon

Senior career*
Years	Team	Apps	(Gls)
2007–2010	Liverpool	3	(0)
2010–2012	Panathinaikos	9	(0)
2012	→ Doncaster Rovers (loan)	0	(0)
2012–2014	Arles-Avignon	40	(0)
2014	Lausanne-Sport	13	(0)
2014–2016	Châteauroux	32	(1)
2016	Marítimo	9	(1)
2017	Örebro SK	5	(0)
2018	AS Capricorne		

International career
2008	France U21	1	(0)
- * Club domestic league appearances and goals

Damien Jérôme Jean-Richard Plessis (born 5 March 1988) is a French professional footballer who last played for Örebro SK in the Swedish Allsvenskan. He is also the younger brother of professional footballer Guillaume Plessis.

== Club career ==
=== Lyon ===
Born in Neuville-aux-Bois of Réunionnais origin, Plessis started his career at Olympique Lyonnais. Plessis signed for Lyon at the age of 15, and was considered to be one of the team's most promising youngsters, following in the footsteps of Karim Benzema and Hatem Ben Arfa.

=== Liverpool ===
Plessis signed a three-year contract for Liverpool on the last day of the transfer window in August 2007. He initially played for the reserve team, with which he won the reserves league in 2008. Liverpool manager Rafael Benítez said of Plessis after having signed him, "He is a good player, big and strong, and we're sure he'll do well for us. He's only a young boy with plenty of time to work on his game but it depends on his progress how quickly he can force his way into the first team".

Plessis made his debut for Liverpool on 5 April 2008 in the 1–1 away draw against Arsenal. Rafa Benítez described his performance by saying "Today was the debut for Damien Plessis. We knew when we signed him that he was a quality player. He's played really well for the reserves, and to play as well as he did today in this stadium, it shows we are going in the right direction and in time he will be fighting with the likes of Gerrard and Spearing for a first team place."

For the start of the 2008–2009 season Plessis was given the number 28 shirt. He made his debut in the UEFA Champions League during a game against Standard Liège. He also started the first match of the season against Sunderland but only played 45 minutes because of a knock, and fellow midfielder Xabi Alonso came on to replace him.

On 23 September 2008, Plessis played in the League Cup game against Crewe Alexandra. He scored his first senior goal for the club in a League Cup match against Tottenham Hotspur on 12 November 2008 when he headed down a corner from Ryan Babel.

Plessis signed a two-and-a-half-year extension to his Liverpool contract, in October 2009, that would have kept him at Anfield until 2012.

On 12 August 2010, Plessis' shirt number, 28, was taken by new signing Christian Poulsen.

=== Panathinaikos ===
On 31 August 2010, Panathinaikos bought the player from Liverpool on an undisclosed fee. He signed with the club as a promising player, but his performances were below par and never satisfied his manager Jesualdo Ferreira. This way he did not manage to get much playing time, finishing the season with just 9 appearances for the club. At the end of the season he was expected to leave the club since he was not part of the manager's plans for the following season.

In July 2011, Plessis went on trial with Leicester City. However, Sven Goran Eriksson confirmed that the trial was not very successful and quite a short one. He was later rumoured to be in talks with 2. Bundesliga sides Ingolstadt 04 and 1860 Munich. Eventually he didn't reach an agreement with any team and stayed at Panathinaikos.

==== Loan to Doncaster Rovers ====
On 23 December 2011, Doncaster Rovers signed Plessis on loan until the end of the season. He hoped to use the switch as a springboard to winning a move back to the Premier League. However, he never made a first team appearance for the club and was subsequently released in May 2012. On 4 July 2012, Panathinaikos also terminated his contract after two years of sub-par performances for the club.

=== Arles-Avignon ===
In July 2012, Plessis joined French Ligue 2 side AC Arles-Avignon on a two-year contract. There he managed to resurrect his floundering career and he became a first team regular.

=== Lausanne-Sport ===
In January 2014, it was announced Plessis joined Swiss Super League side Lausanne-Sport on a six-month deal with an option for a further year.

=== Châteauroux ===
In August 2014, Plessis agreed a three-year contract with LB Châteauroux in Ligue 2

=== Örebro SK ===
In March 2017, Plessis agreed a two-year contract with Örebro SK in Allsvenskan He became a free agent in September 2017.

=== AS Capricorne ===
Plessis joined AS Capricorne of the Réunion Premier League in February 2018. He left the club in August.

== International career ==
Plessis was a member of the French under-19 team which reached the semi-finals of the 2007 UEFA European Under-19 Football Championship in Austria. He is also a former France under-21 international.

== Career statistics ==
Appearances and goals by club, season and competition
Club	Season	League			National cup		League cup		Continental		Total	
Club	Season	Division	Apps	Goals	Apps	Goals	Apps	Goals	Apps	Goals	Apps	Goals
Liverpool	2007–08	Premier League	2	0	0	0	0	0	0	0	2	0
Liverpool	2008–09	Premier League	1	0	0	0	2	1	2	0	5	1
Liverpool	2009–10	Premier League	0	0	0	0	1	0	0	0	1	0
Liverpool	Total		3	0	0	0	3	1	2	0	8	1
Panathinaikos	2010–11	Super League Greece	4	0	2	0	—	—	3	0	9	0
Panathinaikos	2011–12	Super League Greece	0	0	0	0	—	—	0	0	0	0
Panathinaikos	Total		4	0	2	0	—	—	3	0	9	0
Doncaster Rovers	2011–12	Championship	0	0	0	0	0	0	0	0	0	0
Arles-Avignon	2012–13	Ligue 2	32	0	2	0	4	0	—	—	38	0
Arles-Avignon	2013–14	Ligue 2	8	0	1	0	2	0	—	—	11	0
Arles-Avignon	Total		40	0	3	0	6	0	0	0	49	0
Lausanne-Sport	2013–14	Swiss Super League	13	0	0	0	0	0	—	—	13	0
Châteauroux	2014–15	Ligue 2	30	1	4	1	1	0	—	—	35	2
Châteauroux	2015–16	National	2	0	1	0	0	0	—	—	3	0
Châteauroux	Total		32	1	5	1	1	0	0	0	38	2
Marítimo	2015–16	Primeira Liga	9	1	0	0	1	0	—	—	10	1
Örebro SK	2017	Allsvenskan	5	0	1	0	1	0	—	—	6	0
Career total			106	2	11	1	11	1	5	0	133	4
