= Neuville-aux-Bois =

- Commune
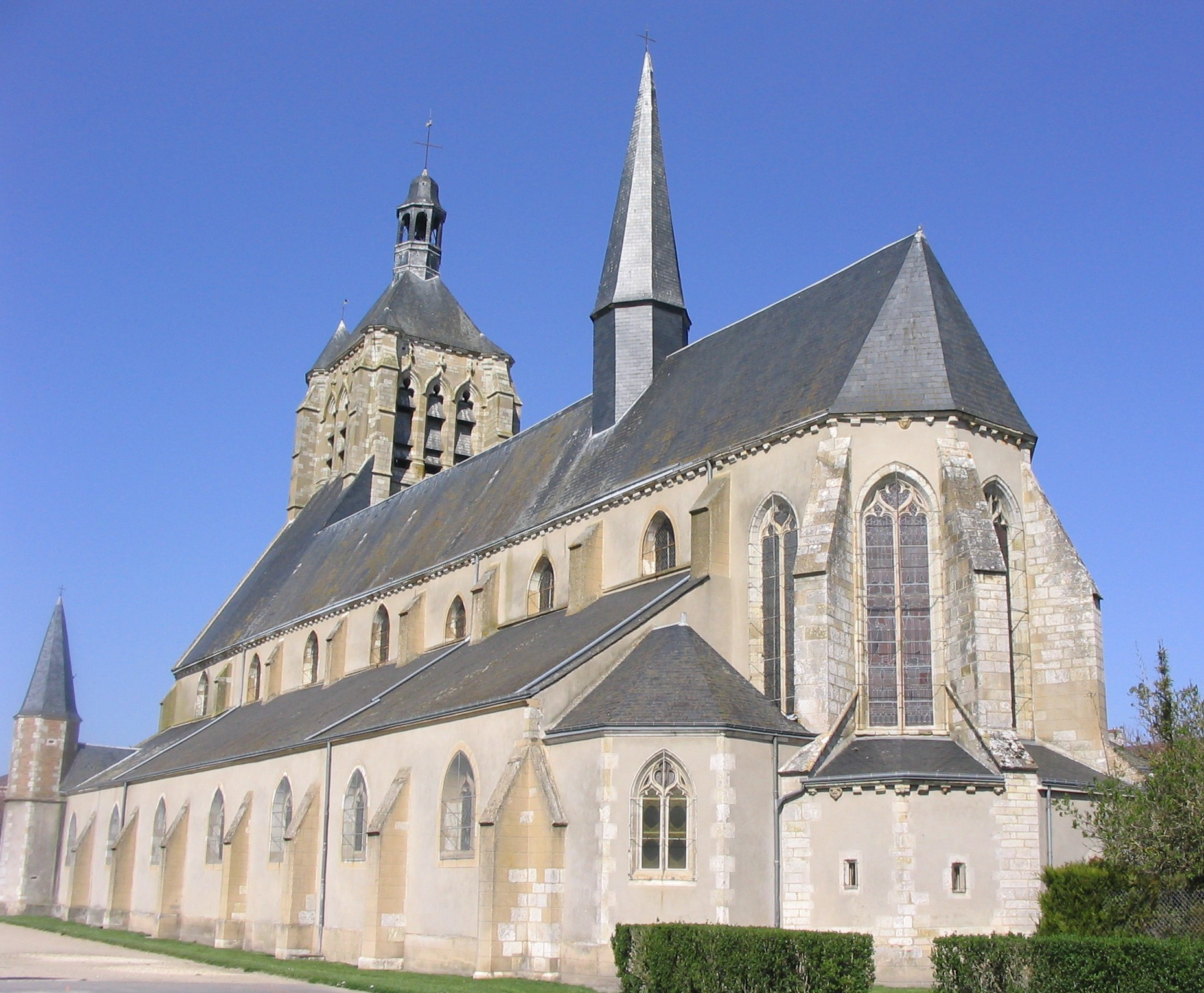
- Saint-Symphorien church

- Coat of arms
- Location of Neuville-aux-Bois
- Location within France Location within Centre-Val de Loire
- Coordinates: 48°04′15″N 2°03′17″E
- Country: France
- Region: Centre-Val de Loire
- Department: Loiret
- Arrondissement: Orléans
- Canton: Pithiviers
- Intercommunality: CC de la Forêt

Government
  - Mayor (2020–2026): Patrick Hardouin
- Area^{1}: 31.74 km^{2} (12.25 sq mi)
- Highest elevation: 142 m (466 ft)
- Lowest elevation: 118 m (387 ft)
- Population (2023): 4,987
  - Density: 157.1/km^{2} (406.9/sq mi)
- Demonym: Neuvillois
- Time zone: UTC+01:00 (CET)
  - Summer (DST): UTC+02:00 (CEST)
- INSEE/Postal code: 45224 /45170
- Website: www.ville-neuvilleauxbois.fr
- ^{1} French Land Register data, which excludes lakes, ponds, glaciers > 1 km^{2} (0.386 sq mi or 247 acres) and river estuaries.

Neuville-aux-Bois (French pronunciation: [nøvil o bwa]) is a commune in the Loiret department in north-central France.

== Population ==
Historical population
Year	Pop.	±% p.a.
1968	2,809	—
1975	3,288	+2.27%
1982	3,593	+1.28%
1990	3,870	+0.93%
1999	3,874	+0.01%
2007	4,005	+0.42%
2012	4,228	+1.09%
2017	4,714	+2.20%
2023	4,987	+0.94%
Source: INSEE

== Notable people ==
- Damien Plessis, footballer

== See also ==
- Communes of the Loiret department
