= Dejan Filipović =

Serbian electrical engineer (born 1968)

Dejan Sokol Filipovic (born 1968) is a Serbian engineer.

Filipovic earned his Diplom in electrical engineering from the University of Niš in 1994 and continued graduate level study in the subject at the University of Michigan in the United States, completing a master's degree in 1999, followed by a doctorate in 2002. Filipovic remained in the US, joining the University of Colorado Boulder faculty as an assistant professor, became an associate professor in 2009, and assumed a full professorship in 2015. He holds the Hudson Moore Jr. Chair in Engineering.
