= 2007–08 Premier Academy League =

Premier Academy League
- Season: 2007–08
- Champions: Aston Villa U18s (1st title)
- Relegated: Millwall U18s
- Goals: 1,866
- Average goals/game: 3.23
- Biggest home win: Arsenal U18s 6-0 Cardiff City U18s, Newcastle United U18s 6-0 Barnsley U18s, Tottenham Hotspur U18s 6-0 Southampton U18s
- Biggest away win: Watford U18s 0-7 Manchester City U18s
- Highest scoring: Leicester City U18s 3-5 Tottenham Hotspur U18s, Watford U18s 1-7 Arsenal U18s
- Longest winning run: 10, Tottenham Hotspur U18s
- Longest unbeaten run: 15, Sunderland U18s
- Longest losing run: 7, Barnsley U18s

The 2007–08 Premier Academy League season is the tenth since its establishment, and the fourth under the current name and make-up. Aston Villa were crowned the 2007–08 Premier Academy League Champions after beating Manchester City 2–0 in the play-off Final, with goals from James Collins and Chris Herd.

== Structure ==
=== Group A ===
Norwich City, Southampton and West Ham United play 20 group fixtures each, twice against all of the other teams in Group A. They also play 8 inter-group fixtures, against teams from Group B, C and D. The remaining 8 teams in the group, play 21 group fixtures - which means a single fixture in the group will be the third meeting between the teams in the season - and 7 inter-group games. Thus producing 28 games a season for all 11 teams.

=== Groups B, C and D ===
All teams play each other in the group twice, producing 18 games. They also play 10 inter-group fixtures.

== Final league tables ==
=== Academy Group A ===
Pos	Club	Pld	W	D	L	F	A	GD	Pts
1	Arsenal U18s (C)	28	17	5	6	74	31	+43	56
2	West Ham United U18s	28	16	3	9	63	38	+25	51
3	Fulham U18s	28	14	7	7	39	28	+11	49
4	Portsmouth U18s	28	15	4	9	44	44	0	49
5	Crystal Palace U18s	28	14	5	9	59	41	+18	47
6	Southampton U18s	28	13	4	11	43	52	-9	43
7	Chelsea U18s	28	11	6	11	58	52	+6	39
8	Charlton Athletic U18s	28	9	8	11	47	51	-4	35
9	Ipswich Town U18s	28	9	5	14	39	53	-14	32
10	Norwich City U18s	28	6	9	13	45	56	-11	27
11	Millwall U18s (R)	28	4	6	18	30	64	-34	18

=== Academy Group B ===
Pos	Club	Pld	W	D	L	F	A	GD	Pts
1	Aston Villa U18s (C)	28	22	2	4	84	33	+51	68
2	Tottenham Hotspur U18s	28	18	5	5	69	35	+34	59
3	Leicester City U18s	28	18	4	6	70	41	+29	58
4	Reading U18s	28	13	5	10	40	42	-2	44
5	Bristol City U18s	28	11	5	12	50	51	-1	38
6	Milton Keynes Dons U18s	28	9	2	17	33	54	-21	29
7	Watford U18s	28	7	6	15	30	54	-24	27
8	Birmingham City U18s	28	5	8	14	31	54	-23	23
9	Coventry City U18s	28	4	6	18	31	58	-27	18
10	Cardiff City U18s	28	3	7	18	30	68	-38	16

=== Academy Group C ===
Pos	Club	Pld	W	D	L	F	A	GD	Pts
1	Manchester City U18s (C)	28	21	4	3	75	22	+53	67
2	Everton U18s	28	17	7	4	56	24	+32	58
3	Manchester United U18s	28	14	6	8	47	44	+3	48
4	Crewe Alexandra U18s	28	14	6	8	50	51	-1	48
5	Liverpool U18s	28	11	10	7	49	34	+15	43
6	Blackburn Rovers U18s	28	10	5	13	36	40	-2	35
7	West Bromwich Albion U18s	28	8	7	13	44	66	-22	31
8	Wolverhampton Wanderers U18s	28	7	8	13	29	37	-8	29
9	Bolton Wanderers U18s	28	6	9	13	42	47	-5	27
10	Stoke City U18s	28	6	7	15	28	42	-14	25

=== Academy Group D ===
Pos	Club	Pld	W	D	L	F	A	GD	Pts
1	Sunderland U18s (C)	28	20	3	5	68	31	+37	63
2	Nottingham Forest U18s	28	16	5	7	58	42	+16	53
3	Leeds United U18s	28	13	6	9	53	38	+15	45
4	Middlesbrough U18s	28	11	9	8	39	37	+2	42
5	Sheffield United U18s	28	10	6	12	33	34	-1	36
6	Huddersfield Town U18s	28	9	7	12	30	42	-12	34
7	Derby County U18s	28	10	2	16	26	53	-27	32
8	Newcastle United U18s	28	7	6	15	41	49	-8	27
9	Sheffield Wednesday U18s	28	5	7	16	24	53	-29	22
10	Barnsley U18s	28	3	4	21	20	73	-53	13

Pld = Matches played; W = Matches won; D = Matches drawn; L = Matches lost; F = Goals for; A = Goals against; GD = Goal difference; Pts = Points
C = Champions; R = Relegated

== Play-offs ==
=== Semi-finals ===
26 April 2008
13:00

Aston Villa U18s	1–0	Arsenal U18s
Nathan Delfouneso 47'	(Report)

Villa Park, Birmingham
Referee: K. Hayward

28 April 2008
19:00

Manchester City U18s	4–2	Sunderland U18s
Dedryck Boyata 49'; Donal McDermott 59'; Ryan McGivern 61'; Kieran Trippier 90+2' (pen.)	(Report)	Liam Noble 57'; Nathan Luscombe 66'

Manchester Regional Arena, Manchester
Referee: S. Bond

=== Final ===
4 May 2008
12:00

Aston Villa U18s	2–0	Manchester City U18s
James Collins 23'; Chris Herd 34'	(Report)

Villa Park, Birmingham
Referee: G. Muge

== See also ==
- 2007–08 in English football
- Premier League 2007-08
- Premier Reserve League 2007-08
