= Jordy Brouwer =

Dutch footballer (born 1988)

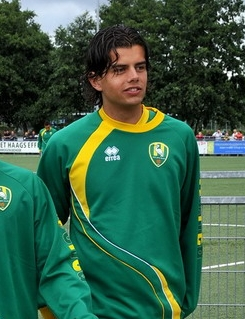
- Jordy Brouwer in 2011

Personal information
- Date of birth: 26 February 1988 (age 38)
- Place of birth: The Hague, Netherlands
- Height: 1.88 m (6 ft 2 in)
- Position: Striker

Youth career
- 1995–2000: GDA
- 2000–2003: ADO Den Haag
- 2003–2007: Ajax
- 2007–2008: Liverpool

Senior career*
Years	Team	Apps	(Gls)
2008–2011	Liverpool	0	(0)
2009	→ RKC (loan)	5	(0)
2011	ADO Den Haag	3	(1)
2012	Almere City	2	(0)
2012–2013	HBS	14	(7)
2013–2019	DHC	16	(4)

International career
2004	Netherlands U17	4	(1)
2006-2007	Netherlands U19	8	(2)
2007	Netherlands U20	2	(0)
- * Club domestic league appearances and goals

Jordy Brouwer (born 26 February 1988) is a Dutch retired footballer who plays for DHC Delft.

== Club career ==
Born in The Hague, Brouwer moved from Ajax to English side Liverpool in January 2007. After impressive form for the Liverpool Reserves – including scoring a goal in the Premier Reserve League play-off final in May 2008. He looked set to join FC Utrecht after a season long loan deal was agreed in August 2008, but the deal never materialised.

He eventually left on loan for RKC Waalwijk in January 2009, until the end of the 2008–09 season, making five league appearances for the first team.

In December 2010, Brouwer went on trial at ADO Den Haag, signing a contract with the club in January 2011 until the summer of 2012. He left the club in October 2011 when the player and club agreed a mutual termination of the contract.

In February 2012 he joined Almere City, before moving to HBS Craeyenhout at the start of the 2012–13 season. The striker played 14 games during the 2012/2013 season HBS Craeyenhout and scored seven goals, before signed with DHC Delft in June 2013.

== International career ==
Brouwer played 4 games for the Netherlands national under-17 football team and 8 for the Netherlands U19s.

== Controversy ==
In February 2013, tens of kilos of cannabis were found in the basement of Brouwers' house. He was cleared from all charges in June 2014.

After retiring as a player, Brouwer started a career as a poker player.
