= 2007–08 Premier Reserve League =

Premier Reserve League
- Season: 2007–08
- Champions: Liverpool Reserves
- Goals: 510
- Average goals/game: 2.82
- Top goalscorer: (Hungary) Krisztián Németh (Liverpool Reserves, 9 goals)
- Biggest home win: Reading Reserves 5–0 Derby County Reserves (February 13)
- Biggest away win: Derby County 0–8 West Ham United Reserves (November 26)
- Highest scoring: Derby County Reserves 0–8 West Ham United Reserves (November 26)
- Longest winning run: 7 (Liverpool Reserves, February 26–May 7)
- Longest unbeaten run: 16 (Liverpool Reserves, October 11–May 7)
- Longest losing run: 12 (Derby County Reserves October 22–April 14)
- Highest attendance: 10,546 (Liverpool Reserves v Manchester United Reserves, February 26)

The 2007–08 Premier Reserve League season is the ninth since its establishment. The events in the senior leagues during the 2006–07 season saw Watford, Charlton Athletic and Sheffield United all relegated and replaced by the promoted teams Birmingham City, Derby County and Sunderland.

Northern Champions Liverpool beat Southern Champions Aston Villa 3–0 in the Premier Reserve League Play-off Final and were crowned the National Champions.

== Final league tables ==
=== Premier Reserve League North ===
Pos	Club	Pld	W	D	L	F	A	GD	Pts
1	Liverpool Reserves (C)	18	13	4	1	31	8	+23	43
2	Manchester City Reserves	18	8	6	4	34	29	+5	30
3	Manchester United Reserves	18	8	5	5	25	19	+6	29
4	Sunderland Reserves	18	9	2	7	28	24	+4	29
5	Blackburn Rovers Reserves	18	8	4	6	32	25	+7	28
6	Newcastle United Reserves	18	5	7	6	31	27	+4	22
7	Middlesbrough Reserves	18	5	7	6	23	26	-3	22
8	Everton Reserves	18	4	4	10	21	31	-10	16
9	Wigan Athletic Reserves	18	4	3	11	19	36	-17	15
10	Bolton Wanderers Reserves	18	3	4	11	13	32	-19	13

=== Premier Reserve League South ===
Pos	Club	Pld	W	D	L	F	A	GD	Pts
1	Aston Villa Reserves (C)	18	10	5	3	38	17	+21	35
2	Reading Reserves	18	8	7	3	32	16	+16	31
3	West Ham United Reserves	18	9	4	5	32	21	+11	31
4	Arsenal Reserves	18	8	6	4	26	17	+9	30
5	Fulham Reserves	18	8	4	6	27	25	+2	28
6	Chelsea Reserves	18	5	7	6	23	21	+2	22
7	Birmingham City Reserves	18	6	4	8	25	33	-8	22
8	Tottenham Hotspur Reserves	18	5	6	7	22	24	-2	21
9	Portsmouth Reserves	18	5	4	9	12	25	-13	19
10	Derby County Reserves	18	1	3	14	13	51	-38	6

Pld = Matches played; W = Matches won; D = Matches drawn; L = Matches lost; GD = Goal difference; Pts = Points
C = Champions

== Play-off Final ==
7 May 2008
19:45 BST

Liverpool Reserves	3–0	Aston Villa Reserves
Krisztián Németh 10'; Jordy Brouwer 66'; Lucas Leiva 76'	(Report)

Anfield, Liverpool
Attendance: 7,580
Referee: Mark Clattenburg (Tyne & Wear)

== Relegated and Promoted teams ==
These three teams were relegated from the Premier Reserve League at the end of this season:

- Derby County (South)
- Birmingham City (South)
- Reading (South)

These three teams will promote to the Premier Reserve League at the start of next season:

- West Bromwich Albion (South)
- Stoke City (South)
- Hull City (North)

== Top scorers ==
=== Premier Reserve League North ===
Scorer	Goals	Team
(Hungary) Krisztián Németh	9	Liverpool
(Netherlands) Jordy Brouwer	8	Liverpool
(England) Ashley Grimes	7	Manchester City
(England) Andy Carroll	7	Newcastle United
(Republic of Ireland) Alan Judge	7	Blackburn Rovers

=== Premier Reserve League South ===
Scorer	Goals	Team
(Sweden) Tobias Mikaelsson	8	Aston Villa

== See also ==
- 2007–08 in English football
- 2007–08 Premier League
- 2007–08 Premier Academy League
