= Premier Reserve League =

- Founded: 1999
- Folded: 2012
- Country: England
- Divisions: 2
- Number of clubs: 16
- Level on pyramid: 1
- Relegation to: Central League (North); Football Combination (South)
- Last champions: Manchester United Reserves (2011–12)

The Premier Reserve League (officially known as The Barclays Premier Reserve League for sponsorship reasons) was the reserve team league for the top English football teams in the Premier League. The league was split into a northern and a southern division.

The league started out in 1999, replacing The Central League in the north and The Football Combination in the south as the top level of reserve-team football, although those competitions continued for lower-level teams and from 2004 to 2005, the regional champions would play-off for the title.

From the 2006–07 edition until its disbandment, the league was only open to sides whose senior teams were one of the 20 members of the Premier League. As a result, a senior team's relegation from the Premier League would mean relegation for the reserve team from the Premier Reserve League and replacement by the reserve team of the promoted team from the Championship.

Tottenham Hotspur decided against entering a side for the 2009–10 Premier Reserve League season and other teams followed suit in the 2 following seasons. The final season was the 2011–12 season. At the end of that season, it was replaced by an under-21 competition, called the Professional Development League 1.

== Winners ==
Season	Northern Champions	Southern Champions	Play-off Final Winners
1999–2000	Liverpool Reserves	Derby County Reserves	–
2000–01	Everton Reserves	Derby County Reserves	–
2001–02	Manchester United Reserves	Ipswich Town Reserves	–
2002–03	Sunderland Reserves	Watford Reserves	–
2003–04	Aston Villa Reserves	Charlton Athletic Reserves	–
2004–05	Manchester United Reserves	Charlton Athletic Reserves	Manchester United Reserves
2005–06	Manchester United Reserves	Tottenham Hotspur Reserves	Manchester United Reserves
2006–07	Bolton Wanderers Reserves	Reading Reserves	Reading Reserves
2007–08	Liverpool Reserves	Aston Villa Reserves	Liverpool Reserves
2008–09	Sunderland Reserves	Aston Villa Reserves	Aston Villa Reserves
2009–10	Manchester United Reserves	Aston Villa Reserves	Manchester United Reserves
2010–11	Blackburn Rovers Reserves	Chelsea Reserves	Chelsea Reserves
2011–12	Manchester United Reserves	Aston Villa Reserves	Manchester United Reserves

From 2004-05 the League instigated a play-off between the champions of the two sections. In that first season Northern Champions Manchester United Reserves beat Southern Champions Charlton Athletic Reserves 4–2 at The Valley. In the 2005–06 play-off, held at Old Trafford, Manchester United Reserves beat Tottenham Hotspur Reserves 2–0. The 2007 final, held at the Madejski Stadium, Reading beat Bolton 2–0. Liverpool Reserves beat Aston Villa Reserves 3–0 in the 2008 final at Anfield. Aston Villa reached the final again next season and beat Sunderland 3–1 at Villa Park. In the 2009–10 play-off match, held again at Old Trafford, Manchester United beat Aston Villa 3–2 in a penalty shoot-out after the game ended 3–3. In the 2010–11 playoff match, Chelsea defeated Blackburn 5–4 in a penalty shoot-out, after the game ended 1–1 at Stamford Bridge. In the 2011–12 season finale held at Old Trafford, Manchester United Reserves beat Aston Villa Reserves 3–1 on penalties after the game ended 0–0 in normal time.

=== Most successful clubs ===
Team	Regional titles	National titles
Manchester United Reserves	5	4
Aston Villa Reserves	5	1
Liverpool Reserves	2	1
Chelsea Reserves	1	1
Reading Reserves	1	1
Sunderland Reserves	2	0
Derby County Reserves	2	0
Charlton Athletic Reserves	2	0
Blackburn Rovers Reserves	1	0
Tottenham Hotspur Reserves	1	0
Bolton Wanderers Reserves	1	0
Everton Reserves	1	0
Ipswich Town Reserves	1	0
Watford Reserves	1	0

== See also ==
- Premier Academy League
- Premier League
- The Central League
- The Football Combination
