= Leyba =

Leyba is a surname. Notable people with the surname include:

- Domingo Leyba
- Fernando de Leyba
- Faith Leyba
- Gloria Leyba
- Hope Leyba

== See also ==
- Leiba
- Leyva
- Leiva
