= Leyva =

Leyva is a name of Spanish origin. It is a variant of Leiva.

== Middle name ==
- Edgardo Leyva Escandon, Mexican national and career criminal
- Herman Leyva Marques (1934–2006), professional boxer

== Family name ==
- Alfredo Beltrán Leyva (born 1960), incarcerated Mexican drug lord with the Beltrán-Leyva Cartel
- Arturo Beltrán Leyva (1961–2009), the leader of the Mexico drug trafficking organization known as the Beltrán-Leyva Cartel
- Brother Tony Leyva (1946–2005), Pentecostal preacher and convicted pederast and child molester
- Bryan Leyva, Mexican footballer who currently plays for Major League Soccer club FC Dallas
- Diego Lainez Leyva, (born 2000) Mexican national footballer
- Carlos Beltrán Leyva (born 1969), incarcerated Mexican drug lord with the Beltrán-Leyva Cartel
- Danell Leyva (born 1991), Cuban-American gymnast
- Fátima Leyva (born 1980), Mexican footballer
- Héctor Beltrán Leyva, Mexican drug lord and leader of the Beltrán Leyva Cartel
- Ivett Leyva, Mexican-born American aerospace engineer
- James Andrew Leyva (born 1991), American drag queen known as Valentina
- Mario René Díaz Leyva (born 1951), Cuban photographer
- Nick Leyva (born 1953), the current third base coach of the Pittsburgh Pirates
- Olivia Leyva (1948–2019), Mexican actress, television presenter and model
- Pío Leyva (1917–2006), Cuban singer and the author of the well-known guaracha El Mentiroso
- Roberto Carlos Leyva (born 1979), Mexican boxer in the Bantamweight division
- Richard DeLeon Leyva (born 1950), U.S Patent Holder
- Fashawn (born 1988), Given name Santiago Leyva, an American Rapper
- Selenis Leyva (born 1972), American actress
- Teresa Leyva (born 1965), Colombian chess player
- Victor Leyva (born 1977), Mexican guard in American football, who is currently a free agent

de Leyva

- Antonio de Leyva, Duke of Terranova (1480–1536), Spanish general during the Italian Wars
- Diego de Leyva (1580–1637), Spanish painter
- Juan de Leyva de la Cerda, conde de Baños (1604–1678), Spanish nobleman and viceroy of New Spain
- Marianna de Leyva y Marino, The Nun of Monza, (1575–1650), Italian nun
- Sinaloa de Leyva, city in the Mexican state of Sinaloa
- Villa de Leyva, colonial town and municipality, in the Boyacá department of Colombia, part of the subregion of the Ricaurte Province

y Leyva

- Diego de Covarrubias y Leyva (1512–1577), Spanish jurist and bishop of Segovia

== Others ==
- Beltrán-Leyva Cartel, Mexican drug cartel and organized crime syndicate founded by the four Beltrán Leyva brothers: Marcos Arturo, Carlos, Alfredo and Héctor

== See also ==
- Leiva (disambiguation)
