= Leiva =

Leiva may refer to:

- Leiva, Nariño, a municipality and town in the Nariño Department, Colombia
- Leiva, Boyacá, a municipality in Boyacá Department, Colombia, largest town Villa de Leyva
- Leiva River, a river in Chile
- Leiva, La Rioja, a municipality in La Rioja, Spain
- Leiva (singer) (born 1980), Spanish singer, songwriter and musician

== People with the surname ==
- Alberto Aguilar Leiva (born 1984), or simply known as Alberto, Spanish football (soccer) player
- Andrés Díaz Venero de Leiva (died 1578), first president of the New Kingdom of Granada, appointed in 1564
- Andrés Felipe Arias Leiva (born 1973), Colombian economist and minister
- Antonio de Leyva, Duke of Terranova (1480–1536), Spanish general during the Italian Wars
- Cristian Leiva (born 1977), Argentine football (soccer) player
- David Leiva (born 1978), Argentine singer and politician
- Francisco Leiva (1630–1676), dramatist of the Spanish Golden Age
- Gianmarco Leiva (born 1995), Peruvian chess master
- José María Sánchez Leiva (born 1985), Chilean football (soccer) player
- Lucas Leiva (born 1987), Brazilian football (soccer) player
- Maria Aracely Leiva (born 1967), Honduran politician
- Martín Leiva (born 1980), Argentine basketball player
- Miriam Leiva, Cuban-American mathematics educator
- Ponciano Leiva (1821–1896), President of Honduras in late 1800s
- Ronaldo Cecilio Leiva, Guatemalan military officer, minister
- Salvador Dubois Leiva (1935–2015), Nicaraguan football (soccer) player

== See also ==
- Leivinha (1949–2026), Brazilian football (soccer) player
- Leyva (disambiguation), disambiguation page
