= Mario Díaz =

Mario Díaz may refer to:

- Mario Díaz (baseball) (born 1962), Major League Baseball infielder
- Mario Díaz (discus thrower) (born 1999), Cuban discus thrower
- Mario Díaz Martínez (born 1965), Spanish member of the World Scout Committee
- Mario Díaz (footballer, born 1960), Mexican football manager for Atletico Valladolid and former midfielder
- Mario Díaz (footballer, born 1961), Mexican football striker

== See also ==
- Mario Díaz-Balart (born 1961), member of the U.S. House of Representatives from Florida
- Mario René Díaz Leyva (born 1951), Cuban photographer
