= Leiba =

Leiba is a given name and a surname of Jewish origin, a variant of Leib. Notable people with the surname include:

== Surname ==
- Barry Leiba (born 1957), American computer scientist
- Raw Leiba, American actor

== Given name ==
- Avram Leiba Zissu (1888-1956), Jewish Romanian writer, political essayist, industrialist, Jewish community activist
- Leiba Dobrovskii (1910-1969), Jewish Ukrainian soldier of the Soviet Red Army who was captured prisoner, hid his ethnic identity, escaped, and joined the Ukrainian Insurgent Army
- Leiba Feldbin, birth name of Alexander Orlov (Soviet defector)
- Ştrul Leiba Croitoru, birth name of Ion Călugăru (1902-1956), Jewish Romanian novelist, short story writer, journalist, and critic

== See also ==
- Leiva (disambiguation)
- Leyba
