= 2009–10 Liverpool F.C. season =

English football club season

Liverpool
2009–10 season
- Chairmen: Tom Hicks and George Gillett (until 16 April 2010); Martin Broughton (from 16 April 2010)
- Manager: Rafael Benítez
- Stadium: Anfield
- Premier League: 7th
- FA Cup: Third round
- League Cup: Fourth round
- UEFA Champions League: Group stage
- UEFA Europa League: Semi-finals
- Top goalscorer: League: Fernando Torres (18); All: Fernando Torres (22)
- Highest home attendance: 44,375 (v. Chelsea, Premier League, 1 May 2010)
- Lowest home attendance: 31,063 (v. Reading, FA Cup, 13 January 2010)
- Average home league attendance: 41,962
Home colours	Away colours	Third colours

The 2009–10 season was Liverpool's 118th season since their foundation, and their 48th consecutive year in the top flight. They were sponsored for an eighteenth and final season by Carlsberg. Rafael Benítez was the club's manager, this being his sixth and final season in charge.

Having finished second in the previous league campaign, Liverpool qualified automatically for the 2009–10 UEFA Champions League group stage for the first time since the 2002–03 season. This season Liverpool made major moves in the transfer market, selling players such as Xabi Alonso and the ageing Sami Hyypiä, while signing Alberto Aquilani from Roma and Glen Johnson from Portsmouth.

After a season of poor results and inconsistent play, as well as injuries to main striker Fernando Torres, Liverpool finished 7th in the Premier League, their lowest finish in 11 years, and failed to progress beyond round 4 of either domestic cup. They were eliminated from the League Cup at the hands of Arsenal in the Fourth round in a 2–1 defeat at the Emirates Stadium on 26 October. They were then knocked out of the FA Cup on 13 January. After a 1–1 draw with Championship team Reading at the Madejski Stadium in the Third round, Liverpool lost the replay at Anfield 2–1 after extra time.

In addition to a poor domestic campaign, Liverpool failed to qualify for the knockout stage of the UEFA Champions League, finishing third in their group and entering the UEFA Europa League Round of 32; Liverpool were knocked out in the semi-finals by eventual winners Atlético Madrid. They lost the first leg at the Vicente Calderón Stadium 1–0, and despite forcing extra time in the second leg, and then going on to win 2–1, they were eliminated on the away goals rule.

A week after the end of the Premier League season, Liverpool announced they had terminated Rafael Benítez's contract by mutual consent.

== Pre-season ==
Liverpool confirmed that long-serving centre-back Sami Hyypiä would be leaving the club after 10 years to join German club Bayer Leverkusen. Liverpool also confirmed that José Segura, the ex-Olympiacos manager, would be joining the club as Academy technical manager, starting on 1 June.

Liverpool announced their pre-season programme on 6 May 2009, including a tour of Asia and a friendly against Espanyol, as part of a clause of the deal that brought Albert Riera to the club. Liverpool started their pre-season campaign against St. Gallen in Switzerland on 15 July, which ended 0–0, a game in which Rafael Benítez gave playing time to most of his players. Glen Johnson made his debut for Liverpool and earned himself the Fans Man of the Match award from Liverpool F.C. TV. They played their second encounter with Rapid Wien at the Ernst Happel Stadium on 19 July, which Liverpool lost 1–0 from a goal from midfielder Steffen Hofmann. The Asian tour began with a match against Thailand on 22 July, which ended 1–1, with Liverpool's early goal coming from Ryan Babel and the Thai's from substitute Sutee Suksomkit. This was followed by a trip to Kallang to play Singapore, a game which Liverpool won 5–0 with goals from Andriy Voronin, Albert Riera, two by Krisztián Németh and Fernando Torres. They then played Espanyol on 2 August, where they suffered a heavy 3–0 defeat thanks to two goals from Ben Sahar and one from Luis García. They then enjoyed their first win of the campaign, against Lyn Oslo on 5 August, winning won 2–0 with goals from Voronin and David Ngog. They ended the pre-season with a 1–2 loss against Atlético Madrid on 8 August at Anfield. Goals from Sergio Agüero and Diego Forlán put the Spaniards 0–2 up until Lucas pulled one back late on for the Reds.

== Team kit ==
The team kit for the 2009–10 season was produced by Adidas. The home kit remained the same as the previous season. The away kit was black with gold trim. The third kit changed in August 2009 to a new white kit. It was announced that longtime sponsor Carlsberg would be leaving the club after 18 years to be replaced by British bank Standard Chartered, who commenced a four-year £80 million deal with the club in May 2010.

== Technical staff ==
Name	Role
(Spain) Rafael Benítez	Manager
(England) Sammy Lee	Assistant manager
(Argentina) Mauricio Pellegrino	First team coach
(England) Dave McDonough	Head of Technical Analysis
(Scotland) Kenny Dalglish	Academy Development Officer/Club Ambassador
(Spain) José Segura	Academy Technical Manager
(Spain) Paco de Miguel	Fitness Coach
(Spain) Eduardo Parra García	Fitness coach
(Spain) Xavi Valero	Goalkeeping coach
(England) John McMahon	Reserve Team Manager
(Spain) Gonzalo Rodríguez	Reserve Team Fitness coach
(Netherlands) John Achterberg	Reserve Team Goalkeeping Coach

Name	Role
(Spain) Eduardo Macia	Chief scout
(England) Mike McGlynn	Assistant Chief scout
(England) Mark Waller	Club doctor
(England) Rob Price	Senior physiotherapist
(England) Chris Morgan	Physiotherapist
(England) Matt Konopinski	Physiotherapist
(Spain) Iván Ortega	Sports Therapist
(Spain) Félix Fernández Ledesma	Assistant Sports Therapist
(England) Paul Small	Masseur
(England) Graham Carter	Kit Manager

== First-team squad ==
No.	Name	Nationality	Position	Date of birth (age)	Signed From
Goalkeepers
1	Diego Cavalieri	(Brazil)	GK	1 December 1982 (aged 26)	Palmeiras
25	Pepe Reina	(Spain)	GK	31 August 1982 (aged 26)	Villarreal
Defenders
2	Glen Johnson	(England)	RB	23 August 1984 (aged 24)	Portsmouth
5	Daniel Agger	(Denmark)	CB	12 December 1984 (aged 24)	Brøndby
12	Fábio Aurélio	(Brazil)	LB	24 September 1979 (aged 29)	Valencia
16	Sotirios Kyrgiakos	(Greece)	CB	23 July 1979 (aged 29)	AEK Athens
22	Emiliano Insúa	(Argentina)	LB	7 January 1989 (aged 20)	Boca Juniors
23	Jamie Carragher	(England)	CB	28 January 1978 (aged 31)	The Academy
27	Philipp Degen	(Switzerland)	RB	15 February 1983 (aged 26)	Borussia Dortmund
34	Martin Kelly	(England)	RB/CB	27 April 1990 (aged 19)	The Academy
37	Martin Škrtel	(Slovakia)	CB	15 December 1984 (aged 24)	Zenit Saint Petersburg
40	Daniel Ayala	(Spain)	CB	7 November 1990 (aged 18)	Sevilla
Midfielders
4	Alberto Aquilani	(Italy)	CM	7 July 1984 (aged 24)	Roma
8	Steven Gerrard	(England)	CM/AM	30 May 1980 (aged 29)	The Academy
11	Albert Riera	(Spain)	LW	15 April 1982 (aged 27)	Espanyol
15	Yossi Benayoun	(Israel)	RW	5 May 1980 (aged 29)	West Ham United
17	Maxi Rodríguez	(Argentina)	RW/LW	2 January 1981 (aged 28)	Atlético Madrid
19	Ryan Babel	(Netherlands)	LW	19 December 1986 (aged 22)	Ajax
20	Javier Mascherano	(Argentina)	DM	8 June 1984 (aged 25)	West Ham United
21	Lucas	(Brazil)	DM/CM	9 January 1987 (aged 22)	Grêmio
28	Damien Plessis	(France)	DM	5 March 1988 (aged 21)	Lyon
31	Nabil El Zhar	(Morocco)	RW	27 August 1986 (aged 22)	Saint-Étienne
Strikers
9	Fernando Torres	(Spain)	ST	20 March 1984 (aged 25)	Atlético Madrid
18	Dirk Kuyt	(Netherlands)	FW	22 July 1980 (aged 28)	Feyenoord
24	David Ngog	(France)	ST	1 April 1989 (aged 20)	Paris Saint-Germain
39	Nathan Eccleston	(England)	ST	30 December 1990 (aged 18)	The Academy
47	Dani Pacheco	(Spain)	ST	5 January 1991 (aged 18)	The Academy

As of 9 May 2010.

== Squad statistics ==
				Total			UEFA Champions League		Premier League		FA Cup		Football League Cup		UEFA Europa League	
No.	Pos.	Nat.	Name	Sts	App	Gls	App	Gls	App	Gls	App	Gls	App	Gls	App	Gls
1	GK	(Brazil)	Diego Cavalieri	4	4		1				1		2			
2	DF	(England)	Glen Johnson	33	35	3	3		25	3			1		6	
4	MF	(Italy)	Alberto Aquilani	13	26	2	2		18	1	2		1		3	1
5	DF	(Denmark)	Daniel Agger	36	36	1	4		23		1				8	1
8	MF	(England)	Steven Gerrard	47	49	12	5		33	9	2	1	1		8	2
9	ST	(Spain)	Fernando Torres	29	32	22	4		22	18	2				4	4
11	MF	(Spain)	Albert Riera	12	16		1		12				1		2	
12	DF	(Brazil)	Fábio Aurélio	13	23		5		14		1		1		2	
15	MF	(Israel)	Yossi Benayoun	29	45	9	6	2	30	6	2		1		6	1
16	DF	(Greece)	Sotirios Kyrgiakos	18	21	1	1		14	1			2		4	
17	MF	(Argentina)	Maxi Rodríguez (Note: Joined in January)	14	17	1			17	1						
18	ST	(Netherlands)	Dirk Kuyt	51	53	11	6	1	37	9	2		1		7	1
19	MF	(Netherlands)	Ryan Babel	16	38	6	3	1	25	4	1		2		7	1
20	MF	(Argentina)	Javier Mascherano	44	48	1	5		34				1		8	1
21	MF	(Brazil)	Lucas Leiva	46	50	1	5		35		2				8	1
22	DF	(Argentina)	Emiliano Insúa	43	44	1	6		31		2		1	1	4	
23	DF	(England)	Jamie Carragher	53	53		5		37		2		1		8	
24	ST	(France)	David Ngog	18	37	8	3	1	24	5	2		2	1	6	1
25	GK	(Spain)	Pepe Reina	52	52		5		38		1				8	
27	DF	(Switzerland)	Philipp Degen	6	11				7		1		2		1	
28	MF	(France)	Damien Plessis	1	1								1			
31	MF	(Morocco)	Nabil El Zhar	1	7				3						4	
34	DF	(England)	Martin Kelly	1	3		1		1						1	
37	DF	(Slovakia)	Martin Škrtel	23	29	1	4		19	1	2		2		2	
39	ST	(England)	Nathan Eccleston		2				1				1			
40	DF	(Spain)	Daniel Ayala	2	5				5							
47	ST	(Spain)	Dani Pacheco		7		1		4						2	
49	DF	(England)	Jack Robinson		1				1							
Players sold or loaned out after the start of the season:
10	FW	(Ukraine)	Andriy Voronin	3	12		3		8				1			
26	MF	(England)	Jay Spearing	3	5				3				2			
32	DF	(England)	Stephen Darby	2	3		1		1		1					
38	DF	(Italy)	Andrea Dossena	3	5		2		2				1			

== Reserve squad ==
Updated 23 March 2010 Squad Numbers refer to players' first team squad number (for season 2009–10), where applicable. Reserve and youth games are 1–11. See Liverpool F.C. Reserves and Academy

Note: Flags indicate national team as defined under FIFA eligibility rules; some limited exceptions apply. Players may hold more than one non-FIFA nationality.

No.	Pos.	Nation	Player
26	MF	ENG	Jay Spearing
29	FW	HUN	Krisztián Németh
30	GK	FRA	Charles Itandje
32	DF	ENG	Stephen Darby
34	DF	ENG	Martin Kelly
36	DF	ENG	Steve Irwin
38	DF	ENG	Robbie Threlfall
39	FW	ENG	Nathan Eccleston
40	DF	ESP	Daniel Ayala
41	GK	DEN	Martin Hansen
42	GK	HUN	Péter Gulácsi
43	GK	AUS	Dean Bouzanis
44	GK	ENG	David Martin
45	MF	SWE	Alex Kačaniklić
46	MF	ENG	David Amoo

No.	Pos.	Nation	Player
47	FW	ESP	Daniel Pacheco
48	MF	ARG	Gerardo Bruna
49	DF	ENG	Jack Robinson
—	GK	IRL	Christopher Oldfield
—	DF	ESP	Emmanuel Mendy
—	DF	FRA	Chris Mavinga
—	DF	ESP	Mikel San José
—	MF	ESP	Francisco Durán
—	MF	ISL	Guðlaugur Victor Pálsson
—	MF	HUN	Zsolt Pölöskei (on loan from MTK Hungaria)
—	MF	NED	Vincent Weijl
—	FW	NED	Jordy Brouwer
—	FW	FIN	Lauri Dalla Valle
—	FW	DEN	Nikola Sarić
—	FW	HUN	András Simon

== Transfers ==
=== In ===
First Team

No.	Pos.	Nat.	Name	Age	EU	Moving from	Type	Transfer window	Ends	Transfer fee	Source
4	MF	(Italy)	Alberto Aquilani	25	EU	Roma (Italy)	Transfer	Summer	2014	€22,100,000	BBC
2	RB	(England)	Glen Johnson	24	EU	Portsmouth	Transfer	Summer	2013	£17.5M	BBC
16	DF	(Greece)	Sotirios Kyrgiakos	30	EU	AEK Athens (Greece)	Transfer	Summer	2011	£2M + Németh loan	liverpoolfc.com
17	MF	(Argentina)	Maxi Rodríguez	29	EU	Atlético Madrid (Spain)	Transfer	Winter	2013	Free	liverpoolfc.com

Last updated: 13 January

Reserves and Academy

No.	Pos.	Nat.	Name	Age	EU	Moving from	Type	Transfer window	Ends	Transfer fee	Source
	GK	(England)	Tyrell Belford	15	EU	Coventry City	Transfer	Summer	Undisclosed	Compensation	Coventry Telegraph
	MF	(Iceland)	Kristján Emilsson	16	EU	FH	Transfer	Summer	Undisclosed	Undisclosed	Liverpool F.C. Official site
	MF	(England)	Aaron King	16	EU	Rushden & Diamonds	Transfer	Summer	Undisclosed	Undisclosed	Rushden & Diamonds Official website
	MF	(Denmark)	Nicolas Kohlert	16	EU	Esbjerg fB (Denmark)	Transfer	Summer	2012	Undisclosed	Goal.com
	DF	(Republic of Ireland)	Maloney	16	EU	St Josephs Boys AFC	Transfer	Summer	Undisclosed	Undisclosed	
	LB	(France)	Chris Mavinga	18	EU	Paris Saint-Germain (France)	Transfer	Summer	Undisclosed	Undisclosed	Liverpool F.C. Official site
		(England)	David Moli		EU	Luton Town	Transfer	Summer	Undisclosed	Compensation	Luton Town F.C.
	FW	(England)	Michael Ngoo	16	EU	Southend United	Transfer	Summer	Undisclosed	£250,000	Liverpool F.C. Official site
	DF	(Germany)	Stephen Sama	16	EU	Borussia Dortmund (Germany)	Transfer	Summer	2012	Compensation	Liverpool F.C. Official site
	MF	(Portugal)	Toni Silva	16	EU	Benfica (Portugal)	Transfer	Summer	Undisclosed	Compensation	Liverpool F.C.
	DF	(Czech Republic)	Jakub Sokolík	16	EU	Baník Ostrava (Czech Republic)	Transfer	Summer	Undisclosed	Undisclosed	Sky Sports
	GK	(England)	Jamie Stephens	16	EU	Swindon Town	Transfer	Summer	Undisclosed	Undisclosed	Liverpool F.C.

Last updated: 10 December

=== Out ===
First Team

No.	Pos.	Nat.	Name	Age	EU	Moving to	Type	Transfer window	Transfer fee	Source
14	CM	(Spain)	Xabi Alonso	27	EU	Real Madrid	Transfer	Summer	£30,000,000	liverpoolfc.com
17	DF	(Spain)	Álvaro Arbeloa	26	EU	Real Madrid	Transfer	Summer	£3,500,000	liverpoolfc.com
35	MF	(Scotland)	Ryan Flynn	21	EU	Falkirk	Transfer	Summer	Undisclosed	liverpoolfc.com
4	CB	(Finland)	Sami Hyypiä	35	EU	Bayer Leverkusen (Germany)	Contract ended	Summer	Free	liverpoolfc.com
33	LM	(Argentina)	Sebastián Leto	22	Non-EU	Panathinaikos (Greece)	Transfer	Summer	£3,000,000	liverpoolfc.com
38	FW	(England)	Craig Lindfield	20	EU	Macclesfield Town	Released	Summer	Free	liverpoolfc.com
16	RM	(England)	Jermaine Pennant	26	EU	Zaragoza (Spain)	Contract ended	Summer	Free	Guardian
38	DF	(Italy)	Andrea Dossena	28	EU	Napoli	Transfer	Winter	€4,250,000	liverpoolfc.com
10	FW	(Ukraine)	Andriy Voronin	30	Non-EU	Dynamo Moscow	Transfer	Winter	€2,000,000	liverpoolfc.com

Last updated: 10 January

Reserves and Academy

No.	Pos.	Nat.	Name	Age	EU	Moving to	Type	Transfer window	Transfer fee	Source
	RW	(England)	Paul Anderson	20	EU	Nottingham Forest	Transfer	Summer	£250,000	Liverpool Official Site
	DF	(Ghana)	Godwin Antwi	21	EU	Vejle BK (Denmark)	Contract ended	Summer	Free	Liverpool Official Site
	MF	(Sweden)	Astrit Ajdarević	18	EU	Leicester City (England)	Contract ended	Summer	Free	BBC
	DF	(Germany)	Christopher Buchtmann	17	EU	Fulham (England)	Transfer	Winter	£100,000	Liverpool Official Site
	MF	(England)	Ryan Crowther	20	EU		Contract ended	Summer	Free	Liverpool Official Site
	MF	(England)	Adam Dawson	16	EU	Bury	Released	Summer	Free	Bury Times
	GK	(England)	Hakan Duyan	18	EU	Shrewsbury Town	Released	Summer	Free	BBC
	MF	(Brazil)	Vitor Flora	20	EU	Goiás (Brazil)	Transfer	Winter	Undisclosed	Liverpool Official Site
	MF	(England)	Adam Hammill	21	EU	Barnsley	Transfer	Summer	Undisclosed	Liverpool Official Site
	CB	(England)	Jack Hobbs	20	EU	Leicester City	Transfer	Summer	£400,000	Liverpool Official Site
	DF	(Paraguay)	Ronald Huth	19	EU	Vicenza (Italy)	Contract ended	Summer	Free	Liverpool Official Site
	DF	(England)	Joe Kennedy	18	EU		Youth contract ended	Summer	Free	Liverpool Official Site
	MF	(Scotland)	Gary Mackay-Steven	20	EU		Contract ended	Summer	Free	Liverpool Official Site
	DF	(Republic of Ireland)	Shane O'Connor	19	EU	Ipswich Town (England)	Contract ended	Summer	Free	Liverpool Official Site
	MF	(England)	Ray Putterill	20	EU	Halewood Town	Released	Summer	Free	
	DF	(Spain)	Miki Roqué	20	EU	Real Betis	Contract ended	Summer	Free	Liverpool Official Site

Last updated: 5 February

=== Loaned in ===
#	Pos	Player	From	Start	End
	MF	(Hungary) Zsolt Pölöskei	(Hungary) MTK Hungária	01-07-2009	30-06-2010
	FW	(Hungary) Krisztián Adorján	(Hungary) MTK Hungária	01-08-2009	30-06-2010
	FW	(Hungary) Patrik Poór	(Hungary) MTK Hungária	01-08-2009	30-06-2010

=== Loaned out ===
#	Pos	Player	To	Start	End
26	MF	(England) Jay Spearing	(England) Leicester City	23-03-2010	30-05-2010
29	FW	(Hungary) Krisztián Németh	(Greece) AEK Athens	21-08-2009	30-06-2010
30	GK	(France) Charles Itandje	(Greece) Kavala	31-08-2009	30-06-2010
32	DF	(England) Stephen Darby	(England) Swindon Town	12-03-2010	31-05-2010
35	MF	(Scotland) Ryan Flynn	(Scotland) Falkirk	10-07-2009	14-09-2009
38	DF	(England) Robbie Threlfall	(England) Northampton Town	21-08-2009	19-09-2009
38	DF	(England) Robbie Threlfall	(England) Bradford City	22-02-2010	22-03-2010
38	DF	(England) Robbie Threlfall	(England) Bradford City	22-03-2010	30-05-2010
39	MF	(England) Nathan Eccleston	(England) Huddersfield Town	28-01-2010	08-05-2010
42	GK	(Hungary) Péter Gulácsi	(England) Tranmere Rovers	16-04-2010	23-04-2010
42	GK	(Hungary) Péter Gulácsi	(England) Tranmere Rovers	23-04-2010	30-04-2010
42	GK	(Hungary) Péter Gulácsi	(England) Tranmere Rovers	01-05-2010	08-05-2010
43	GK	(Australia) Dean Bouzanis	(England) Accrington Stanley	26-11-2009	02-01-2010
43	GK	(Australia) Dean Bouzanis	(England) Accrington Stanley	03-01-2010	30-01-2010
43	GK	(Australia) Dean Bouzanis	(England) Accrington Stanley	01-02-2010	30-05-2010
44	GK	(England) David Martin	(England) Tranmere Rovers	16-10-2009	16-11-2009
44	GK	(England) David Martin	(England) Leeds United	26-11-2009	28-12-2009
44	GK	(England) David Martin	(England) Leeds United	29-12-2009	30-01-2010
44	GK	(England) David Martin	(England) Leeds United	01-02-2010	10-02-2010
44	GK	(England) David Martin	(England) Derby County	12-03-2010	10-04-2010
45	MF	(Spain) Mikel San José	(Spain) Athletic Bilbao	15-08-2009	30-06-2010
	GK	(Bulgaria) Nikolay Mihaylov	(Netherlands) Twente	01-07-2008	30-06-2010
	FW	(Hungary) András Simon	(Spain) Córdoba	21-08-2009	30-06-2010
	MF	(Netherlands) Vincent Weijl	(Netherlands) Helmond Sport	30-01-2010	30-06-2010

== Match results ==
=== Pre-season ===
Friendlies
Kick Off	Opponents	H / A	Result	Scorers	Referee	Attendance	Report
2009-07-15 20:00	(Switzerland) St. Gallen	A	0–0	–	(Switzerland) Cyril Zimmermann	20,000	MR
2009-07-19 19:15	(Austria) Rapid Wien	A	0–1	–	(Austria) Gerhard Grubelnik	50,000	MR
2009-07-22 20:00	Thailand	A	1–1	Babel 6'		55,000	MR
2009-07-26 20:00	Singapore	A	5–0	Voronin 45', Riera 54', Németh 73', 83', Torres 80'	(Singapore) Abdul Malik Bashir	55,000	MR
2009-08-02 21:00	(Spain) Espanyol	A	0–3	-		40,000	MR
2009-08-05 19:00	(Norway) Lyn Oslo	A	2–0	Voronin 44', Ngog 59'			MR
2009-08-08 15:00	(Spain) Atlético Madrid	H	1–2	Lucas 82'	(England) Phil Dowd	44,102	MR

=== Premier League ===
==== August ====
The fixtures for the 2009–10 Premier League season were announced on 17 June, with Liverpool being handed an away fixture to Tottenham Hotspur. Spurs took the lead a minute before half time when left back Benoît Assou-Ekotto scored from 30 yards, after Tom Huddlestone's free kick had been blocked. Liverpool showed more urgency after half time, and were awarded a penalty on 55 minutes when Glen Johnson's run was ended by keeper Heurelho Gomes' challenge. Steven Gerrard converted the penalty to equalise for Liverpool. However, Tottenham regained the lead on 64 minutes when Cameroonian centre-half Sébastien Bassong headed home a Luka Modrić free kick. Liverpool seemed unable to respond, and fashioned few chances. They had a penalty appeal turned down on 84 minutes when Andriy Voronin seemed to be tripped by Assou-Ekotto in the box, but Spurs hung on for a 2–1 win. Liverpool manager Rafael Benítez later criticised referee Phil Dowd for his failure to award Liverpool a penalty, and was later charged with improper conduct by the FA.

Liverpool's first home match was against Stoke City four days later. Liverpool took the lead after five minutes when Fernando Torres swept home Steven Gerrard's cross. The lead was doubled moments before half time when Glen Johnson acrobatically finished after Dirk Kuyt's header had been blocked off the line. Good work from Gerrard on the right saw Kuyt make it 3–0 five minutes from time, before Frenchman David Ngog headed a fourth in stoppage time.

Liverpool suffered their first home league defeat since a 0–1 loss to Manchester United on 16 December 2007 against Aston Villa the following Monday. The away side took the lead when Lucas inadvertently headed into his own net from an Ashley Young cross on 33 minutes. Villa doubled their lead in first half injury time when Curtis Davies headed home from a corner. Liverpool did manage to pull one back through Fernando Torres, but Gerrard's poorly timed tackle on Nigel Reo-Coker led to a penalty, which Ashley Young converted to consign Liverpool to a 3–1 defeat. Manager Rafael Benítez criticised his senior players for the defeat and demanded a better performance for the next match, away at Bolton Wanderers.

At the Reebok Stadium, Liverpool had to twice come back from behind against Bolton. They took the lead on 33 minutes when poor marking from a corner saw Kevin Davies bundle the ball home from close range. Glen Johnson equalised four minutes before the break when a Liverpool corner was not properly cleared, and he stroked home left-footed from twenty yards. Bolton regained the lead two minutes after the break when Davies headed down Jussi Jääskeläinen's long punt for Tamir Cohen to smash home. The turning point of the game was Sean Davis' sending off on 53 minutes for a second bookable offence. Liverpool equalised just a few minutes later when Fernando Torres finished tidily following good work from Dirk Kuyt. Liverpool continued to press and finally got the winner on 83 minutes, when Torres' knockdown from a Glen Johnson was met by a shot from Gerrard, who had earlier hit the bar. Gerrard later felt he "owed" the performance after poor performances in the defeats to 'Spurs and Villa.

==== September ====
Liverpool's next match came after the international break, where they faced newly promoted Burnley at home. Despite comments made prior to the match by goalkeeper Pepe Reina that the league title was 'not a realistic ambition this season', Liverpool comfortably dispatched the East Lancashire club 4–0 to go up to fourth in the table, thanks to an inspired performance from Yossi Benayoun, who scored a hat-trick. Liverpool manager Rafael Benítez later praised Benayoun's work ethic, and stated that he was an 'example to the rest of the squad' Michael Shields, attended this match as a special guest, his first since Istanbul, just three days after being released from prison.

Liverpool travelled to the Boleyn Ground the following week, a ground that they won 3–0 at the previous season. They looked to be heading for a similar result when Fernando Torres' goal put the visitors 1–0 up after thirteen minutes. However, Jamie Carragher brought young striker Zavon Hines down on the half-hour, and Alessandro Diamanti converted the spot kick, which he appeared to touch twice. However, Dirk Kuyt put Liverpool back in front four minutes before the break, when he got a slight touch on a Steven Gerrard header. West Ham then equalised on half time through Carlton Cole after poor defending from a corner kick. The second half was approached slightly more cautiously by the home side, and substitute Ryan Babel made the desired impact when his ball was headed home by Torres. Liverpool held on for the remaining 15 minutes for their second consecutive 3–2 away win. Benítez praised Torres for his role in the win; Torres had stated earlier that week that he felt he was not playing to standard.

The club's last Premier League match of the month came at home on 26 September, against Hull City. Liverpool took the lead after Fernando Torres slotted past Boaz Myhill. Hull then equalised four minutes later, when defensive frailties were pounced upon by Geovanni. Liverpool retook the lead when Torres rounded Myhill, and the Spaniard completed his hat-trick with a solo effort on 47 minutes. Steven Gerrard made the game safe when his cross accidentally sailed in on the hour. Substitute Ryan Babel then came off the bench to tap in a fifth and he inadvertently deflected Albert Riera's shot in injury time to make it 6–1.

==== October ====
Liverpool lost their first big four game 2–0 to Chelsea at Stamford Bridge. The match was level until Nicolas Anelka guided the ball over Pepe Reina on the hour mark. With Liverpool pouring forward in search of an equaliser, Liverpool were left stretched at the back. With Chelsea attempting to kill time in the corner, Didier Drogba outmuscled Emiliano Insúa and squared back for Florent Malouda to double Chelsea's lead in added time.

Liverpool lost their next match to Sunderland 1–0. The solitary, controversial goal was scored by Darren Bent. Andy Reid picked out Bent in the box and he directed it straight to Reina. However, a beach ball thrown onto the field by a spectator deflected the ball into the net. Liverpool were not able to react to the shock goal, and Sunderland held on for the win.

On 25 October, Liverpool prepared to face off with Manchester United. Manager Rafa Benítez was under pressure following four straight defeats, but he was calm as he spoke to the press. Fábio Aurélio had a chance when his header was saved by Edwin van der Sar. Liverpool sustained their pressure throughout the second half. They finally took the lead on 65 minutes when Fernando Torres outmuscled Rio Ferdinand and fired his shot into the top corner of the net. United finally reacted after the goal, but were not able to fashion any clear cut chances. Antonio Valencia hit the crossbar, but that was the closest the visitors came to an equaliser. Their plight was not helped by Nemanja Vidić's sending off for a second bookable offence on 90 minutes. Javier Mascherano was also sent off for two bookings on 95 minutes, when he tackled van der Sar. David Ngog finally secured the three points for Liverpool when he broke away and slotted past van der Sar to secure victory, Liverpool's third consecutive victory over their rivals.

Liverpool's final match of the month came away to Fulham. Liverpool fell behind after 24 minutes when Bobby Zamora tapped home. Liverpool equalised three minutes before half time, when Fernando Torres finished from 20 yards. After the break, Fulham started to put Liverpool under pressure, and when Torres was taken off on the hour, they lost their main attacking threat. Fulham retook the lead on 73 minutes, when another breakaway resulted in Erik Nevland finishing off a Paul Konchesky cross. Liverpool were left chasing the game at this point, and they lost two men in three minutes; Philipp Degen was sent off for a tackle on Zamora, and Jamie Carragher was later sent off for a professional foul. This was Liverpool's fifth defeat in 11 matches, and it left them 9 points behind Chelsea at the top.

==== November ====
Liverpool's first match of the month was home to Birmingham City. Liverpool took the lead on 13 minutes, when David Ngog finished off after several saves from Joe Hart. Birmingham fought back, however, and equalised on 26 minutes, when a harmless free kick resulted in Christian Benítez heading home. Birmingham took the lead in the third minute of first half stoppage time, when Cameron Jerome netted from 35 yards. Liverpool brought on Steven Gerrard at the break, and he converted Liverpool's equaliser on 71 minutes, from the penalty spot, after Ngog had adjudged to be fouled by Lee Carsley. TV replays showed that Ngog had dived. Liverpool could not find the winner, but this would have been harsh on Birmingham, who had defended well throughout.

Liverpool's next match after the international break was another home game, this time to Manchester City. Liverpool took the lead five minutes into the second half when Martin Škrtel got the vital touch from a Gerrard free kick. City got back into the game on 69 minutes; poor marking from Craig Bellamy's corner left Emmanuel Adebayor with a free header from six yards. City then silenced Anfield when they took the lead on 76 minutes; Shaun Wright-Phillips turned Sotirios Kyrgiakos and crossed for Stephen Ireland to finish from close range. However, City could not hold on to their lead, and Yossi Benayoun was left to tap home just 72 seconds after Ireland's goal.

Liverpool headed into the Merseyside derby having exited the Champions League, and with just one win in 10. Everton were also in poor form, though they started the brighter of the two teams. Liverpool were content to soak up the pressure, and took the lead on 12 minutes, when Javier Mascherano's 30-yard shot was deflected in by Joseph Yobo. Everton's Jo had two goals ruled out for offside, and though Everton had the possession, they could not convert this into goals. Everton were left chasing the game late into the second half, and Yobo's defensive error allowed Gerrard to tee up Albert Riera, whose powerful shot Tim Howard could not hold, allowing Dirk Kuyt to tap in with ten minutes remaining. Liverpool had further chances to add to their goal tally, but 2–0 flattered Liverpool, who had taken their chances, and defended well.

==== December ====
On a high after the derby win, The Reds travelled to Ewood Park as they faced Blackburn Rovers in what was Steven Gerrard's 500th game for Liverpool. Rovers manager Sam Allardyce has a good record against Liverpool, and he managed to contain the Reds in a goalless draw. Chances were few and far between, with the best chance falling to the young Frenchman David Ngog late on; his scuffed shot hit the bar.

Liverpool's next game was at home to Arsenal. The home side started well, dominating Arsenal in the early stages. Their pressure paid off four minutes before the break when Dirk Kuyt tapped home from close range. Cesc Fàbregas later revealed that manager Arsène Wenger had given his players the hairdryer treatment at half time, making it clear in no uncertain terms that they had played awfully in the first period. Arsenal returned invigoured after the second half, and put Liverpool under a period of intense pressure in the opening exchanges of the second half. Arsenal equalised when Samir Nasri's cross was inadvertently deflected into his own net by Glen Johnson. Buoyed by the goal, Arsenal pushed on and took the lead five minutes later through a goal from Andrey Arshavin which gave Reina no chance at his near post. Arsenal held on for their first win at Anfield since October 2003.

Liverpool managed to regain the winning touch with a 2–1 win over Wigan Athletic at Anfield three days later. The away side gave a good account of themselves, and aside from David Ngog's early goal, matched Liverpool for spells. Liverpool wrapped up the win 11 minutes from time with Fernando Torres' 11th goal of the season. Wigan got a late consolation through Charles N'Zogbia, which was more than deserved.

Liverpool travelled to Fratton Park to face bottom of the table Portsmouth in what was seen as an easy game. Liverpool manager Rafa Benítez had made an eyebrow-raising team selection upon his team's visit the previous season, and he also raised questions about his selection as he picked out-of-favour Andrea Dossena on the left. Daniel Agger's close-range header was the visitors' best chance of the half, but it was Portsmouth who took the lead six minutes from the end, Algerian Nadir Belhadj rifling in a shot from what seemed an impossible angle. Javier Mascherano was sent off in first-half injury time after a two-footed lunge on Tal Ben Haim. The away side pressured for an equaliser in the second half, with Asmir Begović pulling off a stupendous save from Steven Gerrard's heavily deflected shot. The home side sealed the win with seven minutes to go when Frédéric Piquionne volleyed home from 10 yards by sealing Portsmouth's first victory over Liverpool since April 2007. Many fans called for Benítez's exit after the game, despite his 'guarantee' of a fourth-place finish.

The boxing day fixture saw Liverpool host Wolves. An even first half saw Kevin Doyle miss the away side's best chance as he headed over from six yards, but Stephen Ward's controversial red card early in the second half proved a turning point. Steven Gerrard powered in a header just after the hour, and Yossi Benayoun added a second deflected shot eight minutes later.

Liverpool's last match of the decade was a crunch match for 4th place with Aston Villa at Villa Park. The game turned out to be rather poor, with both teams cancelling each other out. Villa missed good chances through Gabriel Agbonlahor and John Carew, but with the game heading for a draw, Fernando Torres slotted past Brad Friedel in the third minute of stoppage time to give Liverpool a vital three points.

==== January ====
Liverpool's first Premier League match of the calendar year pitted them against Stoke City at the Britannia Stadium, just days after they had been knocked out of the FA Cup by Championship side Reading at Anfield. The away side were weakened by injuries, but still put in a creditable performance. Lucas appeared to be tripped by Danny Higginbotham in the penalty area on 26 minutes, but referee Lee Mason booked the Brazilian for diving. Stoke were content to sit back and let Liverpool have possession, and the away side lacked a cutting edge that would have killed the game. They did take the lead on 57 minutes, with Greek defender Sotirios Kyrgiakos knocking in after Thomas Sørensen had dropped Fábio Aurélio's free kick. Stoke put Liverpool under heavy pressure in the last quarter of an hour, and made the breakthrough when Robert Huth scrambled home. Dirk Kuyt missed a golden opportunity to win the game in the sixth minute of injury time, but his header hit the post.

Liverpool faced another important showdown with Tottenham at Anfield. Spurs manager Harry Redknapp felt that his side could get a result at Anfield, with Liverpool missing key players and in poor form. Liverpool, however, started strongly, taking the lead in the sixth minute through Dirk Kuyt's 6th-minute strike. Tottenham were off-par, and despite the ruling out of Jermain Defoe's goal, failed to test Reina. The home side earned a penalty in injury-time when substitutes Maxi Rodríguez and David Ngog combined, with the latter being tripped in the box. Kuyt was made to re-take his penalty, but still sent Heurelho Gomes the wrong way to secure Liverpool's third win in four.

Despite their impressive form, Liverpool were disappointing once more, as they failed to break down Wolves at Molineux. Albert Riera's early effort was comfortably saved by Marcus Hahnemann, but the away side failed to create any clear-cut chances, and the best opportunities in a drab game fell to Wolves' Kevin Doyle, whose goalbound shot was cleared by Emiliano Insúa.

Liverpool's next game was at home to Bolton. They failed to impress, but still managed to grind out a 2–0 win, with Dirk Kuyt grabbing his third goal in as many games as he toe-poked in from close range. Emiliano Insúa's long-range strike was deflected into his own net by Kevin Davies for the second. David Ngog should have added a late third, but missed a sitter, hitting the crossbar from five yards out with the goal gaping. Rafael Benítez praised The Reds' defence, as they kept a third consecutive clean sheet, and a fifth in the last six games.

==== February ====
Liverpool prepared to renew rivalries with Everton on 6 February at Anfield. The Toffees were in scintillating form, earning impressive draws at The Emirates and at Stamford Bridge in their nine-game unbeaten run. The game turned out to be more of a physical battle than a football match, with Jamie Carragher's tackle on Steven Pienaar within the first 10 seconds setting the precedent. Sotirios Kyrgiakos was sent off on 34 minutes for a lunge on Marouane Fellaini, but the away side failed to capitalise on his absence, particularly in the air. The best chance of the half fell to Everton's Tim Cahill, but his close range header went just over. Liverpool took the lead 10 minutes into the second half, Dirk Kuyt heading in from close range from Steven Gerrard's corner. The home side then had to defend as Everton pinned them back for periods. Liverpool threatened on the break, but could not find a second. Everton disappointed, and despite the introduction of Yakubu and Victor Anichebe, could not create a clear opening. Liverpool held on to complete a second double over Everton in three seasons.

Liverpool's second game of February was away to title contenders Arsenal at the Emirates Stadium. Liverpool lost the game 1–0 thanks to Abou Diaby's header. Liverpool's penultimate game of February was away to also top 4 challengers Manchester City at Eastlands. The game finished 0–0. Liverpool players Fernando Torres & Yossi Benayoun both made cameo appearances on their return from injuries, but neither could swing the game in Liverpool's fortunes.

Liverpool's third and final game of February was against to Blackburn Rovers at Anfield. Liverpool had captain Steven Gerrard and Fernando Torres on the same scoresheet for only the third time in the Barclays Premier League this season. Steven Gerrard scored after 20 minutes and Fernando Torres netted 2 minutes before half time after Rovers had equalised from the penalty spot after Jamie Carragher's foul in the box.

==== March ====
Liverpool opened March with a 1–0 loss to Wigan Athletic at the DW Stadium. Dirk Kuyt gifted the goal to Wigan, attempting to pass it back to Pepe Reina, but Hugo Rodallega skipped past Javier Mascherano and chipped the ball over the oncoming Reina to ultimately win the game for the Latics ten minutes before half-time. Glen Johnson came on as a substitute for Liverpool on his return from injury. Liverpool's second game of March was at home to near relegated Portsmouth. Portsmouth were in the hunt to do the 'double' over Liverpool after their morale-boosting 2–0 victory back in December. Fernando Torres opened the scoring for Liverpool with his 14th goal of the season after 28 minutes. Ryan Babel doubled Liverpool's advantage on the half-hour mark. Italian Alberto Aquilani scored his first goal in English football to make it 3–0 on 32 minutes. Fernando Torres scored his second of the night and Liverpool's fourth on 77 minutes. Portsmouth grabbed a sole consolation in the last minute thanks to Nadir Belhadj, but Liverpool ran out comfortable winners.

Liverpool's third game of March saw them renew rivalries with old foes Manchester United at Old Trafford. Liverpool took the lead after just five minutes after Dirk Kuyt released captain Steven Gerrard, who fed in Fernando Torres. Torres shot with excellent power which left United goalkeeper Edwin van der Sar with no chance. Controversy flared when Liverpool's Argentinian midfielder Javier Mascherano appeared to have fouled Antonio Valencia in the penalty box. TV replays clearly showed that the foul was outside of the box. Wayne Rooney took the penalty and scored the rebound after Pepe Reina's save. United continued to pour forward in numbers, and finally got the goal their play deserved, when veteran winger Ryan Giggs crossed. The ball missed everyone apart from Ji Sung Park, who scored despite the close attention from the Liverpool right back Glen Johnson. The 2–1 win for United was Sir Alex Ferguson's 100th home Barclays Premier League win.

Liverpool wrapped up March with an impressive 3–0 win over Sunderland at Anfield. Liverpool took the lead with only 6 minutes on the clock. Great work from in-form Spaniard Fernando Torres on the left resulted in him cutting inside two defenders before a high, curling shot flew into the top right-hand corner. Liverpool cruised into a 2–0 lead when a corner broke loose to right back Glen Johnson, who skipped past a Sunderland defender before unleashing a left-foot strike that took a deflection. Sunderland rarely exerted any pressure to force Liverpool into defensive play in the second half, which meant Liverpool could counter-attack without worrying about numbers at the back. During one of these counterattacks, Liverpool scored their third and final goal, with Johnson fooling everyone by releasing the ball through to Fernando Torres. Torres scored into an empty net to give Liverpool three goals and three points.

==== April ====
Liverpool started off their top 4 battle run in with a 1–1 draw against Birmingham City at St Andrew's. Liverpool took the lead just two minutes into the second half, when a corner on the left side on the edge of the 18-yard box fell short to Steven Gerrard, who curled an effort past City goalkeeper Joe Hart. Birmingham equalised near the end of the game to deal Liverpool's top four ambitions another blow. Liverpool's second game of April was a drab home game against Europa League-contending Fulham at Anfield. Liverpool were without striker Fernando Torres for this game because he was in Spain seeing a specialist about his recent knee injury. Mark Schwarzer was Fulham's hero, shutting out Liverpool all day long with a string of superb saves to keep Fulham's Europa League dream alive. Liverpool were now three points off the top four, having played a game more than Tottenham and Manchester City. Liverpool's third game of April was a Monday night fixture to relegation threatened West Ham United at Anfield. Liverpool took three points from this game, but needed to beat Chelsea to keep their hope of a Champions League place alive. Steven Gerrard's back-pass allowed Chelsea to score, and after that, Chelsea pressed home their advantage. The loss for Liverpool meant they failed to qualify for the Champions League. Liverpool ended their campaign with a 0–0 draw at the KC Stadium against Hull City, in which youngster Jack Robinson made his debut for the reds.

==== League table ====
Pos	Team	Pld	W	D	L	GF	GA	GD	Pts	Qualification or relegation
5	Manchester City	38	18	13	7	73	45	+28	67	Qualification for the Europa League play-off round (Note: Since Manchester United won the League Cup and then qualified for the Champions League, their spot in the Europa League was passed down to the 6th-placed team. The 6th-placed Aston Villa was coincidentally also the League Cup runners-up.)
6	Aston Villa	38	17	13	8	52	39	+13	64	Qualification for the Europa League play-off round
7	Liverpool	38	18	9	11	61	35	+26	63	Qualification for the Europa League third qualifying round (Note: Originally Portsmouth qualified for the third qualifying round of the Europa League as the FA Cup runners-up, replacing the winners, Champions League-qualified Chelsea. However, they failed to apply for a UEFA licence. Therefore, Liverpool as the best placed team not qualified for the European competitions took their place.)
8	Everton	38	16	13	9	60	49	+11	61	
9	Birmingham City	38	13	11	14	38	47	−9	50	

Source: Barclays Premier League

==== Results summary ====
Overall								Home						Away					
Pld	W	D	L	GF	GA	GD	Pts	W	D	L	GF	GA	GD	W	D	L	GF	GA	GD
38	18	9	11	61	35	+26	63	13	3	3	43	15	+28	5	6	8	18	20	−2

==== Games against Top Six ====
Overall								Home						Away					
Pld	W	D	L	GF	GA	GD	Pts	W	D	L	GF	GA	GD	W	D	L	GF	GA	GD
12	3	2	7	11	16	−5	11	2	1	3	8	9	−1	1	1	4	3	7	−4

==== Results by round ====
Round	1	2	3	4	5	6	7	8	9	10	11	12	13	14	15	16	17	18	19	20	21	22	23	24	25	26	27	28	29	30	31	32	33	34	35	36	37	38
Ground	A	H	H	A	H	A	H	A	A	H	A	H	H	A	A	H	H	A	H	A	A	H	A	H	H	A	A	H	A	H	A	H	A	H	H	A	H	A
Result	L	W	L	W	W	W	W	L	L	W	L	D	D	W	D	L	W	L	W	W	D	W	D	W	W	L	D	W	L	W	L	W	D	D	W	W	L	D
Position	12	4	10	7	4	3	3	5	8	5	5	7	7	5	7	7	6	8	7	7	7	6	5	5	4	5	6	6	6	5	6	6	6	6	7	7	7	7

Updated to match(es) played on 24 April 2010. Source: Matches
A = Away; H = Home; W = Win; D = Draw; L = Loss

==== Matches ====
16 August 2009 1	Tottenham Hotspur	2–1	Liverpool	London
16:00	Assou-Ekotto 44'; Bassong 59'	MR	Gerrard 56' (pen.)	Stadium: White Hart Lane; Attendance: 35,935; Referee: Phil Dowd

19 August 2009 2	Liverpool	4–0	Stoke City	Liverpool
20:00	Torres 5'; Johnson 45'; Kuyt 78'; Ngog 90+4'	MR		Stadium: Anfield; Attendance: 44,318; Referee: Peter Walton

24 August 2009 3	Liverpool	1–3	Aston Villa	Liverpool
20:00	Torres 72'	MR	Lucas 34' (o.g.); C. Davies 45+2'; A. Young 75'	Stadium: Anfield; Attendance: 43,667; Referee: Martin Atkinson

29 August 2009 4	Bolton Wanderers	2–3	Liverpool	Bolton
15:00	K. Davies 33'; Cohen 47'	MR	Johnson 41'; Torres 56'; Gerrard 83'	Stadium: Reebok Stadium; Attendance: 23,284; Referee: Alan Wiley

12 September 2009 5	Liverpool	4–0	Burnley	Liverpool
15:00	Benayoun 27', 61', 82'; Kuyt 41'	MR		Stadium: Anfield; Attendance: 43,817; Referee: Lee Mason

19 September 2009 6	West Ham United	2–3	Liverpool	London
17:15	Diamanti 29'; C. Cole 45'	MR	Torres 20', 75'; Kuyt 41'	Stadium: Boleyn Ground; Attendance: 34,658; Referee: Andre Marriner

26 September 2009 7	Liverpool	6–1	Hull City	Liverpool
15:00	Torres 11', 28', 47'; Gerrard 61'; Babel 88', 90'	MR	Geovanni 15'	Stadium: Anfield; Attendance: 44,392; Referee: Peter Walton

4 October 2009 8	Chelsea	2–0	Liverpool	London
16:00	Anelka 60'; Malouda 90'	MR		Stadium: Stamford Bridge; Attendance: 41,732; Referee: Martin Atkinson

17 October 2009 9	Sunderland	1–0	Liverpool	Sunderland
15:00	Bent 5'	MR		Stadium: Stadium of Light; Attendance: 47,327; Referee: Mike Jones

25 October 2009 10	Liverpool	2–0	Manchester United	Liverpool
14:00	Torres 65'; Mascherano (yellow card) 72' (yellow-red card) 90+5'; Carragher (yellow card) 87'; Ngog 90+6'	MR	Evra (yellow card) 15'; Berbatov (yellow card) 37'; Vidić (yellow card) 75' (yellow-red card) 90'	Stadium: Anfield; Attendance: 44,188; Referee: Andre Marriner

31 October 2009 11	Fulham	3–1	Liverpool	London
15:00	Zamora 24'; Nevland 73'; Dempsey 87'	MR	Torres 42'	Stadium: Craven Cottage; Attendance: 25,700; Referee: Lee Mason

9 November 2009 12	Liverpool	2–2	Birmingham City	Liverpool
20:00	Ngog 13'; Gerrard 71' (pen.)	MR	Benítez 26'; Jerome 47'	Stadium: Anfield; Attendance: 42,560; Referee: Peter Walton

21 November 2009 13	Liverpool	2–2	Manchester City	Liverpool
12:45	Carragher (yellow card) 17'; Škrtel 50'; Leiva (yellow card) 63'; Benayoun 77'	MR	Adebayor 69'; Ireland 76'	Stadium: Anfield; Attendance: 44,164; Referee: Phil Dowd

29 November 2009 14	Everton	0–2	Liverpool	Liverpool
13:30	Heitinga (yellow card) 84'	MR	Yobo 12' (o.g.); Kuyt 80'	Stadium: Goodison Park; Attendance: 39,652; Referee: Alan Wiley

5 December 2009 15	Blackburn Rovers	0–0	Liverpool	Blackburn
16:00		MR		Stadium: Ewood Park; Attendance: 29,660; Referee: Martin Atkinson

13 December 2009 16	Liverpool	1–2	Arsenal	Liverpool
16:00	Kuyt 41'	MR	Johnson 50' (o.g.); Arshavin 58'	Stadium: Anfield; Attendance: 43,853; Referee: Howard Webb

16 December 2009 17	Liverpool	2–1	Wigan Athletic	Liverpool
16:00	Ngog 9'; Torres 79'	MR	N'Zogbia 90'	Stadium: Anfield; Attendance: 41,116; Referee: Phil Dowd

19 December 2009 18	Portsmouth	2–0	Liverpool	Portsmouth
12:45	Belhadj 33'; Piquionne 82'	MR		Stadium: Fratton Park; Attendance: 20,534; Referee: Lee Mason

26 December 2009 19	Liverpool	2–0	Wolverhampton Wanderers	Liverpool
17:30	Gerrard 62'; Benayoun 70'	MR		Stadium: Anfield; Attendance: 41,936; Referee: Andre Marriner

29 December 2009 20	Aston Villa	0–1	Liverpool	Birmingham
19:45		MR	Torres 90+3'	Stadium: Villa Park; Attendance: 42,788; Referee: Lee Probert

16 January 2010 21	Stoke City	1–1	Liverpool	Stoke-on-Trent
12:45	Huth 90'	MR	Kyrgiakos 57'	Stadium: Britannia Stadium; Attendance: 27,247; Referee: Lee Mason

20 January 2010 22	Liverpool	2–0	Tottenham Hotspur	Liverpool
20:00	Kuyt 6', 90+2' (pen.)	MR		Stadium: Anfield; Attendance: 42,016; Referee: Howard Webb

26 January 2010 23	Wolverhampton Wanderers	0–0	Liverpool	Wolverhampton
19:45		MR		Stadium: Molineux; Attendance: 28,763; Referee: Peter Walton

30 January 2010 24	Liverpool	2–0	Bolton Wanderers	Liverpool
15:00	Kuyt 37'; K. Davies 70' (o.g.)	MR		Stadium: Anfield; Attendance: 43,413; Referee: Steve Bennett

6 February 2010 25	Liverpool	1–0	Everton	Liverpool
12:45	Kuyt (yellow card) 21', (goal) 55'; Carragher (yellow card) 30'; Kyrgiakos (red card) 34'; Gerrard (yellow card) 85'	MR	Pienaar (yellow card) 29' (yellow-red card) 90+6'; Heitinga (yellow card) 56'; Anichebe (yellow card) 85'	Stadium: Anfield; Attendance: 44,216; Referee: Martin Atkinson

10 February 2010 26	Arsenal	1–0	Liverpool	London
19:45	Clichy (yellow card) 40'; Bendtner (yellow card) 64'; Diaby 72'; Fàbregas (yellow card) 90+5'	MR	Rodríguez (yellow card) 41'; Degen (yellow card) 62'	Stadium: Emirates Stadium; Attendance: 60,045; Referee: Howard Webb

21 February 2010 27	Manchester City	0–0	Liverpool	Manchester
15:00	Barry (yellow card) 54'	MR	Mascherano (yellow card) 31'; Gerrard (yellow card) 45+1'; Babel (yellow card) 63'; Benayoun (yellow card) 67'; Kuyt (yellow card) 76'; Torres (yellow card) 90+3'	Stadium: City of Manchester Stadium; Attendance: 47,203; Referee: Peter Walton

28 February 2010 28	Liverpool	2–1	Blackburn Rovers	Liverpool
15:00	Gerrard 20'; Torres 44'	MR	Andrews 40' (pen.)	Stadium: Anfield; Attendance: 42,795; Referee: Alan Wiley

8 March 2010 29	Wigan Athletic	1–0	Liverpool	Wigan
20:00	Rodallega 35'	MR		Stadium: DW Stadium; Attendance: 17,427; Referee: Andre Marriner

15 March 2010 30	Liverpool	4–1	Portsmouth	Liverpool
20:00	Torres 26', 77'; Babel 28'; Aquilani 32'	MR	Belhadj 88'	Stadium: Anfield; Attendance: 40,316; Referee: Stuart Attwell

21 March 2010 31	Manchester United	2–1	Liverpool	Manchester
13:30	Rooney (penalty missed) 11', 12'; Park 60'; Valencia (yellow card) 61'; Vidić (yellow card) 73'	MR	Torres 5', (yellow card) 25'; Mascherano (yellow card) 11'; Carragher (yellow card) 45+2'	Stadium: Old Trafford; Attendance: 75,216; Referee: Howard Webb

28 March 2010 32	Liverpool	3–0	Sunderland	Liverpool
16:00	Torres 3', 60'; Johnson 32'	MR		Stadium: Anfield; Attendance: 43,121; Referee: Phil Dowd

3 April 2010 33	Birmingham City	1–1	Liverpool	Birmingham
15:00	Ridgewell 56'	MR	Gerrard 47'	Stadium: St Andrew's; Attendance: 27,909; Referee: Martin Atkinson

11 April 2010 34	Liverpool	0–0	Fulham	Liverpool
15:00		MR		Stadium: Anfield; Attendance: 42,331; Referee: Andre Marriner

19 April 2010 35	Liverpool	3–0	West Ham United	Liverpool
20:00	Benayoun 19'; Ngog 29'; Green 59' (o.g.)	MR		Stadium: Anfield; Attendance: 37,697; Referee: Peter Walton

24 April 2010 36	Burnley	0–4	Liverpool	Burnley
15:00		MR	Gerrard 54', 59'; Rodríguez 74'; Babel 90'	Stadium: Turf Moor; Attendance: 21,553; Referee: Phil Dowd

2 May 2010 37	Liverpool	0–2	Chelsea	Liverpool
15:00		MR	Drogba 33'; Lampard 54'	Stadium: Anfield; Attendance: 44,375; Referee: Alan Wiley

9 May 2010 38	Hull City	0–0	Liverpool	Kingston-upon-Hull
15:00		MR		Stadium: KC Stadium; Attendance: 25,030; Referee: Andre Marriner

=== UEFA Champions League ===
The draw for the group stage of the UEFA Champions League was made on 27 August 2009 in Monaco. As Liverpool were seeded in Pot 1, this meant that they could not be drawn with teams from the same pot, such as Barcelona, Milan or Bayern Munich. However, they faced the possibility of being drawn in the same group as Real Madrid, Internazionale or Juventus. Liverpool were drawn into Group E with 7-times Ligue 1 champions Lyon, Hungarian champions and Champions League debutants Debrecen and Italian side Fiorentina. Their first match was at home to Debrecen, on 16 September.

Liverpool's managing director Christian Purslow said that the club was "pretty happy" with the draw.

Liverpool's first game was at Anfield, where they faced Debreceni. The Hungarian champions had chances to score in the first half. However, in the last minute of the first half, Fernando Torres' shot was parried by Vukašin Poleksić; however, Dirk Kuyt was on hand to score the opener. In the second half, Liverpool only briefly threatened to score, while the visitors never really had a sustained period of pressure. Rafa Benítez was frustrated by his team's failure to take the many chances they created throughout the match, and was relieved just to get the three points.

Liverpool's next group game was away to Fiorentina. Liverpool were two goals down in the first half after Montenegrin player Stevan Jovetić scored a brace. The Reds raised their game after half time, but ultimately were not able to finish off the chances that they created. Rafa Benítez was irate after the match, vowing that Liverpool will "'never again' be as bad as they were during the first half." Fábio Aurélio, who had played under Benítez for the last nine years, at Valencia and Liverpool, said that he had never seen Benítez so angry as he was at half-time at Stadio Artemio Franchi.

Liverpool suffered a second consecutive defeat, at home to Lyon. Although the home side took the lead after 41 minutes through Yossi Benayoun, they struggled to maintain the lead, and the visitors scored an equaliser on 72 minutes through Maxime Gonalons. César Delgado scored the winner for Lyon from close range in the first minute of injury time.

Liverpool's next group game was away at group leaders Lyon. Although Liverpool were missing several first team players through injury, they managed to create several chances, the best of which was spurned by Andriy Voronin. Liverpool dominated the game without ever really posing a potent threat to the host's goal. Substitute Ryan Babel finally opened the scoring for Liverpool with seven minutes to go, with a "stunning" strike from long range. It looked as if Liverpool were going to hang on to the three points, and keep their hopes alive, but in the 90th minute, Liverpool failed to clear a high ball, and Lisandro López guided the ball past Pepe Reina to inflict Liverpool's worst run in 22 years. This left Liverpool relying on Lyon to defeat Fiorentina at the Stadio Artemio Franchi in their next group game to stay in the competition.

With Rafa Benitez's men needing nothing less than three points to keep their Champions League hopes alive, they got off to the perfect start inside three minutes. Fábio Aurélio swung over a ball from the right, Jamie Carragher headed it back across goal and David Ngog reacted quickest to poke it in from a few yards out. Liverpool did all they could to keep their Champions League hopes alive, but in the end it just wasn't enough. A solitary goal gave the Reds all three points on the night against Debrecen but thanks to Fiorentina's win in Lyon, the 2005 champions were eliminated from the competition at the group stages for the very first time under boss Rafael Benítez. Alberto Aquilani made a cameo appearance with seconds to spare but the game finished 1–0. After the win in Hungary, Liverpool manager Rafael Benítez said, "We did our part and we did our part well. Obviously we cannot control the other game, but this win will give us confidence."

Liverpool ended their failed Champions League campaign in defeat as they were beaten 2–1 by Fiorentina which inflicted Liverpool's second successive home defeat in this European competition and also they had the worst points tally in their European history.

==== Group stage ====
Group E
Team	Pld	W	D	L	GF	GA	GD	Pts
(Italy) Fiorentina	6	5	0	1	14	7	+7	15
(France) Lyon	6	4	1	1	12	3	+9	13
(England) Liverpool	6	2	1	3	5	7	−2	7
(Hungary) Debrecen	6	0	0	6	5	19	−14	0

16 September 2009 1	Liverpool (England)	1–0	(Hungary) Debrecen	Liverpool, England
19:45	Kuyt 45+1'	Report		Stadium: Anfield; Attendance: 41,591; Referee: Pedro Proença (Portugal)

29 September 2009 2	Fiorentina (Italy)	2–0	(England) Liverpool	Florence, Italy
19:45	Jovetić 28', 37'	Report		Stadium: Stadio Artemio Franchi; Attendance: 33,426; Referee: Felix Brych (Germany)

20 October 2009 3	Liverpool (England)	1–2	(France) Lyon	Liverpool, England
19:45	Benayoun 41'	Report	Gonalons 72'; Delgado 90+1'	Stadium: Anfield; Attendance: 41,562; Referee: Alberto Undiano Mallenco (Spain)

4 November 2009 4	Lyon (France)	1–1	(England) Liverpool	Lyon, France
20:45	López 90'	Report	Babel 83'	Stadium: Stade de Gerland; Attendance: 39,180; Referee: Frank De Bleeckere (Belgium)

24 November 2009 5	Debrecen (Hungary)	0–1	(England) Liverpool	Budapest, Hungary
20:45		Report	Ngog 4'	Stadium: Ferenc Puskás Stadium; Attendance: 41,500; Referee: Björn Kuipers (Netherlands)

9 December 2009 6	Liverpool (England)	1–2	(Italy) Fiorentina	Liverpool, England
19:45	Benayoun 43'	Report	Jorgensen 63'; Gilardino 90+2'	Stadium: Anfield; Referee: Damir Skomina (Slovenia)

=== UEFA Europa League ===
Being unable to finish higher than third in the 2009–10 Champions League group stage, Liverpool appeared in the Europa League for the first time since the 2003–04 season. Liverpool were drawn to play Romanian side Unirea Urziceni, playing the first leg at Anfield.

The dates for the two legs were 18 February 2010 for the first leg and 25 February 2010 for the second leg. Liverpool made 3 changes for the first leg, with Fábio Aurélio coming in for Emiliano Insúa, Jamie Carragher being drafted back into the squad to replace Sotirios Kyrgiakos, and Dirk Kuyt being placed on the right-wing, with David Ngog the lone striker.

Liverpool started brightly, with Steven Gerrard having a shot kept out by the Unirea keeper after 60 seconds and Fábio Aurélio placing a free-kick wide after three minutes. Liverpool continued to press throughout the rest of the first half and for all but ten minutes of the second-half.

Unirea were proving to be strong in defence, but in the 81st minute, Liverpool finally scored, substitute Ryan Babel crossing into the path of fellow substitute Daniel Pacheco, who produced a downward header into David Ngog, and he headed into an empty net. This meant Liverpool would take a slender 1–0 lead to Romania. In the second leg, Liverpool cruised through to the last 16, winning the tie 3–1 and winning on aggregate 4–1. The game did not start brightly for Liverpool, conceding on 18 minutes after failing to clear their lines. Liverpool equalised on the half-hour mark, Javier Mascherano with a powerful low shot into the bottom left hand corner. From there on in, Liverpool scored two more goals courtesy of Ryan Babel and Steven Gerrard goals to send Liverpool into the last 16.

Liverpool faced tough opposition for the last 16, being handed two legged ties with Lille. Liverpool did not play well on the night, and it was no surprise that they conceded in the 85th minute after an Eden Hazard free kick was swung deep into the penalty area and went over Jamie Carragher's and Pepe Reina's heads and into the back of the net. In the second leg, Liverpool cruised past Lille, with the home side completely dominating the first-half. Liverpool opened the scoring in only the eighth minute of the game, with Brazilian Lucas being hauled down in the penalty area after an impressive run from just inside the visitors' half. Captain Steven Gerrard calmy slotted home the penalty in the bottom left hand corner. Back in form striker Fernando Torres doubled Liverpool's lead on the night in the 49th minute with a delicate chip over Lille 'keeper Landreau. Liverpool secured their place in the last eight when Fernando Torres scored his second of the night and his fourth in two games.

The draw for the quarter-finals pitted Liverpool against 31-time Portuguese champions Benfica. The first leg was played on 1 April at the Estádio da Luz. The return leg was held on 8 April at Anfield.

Liverpool started off the first leg well enough to score after eight minutes. Steven Gerrard earned a free kick right on the edge of the penalty area and rolled it into the path of Danish international Daniel Agger. Agger produced a cheeky back heel from 9 yards out that slightly deflected of a Benfica defender and into the bottom left hand corner to leave the 'keeper Júlio César stranded. Benfica were now pressing for periods which forced Liverpool into defensive play. On 31 minutes, Fernando Torres was fouled by Luisão on the far byline. Ryan Babel appeared to have put his hand over Luisão's mouth after calling Torres a "diving f****** disgrace." Luisão was originally sent off for his part in the matter, but then it was Babel who was sent off for putting his hand over Luisão's mouth. Both players missed the return leg at Anfield on 8 April. From there on in, Benfica started to really play, with the visitors rarely threatening on the break. Benfica were awarded a penalty when Jamie Carragher accidentally handballed on the far byline and the striker Óscar Cardozo tucked the penalty away in the bottom right hand corner. Benfica were then awarded a second penalty when a Liverpool defender hauled down Cardozo just inside the penalty area. Cardozo was again the penalty taker and scored straight down the middle. Liverpool have a vital away goal going into the second leg back at Anfield next week.

Any doubts that Liverpool were heading out of Europe's top two European competitions in the same season were soon washed away with an outstanding performance at Anfield. Liverpool took the lead after 27 minutes after a corner by Steven Gerrard was headed into the bottom right hand corner by Dirk Kuyt for his 11th goal of the season. Celebrations soon turned to anguish when the linesman ruled out Kuyt's header as he appeared to be in an offside position. The referee rightly gave the goal as you cannot be offside from a corner. Liverpool doubled their lead just 7 minutes later when Steven Gerrard fed in Brazilian Lucas, who smartly rounded Júlio César and finished from seven yards out for his fifth goal in a Liverpool shirt. Liverpool continued to dominate matters in the second half too, with lethal Spaniard Fernando Torres netting 14 minutes into the second half. First leg hero Cardozo netted a comeback goal for Benfica to set up a nail bitting finale. However, Fernando Torres netted his second of the night and his 22nd in all competitions for the reds this season eight minutes from time. The goal came in similar fashion to the one he scored against Sunderland on 28 March. Liverpool were drawn with Atlético Madrid over two legs in the semi-finals. The first leg was at the Vicente Calderón Stadium in Madrid on 22 April and the second leg was at Anfield on 29 April. Coincidentally, Atlético Madrid is both Fernando Torres' and Maxi Rodríguez's old club, thus both cannot play the rest of the competition, with Torres sidelined for the rest of the season with a knee injury and Rodríguez already played for Atlético earlier on in the season in the UEFA Champions League. In the first leg, Atlético finished with a narrow 1–0 lead, and at Anfield in the second leg, Liverpool beat Atletico 2–1 after extra-time. But due to Atlético's away goal at Anfield, they progressed to the final.

==== Round of 32 ====
18 February 2010 Leg 1	Liverpool (England)	1–0	(Romania) Unirea Urziceni	Liverpool
20:05 (GMT)	Ngog 81'	MR		Stadium: Anfield; Attendance: 40,450; Referee: Eric Braamhaar (Netherlands)

25 February 2010 Leg 2	Unirea Urziceni (Romania)	1–3 (1–4 agg.)	(England) Liverpool	Bucharest
18:00 (GMT)	Fernandes 18'	MR	Mascherano 30'; Babel 41'; Gerrard 57'	Stadium: Stadionul Steaua; Attendance: 25,000; Referee: Stefan Johannesson (Sweden)

==== Round of 16 ====
11 March 2010 Leg 1	Lille (France)	1–0	(England) Liverpool	Lille
18:00 (GMT)	Hazard 85'	MR		Stadium: Stadium Nord Lille Métropole; Attendance: 18.000; Referee: Alan Larsen (Denmark)

18 March 2010 Leg 2	Liverpool (England)	3–0 (3–1 agg.)	(France) Lille	Liverpool
20:05 (GMT)	Gerrard 9' (pen.); Torres 49', 90'	MR		Stadium: Anfield; Attendance: 38,139; Referee: Nicola Rizzoli (Italy)

==== Quarter-final ====
1 April 2010 Leg 1	Benfica (Portugal)	2–1	(England) Liverpool	Lisbon
20:05 GMT	Luisão (yellow card) 30'; David Luiz (yellow card) 37'; Cardozo 59' (pen.), 79' (pen.)	MR	Agger 9'; Babel (red card) 31'; Insúa (yellow card) 45'; Reina (yellow card) 74'; Carragher (yellow card) 79'	Stadium: Estádio da Luz; Attendance: 62,629; Referee: Jonas Eriksson (Sweden)

8 April 2010 Leg 2	Liverpool (England)	4–1 (5–3 agg.)	(Portugal) Benfica	Liverpool
20:05 GMT	Kuyt 27'; Lucas 34'; Torres 59', 82'; Benayoun (yellow card) 75'	MR	Cardozo 70'; Aimar (yellow card) 84'	Stadium: Anfield; Attendance: 42,377; Referee: Björn Kuipers (Netherlands)

==== Semi-final ====
22 April 2010 Leg 1	Atlético Madrid (Spain)	1–0	(England) Liverpool	Madrid
20:05 GMT	Forlán 9'	MR		Stadium: Vicente Calderón Stadium; Attendance: 50,000; Referee: Laurent Duhamel (France)

29 April 2010 Leg 2	Liverpool (England)	2–1 (a.e.t.) (2–2a agg.)	(Spain) Atlético Madrid	Liverpool
20:05 GMT	Aquilani 44', Benayoun 95'	MR	Forlán 102'	Stadium: Anfield; Attendance: 42,040; Referee: Terje Hauge (Norway)

=== League Cup ===
The draw for the 3rd round was made on 29 August 2009. Liverpool were drawn away to Leeds United. The League One side raised their game for the occasion, and Elland Road saw a bumper 38,168 crowd. Leeds more than matched Liverpool throughout the first half, and had a Luciano Becchio effort ruled out for offside; however, Liverpool showed their defensive mettle. They scored the game's only goal on 66 minutes, when Javier Mascherano's cross-cum-shot was trapped excellently by David Ngog, who turned and finished expertly past goalkeeper Shane Higgs.

Liverpool received a tricky away fixture to Arsenal for the fourth round. The Reds fielded a weakened side, but still managed to match Arsenal's youngsters. Philipp Degen had an early chance on 14 minutes, which he failed to put away. Arsenal punished this five minutes later. Andriy Voronin failed to clear, and was dispossessed by Mérida, who turned and smacked the ball from 25 yards, which flew past Diego Cavalieri. Liverpool's Emiliano Insúa levelled the scores with an even better strike on 26 minutes. The ball ricocheted off David Ngog, and the ball sat up for the young Argentinean to smash a dipping shot over Łukasz Fabiański. Both teams were evenly matched for the rest of the first half. Five minutes into the second half, Nicklas Bendtner put Arsenal back into the lead, when he guided the ball into the roof of the net from close range. Liverpool failed to rouse themselves to react, and despite the introduction of Alberto Aquilani with 15 minutes to go, the visitors could not find the equaliser, and thus were eliminated from the competition. This was the fifth consecutive year that Liverpool had been knocked out at this stage in the capital, and completed a North London double over the Merseyside clubs, following Tottenham Hotspur's 2–0 victory over Everton the previous night.

22 September 2009 Third round	Leeds United	0–1	Liverpool	Leeds
19:45 BST		Report	Ngog 66'	Stadium: Elland Road; Attendance: 38,168; Referee: Alan Wiley

28 October 2009 Fourth round	Arsenal	2–1	Liverpool	London
	Mérida 19'; Bendtner 50'	Report	Insúa 26'	Stadium: Emirates Stadium; Attendance: 60,004; Referee: Alan Wiley

=== FA Cup ===
Liverpool were given a bye to the third round of the FA Cup, where they were drawn away to Championship strugglers Reading. Liverpool drew the tie at the Madejski Stadium 1–1, with Steven Gerrard saving Liverpool's blushes with an equalising goal. The subsequent replay at Anfield did not go to plan; Liverpool lost 2–1 in extra time.

2 January 2010 Third round	Reading	1–1	Liverpool	Reading
17:15	Church 24'	Report	Gerrard 36'	Stadium: Madejski Stadium; Attendance: 23,656; Referee: Martin Atkinson

13 January 2010 Third Round RP	Liverpool	1 – 2 (a.e.t.)	Reading	Liverpool
20:00	Bertrand 45+1' (o.g.)	Report	Sigurðsson 90+4' (pen.); Long 100'	Stadium: Anfield; Attendance: 31,063; Referee: Phil Dowd
