= Diego Cavalieri =

Brazilian footballer (born 1982)

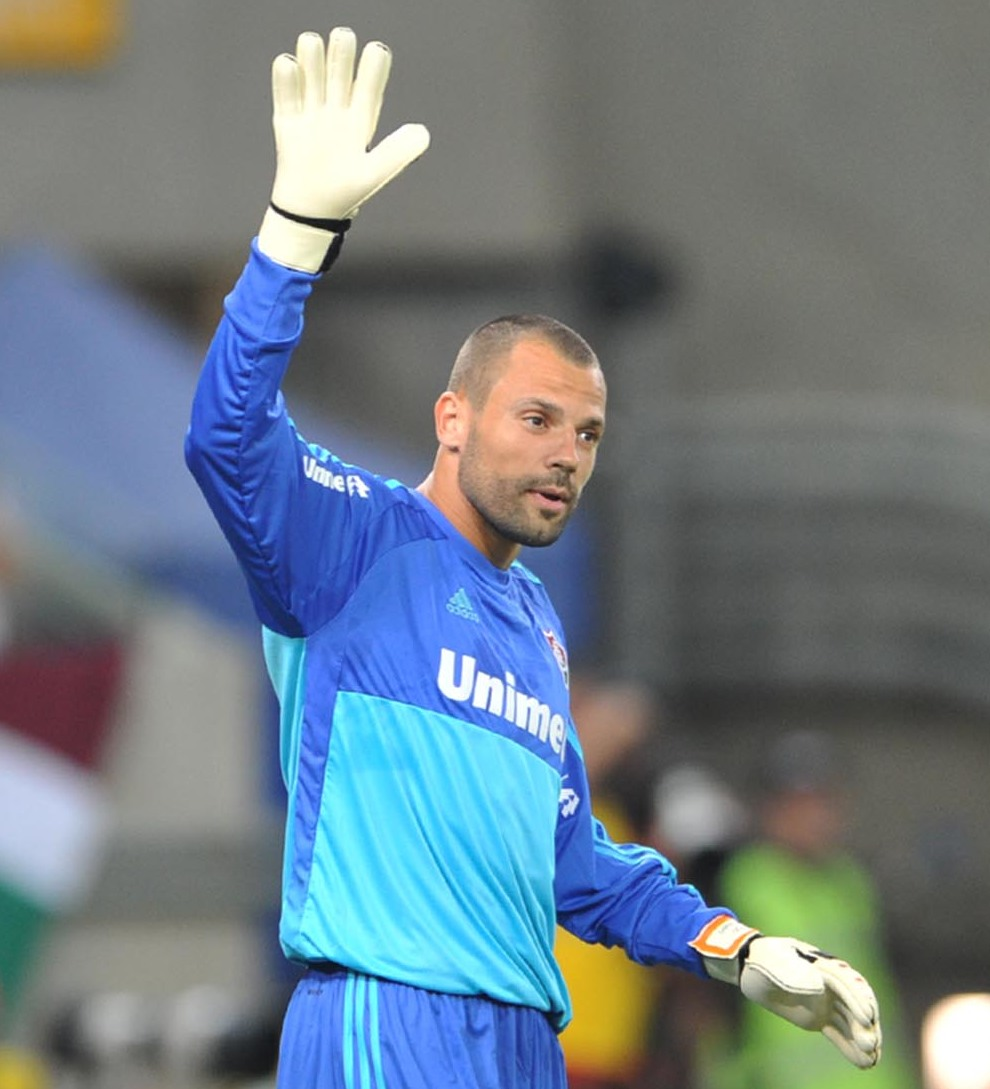
- Cavalieri playing for Fluminense in 2014

Personal information
- Full name: Diego Cavalieri
- Date of birth: 1 December 1982 (age 43)
- Place of birth: São Paulo, Brazil
- Height: 1.89 m (6 ft 2 in)
- Position: Goalkeeper

Youth career
- 2001–2002: Palmeiras

Senior career*
Years	Team	Apps	(Gls)
2002–2008	Palmeiras	65	(0)
2008–2010	Liverpool	0	(0)
2010	Cesena	0	(0)
2010–2017	Fluminense	214	(0)
2018	Crystal Palace	0	(0)
2019–2021	Botafogo	31	(0)
Total		310	(0)

International career
2012–2013	Brazil	3	(0)
Medal record
Men's Football
Representing Brazil
FIFA Confederations Cup
Winner	2013 Brazil
- * Club domestic league appearances and goals

Diego Cavalieri (born 1 December 1982) is a Brazilian former professional footballer who played as a goalkeeper.

Cavalieri is of Italian ancestry and holds both Italian and Brazilian passports. He has earned three caps for the Brazil national team between 2012 and 2013 and was part of the 2013 FIFA Confederations Cup winning team.

== Club career ==
=== Palmeiras ===
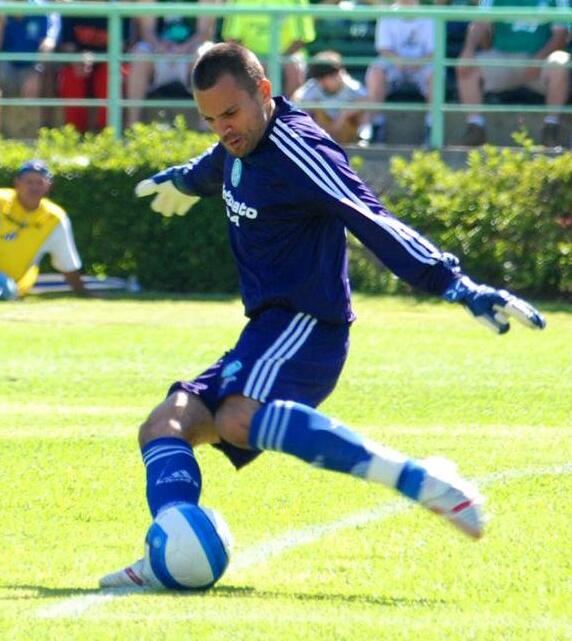
Cavalieri with Palmeiras in 2007

Born in São Paulo, Cavalieri started his career at Palmeiras, where he made his debut on 24 June 2002 in a 4–0 away win over Rio Claro. Cavalieri played 33 times in the Brazilian Championship.

=== Liverpool ===
On 11 July 2008, Cavalieri signed a four-year contract with Liverpool for an undisclosed fee believed to be in the region of £3 million.

Cavalieri became the third Brazilian player at the club, following the signings of Fábio Aurélio and Lucas. Upon his arrival, he was handed the number 1 shirt, last worn by Jerzy Dudek. Cavalieri made his competitive debut on 23 September 2008 against Crewe Alexandra in the third round of the League Cup. He made his UEFA Champions League debut on 9 December against PSV and his FA Cup debut against Preston North End almost a month later. Cavalieri appeared four times during the 2009–10 season, taking his total of appearances to eight for the club, though he never made an appearance in the Premier League. On 29 July, Cavalieri played the full 90 minutes in Liverpool's first leg of their UEFA Europa League third qualifying round tie against Macedonian side Rabotnički. Liverpool won 2–0 thanks to a David Ngog header and a Steven Gerrard penalty.

=== Cesena ===
On 18 August 2010, then Liverpool boss Roy Hodgson confirmed Cavalieri would join Cesena after the Europa League tie against Trabzonspor. Cavalieri had been unable to dislodge Pepe Reina at Anfield since the Brazilian keeper joined Liverpool from Palmeiras in 2008. The deal was confirmed on 23 August 2010, with Brad Jones taking the vacated number 1 shirt. He left Anfield for an undisclosed fee, having played ten games in two years for Liverpool, none in the Premier League. Cavalieri did not feature in a Serie A game during his six-month stint with Cesena, with head coach Massimo Ficcadenti preferring 41-year-old veteran Francesco Antonioli to him. However, he did play a game in the Coppa Italia, with Cesena losing to Novara by 3 goals to 1.

=== Fluminense ===
On 29 December 2010, Cavalieri returned to Brazil, signing with Fluminense. After securing his place in the starting XI during 2011, he was an essential part on Fluminense's title campaign in 2012 First Division, and his displays earned him his debut on national team and the Best Goalkeeper award in that year.

=== Crystal Palace ===
On 2 March 2018, Cavalieri was signed by Premier League club Crystal Palace on a short-term contract. He was released by the club in June on expiry of his contract.

=== Botafogo ===
In December 2018, Cavalieri signed a contract with Botafogo, becoming an immediate reserve for Paraguayan goalkeeper Gatito Fernández. In the 2020–21 season, Cavalieri took over the team's starting line-up after the injury to Gatito, Botafogo's main goalkeeper. At the end of the same season, Cavalieri was injured and lost his starting position to Diego Loureiro. In September 2021, Botafogo announced the termination of Diego Cavalieri's contract.

== International career ==
On 13 November 2012, Cavalieri was called up by Mano Menezes for the Brazil squad that will play Superclásico de las Américas. Playing 90 minutes, Cavalieri, in his debut, won the title.

== Career statistics ==
=== Club ===
As of 2 February 2021

Appearances and goals by club, season and competition
Club	Season	League		National cup		Continental		Other		Total	
Club	Season	Apps	Goals	Apps	Goals	Apps	Goals	Apps	Goals	Apps	Goals
Palmeiras	2002	0	0	0	0	0	0	0	0	0	0
Palmeiras	2003	0	0	0	0	0	0	0	0	0	0
Palmeiras	2004	3	0	0	0	0	0	0	0	3	0
Palmeiras	2005	0	0	0	0	0	0	0	0	0	0
Palmeiras	2006	24	0	0	0	0	0	0	0	24	0
Palmeiras	2007	38	0	0	0	0	0	1	0	39	0
Palmeiras	2008	0	0	0	0	0	0	1	0	1	0
Palmeiras	Total	65	0	0	0	0	0	2	0	67	0
Liverpool	2008–09	0	0	3	0	1	0	0	0	4	0
Liverpool	2009–10	0	0	3	0	1	0	0	0	4	0
Liverpool	2010–11	0	0	0	0	2	0	0	0	2	0
Liverpool	Total	0	0	6	0	4	0	0	0	10	0
Cesena	2010–11	0	0	0	0	0	0	0	0	0	0
Fluminense	2011	34	0	0	0	1	0	4	0	39	0
Fluminense	2012	35	0	0	0	10	0	16	0	61	0
Fluminense	2013	29	0	2	0	10	0	12	0	53	0
Fluminense	2014	32	0	5	0	0	0	17	0	54	0
Fluminense	2015	35	0	4	0	0	0	17	0	56	0
Fluminense	2016	23	0	6	0	0	0	21	0	50	0
Fluminense	2017	16	0	4	0	4	0	11	0	35	0
Fluminense	Total	214	0	21	0	25	0	98	0	358	0
Crystal Palace	2017–18	0	0	0	0	0	0	0	0	0	0
Botafogo	2019	9	0	0	0	0	0	3	0	12	0
Botafogo	2020–21	22	0	2	0	0	0	4	0	28	0
Botafogo	2021	0	0	0	0	0	0	0	0	0	0
Botafogo	Total	31	0	2	0	0	0	7	0	40	0
Career total		310	0	29	0	29	0	107	0	475	0

== Honours ==
Palmeiras

- Campeonato Brasileiro Série B: 2003
- Campeonato Paulista: 2008

Fluminense

- Campeonato Carioca: 2012
- Campeonato Brasileiro Série A: 2012

Brazil

- FIFA U-17 World Cup: 1999
- Superclásico de las Américas: 2012
- FIFA Confederations Cup: 2013

Individual

- Campeonato Brasileiro Série A Team of the Year: 2012
