= Hans G. Hornung =

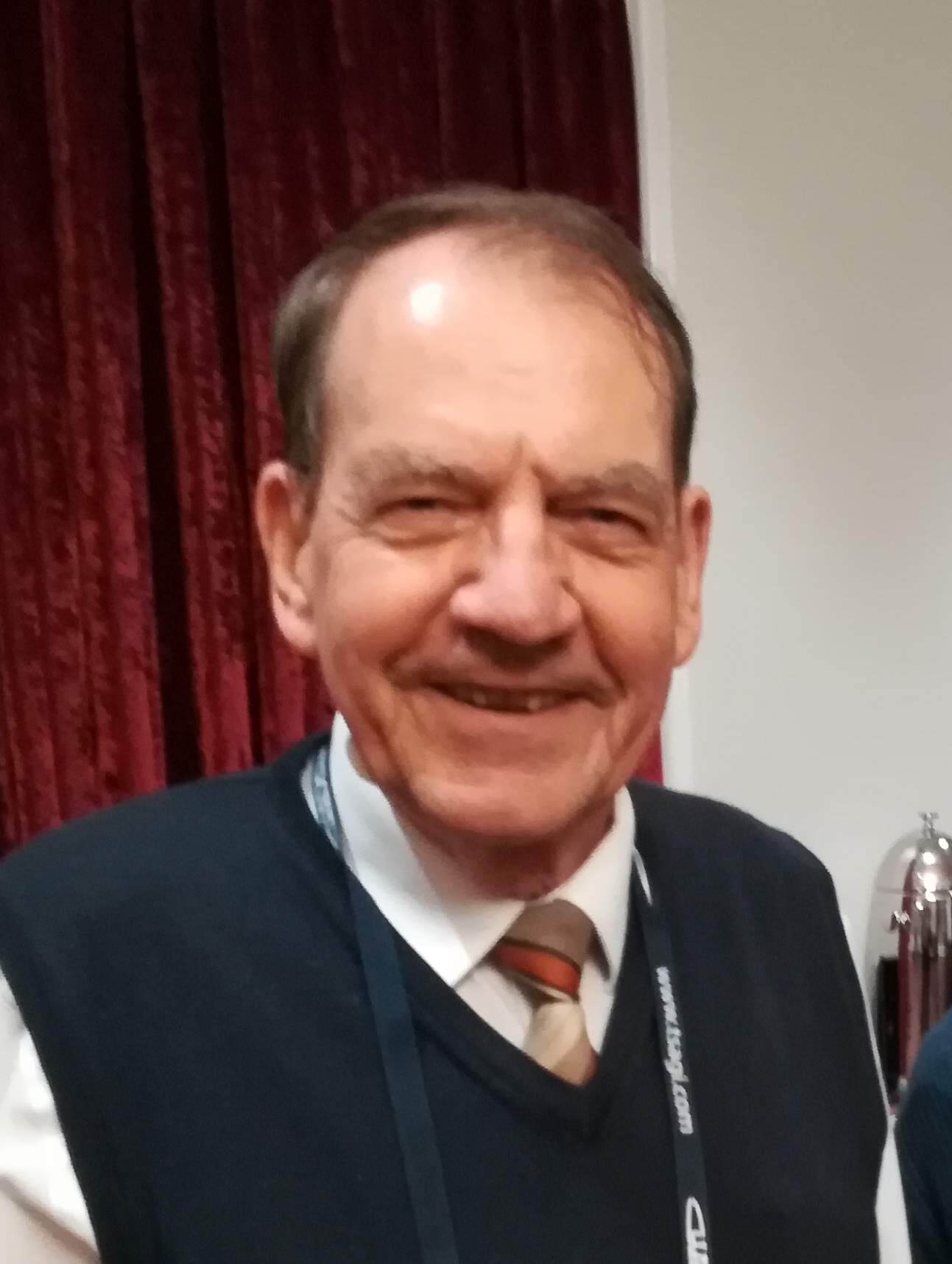
- Born: 1934 (age 91–92); Palestine
- Known for: real gas effects and hypersonic airflow characterization
- Scientific career
- Fields: aeronautics
- Workplaces: Caltech; Deutsches Zentrum für Luft- und Raumfahrt e.V.
- Doctoral advisor: John Stollery, Neil Freeman
- Doctoral students: Ivett Leyva

Hans G. Hornung is an emeritus C. L. "Kelly" Johnson Professor of Aeronautics and former Director of the Guggenheim Aeronautical Laboratory of the California Institute of Technology (GALCIT). He received his bachelor (1960) and master (1962) degrees from the University of Melbourne and his Ph.D. degree (1965) in Aeronautics from Imperial College, London. He worked in the Aeronautical Research Laboratories, Melbourne (1962–63, and 1965–1967), and in the Physics Department of the Australian National University (1967–1980), with a sabbatical year as a Humboldt Fellow in Darmstadt, Germany, 1974. In 1980 he accepted an offer to head the Institute for Experimental Fluid Mechanics of the DLR in Göttingen, Germany. He left Germany in 1987 to serve as the director of GALCIT. During his time at GALCIT he oversaw the construction of three large facilities: the T5 hypervelocity shock tunnel, the John Lucas Adaptive-Wall Wind Tunnel, and a supersonic Ludwieg tube.

He has made contributions in gas dynamics, notably Mach reflection and effects of dissociation, in separated flows, and in wind tunnel technology. He was elected as a foreign member to the Royal Swedish Academy of Engineering Sciences in 1991. In 1997, Hornung was elected a member of the National Academy of Engineering for contributions to hypersonics and aerodynamics.

== Books ==
Hans G. Hornung, Dimensional Analysis: Examples of the Use of Symmetry, Dover Publications (2006)

== Honors ==
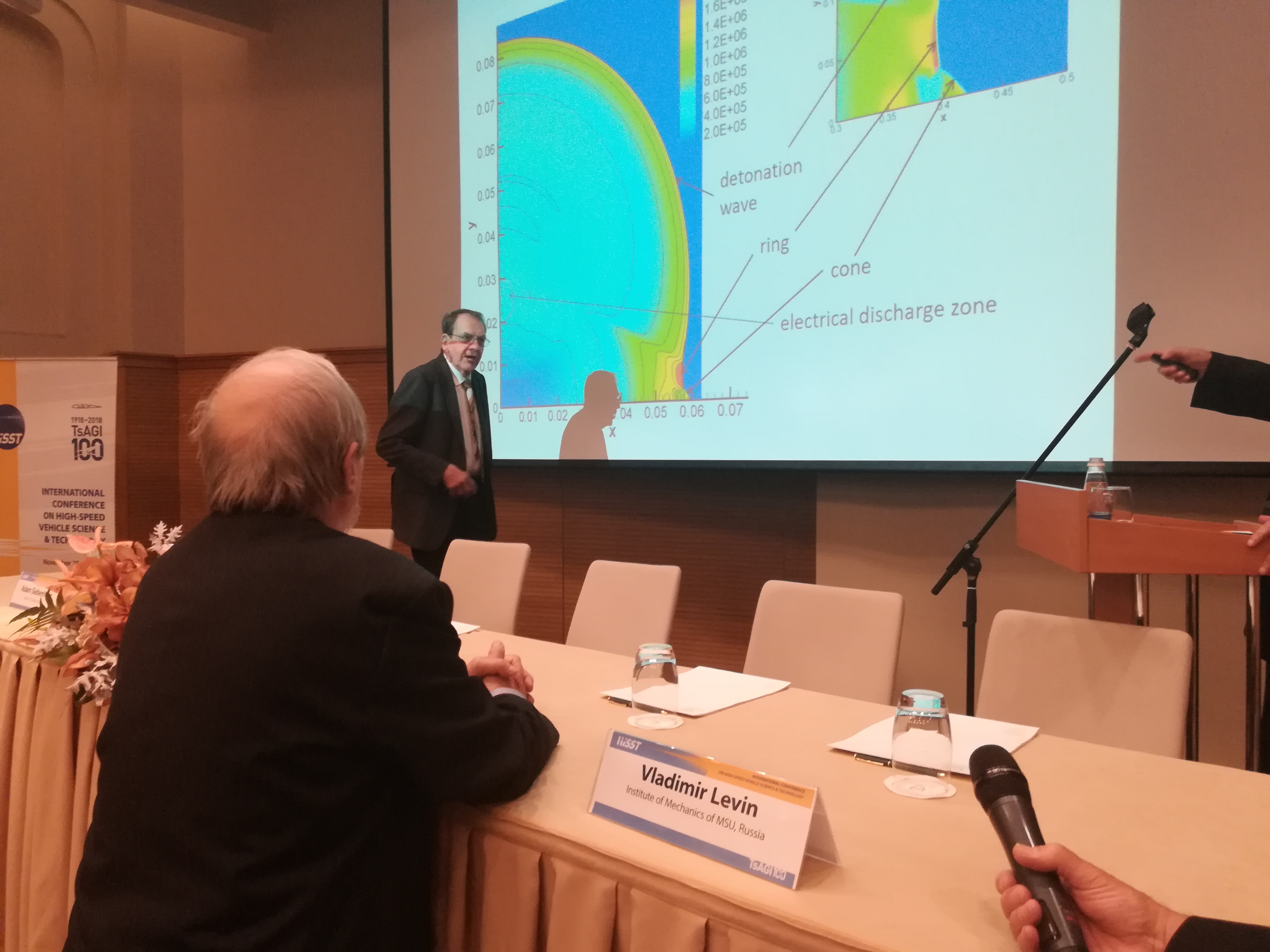
International Conference on High-Speed Vehicle Science and Technology (HiSST), Moscow, Russia, in 2018

- 1988 ICAS von Karman Award, International Cooperation in Aeronautics
- 1991 Foreign Member Royal Swedish Academy of Engineering Science
- 1991 Scientific Member of the Board of the DLR
- 1997 Foreign Associate National Academy of Engineering
- 1999 Ludwig-Prandtl-Ring, German Aerospace Society
- 2011 AIAA Fluid Dynamics Award
- Fellow, AIAA, Royal Aeronautical Society, AAAS, Australasian Fluid Mechanics Society
- 2012 Honorary doctorate, ETH Zurich
- 2015 AIAA Hypersonic Systems and Technologies Award
