= Ivett Leyva =

American aerospace engineer

Ivett A. Leyva is a Mexican-born American aerospace engineer whose research involves the aerodynamics of hypersonic flight and the use of injectors to modify the airflow around hypersonic aircraft. She is College of Engineering Excellence Professor and head of the Department of Aerospace Engineering at Texas A&M University.

== Education and career ==
Leyva is originally from Mexico, where she was raised by a single parent and educated in specialized technical schools. She describes her inspiration for going into aerospace engineering as stemming from "wanting to go really fast". She became a student at the California Institute of Technology (Caltech), where she earned a bachelor's degree in engineering and applied science in 1994, a master's degree in aeronautics in 1995, and a Ph.D. in aeronautics in 1999, under the supervision of Hans G. Hornung.

She worked for General Electric on microturbines and pulse detonation engines. After stints as a thermal engineer at Exponent and as a rocket scientist at Microcosm, a Southern California defense contractor, she moved to the Air Force Research Lab (AFRL), where she "transformed a boutique hypersonics basic research program into one of the largest basic research programs for hypersonic aerodynamics in the U.S." Next, she worked in the Office of the Deputy Assistant Secretary of the Air Force for Science, Technology and Engineering, and returned to academia in 2021 as chair of aerospace engineering at Texas A&M University.

== Recognition ==
Leyva was named as a Fellow of AFRL in 2019, and as a Fellow of the American Institute of Aeronautics and Astronautics in 2021. She was a 2019 and 2020 recipient of the Air Force Meritorious Civilian Service Award.
