= Francisco Leiva =

Spanish dramatist

Francisco Leiva Ramírez de Arellano (Málaga, 1630 – 1676) was a dramatist of the Spanish Golden Age.

== List of works ==
- Cueva y castillo de amor
- La infeliz aurora y fineza acreditada
