= Mario René Díaz Leyva =

Cuban photographer (born 1951)

Mario René Díaz Leyva (born April 13, 1951 in Holguín, Cuba) is a Cuban photographer. With no academic education he is considered a self-taught artist.

== Individual exhibitions ==
Leyva has had many exhibitions, among them Wifredo Lam. Retratos at Ministerio de Cultura, Havana, Cuba, 1980. In 1984, he presented Tres Fotógrafos Cubanos at Capilla del Hotel Presidente, Oaxaca, Mexico. In 1988, he presented Mario Díaz: Fotografías at Centro Cultural San Martín, Buenos Aires, Argentina and in 1992 Direct from Cuba at the Raleigh Studios, Hollywood, California, USA.

== Collective exhibitions ==
He participated in Interpress Foto’79 at the Pabellón Cuba, Havana, 1979 and in Soirée Latinoamericaine. Rencontres Internationales de Photographie in Arles, France. In 1984, he exhibited his works at the I Bienal de La Habana, Museo Nacional de Bellas Artes, Havana. He was also included in Las Americas: Towards a New Perspective at Gallery 1199, New York/Longwood Gallery, Bronx, New York, U.S.A. in 1987. In 1994, his works were part of 45 Años de Fotografía Cubana at the Galería Latinoamericana, Casa de las Américas, Havana, Cuba. In 2002, he presented some of his works at Cuba 1960–2000. Sogno e realitá at the Italian Foundation for Photography, Turín Italy.

== Awards ==
Leyva has been awarded with several distinctions during his life, including a mention in the First Bienal de La Habana, Museo Nacional de Bellas Artes, Havana, Cuba, 1984.

== Collections ==
His works can be found in the permanent collections of:

- Casa de las Américas, Havana, Cuba,
- Casa de la Cultura, Oaxaca, Mexico,
- Center for Cuban Studies, New York, U.S.A.,
- Fototeca de Cuba, Havana, Cuba
- Museo Nacional de Bellas Artes de La Habana, Cuba.
