= José María Sánchez (Chilean footballer) =

Chilean footballer (born 1985)

Personal information
- Full name: Jose Maria Sanchez Leiva
- Date of birth: July 12, 1985 (age 41)
- Place of birth: La Pintana, Chile
- Position: Midfielder

Youth career
- Palestino

Senior career*
Years	Team	Apps	(Gls)
2004–2005	Starflower F.C.		
2005–2006	Juventud Puente Alto		
2006–2007	San Marcos		
2007–2008	Pudahuel Barrancas		
2008	Deportes Santa Cruz		
2009–2011	Shirin Faraz	5	(0)
2012	Deportes Linares		
- * Club domestic league appearances and goals

José María Sánchez Leiva (born July 12, 1985) is a Chilean former professional footballer who played as a midfielder.

== Career ==
From 2009 to 2011 Sánchez played for Iranian club Shirin Faraz.

In 2012, he played for Deportes Linares in the Chilean Tercera A.

== Career statistics ==
Club performance			League		Cup		Continental		Total	
Season	Club	League	Apps	Goals	Apps	Goals	Apps	Goals	Apps	Goals
Iran			League		Hazfi Cup		Asia		Total	
2009–10	Shirin Faraz	Persian Gulf Cup	5	0			-	-		
Total	Iran		5	0			0	0		
Career total			5	0			0	0		
