= Eduardo Macià =

Spanish footballer (born 1974)

Eduardo Macià Martínez (born 7 May 1974) is the head of recruitment for Girondins de Bordeaux

As a scout he has previously worked for Valencia CF, Liverpool F.C., in liaison with manager Rafael Benítez and Leicester City. On 28 April 2011 Olympiacos F.C. announced that Eduardo Macià has been appointed as their new Technical Director. On 17 November 2011, he became a Technical Director of ACF Fiorentina. He signed with Real Betis in April 2015. After he achieved the season's goals, he made a deal with the new president to leave the club, in opposition to most of the board and fans.

In September 2016, he signed a contract with Leicester City F.C. as the Head of Senior Player Recruitment.

== Valencia CF ==
Macià spent two decades at Valencia CF as technical advisor, and as the personal assistant to the club's president, Juan Soler. He had previously worked with Rafael Benítez at Valencia CF, working with the younger players. When he was Sporting Director at Valencia CF, Macià had a big part in bringing Brazilian midfielder Edu on a Bosman ruling transfer.

After losing his role as sporting director to Amedeo Carboni, Macià was offered another role on the club's board but he opted to seek a new challenge. "It's a professional decision," he said. "I think my job here has come to an end and I cannot give more than I have given." Benitez considered making a move for Macià when the latter rejected a new contract offer from Valencia. Former Valencia coach Claudio Ranieri was also interested in tempting Macià to join him, but Liverpool seemed a more interesting option for Macià.

During this period, the squad market value grew from €45,000,000 to €180,000,000.

== Liverpool F.C. ==
Macià's appointment as Chief Scout was announced on 15 June 2006.

One of Macià's earliest contribution was the discovery of Lazaros Christodoulopoulos, who was offered a trial by Liverpool. Lazaros was discovered while playing for PAOK. Lazaros did not travel with the Salonika squad pre-season tour of France, but instead went to Melwood to attend the Liverpool trial.

Macià then worked in partnership with academy manager Frank McParland, who became joint-scout. In 2010, after Roy Hodgson's appointment as manager, rumours stated that Macià had significant control over Liverpool's transfers, which he denied. Macià left his role at Liverpool on 30 December 2010 by mutual agreement.

Players like Fernando Torres, Mascherano, Kuyt or Sterling were among others signed by Eduardo Macià.

== Olympiacos F.C. ==
Olympiacos F.C. board and Macià first met in August 2010, through transfer negotiations between Olympiacos F.C. and former Macià's club Liverpool F.C. After his spell at Liverpool ended by mutual agreement in December 2010, Olympiacos F.C. approached Macià and after a long 4 months negotiations about his role in the club, they finally came to an agreement. On 28 April 2011 Macià became the Technical Director of Olympiacos F.C.

== ACF Fiorentina ==
On 17 November 2011 he became a talent scout of Fiorentina alongside Pantaleo Corvino. On 26 May 2012 Macià was promoted to Technical Director of Fiorentina, alongside new Sporting Director Daniele Prade.

In his first season in Fiorentina, almost 20 players were signed by Eduardo to build a new squad. Cuadrado, Gonzalo Rodriguez, Stefan Savić, Giuseppe Rossi or Alberto Aquilani were ones of the players who arrived to the club. The team finished in 4th place, qualifying for the UEFA Europa League. In his second season in the club, he reached the goals again, qualifying for the UEFA Europa League after finishing again in 4th place and having signed players like Joaquin, Josip Iličić and Mario Gómez.

Eduardo left Fiorentina in April 2015, when the team was positioned in 6th position, just before to play semifinals of the UEFA Europa League against Sevilla FC.

== Real Betis Balompié ==
Eduardo Macià signed for Betis on April, 8th 2015, when the teams was in 2nd Division. After the team promoted to the first division, with a difficult economic situation, Eduardo built a team signing talented players as Pezzela, Petros or the Betis legend Joaquin among others.

After he achieved the season's goals, he made a deal with the new president to leave the club, in opposition to most of the board and fans.

== Leicester City ==
In September 2016, he signed a contract with Leicester City F.C. as the Head of Senior Player Recruitment.
