= Fototeca de Cuba =

Cuban national photography archive

Photograph Michael Dweck standing in front of the Fototeca de Cuba in Havan

Fototeca de Cuba is Cuba's national archive dedicated to photography and visual culture in the country. It was created in 1986 as a division of the Cuban State Cultural Heritage Fund and is located in Havana.

Fototeca de Cuba is one of the largest and most important photography archives in the Caribbean region. Its collection includes more than 700,000 photographs reflecting the history and culture of Cuba over the past two centuries. It contains photographs taken by legendary Cuban photographers, as well as photo archives of renowned collectors and photographers from around the world. Fototeca de Cuba also organizes exhibitions, lectures, and photography workshops to spread the culture of art to the general public.
