= Lucas Leiva =

Brazilian footballer (born 1987)

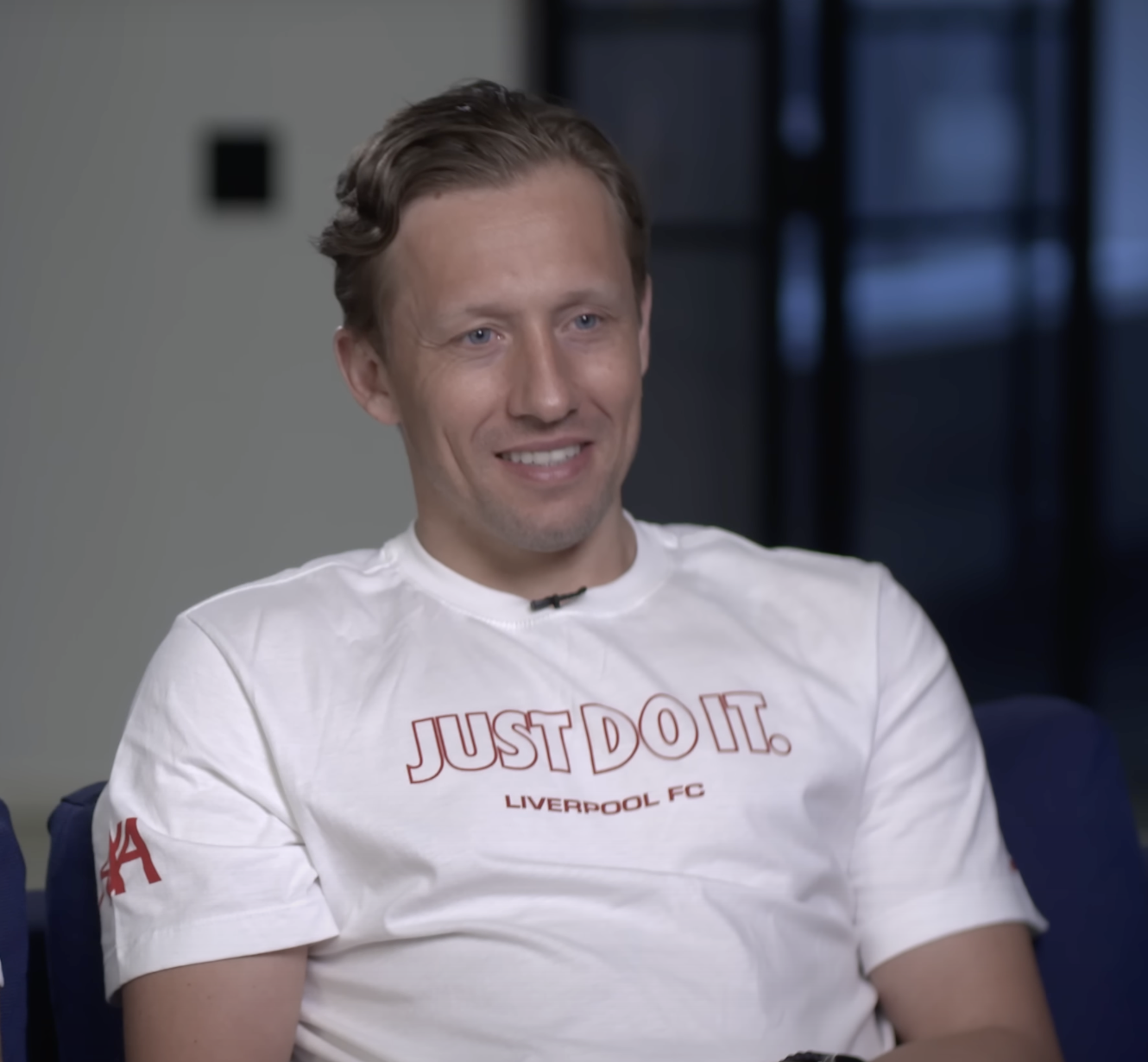
- Lucas in 2024

Personal information
- Full name: Lucas Pezzini Leiva
- Date of birth: 9 January 1987 (age 39)
- Place of birth: Dourados, Brazil
- Height: 1.79 m (5 ft 10 in)
- Position: Defensive midfielder

Youth career
- 2001–2003: Amparo
- 2004–2005: Grêmio

Senior career*
Years	Team	Apps	(Gls)
2005–2007	Grêmio	66	(9)
2007–2017	Liverpool	247	(1)
2017–2022	Lazio	155	(2)
2022–2023	Grêmio	18	(3)
Total		486	(15)

International career
2007	Brazil U20	9	(4)
2008	Brazil U23	7	(0)
2007–2013	Brazil	24	(0)
Medal record
Men's football
Representing Brazil
Olympic Games
Bronze medal – third place	2008 Beijing	Team
- * Club domestic league appearances and goals

Lucas Pezzini Leiva (born 9 January 1987), known as Lucas or Lucas Leiva (Brazilian Portuguese: [ˈlukɐz ˈlejvɐ]), is a Brazilian former professional footballer who played as a defensive midfielder for Grêmio, Liverpool, Lazio and the Brazil national team.

Lucas began his career as a box-to-box midfielder at Grêmio, where he won the Campeonato Gaúcho in 2006 and 2007. In July 2007 he moved to Liverpool, where he made 346 appearances over the course of a decade, winning the League Cup in 2012. Between 2010 and 2016, Lucas led the Premier League in tackles per game five times in six seasons. He has the second most tackles in Premier League history, and has made into the top 10 for most Premier League appearances by Brazilians. He joined Lazio in 2017, winning a Coppa Italia title before briefly returning to Grêmio in 2022.

A Brazilian international from 2007 to 2013, he has earned 24 caps and represented Brazil at the 2008 Olympics and the 2011 Copa América, winning a bronze medal at the former. He also captained the under-20 team to victory in the 2007 South American Youth Championship.

== Club career ==
=== Grêmio ===
Born in Dourados, Mato Grosso do Sul, Lucas began his career at Grêmio as a midfielder in 2005. The following year was a successful year for him, as Grêmio won the Rio Grande do Sul state championship (the Campeonato Gaúcho) for the first time since 2001, and also came third in the Campeonato Brasileiro Série A. Lucas also became the youngest player ever to receive Placar magazine's Bola de Ouro (Golden Ball), given to the best player in the Campeonato Brasileiro – an honour previously won by the likes of Zico, Falcão, Careca, Alex, Romário, Robinho, Kaká and Carlos Tevez.

His form in 2006 led to reported interest from many major European clubs including Milan, Palermo, Manchester United, Inter Milan, Juventus, Atlético Madrid and Barcelona. It was Liverpool that proved most attractive to the player, however, and on 13 May 2007, the club confirmed they had signed the player from Grêmio before the start of the 2007–08 season. The transfer fee was in the region of £6 million.

=== Liverpool ===
==== 2007–2009 ====
On 26 July 2007, he was officially unveiled as a Liverpool player for a fee of £5 million and was given international clearance to compete in the final of the Barclays Asia Trophy.

By late November 2007, manager Rafael Benítez gave Lucas his chance to start a match in the Liverpool midfield after easing him in during his first few months at the club. Lucas scored his first goal for Liverpool on 26 January 2008 when he curled a 25-yard shot into the top corner in a 5–2 win against Havant & Waterlooville in the FA Cup, becoming the first-ever Brazilian to score for Liverpool.

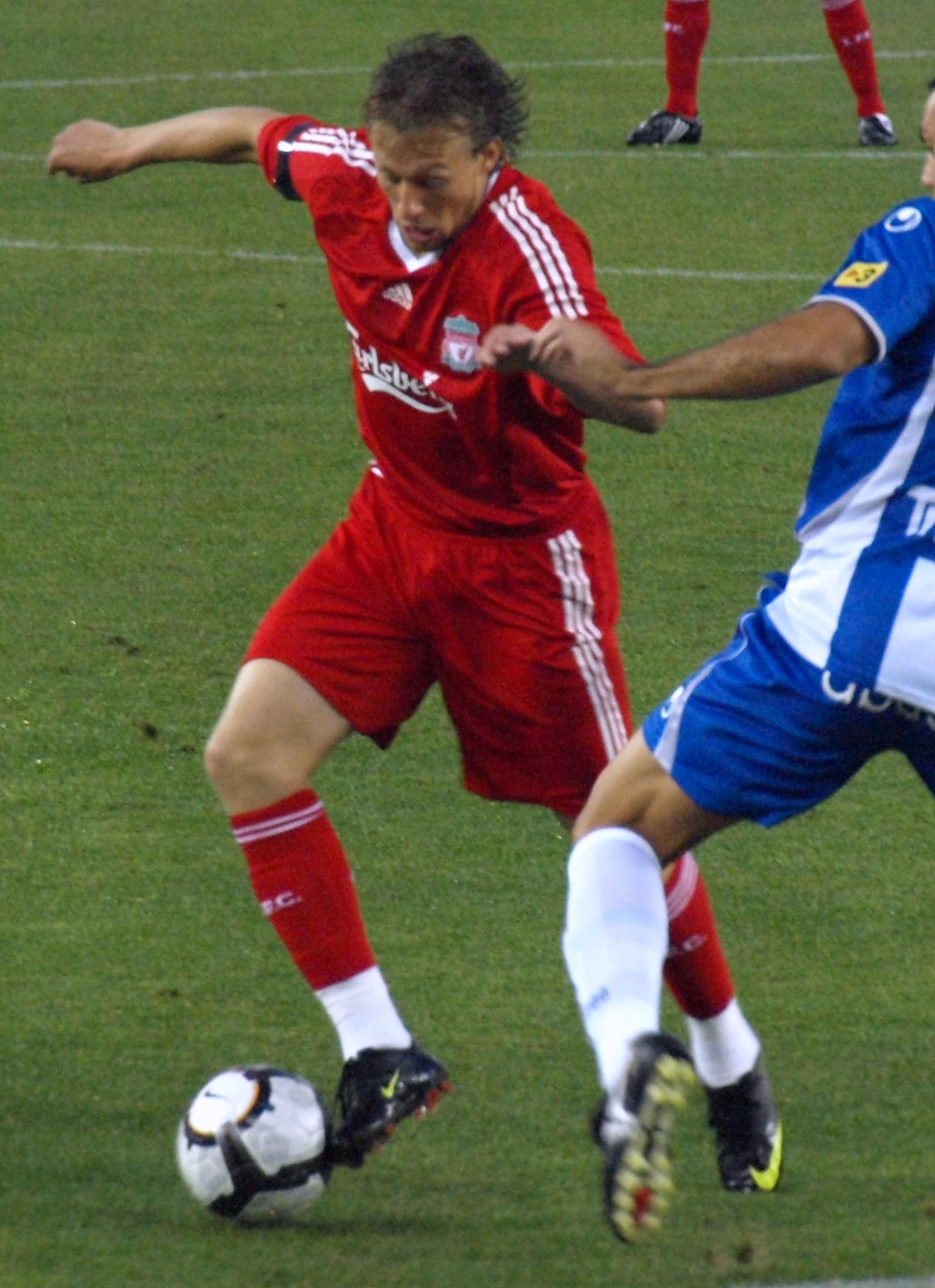
Lucas playing for Liverpool in 2009

The start of the 2008–09 season signified an important turning point for his career. Many commentators expected him to step up to the next level after completing his first season with the Reds. The Brazilian got off to a good start with a well taken opening goal in a 2–1 friendly win over Swiss side Lucerne in July. He impressed in pre-season games but missed the start of Premier League season due to his selection for Brazil in the Olympics.

Lucas returned with a bronze medal and Benítez had high hopes for the Brazilian's future, stating, "This season he will improve because he is a very, very good professional and has experience of the Olympic Games." Lucas noted that Liverpool's squad was much improved from the previous season and relished the opportunity to compete for trophies, despite the increased difficulty of getting a first-team place. However, after a number of disappointing performances, both critics and fans voiced concerns about Lucas' quality and his confidence was further knocked when Liverpool fans booed him after a lacklustre 0–0 draw against Fulham. The criticism irked Benítez and he responded with a passionate defence of the player, saying that "people just don't know how good Lucas is." Benítez also underlined Lucas' credentials, stating that he had been captain for both Grêmio and his national youth team, and that completing for place against Steven Gerrard, Xabi Alonso and Javier Mascherano was inherently difficult. Lucas' performances in December 2008 for Liverpool drew him much praise from pundits, the highlight being his performance in the 5–1 thrashing of Newcastle United, where he provided an assist for Steven Gerrard. Lucas was sent-off in a FA Cup fourth round match against Merseyside rivals Everton, which Liverpool lost. This compounded his growing unpopularity amongst Liverpool's supporters, after he gave away a late penalty in Liverpool's previous match, a 1–1 draw with Wigan Athletic.

On 14 March 2009, Lucas played a key role in Liverpool's 4–1 victory over Manchester United at Old Trafford, starting in place of Xabi Alonso. On 14 April, Lucas played against Chelsea in the Champions League, in place of Steven Gerrard. He scored a goal with his long-range effort in the 81st minute deflected off Michael Essien and past goalkeeper Petr Čech to make the score 3–3. Dirk Kuyt's header a minute later briefly gave Liverpool the lead, but Frank Lampard's 89th-minute strike leveled the score to 4–4, with Chelsea winning 7–5 on aggregate to go through to the semi-finals of the tournament.

On 3 May 2009, Lucas scored his first Premier League goal, a header from a free-kick in 3–0 win against Newcastle United.

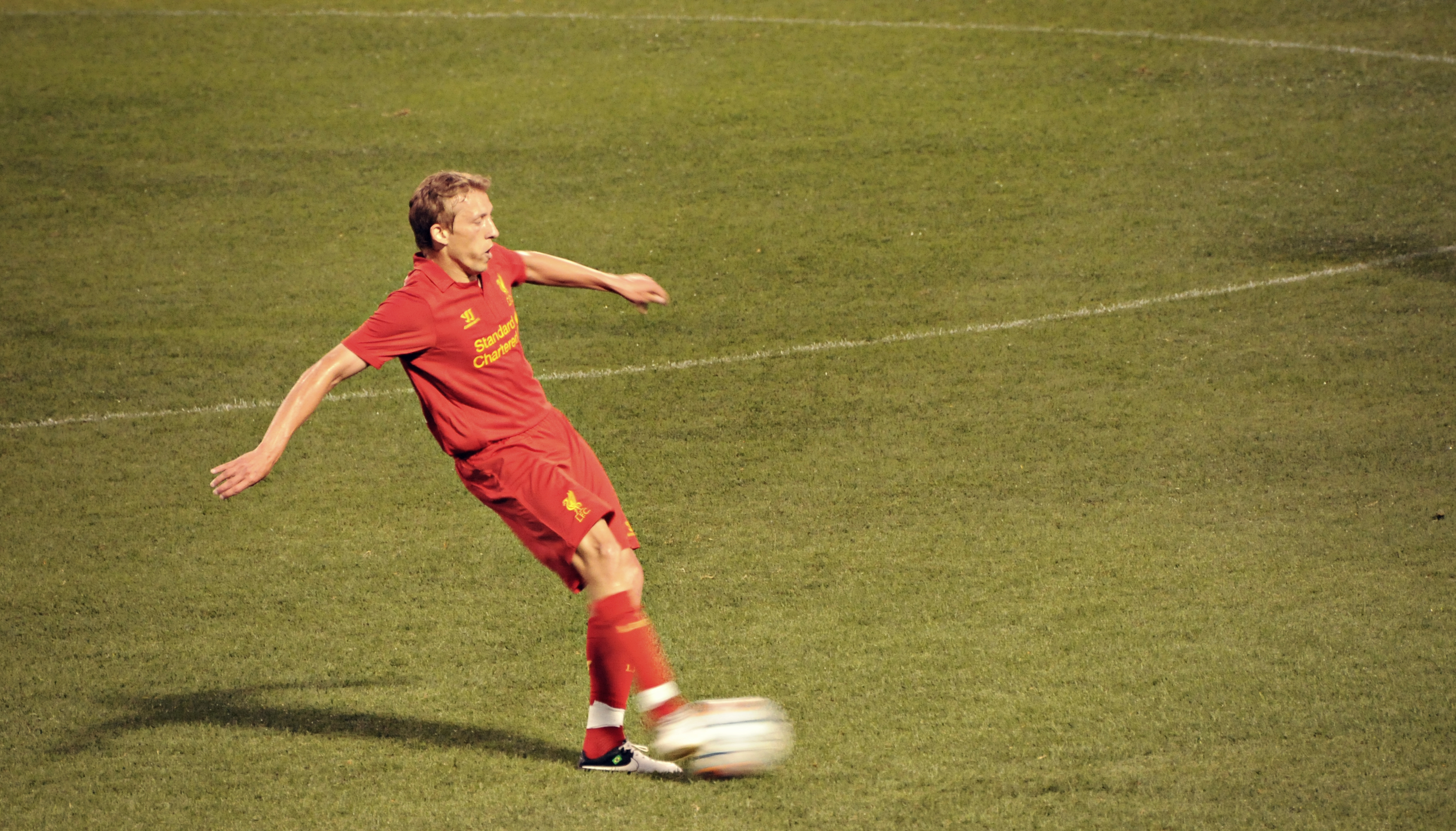
Lucas playing for Liverpool in 2012

During the 2009–10 pre-season period, Lucas showed good form scoring Liverpool's only goal in a 2–1 loss against Atlético Madrid. This form earned praise from manager Rafael Benítez, and gained him a start against Tottenham Hotspur for the opening game of the 2009–10 season on 16 August. Liverpool lost 2–1, but Lucas earned praise for a solid performance all round.

==== 2010–2013 ====
On 8 April 2010, Lucas scored his second European goal for Liverpool, scoring in a 4–1 (5–3 aggregate) quarter-final win over Benfica in the UEFA Europa League quarter-finals.

In pre-season games before the 2010–11 season, Lucas was made captain of a youthful Liverpool side against Grasshopper. On 16 September 2010, Lucas scored his sixth goal for Liverpool shortly after replacing Ryan Babel in the club's first UEFA Europa League group stage match against Steaua București. The goal was Liverpool's third in a 4–1 victory and was scored from 22 yards. On 13 November 2010, Lucas was sent-off for the second time in his Liverpool career after being shown a second yellow card in injury time in a 2–0 defeat to Stoke City. On 6 December, Lucas was voted the fan's pick for Man of the Match on the official Liverpool website. He provided an assist for Ryan Babel, in a 3–0 win over Aston Villa on 6 December.

Lucas was awarded Liverpool Player of the Year Award in May 2011. On 30 March 2011, Lucas signed a new long-term contract at Liverpool.

After a good run of form for Liverpool, his season was cut short on 1 December 2011, when he suffered an ACL injury after colliding with Juan Mata in a 2–0 win over Chelsea in the quarter-finals of the League Cup.

On 10 April 2013, Lucas signed a new long-term deal with Liverpool keeping him at the club until 2018. He was a consistent starter in the opening few months of the 2013–14 season as Liverpool put up an unexpected title challenge, though his season was again cut short by injury. His good form saw him make a return to the Brazil squad.

==== 2014–2017 ====
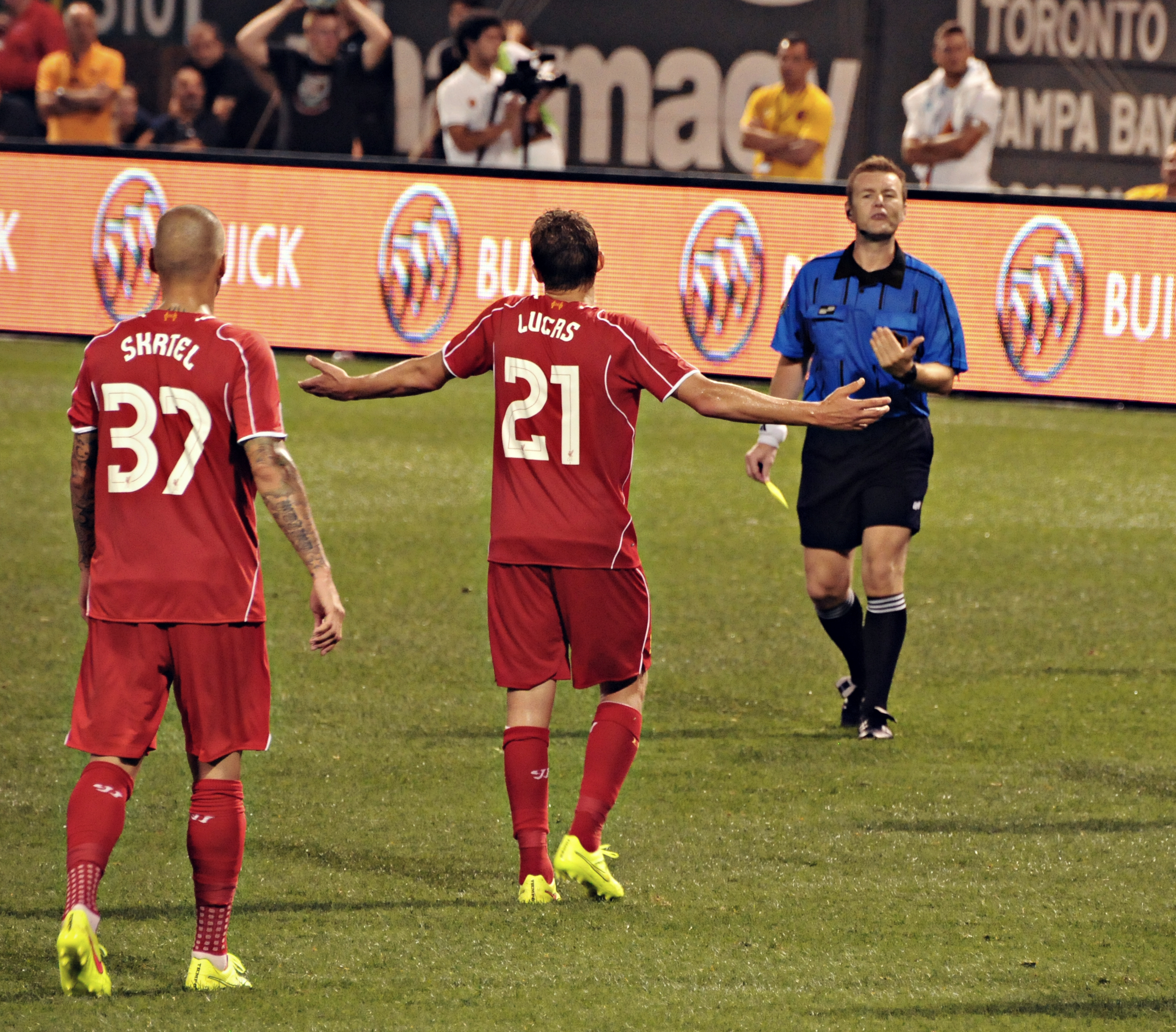
Lucas (right) with Martin Škrtel for Liverpool in 2014

In the initial run of games within the 2014–15 Premier League and other cup competitions, Lucas was rotated in and out of the squad, leading to speculation surrounding a move away from Anfield. He made his comeback, however, as a starter against Ludogorets in the UEFA Champions League with a solid good display. His fine form continued and he started games against Stoke City, Leicester City and Sunderland. Lucas' good run continued as Liverpool then played against Manchester United, Arsenal, Burnley, Swansea City, Leicester City and Sunderland out of which Liverpool only lost to Manchester United and then achieved five games without defeat in a row with Lucas as an integral member of the squad. Lucas was on the substitute bench on 22 March in a 2–1 defeat against Manchester United after coming back from a six-week injury layoff.

Despite rumours of him leaving Anfield, Lucas was restored to the starting line-up. Following the sacking of manager Brendan Rodgers, Lucas under new manager Jürgen Klopp was praised for his excellent form in the club's 11-game unbeaten run. Lucas made his 300th appearance for Liverpool on 26 January 2016 against Stoke City in the Football League Cup semi-final at Anfield. Lucas captained Liverpool in a Premier League match against Crystal Palace on 8 November 2015, which ended in a 2–1 defeat.

On 28 February 2016, Lucas started for Liverpool at centre-back in the 2016 League Cup final. He was one of three Liverpool players who failed to score their penalty-kick as the club lost 3–1 in the shootout to Manchester City.

On 18 January 2017, Lucas scored his first goal for the club since 16 September 2010, a first-half header in the FA Cup third round replay against Plymouth Argyle. The end of the season marked the completion of Lucas's tenth year as a Liverpool player. In celebration, Lucas had a dinner party thrown in his honour and received a Special Recognition Award presented to him by club legend Kenny Dalglish at Liverpool's postseason award ceremony.

=== Lazio ===
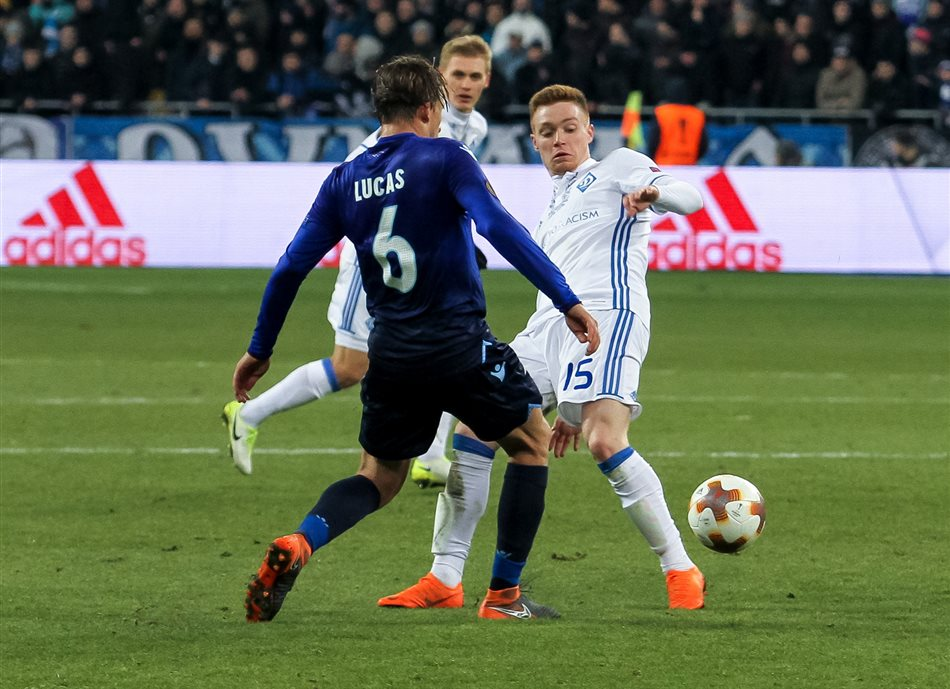
Lucas playing for Lazio during a UEFA Europa League match against Dynamo Kyiv in 2018

On 18 July 2017, Lucas completed a move to Serie A side Lazio for £5 million, ending his 10-year stay at Liverpool.

==== 2017–18 season ====
Lucas made his debut for Lazio in a 3–2 win over Serie A champions Juventus in the Supercoppa Italiana, on 13 August 2017. His first goal for the club was in a 3–2 defeat to Zulte Waregem in the final group game of the UEFA Europa League. On 28 February 2018, Lucas missed a penalty during the penalty shootout in Lazio's match against Milan in the semi-finals of the Coppa Italia; which Lazio eventually lost 4–5.

On 15 March, Lucas scored the opening goal in a 2–0 away win over Dynamo Kyiv in the UEFA Europa League Round of 16 second-leg, securing a (4–2 win on aggregate) and advancement into the quarter-finals of the tournament. On 18 March, Lucas scored his first league goal for the club in a 1–1 draw with Bologna, and on 1 April, he scored in a 6–2 win over Benevento.

He finished the season with 50 appearances in all competitions and was named the club's Player of the Year.

=== Return to Grêmio ===
On 27 June 2022, Lucas returned to Grêmio on a contract until December 2023. On 17 March 2023, he announced his retirement from professional football, following a heart condition being found in December.

== International career ==
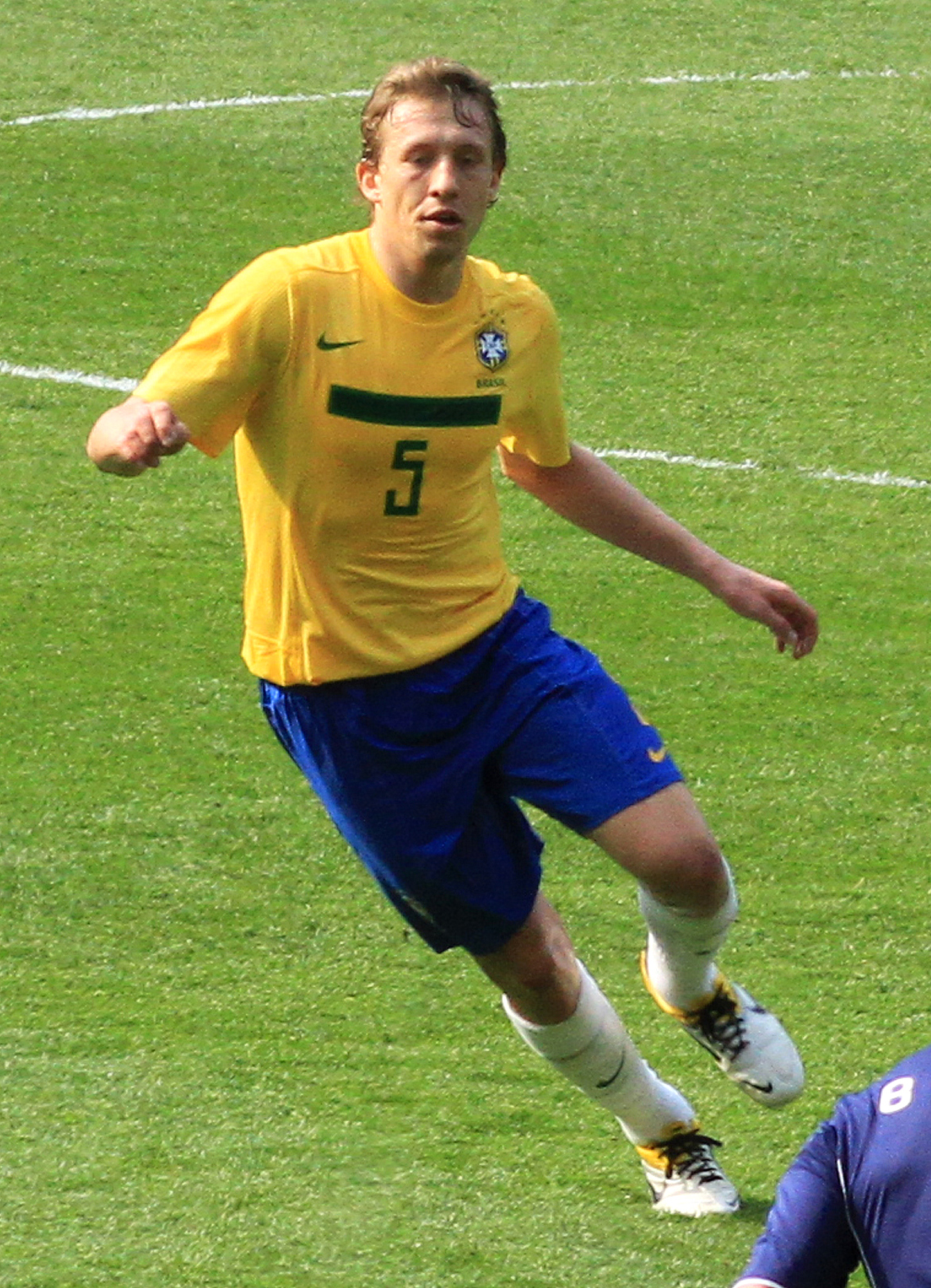
Lucas playing for Brazil in 2011

Lucas is the former captain of the Brazilian under-20 team. He led the team to victory in the 2007 South American Youth Championship, scoring four goals in the process. He was expected to lead the team again in the 2007 FIFA U-20 World Cup held in Canada in July 2007 and was named in their squad, but an injury in training kept him from playing for three weeks, leading to his withdrawal from the squad.

In October 2006, Lucas was included in the senior Brazilian squad for friendlies against Kuwaiti club Al-Kuwait and Ecuador. Lucas was both the youngest member and one of the only two non-Europe based players in a strong squad. He made his debut for Brazil on 7 October 2006 coming on as a second-half substitute against Al-Kuwait. Brazil won the match 4–0, but his appearance did not count as his first cap as the match was not considered as an official friendly match by FIFA.

Lucas gained his first official Brazil international cap on 22 August 2007, coming on as a substitute in a friendly against Algeria. In June 2008, Lucas was named in the Brazil squad for an Olympics warm-up match later in the month.

On 19 August 2008, Lucas was shown a red card in the 2008 Olympics semi-final match between Brazil and Argentina, after a challenge on Liverpool teammate Javier Mascherano, as Argentina ran out 3–0 winners. In August 2009, Lucas was recalled to the senior Brazil squad in place of Flamengo's Kléberson, who was absent through injury. After missing out on the Brazil squad for the 2010 FIFA World Cup in South Africa, Lucas played the full 90 minutes in a 2–0 friendly win against the United States on 10 August 2010.

On 17 July 2011, Lucas was shown a straight red card in the 2011 Copa América play-off quarter-final against Paraguay, after an extra-time altercation with Antolín Alcaraz. Brazil went on to lose the match 2–0 on penalties after the match had finished 0–0 after 90 minutes.

== Style of play ==
During his early career at Grêmio, Lucas operated as a box-to-box midfielder in a diamond formation, where his energy and freedom allowed him to join the attack. After moving to Liverpool, he developed into a defensive midfielder, becoming known for his energy in pressing opponents, positional awareness and ability to break up counter-attacks. Under Jürgen Klopp, he was also deployed as a centre-back, a position in which he made a number of appearances during the later years of his Liverpool career.

== Personal life ==
Lucas is the nephew of Brazilian footballer Leivinha (1949–2026) and also holds an Italian passport due to his Italian ancestry.

In addition to his native Portuguese, Lucas can also speak English, Spanish, and Italian.

== Career statistics ==
=== Club ===
Appearances and goals by club, season and competition
Club	Season	League			State League		National cup		League cup		Continental		Other		Total	
Club	Season	Division	Apps	Goals	Apps	Goals	Apps	Goals	Apps	Goals	Apps	Goals	Apps	Goals	Apps	Goals
Grêmio	2005	Série B	5	0	0	0	0	0	—		—		—		5	0
Grêmio	2006	Série A	32	4	17 (Note: Appearance(s) in Campeonato Gaúcho)	3	4	1	—		—		—		53	8
Grêmio	2007	Série A	3	0	9	2	0	0	—		8 (Note: Appearance(s) in Copa Libertadores)	1	—		20	3
Grêmio	Total		40	4	26	5	4	1	0	0	8	1	0	0	78	11
Liverpool	2007–08	Premier League	18	0	—		4	1	3	0	7 (Note: Appearance(s) in UEFA Champions League)	0	—		32	1
Liverpool	2008–09	Premier League	25	1	—		2	0	2	1	10	1	—		39	3
Liverpool	2009–10	Premier League	35	0	—		2	0	0	0	13 (Note: Five appearances in UEFA Champions League, eight appearances and one goal in UEFA Europa League)	1	—		50	1
Liverpool	2010–11	Premier League	33	0	—		1	0	1	0	12 (Note: Appearance(s) in UEFA Europa League)	1	—		47	1
Liverpool	2011–12	Premier League	12	0	—		0	0	3	0	—		—		15	0
Liverpool	2012–13	Premier League	26	0	—		1	0	0	0	4	0	—		31	0
Liverpool	2013–14	Premier League	27	0	—		1	0	1	0	—		—		29	0
Liverpool	2014–15	Premier League	20	0	—		3	0	5	0	4	0	—		32	0
Liverpool	2015–16	Premier League	26	0	—		1	0	5	0	7	0	—		40	0
Liverpool	2016–17	Premier League	24	0	—		4	1	3	0	—		—		31	1
Liverpool	Total		247	1	0	0	18	2	24	1	57	3	0	0	346	7
Lazio	2017–18	Serie A	36	2	—		4	0	—		9	2	1 (Note: Appearance in Supercoppa Italiana)	0	50	4
Lazio	2018–19	Serie A	27	0	—		5	0	—		4	0	—		36	0
Lazio	2019–20	Serie A	25	0	—		1	0	—		3	0	1	0	30	0
Lazio	2020–21	Serie A	32	0	—		0	0	—		5	0	—		37	0
Lazio	2021–22	Serie A	35	0	—		2	0	—		8	0	—		45	0
Lazio	Total		155	2	0	0	12	0	0	0	29	2	2	0	198	4
Grêmio	2022	Série B	18	3	—		—		—		—		—		18	3
Grêmio	2023	Série A	0	0	0	0	0	0	—		—		—		0	0
Grêmio	Total		18	3	0	0	0	0	0	0	0	0	0	0	18	3
Career total			460	10	26	5	34	3	24	1	94	6	2	0	640	25

=== International ===
Appearances and goals by national team and year
National team	Year	Apps	Goals
Brazil	2007	1	0
Brazil	2008	2	0
Brazil	2009	1	0
Brazil	2010	4	0
Brazil	2011	12	0
Brazil	2013	4	0
Total		24	0

== Honours ==
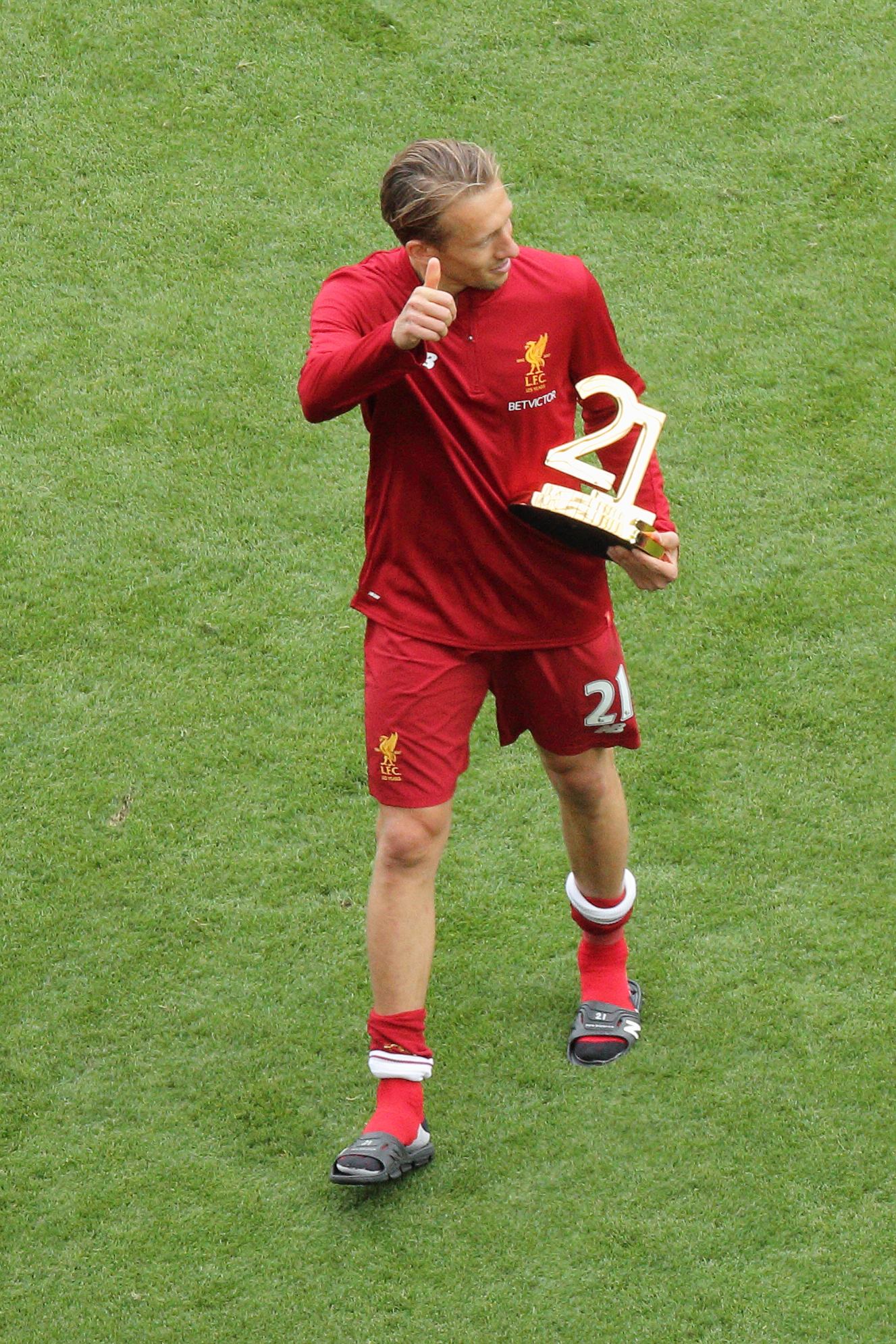
At the end of the 2016–17 season, Lucas received a commemorative trophy to mark 10 years at Liverpool.

Grêmio

- Campeonato Brasileiro Série B: 2005
- Campeonato Gaúcho: 2006, 2007
- Copa Libertadores runner-up: 2007

Liverpool

- Football League Cup: 2011–12; runner-up: 2015–16
- UEFA Europa League runner-up: 2015–16

Lazio

- Coppa Italia: 2018–19
- Supercoppa Italiana: 2017, 2019

Brazil Olympic

- Summer Olympics bronze medal: 2008

Individual

- Bola de Ouro: 2006
- Bola de Prata: 2006
- Campeonato Brasileiro Série A Team of the Year: 2006
- Liverpool Player of the Year: 2010–11
- Premier League Player of the Year by Northwest Football Awards: 2011
- Lazio Player of the Season: 2017–18, 2018–19
