= FA Youth Cup Finals of the 2000s =

List of English football matches

FA Youth Cup Finals from 2000 to 2009.

== 2008–09: Arsenal vs Liverpool (4–1 and 2–1, 6–2 Aggregate) ==
=== First leg ===
22 May 2009
20:00 BST

Arsenal	4–1	Liverpool
Sunu 20'; Wilshere 34' (pen.); Watt 57'; Emmanuel-Thomas 66'	Report	Kačaniklić 36'

Emirates Stadium, London
Attendance: 33,662
Referee: Lee Mason

Note: Flags indicate national team as defined under FIFA eligibility rules; some limited exceptions apply. Players may hold more than one non-FIFA nationality.

Arsenal
No.	Pos.	Nation	Player
1	GK	ENG	James Shea
2	DF	ENG	Craig Eastmond
3	DF	ENG	Thomas Cruise
4	MF	GHA	Emmanuel Frimpong (substituted off) 17'
5	DF	ENG	Kyle Bartley
6	DF	ENG	Luke Ayling
7	MF	ENG	Henri Lansbury
8	MF	FRA	Francis Coquelin
9	FW	TOG	Gilles Sunu (substituted off) 75'
10	MF	ENG	Jack Wilshere (substituted off) 90'
11	MF	ENG	Jay Emmanuel-Thomas (c)
Sub	FW	IRL	Rhys Murphy (substituted on) 75'
Sub	GK	ENG	Charlie Mann
Sub	FW	ENG	Sanchez Watt (substituted on) 17'
Sub	MF	IRL	Conor Henderson (substituted on) 90'
Sub	DF	CMR	Cedric Evina

Liverpool
No.	Pos.	Nation	Player
1	GK	AUS	Dean Bouzanis
2	DF	ENG	Karl Clair
3	DF	GER	Christopher Buchtmann
4	DF	ESP	Daniel Ayala
5	DF	ENG	Joe Kennedy (c)
6	MF	ENG	Andre Wisdom
7	MF	ENG	David Amoo
8	MF	ENG	Steven Irwin
9	FW	FIN	Lauri Dalla Valle (substituted off) 80'
10	FW	ENG	Tom Ince
11	MF	SWE	Alexander Kačaniklić (substituted off) 64'
Sub	FW	ENG	Nathan Eccleston (substituted on) 64'
Sub	GK	ENG	Deale Chamberlain
Sub	MF	ENG	Michael Roberts
Sub	MF	SCO	Alex Cooper
Sub	DF	ENG	Jack Robinson (substituted on) 80'

=== Second leg ===
26 May 2009
19:45 BST

Liverpool	1–2	Arsenal
Dalla Valle 52'	Report	Watt 25'; Ayala 70' (o.g.)

Anfield, Liverpool
Attendance: 7,792
Referee: Lee Mason

Note: Flags indicate national team as defined under FIFA eligibility rules; some limited exceptions apply. Players may hold more than one non-FIFA nationality.

Liverpool
No.	Pos.	Nation	Player
1	GK	AUS	Dean Bouzanis
2	DF	ENG	Steven Irwin
3	DF	ENG	Jack Robinson
4	DF	ESP	Daniel Ayala
5	DF	ENG	Joe Kennedy (c)
6	MF	ENG	Andre Wisdom (substituted off) 84'
7	MF	ENG	David Amoo
8	MF	GER	Christopher Buchtmann (substituted off) 84'
9	FW	FIN	Lauri Dalla Valle
10	FW	ENG	Tom Ince
11	MF	SWE	Alexander Kačaniklić (substituted off) 46'
Sub	FW	ENG	Nathan Eccleston (substituted on) 46'
Sub	GK	ENG	Deale Chamberlain
Sub	MF	SCO	Alex Cooper (substituted on) 84'
Sub	MF	ENG	Michael Roberts
Sub	DF	ENG	Karl Clair (substituted on) 84'

Arsenal
No.	Pos.	Nation	Player
1	GK	ENG	James Shea
2	DF	ENG	Craig Eastmond
3	DF	ENG	Thomas Cruise (substituted off) 83'
4	MF	ENG	Jack Wilshere
5	DF	ENG	Kyle Bartley
6	DF	ENG	Luke Ayling
7	MF	ENG	Henri Lansbury
8	MF	FRA	Francis Coquelin
9	FW	TOG	Gilles Sunu (substituted off) 68'
10	MF	ENG	Sanchez Watt
11	MF	ENG	Jay Emmanuel-Thomas (c) (substituted off) 83'
Sub	FW	IRL	Rhys Murphy (substituted on) 68'
Sub	GK	ENG	Charlie Mann
Sub	MF	TUR	Oğuzhan Özyakup
Sub	MF	IRL	Conor Henderson (substituted on) 83'
Sub	DF	CMR	Cedric Evina (substituted on) 83'

== 2007–08: Manchester City vs Chelsea (1–1, 3–1) ==
=== First leg ===
3 April 2008

Chelsea	1–1	Manchester City
Kakuta 66'		Sturridge 49'

Stamford Bridge, Fulham
Attendance: 11,980
Referee: Peter Walton

=== Second leg ===
16 April 2008

Manchester City	3–1	Chelsea
Mee 23'; Weiss 34'; Ball 86' (pen.)	Report	McGivern 6' (o.g.)

City of Manchester Stadium, Manchester
Attendance: 19,783
Referee: Peter Walton

Note: Flags indicate national team as defined under FIFA eligibility rules; some limited exceptions apply. Players may hold more than one non-FIFA nationality.

Manchester City
No.	Pos.	Nation	Player
1	GK	ENG	Greg Hartley
2	DF	BEL	Dedryck Boyata (substituted off) 82'
3	DF	ENG	Ben Mee (c)
4	DF	ENG	Kieran Trippier (substituted off) 90+5'
5	DF	NIR	Ryan McGivern
6	MF	ENG	Andrew Tutte
7	MF	SVK	Vladimír Weiss
8	MF	ENG	Scott Kay
9	FW	ENG	David Ball
10	FW	SVK	Róbert Mak
11	MF	IRL	Donal McDermott
Sub	GK	SVK	Filip Mentel
Sub	MF	NOR	Abdisalam Ibrahim (substituted on) 90+5'
Sub	MF	CYP	Angelos Tsiaklis (substituted on) 82'
Sub	FW	LBR	Alex Nimely
Sub	FW	ENG	James Poole

Chelsea
No.	Pos.	Nation	Player
1	GK	WAL	Rhys Taylor
2	DF	ENG	Seth Nana Twumasi (c)
3	DF	NED	Jeffrey Bruma
4	DF	NED	Patrick van Aanholt
5	DF	ENG	Ben Gordon (substituted off) 72'
6	MF	ENG	Michael Woods
7	MF	ESP	Sergio Tejera
8	MF	ENG	Jacob Mellis (red card) 90'
9	FW	COD	Gaël Kakuta
10	FW	DEN	Morten Nielsen (substituted off) 54'
11	FW	SVK	Miroslav Stoch
Sub	GK	ALB	Aldi Haxhia
Sub	FW	ENG	Adam Phillip (substituted on) 54'
Sub	DF	ENG	Frank Nouble (substituted on) 72'
Sub	DF	ENG	Jack Saville
Sub	MF	ENG	Tom Taiwo

== 2006–07: Liverpool vs Manchester United (1–2 and 1–0, 2–2 Aggregate, 4–3 Penalty shootout) ==
=== First leg ===
16 April 2007

Liverpool	1–2	Manchester United
Lindfield 16'	Report	Threlfall 49' (o.g.); Hewson 74' (pen.)

Anfield, Liverpool
Attendance: 19,518
Referee: Mark Clattenburg

Note: Flags indicate national team as defined under FIFA eligibility rules; some limited exceptions apply. Players may hold more than one non-FIFA nationality.

Liverpool
No.	Pos.	Nation	Player
1	GK	DEN	Martin Hansen
2	DF	ENG	Stephen Darby
3	DF	ENG	Michael Burns
4	DF	ENG	Jay Spearing (c)
5	DF	ENG	Robbie Threlfall
6	MF	ENG	Charlie Barnett
7	MF	IRL	Jimmy Ryan
8	MF	SCO	Ryan Flynn
9	FW	ENG	Craig Lindfield
10	FW	ENG	Lee Woodward (substituted off) 67'
11	MF	ENG	Ray Putterill
12	FW	ENG	Steven Irwin
13	GK	ENG	David Roberts
14	MF	ENG	Sean Highdale
15	MF	ENG	Ben Parsonage
16	FW	ENG	Nathan Eccleston (substituted on) 67'

Manchester United
No.	Pos.	Nation	Player
1	GK	GER	Ron-Robert Zieler
2	DF	ENG	Richard Eckersley
3	DF	NIR	Corry Evans
4	DF	ENG	Kenny Strickland
5	DF	WAL	James Chester
6	MF	ENG	Danny Drinkwater (substituted off) 75'
7	MF	ENG	Danny Welbeck
8	MF	ENG	Sam Hewson (c)
9	FW	SKN	Febian Brandy (substituted off) 90'
10	FW	IRL	Chris Fagan
11	MF	SCO	Danny Galbraith
12	MF	IRL	Conor McCormack
13	GK	ENG	Gary Woods
14	MF	ENG	Antonio Bryan (substituted on) 75'
15	MF	ENG	Matty James (substituted on) 90'
16	DF	ENG	Scott Moffatt

=== Second leg ===
26 April 2007

Manchester United	0–1	Liverpool
	Report	Threlfall 56'
Penalties
Eikrem (penalty missed); Fagan (penalty scored); Chester (penalty scored); Galbraith (penalty scored); Hewson (penalty missed)	3–4	(penalty scored) Putterill; (penalty scored) Lindfield; (penalty scored) Flynn; (penalty scored) Threlfall

Old Trafford, Manchester
Attendance: 24,347
Referee: Mark Clattenburg

Manchester United	Liverpool

Note: Flags indicate national team as defined under FIFA eligibility rules; some limited exceptions apply. Players may hold more than one non-FIFA nationality.

Manchester United
No.	Pos.	Nation	Player
1	GK	GER	Ron-Robert Zieler
2	DF	ENG	Richard Eckersley
3	DF	NIR	Corry Evans (substituted off) 99'
4	DF	ENG	Kenny Strickland
5	DF	WAL	James Chester
6	MF	ENG	Danny Drinkwater (substituted off) 72'
7	MF	ENG	Danny Welbeck (substituted off) 87'
14	MF	ENG	Sam Hewson (c)
9	FW	SKN	Febian Brandy
10	FW	IRL	Chris Fagan
11	MF	SCO	Danny Galbraith
Sub	GK	ENG	Gary Woods
Sub	DF	ENG	Scott Moffatt (substituted on) 99'
Sub	MF	ENG	Antonio Bryan (substituted on) 72'
Sub	MF	NOR	Magnus Wolff Eikrem (substituted on) 87'
Sub	MF	IRL	Conor McCormack

Liverpool
No.	Pos.	Nation	Player
1	GK	ENG	David Roberts
2	DF	ENG	Jay Spearing (c)
3	DF	ENG	Robbie Threlfall
4	DF	ENG	Stephen Darby
5	DF	ENG	Michael Burns
6	MF	IRL	Jimmy Ryan (substituted off) 94'
7	MF	ENG	Ray Putterill
8	MF	SCO	Ryan Flynn
9	FW	ENG	Craig Lindfield
10	FW	SWE	Astrit Ajdarević (substituted off) 81'
11	MF	ENG	Charlie Barnett
Sub	GK	ENG	Josh Mimms
Sub	DF	ENG	Steven Irwin (substituted on) 81'
Sub	MF	ENG	Sean Highdale
Sub	MF	ENG	Ben Parsonage
Sub	FW	ENG	Lee Woodward (substituted on) 94'

== 2005–06: Liverpool vs Manchester City (3–0 and 0–2, 3–2 Aggregate) ==
=== First Leg ===
13 April 2006

Liverpool	3–0	Manchester City
Threlfall 18'; Flynn 32'; Roqué 84'

Anfield, Liverpool
Attendance: 12,744

=== Second Leg ===
20 April 2006

Manchester City	2–0	Liverpool
Sturridge 32', 56'	Report

City of Manchester Stadium, Manchester
Attendance: 10,601

Note: Flags indicate national team as defined under FIFA eligibility rules; some limited exceptions apply. Players may hold more than one non-FIFA nationality.

Liverpool
No.	Pos.	Nation	Player
1	GK	ENG	David Roberts
2	DF	ENG	Stephen Darby
3	DF	ENG	Robbie Threlfall
4	DF	ENG	Jack Hobbs
5	DF	ESP	Godwin Antwi
6	MF	ENG	Charlie Barnett
7	MF	ENG	Paul Barratt
8	MF	SCO	Ryan Flynn
9	FW	ENG	Craig Lindfield
10	MF	ENG	Paul Anderson
11	MF	ENG	Adam Hammill
Sub	GK	ENG	Josh Mimms
Sub	DF	ESP	Miki Roqué
Sub	MF	IRL	Jimmy Ryan
Sub	MF	ENG	Jay Spearing
Sub	FW	ENG	Michael Nardiello

Manchester City
No.	Pos.	Nation	Player
1	GK	ENG	Laurence Matthewson
2	DF	ENG	Curtis Obeng
3	DF	ENG	Shaleum Logan
4	DF	ENG	Sam Williamson
5	DF	IRL	Garry Breen
6	MF	ENG	Ashley Williams
7	MF	ENG	Paul Marshall
8	MF	ENG	Michael Johnson
9	MF	IRL	Karl Moore
10	FW	ENG	Kelvin Etuhu
11	FW	ENG	Daniel Sturridge
Sub	GK	HUN	David Vadon
Sub	DF	ENG	Micah Richards
Sub	DF	IRL	Michael Daly
Sub	MF	FRO	Christian Mouritsen
Sub	FW	WAL	Ched Evans
Sub	MF	ENG	Adam Clayton
Sub		ENG	S. Evans

== 2004–05: Ipswich Town vs Southampton (1–0 and 2–2, 3–2 Aggregate) ==
=== First Leg ===
18 April 2005
19:45 GMT

Southampton	2–2	Ipswich Town
McGoldrick 45' (pen.); Best 63'	Report	Lordan 48', 58'

St Mary's Stadium, Southampton
Attendance: 9,902
Referee: Andre Marriner

=== Second Leg ===
22 April 2005

Ipswich Town	1–0 (a.e.t.)	Southampton
Upson 118'	Report

Portman Road, Ipswich
Attendance: 14,889
Referee: Andre Marriner

Note: Flags indicate national team as defined under FIFA eligibility rules; some limited exceptions apply. Players may hold more than one non-FIFA nationality.

Ipswich Town
No.	Pos.	Nation	Player
1	GK	IRL	Shane Supple
2	MF	ENG	Sammy Moore
3	DF	IRL	Michael Synnott
4	DF	ENG	James Krause
5	DF	NIR	Chris Casement
6	DF	ENG	Aidan Collins
7	MF	IRL	Cathal Lordan
8	MF	ENG	Liam Trotter
9	FW	ENG	Darryl Knights
10	MF	IRL	Owen Garvan
11	MF	SCO	Liam Craig
Sub	FW	ENG	Danny Haynes
Sub	FW	ENG	Blair Hammond
Sub	FW	ENG	Charlie Sheringham
Sub	MF	ENG	Ed Upson
Sub	GK	ENG	Andy Reynolds
Sub	DF	ENG	Stuart Ainsley

Southampton
No.	Pos.	Nation	Player
1	GK	SCO	Andrew McNeil
2	DF	ENG	Craig Richards
3	DF	FRA	Sebastian Wallis-Taylor
4	FW	IRL	David McGoldrick
5	DF	ENG	Sean Rudd
6	DF	FIN	Tim Sparv
7	MF	WAL	Lloyd James
8	MF	ENG	Tom Curran
9	FW	ENG	Theo Walcott
10	FW	IRL	Leon Best
11	MF	ENG	Nathan Dyer
Sub	FW	ENG	Adam Lallana
Sub	MF	POR	Feliciano Condesso
Sub	DF	WAL	Kyle Critchell
Sub	DF	WAL	Gareth Bale

== 2003–04: Middlesbrough vs Aston Villa (3–0 and 1–0, 4–0 Aggregate) ==
=== First Leg ===
15 April 2004

Aston Villa	0–3	Middlesbrough
	Report	Wheater 47'; Morrison 59', 78' (pen.)

Villa Park, Aston
Attendance: 6,551
Referee: A. D’Urso

=== Second Leg ===
19 April 2004

Middlesbrough	1–0	Aston Villa
Kennedy 48'	Report

Riverside Stadium, Middlesbrough
Attendance: 16,321
Referee: A. D’Urso

Note: Flags indicate national team as defined under FIFA eligibility rules; some limited exceptions apply. Players may hold more than one non-FIFA nationality.

Middlesbrough
No.	Pos.	Nation	Player
1	GK	ENG	David Knight
2	DF	ENG	Anthony McMahon
3	DF	ENG	Peter Masters
4	MF	ENG	Jason Kennedy
5	DF	ENG	Matthew Bates
6	DF	ENG	David Wheater
7	MF	SCO	James Morrison
8	MF	ENG	Gary Liddle
9	FW	ENG	Tom Craddock
10	MF	ENG	Andrew Taylor
11	FW	ENG	Anthony Peacock
Sub	MF	ENG	Adam Johnson
Sub	MF	ENG	Josh Walker
Sub		ENG	Danny Read

Aston Villa
No.	Pos.	Nation	Player
1	GK	AUT	Bobby Olejnik
2	DF	NIR	Jamie Ward
3	DF	ENG	Paul Green
4	MF	ENG	Craig Gardner
5	DF	DEN	Magnus Troest
6	DF	ENG	Gary Cahill
7	MF	BEL	Christian Kabeya
8	MF	IRL	Steven Foley-Sheridan
9	FW	ENG	Gabriel Agbonlahor
10	FW	ENG	Luke Moore
11	MF	ENG	Kyle Nix
Sub	DF	ENG	Lee Grant
Sub	FW	ENG	Shane Paul
Sub		ENG	Oluwaseyi Morgan

== 2002–03: Manchester United vs Middlesbrough (2–0 and 1–1, 3–1 Aggregate) ==
=== Second leg ===
25 April 2003

Manchester United	1–1	Middlesbrough
Johnson 14'		Liddle 78'

Old Trafford, Manchester
Attendance: 14,849

Note: Flags indicate national team as defined under FIFA eligibility rules; some limited exceptions apply. Players may hold more than one non-FIFA nationality.

Manchester United
No.	Pos.	Nation	Player
1	GK	ENG	Luke Steele
2	DF	ENG	Lee Sims
3	DF	ENG	Lee Lawrence
4	DF	SCO	Phil Bardsley
5	DF	IRL	Paul McShane
6	MF	ENG	David Jones (Capt.)
7	MF	ENG	Chris Eagles
8	FW	ENG	Sylvan Ebanks-Blake
9	FW	ENG	Eddie Johnson
10	MF	ENG	Kieran Richardson
11	MF	ENG	Ben Collett
Sub	DF	ENG	Mark Howard (substituted on) 75'
Sub	GK	ENG	Tom Heaton
Sub	FW	ENG	David Poole
Sub	FW	WAL	Ramon Calliste
Sub	DF	ENG	Phil Picken
Manager		SCO	Brian McClair

Middlesbrough
No.	Pos.	Nation	Player
1	GK	ENG	Ross Turnbull
2	DF	ENG	Anthony McMahon
3	DF	ENG	Alan Harrison (substituted off) 58'
4	DF	ENG	Matthew Bates
5	MF	ENG	Andrew Davies (Capt.)
6	DF	ENG	David Wheater
7	MF	SCO	James Morrison
8	MF	ENG	Andrew Taylor
9	MF	ENG	Anthony Peacock
10	FW	ENG	Gary Liddle
11	FW	NIR	Chris Brunt
Sub	DF	ENG	Peter Masters (substituted on) 85'
Sub	GK	ENG	David Knight
Sub	FW	SWE	Niklas Nordgren (substituted on) 46'
Sub	MF	ENG	Danny Reed (substituted on) 58'
Sub	MF	ENG	Jason Kennedy
Manager		ENG	Mark Proctor

=== First leg ===
15 April 2003

Middlesbrough	0–2	Manchester United
		Richardson 4'; Collett 90'

Riverside Stadium, Middlesbrough
Attendance: 8,310

Note: Flags indicate national team as defined under FIFA eligibility rules; some limited exceptions apply. Players may hold more than one non-FIFA nationality.

Middlesbrough
No.	Pos.	Nation	Player
1	GK	ENG	Ross Turnbull
2	DF	ENG	Anthony McMahon
3	DF	ENG	Alan Harrison
4	DF	ENG	Matthew Bates
5	MF	ENG	Andrew Davies (Capt.)
6	DF	ENG	David Wheater
7	MF	SCO	James Morrison
8	MF	ENG	Andrew Taylor
9	MF	ENG	Anthony Peacock
10	FW	ENG	Gary Liddle
11	FW	NIR	Chris Brunt
Sub	DF	ENG	Peter Masters
Sub	GK	ENG	David Knight
Sub	MF	ENG	Jason Kennedy
Sub	MF	ENG	Danny Ready
Sub	FW	SWE	Niklas Nordgren
Manager		ENG	Mark Proctor

Manchester United
No.	Pos.	Nation	Player
1	GK	ENG	Luke Steele
2	DF	ENG	Lee Sims
3	DF	ENG	Lee Lawrence
4	DF	SCO	Phil Bardsley
5	DF	IRL	Paul McShane
6	MF	ENG	David Jones (Capt.)
7	MF	ENG	Chris Eagles
8	MF	ENG	Kieran Richardson
9	MF	ENG	Ben Collett
10	FW	DEN	Mads Timm
11	FW	ENG	Eddie Johnson
Sub	FW	ENG	Sylvan Ebanks-Blake
Sub	GK	ENG	Tom Heaton
Sub	FW	ENG	David Poole
Sub	DF	ENG	Mark Howard
Sub	FW	WAL	Ramon Calliste
Manager		SCO	Brian McClair

== 2001–02: Aston Villa vs Everton (4–1 and 0–1, 4–2 Aggregate) ==
Stefan Moore captained Villa's youth in the final, and was named as man of the match as Villa beat Everton in the first leg.

Wayne Rooney scored eight goals in eight games during Everton's run to the 2002 finals. This included one goal in the final defeat against Aston Villa and, upon scoring, he revealed a T-shirt that read, "Once a Blue, always a Blue."

=== First Leg ===
14 May 2002

Everton	1–4	Aston Villa
Rooney 23'	Report	Moore 37', 53'; Hynes 68'; Moore 79'

Goodison Park, Walton
Attendance: 15,280
Referee: B Knight

=== Second Leg ===
18 May 2002

Aston Villa	0–1	Everton
	Report	Brown 75'

Villa Park, Aston
Attendance: 18,651
Referee: B Knight

Note: Flags indicate national team as defined under FIFA eligibility rules; some limited exceptions apply. Players may hold more than one non-FIFA nationality.

Aston Villa
No.	Pos.	Nation	Player
1	GK	IRL	Wayne Henderson
2	DF	ENG	Andrew Wells
3	DF	ENG	Peter Whittingham
4	MF	SCO	Colin Marshall
5	DF	ENG	James O'Connor
6	DF	ENG	Liam Ridgewell
7	MF	NIR	Steven Davis
8	MF	IRL	Peter Hynes
9	FW	ENG	Stefan Moore
10	MF	IRL	Steven Foley-Sheridan
11	FW	ENG	Luke Moore
Sub	DF	ENG	Ryan Amoo
Sub	FW	ENG	Michael Husbands
Sub	FW	NIR	David Scullion
Sub		ENG	Mark Atkinson

Everton
No.	Pos.	Nation	Player
1	GK	ENG	Andrew Pettinger
2	DF	ENG	Brian Moogan
3	DF	ENG	Martin Crowder
4	DF	ENG	Alan Moogan
5	DF	ENG	Steven Schumacher
6	MF	WAL	Craig Garside
7	MF	ENG	Scott Brown
8	MF	ENG	Steven Beck
9	FW	ENG	Michael Symes
10	FW	ENG	Wayne Rooney
11	MF	AUS	David Carney
Sub	FW	ENG	Paul Hopkins
Sub		ENG	Franklyn Colbeck
Sub		ENG	Alex Cole
Sub		ENG	Damon Martland
Sub		ENG	Robert Southern

== 2000–01: Arsenal vs Blackburn Rovers (5–0 and 1–3, 6–3 Aggregate) ==
=== First Leg ===
18 May 2001

Arsenal	5–0	Blackburn Rovers
Aliadiere 12', 67'; Thomas 13'; Sidwell 57'; Volz 80'	Report

Highbury Stadium, Highbury
Attendance: 4,056
Referee: Jeff Winter

=== Second Leg ===
22 May 2001

Blackburn Rovers	3–1	Arsenal
Walters 13'; Morgan 42'; Danns 60'	Report	Svard 45'

Ewood Park, Blackburn
Attendance: 2,411
Referee: Jeff Winter

Note: Flags indicate national team as defined under FIFA eligibility rules; some limited exceptions apply. Players may hold more than one non-FIFA nationality.

Arsenal
No.	Pos.	Nation	Player
1	GK	ENG	Craig Holloway
2	DF	ENG	Alex Bailey
3	DF	DEN	Sebastian Svard
4	DF	ENG	Ryan Garry
5	DF	CYP	Nicky Nicolau
6	DF	GER	Moritz Volz
7	MF	ENG	Steve Sidwell
8	MF	ENG	Rohan Ricketts
9	FW	ENG	Jerome Thomas
10	MF	ENG	Jermaine Pennant
11	FW	FRA	Jérémie Aliadière
Sub	GK	ENG	Michael Jordan
Sub	DF	TRI	Justin Hoyte
Sub	DF	ENG	Ben Chorley
Sub	MF	ENG	Stephen Santry
Sub	FW	ENG	Jermaine Brown
Sub	FW	COD	Carlin Itonga

Blackburn Rovers
No.	Pos.	Nation	Player
1	GK	ENG	Ryan Robinson
2	DF	ENG	Daniel Stone
3	DF	ENG	Darren Hockenhull
4	DF	ENG	Robert Woodhead
5	DF	ENG	Michael Cole
6	MF	ENG	Liam Blakeman
7	MF	ENG	Jerome Watt
8	MF	GUY	Neil Danns
9	MF	SCO	Alan Morgan
10	FW	ENG	Ryan Hevicon
11	FW	IRL	Jonathan Walters
Sub	MF	ENG	Ciaran Donnelly
Sub	FW	ENG	Andrew Bell
Sub		ENG	Black

== 1999–2000: Arsenal vs Coventry City (3–1 and 2–0, 5–1 Aggregate) ==
=== First leg ===
4 May 2000

Coventry City	1–3	Arsenal
McSheffrey 85'		Thomas 48'; Barrett 65'; Sidwell 68'

Highfield Road, Coventry
Attendance: 10,280
Referee: Steve Bennett

Note: Flags indicate national team as defined under FIFA eligibility rules; some limited exceptions apply. Players may hold more than one non-FIFA nationality.

Coventry City
No.	Pos.	Nation	Player
1	GK	ENG	Gary Montgomery
2	DF	SWE	Richard Spong
3	DF	ENG	Calum Davenport
4	DF	ENG	Thomas Cudworth
5	DF	ENG	Daniel Hall
6	MF	ENG	Craig Pead
7	MF	SCO	Craig Strachan
8	MF	WAL	Lee Fowler
9	MF	ENG	Robert Betts
9	FW	ENG	Simon Parkinson
10	FW	ENG	Gary McSheffrey
Sub		ENG	Jason Ashby
Sub	MF	SCO	Martin Grant
Sub		ENG	Mark Magennis
Sub	DF	ENG	Aaron Shanahan
Sub	GK	ENG	Adam Mehmet

Arsenal
No.	Pos.	Nation	Player
1	GK	IRL	Graham Stack
2	DF	BRA	Israel da Silva
3	DF	ENG	Liam Chilvers
4	DF	ENG	John Halls
5	DF	ITA	Niccolo Galli
6	MF	ENG	Rohan Ricketts
7	MF	SCO	David Noble
8	MF	ENG	Steve Sidwell
9	FW	ENG	Jerome Thomas
10	FW	ENG	Jay Bothroyd
11	FW	IRL	Graham Barrett
Sub	GK	ENG	Craig Holloway
Sub	DF	ENG	Jermaine Brown
Sub	MF	ENG	Stephen Santry
Sub	FW	ENG	Jonathan Osei-Kuffour
Sub	FW	ENG	Ben Chorley
Sub	FW	COD	Carlin Itonga

=== Second leg ===
12 May 2000

Arsenal	2–0	Coventry City
Bothroyd 38'; Sidwell 72'

Highbury, London
Attendance: 14,706
Referee: Steve Bennett

Note: Flags indicate national team as defined under FIFA eligibility rules; some limited exceptions apply. Players may hold more than one non-FIFA nationality.

Arsenal
No.	Pos.	Nation	Player
1	GK	IRL	Graham Stack
2	DF	GER	Moritz Volz
3	DF	ENG	Liam Chilvers
4	DF	ENG	John Halls
5	DF	ITA	Niccolo Galli
6	MF	ENG	Rohan Ricketts
7	MF	SCO	David Noble
8	MF	ENG	Steve Sidwell
9	FW	ENG	Jermaine Pennant
10	FW	ENG	Jay Bothroyd
11	FW	IRL	Graham Barrett
Sub	GK	ENG	Craig Holloway
Sub	MF	ENG	Stephen Santry
Sub	FW	ENG	Jonathan Osei-Kuffour
Sub	FW	ENG	Ben Chorley
Sub	DF	BRA	Israel da Silva

Coventry City
No.	Pos.	Nation	Player
1	GK	ENG	Gary Montgomery
2	DF	SWE	Richard Spong
3	DF	ENG	Calum Davenport
4	DF	ENG	Thomas Cudworth
5	DF	ENG	Daniel Hall
6	MF	ENG	Craig Pead
7	MF	SCO	Craig Strachan
8	MF	WAL	Lee Fowler
9	MF	ENG	Robert Betts
10	FW	ENG	Gary McSheffrey
11	FW	ENG	Jason Ashby
Sub	FW	ENG	Simon Parkinson
Sub	MF	SCO	Martin Grant
Sub	MF	ENG	Mark Magennis
Sub	DF	ENG	Aaron Shanahan
Sub	GK	ENG	Adam Mehmet
