= 2006–07 Liverpool F.C. season =

English football club season

Liverpool
2006–07 season
- Chairman: David Moores (until February); Tom Hicks and George Gillett (from February)
- Manager: Rafael Benítez
- FA Premier League: 3rd
- FA Cup: Third round
- League Cup: Quarter-finals
- UEFA Champions League: Runners-up
- FA Community Shield: Winners
- Top goalscorer: League: Dirk Kuyt (12); All: Peter Crouch (18)
| Home colours | Away colours | Third colours |

The 2006–07 season was the 115th season in Liverpool Football Club's existence and was their 45th consecutive year in the top-flight, and covers the period between 1 July 2006 to 30 June 2007. Having finished third the previous season, Liverpool had qualified for the UEFA Champions League third qualifying round.

== Players ==
=== First-team squad ===
Note: Flags indicate national team as defined under FIFA eligibility rules; some limited exceptions apply. Players may hold more than one non-FIFA nationality.

| No. | Pos. | Nation | Player |
|---|---|---|---|
| 1 | GK | POL | Jerzy Dudek |
| 2 | DF | ESP | Álvaro Arbeloa |
| 3 | DF | IRL | Steve Finnan |
| 4 | DF | FIN | Sami Hyypiä |
| 5 | DF | DEN | Daniel Agger |
| 6 | DF | NOR | John Arne Riise |
| 7 | MF | AUS | Harry Kewell |
| 8 | MF | ENG | Steven Gerrard (captain) |
| 9 | FW | ENG | Robbie Fowler |
| 10 | MF | ESP | Luis García |
| 11 | MF | CHI | Mark González (Note: González was born in Durban, South Africa, but was raised in Chile from the age of 10 and made his international debut for Chile in 2003.) |
| 12 | DF | BRA | Fábio Aurélio |
| 14 | MF | ESP | Xabi Alonso |
| 15 | FW | ENG | Peter Crouch |
| 16 | MF | ENG | Jermaine Pennant |
| 17 | FW | WAL | Craig Bellamy |
| 18 | FW | NED | Dirk Kuyt |

| No. | Pos. | Nation | Player |
|---|---|---|---|
| 20 | MF | ARG | Javier Mascherano |
| 22 | MF | MLI | Mohamed Sissoko (Note: Sissoko was born in Mont-Saint-Aignan, France, but also qualified to represent Mali internationally and made his international debut for Mali in 2004.) |
| 23 | DF | ENG | Jamie Carragher (vice-captain) |
| 24 | FW | FRA | Florent Sinama Pongolle |
| 25 | GK | ESP | Pepe Reina |
| 26 | MF | ENG | Paul Anderson |
| 28 | DF | ENG | Stephen Warnock |
| 29 | DF | ARG | Gabriel Paletta (Note: Paletta was born in Buenos Aires, Argentina, and represented them at U-20 level, but also holds an Italian passport due to his great-grandfather originating from Italy, and would make his international debut for Italy in June 2014.) |
| 30 | GK | ITA | Daniele Padelli (on loan from Sampdoria) |
| 32 | MF | NED | Boudewijn Zenden |
| 34 | DF | ESP | Miki Roqué |
| 35 | MF | ENG | Danny Guthrie |
| 37 | MF | ENG | Lee Peltier |
| 42 | FW | MAR | Nabil El Zhar (Note: El Zhar was born in Alès, France, and has represented them at U-20 level, but also qualified to represent Morocco internationally through his parents and would make his international debut for Morocco in March 2008.) |
| 45 | DF | ENG | James Smith |
| 48 | DF | ARG | Emiliano Insúa |

=== Reserves ===
These players did not appear for the first-team this season, but may have been a substitute.

Note: Flags indicate national team as defined under FIFA eligibility rules; some limited exceptions apply. Players may hold more than one non-FIFA nationality.

| No. | Pos. | Nation | Player |
|---|---|---|---|
| 39 | DF | ENG | Stephen Darby |
| 40 | GK | ENG | David Martin |
| 46 | DF | ENG | Jack Hobbs |
| — | GK | ENG | Josh Mimms |
| — | DF | ENG | Danny O'Donnell (on loan to Crewe Alexandra) |
| — | DF | ENG | Robbie Threlfall |
| — | DF | ESP | Godwin Antwi (Note: Antwi was born in Kumasi, Ghana, but was raised in Spain from the age of 14 and represented them at U-19 level.) (on loan to Accrington Stanley) |
| — | DF | PAR | Ronald Huth |
| — | MF | ENG | Paul Anderson |
| — | MF | ENG | Charlie Barnett |
| — | MF | ENG | Michael Burns |
| — | MF | ENG | Adam Hammill (on loan to Dunfermline Athletic) |
| — | MF | ENG | Sean Highdale |
| — | MF | ENG | Steven Irwin |

| No. | Pos. | Nation | Player |
|---|---|---|---|
| — | MF | ENG | Craig Lindfield |
| — | MF | ENG | David Mannix (released) |
| — | MF | ENG | Ben Parsonage |
| — | MF | ENG | Ray Putterill |
| — | MF | ENG | Jon Routledge |
| — | MF | ENG | Jimmy Ryan |
| — | MF | ENG | Jay Spearing |
| — | MF | SCO | Ryan Flynn |
| — | MF | ESP | Francisco Durán |
| — | FW | ENG | Lee Woodward |
| — | MF | ALB | Astrit Ajdarević (Note: Ajdarević was born in Pristina, Yugoslavia (now part of Kosovo, but part of Serbia during the 2006–07 season), but was raised in Sweden from the age of 2 and represented them at U-17, U-19, U-21, and U-23 level. He also qualified to represent Albania internationally through his parents and would make his international debut for Albania in November 2017.) |
| — | FW | NED | Jordy Brouwer |
| — | FW | AUT | Besian Idrizaj |
| — | MF | ENG | Seb Carmichal-Brown (Trial) |
| — | FW | CHA | Ali Ounghourra |

== Transfers ==
=== In ===
| # | Player | From | Fee | When |
|---|---|---|---|---|
| 17 | (Wales) Craig Bellamy | (England) Blackburn Rovers | £6,000,000 | 22 June 2006 |
| 29 | (Argentina) Gabriel Paletta | (Argentina) Club Atlético Banfield | £2,000,000 | 5 July 2006 |
| 12 | (Brazil) Fábio Aurélio | (Spain) Valencia | Free | 5 July 2006 |
| 16 | (England) Jermaine Pennant | (England) Birmingham City | £6,700,000 | 26 July 2006 |
| 18 | (Netherlands) Dirk Kuyt | (Netherlands) Feyenoord | £9,000,000 | Summer |
| 42 | (Morocco) Nabil El Zhar | (France) Saint-Étienne | £200,000 | Summer |
| | (Albania) Astrit Ajdarević | (Sweden) Falkenberg | £750,000 | Winter |
| | (Netherlands) Jordy Brouwer | (Netherlands) Ajax | Undisclosed | 24 January 2007 |
| | (Spain) Francisco Durán | (Spain) Málaga | £66,000 | 31 January 2007 |
| 2 | (Spain) Álvaro Arbeloa | (Spain) Deportivo La Coruña | £2,500,000 | 31 January 2007 |

=== Out ===
| # | Player | To | Fee | When |
|---|---|---|---|---|
| 37 | (United States) Zak Whitbread | (England) Millwall | £200,000 | Summer |
| 28 | (France) Bruno Cheyrou | (France) Rennes | Undisclosed | 30 June 2006 |
| 42 | (Scotland) Robbie Foy | (England) Scunthorpe United | Free | 23 August 2006 |
| 31 | (England) David Raven | (England) Carlisle United | Undisclosed | Summer |
| 19 | (Spain) Fernando Morientes | (Spain) Valencia | £3,000,000 | 5 July 2006 |
| 16 | (Germany) Dietmar Hamann | (England) Bolton Wanderers | Free | 11 July 2006 |
| 22 | (England) Chris Kirkland | (England) Wigan Athletic | Six-month loan | 11 July 2006 |
| 36 | (Spain) Antonio Barragán | (Spain) Deportivo La Coruña | £680,000 | 4 August 2006 |
| 21 | (Mali) Djimi Traoré | (England) Charlton Athletic | £2,000,000 | 8 August 2006 |
| 35 | (Algeria) Carl Medjani | (France) Lorient | Free | Summer |
| 33 | (England) Neil Mellor | (England) Preston North End | £500,000 | 30 August 2006 |
| 2 | (Netherlands) Jan Kromkamp | (Netherlands) PSV Eindhoven | £1,750,000 | 31 August 2006 |
| 24 | (France) Florent Sinama Pongolle | (Spain) Recreativo de Huelva | £2,700,000 | 31 August 2006 |
| 15 | (Senegal) Salif Diao | (England) Stoke City | Free | 10 October 2006 |
| 22 | (England) Chris Kirkland | (England) Wigan Athletic | £3,500,000 | 27 October 2006 |
| 34 | (Republic of Ireland) Darren Potter | (England) Wolverhampton Wanderers | £525,000 | Winter |
| 28 | (England) Stephen Warnock | (England) Blackburn Rovers | £1,500,000 | 22 January 2007 |

=== In on loan ===
| # | Player | From | Fee | When |
|---|---|---|---|---|
| 30 | (Italy) Daniele Padelli | (Italy) Sampdoria | Six-month loan | 10 January 2007 |
| 20 | (Argentina) Javier Mascherano | (England) West Ham United | Loan | February |

- In: ▲£16,400,000+
- Out: ▼£27,216,000+
- Total spending: ▼£10,816,000

== Season summary ==
=== August ===
Liverpool began the season in the third qualifying round of the Champions League, beating Israel's Maccabi Haifa on a 3–2 aggregate score, in a 2–1 win at Anfield. The season started well for Craig Bellamy, a new signing from Blackburn Rovers, and Mark González, who returned from a loan spell at Real Sociedad: both made their debuts against Haifa, and both scored. Peter Crouch helped finish the operation in Kyiv (the match was not played in Haifa due to security concerns). Liverpool also won the Community Shield as goals from Crouch and John Arne Riise helped them beat Chelsea 2–1 at the Millennium Stadium.

Liverpool's Premier League campaign began with a 1–1 draw at Bramall Lane against newly promoted Sheffield United. Their first league win of the season came at home against West Ham United, a 2–1 win secured by goals from Crouch and Daniel Agger.

=== September ===
Liverpool lost the Merseyside derby 3–0 at Goodison Park when Everton's Tim Cahill and Andrew Johnson scored once and twice respectively. In the opening match of the group stage of the Champions League the Reds drew 0–0 with PSV in Eindhoven. This was followed by a 1–0 loss away to Chelsea and two home wins against Newcastle United (2–0) and Tottenham Hotspur (3–0). The Newcastle game was especially notable for a long-range goal scored by Xabi Alonso from inside the Liverpool half. They also beat Galatasaray 3–2 at Anfield. Their last game of September ended in a 2–0 defeat away to Bolton Wanderers.

=== October ===
Liverpool's next league match was a 1–1 home draw with Blackburn Rovers, a game where Craig Bellamy scored his first league goal for the club against his previous team. In the Champions League Liverpool beat Bordeaux 1–0 in France but lost a crucial derby match against Manchester United 2–0 at Old Trafford just four days later. after. They then faced Bordeaux at Anfield, a match they won 3–0 thanks to Luis García (2) and Steven Gerrard, the captain's first goal of the season. They also progressed in the League Cup after a 4–3 win over Reading, and beat Aston Villa 3–1 in the league, ending the away side's run of nine unbeaten matches from the beginning of the campaign.

=== November ===
November started well with a 2–0 win over Reading in the Premier League and a League Cup victory (1–0) against Birmingham City. They beat PSV 2–0 in the Champions League.

=== December ===
Liverpool started December with a 4–0 win against Wigan Athletic, their first away victory of the campaign. They achieved a second consecutive Premier League 4–0 against Fulham after a disappointing 3–2 defeat by Galatasaray in the Champions League. This was followed by two further wins with Charlton Athletic, beaten 3–0 at The Valley, and Watford, defeated 2–0 at Anfield. However, Liverpool lost their next match 1–0 away to Blackburn Rovers before ending the year with a 1–0 win at Tottenham Hotspur.

=== January ===
In the first week of January, Liverpool faced Arsenal twice, both at Anfield, once in the FA Cup and once in the League Cup. Both times, the Gunners came away with victory, 3–1 and 6–3 respectively. However, Liverpool beat both Bolton Wanderers and Watford 3–0 either side of the Arsenal games. They also beat Chelsea 2–0 at Anfield on Petr Čech's first match back after his horrific head injury.

=== February ===
Liverpool drew 0–0 in the Merseyside derby at Anfield. They knocked Barcelona out of the Champions League in the round of 16 on away goals after Craig Bellamy and John Arne Riise put two past Víctor Valdés at the Camp Nou.

=== March ===
In between the Barça games, Liverpool beat Sheffield United 4–0, with Robbie Fowler scoring twice from the penalty spot, which proved to be his last goals for the club. However, they lost 1–0 to local rivals Manchester United courtesy to an injury time winner by United substitute John O'Shea. Liverpool then drew 0–0 with Aston Villa at Villa Park, before beating Arsenal 4–1 at Anfield, Peter Crouch scoring a hat trick with Daniel Agger scoring the other.

=== April ===
Liverpool comfortably put PSV out of the Champions League in the quarter-finals, winning 4–0 on aggregate. A 3–0 victory in Eindhoven was followed by a 1–0 win in the return leg at Anfield. In between the two matches they travelled to Reading, a game which they won 2–1. The next three league games yielded a 0–0 draw away to Manchester City and two home wins against Middlesbrough and Wigan Athletic, both games ending 2–0. They lost 1–0 to Chelsea in the first leg of the Champions League semi-final after a goal by Joe Cole. Ahead of the second leg against the London side, a much-changed Liverpool team lost 2–1 away to Portsmouth.

=== May ===
Liverpool reached their second Champions League final in three years after beating Chelsea on penalties following a 1–0 win at Anfield. In the final, they faced AC Milan, their 2005 adversaries; Milan exacted their revenge, winning 2–1 with two goals from Filippo Inzaghi. Dirk Kuyt replied for the Reds but it was not enough to stop Milan.

== Results ==
=== Pre-season ===
Friendlies
| Kick Off | Opponents | H/A | Result | Scorers | Referee | Attendance |
|---|---|---|---|---|---|---|
| 2006-07-15 15:00 | (Wales) Wrexham | A | 2 – 0 | Anderson 5', Bellamy 52' | (England) Mike Jones | 11,335 |
| 2006-07-22 15:00 | (England) Crewe Alexandra | A | 1 – 0 | Lindfield 18' | (England) Tony Bates | 10,101 |
| 2006-07-29 16:30 | (Germany) Kaiserslautern | N | 2 – 3 | Bellamy 60', L.García 67' | | 2,800 |
| 2006-08-01 16:00 | (Switzerland) Grasshopper Zürich | A | 0 – 2 | | (Switzerland) Rene Rogalla | 5,500 |
| 2006-08-04 19:30 | (Germany) Mainz | A | 0 – 5 | | (Germany) Jochen Drees | |

FA Community Shield
| Kick Off | Opponents | H/A | Result | Scorers | Referee | Attendance |
|---|---|---|---|---|---|---|
| 2006-08-13 15:00 | (England) Chelsea | N | 2 – 1 | Riise 9', Crouch 80' | (England) Martin Atkinson | 56,275 |

=== Premier League ===
| 19 August 2006 1 | Sheffield United | 1–1 | Liverpool | Sheffield |
| 12:45 | Morgan (yellow card) 37'; Hulse 46' | Report | Sissoko (yellow card) 64'; Fowler 70' (pen.); Kromkamp (yellow card) 82' | Stadium: Bramall Lane; Attendance: 31,726; Referee: Rob Styles |

| 26 August 2006 2 | Liverpool | 2–1 | West Ham United | Liverpool |
| 12:45 | Agger 42'; Crouch 45' | Report | Zamora 12' | Stadium: Anfield; Attendance: 43,965; Referee: Alan Wiley |

| 9 September 2006 3 | Everton | 3–0 | Liverpool | Liverpool |
| 12:45 | Cahill 24'; Yobo (yellow card) 34'; A. Johnson 36', 90+4' | Report | Sissoko (yellow card) 75'; Riise (yellow card) 79'; Hyypiä (yellow card) 90+2' | Stadium: Goodison Park; Attendance: 40,004; Referee: Graham Poll |

| 17 September 2006 4 | Chelsea | 1–0 | Liverpool | London |
| 13:30 | Drogba 42'; Ballack (red card) 51' | Report | | Stadium: Stamford Bridge; Attendance: 41,882; Referee: Mike Riley |

| 20 September 2006 5 | Liverpool | 2–0 | Newcastle United | Liverpool |
| 20:00 | Kuyt 29'; Alonso 79' | Report | | Stadium: Anfield; Attendance: 43,754; Referee: Mark Halsey |

| 23 September 2006 6 | Liverpool | 3–0 | Tottenham Hotspur | Liverpool |
| 12:45 | González 63'; Kuyt 73'; Riise 89' | Report | | Stadium: Anfield; Attendance: 44,330; Referee: Howard Webb |

| 30 September 2006 7 | Bolton Wanderers | 2–0 | Liverpool | Bolton |
| 12:45 | Speed 30'; Campo 51' | Report | | Stadium: Reebok Stadium; Attendance: 25,061; Referee: Phil Dowd |

| 14 October 2006 8 | Liverpool | 1–1 | Blackburn Rovers | Liverpool |
| 15:00 | Bellamy 64' | Report | McCarthy 17' | Stadium: Anfield; Attendance: 44,206; Referee: Mark Clattenburg |

| 22 October 2006 9 | Manchester United | 2–0 | Liverpool | Manchester |
| 13:00 | Scholes 39'; Ferdinand 66'; Vidić (yellow card) 69' | Report | Sissoko (yellow card) 27'; Finnan (yellow card) 76'; Crouch (yellow card) 77' | Stadium: Old Trafford; Attendance: 75,828; Referee: Graham Poll |

| 28 October 2006 10 | Liverpool | 3–1 | Aston Villa | Liverpool |
| 15:00 | Kuyt 31'; Crouch 38'; García 44' | Report | Mellberg (yellow card) 31'; Agbonlahor 66' | Stadium: Anfield; Attendance: 44,117; Referee: Steve Bennett |

| 4 November 2006 11 | Liverpool | 2–0 | Reading | Liverpool |
| 15:00 | Kuyt 14', 73' | Report | | Stadium: Anfield; Attendance: 43,741; Referee: Uriah Rennie |

| 12 November 2006 12 | Arsenal | 3–0 | Liverpool | London |
| 16:00 | Flamini 41'; Touré 56'; Gallas 80' | Report | | Stadium: Emirates Stadium; Attendance: 60,110; Referee: Mark Clattenburg |

| 18 November 2006 13 | Middlesbrough | 0–0 | Liverpool | Middlesbrough |
| 17:15 | | Report | | Stadium: Riverside; Attendance: 31,424; Referee: Lee Mason |

| 25 November 2006 14 | Liverpool | 1–0 | Manchester City | Liverpool |
| 15:00 | Gerrard 67' | Report | | Stadium: Anfield; Attendance: 44,081; Referee: Rob Styles |

| 29 November 2006 15 | Liverpool | 0–0 | Portsmouth | Liverpool |
| 20:00 | | Report | | Stadium: Anfield; Attendance: 42,467; Referee: Alan Wiley |

| 2 December 2006 16 | Wigan Athletic | 0–4 | Liverpool | Wigan |
| 15:00 | | Report | Bellamy 9', 26'; Kuyt 40'; McCulloch 45' (o.g.) | Stadium: JJB Stadium; Attendance: 22,089; Referee: Mike Riley |

| 9 December 2006 17 | Liverpool | 4–0 | Fulham | Liverpool |
| 15:00 | Gerrard 54'; Carragher 61'; García 66'; González 90' | Report | | Stadium: Anfield; Attendance: 43,189; Referee: Uriah Rennie |

| 16 December 2006 18 | Charlton Athletic | 0–3 | Liverpool | London |
| 12:45 | | Report | Alonso 3' (pen.); Bellamy 82'; Gerrard 88' | Stadium: The Valley; Attendance: 27,111; Referee: Howard Webb |

| 23 December 2006 19 | Liverpool | 2–0 | Watford | Liverpool |
| 15:00 | Bellamy 47'; Alonso 88' | (Report) | | Stadium: Anfield; Attendance: 42,807; Referee: Phil Dowd |

| 26 December 2006 20 | Blackburn Rovers | 1–0 | Liverpool | Blackburn |
| 15:00 | McCarthy 49' | Report | | Stadium: Ewood Park; Attendance: 29,342; Referee: Rob Styles |

| 30 December 2006 21 | Tottenham Hotspur | 0–1 | Liverpool | London |
| 15:00 | | Report | García 45' | Stadium: White Hart Lane; Attendance: 36,170; Referee: Mark Halsey |

| 1 January 2007 22 | Liverpool | 3–0 | Bolton Wanderers | Liverpool |
| 12:45 | Crouch 61'; Gerrard 63'; Kuyt 83' | Report | | Stadium: Anfield; Attendance: 41,370; Referee: Graham Poll |

| 13 January 2007 23 | Watford | 0–3 | Liverpool | Watford |
| 12:45 | | Report | Bellamy 34'; Crouch 40', 48' | Stadium: Vicarage Road; Attendance: 19,746; Referee: Mark Clattenburg |

| 20 January 2007 24 | Liverpool | 2–0 | Chelsea | Liverpool |
| 12:45 | Kuyt 4'; Pennant 18' | Report | Ferreira (yellow card) 70' | Stadium: Anfield; Attendance: 44,245; Referee: Rob Styles |

| 30 January 2007 25 | West Ham United | 1–2 | Liverpool | London |
| 19:45 | Blanco 77' | Report | Kuyt 46'; Crouch 53' | Stadium: Boleyn Ground; Attendance: 34,966; Referee: Martin Atkinson |

| 3 February 2007 26 | Liverpool | 0–0 | Everton | Liverpool |
| 12:45 | | Report | | Stadium: Anfield; Attendance: 44,234; Referee: Alan Wiley |

| 10 February 2007 27 | Newcastle United | 2–1 | Liverpool | Newcastle-upon-Tyne |
| 15:00 | Martins 26'; Solano 70' | Report | Bellamy 6' | Stadium: St. James' Park; Attendance: 52,305; Referee: Mark Halsey |

| 24 February 2007 28 | Liverpool | 4–0 | Sheffield United | Liverpool |
| 15:00 | Fowler 20' (pen.), 25' (pen.); Hyypiä 70'; Gerrard 73' | Report | | Stadium: Anfield; Attendance: 44,198; Referee: Steve Bennett |

| 3 March 2007 29 | Liverpool | 0–1 | Manchester United | Liverpool |
| 12:45 | Alonso (yellow card) 41'; Carragher (yellow card) 72' | Report | Carrick (yellow card) 43'; Neville (yellow card) 81'; Scholes (red card) 86'; O'Shea 90' | Stadium: Anfield; Attendance: 44,403; Referee: Martin Atkinson |

| 18 March 2007 30 | Aston Villa | 0–0 | Liverpool | Birmingham |
| 13:35 | | Report | | Stadium: Villa Park; Attendance: 42,551; Referee: Lee Mason |

| 31 March 2007 31 | Liverpool | 4–1 | Arsenal | Liverpool |
| 12:45 | Crouch 4', 35', 81'; Agger 60' | Report | Gallas 73' | Stadium: Anfield; Attendance: 43,958; Referee: Steve Benett |

| 7 April 2007 32 | Reading | 1–2 | Liverpool | Reading |
| 15:00 | Gunnarsson 47' | Report | Arbeloa 15'; Kuyt 86' | Stadium: Madejski Stadium; Attendance: 24,121; Referee: Peter Walton |

| 14 April 2007 33 | Manchester City | 0–0 | Liverpool | Manchester |
| 15:00 | | Report | | Stadium: City of Manchester Stadium; Attendance: 45,883; Referee: Uriah Rennie |

| 18 April 2007 34 | Liverpool | 2–0 | Middlesbrough | Liverpool |
| 20:00 | Gerrard 58', 65' (pen.) | Report | | Stadium: Anfield; Attendance: 41,458; Referee: Graham Poll |

| 21 April 2007 35 | Liverpool | 2–0 | Wigan Athletic | Liverpool |
| 15:00 | Kuyt 30', 68' | Report | | Stadium: Anfield; Attendance: 44,003; Referee: Mike Riley |

| 28 April 2007 36 | Portsmouth | 2–1 | Liverpool | Portsmouth |
| 15:00 | Benjani 27'; Kranjčar 32' | Report | Hyypiä 59' | Stadium: Fratton Park; Attendance: 20,201; Referee: Peter Walton |

| 5 May 2007 37 | Fulham | 1–0 | Liverpool | London |
| 15:00 | Dempsey 69' | Report | | Stadium: Craven Cottage; Attendance: 24,554; Referee: Steve Bennett |

| 13 May 2007 38 | Liverpool | 2–2 | Charlton Athletic | Liverpool |
| 15:00 | Alonso 62'; Kewell 90' (pen.) | Report | Holland 2'; D. Bent 72' | Stadium: Anfield; Attendance: 43,134; Referee: Dermot Gallagher |

==== Premier League results by round ====
| Round | 1 | 2 | 3 | 4 | 5 | 6 | 7 | 8 | 9 | 10 | 11 | 12 | 13 | 14 | 15 | 16 | 17 | 18 | 19 | 20 | 21 | 22 | 23 | 24 | 25 | 26 | 27 | 28 | 29 | 30 | 31 | 32 | 33 | 34 | 35 | 36 | 37 | 38 |
|---|---|---|---|---|---|---|---|---|---|---|---|---|---|---|---|---|---|---|---|---|---|---|---|---|---|---|---|---|---|---|---|---|---|---|---|---|---|---|
| Ground | A | H | A | A | H | H | A | H | A | H | H | A | A | H | H | A | H | A | H | A | A | H | A | H | A | H | A | H | H | A | H | A | A | H | H | A | A | H |
| Result | D | W | L | L | W | W | L | D | L | W | W | L | D | W | D | W | W | W | W | L | W | W | W | W | W | D | L | W | L | D | W | W | D | W | W | L | L | D |
| Position | 9 | 4 | 3 | 7 | 10 | 8 | 10 | 11 | 11 | 8 | 8 | 9 | 10 | 9 | 7 | 5 | 5 | 3 | 3 | 6 | 4 | 3 | 3 | 3 | 3 | 3 | 4 | 4 | 4 | 4 | 4 | 3 | 3 | 3 | 3 | 3 | 3 | 3 |

Source: Results
A = Away; H = Home; W = Win; D = Draw; L = Loss

==== Classification ====
| Pos | Team | Pld | W | D | L | GF | GA | GD | Pts | Qualification or relegation |
|---|---|---|---|---|---|---|---|---|---|---|
| 1 | Manchester United (C) | 38 | 28 | 5 | 5 | 83 | 27 | +56 | 89 | Qualification for the Champions League group stage |
| 2 | Chelsea | 38 | 24 | 11 | 3 | 64 | 24 | +40 | 83 | Qualification for the Champions League group stage |
| 3 | Liverpool | 38 | 20 | 8 | 10 | 57 | 27 | +30 | 68 | Qualification for the Champions League third qualifying round |
| 4 | Arsenal | 38 | 19 | 11 | 8 | 63 | 35 | +28 | 68 | Qualification for the Champions League third qualifying round |
| 5 | Tottenham Hotspur | 38 | 17 | 9 | 12 | 57 | 54 | +3 | 60 | Qualification for the UEFA Cup first round (Note: Since both finalists of the FA Cup (Manchester United and Chelsea) and the League Cup winners (Chelsea) were qualified for the Champions League, their UEFA Cup spots were given to the 6th- and 7th-placed Premier League teams.) |

Source: Barclays Premier League
Rules for classification: 1) points; 2) goal difference; 3) number of goals scored.
(C) Champions

==== Results summary ====
| Overall | | | | | | | | Home | | | | | | Away | | | | | |
| Pld | W | D | L | GF | GA | GD | Pts | W | D | L | GF | GA | GD | W | D | L | GF | GA | GD |
|---|---|---|---|---|---|---|---|---|---|---|---|---|---|---|---|---|---|---|---|
| 38 | 20 | 8 | 10 | 57 | 27 | +30 | 68 | 14 | 4 | 1 | 39 | 7 | +32 | 6 | 4 | 9 | 18 | 20 | −2 |

=== Champions League ===
==== Third Qualifying Round ====
| 9 August 2006 First leg | Liverpool (England) | 2-1 | (Israel) Maccabi Haifa | Liverpool, England |
| 20:05 CET (UTC+1) | Bellamy 33'; González 88' | Report | Boccoli 29' | Stadium: Anfield; Attendance: 40,058; Referee: Wolfgang Stark (Germany) |

| 22 August 2006 Second leg | Maccabi Haifa (Israel) | 1-1 | (England) Liverpool | Haifa, Israel |
| 19:35 CET (UTC+1) | Colautti 63' | Report | Crouch 54' | Stadium: Sammy Ofer Stadium; Attendance: 12,500; Referee: Roberto Rosetti (Italy) |

==== Group Stage ====
| Pos | Team | Pld | W | D | L | GF | GA | GD | Pts | Qualification | LIV | PSV | BOR | GAL |
|---|---|---|---|---|---|---|---|---|---|---|---|---|---|---|
| 1 | (England) Liverpool | 6 | 4 | 1 | 1 | 11 | 5 | +6 | 13 | Advance to knockout stage | — | 2–0 | 3–0 | 3–2 |
| 2 | (Netherlands) PSV Eindhoven | 6 | 3 | 1 | 2 | 6 | 6 | 0 | 10 | Advance to knockout stage | 0–0 | — | 1–3 | 2–0 |
| 3 | (France) Bordeaux | 6 | 2 | 1 | 3 | 6 | 7 | −1 | 7 | Transfer to UEFA Cup | 0–1 | 0–1 | — | 3–1 |
| 4 | (Turkey) Galatasaray | 6 | 1 | 1 | 4 | 7 | 12 | −5 | 4 | | 3–2 | 1–2 | 0–0 | — |

Source: RSSSF

| 12 September 2006 1 | PSV Eindhoven (Netherlands) | 0–0 | (England) Liverpool | Eindhoven, Netherlands |
| 20:45 CET (UTC+1) | | Report | | Stadium: Philips Stadion; Attendance: 35,000; Referee: Massimo Busacca (Switzerland) |

| 27 September 2006 2 | Liverpool (England) | 3-2 | (Turkey) Galatasaray | Liverpool, England |
| 20:45 CET (UTC+1) | Crouch 9', 52'; García 14' | Report | Ümit Karan 59', 65' | Stadium: Anfield; Attendance: 41,976; Referee: Luis Medina Cantalejo (Spain) |

| 18 October 2006 3 | Bordeaux (France) | 0–1 | (England) Liverpool | Gironde, France |
| 20:45 CET (UTC+1) | | Report | Crouch 58' | Stadium: Matmut Atlantique; Attendance: 31,471; Referee: Tom Henning Øvrebø (Switzerland) |

| 31 October 2006 4 | Liverpool (England) | 3-0 | (France) Bordeaux | Liverpool, England |
| 20:45 CET (UTC+1) | García 23', 76'; Gerrard 71' | Report | | Stadium: Anfield; Attendance: 41,978; Referee: Markus Merk (Spain) |

| 22 November 2006 5 | Liverpool (England) | 2-0 | (Netherlands) PSV Eindhoven | Liverpool, England |
| 20:45 CET (UTC+1) | Gerrard 65'; Crouch 89' | Report | | Stadium: Anfield; Attendance: 41,948; Referee: Domenico Messina (Italy) |

| 5 December 2006 6 | Galatasaray (Turkey) | 3-2 | (England) Liverpool | Istanbul, Turkey |
| 20:45 CET (UTC+1) | Necati 24'; Okan Buruk 28'; Ilić 79' | Report | Fowler 22', 90' | Stadium: Atatürk Olympic Stadium; Attendance: 23,000; Referee: Olegário Benquerença (Portugal) |

==== Knockout Stage ====
| Kick Off | Opponents | H/A | Result | Scorers | Referee | Attendance |
|---|---|---|---|---|---|---|
| 2007-02-21, 20:45 | (Spain) Barcelona | A | 2–1 | Bellamy 43', Riise 74' | (Greece) Kyros Vassaras | 88,000 |
| 2007-03-06, 20:45 | (Spain) Barcelona | H | 0–1 | | (Germany) Herbert Fandel | 45,000 |
| 2007-04-03, 20:45 | (Netherlands) PSV Eindhoven | A | 3–0 | Gerrard 27', Riise 49', Crouch 63' | (France) Bertrand Layec | 36,500 |
| 2007-04-11, 20:45 | (Netherlands) PSV Eindhoven | H | 1–0 | Crouch 67' | (Italy) Roberto Rosetti | 41,447 |
| 2007-04-25, 20:45 | (England) Chelsea | A | 0–1 | | (Germany) Markus Merk | 39,483 |
| 2007-05-01, 20:45 | (England) Chelsea | H | 1–0 (4–1 p) | Agger 22'; Pen: Zenden (penalty scored); Alonso (penalty scored); Gerrard (penalty scored); Kuyt (penalty scored) | (Spain) Manuel Mejuto González | 42,554 |

==== Final ====
| Kick-off | Opponents | H/A | Result | Scorers | Referee | Attendance |
|---|---|---|---|---|---|---|
| 2007-05-23, 20:45 | (Italy) Milan | N | 1–2 | Kuyt 89' | (Germany) Herbert Fandel | 74,000 |

=== FA Cup ===
| Kick-off | Round | Opponent | H/A | Result | Scorers | Referee | Attendance |
|---|---|---|---|---|---|---|---|
| 2007-01-06 | Third round | Arsenal | H | 1–3 | Kuyt 71' | Steve Bennett | 43,619 |

=== League Cup ===
| Kick-off | Round | Opponent | H/A | Result | Scorers | Referee | Attendance |
|---|---|---|---|---|---|---|---|
| 2006-10-25, 20:00 | Third round | Reading | H | 4–3 | Fowler 44', Riise 45', Paletta 49', Crouch 76' | Peter Walton | 42,445 |
| 2006-11-08, 19:45 | Fourth round | Birmingham City | A | 1–0 | Agger 45' | Howard Webb | 23,061 |
| 2007-01-09, | Fifth round | Arsenal | H | 3–6 | Fowler 33', Gerrard 68', Hyypiä 80' | Martin Atkinson | 42,614 |

== Statistics ==
=== Appearances ===
As of 25 May 2007

| No. | Pos | Nat | Player | Total | | Premier League | | Domestic cups | | Champions League | |
| No. | Pos | Nat | Player | Apps | Goals | Apps | Goals | Apps | Goals | Apps | Goals |
|---|---|---|---|---|---|---|---|---|---|---|---|
| 1 | GK | (Poland) POL | Jerzy Dudek | 6 | 0 | 2 | 0 | 3 | 0 | 1 | 0 |
| 2 | DF | (Spain) ESP | Álvaro Arbeloa | 14 | 1 | 8+1 | 1 | 0 | 0 | 4+1 | 0 |
| 2 | DF | (Netherlands) NED | Jan Kromkamp | 1 | 0 | 1 | 0 | 0 | 0 | 0 | 0 |
| 3 | DF | (Republic of Ireland) IRL | Steve Finnan | 47 | 0 | 32+1 | 0 | 2 | 0 | 12 | 0 |
| 4 | DF | (Finland) FIN | Sami Hyypiä | 29 | 3 | 23 | 2 | 1 | 1 | 5 | 0 |
| 5 | DF | (Denmark) DEN | Daniel Agger | 43 | 4 | 23+4 | 2 | 4 | 1 | 12 | 1 |
| 6 | DF | (Norway) NOR | John Arne Riise | 48 | 5 | 29+4 | 1 | 3 | 2 | 12 | 2 |
| 7 | MF | (Australia) AUS | Harry Kewell | 3 | 1 | 0+2 | 1 | 0 | 0 | 0+1 | 0 |
| 8 | MF | (England) ENG | Steven Gerrard | 51 | 11 | 35+1 | 7 | 2+1 | 1 | 10+2 | 3 |
| 9 | FW | (England) ENG | Robbie Fowler | 23 | 7 | 6+10 | 3 | 3 | 2 | 1+3 | 2 |
| 10 | FW | (Spain) ESP | Luis García | 27 | 6 | 11+6 | 3 | 2+1 | 0 | 4+3 | 3 |
| 11 | MF | (Chile) CHI | Mark González | 36 | 3 | 14+11 | 2 | 3 | 0 | 3+5 | 1 |
| 12 | DF | (Brazil) BRA | Fábio Aurélio | 25 | 0 | 10+7 | 0 | 1+2 | 0 | 3+2 | 0 |
| 14 | MF | (Spain) ESP | Xabi Alonso | 51 | 4 | 29+3 | 4 | 1+3 | 0 | 13+2 | 0 |
| 15 | FW | (England) ENG | Peter Crouch | 49 | 18 | 19+13 | 9 | 3 | 2 | 8+6 | 7 |
| 16 | MF | (England) ENG | Jermaine Pennant | 52 | 1 | 20+14 | 1 | 4 | 0 | 9+5 | 0 |
| 17 | FW | (Wales) WAL | Craig Bellamy | 42 | 9 | 23+4 | 7 | 2+1 | 0 | 8+4 | 2 |
| 18 | FW | (Netherlands) NED | Dirk Kuyt | 48 | 14 | 27+7 | 12 | 1+2 | 1 | 10+1 | 1 |
| 20 | MF | (Argentina) ARG | Javier Mascherano | 11 | 0 | 7 | 0 | 0 | 0 | 4 | 0 |
| 22 | MF | (Mali) MLI | Mohamed Sissoko | 28 | 0 | 15+1 | 0 | 3 | 0 | 7+2 | 0 |
| 23 | DF | (England) ENG | Jamie Carragher | 51 | 1 | 34+1 | 1 | 2+1 | 0 | 13 | 0 |
| 24 | FW | (France) FRA | Florent Sinama Pongolle | 1 | 0 | 0 | 0 | 0+1 | 0 | 0 | 0 |
| 25 | GK | (Spain) ESP | Pepe Reina | 51 | 0 | 35 | 0 | 2 | 0 | 14 | 0 |
| 28 | DF | (England) ENG | Stephen Warnock | 7 | 0 | 1 | 0 | 3 | 0 | 2+1 | 0 |
| 29 | DF | (Argentina) ARG | Gabriel Paletta | 8 | 1 | 2+1 | 0 | 3 | 1 | 1+1 | 0 |
| 30 | GK | (Italy) ITA | Daniele Padelli | 1 | 0 | 1 | 0 | 0 | 0 | 0 | 0 |
| 32 | MF | (Netherlands) NED | Boudewijn Zenden | 30 | 0 | 9+7 | 0 | 3 | 0 | 7+4 | 0 |
| 34 | DF | (Spain) ESP | Miki Roqué | 1 | 0 | 0 | 0 | 0 | 0 | 0+1 | 0 |
| 35 | MF | (England) ENG | Danny Guthrie | 7 | 0 | 0+3 | 0 | 1+2 | 0 | 1 | 0 |
| 37 | DF | (England) ENG | Lee Peltier | 4 | 0 | 0 | 0 | 3 | 0 | 1 | 0 |
| 42 | MF | (Morocco) MAR | Nabil El Zhar | 3 | 0 | 0+3 | 0 | 0 | 0 | 0 | 0 |
| 45 | DF | (England) ENG | James Smith | 1 | 0 | 0 | 0 | 0+1 | 0 | 0 | 0 |
| 48 | DF | (Argentina) ARG | Emiliano Insúa | 2 | 0 | 2 | 0 | 0 | 0 | 0 | 0 |

=== Top scorers ===
| Rank | Pos. | No. | Player | Premier League | FA Cup | League Cup | Champions League | Community Shield | Total |
|---|---|---|---|---|---|---|---|---|---|
| 1 | FW | 15 | (England) Peter Crouch | 9 | 0 | 1 | 7 | 1 | 18 |
| 2 | FW | 18 | (Netherlands) Dirk Kuyt | 12 | 1 | 0 | 1 | 0 | 14 |
| 3 | MF | 8 | (England) Steven Gerrard | 7 | 0 | 1 | 3 | 0 | 11 |
| 4 | FW | 17 | (Wales) Craig Bellamy | 7 | 0 | 0 | 2 | 0 | 9 |
| 5 | FW | 9 | (England) Robbie Fowler | 3 | 0 | 2 | 2 | 0 | 7 |
| 6 | FW | 10 | (Spain) Luis García | 3 | 0 | 0 | 3 | 0 | 6 |
| 7 | DF | 6 | (Norway) John Arne Riise | 1 | 0 | 1 | 2 | 1 | 5 |
| 8 | DF | 5 | (Denmark) Daniel Agger | 2 | 0 | 1 | 1 | 0 | 4 |
| 8 | MF | 14 | (Spain) Xabi Alonso | 4 | 0 | 0 | 0 | 0 | 4 |
| 10 | DF | 4 | (Finland) Sami Hyypiä | 2 | 0 | 1 | 0 | 0 | 3 |
| 10 | MF | 11 | (Chile) Mark González | 2 | 0 | 0 | 1 | 0 | 3 |
| 12 | DF | 2 | (Spain) Álvaro Arbeloa | 1 | 0 | 0 | 0 | 0 | 1 |
| 12 | MF | 7 | (Australia) Harry Kewell | 1 | 0 | 0 | 0 | 0 | 1 |
| 12 | MF | 16 | (England) Jermaine Pennant | 1 | 0 | 0 | 0 | 0 | 1 |
| 12 | DF | 23 | (England) Jamie Carragher | 1 | 0 | 0 | 0 | 0 | 1 |
| 12 | DF | 29 | (Argentina) Gabriel Paletta | 0 | 0 | 1 | 0 | 0 | 1 |
| Own goals | | | | 1 | 0 | 0 | 0 | 0 | 1 |
| TOTALS | | | | | | 8 | | 2 | 89 |
