= Niccolò Galli =

Niccolò Galli is the name of:

- Niccolò Galli (footballer, born 1983), footballer
- Niccolò Galli (footballer, born 1988), current footballer
