= Daniel Reed =

Dan, Danny or Daniel Reed may refer to:

== Entertainment ==
- Daniel Reed (actor) (1892–1978), American director and screenwriter
- Dan Reed (born 1963), American musician and founder of Dan Reed Network
- Dan Reed (director) (born 1964), British documentary filmmaker (Leaving Neverland)
- Danny Reed, American radio personality since 2000s

== Others ==
- Daniel Reed (Canadian politician) (1858–1935), Liberal in Legislative Assembly of Ontario
- Daniel A. Reed (politician) (1875–1959), American Republican congressman from New York for 40 years
- Daniel A. Reed (computer scientist), American vice president for academic affairs at University of Utah since 2018
- Daniel Reed (table tennis) (born 1989), British medalist at 2014 Commonwealth Games

== See also ==
- Daniel Read (1757–1836), American composer, one of primary figures in early American classical music
- Daniel Read (academic) (1805–1878), American president of University of Missouri
- Daniel G. Reid (1858–1925), American industrialist, financier and philanthropist known as "Tinplate King"
- Dan Reid (born 1944), Canadian physician and politician
