= Stephen Darby =

English footballer (born 1988)

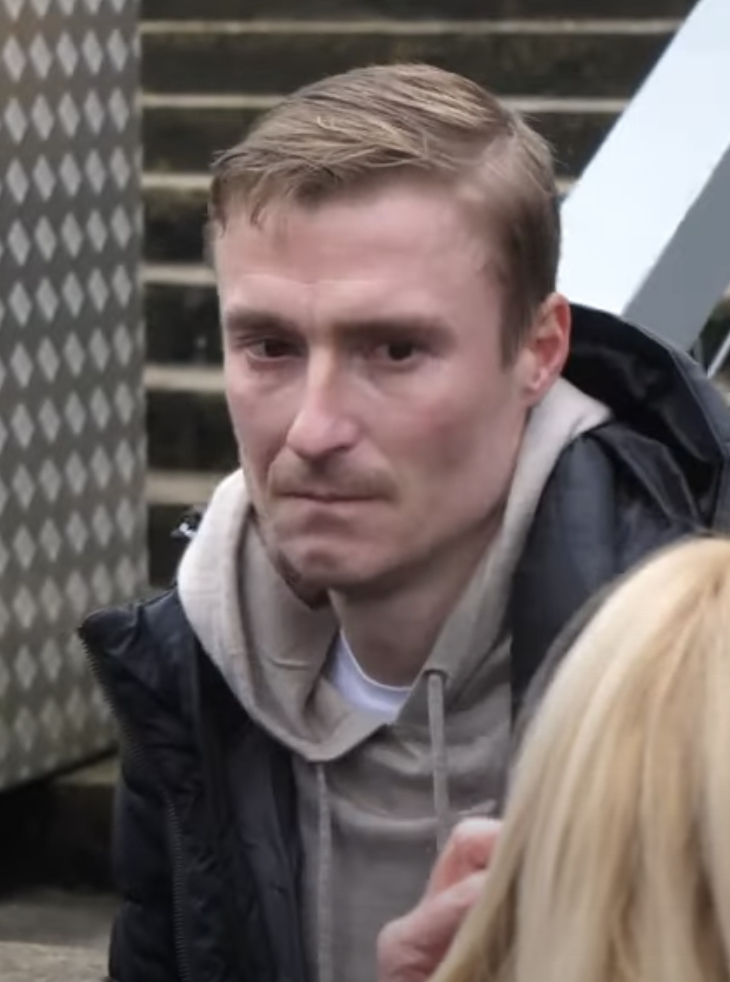
- Darby in 2022

Personal information
- Full name: Stephen Mark Darby
- Date of birth: 6 October 1988 (age 38)
- Place of birth: Liverpool, England
- Height: 6 ft 0 in (1.83 m)
- Position: Right-back

Youth career
- –2008: Liverpool

Senior career*
Years	Team	Apps	(Gls)
2008–2012	Liverpool	1	(0)
2010	→ Swindon Town (loan)	12	(0)
2010–2011	→ Notts County (loan)	22	(0)
2011–2012	→ Rochdale (loan)	35	(0)
2012–2017	Bradford City	194	(0)
2017–2018	Bolton Wanderers	3	(0)
Total		267	(0)

International career
2007–2008	England U19	2	(0)
- * Club domestic league appearances and goals

Stephen Mark Darby (born 6 October 1988) is an English former professional footballer who played as a right-back. Darby represented England at under-19 level. He began his career playing on the winning side of the Liverpool FA Youth Cup in 2006 and played competitively for Liverpool from 2008 to 2012. Darby then joined the Bradford team that reached the 2013 Football League Cup final, making over 200 appearances for the club and captaining the side for two seasons. Although he afterwards signed a two-year contract with Bolton Wanderers in 2017, Darby retired from his career just over a year later at the age of 29 after being diagnosed with motor neurone disease.

== Early life ==
Darby was brought up in Maghull, Merseyside, where he attended St. John Bosco Catholic Primary School and Maricourt Roman Catholic High School.

== Club career ==
=== Liverpool ===
Darby played in Liverpool's FA Youth Cup winning teams in 2006 and 2007 that defeated Manchester City and Manchester United's academies in the finals respectively, captaining the team in the 2006 final. He was first selected for the Liverpool squad which played Turkish side Galatasaray in the group stages of the UEFA Champions League in December 2006, but he was an unused substitute in that match. After a four-hour flight from Istanbul to Liverpool, he went straight to The Hawthorns and played a full game, including extra-time, to help the youth team through to the fourth round.

During the 2007–08 season, Darby captained Liverpool's reserves team that ended the campaign as northern and national champions. His performances earned him praises from manager Gary Ablett calling him 'Mr. Consistency'.

His first appearance in a competitive match was as a substitute in Liverpool's League Cup fourth round defeat against Tottenham Hotspur in November 2008.

He made his Champions League debut against PSV Eindhoven on 9 December 2008, coming on as a substitute alongside fellow homegrown players Jay Spearing and Martin Kelly. On 5 July 2009, Darby secured a three-year extension to his contract along with fellow Melwood graduate Jay Spearing.

He made his first competitive start for Liverpool against ACF Fiorentina in the UEFA Champions League on 9 December 2009 in a 2–1 defeat. His second competitive start came against Reading in the FA Cup. The game finished 1–1. Darby was praised by Liverpool centre-back Jamie Carragher for his performance in the game.

Darby made his Premier League debut against Tottenham Hotspur on 20 January 2010, coming on as a substitute in the 90th minute for Philipp Degen.

He was included in Liverpool's 25-man squad for the 2010–11 Premier League season.

He was released by the club at the end of the 2011–12 season.

==== Swindon Town, Notts County, and Rochdale loans ====
On 11 March 2010, Darby joined Swindon Town on loan for the remainder of the 2009–10 season. He started his first game on 13 March 2010 against Brighton & Hove Albion and played the full 90 minutes at right back. He then took part in the play-off semi-final against Charlton Athletic, where he scored the decisive penalty in the shoot-out.

On 1 November, Notts County manager and ex-Liverpool player Paul Ince snapped up both Darby and Thomas Ince on a loan deal from Liverpool. He made his County debut on 6 November in an FA Cup 1st round match against Gateshead On 13 November, he started in County's 3–1 league defeat to Exeter City. A week later, he started again in the 1–0 home defeat to Tranmere Rovers. On 23 November, he started and was named Man of the Match in the 1–0 win against one of his former clubs, Swindon. Again he started on 11 December, this time in a win as County defeated Milton Keynes Dons at home, 2–0. After his loan spell completed on 3 January 2011 he returned to Liverpool. He rejoined County later in January for the remainder of the season, before returning to Liverpool in early May.

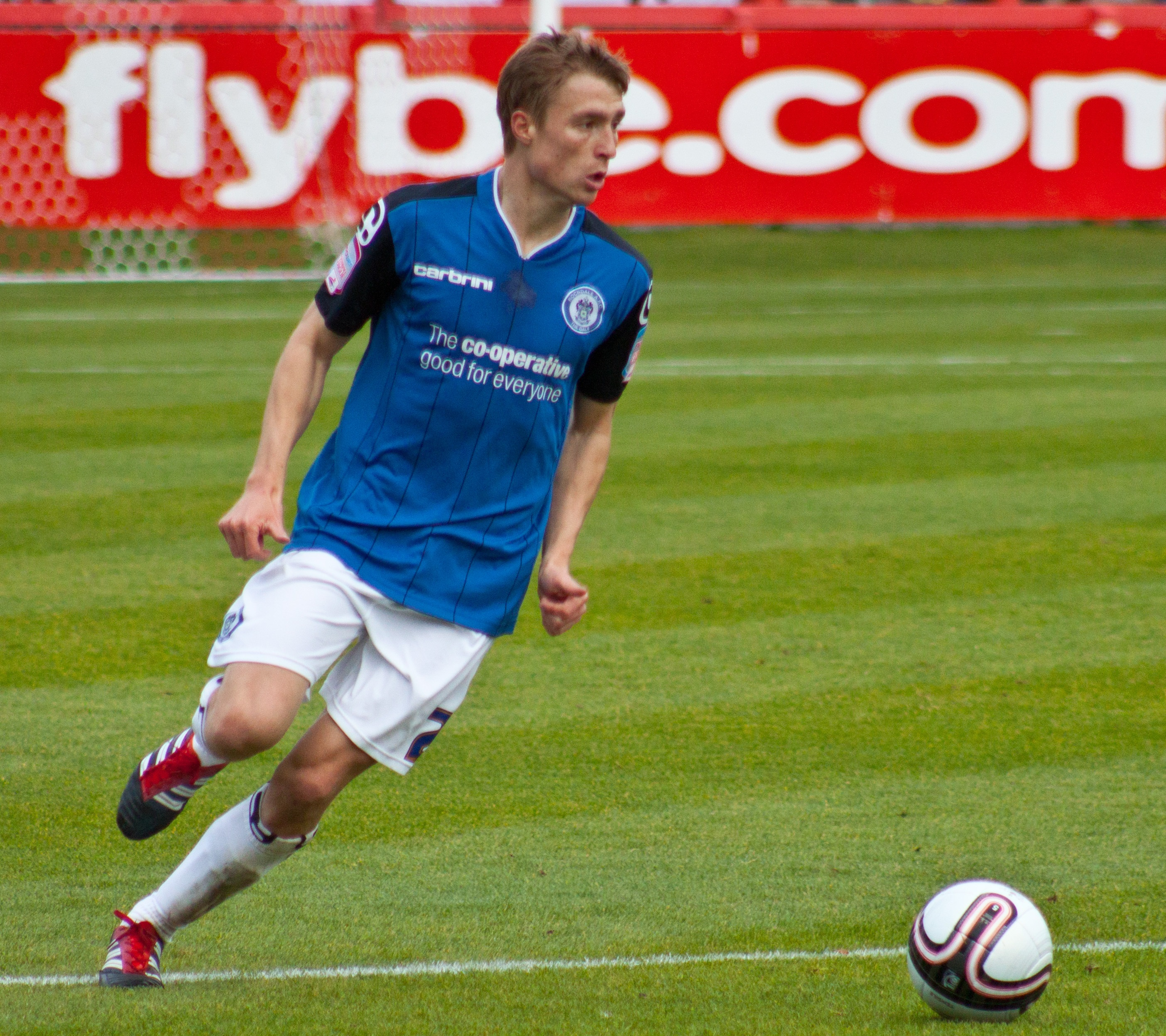
Darby playing for Rochdale in 2011

On 7 July 2011, Rochdale confirmed the signing of Darby on loan for the 2011–12 campaign. He made his debut on 6 August 2011, against Sheffield Wednesday, playing the full 90 minutes in a 2–0 defeat. He was the fans' man of the match in the 0–0 home draw against Carlisle United on 16 August 2011. He made 40 appearances for the club during his season-long loan.

=== Bradford City ===
On 4 July 2012, Darby signed for Bradford City on a two-year contract. He made his debut on 11 August 2012 in a 1–0 League Cup win against Notts County. He made his league debut a week later against Gillingham. He made his home debut on 21 August, coming on as a substitute for Nahki Wells in a 1–0 win against Fleetwood Town. On 25 September, he scored the only goal of his career in the 115th minute of a 3–2 win against Burton Albion in the League Cup third round. Bradford went on to reach the final, beating Premier League sides Wigan Athletic, Arsenal and Aston Villa in subsequent rounds.

Darby won seven awards at the Bradford City end-of-season dinner in May 2014. Darby was made club captain whilst Gary Jones was made team captain, and signed a new three-year contract in June 2014. For the 2016–17 season, Darby was replaced by new signing Romain Vincelot as captain, under new manager Stuart McCall. In May 2017 it was announced that he would be released at the end of the season, when his contract expired.

=== Bolton Wanderers and retirement ===
On 7 July 2017, Darby signed a two-year contract at Bolton Wanderers, reuniting with former manager Phil Parkinson.

On 18 September 2018, Darby announced his retirement from professional football at the age of 29 after being diagnosed with motor neurone disease.

== International career ==
Darby was part of England's squad for UEFA European U19 Championship qualifications in May 2007 and made two appearances alongside Liverpool teammates Jack Hobbs, Craig Lindfield and Adam Hammill.

== Personal life ==
Darby is married to Steph Houghton, former captain of Manchester City Women and former captain of the England women's national team. They married on 21 June 2018.

Darby set up the Darby Rimmer MND Foundation to fund support for families affected by motor neurone disease, and research a cure. In July 2019 two of his former clubs (Liverpool and Bradford City) held a fundraising match. His final club, Bolton Wanderers, played a fund-raising match against a team consisting of legendary Bolton players on 12 November 2021 to help raise money for the recovery of the mother of Gethin Jones, a Bolton player, as she had been diagnosed with motor neurone disease; a quarter of the proceeds went to Darby's charity.

In 2023, Darby along with former Bristol Rovers and Huddersfield Town player Marcus Stewart, another former footballer diagnosed with motor neurone disease, completed a 178 mile charity march from Anfield to Valley Parade in support of people suffering with motor neurone disease with £130,000 being raised from the march. The march was attended by Jamie Redknapp, Paul Scholes and Chloe Kelly, among other attendees.

== Career statistics ==
Appearances and goals by club, season and competition
Club	Season	League			FA Cup		League Cup		Other		Total	
Club	Season	Division	Apps	Goals	Apps	Goals	Apps	Goals	Apps	Goals	Apps	Goals
Liverpool	2008–09	Premier League	0	0	0	0	1	0	2 (Note: Appearances in UEFA Champions League)	0	3	0
Liverpool	2009–10	Premier League	1	0	1	0	0	0	1	0	3	0
Liverpool	2010–11	Premier League	0	0	0	0	0	0	1 (Note: Appearance in Europa League)	0	1	0
Liverpool	Total		1	0	1	0	1	0	4	0	7	0
Swindon Town (loan)	2009–10	League One	14	0	0	0	0	0	1 (Note: Appearances in League One play-offs)	0	15	0
Notts County (loan)	2010–11	League One	22	0	2	0	0	0	0	0	24	0
Rochdale (loan)	2011–12	League One	35	0	0	0	3	0	2 (Note: Appearances in Football League Trophy)	0	40	0
Bradford City	2012–13	League Two	35	0	3	0	8	1	5 (Note: Two appearances in Football League Trophy, three in League Two play-offs)	0	51	1
Bradford City	2013–14	League One	46	0	1	0	1	0	1	0	49	0
Bradford City	2014–15	League One	45	0	8	0	2	0	1	0	56	0
Bradford City	2015–16	League One	46	0	5	0	0	0	3 (Note: One appearance in Football League Trophy, two in League One play-offs)	0	54	0
Bradford City	2016–17	League One	22	0	1	0	0	0	6 (Note: Five appearances in EFL Trophy, one in League One play-offs)	0	29	0
Bradford City	Total		194	0	18	0	11	1	16	0	239	1
Bolton Wanderers	2017–18	Championship	3	0	0	0	2	0	0	0	5	0
Career total			267	0	21	0	17	1	23	0	328	1

== Honours ==
Liverpool Youth

- FA Youth Cup: 2005–06, 2006-07

Bradford City

- Football League Two play-offs: 2013
- Football League Cup runner-up: 2012–13

Individual

- Bradford City Player of the Year: 2013–14
