= Christian Tshimanga Kabeya =

Belgian footballer (born 1987)

Christian Kabeya
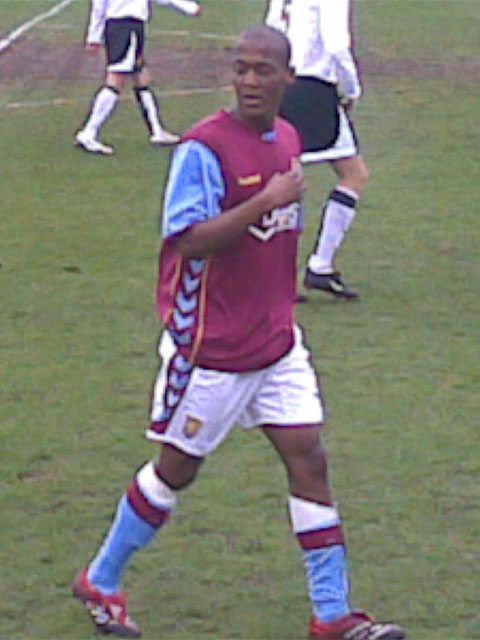

Personal information
- Full name: Christian Tshimanga Kabeya
- Date of birth: 16 June 1987 (age 39)
- Place of birth: Kinshasa, Zaire
- Position: Midfielder

Youth career
- Ronse
- Excelsior Mouscron
- 2003–2006: Aston Villa

Senior career*
Years	Team	Apps	(Gls)
2007–2009	AGOVV Apeldoorn	46	(3)
- Heath Hayes
Total		46	(3)
- * Club domestic league appearances and goals as of 22:11, 21 April 2012 (UTC)

Christian Tshimanga Kabeya (born 16 June 1987) is a Belgian amateur footballer. He began his career at Aston Villa, playing in the 2004 FA Youth Cup final. He later moved on to AGOVV Apeldoorn in the Eerste Divisie (second) division of Dutch football but left the club in 2009 after two seasons. Returning to England, he played for amateur side Heath Hayes.

== Career ==
Born in Kinshasa, Zaire, Kabeya began his playing career with K.S.K. Ronse before he quickly moved to join top flight club Belgian club Excelsior Mouscron. Interest was soon hotting up for the talented youngster, and Aston Villa soon joined the array of interesting parties, trying to capture Kabeya on a scholarship deal. This initially failed, but merely a few months later, out of contract Kabeya opted to sign for Villa. He eventually signed the contract in July 2003.

After an excellent opening season for the academy, Kabeya helped Aston Villa to the final of the 2003-04 FA Youth Cup, despite losing to a much more experienced Middlesbrough team.

In December 2006 he was sacked by Aston Villa and jailed for four months for stealing £5,000 from a team-mate.

On the international front, Kabeya (despite being born in the Democratic Republic of the Congo) has represented Belgium at U16, U17, U18 and U19 level.

He later signed for AGOVV Apeldoorn, but was released in 2009. He later played for Midland Alliance club Heath Hayes.
