= 2008 Dallas Cup =

Tournament details
- Country: United States

The 2008 Dallas Cup was the 29th since its establishment, 12 teams entering in the tournament. The competition was sponsored by Dr Pepper. Liverpool beat UANL Tigres 3–0 in the Championship and won the 2008 Dallas Cup.

== Standings ==
Teams qualified for next round
Teams eliminated from tournament

=== Bracket A ===
Team	Pld	W	D	L	GF	GA	GD	Pts
(Mexico) Monterrey	3	2	1	0	10	3	+7	7
(England) Leicester City	3	2	0	1	5	3	+2	6
(United States) Andromeda	3	1	1	1	7	5	+2	4
(Brazil) São Paulo	3	0	0	3	3	9	–6	0

=== Bracket B ===
Team	Pld	W	D	L	GF	GA	GD	Pts
(England) Liverpool	3	3	0	0	21	2	+19	9
(Mexico) UANL Tigres	3	2	0	1	9	6	+3	6
(Japan) Kashiwa Reysol	3	1	0	2	3	12	–9	3
(Bosnia and Herzegovina) Slavija	3	0	0	3	2	15	–13	0

=== Bracket C ===
Team	Pld	W	D	L	GF	GA	GD	Pts
(Portugal) Benfica	3	2	1	0	7	4	+3	7
(Mexico) Guadalajara	3	0	3	0	5	5	0	3
(Canada) Vancouver Whitecaps	3	0	2	1	5	6	–1	2
(Germany) Eintracht Frankfurt	3	0	2	1	6	8	–2	2

== Semifinal ==
Home team	Score	Away team
Monterrey (Mexico)	1–2	(Mexico) UANL Tigres
Liverpool (England)	2–1	(Portugal) Benfica

== Championship ==
March 23
18:00

Liverpool (England)	3–0	(Mexico) UANL Tigres
Németh 10', 90'; Kelly 26'	(Report)

Pizza Hut Park, Dallas

== Top Scorer ==
Player	Club	Goals
(Mexico) Iván Eliud Torres Martinez	(Mexico) Monterrey	4
(England) Craig Lindfield	(England) Liverpool	6
