= Steven Foley-Sheridan =

Irish footballer

Personal information
- Full name: Steven Foley-Sheridan
- Date of birth: 10 February 1986 (age 40)
- Place of birth: Dublin, Ireland
- Position: Midfielder

Youth career
- Aston Villa

Senior career*
Years	Team	Apps	(Gls)
2005–2006	Aston Villa	0	(0)
2005–2006	→ AFC Bournemouth (loan)	22	(4)
2006–2008	AFC Bournemouth	31	(2)
- * Club domestic league appearances and goals

Steven Foley-Sheridan (or Steven Foley, born 10 February 1986) is an Irish former professional footballer who played for AFC Bournemouth. He played in midfield and featured in Aston Villa's FA Youth Cup win in 2002, and in their run to the final two years later. After over 2 years out injured with a serious back injury, Foley retired in 2008 and returned home where he now manages a fitness centre in Dublin city.

== Honours ==
=== Aston Villa ===
- FA Youth Cup 2001–02

=== Individual ===
- FAI Under-16 International Player of the Year (1): 2002
