= Anthony Peacock =

English footballer

Personal information
- Date of birth: 6 September 1985 (age 41)
- Place of birth: Middlesbrough, England
- Position: Midfielder

Team information
- Current team: Spennymoor Town

Youth career
- Middlesbrough

Senior career*
Years	Team	Apps	(Gls)
2005–2007	Darlington	27	(0)
2006–2007	→ Blyth Spartans (loan)		
2008–	Spennymoor Town		
- * Club domestic league appearances and goals as of 21:32, 1 March 2008 (UTC)

Anthony Peacock (born 6 September 1985, in Middlesbrough) is an English footballer. Peacock was part of Middlesbrough's successful youth teams but was released in 2005 and signed for Darlington. He made 27 league appearances but was again released. He currently plays for Spennymoor Town in County Durham.

== Honours ==
Middlesbrough

- FA Youth Cup: 2003–04
