= Sean Highdale =

English footballer

Personal information
- Date of birth: 4 March 1991 (age 35)
- Place of birth: Liverpool, England
- Position: Midfielder

Youth career
- 2000–2008: Liverpool

Senior career*
| Years | Team | Apps | (Gls) |
| 2008–2011 | Liverpool | 0 | (0) |
| 2010 | → Oldham Athletic (loan) | 0 | (0) |
| 2011 | → Newtown (loan) | 4 | (1) |
| 2011 | Vauxhall Motors | 7 | (0) |
| 2011 | Burscough | | |
| 2013 | Widnes Vikings | | |

International career
- England Under-16
| 2016 | Great Britain Paralympic | | |
- * Club domestic league appearances and goals

Sean Highdale (born 4 March 1991) is an English former footballer who played as a midfielder.

== Early career ==
Highdale joined Liverpool's youth team set up aged 9, and captained the Under-18 side, including being named in the team for the 2007 FA Youth Cup final games. After his last game for Liverpool's academy, Highdale was told he would be moving as a full-time professional to Melwood, the club's main training facility in April 2008.

== Accident and subsequent football career ==
He was a passenger in a car crash in Liverpool which resulted in the death of two of his friends, and left him with critical injuries which included a bleed on his brain, three of the four main ligaments in his right knee being snapped, a broken neck and ankle. It resulted in the removal of a kidney and being in a coma for five days.

After intensive rehabilitation supported by Liverpool, he went on a youth loan to Oldham Athletic before a further loan period with Welsh Premier League club Newtown at the beginning of 2011. At the end of the season, he was released by Liverpool and in July 2011 joined Vauxhall Motors, before moving to Burscough.

In 2013, he was playing in the Liverpool County Premier League for Old Xaverians. Later that season he was awarded a compensatory payout of millions of pounds, which recognised the potential earnings he could have earned in his football career.

In August 2013 he registered as a player for North West Counties Football League club Widnes Vikings.

== Paralympian football ==
In 2016, he was named in the Great Britain team to compete in the football tournament at the 2016 Summer Paralympics in Brazil, eligible as a result of an acquired brain injury from the car accident in 2008. He made his Paralympics debut for the team in a match against Brazil.
