= James Smith (footballer, born 1985) =

English footballer (born 1985)

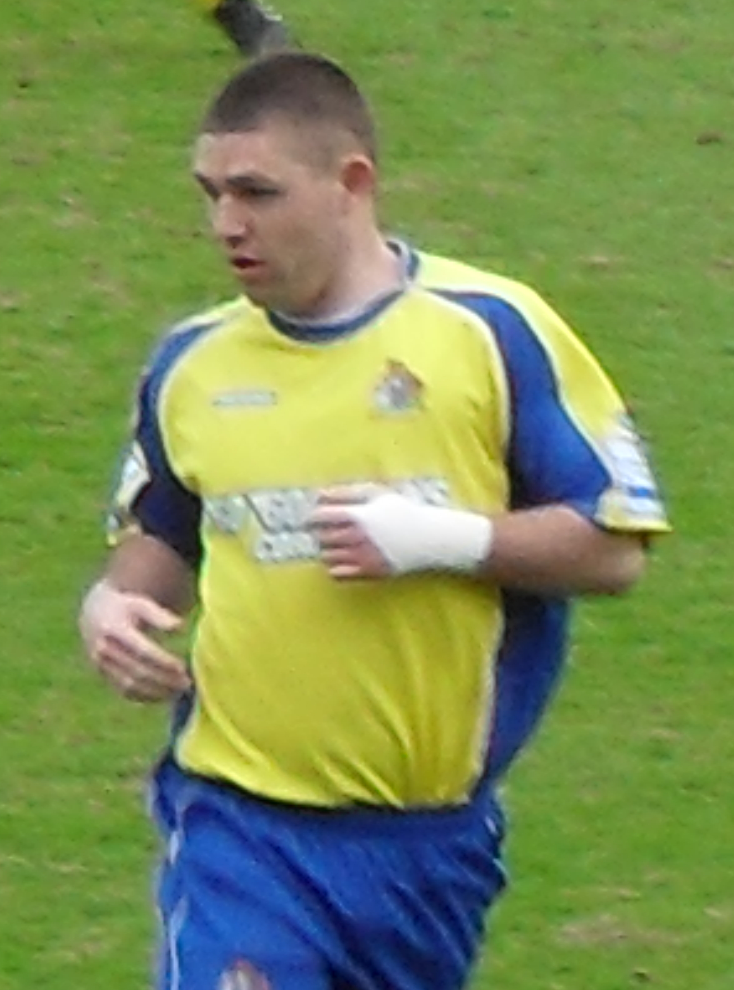
- Smith playing for Altrincham in 2010

Personal information
- Full name: James Smith
- Date of birth: 17 October 1985 (age 41)
- Place of birth: Liverpool, England
- Height: 5 ft 10 in (1.78 m)
- Position: Defender

Team information
- Current team: Southport
- Number: 2

Youth career
- ?–2005: Liverpool

Senior career*
Years	Team	Apps	(Gls)
2005–2007	Liverpool	0	(0)
2007	→ Ross County (loan)	8	(0)
2007	→ Stockport County (loan)	11	(0)
2007–2008	Stockport County	15	(0)
2008–2011	Altrincham	90	(0)
2011	Southport	100	(0)
2014	→ AFC Telford United (loan)	1	(0)
Total		225	(0)
- * Club domestic league appearances and goals as of 11:27, 9 April 2014 (UTC)

James Smith (born 17 October 1985) is an English footballer who has played for several clubs, including Southport, Altrincham, Stockport County and Telford United, as a defender. He Studied at Haileybury College, and played for Luton Academy, later making over 30 appearances in the Scottish Football League and the Football League.

== Career ==
Born in Liverpool, Merseyside, Smith signed his first professional contract with Liverpool in 2005 after coming through from the club's academy. He made his debut and only senior appearance for the club in a League Cup tie against Reading in October 2006 before joining Scottish Football League club Ross County in January 2007 on loan for the remainder of the 2006–07 season, where he made nine league and cup appearances. He joined Stockport County on loan at the beginning of the 2007–08 season and then joined the club on a permanent basis in December 2007 until the end of the season. He made 30 appearances for Stockport County in the 2007–08 season, helping the club to victory over Rochdale in the League Two play-off final in May 2008 and to promotion to League One. He was released after rejecting County's offer of an improved contract.

He signed for Altrincham on 7 November 2008 after a successful trial with the club. On 7 July 2011 Smith signed for Southport and made his competitive club debut on 13 August 2011 on the first day of the 2011–12 season.

After a successful first season with the Conference Premier club, Smith was appointed vice-captain for the 2012/13 season.

It was announced on 25 March 2014 Smith would join his former manager Liam Watson on loan until the end of the season at AFC Telford United to help them win promotion back to the Conference Premier.

== Honours ==
Stockport County

- Football League Two play-offs: 2008
