= Carlin Itonga =

Footballer (born 1982)

Personal information
- Date of birth: 11 December 1982 (age 43)
- Place of birth: Kinshasa, DR Congo
- Position: Striker

Youth career
- 1999–2001: Arsenal

Senior career*
Years	Team	Apps	(Gls)
2001–2003	Arsenal	0	(0)
2002	→ Sheffield Wednesday (loan)	0	(0)
2002	→ Oxford United (loan)	0	(0)
2003	Enfield		
2003	Cambridge City		
2003	Kettering Town	2	(0)
2003–2004	Fisher Athletic		
Total		2+	(0+)
- * Club domestic league appearances and goals

Carlin Itonga (born 11 December 1982) is a former professional footballer who played as a striker.

== Career ==
Itonga was born in the DR Congo, and raised in England. He began his career with Arsenal, winning the FA Youth Cup in 2001, but he made just one first-team appearance, as a substitute against Manchester United in the League Cup in November 2001. While at Arsenal, Itonga broke several youth team records, including once scoring seven goals in an under-19 match. He had a brief loan spell with Sheffield Wednesday, and also at Oxford United, in September 2002.

After leaving Arsenal in early 2003, Itonga had a brief spell at Enfield, before later playing Cambridge City, Kettering Town and Fisher Athletic.

Itonga retired from football in 2004 at the age of just 24 after a series of injuries. He has since been based in both his native DR Congo and London, working with football academies.
