= Israel da Silva =

Brazilian footballer (born 1983)

Personal information
- Full name: Israel Manoel da Silva Filho
- Date of birth: 9 July 1983 (age 43)
- Place of birth: São Paulo, Brazil
- Height: 1.75 m (5 ft 9 in)
- Position: Defender

Youth career
- 1999–2001: Arsenal
- 2002: Flamengo

Senior career*
Years	Team	Apps	(Gls)
2003	Valeriodoce		
2004	Comercial		
2005	Uniclinic		
2006	Ypiranga		
2006	Crateús		
2006–2007	Parnahyba		
2007	Uniclinic		
2007	Petrolina		
2008	Parnahyba		
2008	Salgueiro		
2009–2010	Sete de Setembro		
2010	Sousa	0	(0)
2010	Campinense	2	(0)
2011	Sousa		
2012	CSE		
2012	Lagarto		
2012	Vitória das Tabocas		
2012	Jaguar		
2013	Auto Esporte	15	(1)
Total		17	(1)
- * Club domestic league appearances and goals

Israel Manoel da Silva Filho (born 9 July 1983), commonly known as Israel da Silva, is a Brazilian former footballer. He was the first Brazilian player to sign for Arsenal, when he joined them in 1999.

== Career statistics ==
=== Club ===
Club	Season	League			State League		Cup		Continental		Other		Total	
Club	Season	Division	Apps	Goals	Apps	Goals	Apps	Goals	Apps	Goals	Apps	Goals	Apps	Goals
Sousa	2010	–			0	0	2 (Note: Appearances in the Copa do Brasil)	0	–		0	0	2	0
Campinense	2010	Série C	2	0	0	0	0	0	–		0	0	2	0
Auto Esporte	2013	–			15 (Note: Appearances in the Campeonato Paraibano)	1	0	0	–		0	0	15	1
Career total			2	0	15	1	2	0	0	0	0	0	19	1
