= Godwin Antwi =

Ghanaian footballer (born 1988)

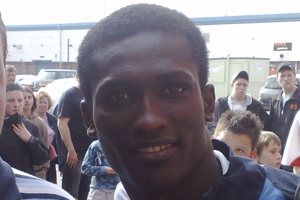
- Antwi in 2008

Personal information
- Full name: Godwin Antwi Birago
- Date of birth: 7 June 1988 (age 38)
- Place of birth: Kumasi, Ghana
- Height: 6 ft 1 in (1.85 m)
- Position: Centre back

Youth career
- –2004: Asante Kotoko
- 2004: San Gregorio
- 2004–2005: Zaragoza
- 2005–2006: Liverpool

Senior career*
Years	Team	Apps	(Gls)
2006–2009	Liverpool	0	(0)
2007	→ Accrington Stanley (loan)	9	(1)
2007–2008	→ Hartlepool United (loan)	27	(1)
2008–2009	→ Tranmere Rovers (loan)	7	(0)
2009	→ Hereford United (loan)	5	(1)
2009–2011	Vejle Boldklub	27	(0)
2011–2013	Vejle Kolding	6	(0)
2013	Bodø/Glimt	19	(0)
2014	Sisaket FC	31	(1)
2015–2016	DRB-Hicom F.C.	29	(1)
2017	Melaka United	12	(0)
Total		172	(5)

International career^{‡}
2006–2008	Spain U-19	4	(0)
- * Club domestic league appearances and goals as of 23 January 2017 ‡ National team caps and goals as of 23 January 2017

Godwin Antwi Birago (born 7 June 1988) is a professional footballer who can play at either centre-back or as a central midfielder. Born in Ghana, he is a youth international for Spain.

== Club career ==
=== Early career ===
Antwi was born in Kumasi, Ghana. When he was 14 years old, he moved to Spain and lived there for three years. He initially played street soccer, before he entered the youth setup of Spanish club Real Zaragoza for 1 year. He eventually obtained a Spanish passport.

=== Liverpool ===
At 17 years of age, he was spotted by Paco Herrera, then head scout of Liverpool. He watched Liverpool beat Chelsea home at Anfield in the semi-final of the 2005 UEFA Champions League. The experience of hearing the Anfield crowd left a great impression on him, and he expressed a desire to reach the status of former African Liverpool player, Guinean international striker Titi Camara. He joined Liverpool, who had newly been crowned the UEFA Champions League winners, when Liverpool manager Rafael Benítez offered him a contract in August 2005.

He started his Liverpool career, playing in the reserve team during the 2005–06 season. Due to a striker shortage, he initially played up front. In his usual defending position, he helped Liverpool win the 2006 FA Youth Cup, beating Manchester City in the final.

On 8 November 2006, Antwi was called up by the Under-19 Youth setup of the Spain national team to train with them. The call-up was possible due to his Spanish passport. Despite the Spain Under-19 team call-up, Antwi could freely choose which country to represent at a senior level before he turned 21 years old.

On 10 January 2007, Antwi was named captain of the Liverpool Reserves for the first time, and the 18-year-old led by example at the back against the experienced Neil Shipperley of Sheffield United. On 13 March, it was announced that he had joined Accrington Stanley on a month's loan. He remained at Stanley until the end of the season.

Antwi joined Hartlepool United on a season-long loan for the 2007–08 season on 29 June 2007. He scored his first goal for Hartlepool against Doncaster on 18 August 2007.

In July 2008 he joined Tranmere Rovers on loan until January 2009. He returned to Anfield, only to be loaned out again in February 2009, this time to League One side Hereford United, and made his debut in their 2–0 home win over Leeds United.

Antwi was released by Liverpool FC on 16 June 2009.

=== Vejle BK ===
On 23 December Antwi signed a half-year-long contract with Danish club Vejle BK.

=== Bodø/Glimt ===
After his contract with Vejle expired, Antwi signed a half-year contract with Norwegian First Division side Bodø/Glimt on 30 July 2013. He made his debut in the 2–0 victory against Sandefjord.

=== Sisaket FC ===
Antwi signed for Sisaket of the Thai Premier League on 23 February 2014. He made his debut in the 0–1 loss against Osotspa Saraburi F.C.

On 15 October 2014 Antwi scored his first goal in Thai Premier League in 1–3 loss against Buriram United.

=== DRB-Hicom FC ===
Despite Sisaket FC's offer to extend his contract, Antwi made a decision to sign with a Malaysia Premier League side, DRB-Hicom F.C. He continues to be an influential figure in the club, providing his team defence and much needed leadership at the back.

=== Melaka United ===
However, after a year and a half playing, DRB-Hicom F.C. announced they will defunct the senior team for financial reason. Released as a free agent, it didn't take too long for Antwi to find a new club following a strong performance in Malaysia Premier League 2016 season. He was immediately signed by Melaka United F.C. following their promotion to Malaysia Super League.

== Honours ==
=== Club ===
Liverpool Youth

- FA Youth Cup: 2005–06

Bodø/Glimt

- Norwegian First Division: 2013
