= Lee Sims =

American pianist and composer (1898–1966)

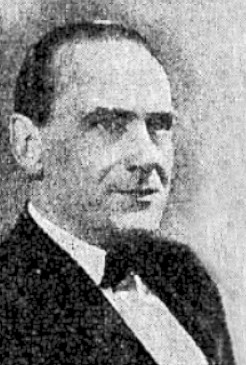
- Sims c. 1943

Background information
- Born: Cleo Orville Sims; April 30, 1898; Champaign, Illinois, U.S.
- Died: May 7, 1966 (aged 68)
- Genres: Ragtime; jazz
- Occupations: Musician; composer; record maker; publisher; performer
- Instrument: Piano
- Years active: 1900s–1960s
- Label: Brunswick
- Spouse: Ilomay Bailey

Cleo Orville "Lee" Sims (April 30, 1898 – May 7, 1966) was an American pianist, composer, record maker, publisher, and performer.

== Early life ==
Cleo Orville Sims was born April 30, 1898, in Champaign, Illinois. Growing up, he lived in Cedar Rapids, Iowa, and at the age of eight, he played ragtime and waltzes for a YMCA calisthenics class there. By age 11, he was accompanying church singers and playing the theatre pipe organ for silent movies. At 14, he played at the Majestic Theater in La Salle, Illinois. While still in his teens, he went to work for a pipe organ manufacturer, demonstrating instruments all over the country.

== Career ==
At age 22, Sims decided to settle down in Chicago. He began making piano rolls for the United States Piano Roll Company and other piano roll companies. Today, these rolls are sought after by collectors. He became studio manager for WTAS, one of the first radio stations in the Middle West. Later, he was studio manager of KYW, the Westinghouse station in Chicago, and WBBM, then the Stewart-Warner "theatre of the air".

As a radio performer, Sims had a late-night program called Piano Moods over the Chicago NBC affiliate station WMAQ. He founded the Lee Sims School of Music, and one of his pupils was Ilomay Bailey, who had been a vocalist with the Paul Ash and Ben Pollack orchestras. Prior to singing with these orchestras, Bailey had had formal vocal training. The two were married and formed a team; Sims introduced Bailey on his Piano Moods and created an instant sensation.

In the 1930s, Lee and Ilomay appeared as stars of The Chase and Sanborn Hour night program for the National Broadcasting Company. Other radio appearances included on Rudy Vallée's program and the Ben Bernie and Phil Baker shows. In the 1937 movie Dinner at the Ritz (starring David Niven, Annabelle, and Paul Lukas), Sims can be heard on piano with a band directed by Muir Mathieson, although the band on screen is an unknown black outfit.

During the 1920s and 1930s, Sims recorded approximately 60 sides for Brunswick. He published several courses on modern piano and numerous arrangements (or "transcriptions") of popular tunes of the day. Many original sheet music editions included a bonus Lee Sims chorus for the more proficient and adventurous performers. After his heyday as a radio performer and recording artist, Sims devoted most of his time to teaching in his New York studio apartment, where Bailey taught voice.

== Influence and style ==
Sims was deeply imbued with the nineteenth-century European tradition and especially interested in the newer, impressionistic harmonies of Debussy and Ravel. While he recorded mostly sentimental popular songs, he had more serious ideas and aspirations. In 1928, his collection Five Piano Rhapsodies was published. In that same year, Sims recorded two of the Rhapsodies arranged for piano and orchestra on a Brunswick 12″ disc. Sims appeared with the London Symphony Orchestra to play his symphonic tone poem "Blythewood", with orchestration by Ferde Grofé. Art Tatum biographer James Lester described Sims's compositions as being "drawn from the same sources as Bix Beiderbecke's 'In a Mist'."

Sims's style, though somewhat outside of the realm of jazz, as it is typically considered today, was well within it in the era of his prominence. Nevertheless, Sims influenced the great jazz pianist Art Tatum, who used chord voicings and other devices that Sims employed, for example, the exploration of a song at its outset in a legato style, along with "Debussy-esque" chords, prior to launching into "bouncier" tempos and rhythms.
