= Steven Irwin =

English footballer

Personal information
- Date of birth: 29 September 1990 (age 36)
- Place of birth: Liverpool, England
- Height: 1.73 m (5 ft 8 in)
- Position: Midfielder

Team information
- Current team: Widnes

Youth career
- 2006–2008: Liverpool

Senior career*
Years	Team	Apps	(Gls)
2008–2011	Liverpool	0	(0)
2011	Telstar	3	(0)
2012	FF Jaro	9	(0)
2015	AaB		
2017	Skelmersdale United		
2017–2018	FC United of Manchester	28	(4)
2018	Stalybridge Celtic	3	(0)
2018–2020	Marine	61	(3)
2022	Marine	7	(0)
2022	Warrington Rylands	15	(0)
2022–	Widnes	0	(0)
- * Club domestic league appearances and goals as of 16:54, 18 March 2022 (UTC)

Steven Irwin (born 29 September 1990) is an English footballer who plays as a midfielder for Widnes.

== Career ==
Irwin played youth football in his native England with Liverpool. He trialled with Scottish club Aberdeen in January 2011, with a view to a loan deal. He was released by Liverpool in June 2011.

Later that summer he signed for Dutch club Telstar, making his senior professional debut for them during the 2011–12 season.

On 17 November 2011, Telstar coach Jan Poortvliet confirmed Irwin had left the club, citing homesickness as a factor in his departure.

In September 2012 he signed for Finnish Premier League club FF Jaro.

After playing in Denmark in 2015 for AaB, in February 2017 he signed for English non-league side Skelmersdale United.

In August 2017 he signed for FC United of Manchester. During his time at FC United, he made 28 league appearances scoring four goals.

After a spell at Stalybridge Celtic, Irwin joined Northern Premier League side Marine in September 2018.

He retired at the end of the 2019–20 season, but returned to playing in January 2022 after re-signing with Marine. He left Marine for Warrington Rylands in March 2022.

Irwin played as a goalkeeper for Warrington Rylands against their rivals Warrington Town on 4 October 2022 due to the club not having a recognised keeper.

On 28 October 2022 Irwin signed for Widnes.
