= Niccolò Galli (footballer, born 1983) =

Italian footballer

Personal information
- Date of birth: 22 May 1983
- Place of birth: Florence, Italy
- Date of death: 9 February 2001 (aged 17)
- Place of death: Bologna, Italy
- Height: 1.88 m (6 ft 2 in)
- Position: Centre-back

Youth career
- 1993–1994: Torino
- 1994–1995: Parma
- 1995–1999: Fiorentina
- 1999–2001: Arsenal

Senior career*
Years	Team	Apps	(Gls)
2000–2001	Arsenal	0	(0)
2000–2001	→ Bologna (loan)	1	(0)

International career
1999	Italy U16	1	(0)
2000–2001	Italy U17	5	(1)
2000	Italy U18	3	(2)
- * Club domestic league appearances and goals

Niccolò Galli (22 May 1983 — 9 February 2001) was an Italian professional footballer who played as a centre-back.

== Career ==
Galli began his career with his hometown club, Fiorentina, and moved to Arsenal in August 1999. He spent one year in London, winning the FA Youth Cup in 2000, then returned to Italy to finish his studies: he was on loan with Bologna during this time. At Bologna, Galli was considered one of the most promising young central defenders in world football after featuring in Serie A and being capped by Italy's youth teams.

== Death ==
On 9 February 2001, Galli died in a road accident while riding on his moped, on the way home from practice at Bologna's training centre, aged 17.

== Legacy ==
Following his death, Arsenal manager Arsène Wenger and Head of Youth Development and Academy Director Liam Brady both praised the young defender and stated he would have been a certainty to make the Arsenal first team but for his death. Wenger even went as far as to state, “I have no doubt in my mind that had he lived, he would have been captain of Arsenal and Italy.” Brady later also stated, "I always remember Niccolo. Losing a boy that young was a real tragedy. He was a great footballing talent. He had a great future ahead of him." He stated that he stood out from his teammates due to his "maturity and intelligence", describing him as a "complete player", stating: "He had it all -- the ball control, passing, the physicality."

Bologna's training centre, in the neighbourhood of Casteldebole, is named after Galli; the club also retired his number 27 shirt, which was the same squad number Galli's childhood friend and youth academy teammate, Fabio Quagliarella, wore during his career in Galli's honour. A foundation has also been dedicated to Galli in his honour. Arsenal observed a minute's silence in memory of Galli's death.

== Personal life ==
Niccolò's father Giovanni Galli, was also a professional footballer; a former goalkeeper, he played for Fiorentina, Milan, Napoli, Torino, Parma, and Lucchese, as well as the Italy national team, before pursuing a career in politics after his retirement. His mother's name is Anna; he also had two sisters, Camilla and Carolina.
