= Miki Roqué =

Spanish footballer (1988–2012)

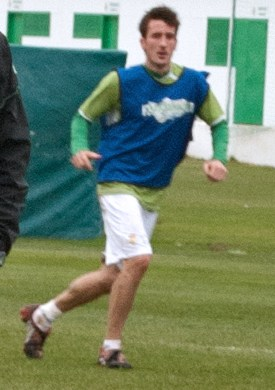
- Roqué training with Betis in 2010

Personal information
- Full name: Miguel Roqué Farrero
- Date of birth: 8 July 1988
- Place of birth: Tremp, Spain
- Date of death: 24 June 2012 (aged 23)
- Place of death: Barcelona, Spain
- Height: 1.86 m (6 ft 1 in)
- Position: Centre-back

Youth career
- Algar
- 2004–2005: Lleida
- 2005–2007: Liverpool

Senior career*
| Years | Team | Apps | (Gls) |
| 2006–2009 | Liverpool | 0 | (0) |
| 2007 | → Oldham Athletic (loan) | 4 | (0) |
| 2007–2008 | → Xerez (loan) | 1 | (0) |
| 2008–2009 | → Cartagena (loan) | 30 | (3) |
| 2009–2010 | Betis B | 31 | (1) |
| 2010–2012 | Betis | 12 | (2) |
| Total | | 78 | (6) |

International career
| 2006–2007 | Spain U19 | 3 | (1) |
- * Club domestic league appearances and goals

Miguel "Miki" Roqué Farrero (8 July 1988 – 24 June 2012) was a Spanish professional footballer who played as a central defender.

He signed with Liverpool before his 18th birthday, going on to be loaned to several teams in England and Spain for the duration of his contract. In 2009 he joined Betis, playing in Segunda División with the club.

Roqué died in June 2012 at the age of 23, due to cancer.

== Club career ==
=== Early years and Liverpool ===
Roqué was born in Tremp, Lleida, Catalonia. At only 17 he was signed from local side UE Lleida by Liverpool, managed by countryman Rafael Benítez. He came on as a substitute in both legs of the 2006 FA Youth Cup Final against Manchester City, heading the last goal of a 3–0 win at Anfield in the first leg; he made his first-team debut in the 2006–07 UEFA Champions League against Galatasaray SK on 5 December 2006 – also coming from the bench, replacing another Spaniard, Xabi Alonso – in the 3–2 away loss.

On 21 March 2007, Roqué went on an emergency loan to Football League One club Oldham Athletic. Ten days later, he played his first match in a domestic league, filling in for goalscorer Gary McDonald for the final minute of a 1–0 win over Yeovil Town at Boundary Park. He made three further appearances over the season, ending with his first start on 21 April, a 2–1 defeat at Crewe Alexandra.

Roqué returned to Spain on 3 August 2007, signing for Xerez CD of Segunda División again on a temporary basis. He made his debut for them on 5 September, as they defeated Racing de Ferrol 3–1 at home in the second round of the Copa del Rey; despite also playing in the triumph at Albacete Balompié in the next round, and both legs of the defeat to Recreativo de Huelva in the round of 32, he only featured once in the league – a 3–1 away loss to CD Tenerife on 18 November.

In the following campaign, Roqué was much more used by FC Cartagena, helping the Murcian club to promote from Segunda División B.

=== Betis ===
On 16 June 2009, Liverpool released Roqué after a four-year stay, and he returned to Spain with Real Betis' reserves the following month. He was sent off three times in his first season.

Roqué started appearing with the main squad in 2010–11, making his debut on 9 October after replacing Rovérsio late into the first half of a 2–2 draw at UD Las Palmas. He totalled 12 games (ten starts) and two goals, as the Andalusians returned to La Liga after a two-year absence.

== Health and death ==
A person never dies completely when they are remembered by those who knew them. And every 26th minute at the Estadio Benito Villamarín, we feel that Miki is together with us

— Betis president Miguel Guillén in 2013.

On 5 March 2011, after undergoing a routine check-up due to back problems, Roqué was diagnosed with pelvic cancer, undergoing surgery to excise a malignant tumor the following day. Betis' supporters raised funds for his treatment, while Carles Puyol, of the same province, financed €30,000 for specialist private treatment.

On 24 June 2012, after just over a year of illness, Roqué lost his battle against cancer and died, at age 23. His death prompted a series of tributes on Twitter, including from several international players competing in UEFA Euro 2012, and on 1 July, after the final of the continental competition, Spain goalkeeper Pepe Reina (his former Liverpool teammate) wore a Betis shirt featuring Roqué's name during the players' victory lap of the Olympic Stadium in Kyiv; also, Cesc Fàbregas wore a shirt with the names of Roqué, Dani Jarque, Manuel Preciado and Antonio Puerta.

Roqué became known as "The Eternal 26" to Betis fans, in reference to his kit number during his spell at the Estadio Benito Villamarín, and they chanted his name in the 26th minute of each half of a match. In 2013, a monolith dedicated to him was unveiled in his hometown, with a plaque endowed with the crests of the clubs that he represented.

During his illness, Roqué worked with writer Juan Manuel López: to have a book on himself published was one of his two wishes, the other being to return to football. La Luz de Miki Roqué (The Light of Miki Roqué) was released in March 2015, featuring contributions from his family and Betis staff.

== Honours ==
Betis

- Segunda División: 2010–11

== See also ==
- List of sportspeople who died during their careers
