= Michael Burns (English footballer) =

English footballer

Personal information
- Full name: Michael John Burns
- Date of birth: 14 September 1988 (age 38)
- Place of birth: Huyton, England
- Position: Midfielder

Youth career
- 2001–2007: Liverpool
- 2007–2008: Bolton Wanderers

Senior career*
Years	Team	Apps	(Gls)
2009–2010	Carlisle United	11	(0)
2010–2011	→ Stafford Rangers (loan)	10	(0)
2011	Newport County	1	(0)
2011	Guiseley		
2012–2013	Vauxhall Motors		
2013	Guiseley		
2014	Gap Connah's Quay	10	(0)
2017	Widnes		
2019–2020	Parklands		

International career^{‡}
2004	England U16	3	(0)
- * Club domestic league appearances and goals as of 12:34, 29 Jan 2011 (UTC) ‡ National team caps and goals as of 18:36, 30 June 2009 (UTC)

Michael John Burns (born 4 October 1988) is an English footballer. He played in the English Football League for Carlisle United and as a youth player was twice a winner of the FA Youth Cup with Liverpool.

== Club career ==
=== Early career ===
He was previously a player with Liverpool winning the FA Youth Cup twice in 2006 and 2007. He later joined Bolton Wanderers in the summer of 2007, having been signed by Sammy Lee. He made regular appearances for the reserves whilst at Bolton's academy.

=== Carlisle United ===
He went on trial to Gillingham in the summer of 2008 before going on trial with Carlisle United. In January 2009 he joined Carlisle, signing an eighteen-month contract. He then made his Carlisle debut on 10 February 2009 in the Football League One clash with Walsall.

On 21 January 2010 he joined Stafford Rangers on loan for a month, which was then extended for a second month. He appeared in all 11 games for the club during his loan period.

=== Newport County ===
In January 2011 Burns joined Newport County.

=== Guiseley ===
In June 2011 he joined Guiseley.

=== Vauxhall Motors ===
In June 2012 he joined Vauxhall Motors.

=== Return to Guiseley ===
In August 2013 he returned to Guiseley but left the club just two weeks later.

=== Gap Connah's Quay ===
In January 2014 he signed for Welsh Premier League team Gap Connah's Quay.

=== Widnes ===
After time out of football, in July 2017 he joined Widnes.

In 2019 he joined Parklands FC.

== Family life ==
Micheal married Hannah Burns and has three children, Riley Burns, Maisy Burns, and Esmae Burns.

== International career ==
Burns represented England schoolboy and at Under-16 levels. He scored on his Under-16 debut in a 4-2 victory over Wales.

== Honours ==
Liverpool

- FA Youth Cup: Winner 2007
- FA Youth Cup: Winner 2006
