= Danny Reed =

Danny Reed is an American radio broadcaster with The Citadel Bulldogs in Charleston, South Carolina.

== Biography ==
He calls football, basketball, and baseball for The Citadel Bulldogs since 2011 and hosts television and radio coaches show. Prior to The Citadel, he was the radio voice and the Communications Coordinator for the Charleston RiverDogs, the Class-A Atlantic League affiliate of the New York Yankees as well as hosting a weekly manager's show and even called high school football for Yahoo Sports Radio 950 AM and ESPN Radio 910. Before moving to Charleston, he was the public address announcer for the Hagerstown Suns. Reed also was employed by ESPN3 for their coverage of college basketball and was a fill-in play-by-play broadcaster for the Tennessee-Chattanooga Mocs women's basketball team.

== Personal ==
Reed was originally from Cumberland, Maryland and is a graduate of Waynesburg College while calling men's and women's basketball and high school football for WCYJ-FM.
