= Robbie Threlfall =

English footballer (born 1988)

Personal information
- Full name: Robert Richard Threlfall
- Date of birth: 28 November 1988 (age 37)
- Place of birth: Liverpool, England
- Position: Left back

Youth career
- Liverpool

Senior career*
| Years | Team | Apps | (Gls) |
| 2006–2010 | Liverpool | 0 | (0) |
| 2007–2008 | → Hereford United (loan) | 9 | (0) |
| 2008–2009 | → Hereford United (loan) | 3 | (0) |
| 2009 | → Stockport County (loan) | 2 | (0) |
| 2009 | → Northampton Town (loan) | 4 | (0) |
| 2010 | → Bradford City (loan) | 17 | (2) |
| 2010–2012 | Bradford City | 37 | (0) |
| 2012–2014 | Morecambe | 54 | (2) |
| 2016–2017 | Marine | 10 | (0) |
| Total | | 136 | (4) |

International career
| 2007 | England U19 | 1 | (0) |
- * Club domestic league appearances and goals

Robert Richard Threlfall (born 28 November 1988) is an English former footballer who played as a left-back.

== Club career ==
=== Liverpool ===
Born in Liverpool, Threlfall began his career moving through the Liverpool youth ranks, training at the club's academy and eventually graduating to Melwood in the 2006–07 season. Threlfall twice won the FA Youth Cup at Liverpool; first in 2006, then again in the following season's competition.

He made his first senior appearance for the club against Wrexham in a pre-season friendly. Subsequently, he became a regular in the Liverpool Reserves, also making his England Under-19 debut against Poland in Bournemouth on 6 February 2007. Threlfall played a major role in the 2007 FA Youth Cup final, firstly scoring a first-leg own-goal which put rivals Manchester United ahead. He scored in the second-leg to level the score and finished a crucial penalty kick helping the Merseyside club retain the title.

Whilst with Liverpool he was capped once by England at Under 19 level.

=== Lower division loans ===
He spent much of the 2007–08 season on loan at Hereford United but was only able to play 12 games as a result of an injury sustained in the FA Cup against Hartlepool. Threlfall re-signed for the Bulls on loan for six months, at the start of the 2008–09 season. He started the first three league games of the season, as well as a League Cup match, before breaking his foot in early September.

He later joined Stockport County on loan for a month on 6 February 2009, consequently making two league appearances. A further loan followed at League Two side Northampton Town from 21 August 2009, with his club debut coming the next day coming on as an injury time substitute for Ryan Gilligan in the Cobblers 2–0 win over AFC Bournemouth. His first start came in 2–2 draw against Wycombe Wanderers in the Football League Trophy, Northampton won 3–0 on penalties.

In October 2009, he was set to make another loan move this time to Darlington but had a change of heart the following day.

In February 2010, he joined Bradford City on loan to become new manager Peter Taylor's first signing, and scored on his debut on 23 February in a 3–1 win against Rochdale. His second career goal came against Port Vale three games later. On 22 March, it was announced that his loan deal had been extended until the end of the season.

On 26 May, Liverpool announced they would be releasing Threlfall, along with goalkeeper Chris Oldfield.

=== Morecambe ===
He signed for League 2 side, Morecambe on a two-year contract, on 17 May 2012. He scored his first goal for Morecambe against Rotherham United on 6 April 2013. Threlfall was released by the club on 6 May 2014.

=== Marine ===
In the 2016/17 season he returned to playing semi-professionally, making sixteen appearances and scoring twice for Marine F.C. before leaving the club in January 2017.

== Honours ==
- FA Youth Cup: 2006, 2007

== Career statistics ==
As of 24 March 2014.

Appearances and goals by club, season and competition
| Club | Season | League | | FA Cup | | League Cup | | Other | | Total | |
| Club | Season | Apps | Goals | Apps | Goals | Apps | Goals | Apps | Goals | Apps | Goals |
|---|---|---|---|---|---|---|---|---|---|---|---|
| Hereford United (loan) | 2007–08 | 9 | 0 | 3 | 0 | 0 | 0 | 0 | 0 | 12 | 0 |
| Hereford United (loan) | 2008–09 | 3 | 0 | 0 | 0 | 1 | 0 | 0 | 0 | 4 | 0 |
| Stockport County (loan) | 2008–09 | 2 | 0 | 0 | 0 | 0 | 0 | 0 | 0 | 2 | 0 |
| Northampton Town (loan) | 2009–10 | 4 | 0 | 0 | 0 | 0 | 0 | 1 | 0 | 5 | 0 |
| Bradford City (loan) | 2009–10 | 17 | 2 | 0 | 0 | 0 | 0 | 0 | 0 | 17 | 2 |
| Bradford City | 2010–11 | 20 | 0 | 0 | 0 | 0 | 0 | 0 | 0 | 20 | 0 |
| Bradford City | 2011–12 | 17 | 0 | 1 | 0 | 1 | 0 | 2 | 0 | 21 | 0 |
| Morecambe | 2012–13 | 25 | 1 | 1 | 0 | 2 | 0 | 0 | 0 | 28 | 1 |
| Morecambe | 2013–14 | 29 | 1 | 1 | 0 | 0 | 0 | 1 | 0 | 31 | 1 |
| Career total | | 126 | 4 | 6 | 0 | 4 | 0 | 4 | 0 | 139 | 4 |
