= Craig Lindfield =

English footballer (born 1988)

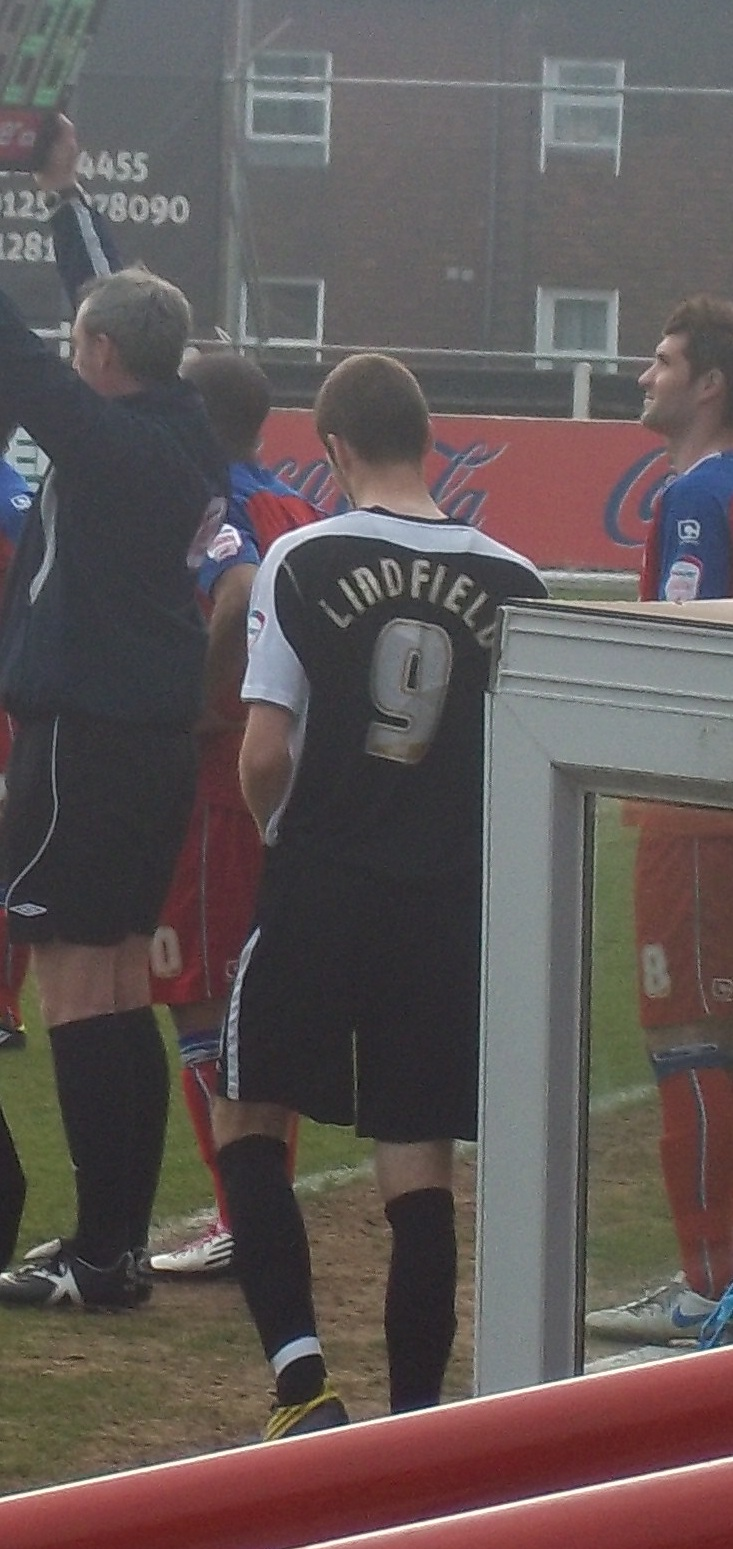
- Lindfield with Accrington Stanley in 2009

Personal information
- Full name: Craig Anthony Lindfield
- Date of birth: 7 September 1988 (age 38)
- Place of birth: Greasby, England
- Height: 6 ft 0 in (1.83 m)
- Position: Forward

Team information
- Current team: Bala Town
- Number: 9

Youth career
- 1996–2006: Liverpool

Senior career*
Years	Team	Apps	(Gls)
2006–2009	Liverpool	0	(0)
2007	→ Notts County (loan)	3	(1)
2008	→ Chester City (loan)	7	(0)
2008	→ AFC Bournemouth (loan)	3	(1)
2009	→ Accrington Stanley (loan)	20	(2)
2010	Macclesfield Town	18	(2)
2010–2013	Accrington Stanley	84	(5)
2010	→ Kidderminster Harriers (loan)	1	(0)
2013–2014	Chester	22	(2)
2014–2016	FC United of Manchester	67	(19)
2016	→ Ashton United (loan)	?	(?)
2016–2017	Marine	10	(1)
2017	Trafford		
2017–2018	FC United of Manchester	30	(7)
2018	Nantwich Town	13	(4)
2018–2019	Runcorn Town (dual reg)	6	(1)
2019	Curzon Ashton	1	(0)
2019	Radcliffe	7	(0)
2019–2020	Marine	21	(8)
2020–2022	Runcorn Linnets	15	(4)
2022–2023	Colwyn Bay	30	(9)
2023–2024	Airbus UK Broughton	23	(14)
2024–2025	Colwyn Bay	28	(20)
2025–2026	Holywell Town	29	(21)
2026–	Bala Town	6	(6)

International career
2006–2007	England U19	7	(3)
- * Club domestic league appearances and goals as of 08:43, 8 November 2026 (UTC)

Craig Anthony Lindfield (born 7 September 1988) is an English semi-professional footballer who plays as a winger for Cymru North club Bala Town.

== Early life ==
Lindfield attended Brookdale Primary School from 1993 to 2000 and then Calday Grange Grammar School between 2000 and 2005, and played cricket for his local club Upton CC.

== Youth career ==
He joined the Liverpool Academy in 1996 aged 8, and worked his way up through the club's youth teams. In 2005–06 he won the FA Youth Cup for the first time as a 17-year-old when Liverpool beat Manchester City 3–2 on aggregate, finishing the competition as Liverpool's leading goal scorer in the competition. In 2006–07, he scored 3 goals, including 2 in front of the Kop at Anfield in the 7–3 aggregate score against Newcastle in the semi-final of the 2006–07 FA Youth Cup to secure a place in Liverpool's second consecutive final appearance.

In the final they faced archrivals Manchester United. He scored the opener in the first leg which they lost 2–1. In the return leg, held at Old Trafford on 26 April 2007, Liverpool won 4–3 on penalties when the score stood at 2–2 on aggregate after extra time. Craig scored the second penalty in the penalty shoot-out at the Stretford End, bringing his goal tally to 12 in 12 Youth Cup games.

== Senior career ==
=== Liverpool ===
In the summer of 2006 he was promoted from the academy to the first team squad. On 22 July 2006, he made his debut for Liverpool's senior team in a pre-season friendly against Crewe. He scored the only goal when Robbie Fowler back heeled the ball into his path and it was dispatched by him left footed into the top corner of the net as the Reds triumphed 1–0.

He was a member of Liverpool's 2008 Dallas Cup winning side, returning from the US as the tournament's top scorer with 6 goals. In July 2009 he had a double hernia operation and on 11 August 2009 his contract with Liverpool was terminated by mutual consent

=== Loan spells ===
On 1 November 2007 he joined Notts County on a month's loan, and on 3 November 2007 he scored 23 minutes into his league debut against Accrington Stanley which ended in a 2–0 win to the Magpies. He made seven appearances before returning to Liverpool at the end of the loan period.

On 18 January 2008 he returned to League Two when he joined Chester City in a one-month loan deal. His debut for the club came as a substitute the following day, in a 1–0 loss to his former loan club Notts County, with his final game coming against the same opponents the following month. He then returned to Liverpool.

On 22 August 2008 he joined AFC Bournemouth on an initial one-month loan deal and on 30 August on his full debut he scored against Port Vale. His loan was extended until the end of 2008.

In January 2009 he gained further Football League experience when he went on loan to Accrington Stanley, where he scored his first goal for the club on 28 February in a league match against Aldershot Town. and he scored his second goal for the club on 21 March 2009 in league match against Exeter City.

=== Macclesfield Town ===
He subsequently had trials with Carlisle United and Morecambe before training with Accrington Stanley and later with Macclesfield Town and an impressive trial at Macclesfield offered Linfield a contract and he joined Macclesfield Town in December 2009 on a short-term deal, scoring first goal for the Silkmen in a 2–2 draw on his home debut against Morecambe on 26 January 2010. After some impressive performances his contract was extended until the end of the season on 26 February 2010. On 13 March 2010, Linfield scored his second goal for the Silkmen in a 2–0 win over Bury. At the end of the 2009–10 campaign, he was released by the club, along with ten other players at the end of the 2009–10 season.

=== Accrington Stanley ===
He re-signed for Accrington Stanley in June 2010 on a one-year contract. His first goal for Stanley in his second spell with the club came on 10 August 2010 when he scored the extra-time winning goal in a League Cup match to knock Doncaster Rovers out of the competition.

After suffering a knee injury in late August, on 26 November 2010 he signed a short-term loan deal with Kidderminster Harriers in an attempt to gain match fitness. He made his debut for the club on 30 November in a Football Conference match against York City where he came on for the last 12 minutes. All subsequent football league games were postponed due to the weather and he returned to Accrington on 23 December 2010.

In the 2011–12 season, he scored for the club as Accrington Stanley beat Dagenham & Redbridge 3–0 and received the man of the match from the sponsors. His second goal came when Accrington Stanley beat AFC Wimbledon 2–0. His third league goal for the club as Accrington Stanley beat Macclesfield Town 4–0. His fourth league goal for the club as Accrington Stanley beat Northampton Town 2–1.

He finished the last six games of the season as right back due to a shortage of defenders through injuries and suspensions and received high praise from his manager Paul Cook for the performances that he put in during that period. He was rewarded with a new one-year contract and signed on 3 May 2012.

=== Chester ===
On 29 May 2013, Chester announced the signing of Lindfield after his Accrington contract came to an end.

=== FC United of Manchester ===
On 30 June 2014, FC United of Manchester announced the signing of Lindfield after joining from Chester FC. On 4 March 2016 Lindfield was loaned out to Ashton United in a one-month deal. The deal was extended on 4 April 2016 until the end of the season.

=== Marine ===
Lindfield signed for Marine on 23 July 2016.

=== Trafford ===
On 4 March 2017, Lindfield signed for Northern Premier League-side Trafford.

=== FC United of Manchester (second spell) ===
In July 2017 he re-joined FC United of Manchester having played a number of pre-season friendlies for the club, scoring four goals.

=== Nantwich Town ===
In August 2018 he joined Nantwich Town. Whilst at the club he went on dual registration with Runcorn Town in September 2018.

=== Curzon Ashton ===
In January 2019 he joined Curzon Ashton.

=== Radcliffe ===
The following month he moved to Radcliffe.

=== Marine (second spell) ===
In July 2019 he rejoined Marine.

=== Runcorn Linnets ===
In January 2020 he joined Runcorn Linnets.

=== Colwyn Bay ===
In January 2022 he moved to Cymru North club Colwyn Bay. During his time with Colwyn Bay, Craig helped the team achieve promotion to the Cymru Premier for the first time in the club's history. He also scored two goals in the Welsh Blood Service League Cup final in a 3-1 win over Porthmadog, helping secure a league and cup double for the club.

=== Airbus UK Broughton ===
In June 2023 he moved to Cymru North club Airbus UK Broughton. Craig scored on his debut in a 3-0 win over Guilsfield F.C.

=== Colwyn Bay ===
For the 2024–25 season he returned to his former club, Colwyn Bay where he finished the season as the club's top scorer and with a league medal as the club won the Cymru North title.

=== Holywell Town ===
In summer 2025 he joined Holywell Town and had a successful season for the club culminating in the club gaining promotion to the Cymru Premier.

=== Bala Town ===
In June 2026 he joined Bala Town.

== International career ==
Lindfield received England U19 international recognition when he was called up and then selected for the international friendly against the Netherlands on 5 September 2006 held at the Bescot Stadium, Walsall. He also represented his country in the friendly international tournament held in Austria in October 2006, scoring two goals against Austria in a 3–3 draw on 9 October 2006.

== Personal life ==
He has a first class degree in Sports Journalism and as part of his journalism course he wrote columns for the Lancashire Telegraph and the Daily Mail. The degree was from Staffordshire University and was studied via distance-learning. Following on from completion of this degree he studied for a second degree in Quantity Surveying at Liverpool John Moores University and now works in this field.

== Honours ==
Liverpool

- FA Youth Cup: 2005–06, 2006–07
- Dallas Cup: 2008
- FA Premier Reserve League: 2007–08

F.C. United of Manchester

- Northern Premier League Premier Division: 2014–15

Radcliffe

- Northern Premier League Division One play-offs: 2018–19

Colwyn Bay

- Cymru North League Champions: 2022-23, 2024-25
- Welsh Blood Service League Cup winner: 2022-23
