= 2001–02 Arsenal F.C. season =

English football club season

Arsenal
2001–02 season
- Chairman: Peter Hill-Wood
- Manager: Arsène Wenger
- Stadium: Highbury
- Premier League: 1st
- FA Cup: Winners
- League Cup: Fifth round
- UEFA Champions League: Second group stage
- Top goalscorer: League: Thierry Henry (24); All: Thierry Henry (32)
- Highest home attendance: 38,254 vs Everton (11 May 2002)
- Lowest home attendance: 16,917 vs Grimsby Town (27 November 2001)
- Average home league attendance: 36,541 (in all competitions)
Home colours	Away colours	Third colours

The 2001–02 season was Arsenal Football Club's 10th season in the Premier League and their 76th consecutive season in the top flight of English football. Having ended the previous season as FA Cup finalists and league runners-up to Manchester United, the club went one better in this campaign, by completing the domestic double – their second in four years and third overall. Arsenal won the Premier League by a seven-point margin, were unbeaten away from home and managed the unique feat of scoring in every league game. They lost only three times in the division, all of which were at home. At the Millennium Stadium, Arsenal beat Chelsea 2–0 to win the 2002 FA Cup Final. In Europe however, they fared poorly as they were eliminated in the second group stage of the UEFA Champions League.

In the transfer window, Arsenal sold several fringe players, notably Nelson Vivas to Internazionale and Sylvinho to Celta Vigo; goalkeeper John Lukic was released following his decision to retire. Goalkeeper Richard Wright was signed as an earmarked understudy to David Seaman, while midfielder Giovanni van Bronckhorst and striker Francis Jeffers were purchased in big money moves from Rangers and Everton respectively. Perhaps the most marked signing for Arsenal was the acquisition of defender Sol Campbell, who moved from local rivals Tottenham Hotspur on a free transfer.

Manager Arsène Wenger was named Barclaycard Manager of the Year and midfielder Freddie Ljungberg received the player equivalent – the Barclaycard Player of the Year, in recognition of the team's achievement. Winger Robert Pires was given the accolade of being the Football Writers' Association Footballer of the Year, while Thierry Henry ended the campaign as club and the league's top goalscorer, the latter for which he was awarded the Premier League Golden Boot. At the end of the season, club captain Tony Adams announced his retirement from football after almost 20 years at the club; he was followed by fellow defender Lee Dixon and club goalkeeping coach Bob Wilson.

== Background ==
In the 2000–01 season, Arsenal finished second in the Premier League for the third consecutive season – this time ten points behind Manchester United. The title race was as good as over by February, when Arsenal lost 6–1 to United at Old Trafford. The season gave priority to cups, with the best chance of ending their three-year wait for a trophy being in the FA Cup; Arsenal beat Tottenham Hotspur in the semi-finals and met Liverpool in the final. Although they dominated most of the match and went a goal up, they succumbed to two late Michael Owen goals and lost 2–1.

=== Transfers ===
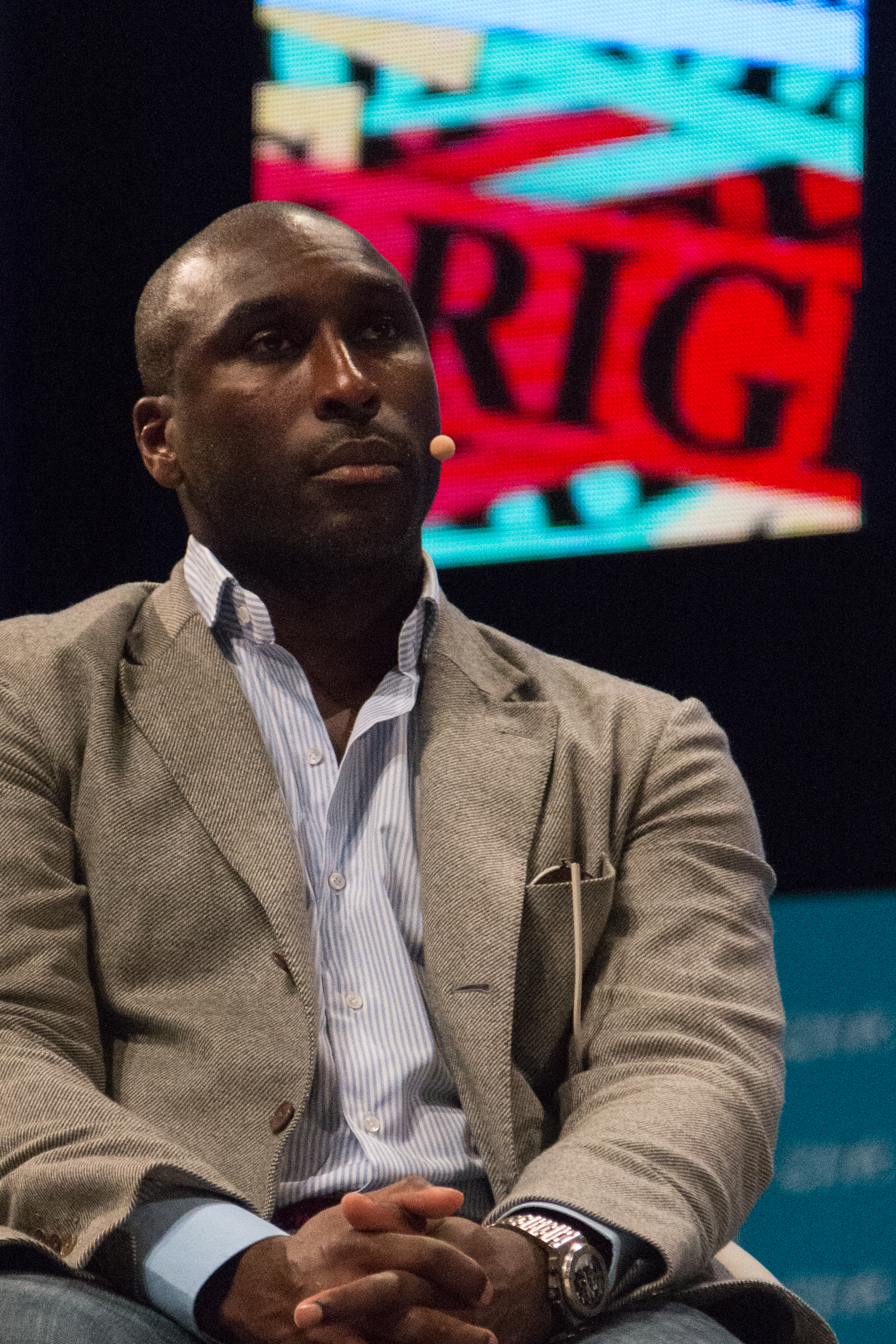
Defender Sol Campbell joined Arsenal from rivals Tottenham Hotspur in the transfer window.

The cup final defeat prompted manager Arsène Wenger to admit new players would be brought in during the transfer window. To fill the seemingly large void left by Emmanuel Petit in the centre of midfield, Giovanni van Bronckhorst was signed from Rangers for £8.5 million. Teenager Francis Jeffers was purchased from Everton in an initial £8 million deal. Junichi Inamoto and Richard Wright were also recruited, with Nelson Vivas and Sylvinho departing the club. After a protracted transfer saga, which involved him questioning Arsenal's ambitions and being linked to a move with Manchester United, midfielder Patrick Vieira remained at the club.

Perhaps the marked signing of the summer was defender Sol Campbell, who moved from rivals Tottenham Hotspur on a Bosman ruling. The player's wage demands seemed to have extinguished Arsenal's chances of signing the player at one point. Campbell was unveiled at a midday news conference on 3 July 2001, which journalists "presumed had been called to announce goalkeeper Richard Wright's arrival from Ipswich." Wenger described Campbell as the "best", adding: "I felt we could not compete on financial basis with the top clubs but we could give him a football challenge."

==== In ====
No.	Position	Player	Transferred from	Fee	Date	Ref
57	DF	Juan	São Paulo	Undisclosed	1 May 2001	
9	FW	Francis Jeffers	Everton	£10,000,000	14 June 2001	
16	MF	Giovanni van Bronckhorst	Rangers	£8,500,000	19 June 2001	
23	DF	Sol Campbell	Tottenham Hotspur	Free transfer	3 July 2001	
24	GK	Richard Wright	Ipswich Town	£6,000,000	5 July 2001	
19	MF	Junichi Inamoto	Gamba Osaka	£3,500,000	23 July 2001	
27	DF	Stathis Tavlaridis	Iraklis	£1,000,000	19 September 2001	
28	DF	Kolo Touré	ASEC Mimosas	£150,000	14 February 2002	

==== Out ====
No.	Position	Player	Transferred to	Fee	Date	Ref
40	DF	Lee Canoville	Torquay United	Free transfer	1 June 2001	
24	GK	John Lukic	Retired	Free transfer	1 June 2001	
23	DF	Nelson Vivas	Internazionale	Free transfer	12 June 2001	
19	MF	Stefan Malz	Kaiserslautern	£580,000	24 June 2001	
27	MF	Guillaume Norbert	Lorient	Free transfer	25 July 2001	
26	MF	Guy Demel	Borussia Dortmund	£194,000	25 July 2001	
16	DF	Sylvinho	Celta Vigo	£5,000,000	31 August 2001	
44	MF	Greg Lincoln	Stevenage Borough	Free transfer	1 September 2001	

== Pre-season ==
Arsenal kicked off their pre-season in England playing, and beating both Boreham Wood, and Rushden & Diamonds, before flying to Austria to play a series of friendlies against Turkish club, Kocaelispor, Spanish side Real Mallorca, and Italian champions, Roma, with mixed results. Both Sol Campbell and Richard Wright made their debuts for the club in the 2–0 win against Real Mallorca. Returning to England they won games against Norwich City., and Barnet, before the commencement of the Premier League.

=== Results ===
13 July 2001 Friendly	Boreham Wood	0–2	Arsenal	Borehamwood
		Report	Jeffers; Bergkamp	Stadium: Meadow Park (Borehamwood)

21 July 2001 Friendly	Rushden & Diamonds	0–2	Arsenal	Northampton
		Report	Henry 69'; Volz 88'	Stadium: Nene Park; Attendance: 6,071

25 July 2001 Friendly	Kocaelispor	4–1	Arsenal	Innsbruck, Austria
	Lazarov; Colak; Topraktepe	Report	Parlour

30 July 2001 Friendly	Real Mallorca	0–2	Arsenal	Kufstein, Austria
		Report	Bergkamp; Van Bronckhorst

1 August 2001 Friendly	Roma	1–0	Arsenal	Austria
	Vincenzo Montella 45'	Report		Attendance: 10,000

7 August 2001 Friendly	Norwich City	2–4	Arsenal	Norwich, England
		Report	Patrick Vieira; Sylvain Wiltord; Francis Jeffers	Stadium: Carrow Road; Attendance: 21,000

11 August 2001 Friendly	Barnet	1–6	Arsenal	Barnet, England
	Midgley 55'	Report	Ljungberg 26'; Cole 34'; Bergkamp 38'; Henry 68'; Vieira; Wiltord 83'	Stadium: Underhill Stadium; Attendance: 4,600

=== Tony Adams Testimonial ===
Following his announcement of retirement, a testimonial match was organised for Tony Adams at the end of the season, against the Scottish football champions, Celtic, on 13 May, at Highbury. The match played out as a 1–1 draw, with Lee Dixon scoring the singular Arsenal goal.

13 May 2002 Tony Adams Testimonial	Arsenal	1–1	Celtic	London
	Dixon 67'	Report	Thompson 32'	Stadium: Highbury; Attendance: 38,021

== Premier League ==
=== August–October ===
"I saw something today I never saw last season – we played as a team. It's the most important thing in football."

— Thierry Henry's reaction following the Middlesbrough game.

Arsenal's league campaign started on 18 August 2001, with an away fixture at Middlesbrough. Thierry Henry scored the opening goal in the 43rd minute, before teammate Ray Parlour was sent off in the second half for a second bookable offence. In spite of the man disadvantage, Arsenal was awarded a late penalty which was converted in by Robert Pires – it was conceded by Ugo Ehiogu for a trip on Ashley Cole, who subsequently was sent off. Substitute Dennis Bergkamp added two goals in two minutes, in what finished a 4–0 victory. At home to Leeds United, Arsenal conceded within the half-hour after Ian Harte's "low, left-footed free-kick" beat goalkeeper Seaman. Although Sylvain Wiltord equalised moments after, striker Mark Viduka in the second half collected a pass from Harry Kewell and used his strength to beat Tony Adams and score for the visitors. In spite of an attacking formation change and Leeds going down to nine men, as Danny Mills and Lee Bowyer were dismissed, Arsenal was unable to break down their defence. Goals from Ljungberg, Wiltord, Henry and Kanu against Leicester City moved Arsenal into third place, a point behind joint-leaders Everton and Leeds.

The team could only manage a draw against Chelsea on 8 September 2001, in a game described by The Guardian writer David Lacey as one where "the teams simply battered away at each other until one cracked." Henry scored the winning goal away to newly promoted outfit Fulham; the 3–1 victory moved Arsenal to the top of the league for the first time in the campaign. Against Bolton Wanderers, Arsenal was held to a 1–1 draw after Jeffers' goal was cancelled out by Michael Ricketts. A win at Derby County, where Henry scored two goals was followed by an identical scoreline against Southampton at the new St. Mary's Stadium. At home to Blackburn Rovers, midfielder Keith Gillespie gave the visitors the lead, before Pires equalised and Bergkamp put Arsenal in front. A mistake by Lauren presented David Dunn the chance to shoot "from 25 yards" and score. Henry's controlled effort looked to have been the winner for Arsenal, until a pass by Tugay caused goalkeeper Wright to "race out of his goal" – the loose ball was collected by Dunn who shot into the empty net. Although Wenger was disappointed with the manner of the defeat, he saw some encouragement: "What's positive for everyone is that Manchester United are dropping points as well. But we need to rectify the fact we concede goals at home." October ended with a draw against Sunderland, where notably former Arsenal player Stefan Schwarz equalised for the home side and Patrick Vieira missed a penalty.

=== November–February ===
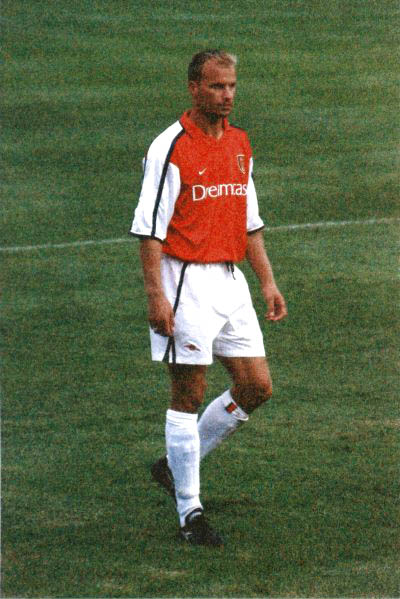
Bergkamp scored the winning goal for Arsenal against Blackburn Rovers in January 2002.

Arsenal's first fixture of November was at home to Charlton Athletic. The team conceded four goals in 20 minutes and blew several chances to "kill the game", in what was the club's biggest home defeat in the league under Wenger. An away trip to local rivals Tottenham Hostpur became magnified with interest, given it marked the return of Campbell following his move to Arsenal. An 81st-minute goal scored by Pires put Arsenal into the lead, before a lapse by Wright in goal allowed Gus Poyet's shot to squirm from his grasp and enter the goalnet. Arsenal then faced league champions Manchester United and in spite of conceding inside 14 minutes through a Paul Scholes’ strike, Ljungberg equalised for them "with a wonderful chipped finish, following Gary Neville's wretched error." Arsenal improved in the second half but scored in unforeseen fashion: United goalkeeper Fabien Barthez passed the ball directly into the feet of Henry, who profited from the error and scored. Five minutes later, Barthez's failure to grasp the ball presented Henry the chance to score his second, which he did. Both Henry and Wenger defended the opposition goalkeeper, with the former, his international teammate saying: "Of course I was happy to score the goals but it was strange. He's my good friend and I feel sorry for him; I would rather have got them another way."

Arsenal beat Ipswich Town on 1 December 2001 to put the club second in the league table. A week later the team played Aston Villa,. Goals from ex-Arsenal midfielder Paul Merson and Steve Stone gave the visitors a deserved lead before Arsenal produced an "enthralling" fight back, capped off by Henry, who scored the winner in stoppage time. The team drew 1–1 at West Ham United and lost more ground at the top of the league table following a comprehensive home defeat to Newcastle United. Arsenal began the Christmas period with a fixture against Liverpool and the team were without Vieira, who was suspended. Striker Michael Owen thought he had scored his 100th goal for Liverpool, which was acrobatically cleared off the line by Cole. Vieira's replacement Giovanni van Bronckhorst was sent off in the 35th minute for a dive but the man disadvantage did not stop Arsenal "catching their opponents on the break". The team scored the first goal of the match – a penalty, converted by Henry minutes before the interval and "uncharacteristic slackness" by Steven Gerrard allowed Pires to beat his defender and cross the ball from the left-hand side; it was met by Ljungberg, who nipped in at the far post to double Arsenal's lead. Jari Litmanen pulled a goal back for Liverpool but Arsenal hung on to record their first win at Anfield in Wenger's tenure. On Boxing Day Arsenal recorded a win against Chelsea and two days after, earned three points at home to Middlesbrough, courtesy of a headed winner by Cole.

In their first league match of 2002, Arsenal hosted Liverpool at Highbury. The match brought "little but frustration" for the home side as Liverpool scored an equaliser six minutes after Ljungberg gave Arsenal the lead. More ground was lost and the initiative was handed to Manchester United, following a second successive stalemate in the league, this time away to Leeds on 20 January 2002. With results going in Arsenal's favour that midweek however, the club moved second in the table after a 3–1 win against Leicester City. Victory away to Blackburn Rovers, where Oleh Luzhnyi was sent off in the second half and his defensive partner Campbell "provided the sort of display usually described as sterling", kept Arsenal in-touch of Manchester United.

A Jo Tessem equaliser for Southampton earned the visitors a point against Arsenal on 2 February 2002; in hindsight this proved to be the last time they dropped points in the league season. Wiltord scored the winning goal against Everton and Arsenal moved back to second place, which was obtained by Liverpool, following a 4–1 win at home to Fulham.

=== March–May ===
Arsenal recorded a 2–0 win against Newcastle United on 2 March 2002. The opening goal scored by Bergkamp was described as a "really clever goal" by opposition manager Sir Bobby Robson. The move involved the striker receiving a low pass from Pires and under pressure from his marker Nikos Dabizas, he controlled the ball with one flick and went around before placing the ball into the right-hand corner. Arsenal moved to the top of the table three days after, as they beat Derby County by one goal to nil. They were displaced by Manchester United the following night, albeit with the reigning champions having played a game more. An inspired performance by Pires against Aston Villa on 17 March 2002 kept a point behind top spot; the win was followed up by a comprehensive defeat of Sunderland, where all three Arsenal goals were scored in the first half.

Henry scored a brace against Charlton Athletic to move Arsenal back to first spot, one clear of Liverpool with a game-in-hand. They then played Tottenham Hotspur on 6 April 2002 and took the lead in the opening half through Ljungberg, via a deflection off goalkeeper Kasey Keller. Teddy Sheringham equalised for Spurs from the penalty spot, before Arsenal was awarded a spot kick when Henry was adjusted to have been fouled by Dean Richards. With Henry receiving treatment and normal penalty takers Edu and Bergkamp substituted, Lauren stepped up to take the responsibility and scored what was the winner. Victory against Ipswich Town and five days later at home against West Ham United, where Ljungberg and Kanu scored meant Arsenal was two wins away from securing the title. The team beat Bolton Wanderers at the Reebok Stadium, which mathematically ruled out Liverpool's chances of winning the league and meant Manchester United needed to beat Arsenal the following game to have any chance of retaining it. Ruud van Nistelrooy was surprisingly named on the bench for Sir Alex Ferguson's side, with Arsenal missing Adams and Henry. Having withstood pressure from the home side in the first half, Wiltord scored for Arsenal in the second half, scoring off the rebound after a shot from Ljungberg was saved. The win secured the double for the second time in four seasons and prompted Wenger to acclaim a "shift of power" in the league. On the final day of the season, Arsenal beat Everton by four goals to three, in a match where defender Lee Dixon and goalkeeping coach Bob Wilson received warm send-offs from the crowd.

=== Match results ===
18 August 2001 1	Middlesbrough	0–4	Arsenal	Middlesbrough
15:00 BST		Report	Henry 43'; Pires 87' (pen.); Bergkamp 88', 90'	Stadium: Riverside Stadium; Attendance: 31,557; Referee: Graham Barber

21 August 2001 2	Arsenal	1–2	Leeds United	London
19:45 BST	Wiltord 32'	Report	Harte 29'; Viduka 52'	Stadium: Highbury; Attendance: 38,062; Referee: Jeff Winter

25 August 2001 3	Arsenal	4–0	Leicester City	London
15:00 BST	Ljungberg 17'; Wiltord 28'; Henry 77'; Kanu 90+4'	Report		Stadium: Highbury; Attendance: 37,909; Referee: Andy D'Urso

8 September 2001 4	Chelsea	1–1	Arsenal	London
15:00 BST	Hasselbaink 31' (pen.)	Report	Henry 17'	Stadium: Stamford Bridge; Attendance: 40,855; Referee: Mike Riley

15 September 2001 5	Fulham	1–3	Arsenal	London
15:00 BST	Malbranque 48'	Report	Ljungberg 17'; Henry 82'; Bergkamp 90+5'	Stadium: Craven Cottage; Attendance: 20,805; Referee: Alan Wiley

22 September 2001 6	Arsenal	1–1	Bolton Wanderers	London
15:00 BST	Jeffers 74'	Report	Ricketts 83'	Stadium: Highbury; Attendance: 38,014; Referee: Clive Wilkes

29 September 2001 7	Derby County	0–2	Arsenal	Derby
15:00 BST		Report	Henry 21', 63' (pen.)	Stadium: Pride Park Stadium; Attendance: 29,200; Referee: Rob Styles

13 October 2001 8	Southampton	0–2	Arsenal	Southampton
15:00 BST		Report	Pires 5'; Henry 74'	Stadium: St. Mary's Stadium; Attendance: 29,759; Referee: Graham Barber

20 October 2001 9	Arsenal	3–3	Blackburn Rovers	London
	Pires 48'; Bergkamp 53'; Henry 78'	Report	Gillespie 41'; Dunn 58', 89'	Stadium: Highbury; Attendance: 38,108; Referee: Uriah Rennie

27 October 2001 10	Sunderland	1–1	Arsenal	Sunderland
	Schwarz 54'	Report	Kanu 40'	Stadium: Stadium of Light; Attendance: 48,029; Referee: Mike Riley

4 November 2001 11	Arsenal	2–4	Charlton Athletic	London
	Henry 7', 60' (pen.)	Report	S. Brown 35'; R. Wright 43' (o.g.); Jensen 49'; Euell 53'	Stadium: Highbury; Attendance: 38,010; Referee: Mark Halsey

17 November 2001 12	Tottenham Hotspur	1–1	Arsenal	London
15:00 GMT	Poyet 90+4'	Report	Pires 81'	Stadium: White Hart Lane; Attendance: 36,049; Referee: Jeff Winter

25 November 2001 13	Arsenal	3–1	Manchester United	London
16:00 GMT	Ljungberg 48'; Henry 80', 85'	Report	Scholes 15'	Stadium: Highbury; Attendance: 38,174; Referee: Peter Jones

1 December 2001 14	Ipswich Town	0–2	Arsenal	Ipswich
		Report	Ljungberg 5'; Henry 56' (pen.)	Stadium: Portman Road; Attendance: 24,666; Referee: David Elleray

9 December 2001 15	Arsenal	3–2	Aston Villa	London
16:00 GMT	Wiltord 46'; Henry 72', 90+1'	Report	Merson 21'; Stone 34'	Stadium: Highbury; Attendance: 38,074; Referee: Alan Wiley

15 December 2001 16	West Ham United	1–1	Arsenal	London
15:00 GMT	Kanouté 36'	Report	Cole 39'	Stadium: Boleyn Ground; Attendance: 34,523; Referee: Mike Riley

18 December 2001 17	Arsenal	1–3	Newcastle United	London
20:00 GMT	Pires 20'	Report	O'Brien 60'; Shearer 86' (pen.); Robert 90+1'	Stadium: Highbury; Attendance: 38,012; Referee: Graham Poll

23 December 2001 18	Liverpool	1–2	Arsenal	Liverpool
16:00 GMT	Litmanen 55'	Report	Henry 45+2' (pen.); Ljungberg 53'	Stadium: Anfield; Attendance: 44,297; Referee: Paul Durkin

26 December 2001 19	Arsenal	2–1	Chelsea	London
	Campbell 49'; Wiltord 71'	Report	Lampard 31'	Stadium: Highbury; Attendance: 38,079; Referee: Graham Barber

29 December 2001 20	Arsenal	2–1	Middlesbrough	London
	Pires 55'; Cole 80'	Report	Whelan 22'	Stadium: Highbury; Attendance: 37,948; Referee: Andy D'Urso

13 January 2002 21	Arsenal	1–1	Liverpool	London
16:00 GMT	Ljungberg 62'	Report	Riise 68'	Stadium: Highbury; Attendance: 38,132; Referee: Steve Dunn

20 January 2002 22	Leeds United	1–1	Arsenal	Leeds
16:00 GMT	Fowler 6'	Report	Pires 45'	Stadium: Elland Road; Attendance: 40,143; Referee: Mark Halsey

23 January 2002 23	Leicester City	1–3	Arsenal	Leicester
19:45 GMT	Izzet 68'	Report	Van Bronckhorst 33'; Henry 43'; Wiltord 90+4'	Stadium: Filbert Street; Attendance: 21,344; Referee: David Elleray

30 January 2002 24	Blackburn Rovers	2–3	Arsenal	Blackburn
19:45 GMT	Jansen 31', 39'	Report	Bergkamp 14', 75'; Henry 21'	Stadium: Ewood Park; Attendance: 25,893; Referee: Dermot Gallagher

2 February 2002 25	Arsenal	1–1	Southampton	London
15:00 GMT	Wiltord 40'	Report	Tessem 80'	Stadium: Highbury; Attendance: 38,024; Referee: Clive Wilkes

10 February 2002 26	Everton	0–1	Arsenal	Liverpool
16:00 GMT		Report	Wiltord 62'	Stadium: Goodison Park; Attendance: 30,859; Referee: Jeff Winter

23 February 2002 27	Arsenal	4–1	Fulham	London
15:00 GMT	Lauren 5'; Vieira 15'; Henry 38', 59'	Report	Marlet 10'	Stadium: Highbury; Attendance: 38,029; Referee: Uriah Rennie

2 March 2002 28	Newcastle United	0–2	Arsenal	Newcastle upon Tyne
17:30 GMT		Report	Bergkamp 11'; Campbell 41'	Stadium: St. James' Park; Attendance: 52,067; Referee: Neale Barry

5 March 2002 29	Arsenal	1–0	Derby County	London
19:45 GMT	Pires 69'	Report		Stadium: Highbury; Attendance: 37,878; Referee: Graham Barber

17 March 2002 30	Aston Villa	1–2	Arsenal	Birmingham
16:00 GMT	Dublin 69'	Report	Edu 15'; Pires 60'	Stadium: Villa Park; Attendance: 41,520; Referee: Steve Dunn

30 March 2002 31	Arsenal	3–0	Sunderland	London
15:00 BST	Vieira 2'; Bergkamp 4'; Wiltord 30'	Report		Stadium: Highbury; Attendance: 38,047; Referee: Paul Durkin

1 April 2002 32	Charlton Athletic	0–3	Arsenal	London
15:00 BST		Report	Henry 16', 25'; Ljungberg 21'	Stadium: The Valley; Attendance: 26,339; Referee: Andy D'Urso

6 April 2002 33	Arsenal	2–1	Tottenham Hotspur	London
15:00 BST	Ljungberg 24'; Lauren 86' (pen.)	Report	Sheringham 81' (pen.)	Stadium: Highbury; Attendance: 38,186; Referee: Mark Halsey

21 April 2002 34	Arsenal	2–0	Ipswich Town	London
16:00 BST	Ljungberg 68', 78'	Report		Stadium: Highbury; Attendance: 38,058; Referee: Alan Wiley

24 April 2002 35	Arsenal	2–0	West Ham United	London
20:00 BST	Ljungberg 77'; Kanu 80'	Report		Stadium: Highbury; Attendance: Steve Dunn; Referee: 38,038

29 April 2002 36	Bolton Wanderers	0–2	Arsenal	Bolton
20:00 BST		Report	Ljungberg 36'; Wiltord 44'	Stadium: Reebok Stadium; Attendance: 27,351; Referee: Dermot Gallagher

8 May 2002 37	Manchester United	0–1	Arsenal	Manchester
20:00 BST		Report	Wiltord 57'	Stadium: Old Trafford; Attendance: 67,580; Referee: Paul Durkin

11 May 2002 38	Arsenal	4–3	Everton	London
15:00 BST	Bergkamp 4'; Henry 33', 72'; Jeffers 82'	Report	Carsley 20'; Radzinski 31'; Watson 89'	Stadium: Highbury; Attendance: 38,254; Referee: Mark Halsey

=== Partial league table ===
Pos	Team	Pld	W	D	L	GF	GA	GD	Pts	Qualification or relegation
1	Arsenal (C)	38	26	9	3	79	36	+43	87	Qualification for the Champions League first group stage
2	Liverpool	38	24	8	6	67	30	+37	80	Qualification for the Champions League first group stage
3	Manchester United	38	24	5	9	87	45	+42	77	Qualification for the Champions League third qualifying round
4	Newcastle United	38	21	8	9	74	52	+22	71	Qualification for the Champions League third qualifying round
5	Leeds United	38	18	12	8	53	37	+16	66	Qualification for the UEFA Cup first round (Note: Since Arsenal qualified for the Champions League, their UEFA Cup place as FA Cup winners defaulted to Chelsea, the losing finalists.)

Source: Premier League
Rules for classification: 1) points; 2) goal difference; 3) number of goals scored.
(C) Champions

==== Results summary ====
Overall								Home						Away					
Pld	W	D	L	GF	GA	GD	Pts	W	D	L	GF	GA	GD	W	D	L	GF	GA	GD
38	26	9	3	79	36	+43	87	12	4	3	42	25	+17	14	5	0	37	11	+26

==== Results by round ====
Round	1	2	3	4	5	6	7	8	9	10	11	12	13	14	15	16	17	18	19	20	21	22	23	24	25	26	27	28	29	30	31	32	33	34	35	36	37	38
Ground	A	H	H	A	A	H	A	A	H	A	H	A	H	A	H	A	H	A	H	H	H	A	A	A	H	A	H	A	H	A	H	A	H	H	H	A	A	H
Result	W	L	W	D	W	D	W	W	D	D	L	D	W	W	W	D	L	W	W	W	D	D	W	W	D	W	W	W	W	W	W	W	W	W	W	W	W	W
Position	2	4	3	4	1	2	1	2	1	3	5	5	3	2	2	2	3	2	2	1	4	4	2	2	3	4	2	2	1	2	3	1	1	1	1	1	1	1

A = Away; H = Home; W = Win; D = Draw; L = Loss

== FA Cup ==
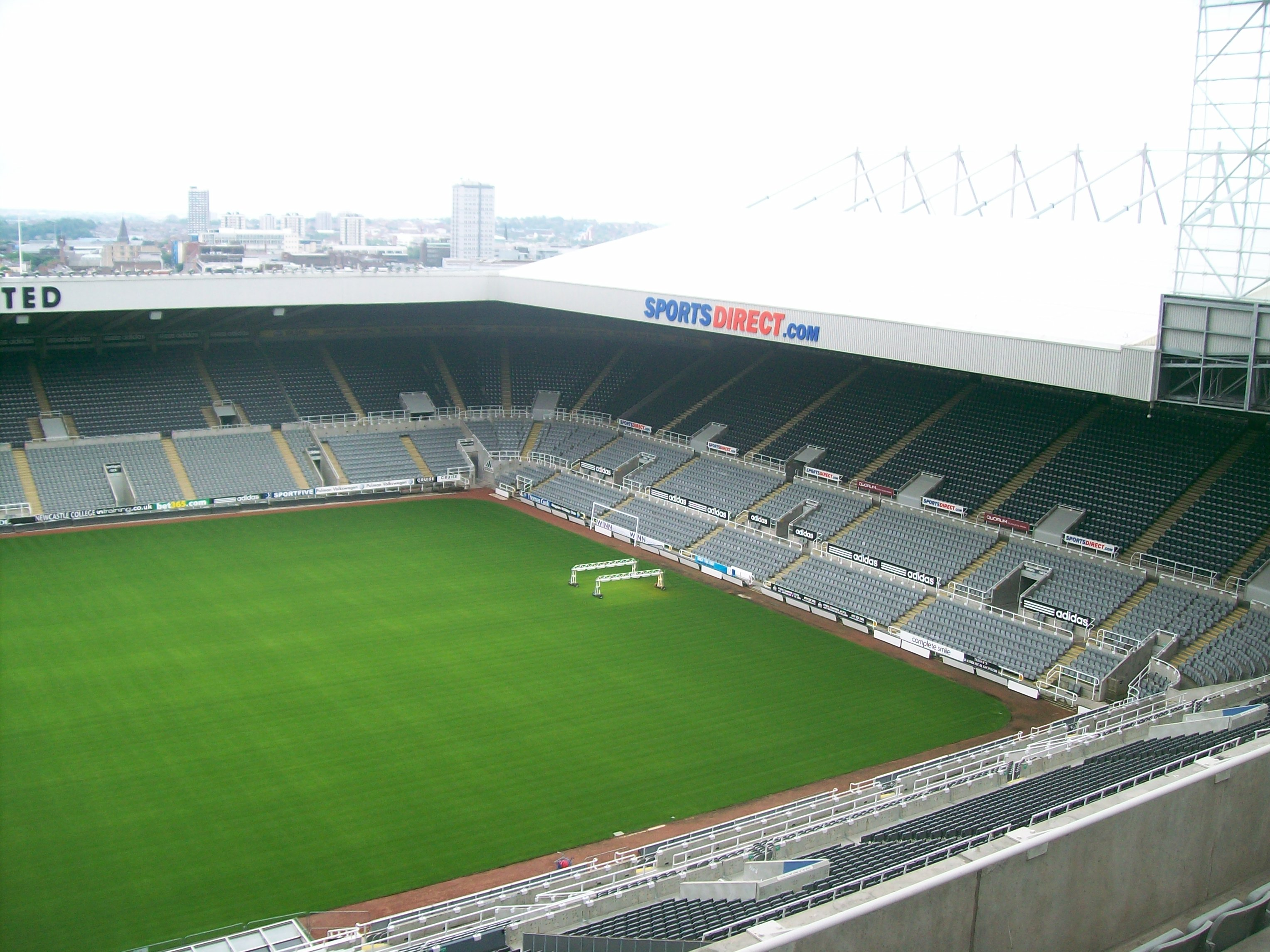
St James' Park, where Arsenal played their sixth round tie against Newcastle United.

Arsenal entered the FA Cup in the third round, in which they were drawn to play Watford of the First Division. They took the lead in the eighth minute, where good play by Kanu allowed Henry to round goalkeeper Alec Chamberlain and tap the ball into the net. The lead was doubled two minutes later: Kanu again found Henry, who "unselfishly squared the ball to midfielder Freddie Ljungberg for another tap-in." Gifton Noel-Williams moments afterwards halved the lead, when Arsenal failed to deal with a corner; Noel-Williams headed the ball in from a Gary Fisken cross. After squandering numerous chances to increase their lead, Arsenal added a late third and fourth goal from Kanu and Bergkamp before Marcus Gayle scored what was a mere consolation for Watford in stoppage time. Arsenal faced cup holders Liverpool the following round, whom they lost to in the 2001 FA Cup Final. A solitary goal scored by Bergkamp in the 27th minute was enough for Arsenal to progress, in a match layered with controversy: Martin Keown, Bergkamp and Liverpool's Jamie Carragher were sent off in the space of ten minutes – the latter footballer for hurling back a coin at the crowd. Against Gillingham in the fifth round, Arsenal twice had their lead cancelled out, before Adams, making his long-awaited return, scored the match-winning goal.

Arsenal played league challengers Newcastle United in the sixth round, on 9 March 2002. The timing of the game, influenced by the television schedulers, angered Wenger, who threatened to field a weakened side, to prioritise on their Champions League progress: "The BBC have put us in this position of playing at 5.35pm on Saturday night instead of a noon kick-off. I don't know whether Newcastle would have played the game earlier on the Saturday but what can I do about the BBC? I feel it's being very unfair as we are the only side left in all three competitions." It was the second meeting between both teams in a week, and in spite of Arsenal winning the first fixture and scoring the opener in the cup tie, Newcastle found "new reserves of energy and determination" to draw level and created numerous opportunities to win the game outright. With the game ending in a draw, a replay was scheduled two weeks later. Arsenal won 3–0, but more concerningly lost Pires, who was carried off and subsequently ruled out for the remainder of the season with medial knee ligament damage. An own goal by Middlesbrough's Gianluca Festa, from an Henry free-kick in the semi-finals was enough to send Arsenal to their 15th FA Cup final.

=== Final ===
Arsenal contested the final against Chelsea on 4 May 2002. Wenger recalled Seaman in goal from the previous fixture, in place of Wright while Campbell was paired up with Adams in central defence. For Chelsea, Jimmy Floyd Hasselbaink and Graeme Le Saux passed late fitness tests and were named in the first team; John Terry filled the substitutes bench, having woken up with a virus. Chelsea threatened early with goal efforts from Le Saux and midfielder Frank Lampard, before Bergkamp fashioned the first real chance of the match – he headed the ball over the top, which caught goalkeeper Carlo Cudicini off his line. In the 70th minute Arsenal took the lead: Adams found Wiltord in space, who in turn passed the ball towards Parlour – he kicked "from just beyond the arc", which flew into the top right corner. Ten minutes after, Ljungberg increased the lead, running from the half-way line and shrung off a late challenge by Terry to curl the ball past Cudicini. The win meant Arsenal completed one half of an expected double; Wenger was pleased with the team's performance, adding: "We were very frustrated last year. We have shown a lot of strength to come back here – beating Liverpool and Newcastle on the way."

5 January 2002 Third round	Watford	2–4	Arsenal	Watford
12:00	Noel-Williams 13'; Gayle 90'	Report	Henry 8'; Ljungberg 10'; Kanu 83'; Bergkamp 85'	Stadium: Vicarage Road; Attendance: 20,105; Referee: Alan Wiley

27 January 2002 Fourth round	Arsenal	1–0	Liverpool	London
13:00	Bergkamp 27'	Report		Stadium: Highbury; Attendance: 38,092; Referee: Mike Riley

16 February 2002 Fifth round	Arsenal	5–2	Gillingham	London
15:00	Wiltord 38', 81'; Kanu 50'; Adams 67'; Parlour 88'	Report	King 38'; Gooden 54'	Stadium: Highbury; Attendance: 38,003; Referee: Andy D'Urso

9 March 2002 Sixth round	Newcastle United	1–1	Arsenal	Newcastle
17:35	Robert 52'	Report	Edu 14'	Stadium: St. James' Park; Attendance: 51,027; Referee: Mark Halsey

23 March 2002 Sixth round replay	Arsenal	3–0	Newcastle United	London
12:00	Pires 2'; Bergkamp 9'; Campbell 50'	Report		Stadium: Highbury; Attendance: 38,073; Referee: Uriah Rennie

14 April 2002 Semi-final	Middlesbrough	0–1	Arsenal	Manchester
16:00 BST		Report	Festa 39' (o.g.)	Stadium: Old Trafford; Attendance: 61,168; Referee: David Elleray

4 May 2002 Final	Arsenal	2–0	Chelsea	Cardiff
15:00 BST	Parlour 70'; Ljungberg 80'	Report		Stadium: Millennium Stadium; Attendance: 73,963; Referee: Mike Riley

== Football League Cup ==
In the third round of the Football League Cup, Arsenal faced Manchester United at Highbury. With both teams playing league fixtures the day before — compounded by television commitments, United's fixture congestion and an upcoming international break — resulting in the managers making several first team changes to give their younger and fringe players game time, it was Arsenal who came out on top, with Wiltord scoring a hat-trick in a 4–0 win. A 2–0 win against First Division outfit Grimsby Town, who knocked out competition holders Liverpool in the previous round followed, but Arsenal was eliminated in the fifth round, losing 4–0 to Blackburn Rovers on 11 December 2001. Wenger shrugged off the significance of the defeat and suggested that a spot in Europe, given to the winners of the competition, should instead be allocated to the Premier League: "I would give one more place to the championship because it's more difficult to play in the championship. But, as long as there is a European place at stake, we will play in the competition."

5 November 2001 Third round	Arsenal	4–0	Manchester United	London
19:45	Wiltord 14', 29', 46'; Kanu 65'	Report		Stadium: Highbury; Attendance: 30,693; Referee: Mike Riley

27 November 2001 Fourth round	Arsenal	2–0	Grimsby Town	London
19:45	Edu 4'; Wiltord 74'	Report		Stadium: Highbury; Attendance: 16,917; Referee: Dermot Gallagher

11 December 2001 Fifth round	Blackburn Rovers	4–0	Arsenal	Blackburn
19:45	Jansen 11', 15', 68'; Hughes 21'	Report		Stadium: Ewood Park; Attendance: 13,278; Referee: Paul Durkin

== UEFA Champions League ==
=== Group stage ===
Arsenal's qualification into the UEFA Champions League was ensured as league runners-up the previous season. The club were drawn in Group B, along with German opposition Schalke 04, Panathinaikos of Greece and Spain's Mallorca. In the opening match against Mallorca on 11 September 2001, Cole was handed a straight red card, as he was adjudged to have brought down striker Albert Luque in the penalty box. Vicente Engonga scored from the resulting penalty, which proved to be the winning goal, in spite of Wenger making attacking substitutions that threatened to go close. A 3–2 victory against Schalke 04, where Henry scored two goals was followed by a defeat away to Panathinaikos. In the reverse fixture, Arsenal held on to win 2–1, and secured their passage to the second group stage with a 3–1 victory over Mallorca. With nothing to play for, Wenger fielded an understrength Arsenal team against Schalke 04, who "...produced next to nothing in attack, looked poor in defence and were beaten by the time Sylvain Wiltord scored from Ray Parlour's cross."

Pos	Team	Pld	W	D	L	GF	GA	GD	Pts	Qualification
1	(Greece) Panathinaikos	6	4	0	2	8	3	+5	12	Advance to second group stage
2	(England) Arsenal	6	3	0	3	9	9	0	9	Advance to second group stage
3	(Spain) Mallorca	6	3	0	3	4	9	−5	9	Transfer to UEFA Cup
4	(Germany) Schalke 04	6	2	0	4	9	9	0	6	

Source: RSSSF

11 September 2001 1	Mallorca (Spain)	1–0	(England) Arsenal	Mallorca, Spain
20:45 CET	Engonga 12' (pen.); Olaizola (yellow card) 32'; Niño (yellow card) 53'; Vicente (yellow card) 90+1'	Report	Cole (red card) 11'; Pires (yellow card) 23'; Henry (yellow card) 63'	Stadium: Son Moix; Referee: Knud Erik Fisker (Denmark)

19 September 2001 2	Arsenal (England)	3–2	(Germany) Schalke 04	London, England
19:45 BST	Ljungberg 33'; Henry 36', 47' (pen.)	Report	Van Hoogdalem 43' (yellow card) 85'; Mpenza 59'; Hajto (yellow card) 60'; Agali (yellow card) 61'; Asamoah (yellow card) 90+3'	Stadium: Highbury; Referee: Claude Colombo (France)

26 September 2001 3	Panathinaikos (Greece)	1–0	(England) Arsenal	Athens, Greece
20:45 CET	Karagounis 25'	Report		Stadium: Leoforos Alexandras Stadium; Referee: Vítor Melo Pereira (Portugal)

16 October 2001 4	Arsenal (England)	2–1	(Greece) Panathinaikos	London, England
19:45 BST	Henry 23', 52' (pen.); Upson (yellow card) 28'; Vieira (yellow card) 32'; Lauren (yellow card) 53'; Cole (yellow card) 74'	Report	Sousa (yellow card) 13'; Kyrgiakos (yellow card) 47'; Olisadebe 50'; Michaelsen (yellow card) 80'	Stadium: Highbury; Referee: Urs Meier (Switzerland)

24 October 2001 5	Arsenal (England)	3–1	(Spain) Mallorca	London, England
19:45 BST	Pires 61'; Bergkamp 63'; Henry 90+3'	Report	Akyel (yellow card) 41'; Novo 74'	Stadium: Highbury; Referee: Dick Jol (Netherlands)

30 October 2001 6	Schalke 04 (Germany)	3–1	(England) Arsenal	Gelsenkirchen, Germany
20:45 CET	Mulder 2' (yellow card) 80'; Böhme (yellow card) 17'; Matellán (yellow card) 27'; Vermant 60'; Möller 64'	Report	Luzhnyi (red card) 17'; Edu (yellow card) 19'; Wiltord 71'	Stadium: Parkstadion; Referee: Ryszard Wojcik (Poland)

=== Second group stage ===
First half goals scored by Roy Makaay and Diego Tristán inflicted defeat for Arsenal in their opening group game against Deportivo La Coruña. The team responded with a 3–1 win against Italian champions Juventus; Ljungberg's second goal of the match and Arsenal's third involved a "wonderful piece of individual skill" by Bergkamp, as he held off two markers, before twisting and turning to find the Swede. What looked to be a priceless win against Bayer Leverkusen at the BayArena as Arsenal for much of the second half were down to ten men, in fact turned into a draw, as Ulf Kirsten scored in stoppage time to cancel out Pires' 56th-minute goal. In spite of winning the reverse fixture, defeat at home to Deportivo La Coruña and away at Juventus meant Arsenal finished third in the group with seven points.

Pos	Team	Pld	W	D	L	GF	GA	GD	Pts	Qualification
1	(Germany) Bayer Leverkusen	6	3	1	2	11	11	0	10	Advance to knockout stage
2	(Spain) Deportivo La Coruña	6	3	1	2	7	6	+1	10	Advance to knockout stage
3	(England) Arsenal	6	2	1	3	8	8	0	7	
4	(Italy) Juventus	6	2	1	3	7	8	−1	7	

Source: RSSSF

21 November 2001 1	Deportivo La Coruña (Spain)	2–0	(England) Arsenal	A Coruña, Spain
20:45 CET	Makaay 9'; Tristán 25'; Víctor (yellow card) 26'	Report	Henry (yellow card) 37'; Lauren (yellow card) 60'; Upson (yellow card) 80'	Stadium: Estadio Riazor; Referee: Terje Hauge (Football Association of Norway)

4 December 2001 2	Arsenal (England)	3–1	(Italy) Juventus	London, England
19:45 GMT	Ljungberg 21', 88'; Henry 28'; Kanu (yellow card) 65'	Report	Nedvěd (yellow card) 33'; Birindelli (yellow card) 39'; Trezeguet 49'	Stadium: Highbury; Referee: Vítor Melo Pereira (Portugal)

19 February 2002 3	Bayer Leverkusen (Germany)	1–1	(England) Arsenal	Leverkusen, Germany
20:45 CET	Živković (yellow card) 70'; Kirsten 90'	Report	Stepanovs (yellow card) 33'; Pires 56'; Parlour (yellow card) 41' (yellow-red card) 68'	Stadium: BayArena; Referee: Alain Sars (France)

27 February 2002 4	Arsenal (England)	4–1	(Germany) Bayer Leverkusen	London, England
19:45 GMT	Pires 5'; Henry 7'; Vieira 48'; Bergkamp 83'	Report	Ballack (yellow card) 47'; Živković (yellow card) 71'; Ramelow (yellow card) 72'; Sebescen 86'	Stadium: Highbury; Referee: Alain Hamer (Luxembourg)

12 March 2002 5	Arsenal (England)	0–2	(Spain) Deportivo La Coruña	London, England
19:45 GMT	Henry (penalty missed) 66'; Vieira (yellow card) 77'	Report	Valerón 30'; Naybet 40'; Víctor (yellow card) 44'; Sergio (yellow card) 69'; Scaloni (yellow card) 75'; Molina (yellow card) 82'; Capdevila (yellow card) 89'	Stadium: Highbury; Referee: Urs Meier (Switzerland)

20 March 2002 6	Juventus (Italy)	1–0	(England) Arsenal	Turin, Italy
20:45 CET	Davids (yellow card) 43'; Zalayeta 76'; Pessotto (yellow card) 90+1'	Report	Vieira (yellow card) 27'	Stadium: Stadio delle Alpi; Attendance: 9,000; Referee: Karl-Erik Nilsson (Sweden)

== Awards ==
In recognition of the team's achievement, Wenger was awarded the Barclaycard Manager of the Year, in addition to being named the League Managers Association Manager of the Year. Ljungberg, who scored in five of Arsenal's last eight league matches, as well as the second goal in the cup final, was given the Barclaycard Player of the Year accolade. Pires was named the Football Writers' Association Footballer of the Year, with five votes separating himself from Ruud van Nistelrooy; he said it was "a great honour" to receive the award, adding: "Times have been difficult with my injury, but this has given me something to smile about."

For his goal against Newcastle United, Bergkamp received the Goal of the Season award, as voted by viewers of ITV's The Premiership. Henry earned the Premier League Golden Boot, scoring 24 league goals – one more than van Nistelrooy, while Paul Burgess was named "Premier League Groundsman of the Year".

== Player statistics ==
No.	Pos	Nat	Player	Total		Premier League		FA Cup		League Cup		Champions League	
No.	Pos	Nat	Player	Apps	Goals	Apps	Goals	Apps	Goals	Apps	Goals	Apps	Goals
1	GK	(England) ENG	David Seaman	25	0	17+0	0	1+0	0	0+0	0	7+0	0
2	DF	(England) ENG	Lee Dixon	19	0	3+10	0	2+2	0	0+0	0	2+0	0
3	DF	(England) ENG	Ashley Cole	40	2	29+0	2	4+0	0	0+0	0	6+1	0
4	MF	(France) FRA	Patrick Vieira	54	3	35+1	2	7+0	0	0+0	0	11+0	1
5	DF	(England) ENG	Martin Keown	34	0	21+1	0	3+1	0	2+0	0	4+2	0
6	DF	(England) ENG	Tony Adams	13	1	10+0	0	3+0	1	0+0	0	0+0	0
7	MF	(France) FRA	Robert Pires	45	13	27+1	9	3+2	1	0+0	0	12+0	3
8	MF	(Sweden) SWE	Freddie Ljungberg	39	17	24+1	12	5+0	2	0+0	0	8+1	3
9	FW	(England) ENG	Francis Jeffers	10	2	2+4	2	1+1	0	0+0	0	0+2	0
10	FW	(Netherlands) NED	Dennis Bergkamp	46	14	22+11	9	4+2	3	1+0	0	3+3	2
11	FW	(France) FRA	Sylvain Wiltord	54	17	23+10	10	6+1	2	3+0	4	9+2	1
12	DF	(Cameroon) CMR	Lauren	41	2	27+0	2	3+0	0	0+0	0	11+0	0
13	GK	(England) ENG	Stuart Taylor	15	0	9+1	0	1+0	0	2+0	0	1+1	0
14	FW	(France) FRA	Thierry Henry	49	32	31+2	24	4+1	1	0+0	0	11+0	7
15	MF	(England) ENG	Ray Parlour	40	2	25+2	0	2+2	2	1+0	0	5+3	0
16	MF	(Netherlands) NED	Giovanni van Bronckhorst	33	1	13+8	1	2+0	0	3+0	0	6+1	0
17	MF	(Brazil) BRA	Edu	27	3	8+6	1	4+1	1	3+0	1	2+3	0
18	DF	(France) FRA	Gilles Grimandi	40	0	11+15	0	1+3	0	2+0	0	5+3	0
19	MF	(Japan) JPN	Junichi Inamoto	4	0	0+0	0	0+0	0	2+0	0	0+2	0
20	DF	(England) ENG	Matthew Upson	22	0	10+4	0	0+1	0	1+0	0	5+1	0
21	MF	(England) ENG	Jermaine Pennant [R]	5	0	0+0	0	0+0	0	3+0	0	0+2	0
22	DF	(Ukraine) UKR	Oleh Luzhnyi	26	0	15+3	0	4+0	0	1+0	0	3+0	0
23	DF	(England) ENG	Sol Campbell	48	3	29+2	2	7+0	1	0+0	0	10+0	0
24	GK	(England) ENG	Richard Wright	22	0	12+0	0	5+0	0	1+0	0	4+0	0
25	FW	(Nigeria) NGA	Nwankwo Kanu	39	6	9+14	3	3+2	2	2+0	1	4+5	0
26	DF	(Latvia) LVA	Igors Stepanovs	14	0	6+0	0	1+0	0	2+1	0	3+1	0
27	DF	(Greece) GRE	Stathis Tavlaridis [R]	3	0	0+0	0	0+0	0	3+0	0	0+0	0
31	FW	(France) FRA	Jérémie Aliadière	3	0	0+1	0	0+0	0	0+2	0	0+0	0
36	DF	(England) ENG	John Halls [R]	3	0	0+0	0	0+0	0	0+3	0	0+0	0
37	FW	(England) ENG	Carlin Itonga [R]	1	0	0+0	0	0+0	0	0+1	0	0+0	0
40	MF	(England) ENG	Rohan Ricketts [R]	1	0	0+0	0	0+0	0	0+1	0	0+0	0
44	DF	(Denmark) DEN	Sebastian Svärd [R]	1	0	0+0	0	0+0	0	0+1	0	0+0	0
57	DF	(Brazil) BRA	Juan [R]	2	0	0+0	0	1+0	0	1+0	0	0+0	0

[R] – Reserve team player [L] – Out on loan [S] – Sold

== See also ==
- 2001–02 in English football
- List of Arsenal F.C. seasons
