= 2001–02 FA Premier League =

Football season in England

FA Premier League
- Season: 2001–02
- Dates: 18 August 2001 – 11 May 2002
- Champions: Arsenal; 2nd Premier League title 12th English title
- Relegated: Ipswich Town; Derby County; Leicester City
- Champions League: Arsenal; Liverpool; Manchester United; Newcastle United
- UEFA Cup: Leeds United; Chelsea; Blackburn Rovers; Ipswich Town (through UEFA Respect Fair Play ranking)
- Intertoto Cup: Aston Villa; Fulham
- Matches: 380
- Goals: 1,001 (2.63 per match)
- Top goalscorer: Thierry Henry (24 goals)
- Best goalkeeper: Nigel Martyn (18 clean sheets)
- Biggest home win: Blackburn Rovers 7–1 West Ham United (14 October 2001)
- Biggest away win: Ipswich Town 0–6 Liverpool (9 February 2002)
- Highest scoring: Tottenham Hotspur 3–5 Manchester United (29 September 2001); Blackburn Rovers 7–1 West Ham United (14 October 2001); Charlton Athletic 4–4 West Ham United (19 November 2001); West Ham United 3–5 Manchester United (16 March 2002); Newcastle United 6–2 Everton (29 March 2002)
- Longest winning run: 13 games Arsenal
- Longest unbeaten run: 21 games Arsenal
- Longest winless run: 16 games Leicester City
- Longest losing run: 7 games Derby County
- Highest attendance: 67,638; Manchester United 0–1 Middlesbrough (23 March 2002)
- Lowest attendance: 15,415; Leicester City 1–2 Middlesbrough (18 September 2001)
- Total attendance: 13,091,502
- Average attendance: 34,451

The 2001–02 FA Premier League (known as the FA Barclaycard Premiership for sponsorship reasons) was the tenth season of the competition. It began with a new sponsor, Barclaycard, and was titled the FA Barclaycard Premiership, replacing the previous sponsor, Carling. The title race turned into a battle among four sides – Arsenal, Manchester United, Liverpool and Newcastle United.

Arsenal clinched the title on 8 May 2002 after a convincing win against Manchester United at Old Trafford, in the penultimate game of the season. This new attacking Arsenal side had won the FA Cup five days before and made history by accomplishing their third double, their second under the reign of Arsène Wenger, who showed his commitment by signing a new four-year deal with Arsenal.

The season started on 18 August 2001 and ended on 11 May 2002.

== Season summary ==
At the start of 2002 the title race was wide open, with the likes of Newcastle United and Leeds United contesting at the top of the table along with the usual likes of Arsenal and Manchester United. Newcastle, after back-to-back away wins at Arsenal and Leeds during the Christmas period, confirmed themselves as genuine title challengers and led the league at the turn of the year. Leeds had topped the table at Christmas prior to losing at Elland Road to Newcastle.

Despite being top of the table at the start of December – eleven points clear of Manchester United – Liverpool underwent a severe slump, falling to fifth place, five points behind United. Would-be contenders Chelsea, Newcastle United and Leeds United had by this point disappeared into the chasing pack.

January saw Liverpool travelling to both Highbury and Old Trafford in the space of a fortnight. Liverpool's Danny Murphy scored a late winner to give the Merseyside club all three points against United, and John Arne Riise then salvaged a point for Liverpool against Arsenal, allowing Manchester United to top the table for the first time that season.

In March, Arsenal were installed as strong favourites for the Premiership title after Liverpool's defeat to Tottenham Hotspur. Arsenal's April triumph against Bolton Wanderers brought them to within three points of a second Premier League title under Arsène Wenger.

Fittingly, the Premiership title would be decided at Old Trafford as Arsenal and Manchester United faced one another in a decisive encounter. Arsenal only required a draw to guarantee their second title in five seasons to go with their FA Cup victory against London rivals Chelsea four days previously; United had to win to take the title race to the last day. In the end, Arsenal emerged victorious as their record signing Sylvain Wiltord scored the only goal of the game as Arsenal was confirmed Premiership champions with a game to spare. Manchester United's disappointment was compounded by Liverpool leapfrogging them into second place by virtue of their 4–3 victory against Blackburn Rovers.

On the final day of the season Liverpool confirmed second place, and in doing so, gaining automatic qualification to the group stage of the UEFA Champions League, by thrashing Ipswich Town 5–0 at Anfield. Arsenal rounded off their successful league campaign in style, beating Everton 4–3 at Highbury. Manchester United limped to a poor draw against Charlton Athletic, completing a disappointing campaign for the deposed league champions, the first time since the Premiership had been formed that they had finished out of the top two places and they were required to play in the qualifying rounds of the Champions League the following season.

Newcastle joined Manchester United in those Champions League qualifying rounds by finishing in fourth, whilst a poor run of results at the beginning of the year saw Leeds United's title and Champions League hopes crumble, they were to finish five points adrift of Newcastle in fifth, and would be joined in the UEFA Cup by Chelsea, whose inconsistent form also put pay to their top four aspirations. Leeds controversially sacked their manager David O'Leary after the season concluded.

For the first time in the history of the Premier League, all three promoted teams avoided relegation – Fulham, Bolton Wanderers and Blackburn Rovers. Blackburn and Bolton spent eleven years in the Premier League, before they were both relegated in 2011–12; coincidentally, in that same season, the three teams promoted from the 2010–11 Football League Championship also stayed up. Fulham spent thirteen years in the top flight before their relegation in 2013–14.

Fulham had splashed out £34 million on new players during the close season, with their owner Mohamed Al-Fayed being one of the wealthiest benefactors in English football. He even boasted that they would win the Premiership title in 2001–02, and most pundits tipped Fulham, managed by former French international Jean Tigana, to push for a place in Europe. However, Fulham finished thirteenth, 47 points away from Arsenal.

Bolton Wanderers went top of the Premiership after winning their first three fixtures of the season, causing an upset by beating Gérard Houllier's Liverpool in the latter stage of the game. Manager Sam Allardyce was boasting that his side were good enough to win their first ever league title, but Bolton's league form slumped after the first two months of the season and they finished 16th place – their survival confirmed in the penultimate game of the season.

Blackburn Rovers were the most successful of the promoted sides. Graeme Souness' men beat Tottenham Hotspur 2–1 in the League Cup final to lift the trophy for the first time, and then climbed from 18th place in the Premiership in late February to finish in a secure 10th place – higher than any other newly promoted team that season. Blackburn secured a UEFA Cup place for 2002–03.

Leicester City was the first team officially relegated from the Premiership, finishing bottom of table with just five Premiership wins in their last season at 111-year-old Filbert Street before relocation to the new 32 000-seat Walkers Stadium. The club went through the regime of two managers during the season – Peter Taylor was replaced by Dave Bassett in early October. Under Bassett, the Foxes briefly climbed out of the relegation zone but a 16-match winless streak including six straight defeats between late January and the beginning of March ultimately sealed their fate. After relegation was confirmed at the beginning of April, Bassett joined the club's board to be replaced by former assistant manager Micky Adams.

Next to go down were Derby County, who had been promoted alongside Leicester six years earlier. Manager Jim Smith resigned in early October to be replaced by assistant manager Colin Todd, who was sacked three months later after Derby were knocked out of the FA Cup by Division Three strugglers Bristol Rovers. In his place came John Gregory, less than a week after he had resigned from Aston Villa but despite his best efforts, he was unable to prevent their relegation, which was confirmed with two games to spare following a 2–0 loss away at Liverpool.

The last team to be relegated were Ipswich Town, who had qualified for the UEFA Cup and earned manager George Burley the Manager of the Year award the previous season after finishing fifth. Ipswich made a terrible start to the season, winning just one of their first 18 Premiership games. They then went on a strong run of form, winning seven out of eight games, which looked to have secured their Premiership survival, but they then suffered another slump which they were unable to halt. Coincidentally, like Derby, they too were sent down by losing away at Liverpool, who thrashed them 5–0 on the final day. Bizarrely, despite their relegation, Ipswich's disciplinary record this season was the best of the teams that hadn't qualified for European competition via league position, thus giving them a second successive UEFA Cup campaign for the following season after England received one of the three additional slots awarded through the UEFA Fair Play ranking.

== Teams ==
Twenty teams competed in the league – the top seventeen teams from the previous season and the three teams promoted from the First Division. The promoted teams were Fulham, Blackburn Rovers and Bolton Wanderers, returning after a top flight absence of thirty-three, two and three years respectively. This was also Fulham's first season in the Premier League. They replaced Manchester City, Coventry City, and Bradford City, who were relegated to the First Division after their top flight presences of one, thirty-four and two years respectively.

=== Stadiums and locations ===
Locations of the 2001–02 Premier League teams
Greater London Premier League football clubs

Team	Location	Stadium	Capacity
Arsenal	London (Highbury)	Arsenal Stadium	38,419
Aston Villa	Birmingham	Villa Park	42,573
Blackburn Rovers	Blackburn	Ewood Park	31,367
Bolton Wanderers	Bolton	Reebok Stadium	28,723
Charlton Athletic	London (Charlton)	The Valley	27,111
Chelsea	London (Fulham)	Stamford Bridge	42,055
Derby County	Derby	Pride Park Stadium	33,597
Everton	Liverpool (Walton)	Goodison Park	40,569
Fulham	London (Fulham)	Craven Cottage	24,600
Ipswich Town	Ipswich	Portman Road	30,300
Leeds United	Leeds	Elland Road	40,242
Leicester City	Leicester	Filbert Street (Note: This was Leicester City's last season at Filbert Street as they were scheduled to relocate to the Walkers Stadium at the end of the season.)	22,000
Liverpool	Liverpool (Anfield)	Anfield	45,522
Manchester United	Manchester	Old Trafford	68,174
Middlesbrough	Middlesbrough	Riverside Stadium	35,049
Newcastle United	Newcastle upon Tyne	St James' Park	52,387
Southampton	Southampton	St Mary's Stadium (Note: Southampton had moved to St Mary's Stadium after spending 103 years at The Dell.)	32,689
Sunderland	Sunderland	Stadium of Light	49,000
Tottenham Hotspur	London (Tottenham)	White Hart Lane	36,240
West Ham United	London (Upton Park)	Boleyn Ground	35,647

=== Personnel and kits ===
Team	Manager	Captain	Kit manufacturer	Shirt sponsor
Arsenal	(France) Arsène Wenger	(England) Tony Adams	Nike	Dreamcast/Sega^{1}
Aston Villa	(England) Graham Taylor	(England) Paul Merson	Diadora	NTL
Blackburn Rovers	(Scotland) Graeme Souness	(England) Garry Flitcroft	Kappa	Time
Bolton Wanderers	(England) Sam Allardyce	(Iceland) Guðni Bergsson	Reebok	Reebok
Charlton Athletic	(England) Alan Curbishley	(Republic of Ireland) Mark Kinsella	Le Coq Sportif	Redbus
Chelsea	(Italy) Claudio Ranieri	(France) Marcel Desailly	Umbro	Fly Emirates
Derby County	(England) John Gregory	(Jamaica) Darryl Powell	Erreà	Pedigree
Everton	(Scotland) David Moyes	(Scotland) David Weir	Puma	One 2 One
Fulham	(France) Jean Tigana	(Wales) Andy Melville	Adidas	Pizza Hut
Ipswich Town	(Scotland) George Burley	(Republic of Ireland) Matt Holland	Punch	TXU Energi
Leeds United	(Republic of Ireland) David O'Leary	(England) Rio Ferdinand	Nike	Strongbow
Leicester City	(England) Micky Adams	(Scotland) Matt Elliott	Le Coq Sportif	LG
Liverpool	(France) Gérard Houllier	(England) Jamie Redknapp	Reebok	Carlsberg
Manchester United	(Scotland) Sir Alex Ferguson	(Republic of Ireland) Roy Keane	Umbro	Vodafone
Middlesbrough	(England) Steve McClaren	(England) Paul Ince	Erreà	BT Cellnet
Newcastle United	(England) Bobby Robson	(England) Alan Shearer	Adidas	NTL
Southampton	(Scotland) Gordon Strachan	(England) Matt Le Tissier	Saints	Friends Provident
Sunderland	(England) Peter Reid	(England) Michael Gray	Nike	Reg Vardy
Tottenham Hotspur	(England) Glenn Hoddle	(England) Tim Sherwood	Adidas	Holsten
West Ham United	(England) Glenn Roeder	(Northern Ireland) Steve Lomas	Fila	Dr. Martens

- ^{1} The Dreamcast logo appeared on Arsenal's home and third shirts while the Sega logo appeared on their away shirt

=== Managerial changes ===
Team	Outgoing manager	Manner of departure	Date of vacancy	Position in table	Incoming manager	Date of appointment
Middlesbrough	(England) Bryan Robson (England) Terry Venables	Mutual consent	5 June 2001	Pre-season	(England) Steve McClaren	12 June 2001
West Ham United	(England) Glenn Roeder (caretaker)	End of caretaker spell	14 June 2001	Pre-season	(England) Glenn Roeder	14 June 2001
Leicester City	(England) Peter Taylor	Sacked	30 September 2001	20th	(England) Dave Bassett	10 October 2001
Southampton	(England) Stuart Gray	Sacked	1 October 2001	12th	(Scotland) Gordon Strachan	1 October 2001
Derby County	(England) Jim Smith	Resigned	7 October 2001	19th	(England) Colin Todd	8 October 2001
Derby County	(England) Colin Todd	Sacked	14 January 2002	19th	(England) John Gregory	30 January 2002
Aston Villa	(England) John Gregory	Resigned	24 January 2002	7th	(England) Graham Taylor	5 February 2002
Everton	(Scotland) Walter Smith	Sacked	10 March 2002	16th	(Scotland) David Moyes	16 March 2002
Leicester City	(England) Dave Bassett	Promoted to director of football position	6 April 2002	20th	(England) Micky Adams	7 April 2002

== League table ==
Pos	Team	Pld	W	D	L	GF	GA	GD	Pts	Qualification or relegation
1	Arsenal (C)	38	26	9	3	79	36	+43	87	Qualification for the Champions League first group stage
2	Liverpool	38	24	8	6	67	30	+37	80	Qualification for the Champions League first group stage
3	Manchester United	38	24	5	9	87	45	+42	77	Qualification for the Champions League third qualifying round
4	Newcastle United	38	21	8	9	74	52	+22	71	Qualification for the Champions League third qualifying round
5	Leeds United	38	18	12	8	53	37	+16	66	Qualification for the UEFA Cup first round (Note: Since Arsenal qualified for the Champions League, their UEFA Cup place as FA Cup winners defaulted to Chelsea, the losing finalists.)
6	Chelsea	38	17	13	8	66	38	+28	64	Qualification for the UEFA Cup first round
7	West Ham United	38	15	8	15	48	57	−9	53	
8	Aston Villa	38	12	14	12	46	47	−1	50	Qualification for the Intertoto Cup third round
9	Tottenham Hotspur	38	14	8	16	49	53	−4	50	
10	Blackburn Rovers	38	12	10	16	55	51	+4	46	Qualification for the UEFA Cup first round (Note: Blackburn Rovers qualified for the UEFA Cup as League Cup winners.)
11	Southampton	38	12	9	17	46	54	−8	45	
12	Middlesbrough	38	12	9	17	35	47	−12	45	
13	Fulham	38	10	14	14	36	44	−8	44	Qualification for the Intertoto Cup second round
14	Charlton Athletic	38	10	14	14	38	49	−11	44	
15	Everton	38	11	10	17	45	57	−12	43	
16	Bolton Wanderers	38	9	13	16	44	62	−18	40	
17	Sunderland	38	10	10	18	29	51	−22	40	
18	Ipswich Town (R)	38	9	9	20	41	64	−23	36	UEFA Cup QR and relegation to the First Division (Note: Ipswich Town qualified for the UEFA Cup qualifying as the winners of Premiership Fair Play League by The Football Association, and as one of the UEFA Fair Play ranking winners.)
19	Derby County (R)	38	8	6	24	33	63	−30	30	Relegation to the Football League First Division
20	Leicester City (R)	38	5	13	20	30	64	−34	28	Relegation to the Football League First Division

Source: Premier League
Rules for classification: 1) points; 2) goal difference; 3) number of goals scored.
(C) Champions; (R) Relegated

== Results ==
Home \ Away	ARS	AVL	BLB	BOL	CHA	CHE	DER	EVE	FUL	IPS	LEE	LEI	LIV	MUN	MID	NEW	SOU	SUN	TOT	WHU
Arsenal	—	3–2	3–3	1–1	2–4	2–1	1–0	4–3	4–1	2–0	1–2	4–0	1–1	3–1	2–1	1–3	1–1	3–0	2–1	2–0
Aston Villa	1–2	—	2–0	3–2	1–0	1–1	2–1	0–0	2–0	2–1	0–1	0–2	1–2	1–1	0–0	1–1	2–1	0–0	1–1	2–1
Blackburn Rovers	2–3	3–0	—	1–1	4–1	0–0	0–1	1–0	3–0	2–1	1–2	0–0	1–1	2–2	0–1	2–2	2–0	0–3	2–1	7–1
Bolton Wanderers	0–2	3–2	1–1	—	0–0	2–2	1–3	2–2	0–0	4–1	0–3	2–2	2–1	0–4	1–0	0–4	0–1	0–2	1–1	1–0
Charlton Athletic	0–3	1–2	0–2	1–2	—	2–1	1–0	1–2	1–1	3–2	0–2	2–0	0–2	0–2	0–0	1–1	1–1	2–2	3–1	4–4
Chelsea	1–1	1–3	0–0	5–1	0–1	—	2–1	3–0	3–2	2–1	2–0	2–0	4–0	0–3	2–2	1–1	2–4	4–0	4–0	5–1
Derby County	0–2	3–1	2–1	1–0	1–1	1–1	—	3–4	0–1	1–3	0–1	2–3	0–1	2–2	0–1	2–3	1–0	0–1	1–0	0–0
Everton	0–1	3–2	1–2	3–1	0–3	0–0	1–0	—	2–1	1–2	0–0	2–2	1–3	0–2	2–0	1–3	2–0	1–0	1–1	5–0
Fulham	1–3	0–0	2–0	3–0	0–0	1–1	0–0	2–0	—	1–1	0–0	0–0	0–2	2–3	2–1	3–1	2–1	2–0	0–2	0–1
Ipswich Town	0–2	0–0	1–1	1–2	0–1	0–0	3–1	0–0	1–0	—	1–2	2–0	0–6	0–1	1–0	0–1	1–3	5–0	2–1	2–3
Leeds United	1–1	1–1	3–1	0–0	0–0	0–0	3–0	3–2	0–1	2–0	—	2–2	0–4	3–4	1–0	3–4	2–0	2–0	2–1	3–0
Leicester City	1–3	2–2	2–1	0–5	1–1	2–3	0–3	0–0	0–0	1–1	0–2	—	1–4	0–1	1–2	0–0	0–4	1–0	2–1	1–1
Liverpool	1–2	1–3	4–3	1–1	2–0	1–0	2–0	1–1	0–0	5–0	1–1	1–0	—	3–1	2–0	3–0	1–1	1–0	1–0	2–1
Manchester United	0–1	1–0	2–1	1–2	0–0	0–3	5–0	4–1	3–2	4–0	1–1	2–0	0–1	—	0–1	3–1	6–1	4–1	4–0	0–1
Middlesbrough	0–4	2–1	1–3	1–1	0–0	0–2	5–1	1–0	2–1	0–0	2–2	1–0	1–2	0–1	—	1–4	1–3	2–0	1–1	2–0
Newcastle United	0–2	3–0	2–1	3–2	3–0	1–2	1–0	6–2	1–1	2–2	3–1	1–0	0–2	4–3	3–0	—	3–1	1–1	0–2	3–1
Southampton	0–2	1–3	1–2	0–0	1–0	0–2	2–0	0–1	1–1	3–3	0–1	2–2	2–0	1–3	1–1	3–1	—	2–0	1–0	2–0
Sunderland	1–1	1–1	1–0	1–0	2–2	0–0	1–1	1–0	1–1	1–0	2–0	2–1	0–1	1–3	0–1	0–1	1–1	—	1–2	1–0
Tottenham Hotspur	1–1	0–0	1–0	3–2	0–1	2–3	3–1	1–1	4–0	1–2	2–1	2–1	1–0	3–5	2–1	1–3	2–0	2–1	—	1–1
West Ham United	1–1	1–1	2–0	2–1	2–0	2–1	4–0	1–0	0–2	3–1	0–0	1–0	1–1	3–5	1–0	3–0	2–0	3–0	0–1	—

Source: Premier League
Legend: Blue = home team win; Yellow = draw; Red = away team win.

== Season statistics ==
=== Scoring ===
- First goal of the season:
  (England) Kevin Nolan for Bolton Wanderers against Leicester City (18 August 2001)
- Last goal of the season:
  (Scotland) Paul Telfer for Southampton against Newcastle United (11 May 2002)

==== Top scorers ====
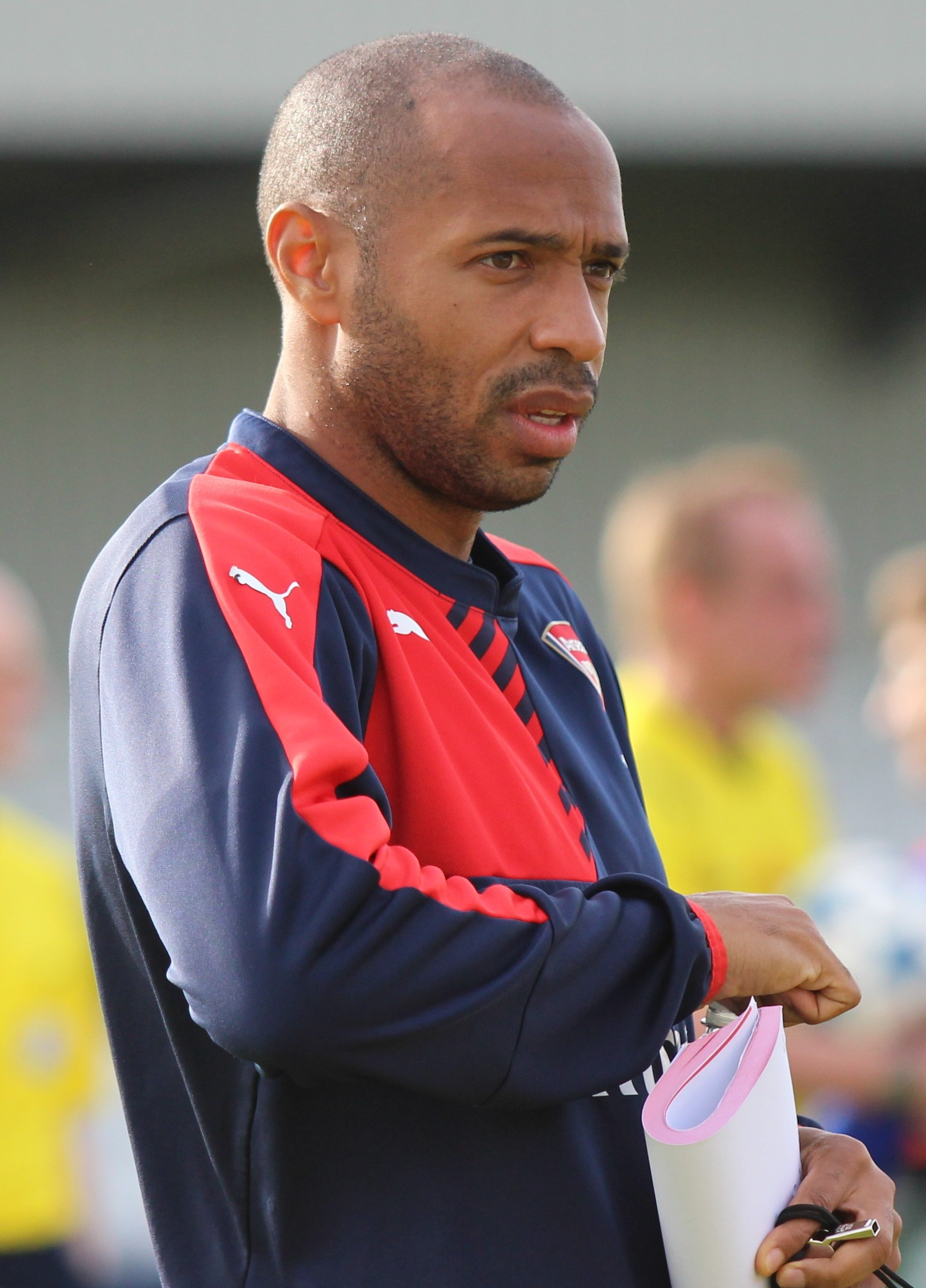
Arsenal's Thierry Henry was the top scorer, with 24 goals.

Rank	Player	Club	Goals
1	(France) Thierry Henry	Arsenal	24
2	(Netherlands) Jimmy Floyd Hasselbaink	Chelsea	23
2	(Netherlands) Ruud van Nistelrooy	Manchester United	23
2	(England) Alan Shearer	Newcastle United	23
5	(England) Michael Owen	Liverpool	19
6	(Norway) Ole Gunnar Solskjær	Manchester United	17
7	(England) Robbie Fowler	Liverpool; Leeds United	15
8	(Iceland) Eiður Guðjohnsen	Chelsea	14
8	(Latvia) Marians Pahars	Southampton	14
10	(England) Andy Cole	Manchester United; Blackburn Rovers	13

==== Hat-tricks ====
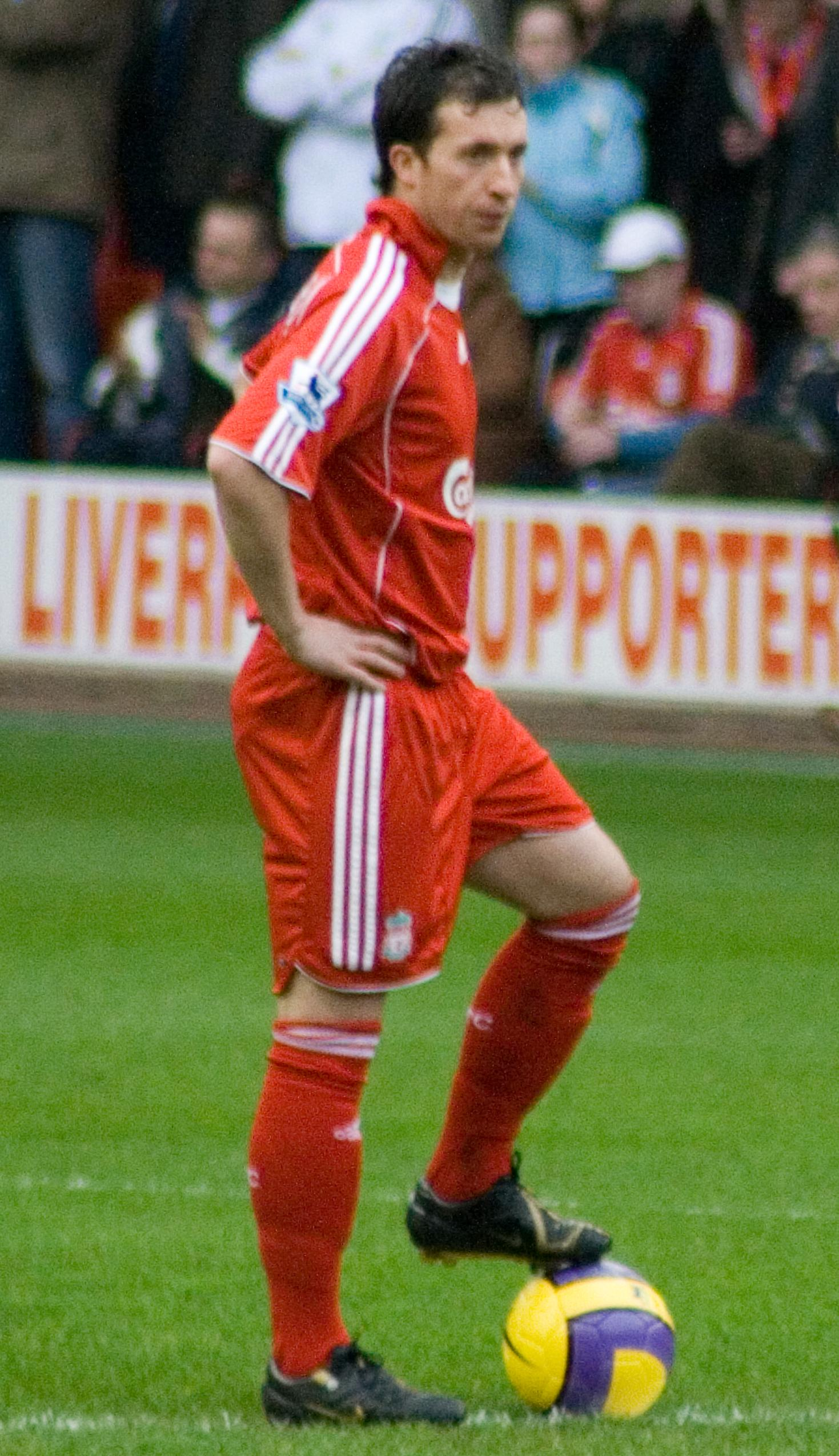
The 2001–02 Premier League season would see Robbie Fowler score his final hat-tricks of his professional career.

Player	For	Against	Result	Date	Ref
(England) Robbie Fowler	Liverpool	Leicester City	4–1 (A)	20 October 2001	
(England) Paul Kitson	West Ham United	Charlton Athletic	4–4 (A)	19 November 2001	
(Netherlands) Ruud van Nistelrooy	Manchester United	Southampton	6–1 (H)	22 December 2001	
(England) Robbie Fowler	Leeds United	Bolton Wanderers	3–0 (A)	26 December 2001	
(Norway) Ole Gunnar Solskjær	Manchester United	Bolton Wanderers	4–0 (A)	29 January 2002	
(Netherlands) Jimmy Floyd Hasselbaink^{P}	Chelsea	Tottenham Hotspur	4–0 (H)	13 March 2002	
(Germany) Fredi Bobic	Bolton Wanderers	Ipswich Town	4–1 (H)	6 April 2002	

Note: ^{P} Player scored a perfect hat-trick; (H) – Home; (A) – Away

== Awards ==
=== Monthly awards ===
Month	Manager of the Month		Player of the Month	
Month	Manager	Club	Player	Club
August	(England) Sam Allardyce	Bolton Wanderers	(France) Louis Saha	Fulham
September	(England) John Gregory	Aston Villa	(Argentina) Juan Sebastián Verón	Manchester United
October	(England) Glenn Hoddle	Tottenham Hotspur	(England) Rio Ferdinand	Leeds United
November	(England) Phil Thompson	Liverpool	(England) Danny Murphy	Liverpool
December	(England) Bobby Robson	Newcastle United	(Netherlands) Ruud van Nistelrooy	Manchester United
January	(Scotland) Gordon Strachan	Southampton	(England) Marcus Bent	Ipswich Town
February	(England) Bobby Robson	Newcastle United	(Netherlands) Ruud van Nistelrooy	Manchester United
March	(France) Gérard Houllier (England) Phil Thompson	Liverpool	(Netherlands) Dennis Bergkamp	Arsenal
April	(France) Arsène Wenger	Arsenal	(Sweden) Freddie Ljungberg	Arsenal

=== Annual awards ===
Award	Winner	Club
Premier League Manager of the Season	(France) Arsène Wenger	Arsenal
Premier League Player of the Season	(Sweden) Freddie Ljungberg	Arsenal
PFA Players' Player of the Year	(Netherlands) Ruud van Nistelrooy	Manchester United
PFA Young Player of the Year	(Wales) Craig Bellamy	Newcastle United
FWA Footballer of the Year	(France) Robert Pires	Arsenal

PFA Team of the Year
Goalkeeper	(Republic of Ireland) Shay Given (Newcastle United)			
Defence	(Republic of Ireland) Steve Finnan (Fulham)	(England) Rio Ferdinand (Leeds United)	(Finland) Sami Hyypiä (Liverpool)	(England) Wayne Bridge (Southampton)
Midfield	(France) Robert Pires (Arsenal)	(Republic of Ireland) Roy Keane (Manchester United)	(France) Patrick Vieira (Arsenal)	(Wales) Ryan Giggs (Manchester United)
Attack	(Netherlands) Ruud van Nistelrooy (Manchester United)		(France) Thierry Henry (Arsenal)	

== Attendances ==
No.	Club	Matches	Total attendance	Average
1	Manchester United	19	1,283,594	67,558
2	Newcastle United	19	976,079	51,373
3	Sunderland AFC	19	888,156	46,745
4	Liverpool FC	19	824,395	43,389
5	Leeds United	19	755,287	39,752
6	Chelsea FC	19	741,579	39,030
7	Arsenal FC	19	723,036	38,055
8	Aston Villa	19	665,223	35,012
9	Tottenham Hotspur	19	665,015	35,001
10	Everton FC	19	646,067	34,004
11	West Ham United	19	595,800	31,358
12	Southampton FC	19	582,019	30,633
13	Derby County	19	566,508	29,816
14	Middlesbrough FC	19	540,719	28,459
15	Blackburn Rovers	19	493,551	25,976
16	Bolton Wanderers	19	476,867	25,098
17	Ipswich Town	19	464,086	24,426
18	Charlton Athletic	19	459,131	24,165
19	Leicester City	19	376,871	19,835
20	Fulham FC	19	367,519	19,343

== See also ==
- 2001–02 in English football
