= Freddie Ljungberg =

Swedish footballer and manager (born 1977)

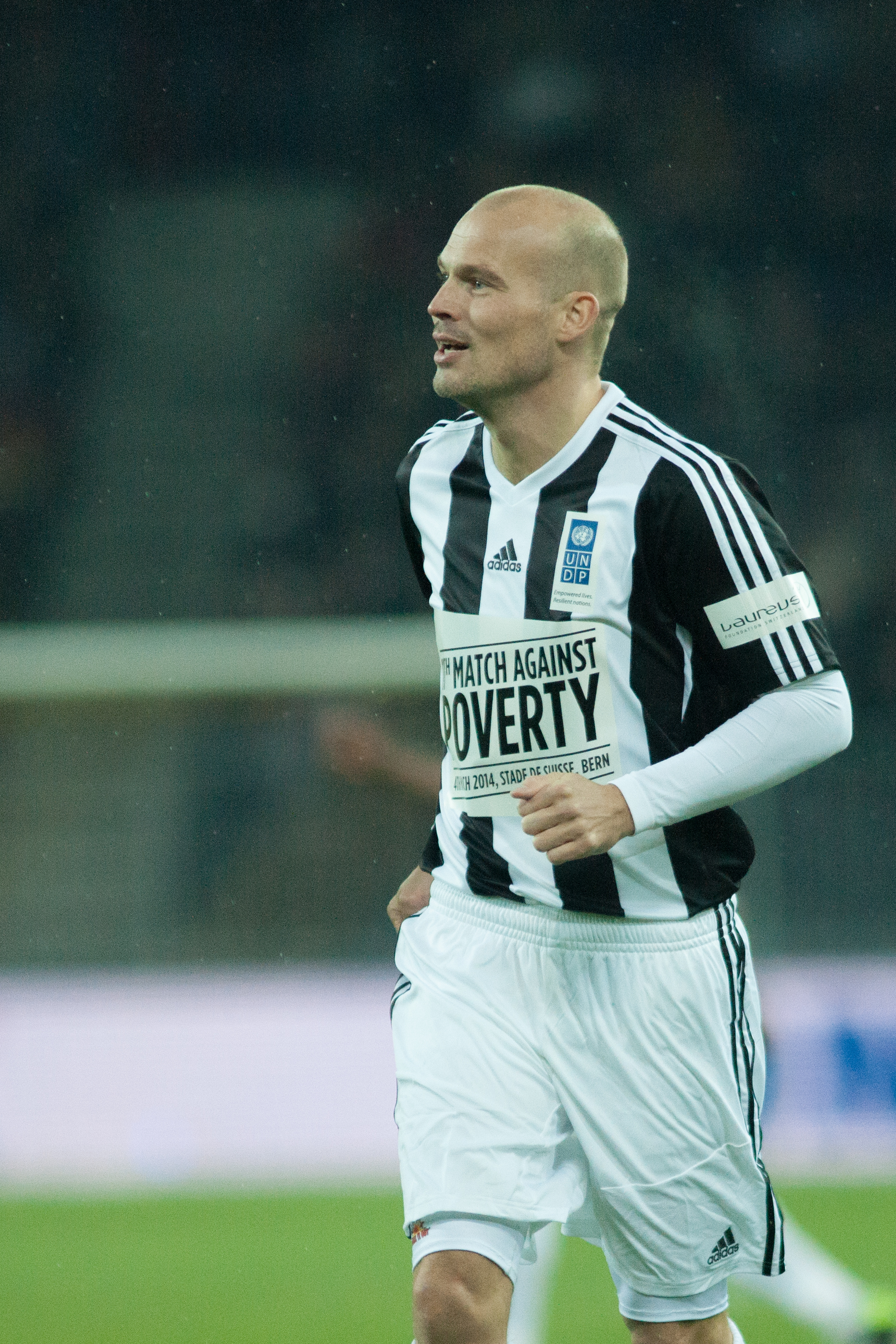
- Ljungberg playing in the Match Against Poverty in 2014

Personal information
- Full name: Karl Fredrik Ljungberg
- Date of birth: 16 April 1977 (age 49)
- Place of birth: Vittsjö, Sweden
- Height: 1.75 m (5 ft 9 in)
- Positions: Wide midfielder; winger

Youth career
- 1982–1994: Halmstad

Senior career*
Years	Team	Apps	(Gls)
1994–1998	Halmstad	79	(10)
1998–2007	Arsenal	216	(46)
2007–2008	West Ham United	25	(2)
2009–2010	Seattle Sounders FC	37	(2)
2010	Chicago Fire	15	(2)
2011	Celtic	7	(0)
2011–2012	Shimizu S-Pulse	8	(0)
2014	Mumbai City	4	(0)
Total		391	(62)

International career
1993	Sweden U16	4	(2)
1994	Sweden U18	8	(1)
1995–1998	Sweden U21	12	(5)
1998–2008	Sweden	75	(14)

Managerial career
- 2019: Arsenal (caretaker)
- * Club domestic league appearances and goals

Karl Fredrik Ljungberg (Swedish pronunciation: [ˈfrěːdrɪk ˈjɵ̂ŋːbærj]; born 16 April 1977) is a Swedish professional football manager and former player who played as a wide midfielder or winger. He was most recently an assistant coach, and interim head coach of Premier League club Arsenal.

He began his career at Halmstad and went on to spend most of his career at Arsenal, where he won honours including two Premier League titles and three FA Cups, scoring in two finals including the victory in 2002. After leaving Arsenal in 2007, he had short spells at a number of clubs in England, Scotland, the United States, Japan and India. An international for a full decade, Ljungberg earned 75 caps and represented Sweden national team at UEFA Euro 2000, 2004 and 2008, as well as at the 2002 and 2006 FIFA World Cups. He was captain of Sweden from 2006 until he announced his international retirement after UEFA Euro 2008.

Ljungberg was a model for Calvin Klein underwear until 2007. He previously represented brands such as Nike, Procter & Gamble, L'Oréal, Puma, Beats, ESPN and Pepsi.

== Early life ==
Ljungberg was born on 16 April 1977 in Vittsjö to Roy Alve Erling Ljungberg, an owner of a construction and consultant business with a masters in engineering, and Elisabeth Bodil Ljungberg, a Swedish Labor Department worker. On 12 September 1984, the Ljungbergs had another son, Karl Oskar Filip. In 1982, the Ljungberg family left Vittsjö and moved to Halmstad. At first, the tenacious five-year old would not have any part of moving. He argued with his parents that he did not want to live in Halmstad. His parents relented and took him to Halmstads BK, where he played on the youth team under manager Olle Eriksson.

From the time he was from five to fourteen, Ljungberg was coached by Eriksson. Eriksson's impression of the youngster was that he was remarkably talented for his age and that he was considerate of other players, noting that Ljungberg would pass the ball to his friends, so that they would have a chance to score. He credits the Brazilian footballer Sócrates, and Eriksson for having a profound effect on his career. During his youth days, Ljungberg also enjoyed playing ice hockey and developed a talent for handball; he was eventually called up to the under-15 national handball team, but decided to focus his attentions on football.

Ljungberg did well in academic subjects and sports. When he finished ninth grade in his högstadium school, his marks averaged 4.1 on the five-point scale. At the age of 18, Ljungberg attended university to study information technology and economics, but he struggled to balance the hectic academic timetable with the physically demanding commitments of professional football. Eventually, he quit university to concentrate on his football career.

== Club career ==
=== Halmstad ===
In 1989, at the age of 12, Ljungberg had convinced Halmstads BK to move him from P12 to P14 which was against Halmstad's policies at the time. At age 14, Ljungberg joined the junior team under coach Robert Nordström. His perseverance paid off because three years later he was moved up to the senior team.

Ljungberg made his senior debut on 23 October 1994 in the Allsvenskan against AIK. In 1995, Ljungberg played 31 games in which he scored his first goal as a professional player. That same year, Halmstad won Svenska Cupen. In 1997, Halmstad won the Allsvenskan with Ljungberg netting and assisting goals that season for the club, despite picking up injuries. During his time with Halmstad, he went on to make 139 appearances and score 16 goals for the club. After winning several trophies in his years with Halmstad, Ljungberg's star was on the rise with interest from Barcelona, Chelsea, Aston Villa, Parma and Arsenal.

=== Arsenal ===
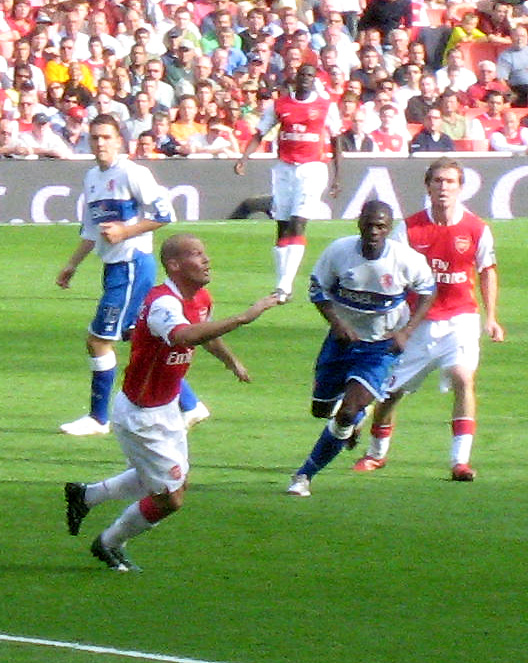
Ljungberg (second from left) playing for Arsenal in a match against Middlesbrough in September 2006

Ljungberg was signed by Arsenal in 1998 for £3 million. Arsenal scouts watched him for over a year and Arsenal's manager, Arsène Wenger, took the unusual step of authorising the signing after watching Ljungberg play for Sweden in their victory against England on television, without seeing him play live. Seeing Ljungberg's performance against England only confirmed to Wenger that Ljungberg could cope against English opponents, and he was signed shortly after. Ljungberg proved himself without difficulty and scored on his debut on 20 September after coming on as a substitute against rival club Manchester United, the match ending 3–0. Ljungberg made 21 appearances across all competitions in his first season, and 43 in his second (1999-2000). He missed the 2000 UEFA Cup Final due to a rib injury. At the end of his third season at Arsenal, 2000–01, they got to the 2001 FA Cup Final. Ljungberg scored to put Arsenal 1-0 up but then Liverpool scored two late goals to win 2–1. This made Ljungberg the first player to score a goal at an FA Cup final outside England, with the game being the first final at the Millennium Stadium in Cardiff.

Some of Ljungberg's best form came in the second half of the 2001–02 season, when Arsenal won their second Premier League and FA Cup double. Following a knee injury to Robert Pires, Ljungberg scored in most of Arsenal's remaining games, including a stunning finish for Arsenal's second goal in the 2–0 FA Cup Final win over Chelsea. Ljungberg had scored many important and vital goals for Arsenal throughout the season. He scored an equaliser against Manchester United, in a game where Arsenal went on to win 3–1. He was instrumental in Arsenal's 2–1 win against Liverpool at Anfield where he won a penalty which Thierry Henry scored and then he slotted in a sweet finish from a Pires cross. He scored a nearly identical goal again against Liverpool at Highbury three weeks later, where the matched ended up being a 1–1 draw. Ljungberg ended the 2001–02 season scoring 17 goals in all competitions. In the 2002 FA Cup Final he became the first player in 40 years to score in consecutive FA Cup Finals.

In the 2002–03 season Ljungberg helped Arsenal reach a third consecutive FA Cup final. He scored the winning goal in the semi-final against Sheffield United, and then started the final as Arsenal defeated Southampton. It was Ljungberg's blocked shot which set up Robert Pires to score the winning goal. This season Ljungberg also scored his first hat-trick for Arsenal in a 4–0 win at Sunderland.

In 2003–04 Ljungberg made 30 league appearances during Arsenal's unbeaten Invincibles season. That season he scored the winning goal against rivals Tottenham Hotspur at Highbury. The following season (2004–05) Ljungberg played in his fourth FA Cup final, when he came on as a substitute and scored one of Arsenal's penalties in the shootout as they defeated Manchester United.

He was most comfortable as a winger on either side of midfield, though he could also play centrally in a 4–5–1 formation, or even as a second striker. Ljungberg became a regular in Arsenal's starting line-up following the departure of Emmanuel Petit and Marc Overmars in the summer of 2000. For several seasons he played a major role for the club including being a member of the unbeaten 49-game run for Arsenal. He had to fight with constant injury problems and occasionally severe bouts with migraines; in 2005 a persistent hip injury led to fears he may have contracted cancer, which were unfounded. It transpired that he was suffering from blood poisoning caused by his large tattoos.

Despite a persistent ankle injury, Ljungberg played for Arsenal in the 2–1 defeat by Barcelona in the Champions League Final in Paris on 17 May 2006.

It was speculated in January 2007 that Ljungberg was being forced to leave Arsenal, after bosses became tired of a run of injuries restricting his play. "Ljungberg still has a lot to offer to Arsenal," Arsène Wenger said, on 13 January 2007, at a Blackburn Rovers pre-match press conference, stressing the fact that Ljungberg will stay at Arsenal until the end of his contract in 2009.

Ljungberg came back after a long injury in an FA Cup match against Bolton Wanderers, scoring a goal thirteen minutes before the end of extra time, earning Arsenal a place in the fifth round tie of the FA Cup against Blackburn Rovers. In a game away at rivals Tottenham Hotspur on 21 April 2007 Ljungberg limped off with an injury in the first half, and this proved to be his final appearance for the club.

In 2008, Ljungberg placed eleventh in Arsenal.com's Gunners' Greatest 50 Players.

=== West Ham United ===
On 23 July 2007, after nine years at Arsenal, Ljungberg joined London rivals West Ham United on a four-year contract. Ljungberg made his West Ham debut on the opening day of the 2007–08 season, in West Ham's 2–0 home defeat by Manchester City on 11 August, a game in which he was also captain. After seven months at the club, Ljungberg finally scored his first goal for West Ham in the home match against Birmingham City on 9 February 2008, putting West Ham up 1–0, with the game finishing 1–1. Ljungberg also scored what turned out to be his final goal for the club in a 2–1 defeat away at Sunderland a month later.

In his last game of the season, Newcastle United defender Steven Taylor accidentally landed on top of him while trying to jump over him, breaking his ribs. The injury sidelined Ljungberg for the rest of the season. In May, it was reported that Ljungberg was offered £3 million to tear up his contract. This was quickly dismissed by both Ljungberg's agents, Claes Elefalk and Scott Duxbury, West Ham's chief executive.

In June 2008, Ljungberg retired from the Sweden national team, saying:"I have decided to concentrate on my football with West Ham. This is where my priority now lies."

Following the start of training camp, Ljungberg was nowhere to be seen. Many speculated a transfer was in the works despite Elefalk's claims that Ljungberg was to return. Days later, Ljungberg agreed to terminate his contract only after one year into the four-year deal for a sum of £6 million. Ljungberg stated afterwards: "I gave my all at West Ham and enjoyed my time there but the decision is the best for the both of us. Now, I will take my time to consider my football future."

=== Football hiatus ===
After Ljungberg's West Ham exit, fans and sport pundits alike speculated about Ljungberg's future. On 8 August, Ljungberg was seen in Los Angeles fuelling rumours of a move to LA Galaxy which was quickly dismissed. In actuality, Ljungberg went to Los Angeles to get a tattoo done by renowned tattoo artist Mister Cartoon. While he was in Los Angeles, Elefalk urged Ljungberg to meet with Joe Roth, a Hollywood producer and majority stakeholder in the Major League Soccer expansion team Seattle Sounders FC. Ljungberg secretly met with Roth but did not want to make any rash decisions. At the same time, there were rumours of four Italian clubs being interested in Ljungberg including Lazio, Milan, Roma, and Fiorentina. By the end of August, Ljungberg was linked to Portsmouth. On 28 August, Ljungberg's agent told the Swedish press that Ljungberg was continuing to train at his old football club Halmstads BK but was unsure of his football future. At the end of the transfer window, Ljungberg was linked to AS Monaco. When Ljungberg declined to join Monaco after the transfer window closed, many believed Ljungberg was finished with football.

In early September, Ljungberg was seen in New York City during New York Fashion Week. At this time, the Daily Star reported that Ljungberg was looking to become a furniture designer. Shortly after, Ljungberg was seen in London with Natalie Imbruglia.

=== Seattle Sounders FC ===
On 17 October 2008, the Seattle Post-Intelligencer reported that Ljungberg might be a part of the new Major League Soccer franchise Seattle Sounders FC. On 28 October 2008, the club officially announced they had signed Ljungberg as their designated player for the 2009 season. The terms of his contract saw Ljungberg earn $10 million over two seasons with the Sounders. Much like the contract of David Beckham and as is the norm for professional sports stars in the US, Ljungberg's contract assured that he kept all of the money derived from his private endorsements. Because of this, Grahame L. Jones of the Los Angeles Times was quick to compare Ljungberg with Beckham. Alexi Lalas stated: "Eddie Vedder, I think, would have a better chance of making an impact at Seattle than Freddie Ljungberg". However, after the 2009 regular season Lalas acknowledged his initial skepticism but admitted he had changed his mind. "For me he's the best DP signing, because of the way he plays in MLS."

In December 2008, it was announced that Ljungberg would undergo surgery to repair a persistent hip injury that has plagued him throughout his later career. Surgeons repaired a slightly torn hip labrum and shaved a small amount of bone where the hip meets the femur to prevent future injury. The Seattle Times reported that Ljungberg was expected to miss ten to twelve weeks of training and possibly be sidelined for the team's inaugural game, but he recovered from his hip injury sooner than expected. Although Ljungberg did not take part of Seattle's preseason in Argentina, he did however do light training with IS Halmia.

Once the Sounders returned to Seattle, Ljungberg joined in training. Despite his speedy recovery, Ljungberg did not participate in the inaugural game against New York Red Bulls. He made his debut one week later on 28 March 2009, coming on as a 61st-minute substitute in a 2–0 victory over Real Salt Lake. The following week he made his first start on 4 April 2009 against Toronto FC, where he also scored his first MLS goal. Ljungberg played his first full game against Chivas USA in Los Angeles in which they lost 2–0. While some noted that Fredy Montero and Ljungberg were not cohesive on the pitch, due to Ljungberg's absence in the preseason and few practices with one other, coach Sigi Schmid answered: "That's just something that takes some time. But they're both quality players and it will get sorted out I think a lot sooner than later."

Ljungberg missed two games against FC Dallas and Colorado Rapids due to a migraine attack. He quickly recovered to play against Chivas USA. On 30 May 2009, the Sounders drew their fifth match in a row, this time against the Columbus Crew, after Ljungberg missed a penalty kick in the 31st minute. Ljungberg scored his second goal for the season against the San Jose Earthquakes on 13 June 2009 as a result of beating Joe Cannon to the ball, lofting it over him and into the center of the net. In the 59th minute, Ljungberg's corner kick set up Montero's goal which led the Sounders to a 2–0 victory. After playing D.C. United, Ljungberg suffered from some hamstring tightness. Ljungberg did suit up for the New York Red Bulls game on 20 June 2009, but he did not play as a result of the injury. On 28 June, Ljungberg assisted Montero's 23rd-minute goal against the Colorado Rapids. He was subbed out toward the end of the game, in which he received a standing ovation. Ljungberg sat out for the US Open Cup game against the USL side Portland Timbers and focused on training during the four-week vacation in July. Following the brief holiday vacation, Seattle defeated Houston Dynamo, a game in which Ljungberg was heavily targeted and fouled. Despite this, Ljungberg outmaneuvered his opponents and assisted a goal to Patrick Ianni. As is so, the Bleacher Report thus dubbed him the man of the match.

During his 2009 season, the Daily Express noted rumors that Ljungberg was poised to return to a European club, but Ljungberg assured fans that he would stay to fulfill his two-year contract. The Swede also gave the insight that he might even extend his contract beyond 2010.

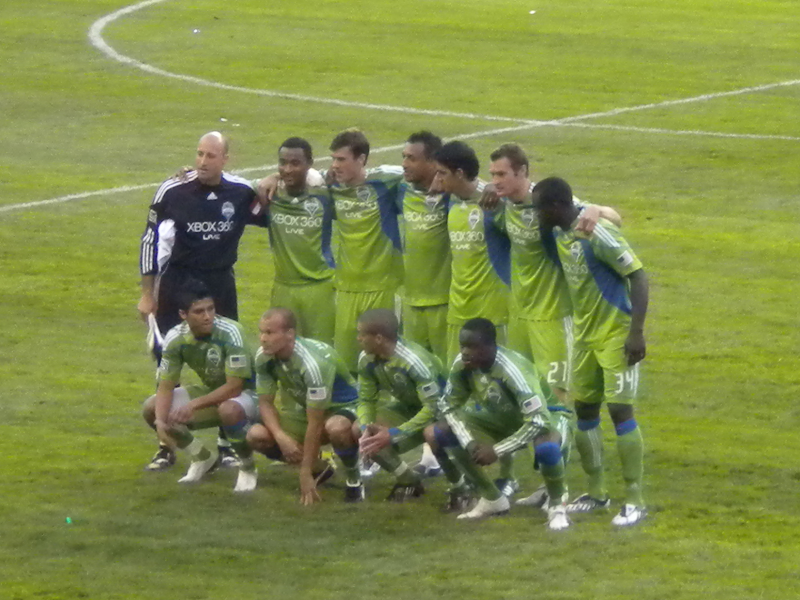
Ljungberg (front, second from left) lining up for Seattle Sounders FC in August 2009 ahead of a friendly against Barcelona

In July 2009, Ljungberg was selected for starting MLS' All-Stars along with teammate Kasey Keller. Selection for the All-Star team is based upon votes from players, coaches, general managers, members of the media and an online fan voting system. Ljungberg received the most votes among fans, a testament to his popularity in the MLS. Ljungberg was also appointed captain of the 2009 MLS All-Star Team in their game over Everton.

Due to receiving a red card in the previous game, Ljungberg was ineligible to play the next Sounders game. As a result, All-Star coach Dominic Kinnear played Ljungberg for a full 90 minutes. At the end of the game, Ljungberg started to have impaired vision. When the game went to penalty kicks, he chose to sit it out due to his loss of vision after an on-set migraine. Unfortunately for Ljungberg, the initial five kicks ended in a draw. Kinnear, not fully understanding Ljungberg's condition, sent him out as the sixth kicker. Ljungberg, unable to see, took a chance and just tapped the ball in the center of the net. However, Tim Howard saved it, resulting in Everton winning. Immediately following the game, Ljungberg was removed from the field on a stretcher. Later, Ljungberg told reporters that he ingested trace amount of red wine while in Utah, resulting in his second migraine within months.

Ljungberg went on to win the U.S. Open Cup of 2009 with Seattle in September of that year.

=== Chicago Fire ===
Ljungberg was traded to Major League Soccer club Chicago Fire on 30 July 2010 in exchange for a second-round selection in the 2011 MLS SuperDraft. He made his team debut as a substitute in the club's 3–2 victory over the LA Galaxy the following Sunday. Ljungberg's first start for the Fire came against the New York Red Bulls in a match that featured five designated players. After 15 league appearances, Ljungberg announced that he would be leaving Chicago Fire at the end of the 2010 season.

=== Celtic ===
Ljungberg returned to Europe on 27 December 2010, when he joined Scottish Premier League outfit Celtic on a week-long trial. After a successful trial, Ljungberg officially signed a contract with the club on 30 December 2010. Ljungberg made his debut for Celtic away to Berwick Rangers in the Scottish Cup on 9 January 2011, playing over 60 minutes and helping his team to a 2–0 victory.

=== Shimizu S-Pulse ===
On 6 September 2011, Ljungberg signed for Japanese team Shimizu S-Pulse. He left the club by mutual consent on 14 February 2012.

Upon his release, Ljungberg was linked to Australian club Central Coast Mariners and South African team, Orlando Pirates. Meanwhile, he became a Premier League ambassador in which he promoted the league. He also participated in charitable events such as Soccer Aid 2012 and McDonald's Player Escort Program in Kyiv.

=== Retirement ===
On 24 August 2012, Ljungberg announced his retirement from football.

=== Mumbai City ===
On 25 July 2014, Ljungberg announced a comeback to promote the launch of the Indian Super League. On 2 September, he was signed by Mumbai City, becoming their marquee signing. Due to injury, he missed their involvement in the league's opening match, a 3–0 defeat at Atlético de Kolkata on 12 October. Ljungberg's comeback was cut short due to persistent back problems. After only four games played, he decided to end his contract and return to his home in London.

== International career ==
=== Youth ===
In 1996, Ljungberg made his debut for the Sweden national U-21 team. He almost did not make it as an international player because Sweden head coach Lars Lagerbäck thought Ljungberg was too short. In the 2003 documentary film Fredrik Ljungberg: Up Close, Lagerbäck stated: "Of course it's difficult to say at 15 to 16 years of age (whether or not a player has the potential to be an international player). To be honest, I wouldn't say I thought he would become an international player because he was very very little. In his first match, we played Denmark and he scored twice so he convinced me rather fast that he was a good player even if he was very very small but he was quick." On 10 November 1996, Ljungberg scored twice in a game against Scotland U21.

=== Senior ===
Ljungberg made his senior international debut on 24 January 1998 against the United States in Orlando, losing 0–1. He scored his first national team goal against Denmark in Malmö with a 3–0 victory. On 31 March 1999, Ljungberg scored his second national team goal against Poland in a 0–1 victory away from home in a UEFA Euro 2000 Qualifier match.

==== UEFA Euro 2000 ====
Ljungberg was a squad member for Sweden at UEFA Euro 2000 and played in all three group stage games against Belgium, Turkey, and Italy before Sweden was eliminated from the tournament after the group stage.

==== 2002 FIFA World Cup ====
During an open team practice before the 2002 FIFA World Cup, Ljungberg broke into a fight with teammate Olof Mellberg following a robust tackle from the latter. Ljungberg pushed Mellberg right in front of the world press and Mellberg responded by grabbing at Ljungberg's jersey top at throat level before the two wrestled on the ground. The two of them were quickly separated by shocked teammates and the team practice was immediately cancelled to deal with the public relations disaster. Within hours, video footage of the fight flooded the media and internet.

Sweden was a part of Group F, dubbed the 'Group of Death', which included Argentina, England and Nigeria. At the time, Ljungberg was suffering from a hip injury which prevented him from playing in most of the games. However, Ljungberg did muster the strength to play against England on 2 June 2002 and Nigeria on 7 June 2002 despite the pain. After Sweden advanced from group death, the team was defeated by Senegal.

==== UEFA Euro 2004 ====
Sweden were one of the 16 teams to qualify for UEFA Euro 2004 in Portugal. In Sweden's first game on 14 June, Ljungberg scored the opening goal as Sweden beat Bulgaria 5–0. He started the next two matches against Italy and Denmark, which both ended in draws. Sweden along with Italy and Denmark were in a three-way tie for the first spot. However, it was concluded that Italy would not advance due to a goal difference after Sweden and Denmark drew 2–2. Italy disputed the decision saying both Sweden and Denmark fixed the match. UEFA squashed that notion and Sweden moved onto the next round to compete against the Netherlands. The match ended with 0–0 draw in which Ljungberg attempted two shots but failed to score.

==== 2006 FIFA World Cup ====
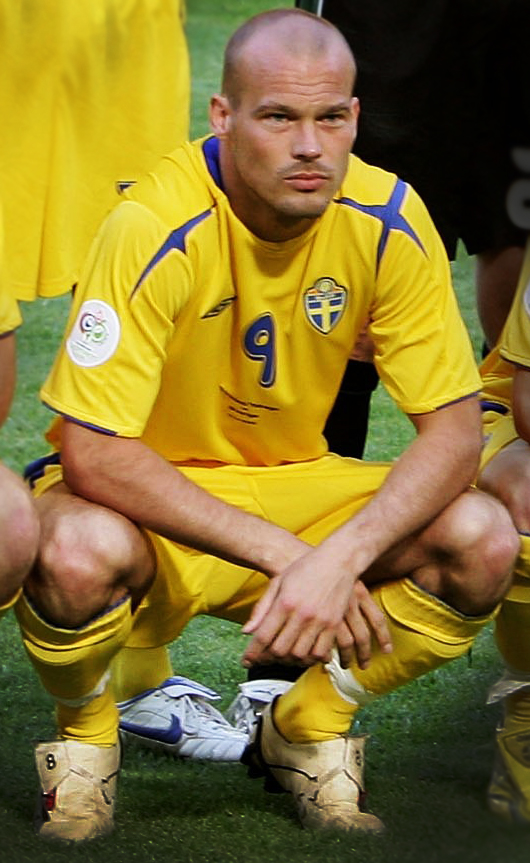
Ljungberg representing Sweden at the 2006 FIFA World Cup

Prior to the finals, the team doctor Magnus Forssblad prohibited Ljungberg from participating in full-blown training between matches to protect his injured foot. His right foot was swollen due to fluid building up inside his ankle joint. Ljungberg sat out the warm-up games against Finland and Chile at Sweden's base in Bremen. Despite being advised to take time off, Ljungberg insisted on playing in the cup to help Sweden win.

Sweden's weak start was quickly forgotten after their victory against Paraguay in the 2006 FIFA World Cup. However, Paraguay almost held out for a scoreless tie until Ljungberg scored in the 89th minute giving Sweden a 1–0 victory. Sweden's third match within the group was against England, resulting in a 2–2 draw. Despite the draw, Sweden advanced to the next round only to lose 0–2 against host nation Germany. Ljungberg received the Guldbollen award for helping Sweden advance to the next round in the World Cup by heading in the game-winning goal against Paraguay: "I am proud and humble to get this award," Ljungberg said. "If you look at the football year 2006, it was very eventful. ... If I should try to sum it up, the Champions League final left some deep marks. That felt heavy. But for me, the World Cup was the biggest event of the year."

==== UEFA Euro 2008 ====
After the 2006 World Cup, Ljungberg was made captain of Sweden. He captained the side in eight of the nine UEFA Euro 2008 qualifiers including games against Latvia, Liechtenstein, Spain, Northern Ireland, and Iceland. In the qualifiers, Ljungberg scored one goal against Liechtenstein on 17 October 2007 and had an assist in the Latvia match four days later. Sweden qualified for the European Championship with six wins.

Prior to UEFA Euro 2008, Ljungberg fractured his ribs, making his appearance in the tournament uncertain. However, Ljungberg was able to participate in the Euro and played the games with a special brace to protect his healing ribs. Ljungberg was able to start in Sweden's first match against Greece which ended in a 2–0 victory. Sweden's next match was against one of the favorites, Spain. Sweden were able to contain Spain who struggled from making big advances. However, Sweden lost that match 1–2.

Sweden was unable to compete with the young Russia squad and were defeated 0–2. Despite Sweden's early dismissal from the tournament, Ljungberg was considered by newspapers in Sweden, France, Italy, Germany and the host nation Austria as being Sweden's leading player throughout the competition.

==== Retirement ====
On 27 June 2008, Ljungberg announced that he was ending his ten-year career for the Sweden national team. The decision came following Sweden's early exit from UEFA Euro 2008. Ljungberg won 75 caps for Sweden, scoring 14 goals.

== Coaching career ==
=== Arsenal ===
In May 2013, Arsenal announced that Ljungberg would be "renewing his ties with the club" by taking an ambassadorial role with the view of increasing the international awareness of the club. He said that he was "honoured to take on this ambassadorial role".

On 12 July 2016, it was confirmed that he would be joining Arsenal Academy coaching Arsenal's under-15s.

=== VfL Wolfsburg ===
After the appointment of Andries Jonker as the new manager for VfL Wolfsburg on 27 February 2017, the club announced later the same day that he would be assisted by Ljungberg and Uwe Speidel. He was at the club for six months before Jonker and his assistants were sacked in September 2017.

=== Return to Arsenal ===
On 12 June 2018, Arsenal announced that Ljungberg would return as the under-23 coach. On 5 June 2019, Ljungberg was promoted to Arsenal's first-team coaching squad. On 29 November 2019, Ljungberg was announced as interim head coach following the dismissal of Unai Emery.

In December 2019 he said he was working on a game-by-game basis. His first match as interim head-coach ended in a 2–2 draw away to Norwich City on 1 December, and he achieved his first and only win, beating West Ham United 3-1 eight days later. After Mikel Arteta was appointed as club head-coach, Ljungberg was retained as the first-team assistant coach, after a record of one win, three draws and two defeats as interim head coach. On 22 August 2020 Ljungberg announced his departure from his first team assistant coaching role at Arsenal to progress his management experiences and pursue new opportunities.

=== Baller League UK ===
In November 2024, it was announced that he's set to manage one of the 12 teams in the upcoming Baller League UK, a six-a-side football league.

== Outside football ==
=== Endorsements ===
Ljungberg's work as a male model have garnered media attention rivaling that of his football career. In 2003, he signed a contract as an underwear model for Calvin Klein, fronting a worldwide campaign which became one of the company's most successful ever. However, Ljungberg was upset that, as a result, women persistently groped him in nightclubs.

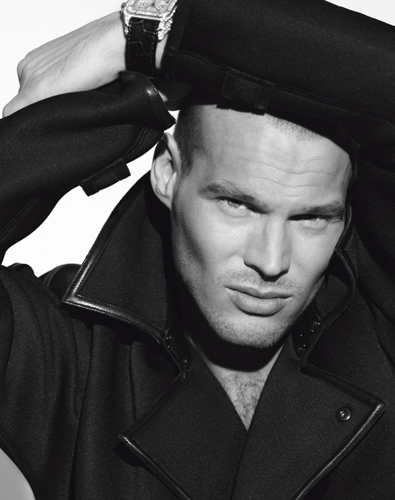
Ljungberg in a model shoot for a Swedish men's magazine Café.

Ljungberg was sponsored by sportswear company Nike and appeared in Nike commercials. In a global Nike advertising campaign in the run-up to the 2002 World Cup in Korea and Japan, he starred in a "Secret Tournament" commercial (branded "Scorpion KO") directed by Terry Gilliam, appearing alongside football players such as Ruud van Nistelrooy, Thierry Henry, Ronaldo, Edgar Davids, Fabio Cannavaro, Francesco Totti, Ronaldinho, Luís Figo and Hidetoshi Nakata, with former player Eric Cantona the tournament "referee".

=== Personal life ===
Ljungberg, who rarely talks about his personal life in the media, married long-time partner Natalie Foster, whom he met in 2007, on 9 June 2014 at a ceremony in front of the Natural History Museum. The daughter of a business executive, Foster is a fan of Arsenal's local rivals Tottenham Hotspur. They have two children.

Ljungberg is a Global Ambassador for Grassroot Soccer, an adolescent health organization that leverages the power of soccer to equip young people with the life-saving information, services, and mentorship they need to live healthier lives.

== Nicknames ==
While playing in England, Ljungberg became known as "Freddie", a nickname rarely used in his native Sweden. There, he is most commonly referred to by his birthname Fredrik, although teammates in the Sweden national team have sometimes referred to him by the nickname "Ljungan" (Swedish pronunciation: [ˈjɵ̂ŋan]), Swedish for “the heather ”. In an early stage in Arsenal he was also nicknamed "Kid Vicious", due to the punk hairstyle he had then.

== Career statistics ==
=== Club ===
Appearances and goals by club, season and competition
Club	Season	League			National Cup		League Cup		Continental		Other		Total	
Club	Season	Division	Apps	Goals	Apps	Goals	Apps	Goals	Apps	Goals	Apps	Goals	Apps	Goals
Halmstad	1994	Allsvenskan	1	0	—		—		—		—		1	0
Halmstad	1995	Allsvenskan	16	1	—		—		4	0	—		20	1
Halmstad	1996	Allsvenskan	20	2	—		—		3	0	—		23	2
Halmstad	1997	Allsvenskan	24	5	—		—		4	1	—		28	6
Halmstad	1998	Allsvenskan	18	2	—		—		2	0	—		20	2
Halmstad	Total		79	10	—		—		13	1	—		92	11
Arsenal	1998–99	Premier League	16	1	3	0	2	0	—		—		21	1
Arsenal	1999–2000	Premier League	26	6	2	0	—		14	2	—		42	8
Arsenal	2000–01	Premier League	30	6	5	1	—		13	2	—		48	9
Arsenal	2001–02	Premier League	25	12	5	2	—		9	3	—		39	17
Arsenal	2002–03	Premier League	20	6	4	1	—		8	2	—		32	9
Arsenal	2003–04	Premier League	30	4	4	4	—		9	2	—		43	10
Arsenal	2004–05	Premier League	26	10	6	2	—		6	2	—		38	14
Arsenal	2005–06	Premier League	25	1	1	0	1	0	9	1	—		36	2
Arsenal	2006–07	Premier League	18	0	3	1	—		5	1	—		26	2
Arsenal	Total		216	46	33	11	3	0	73	15	—		325	72
West Ham United	2007–08	Premier League	25	2	1	0	2	0	—		—		28	2
Seattle Sounders FC	2009	Major League Soccer	22	2	1	0	2	0	—		—		25	2
Seattle Sounders FC	2010	Major League Soccer	15	0	—		—		—		—		15	0
Seattle Sounders FC	Total		37	2	1	0	2	0	—		—		40	2
Chicago Fire	2010	Major League Soccer	15	2	—		—		—		—		15	2
Celtic	2010–11	Scottish Premier League	7	0	1	0	—		—		—		8	0
Shimizu S-Pulse	2011	J.League	8	0	—		—		—		—		8	0
Mumbai City	2014	Indian Super League	4	0	—		—		—		—		4	0
Career total			391	62	36	11	7	0	86	16	—		520	89

=== International ===
Appearances and goals by national team and year
National team	Year	Apps	Goals
Sweden	1998	6	1
Sweden	1999	7	1
Sweden	2000	8	0
Sweden	2001	9	0
Sweden	2002	5	0
Sweden	2003	4	1
Sweden	2004	10	4
Sweden	2005	7	5
Sweden	2006	8	1
Sweden	2007	6	1
Sweden	2008	5	0
Total		75	14

Scores and results list Sweden's goal tally first, score column indicates score after each Ljungberg goal.

List of international goals scored by Freddie Ljungberg
No.	Date	Venue	Cap	Opponent	Score	Result	Competition	Ref.
1	28 May 1998	Malmö Stadion, Malmö, Sweden	3	Denmark	1–0	3–0	Friendly	
2	31 March 1999	Stadion Śląski, Chorzów, Poland	8	Poland	1–0	1–0	UEFA Euro 2000 qualifying	
3	7 June 2003	Stadio Serravalle, Serravalle, San Marino	37	San Marino	3–0	6–0	UEFA Euro 2004 qualifying	
4	14 June 2004	Estádio José Alvalade, Lisbon, Portugal	41	Bulgaria	1–0	5–0	UEFA Euro 2004	
5	4 September 2004	Ta' Qali National Stadium, Ta' Qali, Malta	46	Malta	4–0	7–0	2006 FIFA World Cup qualification	
6	4 September 2004	Ta' Qali National Stadium, Ta' Qali, Malta	46	Malta	6–0	7–0	2006 FIFA World Cup qualification	
7	9 October 2004	Råsunda Stadium, Stockholm, Sweden	48	Hungary	1–0	3–0	2006 FIFA World Cup qualification	
8	9 February 2005	Stade de France, Saint-Denis, France	50	France	1–0	1–1	Friendly	
9	26 March 2005	Vasil Levski National Stadium, Sofia, Bulgaria	51	Bulgaria	1–0	3–0	2006 FIFA World Cup qualification	
10	26 March 2005	Vasil Levski National Stadium, Sofia, Bulgaria	51	Bulgaria	3–0	3–0	2006 FIFA World Cup qualification	
11	4 June 2005	Ullevi, Gothenburg, Sweden	52	Malta	5–0	6–0	2006 FIFA World Cup qualification	
12	3 September 2005	Råsunda Stadium, Stockholm, Sweden	53	Bulgaria	1–0	3–0	2006 FIFA World Cup qualification	
13	15 June 2006	Olympiastadion, Berlin, Germany	59	Paraguay	1–0	1–0	2006 FIFA World Cup	
14	13 October 2007	Rheinpark Stadion, Vaduz, Liechtenstein	68	Liechtenstein	1–0	3–0	UEFA Euro 2008 qualifying	

== Managerial statistics ==
As of match played 2 June 2025

Managerial record by team and tenure
Team	Nat	From	To	Record					Ref.
Team	Nat	From	To	P	W	D	L	Win %	Ref.
Arsenal U-23	(England)	1 July 2018	30 June 2019	26	12	7	7	46.15	
Arsenal (interim)	(England)	29 November 2019	21 December 2019	6	1	3	2	16.67	
N5 FC	(England)	24 March 2025	2 June 2025	11	1	1	9	9.09	
Total				43	14	11	18	32.56	

== Honours ==
Halmstad

- Allsvenskan: 1997

Arsenal

- Premier League: 2001–02, 2003–04
- FA Cup: 2001–02, 2002–03, 2004–05; runner-up: 2000–01
- FA Charity Shield: 1999
- UEFA Champions League runner-up: 2005–06

Seattle Sounders FC

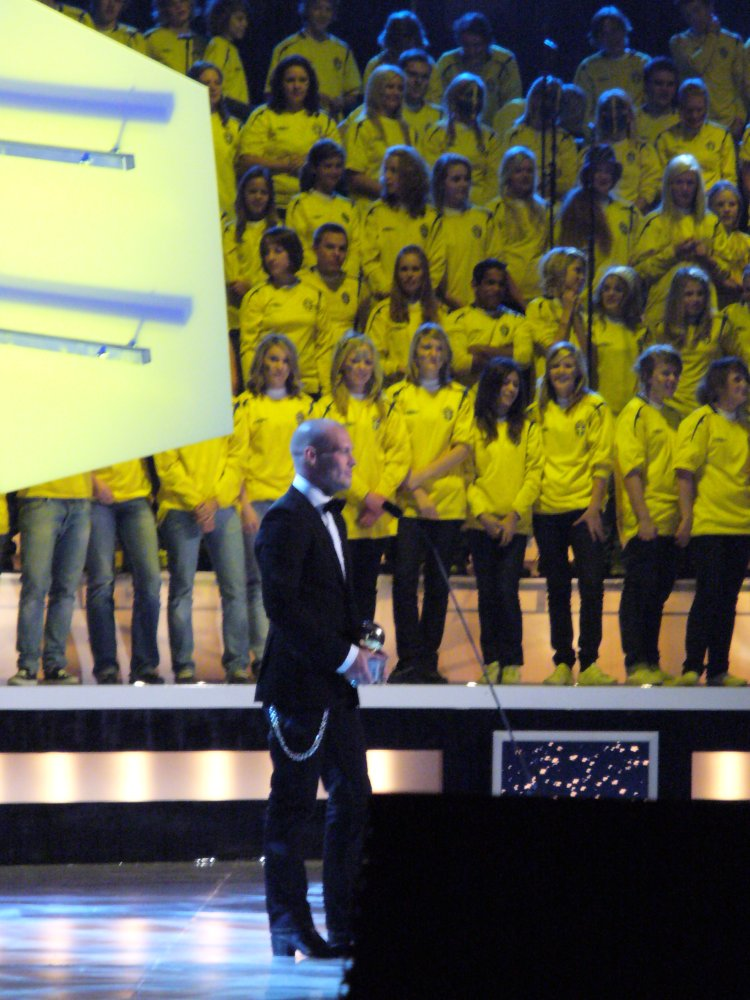
Ljungberg receiving the Guldbollen award in November 2006

- U.S. Open Cup: 2009

Individual

- Premier League Player of the Season: 2001–02
- Premier League Player of the Month: April 2002
- Premier League Overseas Team of the Decade: 1992–93 – 2001–02
- ESM Team of the Year: 2001–02
- Guldbollen: 2002, 2006
- Swedish Midfielder of the Year: 1998, 2001, 2002, 2003, 2004, 2005
- MLS Best XI: 2009
- MLS Player of the Month: October 2009
- Fotbollsgalan Folkets Lirare ("Fan's Player of the Year"): 1998
- Stor Grabb: 2000
