= 2002 FA Cup final =

English football match

2002 FA Cup Final
- The match programme cover
- Event: 2001–02 FA Cup
Arsenal	Chelsea
2	0
- Date: 4 May 2002
- Venue: Millennium Stadium, Cardiff
- Man of the Match: Freddie Ljungberg (Arsenal)
- Referee: Mike Riley (West Yorkshire)
- Attendance: 73,963
- Weather: Partly cloudy 12 °C (54 °F)

The 2002 FA Cup final was a football match between Arsenal and Chelsea on 4 May 2002 at the Millennium Stadium, Cardiff. It was the final match of the 2001–02 FA Cup, the 121st season of the world's oldest football knockout competition, the FA Cup. Arsenal were appearing in their fifteenth final to Chelsea's seventh.

As both teams were in the highest tier of English football, the Premier League, they entered the competition in the third round. Matches up to the semi-final were contested on a one-off basis, with a replay taking place if the match ended in a draw. Arsenal's progress was relatively comfortable; they knocked out the holders Liverpool in the fourth round, but needed a replay to beat Newcastle United. After overcoming replays in the first two rounds and a difficult tie against Preston North End, Chelsea recorded an impressive win against Tottenham Hotspur. Both teams won their semi-final match by a single goal.

Graeme Le Saux and Jimmy Floyd Hasselbaink were passed fit for Chelsea, but John Terry was omitted from the starting lineup, having woken up ill on the morning of the final. For Arsenal, goalkeeper David Seaman came in place of Richard Wright, who deputised for him in the earlier rounds of the competition. Chelsea were led onto the field by Roberto Di Matteo, who had been forced to retire from football earlier in the season due to a serious injury. After an uneventful first half, Chelsea settled much the quicker of the two and created several chances to score. Arsenal withstood the pressure and took the lead in the 70th minute, when Ray Parlour scored from 25 yards. Freddie Ljungberg scored from a similar distance ten minutes later to double Arsenal's lead. The final score was 2-0 and Arsenal won their eighth FA Cup.

The final took place with one week remaining in the Premier League calendar. Arsenal beat Manchester United a few days later to regain the league title and complete their second and final league and cup double under manager Arsène Wenger.

== Route to the final ==
The FA Cup is English football's primary cup competition. Clubs in the Premier League enter the FA Cup in the third round and are drawn randomly out of a hat with the remaining clubs. If a match is drawn, a replay comes into force, ordinarily at the ground of the team who were away for the first game. As with league fixtures, FA Cup matches are subject to change in the event of games being selected for television coverage and this often can be influenced by clashes with other competitions.

=== Arsenal ===
Round	Opposition	Score
3rd	Watford (a)	4–2
4th	Liverpool (h)	1–0
5th	Gillingham (h)	5–2
6th	Newcastle (a)	1–1
6th	Newcastle (h)	3–0
Semi-final	Middlesbrough (n)	1–0
Key: (h) = Home venue; (a) = Away venue; (n) = Neutral venue.

Arsenal entered the competition in the third round and was drawn to play Watford of the First Division. They took the lead in the eighth minute, where good play by Nwankwo Kanu allowed Thierry Henry to round goalkeeper Alec Chamberlain and tap the ball into the empty goal. The lead was doubled two minutes later: Kanu again found Henry, who "unselfishly squared the ball to midfielder Freddie Ljungberg for another tap-in." Gifton Noel-Williams moments later halved the scoreline, heading the ball in from a Gary Fisken cross. After squandering numerous chances to increase their lead, Arsenal added a late third and fourth goal from Kanu and Dennis Bergkamp, before Marcus Gayle scored what was a mere consolation for Watford in stoppage time.

In the following round, Arsenal faced cup holders Liverpool, who had defeated them in the previous season's final, at home. A solitary goal scored by Bergkamp in the 27th minute saw the home side progress and avenge their final defeat in a match layered with controversy: Martin Keown, Bergkamp and Liverpool's Jamie Carragher were all sent off in the space of ten minutes, the latter for hurling back a coin at the crowd. Against Gillingham in the fifth round, Arsenal twice had their lead cancelled out, before Tony Adams scored the winning goal of the match.

Arsenal played Newcastle United in the sixth round on 9 March 2002. It was the second meeting between both teams in a week, and in spite of Arsenal winning the first fixture and scoring the opener in the cup tie, Newcastle held them to a 1–1 draw. A replay was scheduled two weeks later at noon. Arsenal won by three goals to nil, but during the match lost Robert Pires to injury; he was ruled out for the remainder of the season with medial knee ligament damage. An own goal by Middlesbrough's Gianluca Festa, from an Henry free-kick, was enough for Arsenal to win the semi-final.

=== Chelsea ===
Round	Opposition	Score
3rd	Norwich City (a)	0–0
3rd	Norwich City (h)	4–0
4th	West Ham (h)	1–1
4th	West Ham (a)	3–2
5th	Preston North End (h)	3–1
6th	Tottenham (a)	4–0
Semi-final	Fulham (n)	1–0
Key: (h) = Home venue; (a) = Away venue; (n) = Neutral venue.

Chelsea's route to the final began in the third round, with a trip to Carrow Road to face Norwich City. An uneventful tie, with Carlo Cudicini making a series of saves to deny Norwich finished goalless and was replayed at Stamford Bridge. Goals from Mario Stanić and Frank Lampard put Chelsea in a commanding lead and Gianfranco Zola scored the team's third with a unique piece of skill. From a corner, the Italian made a near-post run and flicked the ball airborne. Chelsea finished the match 4–0 winners and were drawn to face West Ham United in the next round. Frédéric Kanouté's late goal cancelled out Jimmy Floyd Hasselbaink's opener for Chelsea and the tie was replayed at Upton Park the following Wednesday night. West Ham went a goal up when Jermain Defoe scored for West Ham, but their lead was short-lived as Hasselbaink directly from a free-kick. Defoe restored the home side's advantage in the 50th minute, though substitute Mikael Forssell came on to equalise for Chelsea and in stoppage time John Terry headed-in goalwards from a corner to complete the visitors comeback.

In the fifth round Chelsea played Preston North End at home. The visitors started well and took the lead in the sixth minute through Richard Cresswell. Cudicini's timely save denied Jon Macken from extending Preston's lead soon after and Chelsea responded to the setback with an equaliser, scored by Eiður Guðjohnsen. Chelsea led after 26 minutes, but came close to conceding late on when Macken was denied once again by Cudicini. Forssell then scored Chelsea's third to settle the home side's nerves.

Chelsea travelled to White Hart Lane to face Tottenham Hotspur in the sixth round. The team finished the tie as comfortable 4–0 winners, never looking as though they would crumble once William Gallas scored inside 12 minutes. The one negative from their performance was the dismissal of Graeme Le Saux for a second bookable offence in the second half. Local rivals Fulham were Chelsea's semi-final opponents. A scrappy match, which saw Fulham dominate much of the play but creating little, was settled in Chelsea's favour. Terry scored just before half time, heading the ball through the legs of Louis Saha standing in Fulham's goal.

== Pre-match ==
Arsenal were appearing in the final of the FA Cup for the fifteenth time, and for the second consecutive year. They had won the cup seven times previously (in 1930, 1936, 1950, 1971, 1979, 1993 and 1998) and were beaten in the final seven times, the most recent in last season's showpiece event. By comparison, Chelsea were making their seventh appearance in a FA Cup final. The club won the cup three times (1970, 1997 and 2000) and lost the same number of finals (1915, 1967 and 1994). Arsenal and Chelsea had previously met fourteen times in the FA Cup, including four replays. Arsenal had a slender advantage in those meetings, winning five times to Chelsea's four, and defeated their London rivals a season ago in the fifth round of the competition.

The most recent meeting between the two teams was in the Premier League on Boxing Day, when Arsenal came from behind to beat Chelsea. Arsenal were unbeaten domestically since December 2001 and on course to complete their first league and cup double in four years. Arsenal manager Arsène Wenger was buoyant his team would complete the task on hand: "We have been facing cup games in the league every week for a long time and this is just another. Chelsea will be a difficult team to beat if they are at their best on Saturday, but such is the confidence in this squad, we just feel we can win every game." When asked what he made of Sir Alex Ferguson's comments that Manchester United played the best football in England, Wenger retorted: "What do you want me to say? Everybody thinks he has the prettiest wife." The Arsenal manager was undecided whether to drop Richard Wright who started in every round of the FA Cup for David Seaman and to recall Sol Campbell who recovered from a hamstring injury.

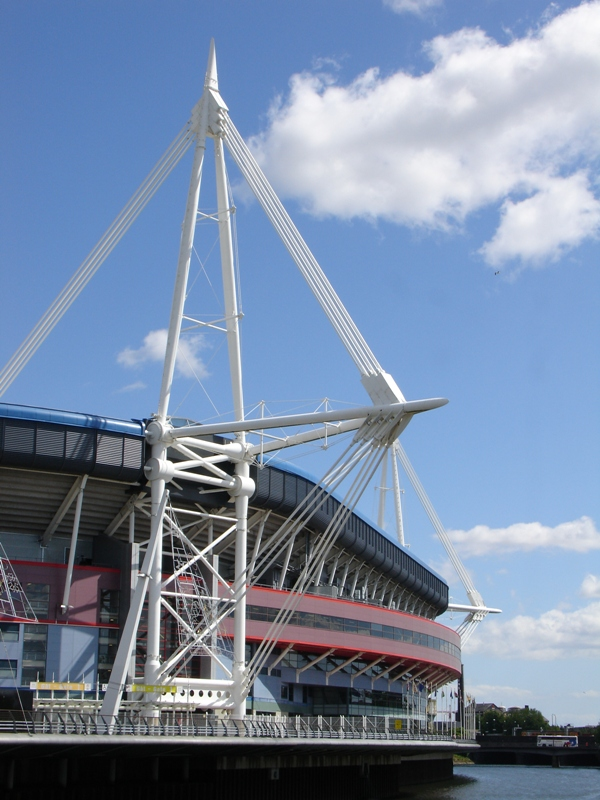
The final was staged at the Millennium Stadium for the second consecutive year.

Chelsea manager Claudio Ranieri felt his team's participation in the cup final showed "... we are building something. It gives the young players confidence." He noted their defence conceded fewer goals than the previous season, and targeted an improvement to their away record for the next campaign. Ranieri described the match against Arsenal as evenly balanced, adding: "Winning the FA Cup would make up for missing out on the Champions League. If the team can win, they will believe in themselves, but if they don't, it won't be the worst setback to the building process." Le Saux resumed training having been absent with a calf injury, but Hasselbaink was a doubt for the final with a similar problem.

The semi-finals at Villa Park and Old Trafford presented traffic problems and lengthy delays for supporters going to and from the grounds. The Mayor of London, Ken Livingstone had written to the FA, expressing his concern about the possible travel chaos and urging to be kept briefed on the arrangements. Train tickets were sold out since the semi-final round, despite the addition of services to accommodate 7,000 extra passengers. Both clubs laid on six planes to take its supporters directly to Cardiff at £135 each. Although the M4 was busy on the day of the final, there was little traffic with no major delays. A spokesman for South Wales Police reported: "The motorways are clear, despite the predictions. People seem to have taken our advice and left early."

As with last season's event, the final was scheduled before the end of the domestic season. This was partly because the Premier League chose to end its campaign a week later, but with the World Cup starting on 31 May, the FA wanted to give players considerable time to prepare for the finals. This season's staging of the competition offered a greater financial incentive to clubs, given the BBC and Sky Sports signed a joint-deal with the FA, worth £400 million to broadcast matches. Finalists stood to receive £1 million in prize money; the winners would pocket an extra million with additional TV revenues. The BBC spent a million promoting the FA Cup, and as part of their pre-match coverage included a sketch featuring Ricky Gervais. Seat prices for the final exceeded £70, with some ticket touts charging as much as £600 outside the stadium.

For their pre-match walkabout, the Arsenal players wore Hugo Boss suits, whereas the Chelsea players were suited in Armani. Chelsea were allocated the south dressing room after a coin-toss; it was considered a "jinx" given the last nine football teams to use it had failed to win. The teams emerged from the tunnel once the traditional pre-match anthem "Abide with Me" was performed and Chelsea were led by midfielder Roberto Di Matteo, who retired earlier in the season through injury. As the national anthem was sung by sextet Tenors and Divas, the Arsenal players and Wenger shuffled together and linked arms in a show of unity.

== Match ==
=== Team selection ===
On the day of the final Terry woke up with a virus which affected his balance. Although he passed a fitness test in the morning, Ranieri decided to start him on the bench, to which the defender later reflected: "It was a tough decision but he did what he felt was right. It seems like somebody up there doesn't like me." The teamsheets showed Gallas partnering Marcel Desailly in central defence, and Hasselbaink starting up front for Chelsea. Wright was named on the bench for Arsenal and Ray Parlour was positioned alongside Vieira in central midfield. Both teams lined up in a 4–4–2 formation: a four-man defence (comprising two centre-backs and left and right full-backs), four midfielders (two in the centre, and one on each wing) and two centre-forwards.

=== Summary ===
Within a minute of Chelsea kicking off the match, Le Saux was booked for a challenge on Lauren. Arsenal were awarded the first corner of the game in the eight minutes later, but nothing came out of it as Adams fouled Mario Melchiot in the penalty box. The opening half-hour was mostly event-free, with neither side dominating and few goalscoring opportunities fashioned. Chelsea adopted a tactic of narrowing the pitch and using little width, which sedated Arsenal's typically fluent football. Guðjohnsen tested the Arsenal defence by making dangerous runs, but one in the 12th minute was ruled as a foul. Arsenal's first chance came a minute later when Henry used his pace to run towards the Chelsea goal. He set up Sylvain Wiltord, whose shot was blocked by Desailly. Vieira struggled to match the energetic performance of his opponent Frank Lampard and in the 17th minute Vieira's careless pass was intercepted by the England midfielder. Lampard decided to take a shot, forcing a save from Seaman. Four minutes later Vieira started a move which almost gave Arsenal the lead. A ball over the top found Bergkamp in the Chelsea area, but he guided his header just wide. In the 26th minute Vieira was awarded the final's first yellow card for a foul on Guðjohnsen. A confrontation between Melchiot and Freddie Ljungberg occurred in the 33rd minute, but referee Mike Riley decided not to brandish a card, instead choosing to have a few words with the players. Campbell's failed clearance a minute later presented Guðjohnsen with goal-scoring opportunity, but he hit his shot directly at Seaman. As the match drew nearer to half-time, Arsenal started to find their rhythm and played their usual passing game. They created the best chance of the first half, when a cross from Wiltord found Lauren, who headed the ball just over the crossbar. Hasselbaink, largely ineffective as he was blighted with injury, combined with Guðjohnsen to split open the Arsenal defence, but the move was halted as Riley called offside.

Celestine Babayaro, who had been struggling with an injury, played no further part in the final and was substituted before the second half commenced. Terry came on in his place to partner Desailly, which meant Gallas moved to left-back. Arsenal resumed play and a shot by Henry was kept out by Cudicini. The scare brought Chelsea to life and resulted in the team enjoying their best spell of the match. Guðjohnsen's effort in the 57th minute forced a save from Seaman, who tipped the ball over the bar. Jesper Grønkjær then roamed forward and played the ball to Le Saux, but the defender's shot went well over. Chelsea continued to pile pressure on Arsenal; Grønkjær's pass intended for Hasselbaink in the 61st minute was intercepted just in time by Adams and Melchiot's header unsettled Seaman in goal. Wiltord then collected the ball from midfield and played a one-two with Henry, but directed his shot wide from the left flank. Chelsea made their second change in the 67th minute, bringing on Zola for Hasselbaink. The substitution did not have the desired effect as Arsenal went a goal ahead. Adams cleared the Chelsea danger and Wiltord's reverse pass found Parlour with acres of space to manoeuvre. The midfielder advanced as the Chelsea defence backed off and looked up before curling the ball from 25 yards. His effort went over a diving Cudicini, into the top right-hand corner of the Chelsea goal.

Wenger made a defensive-minded change almost immediately, taking Bergkamp off for Edu. A clash between Henry and Terry in the 75th minute resulted in both players receiving a yellow card for unsporting behaviour. Winger Boudewijn Zenden replaced Melchiot a minute later; the attacking change altered Chelsea's positioning. With 10 minutes of normal time remaining Arsenal extended their lead, when Ljungberg scored. A similarly executed goal to Parlour's, the Swede ran forward, evaded the challenge of Terry before curling the ball past Cudicini from the edge of the penalty area. Ljungberg was serenaded by the Arsenal crowd, who chanted "We love you Freddie, 'cos you've got red hair." Chelsea struggled to find a response; Guðjohnsen's foul on Parlour late on highlighted the team's frustrations. Riley blew for full-time after normal and stoppage time and the on-pitch interviews commenced. Once Arsenal received their medals, Adams was given the cup and he shared the honour of lifting it with Vieira, his stand-in captain.

=== Details ===
4 May 2002
15:00 BST

Arsenal	2–0	Chelsea
Parlour 70'; Ljungberg 80'	Report

Millennium Stadium, Cardiff
Attendance: 73,963
Referee: Mike Riley (West Yorkshire)

Arsenal	Chelsea

GK	1	(England) David Seaman
RB	12	(Cameroon) Lauren
CB	23	(England) Sol Campbell
CB	6	(England) Tony Adams (c)
LB	3	(England) Ashley Cole
RM	11	(France) Sylvain Wiltord		(substituted off) 89'
CM	15	(England) Ray Parlour
CM	4	(France) Patrick Vieira	(yellow card) 26'
LM	8	(Sweden) Freddie Ljungberg
SS	10	(Netherlands) Dennis Bergkamp		(substituted off) 72'
CF	14	(France) Thierry Henry	(yellow card) 75'	(substituted off) 81'
Substitutes:
GK	24	(England) Richard Wright
DF	2	(England) Lee Dixon
DF	5	(England) Martin Keown		(substituted on) 89'
MF	17	(Brazil) Edu		(substituted on) 72'
FW	25	(Nigeria) Nwankwo Kanu		(substituted on) 81'
Manager:
(France) Arsène Wenger

GK	23	(Italy) Carlo Cudicini
RB	15	(Netherlands) Mario Melchiot		(substituted off) 76'
CB	13	(France) William Gallas
CB	6	(France) Marcel Desailly (c)
LB	3	(Nigeria) Celestine Babayaro		(substituted off) 45'
RM	30	(Denmark) Jesper Grønkjær
CM	8	(England) Frank Lampard
CM	17	(France) Emmanuel Petit
LM	14	(England) Graeme Le Saux	(yellow card) 2'
CF	22	(Iceland) Eiður Guðjohnsen	(yellow card) 90+1'
CF	9	(Netherlands) Jimmy Floyd Hasselbaink		(substituted off) 68'
Substitutes:
GK	1	(Netherlands) Ed de Goey
DF	26	(England) John Terry	(yellow card) 75'	(substituted on) 45'
MF	10	(Federal Republic of Yugoslavia) Slaviša Jokanović
MF	11	(Netherlands) Boudewijn Zenden		(substituted on) 76'
FW	25	(Italy) Gianfranco Zola		(substituted on) 68'
Manager:
(Italy) Claudio Ranieri

Man of the match

- Freddie Ljungberg (Arsenal)

Match officials

- Assistant referees:
  - Glenn Turner (Derbyshire)
  - Ralph Bone (Kent)
- Fourth official: Mark Halsey (Lancashire)

Match rules

- 90 minutes.
- 30 minutes of extra-time if necessary.
- Penalty shoot-out if scores still level.
- Five named substitutes.
- Maximum of three substitutions.

=== Statistics ===
Statistic	Arsenal	Chelsea
Goals scored	2	0
Possession	56%	44%
Shots on target	4	5
Shots off target	6	3
Blocked shots	2	1
Corner kicks	5	4
Fouls	15	14
Offsides	5	2
Yellow cards	2	3
Red cards	0	0

== Post-match ==
Wenger praised his team's character and told reporters: "We were very frustrated last year. We have shown a lot of strength to come back here – beating Liverpool and Newcastle on the way." He was adamant Arsenal would win the league the following Wednesday: "This team knows how to win. I said three or four months ago that we will win the championship and the FA Cup. They really want to do it. And we will do it." The goalscorers Parlour and Ljungberg both agreed winning at any cost was most important on the day, after the misery of the 2001 final. Ranieri described the first half as tactical, but admitted once Arsenal had scored, Chelsea struggled to make a comeback. He justified his decision to include Hasselbaink, saying "He is a great striker and a danger to the opposition." Lampard credited Arsenal's mental strength: "They can win when they are not playing particularly well. We need to find that consistency and if we can do that, I believe we will be up there with them soon." He was pleased with his own performance against Vieira and hoped he did enough to be included in England's World Cup squad.

"People claim that Ranieri is not the right coach for Chelsea but he actually fits their tactical template completely: overseeing the odd cup run and continued under-achievement in the league. Classic Chelsea."

— Henry Winter's match report in The Daily Telegraph, 5 May 2002

Journalists and pundits reviewing the final unanimously agreed with the outcome of the match. Matt Dickinson wrote in The Times of 6 May 2002: "The force is with Arsenal, but it is not some ethereal presence, rather a brutish will to win derived from both triumphs and disappointments." The Daily Telegraph football correspondent Henry Winter was strongly critical of Ranieri's selection-making and suggested Chelsea's failure was partly down to Hasselbaink's lack of fitness, as there was no attacking threat. In contrast he commended Wenger's tactics – "The decision by Arsenal's intelligent manager to deploy Parlour through the middle was a spectacular success", and praised their players' mental strength and resilience. The Guardian's David Lacey also lauded Parlour's show in midfield, ranking his goal as one of the best in Cup final history. Although he agreed with the media consensus that the final was a drab affair and Arsenal's performance was not to their standard, he picked out several high-quality moments that the losing finalists failed to match, one in particular a timed-ball from Vieira. Glenn Moore of The Independent observed how Wenger turned his team of also-rans into winners, noting the manager's decision to play Adams "bore fruit" as the defence dealt with Chelsea's increasing second-half pressure. Football pundit Alan Hansen called Arsenal his team of the season and believed their win was built on the experience of Adams and Seaman; of the former he wrote: "Adams was also able to operate with the confidence that his goalkeeper was never going to make any mistakes."

The match was broadcast live in the United Kingdom by both the BBC and Sky Sports, with BBC One providing the free-to-air coverage and Sky Sports 2 being the pay-TV alternative. BBC One held the majority of the viewership, with an overnight peak audience of 7.4 million viewers – it received a final rating of 8.3 million. The match itself was watched by 6.3 million viewers (52% viewing share) and coverage of the final averaged at 4.1 million (44.4%). By comparison ITV's coverage of the 2002 UEFA Champions League Final averaged 6.8 million viewers, though with a lower viewing share (33.3%). The cup final ratings, a record low, were defended by the FA spokesman Paul Newman: "We are very pleased because the final peaked at 7.4m which is pretty good for a hot Saturday in the middle of a bank holiday weekend." A list compiled by the London Evening Standard showed the 2002 final came bottom in the season's top 10 viewed football matches.

Four days later Arsenal defeated Manchester United to complete their third double in the club's history. Arsenal paraded both trophies on an open-top bus once the season drew to a close; Dixon at Islington Town Hall addressed the crowd and personally thanked his staff, teammates and the club supporters. Chelsea's season ended with defeat to Aston Villa in the league. They moved down a place to sixth as a result of Leeds United's win against Middlesbrough.

== See also ==
- 2002 Football League Cup Final
- 2002 FA Trophy Final
- Arsenal F.C.–Chelsea F.C. rivalry
