= 2004–05 Arsenal F.C. season =

English football club season

Arsenal
2004–05 season
- Chairman: Peter Hill-Wood
- Manager: Arsène Wenger
- Stadium: Highbury
- Premier League: 2nd
- FA Cup: Winners
- League Cup: Quarter-finals
- FA Community Shield: Winners
- UEFA Champions League: Round of 16
- Top goalscorer: League: Thierry Henry (25); All: Thierry Henry (30)
- Highest home attendance: 38,164 vs Manchester United (1 February 2005)
- Lowest home attendance: 27,791 vs Everton (9 November 2004)
- Average home league attendance: 37,979 (in all competitions)
Home colours	Away colours	Third colours

The 2004–05 season was Arsenal Football Club's 13th season in the Premier League and their 79th consecutive season in the top flight of English football. The club ended the campaign as FA Cup winners, but failed to retain their Premier League title as they finished second to Chelsea. In the UEFA Champions League, Arsenal made an exit in the first knockout round to Bayern Munich.

In the transfer window Arsenal purchased goalkeeper Manuel Almunia, who initially served a backup to Jens Lehmann, and midfielder Mathieu Flamini. The club kept hold of its captain Patrick Vieira after much transfer speculation over his expected move to Real Madrid. Several players left Arsenal before the campaign got under way; defender Martin Keown left to play for Leicester City, Ray Parlour joined Middlesbrough while Sylvain Wiltord signed for Lyon.

Arsenal began the season in good form and equalled Nottingham Forest's unbeaten league run of 42 matches against Middlesbrough. The team set a new English division record and went a further seven games unbeaten before losing to Manchester United in controversial circumstances. Arsenal's form suffered as a result and defensive shortcomings became more apparent; two draws and a defeat in November reinforced Chelsea's position at the top of the table, where they remained for the rest of the season. At home to Crystal Palace in February 2005, Wenger named an Arsenal squad with no English players – a first in the club's history which attracted criticism from the media. The team ended the season strongly, with a run of eight wins from nine games ensuring a second-place finish. 32 different players represented the club in five competitions and there were 15 different goalscorers. Arsenal's top goalscorer was Thierry Henry, who scored 30 goals in 42 games.

== Background ==
Arsenal ended the previous season as league champions, becoming the first side since Preston North End 115 years earlier to do so undefeated. They completed their historic league campaign with 26 wins, 12 draws and 90 points.

By the end of January 2004, Arsenal were still in the hunt for all four trophies, but suffered setbacks in each of the cup competitions; they were unable to retain the FA Cup, losing out to eventual winners Manchester United in the semi-finals and days later were knocked out of the UEFA Champions League by Chelsea in the quarter-finals. They exited the League Cup after a defeat to Middlesbrough in early February.

=== Transfers ===
In

No.	Position	Player	Transferred from	Fee	Date	Ref
11	FW	Robin van Persie	Feyenoord	£2,750,000	1 July 2004	
24	GK	Manuel Almunia	Celta Vigo	Undisclosed	14 July 2004	
16	MF	Mathieu Flamini	Marseille	Undisclosed	22 July 2004	
27	DF	Emmanuel Eboué	Beveren	£1,500,000	7 January 2005	

Out

No.	Position	Player	Transferred to	Fee	Date	Ref
5	DF	Martin Keown	Leicester City	Free	20 July 2004	
15	MF	Ray Parlour	Middlesbrough	Free	23 July 2004	
25	FW	Nwankwo Kanu	West Bromwich Albion	Free	30 July 2004	
29	FW	Francis Jeffers	Charlton Athletic	£2,600,000	10 August 2004	
11	FW	Sylvain Wiltord	Lyon	Free	31 August 2004	
	MF	John Spicer	AFC Bournemouth	£10,000	17 December 2004	
	DF	Dominic Shimmin	Queens Park Rangers	Undisclosed	24 March 2005	
	GK	Chris Wright	Boston United	Undisclosed	29 May 2005	

== Pre-season ==
17 July 2004 Friendly	Barnet	1–10	Arsenal	London
			Reyes 19', 21', 42'; Van Persie 29'; Bergkamp 44', 67'; Jeffers 53', 55', 64'; Quincy Owusu-Abeyie 70'	Stadium: Underhill Stadium; Attendance: 4,674

22 July 2004 Friendly	Maribor	2–3	Arsenal	Maribor
			Bergkamp 4'; Aliadière 17'; Van Persie 84'	Stadium: Ljudski vrt Attendance: 5,000

24 July 2004 Friendly	Grazer AK	1–2	Arsenal	Graz
			Bergkamp 6'; Van Persie 57'	Stadium: UPC-Arena

28 July 2004 Friendly	Sturm Graz	0–2	Arsenal	Graz
			Reyes 30' (pen.); Jeffers 74'	Stadium: UPC-Arena; Attendance: 5,000

30 July 2004 Amsterdam Tournament	River Plate	0–0	Arsenal	Amsterdam
				Stadium: Amsterdam Arena; Attendance: 20,000

1 August 2004 Amsterdam Tournament	Ajax	0–0	Arsenal	Amsterdam
				Stadium: Amsterdam Arena; Attendance: 52,000

3 August 2004 Friendly	Boreham Wood	1–1	Arsenal	Borehamwood
			Stokes 47'	Stadium: Meadow Park; Attendance: 5,000

4 August 2004 Friendly	Beveren	0–0	Arsenal	Beveren
				Stadium: Freethiel Stadion

== FA Community Shield ==
The 2004 edition of the FA Community Shield, was contested between Manchester United and Arsenal at the Millennium Stadium on 8 August. Cesc Fàbregas started alongside Gilberto Silva in midfield for Arsenal as Vieira was absent, while Thierry Henry partnered Dennis Bergkamp up front. After a goalless first half, Arsenal took the lead when Gilberto scored in the 50th minute. Manchester United equalised through Alan Smith five minutes after, but José Antonio Reyes restored Arsenal's advantage two minutes before the hour mark. Mikaël Silvestre scored an own goal 11 minutes before the end to give Arsenal a 3–1 victory. Wenger praised Fàbregas's performance after the match, describing the midfielder as a "complete player" and reiterated his desire to keep Vieira.

8 August 2004 Final	Arsenal	3–1	Manchester United	Cardiff
15:00 BST	Gilberto Silva 50'; Reyes 58'; Silvestre 79' (o.g.)		Smith 55'	Stadium: Millennium Stadium; Attendance: 63,317; Referee: Mike Dean (Cheshire)

== Premier League ==
A total of 20 teams competed in the Premier League in the 2004–05 season. Each team played 38 matches; two against every other team and one match at each club's stadium. Three points were awarded for each win, one point per draw, and none for defeats. At the end of the season the top two teams qualified for the group stages of the UEFA Champions League; teams in third and fourth needed to play a qualifier. The provisional fixture list was released on 24 June 2004, but was subject to change in the event of clashes with other competitions, international football, inclement weather, or matches being selected for television coverage.

=== August–October ===
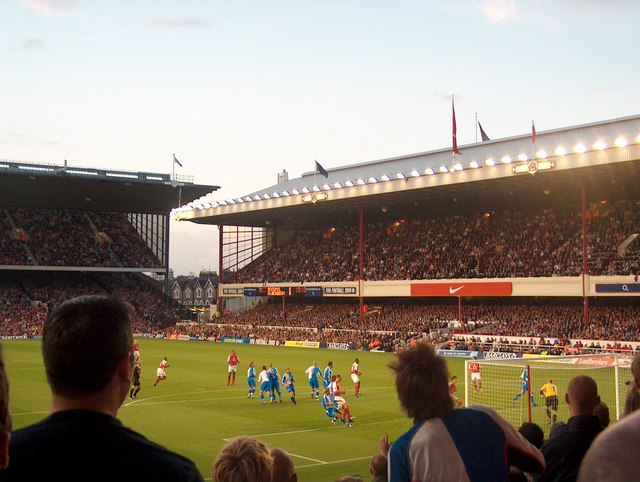
Goalmouth action at Highbury, where Arsenal played Blackburn Rovers in August 2004.

Arsenal began their defence of the league title against Everton on 15 August 2004. Fàbregas was named in the first eleven; at 17 years 103 days he became the club's youngest ever Premier League player. It was Bergkamp on his 500th league appearance who opened the scoring for Arsenal and Reyes made it 2–0, heading the ball in from Freddie Ljungberg's cross. Ljungberg added a third goal in the second half and in spite of the team conceding moments after, Robert Pires scored Arsenal's fourth in the 83rd minute. Shortly before the kick-off at home to Middlesbrough the following weekend, the club was presented a golden replica of the Premier League trophy, to commemorate their unbeaten season. In the match, Henry gave Arsenal the lead, which was cancelled out before half time by Joseph-Désiré Job's goal-bound effort. Four minutes after the interval, Franck Queudrue exploited an error from defender Pascal Cygan and in turn passed the ball to Jimmy Floyd Hasselbaink, who "finish[ed] with perfect brutality". Queudrue scored to put Middlesbrough 3–1 up in the 53rd minute, but Bergkamp replied with a goal for Arsenal a minute later. The home team completed the comeback with further goals by Reyes, Pires and Henry. Wenger afterwards admitted Arsenal's defending was poor, but said their attacking threat made up for their deficiencies. The 5–3 win meant Arsenal equalled Nottingham Forest's record of 42 league matches undefeated. Three days later, the team beat Blackburn Rovers 3–0 to set a new record. Arsenal at the end of the month travelled to Norwich City, where three first half goals set the team on the way to a 4–1 victory. The win ended Norwich's eight-month undefeated record at Carrow Road.

Due to international fixtures, Arsenal did not play another game for two weeks. On the resumption of club football, they travelled across London to face Fulham. Vieira made his return to the first team in place of Fàbregas. Fulham was awarded a penalty in the first half, after Ashley Cole brought down striker Andy Cole in the penalty area. Referee Mark Halsey however changed his mind after protests from the Arsenal players and a consultation with his assistant; the game was restarted with a dropped-ball. Arsenal scored three times in the second half and ended the weekend of 6 September 2004 top of the league table, two points clear of second place Chelsea. The league champions dropped their first points of the season at home to Bolton Wanderers. At the City of Manchester Stadium on 25 September 2004, a goal by Cole earned Arsenal a 1–0 win against Manchester City. Journalist Russell Thomas, writing for The Guardian, commented on Arsenal's fatigue during the second half and opined that the team needed to keep their focus against sterner opposition.

Arsenal beat Charlton Athletic in early October to extend their unbeaten run to 48 league matches. Charlton manager Alan Curbishley said of his opponents: "The gulf between Arsenal and the rest of the Premier League means that the rest have got it all to do to try and stop them, and I'm including the big three or four." Two goals from Pires and one from Henry ensured a 3–1 win against Aston Villa, who had led the game early on. Attention soon turned to Arsenal's trip to face Manchester United. The champions were looking to go half a century of league games unbeaten, whereas the home team – in transition, attempted to push on for a title challenge. The game saw many late aggressive tackles made by United players go unpunished and later in the match, an attempted challenge by Sol Campbell on Wayne Rooney earned Manchester United a controversial penalty, converted by Ruud van Nistelrooy in the 73rd minute. Rooney then scored United's second goal of the match to end Arsenal's unbeaten run on 49 games. Tempers boiled over in the players' tunnel, where pizza was thrown at Manchester United manager Sir Alex Ferguson. When speaking to the media, a distraught Wenger told reporters that Rooney dived to win the penalty and criticised the refereeing performance of Mike Riley. He was later found guilty of insinuating that Van Nistelrooy was a cheat, and fined £15,000 by the FA.

The final match of October was against Southampton at Highbury. Henry who missed a penalty early on, scored to put Arsenal in front in the 67th minute. Southampton replied with two goals from Rory Delap, but Van Persie in stoppage time equalised for the home team with a curling shot. The draw meant Arsenal stood in first position and had accumulated 26 points. The team were level on points with Chelsea, with a marginally better goal difference.

=== November–December ===
For the second league game in succession, Arsenal dropped two points. The team drew 1–1 at Crystal Palace on 6 November 2004, which meant Chelsea overtook them in first position. Wenger rued Arsenal's inability to hold onto leads in matches and admitted the fluency had disappeared in their football, possibly because of the manner in which they lost the unbeaten record. A week later Arsenal faced Tottenham Hotspur at White Hart Lane. It was Tottenham who began the match the better of the two teams and took the lead after 36 minutes when Noureddine Naybet scored. Henry equalised for Arsenal moments before half-time, and the champions went in front after Lauren converted a penalty. Vieira scored on the hour mark to make it 3–1, before Jermain Defoe replied for Tottenham instantly with a "wonderful, dipping finish into the top corner". Fàbregas created Arsenal's fourth goal, scored by Ljungberg. In the final 16 minutes Tottenham scored twice and Arsenal once; the final score was 5–4, making it the highest scoring North London derby. Arsenal's defending was ridiculed by Chelsea manager José Mourinho, who told reporters, "Five-four is a hockey score, not a football score."

"I do not think there is too much wrong but when you lose the errors are highlighted. I won't be making any major changes."

— Arsène Wenger after Arsenal's defeat to Liverpool, 28 November 2004.

Arsenal only managed a draw against West Bromwich Albion on 20 November 2004; Robert Earnshaw's goal with 11 minutes remaining of normal time cancelled out Pires' opener. Arsenal lost their final match of November, away to Liverpool at Anfield. Vieira finished off a one-touch move to equalise for Arsenal – who were behind in the first half – but Neil Mellor scored the winning goal of the game, shooting from long range. Football pundit Alan Hansen in his analysis on Match of the Day criticised the temperament of Arsenal's players and questioned their desire: "When you have success, sometimes it isn't there and you have to dig in with great determination and hard work, and at the moment they are not doing that. When you look at their two big players, Henry and Vieira, [you think they] must do better in future." Arsenal ended the month in second, five points behind leaders Chelsea.

Henry scored two late goals in Arsenal's victory over Birmingham City on 4 December 2004. Wenger replaced Lehmann in goal with Almunia, who made his league debut. Arsenal then faced league leaders Chelsea at Highbury; with Vieira suspended and Gilberto and Edu injured, Wenger picked Flamini to partner Fabregas in midfield. The first chance of the match went to Henry, who scored inside 75 seconds. John Terry levelled the score, but Henry restored Arsenal's lead from a contentious free-kick – Graham Poll allowed the striker to take it quickly without warning the Chelsea players. Eiður Guðjohnsen equalised early in the second half for Chelsea, and late on Henry missed a chance to score a hat-trick. There were no further goals and the match ended 2–2, meaning Chelsea remained five points clear of Arsenal. Wenger said he was disappointed in the manner his team conceded to Chelsea – from two set pieces, but added, "I thought we did really well, and it was important for us to come back to the level we want to be at."

Arsenal won their remaining games in December and conceded no goals. They beat Portsmouth courtesy of a Campbell goal in the second half, and on Boxing Day defeated Fulham by two goals. Vieira scored the winning goal against Newcastle United, a volley that deflected over goalkeeper Shay Given. After 20 games, Arsenal accumulated 44 points and lay second in the league table.

=== January–February ===
On New Year's Day, Ljungberg scored two goals in Arsenal's 3–1 win against Charlton Athletic. The team four days later drew at home to Manchester City. Arsenal lost further ground to Chelsea after defeat to Bolton Wanderers at the Reebok Stadium. Wenger conceded that Chelsea were favourites to win the league because of their point advantage, but added: "We will keep going and fight until the last minute of the championship." Arsenal ended January with a 1–0 home win against Newcastle United. Wenger made four changes from the Bolton defeat, with Bergkamp the match scorer coming in place of Van Persie.

The first night of February saw Arsenal host Manchester United at Highbury. In the tunnel before the match Roy Keane was seen confronting Vieira; the United captain accused him of intimidating his teammate Gary Neville. Vieira scored after eight minutes, but Giggs equalised for Manchester United 10 minutes later. Bergkamp restored Arsenal's advantage nine minutes before half time, but two goals by Cristiano Ronaldo and one by John O'Shea in the second half gave United a 4–2 win. It was Arsenal's fourth league defeat of the season and moved them down to third spot, overtaken by their opponents. Wenger ruled his team out of the title race and refused to blame Almunia for his error in Ronaldo's first goal. The goalkeeper was dropped in Arsenal's next game, away to Aston Villa. Three first half goals by Ljungberg, Henry and Cole gave Arsenal a comfortable win.

For the match against Crystal Palace on 14 February 2005, Wenger named an Arsenal squad that did not feature a single British player – a first in the club's history. The team did not get off to the best of starts with Lehmann miskicking a back pass and Vieira losing possession routinely, but grew as the game went on and scored three goals in seven minutes. On his 200th league appearance, Henry scored in either half, with the result 5–1 to Arsenal. The result was somewhat overshadowed by the foreign makeup of the team; former player Paul Merson called it a "joke" and PFA chairman Gordon Taylor noted it was a "worrying pattern for English football". When asked about his team selections, Wenger said: "I don't look at the passport of people, I look at their quality and their attitude."

Arsenal only earned a point at Southampton, where Van Persie was sent off for a late challenge on Graeme Le Saux. The team remained in third at the end of February, four points behind Manchester United and 10 behind leaders Chelsea, who played a game less than both challengers.

=== March–May ===
Arsenal's form improved as the season drew to a close. At home to Portsmouth on 5 March 2005, the team earned three points courtesy of Henry's hat-trick. Van Persie scored the only goal in Arsenal's match against Blackburn Rovers and the team moved back to second position with a home win against Norwich City – Henry scored another hat-trick. A week later Pires' goal was enough for Arsenal to beat Middlesbrough at the Riverside Stadium and win their fourth consecutive match. The team then played out a goalless draw against Chelsea, who were on course to become champions; Wenger congratulated his opponents on their season and felt Arsenal needed to score first so that they could "force them to come out from the back."

Arsenal defeated Tottenham 1–0 on 25 April 2005, which meant Chelsea needed to wait on Saturday in order to mathematically win the title. Second position was the best Arsenal could aim for by the time they faced West Bromwich Albion on 2 May 2005. Goals from Van Persie and Edu earned a 2–0 win for the team and Arsenal beat Champions League finalists Liverpool at Highbury to all-but secure second spot. Arsenal recorded the biggest win of the league season, against Everton at Highbury. An inspired performance by Bergkamp helped the team win 7–0; he created the opening two goals and scored in the second half. Arsenal lost their final game of the campaign, away to Birmingham City. It was a lacklustre performance by the visitors, who equalised through Bergkamp after going a goal behind, but conceded in the 90th minute.

=== Matches ===
15 August 2004 1	Everton	1–4	Arsenal	Liverpool
14:00 BST	Carsley (yellow card) 37', (goal) 64'; Osman (yellow card) 43'	Report	Bergkamp 23'; Reyes 39'; Cole (yellow card) 53'; Ljungberg 54'; Pires 83'	Stadium: Goodison Park; Attendance: 35,521; Referee: Mike Riley

22 August 2004 2	Arsenal	5–3	Middlesbrough	London
16:05 BST	Henry 25', 90'; Bergkamp 54'; Pires 65'; Reyes 65'	Report	Job 43'; Hasselbaink 50'; Queudrue 53'	Stadium: Highbury; Attendance: 37,415; Referee: S Dunn

25 August 2004 3	Arsenal	3–0	Blackburn Rovers	London
19:45 BST	Henry 50'; Fàbregas 58'; Reyes 79'	Report		Stadium: Highbury; Attendance: 37,496; Referee: Neale Barry

28 August 2004 4	Norwich City	1–4	Arsenal	Norwich
17:15 BST	Huckerby 50' (pen.)	Report	Reyes 22'; Henry 36'; Pires 40'; Bergkamp 90+3'	Stadium: Carrow Road; Attendance: 23,944; Referee: Graham Poll

11 September 2004 5	Fulham	0–3	Arsenal	London
15:00 BST		Report	Ljungberg 62'; Knight 65' (o.g.); Reyes 71'	Stadium: Craven Cottage; Attendance: 21,681; Referee: Mark Halsey

18 September 2004 6	Arsenal	2–2	Bolton Wanderers	London
12:45 BST	Henry 31'; Pires 66'	Report	Jaïdi 63'; Pedersen 85'	Stadium: Highbury; Attendance: 37,010; Referee: Phil Dowd

25 September 2004 7	Manchester City	0–1	Arsenal	Manchester
15:00 BST		Report	Cole 14'	Stadium: City of Manchester Stadium; Attendance: 47,015; Referee: Neale Barry

2 October 2004 8	Arsenal	4–0	Charlton Athletic	London
15:00 BST	Ljungberg 33'; Henry 48', 69'; Reyes 70'	Report		Stadium: Highbury; Attendance: 38,103; Referee: Mike Dean

16 October 2004 9	Arsenal	3–1	Aston Villa	London
15:00 BST	Pires 19' (pen.), 72'; Henry 45+1'	Report	Hendrie 3'	Stadium: Highbury; Attendance: 38,137; Referee: Graham Poll

24 October 2004 10	Manchester United	2–0	Arsenal	Manchester
16:05 BST	G. Neville (yellow card) 36'; P. Neville (yellow card) 38'; Van Nistelrooy 73' (pen.); Rooney 90+3'	Report	Cole (yellow card) 35'; Vieira (yellow card) 75'; Edu (yellow card) 79'	Stadium: Old Trafford; Attendance: 67,862; Referee: Mike Riley

30 October 2004 11	Arsenal	2–2	Southampton	London
15:00 BST	Henry 67'; Van Persie 90+2'	Report	Delap 80', 85'	Stadium: Highbury; Attendance: 38,141; Referee: Matt Messias

6 November 2004 12	Crystal Palace	1–1	Arsenal	London
17:15 GMT	Riihilahti 65'	Report	Henry 63'	Stadium: Selhurst Park; Attendance: 26,193; Referee: Mike Dean

13 November 2004 13	Tottenham Hotspur	4–5	Arsenal	London
12:00 GMT	Naybet 37'; Defoe 61'; King 74'; Kanouté 88'	Report	Henry 45+1'; Lauren 55' (pen.); Vieira 60'; Ljungberg 69'; Pires 81'	Stadium: White Hart Lane; Attendance: 36,095; Referee: Steve Bennett

20 November 2004 14	Arsenal	1–1	West Bromwich Albion	London
15:00 GMT	Pires 54'	Report	Earnshaw 79'	Stadium: Highbury; Attendance: 38,109; Referee: Howard Webb

28 November 2004 15	Liverpool	2–1	Arsenal	Liverpool
16:05 GMT	Alonso 41'; Mellor 90+2'	Report	Vieira 56'	Stadium: Anfield; Attendance: 43,730; Referee: Alan Wiley

4 December 2004 16	Arsenal	3–0	Birmingham City	London
15:00 GMT	Pires 33'; Henry 80', 86'	Report		Stadium: Highbury; Attendance: 38,064; Referee: Dermot Gallagher

12 December 2004 17	Arsenal	2–2	Chelsea	London
16:05 GMT	Henry 2', 29'	Report	Terry 17'; Guðjohnsen 46'	Stadium: Highbury; Attendance: 38,153; Referee: Graham Poll

19 December 2004 18	Portsmouth	0–1	Arsenal	Portsmouth
16:05 GMT		Report	Campbell 75'	Stadium: Fratton Park; Attendance: 20,170; Referee: Howard Webb

26 December 2004 19	Arsenal	2–0	Fulham	London
13:00 GMT	Henry 12'; Pires 71'	Report		Stadium: Highbury; Referee: Barry Knight

29 December 2004 20	Newcastle United	0–1	Arsenal	Newcastle upon Tyne
20:00 GMT		Report	Vieira 45+1'	Stadium: St James' Park; Attendance: 52,320; Referee: Steve Bennett

1 January 2005 21	Charlton Athletic	1–3	Arsenal	London
15:00 GMT	El Karkouri 45'	Report	Ljungberg 35', 48'; Van Persie 67'	Stadium: The Valley; Referee: Mark Halsey

4 January 2005 22	Arsenal	1–1	Manchester City	London
19:45 GMT	Ljungberg 75'	Report	Wright-Phillips 31'	Stadium: Highbury; Attendance: 38,086; Referee: Rob Styles

15 January 2005 23	Bolton Wanderers	1–0	Arsenal	Bolton
17:15 GMT	Giannakopoulos 41'	Report		Stadium: Reebok Stadium; Attendance: 27,514; Referee: Mark Clattenburg

23 January 2005 24	Arsenal	1–0	Newcastle United	London
16:05 GMT	Bergkamp 19'	Report		Stadium: Highbury; Attendance: 38,137; Referee: Steve Dunn

1 February 2005 25	Arsenal	2–4	Manchester United	London
20:00 GMT	Vieira 8'; Bergkamp 36'	Report	Giggs 18'; Ronaldo 54', 58'; Silvestre (red card) 69'; O'Shea 89'	Stadium: Highbury; Attendance: 38,164; Referee: Graham Poll

5 February 2005 26	Aston Villa	1–3	Arsenal	Birmingham
17:15 GMT	Ángel 74'	Report	Ljungberg 10'; Henry 14'; Cole 28'	Stadium: Villa Park; Attendance: 42,593; Referee: Steve Bennett

14 February 2005 27	Arsenal	5–1	Crystal Palace	London
20:00 GMT	Bergkamp 32'; Reyes 35'; Henry 39', 77'; Vieira 54'	Report	A. Johnson 63' (pen.)	Stadium: Highbury; Attendance: 38,056; Referee: Rob Styles

26 February 2005 28	Southampton	1–1	Arsenal	Southampton
12:45 GMT	Prutton (yellow card) 35' (yellow-red card) 45'; Crouch 67'	Report	Ljungberg 45+4'; Van Persie (red card) 52'	Stadium: St Mary's Stadium; Attendance: 31,815; Referee: Alan Wiley

5 March 2005 29	Arsenal	3–0	Portsmouth	London
15:00 GMT	Henry 39', 53', 85'	Report		Stadium: Highbury; Attendance: 38,079; Referee: Chris Foy

19 March 2005 30	Blackburn Rovers	0–1	Arsenal	Blackburn
12:45 GMT		Report	Van Persie 43'	Stadium: Ewood Park; Attendance: 22,992; Referee: Graham Poll

2 April 2005 31	Arsenal	4–1	Norwich City	London
15:00 BST	Henry 19', 22', 66'; Ljungberg 50'	Report	Huckerby 30'	Stadium: Highbury; Attendance: 38,066; Referee: Alan Wiley

9 April 2005 32	Middlesbrough	0–1	Arsenal	Middlesbrough
15:00 BST		Report	Pires 73'	Stadium: Riverside Stadium; Attendance: 33,874; Referee: Phil Dowd

20 April 2005 33	Chelsea	0–0	Arsenal	London
20:00 BST		Report		Stadium: Stamford Bridge; Attendance: 41,621; Referee: Steve Bennett

25 April 2005 34	Arsenal	1–0	Tottenham Hotspur	London
20:00 BST	Reyes 22'	Report		Stadium: Highbury; Attendance: 38,147; Referee: Mike Riley

2 May 2005 35	West Bromwich Albion	0–2	Arsenal	West Bromwich
20:00 BST		Report	Van Persie 66'; Edu 90+2'	Stadium: The Hawthorns; Attendance: 27,351; Referee: Neale Barry

8 May 2005 36	Arsenal	3–1	Liverpool	London
16:05 BST	Pires 25'; Reyes 29'; Fàbregas 90+4'	Report	Gerrard 51'	Stadium: Highbury; Attendance: 38,119; Referee: Graham Poll

11 May 2005 37	Arsenal	7–0	Everton	London
20:00 BST	Van Persie 8'; Pires 12', 50'; Vieira 37'; Edu 70' (pen.); Bergkamp 77'; Flamini 85'	Report		Stadium: Highbury; Attendance: 38,073; Referee: Alan Wiley

15 May 2005 38	Birmingham City	2–1	Arsenal	Birmingham
15:00 BST	Pandiani 80'; Heskey 90'	Report	Bergkamp 88'	Stadium: St. Andrew's; Attendance: 29,302; Referee: Dermot Gallagher

=== Classification ===
Pos	Team	Pld	W	D	L	GF	GA	GD	Pts	Qualification or relegation
1	Chelsea (C)	38	29	8	1	72	15	+57	95	Qualification for the Champions League group stage
2	Arsenal	38	25	8	5	87	36	+51	83	Qualification for the Champions League group stage
3	Manchester United	38	22	11	5	58	26	+32	77	Qualification for the Champions League third qualifying round
4	Everton	38	18	7	13	45	46	−1	61	Qualification for the Champions League third qualifying round
5	Liverpool	38	17	7	14	52	41	+11	58	Qualification for the Champions League first qualifying round (Note: Although they failed to qualify for the Champions League as one of the top four English clubs, Liverpool were given a special dispensation to compete as the defending champions. They were, however, forced to enter in the first qualifying round.)

Rules for classification: 1) points; 2) goal difference; 3) number of goals scored.
(C) Champions

==== Results summary ====
Overall								Home						Away					
Pld	W	D	L	GF	GA	GD	Pts	W	D	L	GF	GA	GD	W	D	L	GF	GA	GD
38	25	8	5	87	36	+51	83	13	5	1	54	19	+35	12	3	4	33	17	+16

==== Results by round ====
Round	1	2	3	4	5	6	7	8	9	10	11	12	13	14	15	16	17	18	19	20	21	22	23	24	25	26	27	28	29	30	31	32	33	34	35	36	37	38
Result	W	W	W	W	W	D	W	W	W	L	D	D	W	D	L	W	D	W	W	W	W	D	L	W	L	W	W	D	W	W	W	W	D	W	W	W	W	L
Position	1	1	1	1	1	1	1	1	1	1	1	2	2	2	2	2	3	2	2	2	2	2	2	2	3	3	3	3	3	3	2	2	2	2	2	2	2	2

W = Win; D = Draw; L = Loss

== FA Cup ==
Arsenal entered the competition in the third round, by virtue of their Premier League status. Their opening match was a home tie against Stoke City. The visitors took the lead just before the break, but goals from Reyes and Van Persie in the second half meant Arsenal won 2–1. They then faced Wolverhampton Wanderers at home in the next round; a goal apiece from Vieira and Ljungberg secured a comfortable 2–0 victory.

Arsenal's opponent in the fifth round was Sheffield United. After 35 minutes Bergkamp was sent off for his apparent push on Cullip. With eleven minutes of normal time remaining, Robert Pires scored for Arsenal, but the team conceded a late penalty which Andy Gray converted. The equaliser for Sheffield United meant the match was replayed at Bramall Lane on 1 March 2005. Both teams played out a goalless draw after full-time and throughout extra-time, so the tie was decided by a penalty shootout. Almunia saved two penalties, which ensured progress into the quarter-finals.

Bolton Wanderers hosted Arsenal at the Reebok Stadium in the sixth round of the competition. Ljungberg scored the only goal of the tie after just three minutes; he had an opportunity to extend Arsenal's lead in stoppage time, but hit the ball over from six yards. Arsenal faced Blackburn Rovers in the semi-final which was played at the Millennium Stadium. Two goals from Van Persie and one from Pires gave Arsenal a 3–0 win, in a match marred by Blackburn's aggressive tactics.

This set up a showdown with Manchester United in the final on 21 May 2005. United were on top for long periods of the game but Arsenal resisted their pressure and the match ended 0–0 after 120 minutes, albeit Arsenal were a man lighter after Reyes' dismissal with a minute remaining for two bookable offences. The match went to penalties with all the penalty takers converting barring Paul Scholes, whose effort was denied by Lehmann. Vieira converted the final and winning spot-kick to seal a tenth FA Cup crown for Arsenal.

9 January 2005 Third round	Arsenal	2–1	Stoke City	London
14:00 GMT	Reyes 50'; Van Persie 70'	Report	Thomas 44'	Stadium: Highbury; Attendance: 36,579; Referee: Neale Barry (Lincolnshire)

29 January 2005 Fourth round	Arsenal	2–0	Wolverhampton Wanderers	London
15:00 GMT	Vieira 53' (pen.); Ljungberg 82'	Report		Stadium: Highbury; Attendance: 37,153; Referee: Mike Riley (Leeds)

19 February 2005 Fifth round	Arsenal	1–1	Sheffield United	London
12:30 GMT	Pires 78'	Report	Gray 90' (pen.)	Stadium: Highbury; Attendance: 36,891; Referee: Neale Barry (Lincolnshire)

1 March 2005 Fifth round replay	Sheffield United	0–0 (a.e.t.) (2–4 p)	Arsenal	Sheffield
20:05 GMT		Report		Stadium: Bramall Lane; Attendance: 27,595; Referee: Phil Dowd (Staffordshire)
	Penalties
	Gray (penalty scored); Jagielka (penalty scored); Quinn (penalty missed); Harley (penalty missed)		(penalty scored) Lauren; (penalty scored) Vieira; (penalty scored) Ljungberg; (penalty scored) Cole

12 March 2005 Sixth round	Bolton Wanderers	0–1	Arsenal	Bolton
12:15 GMT		Report	Ljungberg 3'	Stadium: Reebok Stadium; Attendance: 23,523; Referee: Steve Bennett (Kent)

16 April 2005 Semi-finals	Arsenal	3–0	Blackburn Rovers	Cardiff
12:15 BST	Pires 42'; Van Persie 86', 90'	Report		Stadium: Millennium Stadium; Attendance: 52,077; Referee: Steve Dunn (Gloucestershire)

21 May 2005 Final	Arsenal	0–0 (a.e.t.) (5–4 p)	Manchester United	Cardiff
15:00 BST		Report		Stadium: Millennium Stadium; Attendance: 71,876; Referee: Rob Styles (Hampshire)
	Penalties
	Lauren (penalty scored); Ljungberg (penalty scored); Van Persie (penalty scored); Cole (penalty scored); Vieira (penalty scored)		(penalty scored) Van Nistelrooy; (penalty missed) Scholes; (penalty scored) Ronaldo; (penalty scored) Rooney; (penalty scored) Keane

== Football League Cup ==
The Football League Cup is a cup competition open to clubs in the Premier League and Football League. Like the FA Cup it is played on a knockout basis, with the exception of the second round and semi-finals, which are contested over a two-legged tie. Together with the other clubs playing in European competitions, Arsenal entered the Football League Cup in the third round. The team were drawn to face Manchester City, on the week of 25 October 2004. Wenger fielded a relatively young team for the tie, which took the lead in the second half when Van Persie scored. Danny Karbassiyoon extended the visitor's lead in the 90th minute, just before Manchester City striker Robbie Fowler scored from a free-kick.

In the fourth round, Arsenal faced Everton at Highbury. The team went behind after eight minutes of play, but Quincy Owusu-Abeyie levelled the scoreline and in the second half Arturo Lupoli scored twice. Wenger was pleased with how his team responded to the setback and added: "They played intelligently, technically well and with the spirit we like to play the game." Arsenal bowed out of the competition away to Manchester United; the only goal of the match came inside 19 seconds when David Bellion profited from an error by goalkeeper Almunia.

27 October 2004 Third round	Manchester City	1–2	Arsenal	Manchester
19:45 BST	Fowler 90+4'	Report	Van Persie 78'; Karbassiyoon 90+1'	Stadium: City of Manchester Stadium; Attendance: 21,708; Referee: Peter Walton (Northamptonshire)

9 November 2004 Fourth round	Arsenal	3–1	Everton	London
19:45 GMT	Quincy 25'; Lupoli 52', 85'	Report	Gravesen 8'	Stadium: Highbury; Attendance: 27,791; Referee: Alan Wiley (Staffordshire)

1 December 2004 Quarter-finals	Manchester United	1–0	Arsenal	Manchester
19:45 GMT	Bellion 1'	Report		Stadium: Old Trafford; Attendance: 67,103; Referee: Mark Halsey (Lancashire)

== UEFA Champions League ==
=== Group stage ===
Arsenal were drawn in Group E, along with Dutch champions PSV, Greek club Panathinaikos and Norwegian side Rosenborg. An Alex own goal was enough for Arsenal to claim three points against PSV on the first matchday. The team drew away to Rosenborg and earned a point at Panathinaikos, despite twice having taken the lead at the Leoforos Alexandras Stadium. In the reverse fixture, Cygan scored an own goal to cancel out Henry's first-half opener; the result left Arsenal in second position. Their next match was against PSV at the Philips Stadion, where after eight minutes the home side took the lead. Henry equalised for Arsenal, having created the chance following a one-two with Ljungberg. In the second half Lauren and Vieira were both sent off, for two bookable offences. Wenger accepted referee Herbert Fandel's decision, but added his surprise that Mark van Bommel was not cautioned: "If you look at the number of fouls he made without being punished it is very surprising because he made some deliberate fouls. Some people might criticise Patrick when we were down to 10 men but he felt he had to fight harder to win the ball."

The draw against PSV meant Arsenal had to beat against Rosenborg to qualify for the last 16. A 5–1 win at home, with five different goalscorers on the scoresheet, put Arsenal top of the group given PSV lost to Panathinaikos.

Pos	Team	Pld	W	D	L	GF	GA	GD	Pts	Qualification
1	(England) Arsenal	6	2	4	0	11	6	+5	10	Advance to knockout stage
2	(Netherlands) PSV Eindhoven	6	3	1	2	6	7	−1	10	Advance to knockout stage
3	(Greece) Panathinaikos	6	2	3	1	11	8	+3	9	Transfer to UEFA Cup
4	(Norway) Rosenborg	6	0	2	4	6	13	−7	2	

14 September 2004 1	Arsenal (England)	1–0	(Netherlands) PSV	London, England
19:45 BST	Alex 41' (o.g.)	Report		Stadium: Highbury; Attendance: 34,068; Referee: Domenico Messina (Italy)

29 September 2004 2	Rosenborg (Norway)	1–1	(England) Arsenal	Trondheim, Norway
20:45 CET	Strand 52'	Report	Ljungberg 6'	Stadium: Lerkendal Stadion; Attendance: 21,100; Referee: Florian Meyer (Germany)

20 October 2004 3	Panathinaikos (Greece)	2–2	(England) Arsenal	Athens, Greece
20:45 CET	González 65'; Olisadebe 82'	Report	Ljungberg 18'; Henry 74'	Stadium: Leoforos Alexandras Stadium; Attendance: 12,346; Referee: Valentin Ivanov (Russia)

2 November 2004 4	Arsenal (England)	1–1	(Greece) Panathinaikos	London, England
19:45 GMT	Henry 16' (pen.)	Report	Cygan 75' (o.g.)	Stadium: Highbury; Attendance: 35,137; Referee: Luis Medina Cantalejo (Spain)

24 November 2004 5	PSV (Netherlands)	1–1	(England) Arsenal	Eindhoven, Netherlands
20:45 CET	Ooijer 8'	Report	Henry 31'; Lauren (red card) 65'; Vieira (red card) 78'	Stadium: Philips Stadion; Attendance: 35,200; Referee: Herbert Fandel (Germany)

7 December 2004 6	Arsenal (England)	5–1	(Norway) Rosenborg	London, England
19:45 GMT	Reyes 3'; Henry 24'; Fàbregas 29'; Pires 41' (pen.); van Persie 84'	Report	Hoftun 38'	Stadium: Highbury; Attendance: 35,421; Referee: Stefano Farina (Italy)

=== Knockout phase ===
==== Round of 16 ====
Arsenal were drawn against Bayern Munich in the knockout stages. In the first leg a mistake from Touré presented Claudio Pizarro to score inside four minutes. The striker then scored his second of the match in the 58th minute, getting past his marker Touré, and Hasan Salihamidžić added a third for Bayern seven minutes later. Touré scored an away goal late on for Arsenal, which gave them a slender chance of progressing into the quarter-finals. Arsenal beat Bayern in the second leg, but a solitary goal – scored by Henry in the 66th minute, meant the club was eliminated.

22 February 2005 First leg	Bayern Munich (Germany)	3–1	(England) Arsenal	Munich, Germany
20:45 CET	Pizarro 4', 58'; Salihamidžić 65'	Report	Touré 88'	Stadium: Olympiastadion; Attendance: 36,891; Referee: Kim Milton Nielsen (Denmark)

9 March 2005 Second leg	Arsenal (England)	1–0 (2–3 agg.)	(Germany) Bayern Munich	London, England
19:45 GMT	Henry 66'	Report		Stadium: Highbury; Attendance: 35,450; Referee: Massimo De Santis (Italy)

== Player statistics ==
Arsenal used a total of 32 players during the 2004–05 season and there were 18 different goalscorers. There were also three squad members who did not make a first-team appearance in the campaign. The team played in a 4–4–2 formation throughout the season, but Wenger deployed a 4–5–1 formation for the cup final. Touré featured in 49 matches – the most of any Arsenal player in the campaign.

The team scored a total of 117 goals in all competitions. The highest scorer was Henry, with 30 goals, followed by Pires who scored 17 goals. Five Arsenal players were sent off during the season: Vieira, Reyes, Bergkamp, Van Persie and Lauren.

Key

No. = Squad number

Pos = Playing position

Nat. = Nationality

Apps = Appearances

GK = Goalkeeper

DF = Defender

MF = Midfielder

FW = Forward

= Yellow cards

= Red cards

Numbers in parentheses denote appearances as substitute. Players with number struck through and marked † left the club during the playing season.

No.	Pos.	Nat.	Name	Premier League		FA Cup		League Cup		Community Shield		Champions League		Total		Discipline	
No.	Pos.	Nat.	Name	Apps	Goals	Apps	Goals	Apps	Goals	Apps	Goals	Apps	Goals	Apps	Goals	A yellow rectangular card	A red rectangular card
1	GK	GER	Jens Lehmann	28	0	5	0	0	0	1	0	7	0	41	0	0	0
3	DF	ENG	Ashley Cole	35	2	3	0	1	0	1	0	7 (1)	0	46 (1)	2	10	0
4	MF	FRA	Patrick Vieira	32	6	6	1	0	0	0	0	6	0	44	7	12	1
7	MF	FRA	Robert Pires	26 (7)	14	4 (2)	2	0	0	0	0	7 (1)	1	37 (10)	17	3	0
8	MF	SWE	Freddie Ljungberg	24 (2)	10	5 (1)	2	0	0	0	0	6	2	35 (3)	14	3	0
9	FW	ESP	José Antonio Reyes	25 (5)	9	6	1	0	0	1	1	7 (1)	1	39 (6)	12	5	1
10	FW	NED	Dennis Bergkamp	20 (9)	8	4	0	0	0	1	0	4	0	29 (9)	8	2	1
11	FW	NED	Robin van Persie	12 (14)	5	5	2	3	1	(1)	0	(6)	1	18 (23)	10	3	1
12	DF	CMR	Lauren	32 (1)	1	4	0	0	0	1	0	7	0	44 (1)	1	8	1
14	FW	FRA	Thierry Henry	31 (1)	25	1	0	0	0	1	0	8	5	41 (1)	30	3	0
15	MF	ESP	Cesc Fàbregas	24 (9)	2	4 (2)	0	1	0	1	0	4 (1)	1	34 (12)	3	7	0
16	MF	FRA	Mathieu Flamini	9 (12)	1	4	0	3	0	0	0	2 (2)	0	18 (14)	1	3	0
17	MF	BRA	Edu	6 (6)	2	(1)	0	1	0	0	0	3 (1)	0	10 (8)	2	2	0
18	DF	FRA	Pascal Cygan	15	0	2 (1)	0	1	0	1	0	3	0	22 (1)	0	2	0
19	MF	BRA	Gilberto Silva	13	0	0	0	0	0	1	1	1	0	17	1	0	0
20	DF	SUI	Philippe Senderos	12 (1)	0	6	0	3	0	0	0	1	0	22 (1)	0	2	0
21	MF	ENG	Jermaine Pennant	1 (6)	0	1	0	3	0	1	0	0	0	6 (6)	0	0	0
22	DF	FRA	Gaël Clichy	7 (8)	0	5	0	1	0	(1)	0	1 (1)	0	14 (10)	0	3	0
23	DF	ENG	Sol Campbell	16	1	1	0	0	0	0	0	4	0	21	1	2	0
24	GK	ESP	Manuel Almunia	10	0	2	0	3	0	0	0	1	0	16	0	0	0
27	DF	CIV	Emmanuel Eboué	(1)	0	3	0	0	0	0	0	0	0	3 (1)	0	0	0
28	DF	CIV	Kolo Touré	35	0	5 (1)	0	0	0	1	0	8	1	49 (1)	1	3	0
30	FW	FRA	Jérémie Aliadière	(4)	0	(2)	0	0	0	(1)	0	(1)	0	(7)	0	0	0
31	DF	ENG	Justin Hoyte	4 (1)	0	(1)	0	3	0	(1)	0	1 (1)	0	8 (4)	0	0	0
32	DF	DEN	Sebastian Svärd	0	0	0	0	0	0	(1)	0	0	0	(1)	0	0	0
34	MF	IRL	Patrick Cregg	0	0	0	0	(2)	0	0	0	0	0	(2)	0	0	0
35	DF	SUI	Johan Djourou	0	0	0	0	2 (1)	0	0	0	0	0	2 (1)	0	0	0
39	MF	SWE	Sebastian Larsson	0	0	0	0	2 (1)	0	0	0	0	0	2 (1)	0	0	0
40	FW	ITA	Arturo Lupoli	0	0	1	0	3	2	0	0	0	0	4	2	0	0
42	FW	NED	Quincy Owusu-Abeyie	1	0	(2)	0	1 (2)	1	0	0	(1)	0	2 (5)	1	0	0
46	DF	USA	Danny Karbassiyoon	0	0	0	0	1 (2)	1	0	0	0	0	1 (2)	1	0	0
47	FW	ENG	Ryan Smith	0	0	0	0	2 (1)	0	0	0	0	0	2 (1)	0	0	0

== See also ==
- 2004-05 in English football
