= 2005–06 Arsenal F.C. season =

English football club season

Arsenal
2005–06 season
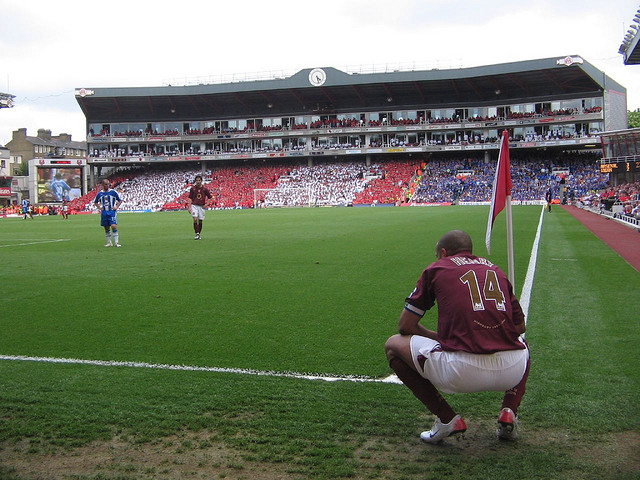
- Thierry Henry preparing to take a corner kick for Arsenal's final ever game at Highbury against Wigan.
- Chairman: Peter Hill-Wood
- Manager: Arsène Wenger
- Stadium: Highbury
- Premier League: 4th
- FA Cup: Fourth round
- League Cup: Semi-finals
- FA Community Shield: Runners-up
- UEFA Champions League: Runners-up
- Top goalscorer: League: Thierry Henry (27); All: Thierry Henry (33)
- Highest home attendance: 38,359 vs Wigan Athletic (7 May 2006)
- Lowest home attendance: 34,498 vs Thun (14 September 2005)
- Average home league attendance: 37,295
Home colours	Away colours	Third colours

The 2005–06 season was Arsenal Football Club's 14th season in the Premier League and their 80th consecutive season in the top flight of English football. It was the final season in which home matches were played at the club's Highbury stadium after 93 years; Arsenal intended to move to its new 60,000 capacity Emirates Stadium in time for the following season. The club ended their Premier League campaign in fourth, having pipped local rivals Tottenham Hotspur to the position on the final day. Arsenal became the first London club to reach a UEFA Champions League final, though lost 2–1 to Barcelona in Paris. In the League Cup, the club was eliminated in the semi-finals on aggregate score by Wigan Athletic and knocked out of the FA Cup, against Bolton Wanderers in the fourth round.

Before the season commenced midfielder Patrick Vieira was sold to Juventus; striker Thierry Henry assumed his club captaincy role. Alexander Hleb was purchased from Stuttgart for an undisclosed fee in July 2005; in the winter transfer window Arsenal signed midfielder Abou Diaby, and forwards Emmanuel Adebayor and Theo Walcott.

Arsenal lost to league champions Chelsea in the 2005 FA Community Shield at the Millennium Stadium. An indifferent start in the league saw Arsenal peak in second position after 13 matches, but a run of three consecutive defeats a month later had effectively ruled them out of title contention. On the final day, they beat Wigan Athletic 4–2 at Highbury; Tottenham Hotspur's defeat at West Ham United meant Arsenal secured fourth place. The team's performances in Europe were more striking; they eliminated Real Madrid, Juventus and Villarreal in the knockout stages. In the 2006 UEFA Champions League Final held at the Stade de France in Paris on 17 May 2006, goalkeeper Jens Lehmann was sent off for a professional foul on Barcelona's Samuel Eto'o. Although defender Sol Campbell gave Arsenal a first half lead from a set piece, the team conceded twice in the final 15 minutes to lose the match.

To mark the final season at Highbury, Arsenal held a valedictory campaign titled "Highbury – The Final Salute". The club staged several themed matchdays and a redcurrant home kit replaced the common red to honour the shirts worn in 1913.

== Background ==
Arsenal began the preceding season as league champions; a win against Blackburn Rovers in August 2004 ensured they eclipsed Nottingham Forest's record of 42 league matches unbeaten. The run extended to six more matches, before losing 2–0 to Manchester United at Old Trafford on 24 October 2004. Poor form throughout November allowed league leaders Chelsea to extend the gap at the top; Wenger conceded retaining the title in April 2005, calling his opponents "worthy champions ... they have been remarkably consistent." A run of twelve league matches unbeaten, culminating in a 7–0 home win against Everton helped Arsenal finish in second place. In spite of exiting the Champions League to Bayern Munich in the second round, the team won the 2005 FA Cup Final against Manchester United – winning 5–4 on penalties after a goalless draw.

=== Highbury – The Final Salute ===
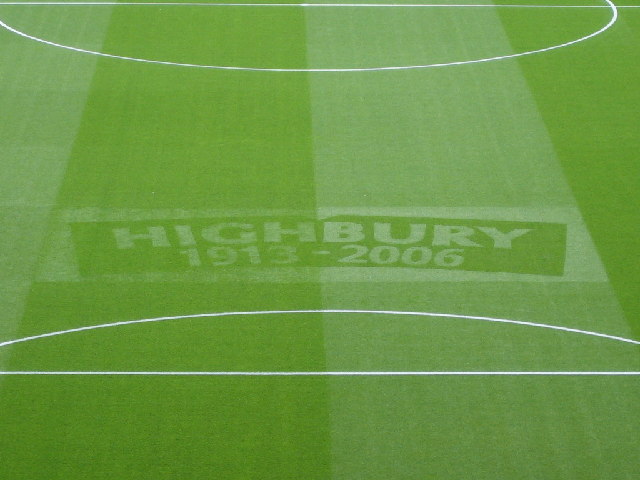
Arsenal prepared for their final season at Highbury

The 2005–06 season marked Arsenal's final season at Highbury, their home since 1913. The club planned to move half a mile to the Emirates Stadium, considered "vital to our future" by Wenger, as it financially would help them to compete at the top level. To mark the valedictory campaign titled "Highbury – The Final Salute", the club staged many special activities on matchdays "...to celebrate the many great players and moments that this fantastic stadium has witnessed." A redcurrant home kit was designed to honour the shirts worn in the club's first season at Highbury. It was adorned with gold lettering and accompanied by white shorts and redcurrant socks.

List of themed matchdays at Highbury
Matchday	Date
Players Day	14 August 2005
Goal Celebrations Day	24 August 2005
European Night	14 September 2005
European Night	2 November 2005
Doubles Day	19 September 2005
Internationals Day	2 October 2005
Wenger Day	22 October 2005
Memorial Day	5 November 2005
49-ers Day	26 November 2005
League Cup Night	29 November 2005
League Cup Night	24 January 2006
Boxers v Jockeys Day	7 December 2005
Great Saves Day	18 December 2005
Hat-trick Heroes Day	28 December 2005
Back Four Day	3 January 2006
FA Cup Day	7 January 2006
1913 Day	14 January 2006
London Derbies Day	1 February 2006
Home Grown Players Day	11 February 2006
Managers Day	8 March 2006
Captains Day	12 March 2006
Junior Gunners Day	18 March 2006
Decades Day	28 March 2006
David Rocastle Day	1 April 2006
Dennis Bergkamp Day	15 April 2006
Records Day	19 April 2006
Kits Day	22 April 2006
Goals Day	7 May 2006

=== Transfers ===
Arsenal signed youth players Nicklas Bendtner, Vito Mannone and Armand Traoré in the summer transfer window. Belarusian Alexander Hleb joined the club for an undisclosed fee on 12 July 2005. Arsenal made four more additions during the season: goalkeeper Mart Poom, signed on a permanent deal, midfielder Abou Diaby, who reportedly turned down an offer to join Chelsea and forwards Emmanuel Adebayor and Theo Walcott.

After the early departures of Jermaine Pennant and Stuart Taylor, club captain Patrick Vieira joined Italian side Juventus in a £13.7 million deal. Wenger did not intend to sign a replacement, saying: "I am not in a hurry. We have Gilberto, Flamini, and Fàbregas. Pires can play in there also so we have plenty of players." English midfielder David Bentley made his loan deal at Blackburn Rovers permanent in the January transfer window.

In

No.	Position	Player	Transferred from	Fee	Date	Ref
33	FW	Nicklas Bendtner	Copenhagen	£75,000	1 July 2005	
	GK	Vito Mannone	Atalanta	£350,000	4 July 2005	
	DF	Armand Traoré	Monaco	Undisclosed	4 July 2005	
13	MF	Alexander Hleb	Stuttgart	Undisclosed	12 July 2005	
2	MF	Abou Diaby	Auxerre	£2m	13 January 2006	
25	FW	Emmanuel Adebayor	Monaco	Undisclosed	13 January 2006	
32	FW	Theo Walcott	Southampton	£5m	20 January 2006	
	GK	Mart Poom	Sunderland	Undisclosed	23 January 2006	

Out

No.	Position	Player	Transferred to	Fee	Date	Ref
	MF	Jermaine Pennant	Birmingham City	£3.0m	25 April 2005	
	GK	Chris Wright	Boston United	Undisclosed	29 May 2005	
13	GK	Stuart Taylor	Aston Villa	Undisclosed	27 June 2005	
4	MF	Patrick Vieira	Juventus	£13.7m	14 July 2005	
	DF	Frank Simek	Sheffield Wednesday	Free	27 July 2005	
31	GK	Graham Stack	Reading	Undisclosed	30 December 2005	
35	MF	Patrick Cregg	Falkirk	Undisclosed	6 January 2006	
25	MF	David Bentley	Blackburn Rovers	Undisclosed	31 January 2006	
26	FW	Quincy Owusu-Abeyie	Spartak Moscow	Undisclosed	31 January 2006	

Loans in

No.	Position	Player	Loaned from	Loan commenced	Loan expired	Ref
	DF	Alex Song	Bastia	11 August 2005	End of season, view to sign permanently	
	GK	Mart Poom	Sunderland	31 August 2005	End of season	

Loans out

No.	Position	Player	Loaned to	Loan commenced	Loan expired	Ref
31	GK	Graham Stack	Reading	7 July 2005	January 2006	
30	FW	Jérémie Aliadière	West Ham United	25 August 2005	January 2006	
30	FW	Jérémie Aliadière	Wolverhampton Wanderers	31 January 2006	End of season	
25	MF	David Bentley	Blackburn Rovers	31 August 2005	End of season	
31	DF	Justin Hoyte	Sunderland	31 August 2005	End of season	
39	GK	Mark Howard	Falkirk	29 January 2006	End of season	

== Pre-season ==
16 July 2005 Friendly	Barnet	1–4	Arsenal	Barnet
	Sinclair 74'	Report	Hleb 2', Henry (pen.), Bergkamp (?), Hoyte (?)	Stadium: Underhill Stadium

20 July 2005 Friendly	SC Weiz	0–5	Arsenal	Weiz
19:00 CET		Report	Flamini 1', Henry 4', 37', Bentley 15', Bergkamp 50'	Stadium: Sparkassen-Stadion

24 July 2005 Friendly	Ritzing	2–5	Arsenal	Ritzing
16:00 CET	Pajer 38', Schiffer 75'	Report	Bergkamp 10', Henry 17', Reyes 35' (pen.), Hleb 79', Larsson 90'	Stadium: Sparkassen-Stadion

26 July 2005 Friendly	Utrecht	0–3	Arsenal	Bad Waltersdorf
		Report	Pires 13' (pen.), Reyes 54', Henry 77'

29 July 2005 Amsterdam Tournament	Ajax	0–1	Arsenal	Amsterdam
		Report	Lupoli 87'	Stadium: Amsterdam Arena; Attendance: 35,000; Referee: Dick van Egmond (Netherlands)

31 July 2005 Amsterdam Tournament	Porto	1–2	Arsenal	Amsterdam
	Lisandro 37'	Report	Ljungberg 49', 58'	Stadium: Amsterdam Arena; Attendance: 35,000; Referee: Ruud Bossen (Netherlands)

== FA Community Shield ==
As winners of the FA Cup in the previous season, Arsenal contested the 2005 FA Community Shield against league champions Chelsea. Two goals scored by striker Didier Drogba meant Arsenal lost the match. Wenger commented afterwards that Chelsea's gameplan made it difficult for the Arsenal defenders, and noted his opposition's strength was playing long balls. When asked if he was concerned by the performance, Wenger replied: "Why should I worry? Did you see the game? You can worry for the Chelsea supporters."

7 August 2005	Arsenal	1–2	Chelsea	Cardiff, Wales
15:00 BST	Fàbregas 64'	Report	Drogba 8', 58'	Stadium: Millennium Stadium; Attendance: 58,014; Referee: Howard Webb

== Premier League ==
=== August–October ===
"If you look at the history of the championship, this is very early to have lost two games. If we lose more than four, it's going to be a struggle."

— Ashley Cole, 10 September 2005

Arsenal began their final league season at Highbury against Newcastle United on 14 August 2005. In spite of having a man advantage after midfielder Jermaine Jenas was sent off for a challenge on Gilberto Silva, striker Thierry Henry scored from the penalty spot in the 81st minute. Robin van Persie added a second, four minutes from the end of the match. A fortunate goal from Drogba inflicted Arsenal's first defeat against Chelsea in the league for almost a decade. The team responded with a 4–1 victory against Fulham, whereby Henry and defender Pascal Cygan both scored twice. Arsenal lost away to Middlesbrough on 10 September 2005, in a performance derided by Wenger as being "unacceptable". A brace (two goals) from Sol Campbell against Everton was followed by a goalless draw against newly promoted West Ham United.

An own goal scored by Stephen Clemence gave Arsenal a 1–0 victory in the first week of October at home to Birmingham City. Despite being "technically the better side" away to West Bromwich Albion, Arsenal lost 2–1; Wenger after the match commented that the team "played with great spirit but ... were punished for a lack of experience and maturity because we didn't take advantage of the chances we created." A penalty scored by Robert Pires was enough to secure three points against Manchester City. The midfielder wasted a second penalty in the second half, choosing to recreate a spot kick executed by Johan Cruyff and Jesper Olsen for Ajax. Having attempted to roll the ball towards onrushing Henry, Pires inadvertently flicked the ball twice, enabling referee Mike Riley to award a free-kick to Manchester City. Although both players were scrutinised by Chelsea manager José Mourinho, they were commended by Cryuff for showing a desire to try something different. The final league match of October ended in a 1–1 draw against local rivals Tottenham Hotpsur.

=== November–February ===
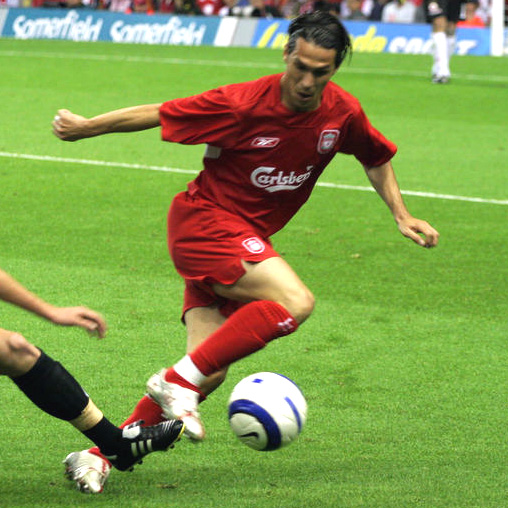
Luis García scored the winning goal for Liverpool against Arsenal

A 3–1 win at home to Sunderland on 5 November 2005 meant Arsenal moved third in the league table. This was followed by a trip to the JJB Stadium; Arsenal beat Wigan Athletic 3–2 in a "hugely entertaining game on a cold, frosty afternoon". Henry scored his 100th goal at Highbury against Blackburn Rovers to extend a club unbeaten run of nine matches. Defeat at Bolton Wanderers in early December concerned Wenger, admitting the opponents showed the template required to beat his team. A further defeat against Newcastle United, where Gilberto Silva was sent off in the second half highlighted the "physical absence" of Vieira in midfield. In losing 2–0 to Chelsea a week after – their third successive defeat for the first time under Wenger, Arsenal lay in eighth position, 11 points behind Manchester United. An early morning kick-off away to Charlton Athletic ended in a 1–0 victory for Arsenal; José Antonio Reyes scored his second goal in the league. Four first-half goals against Portsmouth helped Arsenal to close the gap on second place by nine points. They ended the calendar year and began 2006 with goalless draws against Aston Villa and Manchester United respectively.

Arsenal recorded the biggest win of the league season, against Middlesbrough at Highbury. Henry scored a hat-trick in a 7–0 victory; the striker post-match deemed it was vital for the club to finish in the top four "...for me, for the club and for the fans." They suffered two consecutive defeats: away to Everton and at home to West Ham United. In the latter match, Campbell was substituted at his request before the second half, having been at fault for Nigel Reo-Coker and Bobby Zamora's goals. He "went missing" after the match, subsequently returning to training five days later. Emmanuel Adebayor scored his first goal for Arsenal in a 2–0 win against Birmingham City on 4 February 2006. A stoppage time goal scored by Gilberto earned the team a point against Bolton Wanderers at Highbury; they went 1–0 down in the 12th minute after Kevin Nolan chipped the ball past goalkeeper Jens Lehmann. Arsenal conceded a late goal away to Liverpool on Valentine's Day – a result which left the club 10 points behind their opponents. Defeat against Blackburn Rovers meant they lost for the second consecutive game. Having collected just three wins out of a possible 14 away from home, Wenger admitted the form of the team remained "a big worry" given they needed to play five more.

=== March–May ===
In the first week of March, Arsenal beat Fulham 4–0 with a "commanding performance" from Henry, who scored two goals. The striker scored the winning goal against Liverpool in their next match, from a Steven Gerrard backpass. A polished performance against Charlton Athletic was followed by a five-goal win at home to Aston Villa on 1 April 2006. Arsenal lost 2–0 to Manchester United and dropped two points against relegation-threatened Portsmouth, meaning a fourth-place finish was in Tottenham Hotspur's favour.

Dennis Bergkamp scored his final goal for Arsenal against West Bromwich Albion in a 3–1 win; he came on as a substitute in the second half to set up Pires to score the winning goal, moments after Nigel Quashie had leveled the scoreline; fittingly the day was dedicated to him. Arsenal drew 1–1 at home to Tottenham Hotspur, with Wenger choosing to rest players in mind for the club's Champions League semi-final. A 3–0 win away at Sunderland was overshadowed by a tackle on Abou Diaby, ruling him out for the remainder of the season. Two late goals scored by Reyes against Manchester City moved Arsenal a point behind Tottenham Hotspur in fourth. In the final competitive match played at Highbury, Arsenal faced Wigan Athletic, needing to better their rivals result to guarantee Champions League qualification. Henry scored a hat-trick in a six-goal match, helping Arsenal end the season with 67 points from 38 matches. Tottenham Hotspur's defeat against West Ham United meant Arsenal finished fourth, a position Gilberto felt the club "deserved".

=== Match results ===
14 August 2005 1	Arsenal	2–0	Newcastle United	London
13:30 BST	Henry 81' (pen.) van Persie 87'	Report	Jenas (red card) 32'	Stadium: Highbury; Attendance: 38,072; Referee: Steve Bennett

21 August 2005 2	Chelsea	1–0	Arsenal	London
16:00 BST	Drogba 73'	Report		Stadium: Stamford Bridge; Attendance: 42,136; Referee: Graham Poll

24 August 2005 3	Arsenal	4–1	Fulham	London
19:45 BST	Cygan 32', 90+1'; Henry 53', 82'	Report	Jensen 22'	Stadium: Highbury; Attendance: 37,867; Referee: Mark Clattenburg

10 September 2005 4	Middlesbrough	2–1	Arsenal	Middlesbrough
17:15 BST	Yakubu 40'; Maccarone 59'	Report	Reyes 90+3'	Stadium: Riverside Stadium; Attendance: 28,075; Referee: Mike Riley

19 September 2005 5	Arsenal	2–0	Everton	London
20:00 BST	Campbell 11', 30'	Report		Stadium: Highbury; Attendance: 38,121; Referee: Alan Wiley

24 September 2005 6	West Ham United	0–0	Arsenal	London
15:00 BST		Report		Stadium: Upton Park; Attendance: 34,742; Referee: Mike Dean

2 October 2005 7	Arsenal	1–0	Birmingham City	London
13:30 BST	Clemence 81' (o.g.)	Report	Cunningham (red card) 24'	Stadium: Highbury; Attendance: 37,891; Referee: Chris Foy

15 October 2005 8	West Bromwich Albion	2–1	Arsenal	West Bromwich
15:00 BST	Kanu 37'; Carter 76'	Report	Senderos 17'	Stadium: The Hawthorns; Attendance: 26,604; Referee: Barry Knight

22 October 2005 9	Arsenal	1–0	Manchester City	London
15:00 BST	Pires 61' (pen.)	Report		Stadium: Highbury; Attendance: 38,189; Referee: Mike Riley

29 October 2005 10	Tottenham Hotspur	1–1	Arsenal	London
13:00 BST	King 17'	Report	Pires 77'	Stadium: White Hart Lane; Attendance: 36,154; Referee: Steve Bennett

5 November 2005 11	Arsenal	3–1	Sunderland	London
15:00 GMT	van Persie 12'; Henry 36', 82'	Report	Stubbs 75'	Stadium: Highbury; Attendance: 38,210; Referee: Alan Wiley

19 November 2005 12	Wigan Athletic	2–3	Arsenal	Wigan
12:45 GMT	Camara 28'; Bullard 45'	Report	van Persie 11'; Henry 21', 41'	Stadium: JJB Stadium; Attendance: 25,004; Referee: Graham Poll

26 November 2005 13	Arsenal	3–0	Blackburn Rovers	London
15:00 GMT	Fàbregas 4'; Henry 45' van Persie 90'	Report		Stadium: Higbury; Attendance: 38,192; Referee: Chris Foy

3 December 2005 14	Bolton Wanderers	2–0	Arsenal	Bolton
15:00 GMT	Faye 20'; Giannakopoulos 32'	Report		Stadium: Reebok Stadium; Attendance: 26,792; Referee: Howard Webb

10 December 2005 15	Newcastle United	1–0	Arsenal	Newcastle-upon-Tyne
17:15 GMT	Solano 82'	Report	Gilberto (red card)	Stadium: St James' Park; Attendance: 52,297; Referee: Dermot Gallagher

18 December 2005 16	Arsenal	0–2	Chelsea	London
16:00 GMT		Report	Robben 39'; J. Cole 73'	Stadium: Highbury; Attendance: 38,347; Referee: Rob Styles

26 December 2005 17	Charlton Athletic	0–1	Arsenal	London
12:45 GMT	Murphy (red card)	Report	Reyes 58'	Stadium: The Valley; Attendance: 27,111; Referee: Steve Bennett

28 December 2005 18	Arsenal	4–0	Portsmouth	London
19:45 GMT	Bergkamp 7'; Reyes 13'; Henry 37', 43' (pen.)	Report		Stadium: Highbury; Attendance: 38,223; Referee: Mark Clattenburg

31 December 2005 19	Aston Villa	0–0	Arsenal	Birmingham
12:45 GMT		Report		Stadium: Villa Park; Attendance: 37,114; Referee: Uriah Rennie

3 January 2006 20	Arsenal	0–0	Manchester United	London
20:00 GMT		Report		Stadium: Highbury; Attendance: 38,313; Referee: Graham Poll

14 January 2006 21	Arsenal	7–0	Middlesbrough	London
15:00 GMT	Henry 20', 30', 68'; Senderos 22'; Pires 45+2'; Silva 59'; Hleb 84'	Report	Doriva (red card) 72'	Stadium: Highbury; Attendance: 38,186; Referee: Rob Styles

21 January 2006 22	Everton	1–0	Arsenal	Liverpool
12:45 GMT	Beattie 13'	Report		Stadium: Goodison Park; Attendance: 36,920; Referee: Alan Wiley

1 February 2006 23	Arsenal	2–3	West Ham United	London
20:00 GMT	Henry 45'; Pires 89'	Report	Reo-Coker 25'; Zamora 32'; Etherington 80'	Stadium: Highbury; Attendance: 38,216; Referee: Mark Halsey

4 February 2006 24	Birmingham City	0–2	Arsenal	Birmingham
15:00 GMT		Report	Adebayor 21'; Henry 63'	Stadium: St Andrew's; Attendance: 27,075; Referee: Mike Riley

11 February 2006 25	Arsenal	1–1	Bolton Wanderers	London
15:00 GMT	Silva 90+3'	Report	Nolan 12'	Stadium: Highbury; Attendance: 38,193; Referee: Howard Webb

14 February 2006 26	Liverpool	1–0	Arsenal	Liverpool
20:00 GMT	Luis García 87'	Report		Stadium: Anfield; Attendance: 44,012; Referee: Graham Poll

25 February 2006 27	Blackburn Rovers	1–0	Arsenal	Blackburn
15:00 GMT	Pedersen 18'	Report		Stadium: Ewood Park; Attendance: 22,504; Referee: Uriah Rennie

4 March 2006 28	Fulham	0–4	Arsenal	London
15:00 GMT		Report	Henry 31', 77'; Adebayor 35'; Fàbregas 86'	Stadium: Craven Cottage; Attendance: 22,397; Referee: Rob Styles

12 March 2006 29	Arsenal	2–1	Liverpool	London
16:00 GMT	Henry 21', 83'	Report	Luis García 76'	Stadium: Highbury; Attendance: 38,221; Referee: Steve Bennett

18 March 2006 30	Arsenal	3–0	Charlton Athletic	London
15:00 GMT	Pires 12'; Adebayor 32'; Hleb 49'	Report		Stadium: Highbury; Attendance: 38,223; Referee: Dermot Gallagher

1 April 2006 31	Arsenal	5–0	Aston Villa	London
15:00 BST	Adebayor 19'; Henry 25', 46' van Persie 71'; Diaby 80'	Report		Stadium: Highbury; Attendance: 38,183; Referee: Mark Atkinson

9 April 2006 32	Manchester United	2–0	Arsenal	Manchester
16:00 BST	Rooney 54'; Park 78'	Report		Stadium: Old Trafford; Attendance: 70,908; Referee: Graham Poll

12 April 2006 33	Portsmouth	1–1	Arsenal	Portsmouth
20:00 BST	LuaLua 66'	Report	Henry 36'	Stadium: Fratton Park; Attendance: 20,230; Referee: Uriah Rennie

15 April 2006 34	Arsenal	3–1	West Bromwich Albion	London
15:00 BST	Hleb 44'; Pires 76'; Bergkamp 89'	Report	Quashie 72'	Stadium: Highbury; Attendance: 38,167; Referee: Mike Dean

22 April 2006 35	Arsenal	1–1	Tottenham Hotspur	London
12:45 BST	Henry 84'	Report	Keane 66'	Stadium: Highbury; Attendance: 38,326; Referee: Steve Bennett

1 May 2006 36	Sunderland	0–3	Arsenal	Sunderland
17:15 BST		Report	Collins 29' (o.g.); Fàbregas 40'; Henry 43'	Stadium: Stadium of Light; Attendance: 44,003; Referee: Dermot Gallagher

4 May 2006 37	Manchester City	1–3	Arsenal	Manchester
19:45 BST	Sommeil 38'	Report	Ljungberg 30'; Reyes 78', 84'	Stadium: City of Manchester Stadium; Attendance: 41,875; Referee: Graham Poll

7 May 2006 38	Arsenal	4–2	Wigan Athletic	London
15:00 BST	Pires 8'; Henry 35', 56', 76' (pen.)	Report	Scharner 10'; Thompson 33'	Stadium: Highbury; Attendance: 38,359; Referee: Uriah Rennie

=== Classification ===
Pos	Team	Pld	W	D	L	GF	GA	GD	Pts	Qualification or relegation
2	Manchester United	38	25	8	5	72	34	+38	83	Qualification for the Champions League group stage
3	Liverpool	38	25	7	6	57	25	+32	82	Qualification for the Champions League third qualifying round
4	Arsenal	38	20	7	11	68	31	+37	67	Qualification for the Champions League third qualifying round
5	Tottenham Hotspur	38	18	11	9	53	38	+15	65	Qualification for the UEFA Cup first round (Note: Since Manchester United qualified for the Champions League, their place in the UEFA Cup as League Cup winners passed down to the league and was awarded to Blackburn Rovers as the highest-placed team not already qualified for European competitions.)
6	Blackburn Rovers	38	19	6	13	51	42	+9	63	Qualification for the UEFA Cup first round

Source: Barclays Premier League
Rules for classification: 1) points; 2) goal difference; 3) number of goals scored.

==== Results summary ====
Overall								Home						Away					
Pld	W	D	L	GF	GA	GD	Pts	W	D	L	GF	GA	GD	W	D	L	GF	GA	GD
38	20	7	11	68	31	+37	67	14	3	2	48	13	+35	6	4	9	20	18	+2

==== Results by round ====
Round	1	2	3	4	5	6	7	8	9	10	11	12	13	14	15	16	17	18	19	20	21	22	23	24	25	26	27	28	29	30	31	32	33	34	35	36	37	38
Ground	H	A	H	A	H	A	H	A	H	A	H	A	H	A	A	H	A	H	A	H	H	A	H	A	H	A	A	A	H	H	H	A	A	H	H	A	A	H
Result	W	L	W	L	W	D	W	L	W	D	W	W	W	L	L	L	W	W	D	D	W	L	L	W	D	L	L	W	W	W	W	L	D	W	D	W	W	W
Position	3	9	4	8	7	7	7	8	7	7	3	4	2	5	6	8	7	6	6	5	5	5	6	5	5	5	6	5	5	5	5	6	5	5	5	5	5	4

A = Away; H = Home; W = Win; D = Draw; L = Loss

== FA Cup ==
Arsenal entered the competition in the third round, receiving a bye as a Premier League club. Their opening match was a 2–1 home win against Cardiff City on 7 January 2006, with both goals scored by Pires. Arsenal faced Bolton Wanderers the following round; an understrength team lost 1–0 after Giannakopulos headed in the winning goal, six minutes from the end of the match.

7 January 2006 Third round	Arsenal	2–1	Cardiff City	London
	Pires 6', 18'	Report	Jerome 87'	Stadium: Highbury; Attendance: 36,552; Referee: Martin Atkinson

28 January 2006 Fourth round	Bolton Wanderers	1–0	Arsenal	Bolton
	Giannakopulos 84'	Report		Stadium: Reebok Stadium; Attendance: 13,326; Referee: Mike Dean

== Football League Cup ==
Arsenal entered the Football League Cup in the third round, where they were drawn away to Sunderland. A 3–0 victory meant they progressed to the fourth round, where they beat First Division club Reading by an identical scoreline. Extra time and penalties was required in Arsenal's fifth round tie against Doncaster Rovers, after a 2–2 draw in 90 minutes. Two saves by goalkeeper Manuel Almunia helped Arsenal win 3–1 on penalties and reach the semi-finals of the competition for the first time since 1998. They faced Wigan Athletic, losing 1–0 in the first leg and in spite of winning the second leg 2–1 with a full strength team, Arsenal was eliminated on the away goals rule.

25 October 2005 Third round	Sunderland	0–3	Arsenal	Sunderland
		Report	Eboué 61' van Persie 67', 87' (pen.)	Stadium: Stadium of Light; Attendance: 47,366; Referee: Matt Messias

29 November 2005 Fourth round	Arsenal	3–0	Reading	London
	Reyes 12' van Persie 42'; Lupoli 65'	Report		Stadium: Highbury; Attendance: 36,167; Referee: Lee Mason

21 December 2005 Quarter-finals	Doncaster Rovers	2–2 (a.e.t.) (1–3 p)	Arsenal	Doncaster
	McIndoe 2'; Green 104'	Report	Owusu-Abeyie 63'; Gilberto 120'	Stadium: Belle Vue; Attendance: 10,006; Referee: Phil Dowd

10 January 2006 Semi-final, first leg	Wigan Athletic	1–0	Arsenal	Wigan
	Scharner 78'	Report		Stadium: JJB Stadium; Attendance: 12,181; Referee: Howard Webb

24 January 2006 Semi-final, second leg	Arsenal	2–1 (a.e.t.) (2–2a agg.)	Wigan Athletic	London
19:45 GMT	Henry 65' van Persie 108'	Report	Roberts 119'	Stadium: Highbury; Attendance: 37,086; Referee: Phil Dowd

== UEFA Champions League ==
=== Group stage ===
Arsenal qualified for the group stages of the Champions League in the 2005–06 season on virtue of finishing runners-up in the Premier League the preceding season. They were drawn in Group B, along with Swiss' Thun, Czech club Sparta Prague and Ajax of the Netherlands. In spite of Van Persie's dismissal against Thun in the opening group match, Arsenal won 2–1, courtesy of a late goal by substitute Bergkamp. A 2–1 win against Ajax was followed by a 2–0 victory against Sparta Prague; Henry scored both goals to surpass Ian Wright's all-time leading scorer record. A goal from Henry and two from Van Persie in the reverse fixture meant the club reached the knockout stages. A win at Thun on 22 November 2005 ensured Arsenal topped the group; they ended the group stages with a draw at Highbury against Ajax.

Pos	Team	Pld	W	D	L	GF	GA	GD	Pts	Qualification
1	(England) Arsenal	6	5	1	0	10	2	+8	16	Advance to knockout stage
2	(Netherlands) Ajax	6	3	2	1	10	6	+4	11	Advance to knockout stage
3	(Switzerland) Thun	6	1	1	4	4	9	−5	4	Transfer to UEFA Cup
4	(Czech Republic) Sparta Prague	6	0	2	4	2	9	−7	2	

Source: RSSSF

14 September 2005 1	Arsenal	2–1	Thun	London, England
19:45 BST	van Persie (red card) 45'; Silva 51'; Bergkamp 90+2'	Report	Ferreira 53'	Stadium: Highbury; Attendance: 34,498; Referee: Grzegorz Gilewski (Poland)

27 September 2005 2	Ajax	1–2	Arsenal	Amsterdam, Netherlands
20:45 CET	Rosenberg 71'	Report	Ljungberg 2'; Pires 69' (pen.)	Stadium: Amsterdam Arena; Attendance: 47,820; Referee: Luis Medina Cantalejo (Spain)

18 October 2005 3	Sparta Prague	0–2	Arsenal	Prague, Czech Republic
20:45 CET		Report	Henry 21', 74'	Stadium: Stadion Letná; Attendance: 12,528; Referee: Wolfgang Stark (Germany)

2 November 2005 4	Arsenal	3–0	Sparta Prague	London, England
19:45 GMT	Henry 23' van Persie 81', 86'	Report		Stadium: Highbury; Attendance: 35,155; Referee: Alain Sars (France)

22 November 2005 5	Thun	0–1	Arsenal	Bern, Switzerland
20:45 CET	Deumi (red card) 35'	Report	Pires 88' (pen.)	Stadium: Stade de Suisse; Attendance: 31,330; Referee: Lucílio Batista (Portugal)

7 December 2005 6	Arsenal	0–0	Ajax	London, England
19:45 GMT		Report		Stadium: Highbury; Attendance: 35,376; Referee: Eduardo Iturralde González (Spain)

=== Knockout phase ===
==== First knockout round ====
The club faced Real Madrid in the last 16 – the first encounter between both clubs in the competition. A solo goal by Henry at the Santiago Bernabéu in the first leg inflicted the home team's first defeat in 18 Champions League matches. A disciplined display at home a fortnight after helped Arsenal to reach the quarter-finals and become the sole English representative left in the competition.

21 February 2006 First leg	Real Madrid	0–1	Arsenal	Madrid, Spain
20:45 CET		Report	Henry 47'	Stadium: Santiago Bernabéu; Attendance: 80,000; Referee: Stefano Farina (Italy)

8 March 2006 Second leg	Arsenal	0–0 (1–0 agg.)	Real Madrid	London, England
19:45 GMT		Report		Stadium: Highbury; Attendance: 35,487; Referee: Ľuboš Micheľ (Slovakia)

==== Quarter-finals ====
At home to Juventus, Arsenal won 2–0 with goals from Fàbregas and Henry; the match was overshadowed by the return of former captain Vieira. A goalless draw at the Stadio delle Alpi meant the club progressed into the semi-finals against Villarreal.

28 March 2006 First leg	Arsenal	2–0	Juventus	London, England
19:45 GMT	Fàbregas 40'; Henry 69'	Report	Camoranesi (red card) 87'; Zebina (red card) 89'	Stadium: Highbury; Attendance: 35,472; Referee: Peter Fröjdfeldt (Sweden)

5 April 2006 Second leg	Juventus	0–0 (0–2 agg.)	Arsenal	Turin, Italy
20:45 CEST		Report		Stadium: Stadio delle Alpi; Attendance: 50,000; Referee: Herbert Fandel (Germany)

==== Semi-finals ====
In the club's final European match at Highbury, Touré scored a first-half goal to give Arsenal a 1–0 win over Villarreal. A late penalty save by goalkeeper Lehmann in the second leg helped Arsenal become the first London club to reach a Champions League final. The result, another goalless draw was Arsenal's tenth clean sheet in a row – a new competition record. Campbell, returning from injury praised the team performance in his post-match interview: "It's brilliant for us. It's also great for the manager Arsène Wenger to get to the final in France – I'm sure he will get a great reception."

19 April 2006 First leg	Arsenal	1–0	Villarreal	London, England
19:45 BST	Touré 41'	Report		Stadium: Highbury; Attendance: 35,438; Referee: Konrad Plautz (Austria)

25 April 2006 Second leg	Villarreal	0–0 (0–1 agg.)	Arsenal	Villarreal, Spain
20:45 CEST		Report		Stadium: Estadio El Madrigal; Attendance: 22,000; Referee: Ivan Ivanov (Russia)

==== Final ====
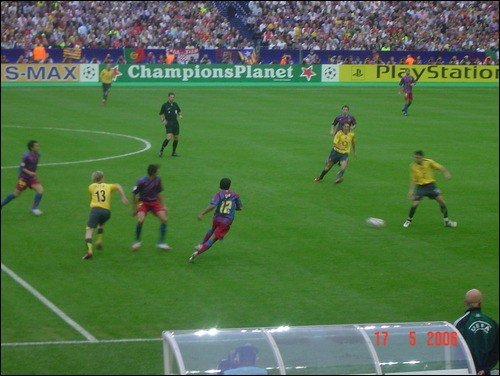
Play during the first half

In the final against Barcelona at the Stade de France in Saint-Denis, Paris, Arsenal fielded a 4–5–1 formation, with Eboué replacing the injured Lauren, and Cole making a return at left-back for Flamini.

Lehmann was sent off in 18th minute for a professional foul on striker Samuel Eto'o. Wenger reacted by substituting Pires for goalkeeper Manuel Almunia, altering the formation. In spite of the disadvantage, Arsenal took the lead in the 37th minute, after Henry's free kick was headed in by Campbell. Henry missed a chance in the second half to give Arsenal a two-nil lead before Eto'o equalised with 14 minutes left. Substitute Henrik Larsson set up Juliano Belletti to score the winner for Barcelona. Wenger used his post-match press conference to criticise referee Terje Hauge for sending off Lehmann, a view later shared by club captain Henry and FIFA president Sepp Blatter.

17 May 2006 Final	Barcelona	2–1	Arsenal	Paris, France
20:45 CEST	Oleguer (yellow card) 69'; Eto'o 76'; Belletti 81'; Larsson (yellow card) 90+3'	Report	Lehmann (red card) 18'; Eboué (yellow card) 22'; Campbell 37'; Henry (yellow card) 51'	Stadium: Stade de France; Attendance: 79,610; Referee: Terje Hauge (Norway)

== Squad statistics ==
Arsenal used a total of 34 players during the 2005–06 season and there were 16 different goalscorers. There were also six squad members who did not make a first-team appearance in the campaign. The team played in a 4–4–2 formation for much of the season, though Wenger deployed a 4–5–1 formation in Europe – a five-man midfield with Ljungberg playing behind the main striker Henry. Fàbregas featured in 50 matches – the most of any Arsenal player in the campaign; Lehmann started in all 38 league matches.

The team scored a total of 96 goals in all competitions. The highest scorer was Henry, with 33 goals, followed by Van Persie and Pires who both scored 11 goals. Four Arsenal players were sent off during the season: Lehmann, Fàbregas, Van Persie and Gilberto.

Key

No. = Squad number

Pos = Playing position

Nat. = Nationality

Apps = Appearances

GK = Goalkeeper

DF = Defender

MF = Midfielder

FW = Forward

= Yellow cards

= Red cards

Numbers in parentheses denote appearances as substitute. Players with number struck through and marked † left the club during the playing season. Players with names in italics and marked * were on loan from another club for the whole of their season with Arsenal.

No.	Pos.	Nat.	Name	Premier League		FA Cup		League Cup		Community Shield		Champions League		Total		Discipline	
No.	Pos.	Nat.	Name	Apps	Goals	Apps	Goals	Apps	Goals	Apps	Goals	Apps	Goals	Apps	Goals	A yellow rectangular card	A red rectangular card
1	GK	GER	Jens Lehmann	38	0	0	0	0	0	1	0	8	0	47	0	1	1
2	MF	FRA	Abou Diaby	9 (3)	1	1	0	1	0	0	0	(2)	0	11 (5)	1	3	0
3	DF	ENG	Ashley Cole	9 (2)	0	0	0	0	0	1	0	3	0	13 (2)	0	3	0
7	MF	FRA	Robert Pires	23 (10)	7	1	2	(1)	0	1	0	7 (5)	2	32 (16)	11	1	0
8	MF	SWE	Freddie Ljungberg	21 (4)	1	1	0	1	0	1	0	9	1	32 (4)	2	2	0
9	FW	ESP	José Antonio Reyes	22 (4)	5	2	0	3	1	(1)	0	11 (1)	0	38 (6)	6	9	0
10	FW	NED	Dennis Bergkamp	8 (16)	2	1	0	1	0	1	0	1 (3)	1	12 (19)	3	1	0
11	FW	NED	Robin van Persie	13 (11)	5	2	0	3 (1)	4	(1)	0	3 (4)	2	21 (17)	11	4	1
12	DF	CMR	Lauren	22	0	1	0	1	0	1	0	5 (1)	0	30 (1)	0	7	0
13	MF	BLR	Alexander Hleb	17 (8)	3	1	0	3	0	(1)	0	9 (1)	0	30 (10)	3	1	0
14	FW	FRA	Thierry Henry	30 (2)	27	0	0	1	1	1	0	10 (1)	5	42 (3)	33	5	0
15	MF	ESP	Cesc Fàbregas	30 (5)	3	0	0	(1)	0	1	1	10 (3)	1	41 (9)	5	7	1
16	MF	FRA	Mathieu Flamini	19 (12)	0	2	0	2 (1)	0	1	0	11 (1)	0	35 (14)	0	6	0
17	MF	CMR	Alex Song*	3 (2)	0	0	0	2	0	0	0	1 (1)	0	6 (3)	0	0	0
18	DF	FRA	Pascal Cygan	11 (1)	2	0	0	3 (1)	0	(1)	0	2 (1)	0	16 (4)	2	7	0
19	MF	BRA	Gilberto Silva	33	2	1	0	3	1	(1)	0	10	1	47 (1)	4	4	1
20	DF	SUI	Philippe Senderos	19 (1)	2	2	0	5	0	1	0	7	0	34 (1)	2	4	0
22	DF	FRA	Gaël Clichy	5 (2)	0	0	0	0	0	0	0	2 (2)	0	7 (4)	0	1	0
23	DF	ENG	Sol Campbell	20	2	1	0	2	0	1	0	6	1	29	3	1	0
24	GK	ESP	Manuel Almunia	0	0	2	0	5	0	0	0	5 (1)	0	12 (1)	0	1	0
~~25~~	FW	ENG	David Bentley †	(1)	0	0	0	(1)	0	0	0	0	0	(2)	0	0	0
25	FW	TOG	Emmanuel Adebayor	12 (1)	4	0	0	0	0	0	0	0	0	12 (1)	4	0	0
~~26~~	FW	NED	Quincy Owusu-Abeyie †	(4)	0	(1)	0	4	1	0	0	1 (2)	0	5 (7)	1	0	0
27	DF	CIV	Emmanuel Eboué	11 (7)	0	0	0	3	1	0	0	9 (2)	0	24 (9)	1	1	0
28	DF	CIV	Kolo Touré	33	0	0	0	0	0	1	0	12	1	46	1	4	0
29	MF	SWE	Sebastian Larsson	2 (1)	0	(1)	0	2 (2)	0	0	0	1	0	5 (4)	0	0	0
~~31~~	DF	ENG	Justin Hoyte	0	0	0	0	0	0	(1)	0	0	0	(1)	0	0	0
33	FW	DEN	Nicklas Bendtner	0	0	0	0	(3)	0	0	0	0	0	(3)	0	0	0
~~35~~	MF	IRL	Patrick Cregg †	0	0	0	0	(1)	0	0	0	0	0	(1)	0	0	0
36	DF	SUI	Johan Djourou	6 (1)	0	2	0	3	0	0	0	0	0	11 (1)	0	1	0
38	DF	ENG	Kerrea Gilbert	2	0	2	0	3 (1)	0	0	0	(1)	0	7 (2)	0	2	0
41	FW	ITA	Arturo Lupoli	(1)	0	0	0	2 (2)	1	0	0	0	0	2 (3)	1	0	0
44	MF	ENG	Fabrice Muamba	0	0	0	0	(2)	0	0	0	0	0	(2)	0	0	0
45	FW	IRL	Anthony Stokes	0	0	0	0	(1)	0	0	0	0	0	(1)	0	0	0
			Own Goals												2		

== See also ==
- 2005–06 in English football
- List of Arsenal F.C. seasons
