= Emmanuel Eboué =

Ivorian footballer (born 1983)

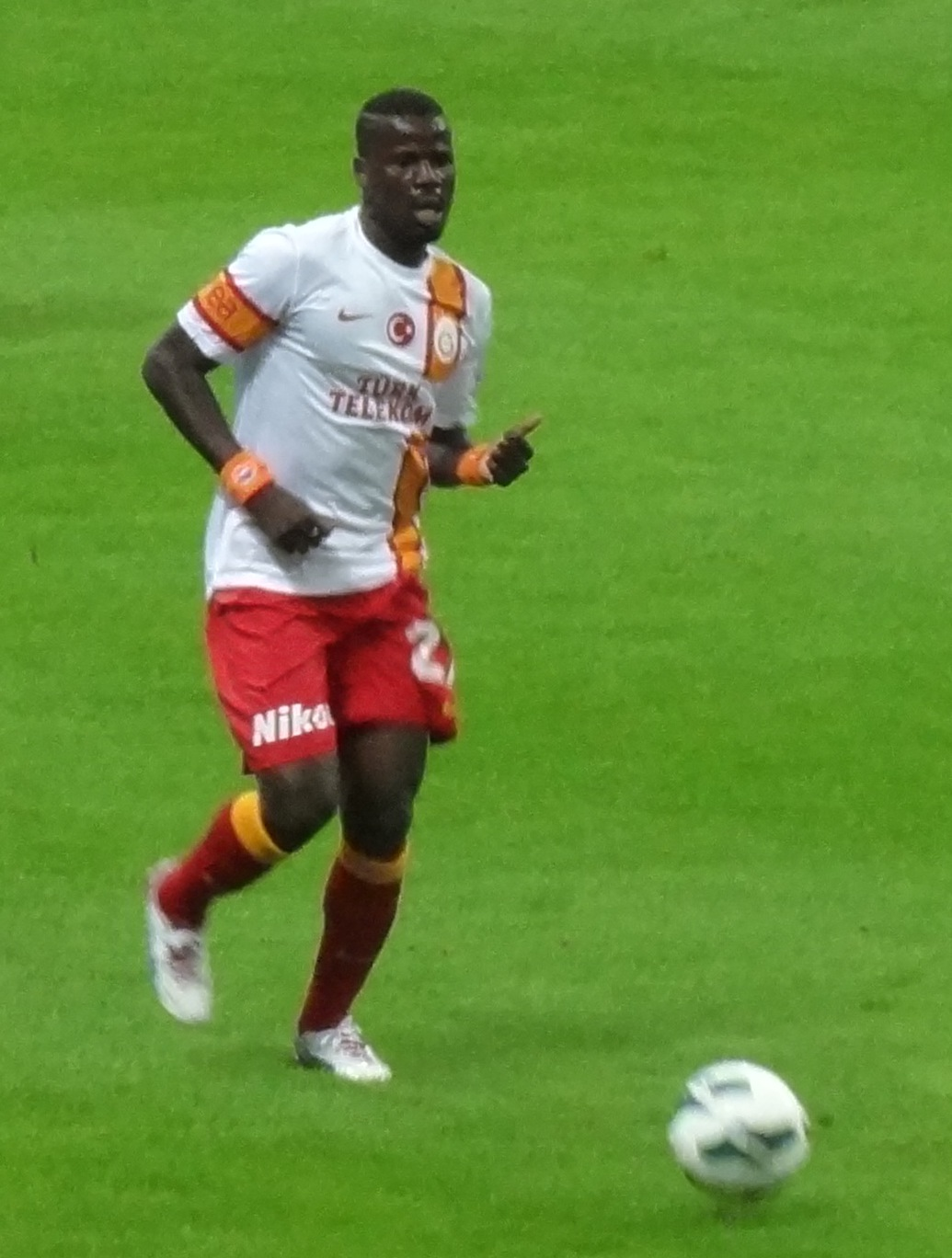
- Eboué playing for Galatasaray in 2012

Personal information
- Full name: Emmanuel Eboué
- Date of birth: 4 June 1983 (age 43)
- Place of birth: Abidjan, Ivory Coast
- Height: 1.78 m (5 ft 10 in)
- Position: Right-back

Youth career
- 2000–2001: ASEC Mimosas

Senior career*
Years	Team	Apps	(Gls)
2001–2002	ASEC Mimosas	25	(3)
2002–2004	Beveren	70	(4)
2004–2011	Arsenal	132	(5)
2011–2015	Galatasaray	77	(4)
2016	Sunderland	0	(0)
Total		304	(16)

International career
2004–2013	Ivory Coast	79	(3)
Medal record
Representing Ivory Coast
Men's football
Africa Cup of Nations
Runner-up	2012 Equatorial Guinea-Gabon
Runner-up	2006 Egypt
- * Club domestic league appearances and goals

Emmanuel Eboué (born 4 June 1983) is an Ivorian former professional footballer who played as a right-back.

Formed at ASEC Mimosas, he moved to Europe to play for Belgium's Beveren in 2002. He spent most of his career, from 2005 to 2011, with Arsenal of the Premier League, playing 214 games, including the 2006 UEFA Champions League Final. Later he moved to Galatasaray, where he played regularly and won five domestic honours in Turkey. Eboué made his international debut for the Ivory Coast in 2004, eventually earning 79 caps by 2013. He was part of their squads at five Africa Cup of Nations tournaments and two World Cups.

== Club career ==
=== Early career ===
Born in Abidjan, Eboué began his football career in the ASEC Mimosas youth academy. In 2002, Eboué moved to ASEC's Belgian parent club KSK Beveren and spent three seasons there. His impressive performances in Belgium caught the eye of Arsenal's scouts.

=== Arsenal ===
==== 2004–05 season ====
Eboué's debut came only days after signing from Beveren, in the FA Cup against Stoke City. Although he was not initially a first team regular, making just one FA Premier League appearance, as a substitute, in 2004–05, Eboué was regularly in Arsenal's reserve team. He did however contribute three appearances to Arsenal's victorious 2004–05 FA Cup campaign.

==== 2005–06 season ====
In 2005–06, Eboué made his breakthrough into the Arsenal side. He started the season mainly as a reserve player, though he scored his first goal for Arsenal in the club's 3–0 League Cup third round victory at Sunderland on 25 October 2005. Despite leaving for the African Cup of Nations in January 2006, he was immediately sent into action on his return; he made his first career Premiership start at right back against Liverpool at Anfield, replacing the injured Lauren. With Lauren injured for the rest of the season, Eboué unexpectedly held his place for the remainder of Arsenal's 2005–06 campaign.

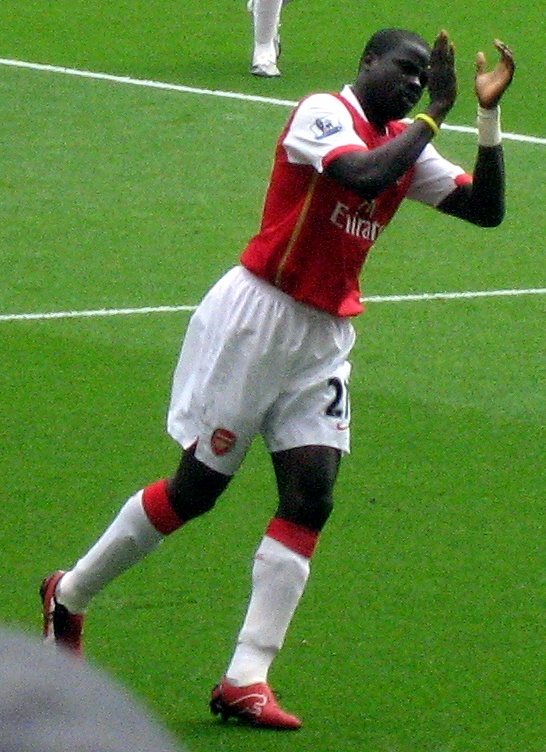
Emmanuel playing for Arsenal in August 2007

Eboué's run in the Arsenal side included matches in the UEFA Champions League knockout phase against Real Madrid, Juventus, and Villarreal. Impressed with the way the Ivorian adapted to the increased pace of the Premiership and pressure of the Champions League, Arsenal manager Arsène Wenger even compared Eboué to the legendary Brazilian winger Garrincha after an energetic performance in the 1 April 2006 game against Aston Villa. Eboué continued in the starting line-up for Arsenal in the 2006 UEFA Champions League Final at the Stade de France.

==== 2006–07 season ====
Eboué started the 2006–07 season, and was named the Arsenal Player of the Month for September. However, he was injured in an international and spent the whole of the month of October out with injury. He made his first team return as a substitute in the 1–0 defeat by West Ham United on 5 November, and started the League Cup win over Everton later that same week. He scored his second Arsenal goal in their 3–1 Champions League victory over Hamburger SV on 21 November 2006. Persistent ankle problems have plagued him throughout December 2006 and January 2007. He attempted to make many comebacks, mostly against high-profile teams such as Liverpool, in the FA Cup third Round and Manchester United, but he was unable to come through them unscathed. Wenger decided to wait until there was no chance that there would be a recurrence of the injury. He came off the bench for Armand Traoré in the League Cup final against Chelsea. He started the match against Blackburn Rovers in the FA cup 5th Round Replay, only for his ankle to get injured again from a studs-up challenge from Blackburn winger Morten Gamst Pedersen, which the referee also missed. In May 2007, Eboué signed a new long-term contract with Arsenal.

==== 2007–08 season ====
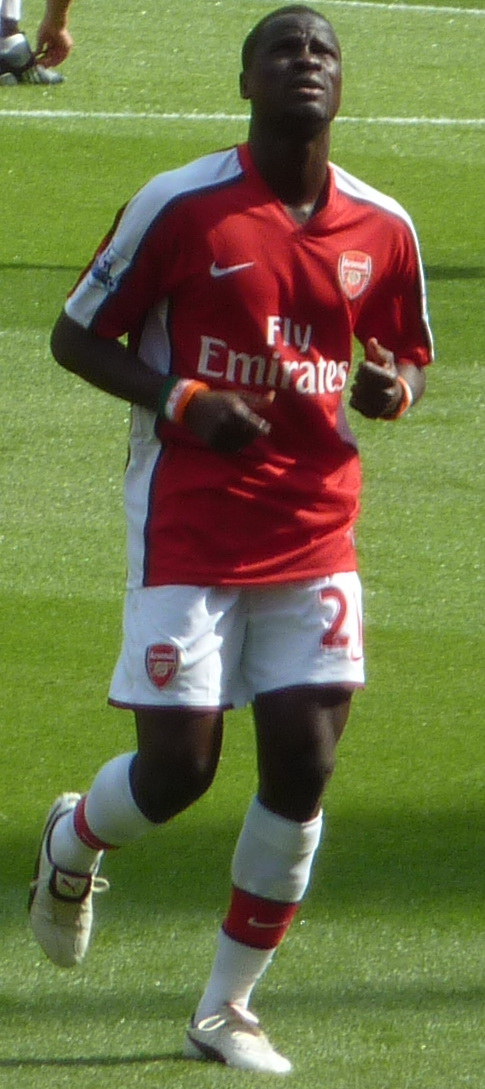
Eboué in action for the Gunners

From the start of the 2007–08 season, Arsène Wenger stated his intention to move Eboué into a role on the right wing, following the signing of Bacary Sagna. On 20 September 2008, Eboué scored his first Premier League goal against Bolton Wanderers in an away match, which Arsenal won 3–1.

==== 2008–09 season ====
During the 2008–09 season, he was frequently criticised by Arsenal fans after some less-than-satisfactory performances. In December 2008 against Wigan Athletic at the Emirates Stadium, Eboué played particularly poorly after being brought on as a substitute. He made many unforced errors to the point where a small section of Arsenal fans began to boo him. Eboué continued to lose possession and in the second half, Eboué tackled his own player and gifted possession to Wigan. He was subsequently substituted. This dramatic dip in form also coincided with other problems in the team, notably the absence of teammate Theo Walcott (who also played regularly on the right wing) through injury. Further appearances were confined to playing as a wing-forward or right back. On 8 March 2009, he scored the third goal against Burnley in the FA Cup fifth round match. On 14 March, he scored two goals (one a penalty) in the Gunners' 4–0 hammering of Blackburn Rovers.

==== 2009–10 season ====
He scored his first goal of the 2009–10 season for Arsenal against Wigan Athletic at the Emirates Stadium, on 19 September 2009, the fixture in which he was booed by a small section of his own fans in the previous season. On 9 March 2010, in the second leg of Arsenal's Champions League tie at home to Porto, Eboué scored the fourth goal in a 5–0 win having come on as a substitute. In March 2010, Eboué dismissed speculation he would leave Arsenal and pledged to see out the remainder of his contract.

==== 2010–11 season ====
At the end of 2010, late October or November, Eboué signed another long-term contract with Arsenal.

In April 2011, Eboué scored for Arsenal in their 3–1 win over Blackpool at Bloomfield Road, with a powerful strike from his weaker left foot, which helped keep Arsenal's title hopes alive. In the following match against Liverpool at the Emirates Stadium, however, he conceded a last-minute penalty by pushing Lucas Leiva in the back which denied the club victory and left them six points adrift of the leaders. On 8 May 2011, he was an unused substitute in the game against Stoke City at the Britannia Stadium in a 3–1 defeat.

At the end of the 2010–11 season, Eboué made 27 appearances in total and scored once in all competitions.

=== Galatasaray ===
==== 2011–12 season ====
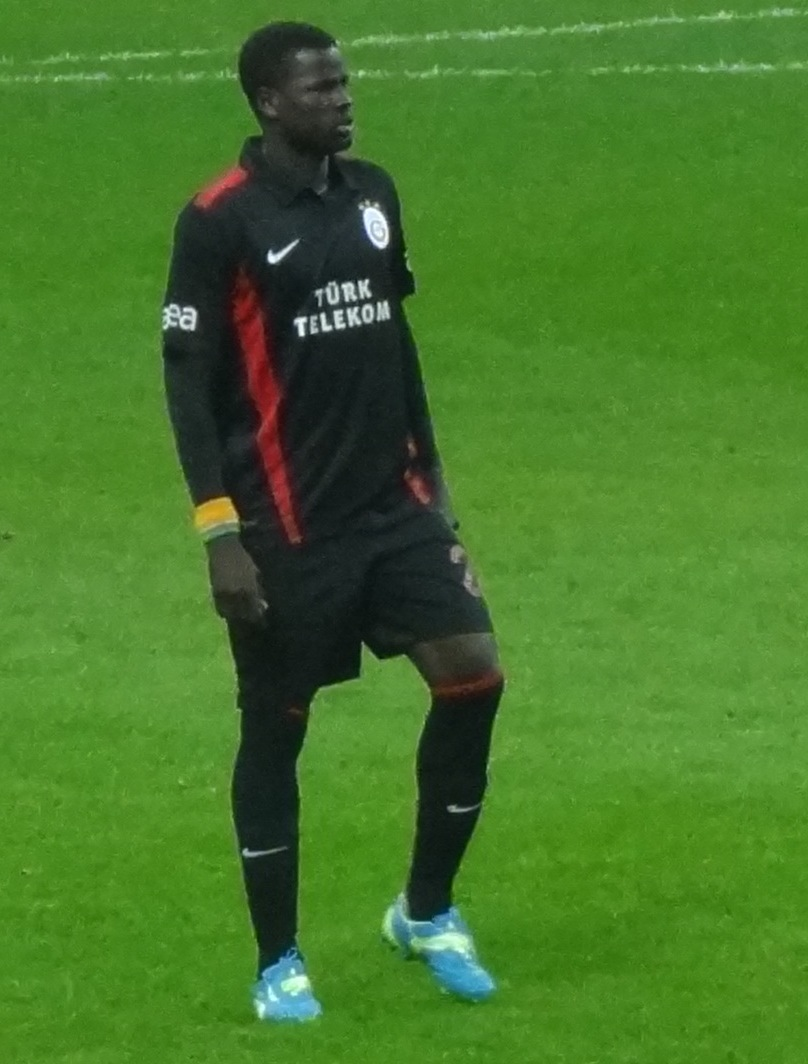
Eboué playing for Galatasaray in 2012

At the start of the 2011–12 season, Eboué lost his squad number to new signing Gervinho, who was given the number 27 shirt upon his arrival, which left Eboué's future at the club unclear. On 16 August 2011, Eboué completed a move to Turkish club Galatasaray for €3.5 million in four-year contract (worth €2.35 million a season plus bonus). Following his move to Galatasaray, Eboué revealed that manager Arsène Wenger told him he would have few first-team opportunities and to listen to interest to join the Turkish side. On 11 September 2011, Eboué made his debut in the clubs shirt in a 2–0 loss against İstanbul Büyükşehir Belediyesi.

In the match between Galatasaray and Beşiktaş which was 0–0, Eboué was pelted with missiles from the crowd whenever he neared the touchline. On 3 December 2011, Eboué scored his first goal against Gençlerbirliği, which was the only goal in a 1–0 win. He played 31 matches in the league as he secured his first league title of his professional career.

==== 2012–13 season ====
In Eboué's second season at the club, the Ivorian helped the team claim victory in the Turkish Super Cup on 12 August 2012, playing the whole game in an entertaining 3–2 victory over rivals Fenerbahçe at the Kazım Karabekir Stadium in Erzurum. Eboué was part of the squad that surprisingly fell 2–1 to Turkish Second Division side 1461 Trabzon in December 2012.

During the 2013 winter transfer window, he was joined by national teammate Didier Drogba on 28 January 2013. On 9 April 2013, in the Champions League quarter-final second leg against La Liga club Real Madrid, Eboué scored from long range as Galatarsay secured a 3–2 win, falling 5–3 on aggregate. Eboué helped Galatasaray defend their league title, playing the full ninety minutes in their 4–2 defeat of Sivasspor on 5 May, a win which secured the club's 19th Turkish Super Lig title. In Gala's following match on 12 May, the Kıtalar Arası Derbi against Fenerbahçe, Galatasaray lost the match 2–1 but Eboué and Drogba were subject to racist abuse from Fenerbahçe fans during the game and no punishment was handed down on the club or its supporters.

==== 2014–15 season ====
Eboue was left out of the main squad by Cesare Prandelli at the beginning of 2014–15 season. As a consequence, he played with the U21 team the whole season. As Galatasaray's foreign player limit was full, he could not return to the team after Prandelli had left. At the end of the season, his contract was not renewed and Eboué left the club.

=== Sunderland ===
On 9 March 2016, Eboué signed a short-term contract with Sunderland. On 31 March 2016, Eboué began serving a one-year ban from all football-related activity, for failing to pay a former agent. He was released by Sunderland in April 2016, having not played for the club.

=== Later career ===
In July 2017, Eboué trained with Hungarian Ferencváros, but could not agree on a contract with the club.

In October 2017, Eboué was looking to join Türk Ocağı Limasol, a team in the Turkish Republic of Northern Cyprus. The move fell through due to issues with his blood that were discovered in a medical test.

In December 2017, Eboué was offered a job coaching the under-14 team at former club Galatasaray, when their manager Fatih Terim was made aware of Eboué's financial problems.

== International career ==
Eboué debuted for Ivory Coast in 2004 and had generally been a regular fixture in the defence operating at right-back for the Elephants, along with former teammate Kolo Touré. On 18 November 2009, Eboué scored his first goal for Ivory Coast in a 2–2 draw against Germany. He was named in Sven-Göran Eriksson's Ivory Coast squad for the 2010 FIFA World Cup.

== Personal life ==
Eboué is a Christian. He had three children with his Belgian wife, Aurélie, whom he married before joining Arsenal. Their son, Mathis, is currently a player of the Chelsea academy.

In December 2017, Eboué told the Sunday Mirror that he is poor and homeless due to his divorce and bad investments that were under his former wife's control. In June 2019, Eboué spoke about his ongoing struggles with mental health. In 2026, he claimed he has been ruined by his divorce, having lost everything, his relation with his ex-wife being really difficult : "she even refuses to give recent pictures of my children", his relationship with his son who has signed professional with Chelsea is non-existent.

== Career statistics ==
=== Club ===
- Allocation of appearances in the various seasons before his Arsenal career is uncertain, and therefore applied to the League section for each club, as per time he spent there.

Appearances and goals by club, season and competition:
Club	Season	League			National cup (Note: Includes Belgian Cup, FA Cup, Turkish Cup)		League cup (Note: Includes Football League Cup)		Continental		Other		Total	
Club	Season	Division	Apps	Goals	Apps	Goals	Apps	Goals	Apps	Goals	Apps	Goals	Apps	Goals
ASEC Mimosas	2001–02	Ivory Coast Ligue 1	25	3	—		—		—		—		25	3
Beveren	2002–03	Belgian Pro League	23	0			—		—		—		23	0
Beveren	2003–04	Belgian Pro League	30	2			—		—		—		30	2
Beveren	2004–05	Belgian Pro League	17	2			—		7 (Note: Appearances in UEFA Cup)	0	—		24	2
Beveren	Total		70	4			0	0	7	0	0	0	77	4
Arsenal	2004–05	Premier League	1	0	3	0	0	0	0	0	—		4	0
Arsenal	2005–06	Premier League	18	0	0	0	3	1	11 (Note: Appearances in UEFA Champions League)	0	0	0	32	1
Arsenal	2006–07	Premier League	24	0	2	0	3	0	6	1	—		35	1
Arsenal	2007–08	Premier League	23	0	2	0	1	0	10	0	—		36	0
Arsenal	2008–09	Premier League	28	3	5	1	0	0	11	0	—		44	4
Arsenal	2009–10	Premier League	25	1	0	0	1	0	10	2	—		36	3
Arsenal	2010–11	Premier League	13	1	3	0	5	0	6	0	—		27	1
Arsenal	Total		132	5	15	1	13	1	54	3	0	0	214	10
Galatasaray	2011–12	Super Lig	31	3	2	0	—		—		—		33	3
Galatasaray	2012–13	Super Lig	28	0	0	0	—		10	1	1 (Note: Appearance in Turkish Super Cup)	0	39	1
Galatasaray	2013–14	Super Lig	18	1	3	0	—		8	0	1	0	31	1
Galatasaray	2014–15	Super Lig	0	0	0	0	—		0	0	—		0	0
Galatasaray	Total		77	4	5	0	0	0	18	1	2	0	103	5
Sunderland	2015–16	Premier League	0	0	0	0	0	0	—		—		0	0
Career total			304	15	20	1	13	1	79	4	2	0	416	21

=== International ===
Appearances and goals by national team and year
National team	Year	Apps	Goals
Ivory Coast	2004	5	0
Ivory Coast	2005	4	0
Ivory Coast	2006	12	0
Ivory Coast	2007	4	0
Ivory Coast	2008	16	0
Ivory Coast	2009	10	1
Ivory Coast	2010	14	1
Ivory Coast	2011	6	0
Ivory Coast	2012	7	1
Ivory Coast	2013	5	0
Total		79	3

Scores and results list Ivory Coast's goal tally first, score column indicates score after each Eboué goal.

List of international goals scored by Emmanuel Eboué
No.	Date	Venue	Opponent	Score	Result	Competition
1	18 November 2009	Veltins-Arena, Gelsenkirchen, Germany	Germany	1–1	2–2	Friendly
2	4 September 2010	Stade Félix Houphouët-Boigny, Abidjan, Ivory Coast	Rwanda	3–0	3–0	2012 African Cup of Nations qualification
3	30 January 2012	Estadio de Malabo, Malabo, Equatorial Guinea	Angola	1–0	2–0	2012 African Cup of Nations

== Honours ==
Arsenal

- Football League Cup runner-up: 2006–07, 2010–11
- UEFA Champions League runner-up: 2005–06

Galatasaray

- Süper Lig: 2011–12, 2012–13, 2014–15
- Turkish Cup: 2013–14, 2014–15
- Turkish Super Cup: 2012, 2013
