= Gilberto Silva =

Brazilian footballer (born 1976)

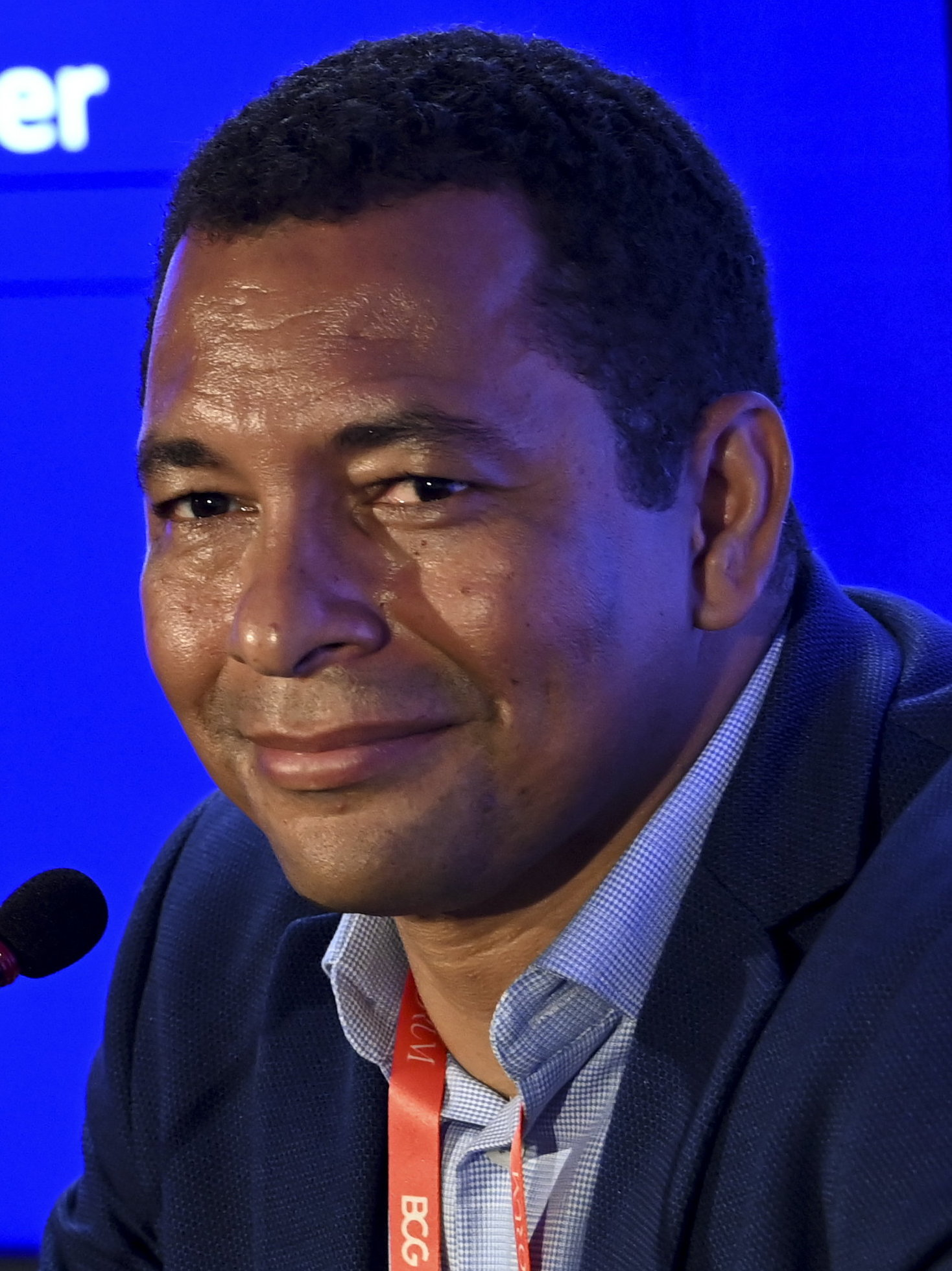
- Gilberto Silva in 2021

Personal information
- Full name: Gilberto Aparecido da Silva
- Date of birth: 7 October 1976 (age 50)
- Place of birth: Lagoa da Prata, Minas Gerais, Brazil
- Height: 1.85 m (6 ft 1 in)
- Position: Defensive midfielder

Youth career
- 1988–1993: América Mineiro

Senior career*
Years	Team	Apps	(Gls)
1997–2000	América Mineiro	49	(2)
2000–2002	Atlético Mineiro	44	(6)
2002–2008	Arsenal	170	(17)
2008–2011	Panathinaikos	78	(5)
2011–2013	Grêmio	62	(2)
2013–2014	Atlético Mineiro	20	(1)
Total		423	(33)

International career
2001–2010	Brazil	89	(3)
Medal record
Men's football
Representing Brazil
FIFA World Cup
Winner	2002 Korea/Japan
FIFA Confederations Cup
Winner	2005 Germany
Winner	2009 South Africa
Copa America
Winner	2007 Venezuela
Olympic Games
Bronze medal – third place	2008 Beijing
- * Club domestic league appearances and goals

Gilberto Aparecido da Silva (Brazilian Portuguese: [ʒiwˈbɛʁtu ˈsiwvɐ]; born 7 October 1976) is a Brazilian former professional footballer who played as a defensive midfielder, most notably for Brazilian side Atlético Mineiro and for English Premier League club Arsenal, as well as for the Brazil national team. He currently serves as an ambassador for both Arsenal and FIFA.

Born and raised in poverty in the Brazilian municipality of Lagoa da Prata, Gilberto joined the youth academy at local club América Mineiro, where he made his senior debut as a centre-back in 1998. After starring the following season, where he helped gain the club promotion into the Campeonato Brasileiro Série A, he joined city rivals Atlético Mineiro. During his time at Atlético, Gilberto transitioned into a defensive midfielder under head coach Carlos Alberto Parreira, and flourished in his new role, gaining a call-up to the Brazil national team for the 2002 FIFA World Cup, where he featured prominently as his country won the tournament.

As a result of his World Cup performances, Gilberto garnered a move to the Premier League to sign for Arsenal that summer for a fee of £4.5 million. During his six years at Arsenal, Gilberto gained a reputation as a world class defensive midfielder, and starred in a midfield duo alongside Patrick Vieira. He would feature as a member of the Invincibles, where he captured his first top-flight league title as his team went undefeated the whole season, as well as winning two FA Cups. Gilberto also holds distinct records at Arsenal, recording their first goal at the Emirates Stadium, as well as their fastest ever goal, scoring in 21 seconds from kickoff against PSV Eindhoven in the 2002–03 UEFA Champions League. After departing Arsenal, Gilberto relocated to Greece, playing for Panathinaikos, where he won a domestic double. He then returned to Brazil in 2011, signing for Grêmio, where he remained for two years, before returning to Atlético to win the 2013 Copa Libertadores prior to retiring.

Gilberto featured at senior level for much of his international career, representing Brazil over a period of 9 years. He enjoyed a period of sustained success with his country, as he featured prominently in their victorious campaign at the 2002 FIFA World Cup, as well as being a core component as the team also won the 2005 FIFA Confederations Cup, while also featuring as captain in their Copa América win in 2007. After retaining the Confederations Cup in 2009, Gilberto expressed his desire to prolong his club career, which coincided with limited playing time for Brazil. He retired from international football after the 2010 FIFA World Cup, having made 93 appearances for Brazil.

== Early life ==
As a child, Gilberto lived in the city of Lagoa da Prata with his father (a blacksmith), his mother (a housewife) and three sisters. His family lived in a small house which his father built, in the district of Usina Luciânia. Despite financial hardship, causing his sisters and him to share a single room, he had a relatively carefree childhood: he describes it as "[a time when] I had no responsibility in my life, I played football on the street with cousins and friends, and we never had any contact with drugs or violence". In 1988 (aged 12), he got the chance to break out of poverty by playing football, joining América Mineiro as a youth player. It was during these years at América Mineiro that Gilberto was taught defensive discipline by playing as a central defender. When not playing football, Gilberto was taught furniture-making skills by his father, which he would come to use in the following years. In 1991, Gilberto's father retired leaving the 16-year-old to provide financially for his whole family, a task made more difficult by his mother's ill-health.

We were a poor family and had to work hard. That's why, as a boy, I had to take those jobs as a labourer and in the factory. But I'm glad I had that tough start. It makes me identify with people who are not so lucky.

— Gilberto Silva

Because of the low wage at América Mineiro, he was forced to quit football to take various jobs as a labourer, a carpenter, and a worker in a sweet factory. It looked as if this would be the end of his childhood dream. As a factory-worker Gilberto earned the equivalent of about £50 a month by 2002 rates.

== Club career ==
=== Early career ===
In 1997, Gilberto's friends convinced him to give football another try, which led to him re-signing for América Mineiro in 1997, this time as a full-time professional. Aged 22, Gilberto played as a central defender for the first team. During his first season for América Mineiro he was regarded as a key player by the club, despite being criticised by some fans for inconsistency. He helped them win the Série B division, and consequently gain promotion to Série A.

During Gilberto's third season at América Mineiro, with the team back to Série B after relegation in Série A in 1999, he scored three goals, helping the club reach the second stage where they were eliminated by Vila Nova in the quarterfinals. In 2000, aged 24, he joined rival club Atlético Mineiro. In his first season for the club, he fractured his right tibia and, as a result, missed a number of games. In his second season, he was moved by the manager Carlos Alberto Parreira from central defence to a defensive midfield role where he flourished. He scored three goals in the 2001 season and became a revelation in Brazilian club football.

=== Arsenal ===
Gilberto's performance in the 2002 FIFA World Cup caught the attention of many coaches. Gilberto expressed a desire to move to England, saying, "It would be fantastic to play against the likes of David Beckham again." As a result, FA Premier League clubs Aston Villa and Arsenal led the chase to sign him. In August, while still under contract to Atlético Mineiro, Gilberto joined Arsenal on their pre-season tour of Austria; while he had not yet signed for Arsenal the deal looked set to go ahead. However, complications arose when a transfer embargo was placed on Atlético Mineiro due to unpaid wages to some players at the club, including Gilberto. There was also an issue of obtaining a UK work permit for Gilberto. Despite the complications, Gilberto ended a summer of speculation and joined Arsenal on 7 August 2002 for a fee of £4.5 million. Upon signing Gilberto, Arsenal manager Arsène Wenger said, "What I like was the fact that he kept things simple. He can play all across the midfield but the holding role just in front of the defence is what he does best."

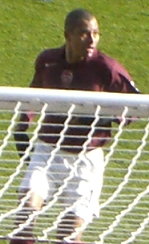
Gilberto defending a corner for Arsenal at Highbury in April 2006

When Gilberto moved to England and began training with Arsenal, he bought a house in St Albans, South Hertfordshire. Having been used to life in small Brazilian towns, he initially struggled to adapt to the new way of life in London. However, on the pitch, he settled in very quickly. On 11 August 2002 he made his Arsenal debut as a substitute against Liverpool in the second half of the FA Community Shield game in which he scored the winning goal. As the 2002–03 FA Premier League season began, Gilberto faced stiff competition for a place in midfield from compatriot Edu. After two substitute appearances, Gilberto finally broke into the starting eleven on 27 August, helping Arsenal to a 5–2 win against West Bromwich Albion. Gilberto's good form continued as he set a new record for the fastest goal scored in the UEFA Champions League, scoring after 20.07 seconds against PSV on 25 September 2002.

2003–04 was an even better season for Gilberto, as he was instrumental in helping Arsenal win the Premier League title whilst going the entire season unbeaten. He played in 32 of Arsenal's 38 unbeaten Premier League games during the season. His next season started equally impressively, as he scored the first goal in Arsenal's 3–1 Community Shield win over Manchester United at the Millennium Stadium. During the opening games of the season, he started to experience severe pain in his back, and after a match at Bolton Wanderers on 27 September 2004, a scan revealed he had fractured his back. At first it was reported that he would be out of action for a month. Later reports suggested the injury could be season-threatening.

If you never give up then you always have a chance, and they got a great example from a World Cup winner. You only have to see where Gilberto was when we got the ball back and where he was when he scored his goal. Remember this is a guy who has won everything.

— Arsène Wenger

Gilberto's doctor ordered him to wear a back brace for three months to aid the healing of the fractured bone. Gilberto returned to his native Brazil for the duration of his rehabilitation. During his time there, he doubted whether he would ever be able to play football again, due to speculation that his injury could threaten his career. Despite his concerns, his long rehabilitation time paid off as he made a full recovery. He made his footballing comeback in Arsenal's 4–1 victory over Norwich City on 22 April 2005. During the whole 2004–05 season, Gilberto was injured for 7 months and played only 17 games. His absence, combined with Arsenal's slump in form at the time, led to much discussion regarding the importance of Gilberto to the Arsenal team; some suggesting that Arsenal struggled without him.

In June 2005, football agent Jacques Lichtenstein took Atlético Mineiro to court over Gilberto's transfer in 2002. Lichtenstein's lawyer argued that he and his informal partner, Ronny Rosenthal, never received an allegedly agreed 10% commission from Gilberto's £4.5 million transfer to Arsenal from Atlético Mineiro in July 2002. Arsène Wenger and Arsenal vice-chairman David Dein both gave evidence in court, saying that Arsenal dealt directly with Atlético Mineiro and that no agent was involved in the deal. The case was conducted before The Hon. Mr Justice Jack, who on 29 June ruled against Lichtenstein, and ordered the claimants pay Atletico Minéiro £94,000 in legal costs. A year later, the case could have caused problems for Arsenal, when former player Ashley Cole criticised the club for "hypocrisy and double standards" in the way they approached Gilberto.

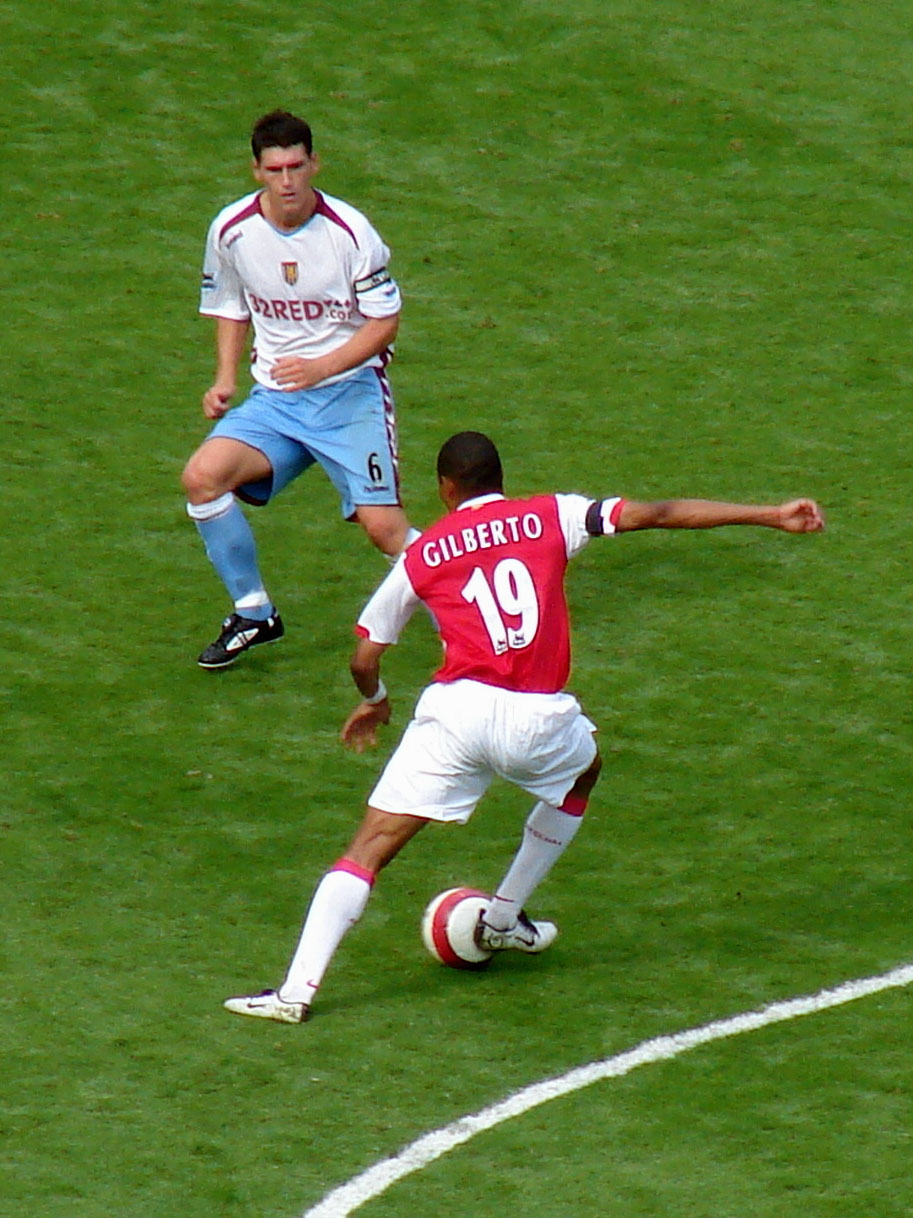
Gilberto (right) faces up to ex-Aston Villa captain Gareth Barry

With legal matters subsided, the 2005–06 season began. Following midfielder and team captain Patrick Vieira's departure from Arsenal, Gilberto became a senior member of the Arsenal team. Shortly into the season, in September 2005, his desire to see his career out with the club led to Gilberto extending his Arsenal contract to June 2009. A month later this loyalty was repaid when, on 18 October 2005, Gilberto made his first appearance for Arsenal as captain, against Sparta Prague. Although Gilberto had a period of bad form during the winter months of the season, his good defensive performances during the latter stages of the UEFA Champions League (in particular, games against Real Madrid, Juventus and Villarreal) gained him praise. On 17 May 2006 Gilberto played for Arsenal in the UEFA Champions League Final against FC Barcelona, which Arsenal lost 2–1.

Following the departure of defender Sol Campbell and retirement of striker Dennis Bergkamp in the summer of 2006, Gilberto was announced as Arsenal's vice-captain for the 2006–07 season. He began the season well, as he scored the first ever goal at the Dutch DSB Stadion in a pre-season friendly match. He then scored Arsenal's first ever goal in a competitive match at the Emirates Stadium in a 1–1 draw with Aston Villa. His good form continued for Arsenal as he scored several league goals, garnering praise for his performances as stand-in captain while Thierry Henry was injured. Gilberto and his agent (Paulo Villana) also reiterated the player's desire to honour his contract with the Gunners. Meanwhile, Gilberto's good form carried through to the second half of the season. Even though Arsenal only managed to finish fourth in the league, he ended the season as Arsenal's second highest scorer with 10 Premier League goals. The explanation for his unusually high tally is the fact that Henry suffered two lengthy injury spells, in which Gilberto stepped up as captain to take penalties. Gilberto's goal scoring record combined with his own good form in midfield and his leadership of Wenger's youthful squad led some Arsenal fans and football pundits to label Gilberto as Arsenal's best player of the season, and one of the best in the Premier League.

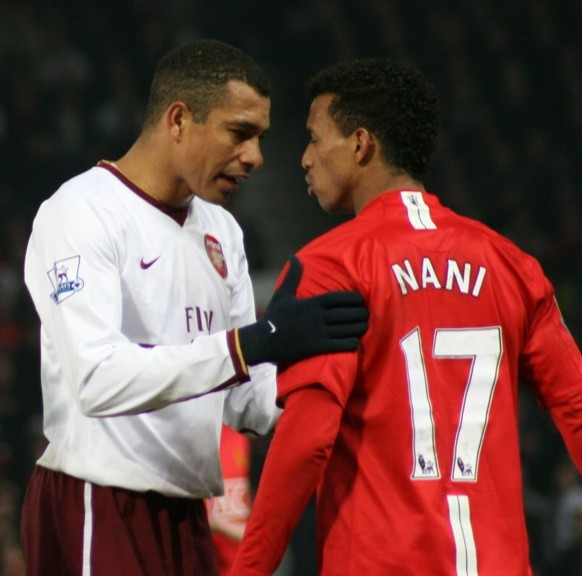
Gilberto Silva discussing with Nani

The buildup of the 2007–08 season saw Arsenal captain Thierry Henry leave the club to join Barcelona. This coupled with the fact that Gilberto was Arsenal's vice-captain during the 2006–07 season led many people to assume that Gilberto would take over Henry's role. However, to the surprise of Gilberto, William Gallas was given the captain's armband instead. In August, after returning to Arsenal's pre-season training late due to his involvement in the Copa América tournament (and thus missing the start of the season), Gilberto then lost his place in the first team to young midfielder Mathieu Flamini. This reignited speculation linking Gilberto to Italy due to rumours that he was unhappy being on the bench at Arsenal. However, reports that he was being snubbed at the club were dismissed by Wenger, who insisted that Gilberto would remain at Arsenal to fight for his place. Despite this, in October 2007, rumours in the press re-emerged that Gilberto was angry at Wenger for being asked to play in defence in a League Cup game against Sheffield United, and had resultantly refused to play. Gilberto ended up playing the game in midfield though, with he and Wenger both denying rumours of a rift with each other. Gilberto subsequently commented that while he was not happy being a substitute, he would remain professional and fight for his place at the club. Also in October, Gilberto ceded the Brazilian captaincy to Lúcio upon his compatriot's return from injury.

Through the winter months of the 2007–08 season, Gilberto started a limited number of games for the Gunners, though he kept his place in the Brazil team, starting several games for A Seleção. After becoming more and more frustrated with not playing regularly, Gilberto admitted in February 2008 that he had been made to feel "totally useless" by Wenger. Despite this, he declined to make a decision on his future; something which prompted Wenger to promise talks with Gilberto. Amidst Gilberto's frustration at Arsenal, he targeted playing in Brazil's Olympic team in Beijing during August 2008; a competition which he had never played in. Off the pitch, Gilberto was reported to have passed his UK Citizenship test, and that he would subsequently apply for a British passport. April saw Gilberto's season take a turn for the better; making 5 starts – a substantial portion of his seasonal total of 12 – even managing to score a goal. The goal came against Reading on 19 April, and despite its deflective nature leading to some classing it as a possible own goal, the Premier League's Dubious Goals Committee eventually credited the goal to Gilberto. However, Gilberto's return to favour did not stop Arsenal's 2007–08 season ending trophyless. The club subsequently faced the possibility of several players leaving; among those rumoured to leave was Flamini, the player who had kept Gilberto out of the first team. The Frenchman ended up moving to A.C. Milan on 6 May, and a subsequent gap was left in the Arsenal midfield. Gilberto became less likely to leave the club during Summer 2008 as a result, and Wenger remarked that he wanted to keep Gilberto; Gilberto saying he wanted to stay and possibly even renew his contract at Arsenal. Gilberto finished the 2007–08 season with 36 appearances for Arsenal, albeit only 12 of these being Premier League starts.

=== Panathinaikos ===
Following Brazil's summer international games, he was seriously linked with a move to Greek club Panathinaikos. The speculation concluded when Gilberto agreed terms with the Athenian side on 17 July 2008, for an undisclosed fee. During his first season at the club, Gilberto helped the side reach the UEFA Champions League Round of 16. He managed to win both the 2009–10 Greek Championship and Cup with Panathinaikos, being the starting holding midfielder and producing numerous solid displays. In Gilberto's final home game for Panathinaikos on 23 May 2011, he scored the winning goal in a 1–0 victory over PAOK, for the League playoffs. Two days later, he played his final game for the team, winning 2–0 against AEK Athens.

=== Later career ===
On 23 May 2011, Gilberto ended his 9-year career in Europe by signing an 18-month deal with Grêmio, of Porto Alegre.

In the past, Gilberto hinted that he may one day return to Brazil to play for Atlético Mineiro. After his football career finishes, he has said that he would like to, "Live in a small farm and ride a horse and have all of my family next to me." On 10 November 2012, it was confirmed that Gilberto's wish would be granted, as he signed a pre-contract with Galo.

On 9 December 2012, Gilberto was welcomed at Aeroporto dos Confins by fans of Atlético Mineiro, returning to the Belo Horizonte side after 11 years away. Gilberto spoke of winning the 2013 Copa Libertadores title upon his return. Gilberto achieved this wish on 24 July 2013, with a final victory over Club Olimpia of Paraguay.

On 11 December 2015, after two years without a club, he officially announced his retirement as a footballer, intending to pursue a career as an international consultant for clubs and players.

== International career ==
In October 2001, his good performances from that year earned Gilberto a call up to the Brazil national team ("A Seleção") by Luiz Felipe Scolari for the 2002 World Cup qualification games. He made his international debut against Chile on 7 October, coming on as a substitute. On 7 November, he made his debut in the starting line-up of the national team against Bolivia. His international career continued to flourish in early 2002: he scored twice against Bolivia and once against Iceland. In 2002, he was a surprise inclusion in the Brazil squad for the 2002 FIFA World Cup in South Korea and Japan. He was expected to play a small part in the tournament. However, defensive midfielder and Brazilian team captain Emerson was injured in training just before the first World Cup game. In light of the setback, coach Scolari called upon Gilberto to fill the gap which Emerson left. Gilberto ended up playing in every minute of every match of the tournament, which Brazil went on to win. In the words of Veja magazine, Gilberto "carried the piano for Ronaldo and Rivaldo to play their tunes on". He was not without attacking use either, setting up Ronaldo's semi-final goal to put Brazil through to the final. It was Gilberto's performance in this tournament which led to him being classed as one of the top defensive midfielders in the world.

On 22 June 2005, Gilberto played in Brazil's 2–2 draw against Japan, in his only game of the 2005 FIFA Confederations Cup. His absence as a first team regular could be explained by his lack of games, and thus match fitness, for Arsenal during the season leading up to the tournament. Gilberto's appearance in the tournament gained him a winners medal, as Brazil went on to win the competition. On the back of his good Champions League form, Gilberto was selected for the Brazil national football team for the 2006 FIFA World Cup. Gilberto was substituted on in two games, and started twice due to another injury to Emerson. Brazil were beaten 1–0 by France in the quarter final. Following Brazil's World Cup disappointment, midfielder Juninho called for the older members of the Brazil squad (including Gilberto) to retire from international football. On the back of Gilberto's childhood idol Dunga being appointed Brazil coach, Gilberto did not take Juninho's advice, and subsequently continued his international career.

On 1 June 2007, Gilberto captained Brazil against England at the first senior international match at the new Wembley Stadium. Having had a seemingly good headed goal disallowed after 20 minutes, he set up Brazil's only goal as the game ended 1–1. During the summer of 2007 Gilberto played in the Copa América tournament, in which he was chosen to captain Brazil in the absence of Lúcio. They went on to beat Argentina 3–0 in the final, though he missed the final game through suspension. Following the end of the 2008–09 Premier League season, Gilberto was called up to the Brazil national team for the 2009 FIFA Confederations Cup, in which they retained the title with a 3-2 win over the United States and for the 2010 FIFA World Cup qualifiers during the summer as well as a tour of the United States.

== Style of play ==
Gilberto is often called "the invisible wall". His play often goes unnoticed as he positions himself between the two centre backs and the rest of midfield, breaking up opposition attacks before they gather momentum. In this role, he is a part of the defensive unit for both club and country. When playing, he is more passive than most players in defence. Rather than tackle an opponent, he is more likely to shadow him, thus pushing him back. As a result, he has an unusually clean record for a defensive midfielder: he has twice gone 45 games or more without receiving a single booking during his Arsenal career.

Gilberto is good at helping to defend against opponents who play a long ball game because he often man marks the opposition's attacking target-man. This cuts off the opposition's supply to the strikers, and thus forces the long-ball team to play through the midfield, something to which long-ball teams are not particularly suited.

Despite Gilberto's high pass completion rate, his passing has been described as erratic in the past.

According to ProZone (a data analysis system used by football managers) figures cited by The Sunday Times in January 2007, Gilberto was, together with Paul Scholes of Manchester United and Frank Lampard of Chelsea, one of the few midfielders in England to attain "the elite Champions League level" of performance.

== Outside playing career ==
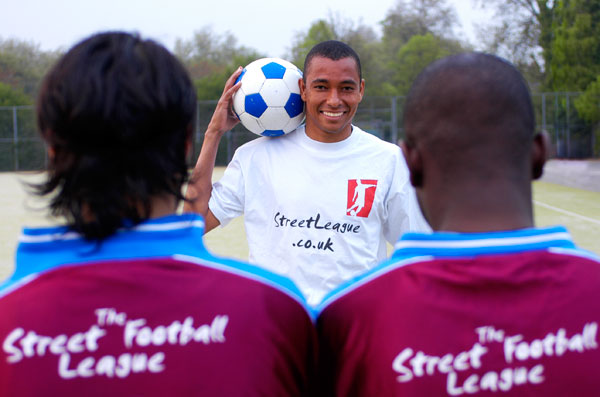
Gilberto Silva at a photo shoot for The Street League

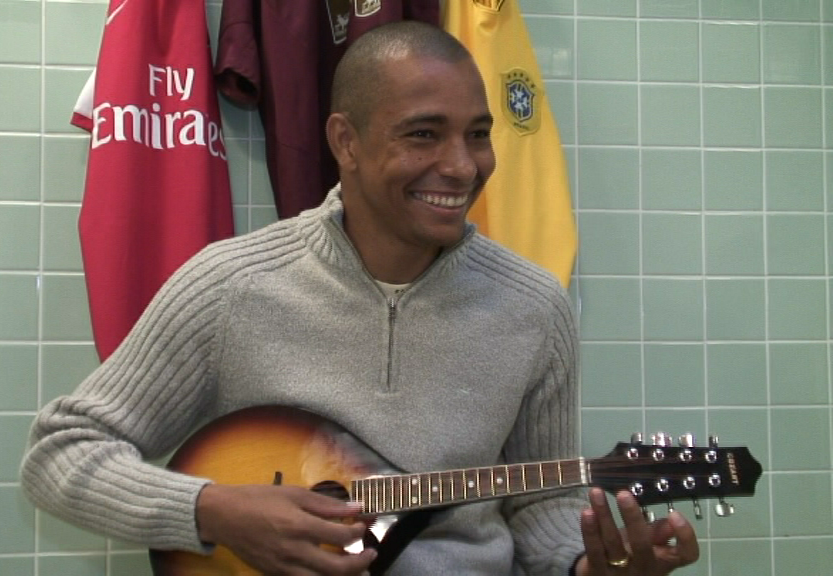
Gilberto playing a mandolin

Gilberto is a patron of The Street League, a UK based charity which organises football matches for homeless people, refugees and asylum seekers. In June 2003, he travelled to Brazil on tour with 17 Street League players. The tour included a visit to his home town Lagoa da Prata and games against local shanty town teams at the Maracanã stadium.

Gilberto plays the guitar and used to play the mandolin; whilst with the Brazil squad on the buses, he would often be a part of customary music and singing routines ahead of matches with Ronaldinho and Roberto Carlos. He also has a giant anteater named after him at London Zoo. Gilberto is an adoptee of the animal, which he received from a London Zoo competition winner. The footballer described the South American animal as "my slightly more hairy brother!"

During the 2014 FIFA World Cup in Brazil, he served as a studio analyst for ESPN on ABC alongside former Dutch international Ruud van Nistelrooy. Gilberto later worked on an expert panel during BBC's coverage of the 2022 FIFA World Cup in Qatar, he featured alongside Jürgen Klinsmann, Vincent Kompany, Didier Drogba, Laura Georges, Pablo Zabaleta and Mark Schwarzer.

In May 2016, Gilberto joined Panathinaikos as technical director; he left in December, after seven months in the role. Gilberto serves as an ambassador for both Arsenal and FIFA, he was also named the 23rd FIFA Master class patron by the International Centre for Sports Studies in 2023 for his contribution to football.

== Career statistics ==
=== Club ===
Appearances and goals by club, season and competition
Club	Season	League			State league (Note: Includes Campeonato Mineiro, Campeonato Gaúcho)		National cup (Note: Includes Copa do Brasil, FA Cup, Greek Football Cup)		League cup (Note: Includes Football League Cup)		Continental		Other		Total	
Club	Season	Division	Apps	Goals	Apps	Goals	Apps	Goals	Apps	Goals	Apps	Goals	Apps	Goals	Apps	Goals
América Mineiro	1997	Série B	8	0	3	0	0	0	—		—		—		11	0
América Mineiro	1998	Série A	20	1	1	0	2	0	—		—		—		23	1
América Mineiro	1999	Série B	—		17	1	3	0	—		—		6 (Note: Appearances in Copa Centro-Oeste)	1	26	2
América Mineiro	Total		28	1	21	1	5	0	—		—		6	1	60	3
Atlético Mineiro	2000	Série A	3	0	11	1	6	0	—		8 (Note: Seven appearances in Copa Libertadores, one appearance in Copa Mercosur)	0	6 (Note: Appearances in Copa Sul-Minas)	0	34	1
Atlético Mineiro	2001	Série A	26	3	4	2	0	0	—		—		2	0	32	5
Atlético Mineiro	2002	Série A	0	0	0	0	6	0	—		—		15	2	21	2
Atlético Mineiro	Total		29	3	15	3	12	0	—		8	0	23	2	87	8
Arsenal	2002–03	Premier League	35	0	—		3	0	0	0	12 (Note: Appearance(s) in UEFA Champions League)	2	1 (Note: Appearance in FA Community Shield)	1	51	3
Arsenal	2003–04	Premier League	32	4	—		3	0	1	0	8	0	1	0	45	4
Arsenal	2004–05	Premier League	13	0	—		2	0	0	0	1	0	1	1	17	1
Arsenal	2005–06	Premier League	33	2	—		1	0	3	1	10	1	1	0	48	4
Arsenal	2006–07	Premier League	34	10	—		3	0	1	0	9	1	—		47	11
Arsenal	2007–08	Premier League	23	1	—		3	0	3	0	7	0	—		36	1
Arsenal	Total		170	17	—		15	0	8	1	47	4	4	2	244	24
Panathinaikos	2008–09	Super League Greece	29	3	—		2	0	—		11	0	—		42	3
Panathinaikos	2009–10	Super League Greece	24	0	—		3	0	—		13 (Note: Four appearances in UEFA Champions League, nine appearances in UEFA Europa League)	0	—		40	0
Panathinaikos	2010–11	Super League Greece	30	2	—		2	1	—		5	0	—		37	3
Panathinaikos	Total		83	5	—		7	1	—		29	0	—		119	6
Grêmio	2011	Série A	21	1	0	0	0	0	—		0	0	—		21	1
Grêmio	2012	Série A	26	0	15	1	8	0	—		4 (Note: Appearances in Copa Sudamericana)	0	—		53	1
Grêmio	Total		47	1	15	1	8	0	—		4	0	—		74	2
Atlético Mineiro	2013	Série A	9	0	11	1	0	0	—		7 (Note: Appearances in Copa Libertadores)	0	—		27	1
Career total			366	27	62	6	47	1	8	1	95	4	33	5	611	44

=== International ===
Appearances and goals by national team and year
National team	Year	Apps	Goals
Brazil	2001	1	0
Brazil	2002	15	3
Brazil	2003	8	0
Brazil	2004	4 (Note: Does not include match against Haiti on 18 August 2004, as it was not recognised by FIFA as an 'A international')	0
Brazil	2005	4 (Note: Does not include match against United Arab Emirates on 12 November 2005, as it was not recognised by FIFA as an 'A international')	0
Brazil	2006	9	0
Brazil	2007	15	0
Brazil	2008	9	0
Brazil	2009	16	0
Brazil	2010	8	0
Total		89	3

Scores and results list Brazil's goal tally first, score column indicates score after each Silva goal.

List of international goals scored by Gilberto Silva
No.	Cap	Date	Venue	Opponent	Score	Result	Competition
1	2	31 January 2002	Estádio Serra Dourada, Goiânia, Brazil	Bolivia	2–0	6–0	Friendly
2	2	31 January 2002	Estádio Serra Dourada, Goiânia, Brazil	Bolivia	3–0	6–0	Friendly
3	4	7 March 2002	Estádio Governador José Fragelli, Cuiabá, Brazil	Iceland	4–0	6–1	Friendly

== Honours ==
América Mineiro

- Série B: 1997

Atlético Mineiro

- Campeonato Mineiro: 2000, 2013
- Copa Libertadores: 2013

Arsenal

- Premier League: 2003–04
- FA Cup: 2002–03, 2004–05
- FA Community Shield: 2002, 2004

Panathinaikos

- Super League Greece: 2009–10
- Greek Football Cup: 2009–10

Brazil

- FIFA World Cup: 2002
- Copa América: 2007
- FIFA Confederations Cup: 2005, 2009
