= Chris Wright (footballer) =

English footballer (born 1986)

Personal information
- Date of birth: 27 September 1986 (age 40)
- Place of birth: Colchester, England
- Position: Goalkeeper

Team information
- Current team: Boston Town
- Number: 1

Senior career*
Years	Team	Apps	(Gls)
2004–2005	Arsenal	0	(0)
2005–2006	Boston United	1	(0)
2006–2007	Bishop's Stortford	17	(0)
2007–2008	Boston United	10	(0)
2008	Sleaford Town		
2008–2009	Corby Town		
2009	Boston United		
2009–2011	Stamford		
2011–	Boston Town		
- * Club domestic league appearances and goals as of 16:28, 19 June 2008

Chris Wright (born 27 September 1986) is an English footballer. He is a goalkeeper and currently plays for Boston Town.

== Career ==
=== Arsenal ===
Initially a member of the youth program at Arsenal, his first call-up was in a League Cup quarter-final against Manchester United, for which he was named as one of the substitutes, but didn't play during the match. Wright was released by Arsenal in the summer of 2005.

=== Later career ===
Wright was signed by Boston on a free transfer. He spent a season with the Pilgrims, making a solitary league appearance against Bristol Rovers on 15 October 2005 when regular custodian Nathan Abbey was suspended. Wright was released by Boston at the end of the 2005–06 season and joined Bishop's Stortford. He rejoined Boston in July 2007 but left in December of the same year. Wright went on to join a number of non league teams most recently Sleaford Town and Corby Town, whilst playing football. Wright joined Pygott & Crone as a financial advisor. In October 2008, Wright left Boston United, with personal reasons being cited for his release. Following the end of traveling in Australia, Wright opted to re-sign for Boston for a third spell on 3 February 2009, signing for new manager Steve Welsh. He was released at the end of the 2008–09 season and joined local rivals Stamford. In July 2011 he joined former Boston United player Shane Clancy at Boston Town.

== Personal life ==
Chris went to Cann Hall primary school in his hometown of Clacton On Sea, He then went on to study at Colbayns high school. Wright is presently a P.E. teacher and Head of Year at The Thomas Cowley High School in Donington.
