= 2002 FA Community Shield =

- The match programme cover
Arsenal	Liverpool
1	0
- Date: 11 August 2002
- Venue: Millennium Stadium, Cardiff
- Man of the Match: Martin Keown (Arsenal)
- Referee: Alan Wiley (Staffordshire)
- Attendance: 67,337
- Weather: Mostly cloudy Light rain showers 16 °C (61 °F)

The 2002 FA Community Shield (also known as The FA Community Shield in partnership with McDonald's for sponsorship reasons) was the 80th FA Community Shield, an annual English football match played between the winners of the previous season's Premier League and FA Cup. It was the first edition since the competition's rename from the FA Charity Shield. The match was contested by Arsenal, who won a league and FA Cup double the previous season, and Liverpool, who finished runners-up in the league. It was held at Cardiff's Millennium Stadium, on 11 August 2002. Arsenal won the match by one goal to nil, watched by a crowd of 67,337.

This was Arsenal's 16th Shield appearance and Liverpool's 20th. Arsenal were without several of their first choice players in midfield, who were absent through injury; this prompted a shuffle in the team which saw striker Sylvain Wiltord positioned on the left wing. For Liverpool, defender Markus Babbel was named as a substitute after a lengthy period out of the side through illness. New signing El Hadji Diouf started in a creative role, behind strikers Michael Owen and Emile Heskey to begin with.

The only goal of the match came in the second half; Arsenal substitute Gilberto Silva on his debut collected a pass from Dennis Bergkamp and struck the ball through goalkeeper Jerzy Dudek's legs. Arsenal manager Arsène Wenger praised the match-winner in his post-match interview, while opposing manager Gérard Houllier felt the result showed that his team needed more game time and attention to passing, in order to improve. The result meant Arsenal was the first team to win the Shield outright 11 times, while it marked Liverpool's first defeat at the Millennium Stadium.

== Background ==
Founded in 1908 as a successor to the Sheriff of London Charity Shield, the FA Charity Shield began as a contest between the respective champions of the Football League and Southern League, although in 1913, it was played between an Amateurs XI and a Professionals XI. In 1921, it was played by the league champions of the top division and FA Cup winners for the first time. (Note: The Premier League replaced the Football League First Division at the top of the English football pyramid after its inception in 1992.) Wembley Stadium acted as the host of the Shield from 1974. Cardiff's Millennium Stadium was hosting the Shield for the second time; it took over as the venue for the event while Wembley Stadium underwent a six-year renovation between 2001 and 2006.

In February 2002, the trophy was renamed the FA Community Shield. The then-FA marketing director Paul Barber noted this was in order to reward the work of those contributing to the game, who go unnoticed: "The most important thing is that the many good causes that have benefited from the shield in the past will continue to benefit from the Community Shield in the future." The FA also intended to prevent any interference made by the Charity Commission into where money raised by the game should go. In April 2002, McDonald's was announced as the main sponsor of the Community Shield, in a four-year, £28 million contract. The deal included the company making an "invest[ment] in 8,000 new community-based coaches for young players".

Arsenal qualified for the 2002 FA Community Shield as the holders of the FA Cup, beating Chelsea 2–0 in the 2002 FA Cup final. The team later won the 2001–02 FA Premier League and completed the domestic double. The other Community Shield place went to league runners-up Liverpool, who secured second place on the final day of the season. The game marked Arsenal's 16th Charity Shield appearance and first since 1999, where they beat Manchester United by two goals to one. By contrast this was Liverpool's 20th, who incidentally played United and won by exactly the same scoreline to become holders of the trophy. The last meeting between the two teams was in the FA Cup; a goal by Dennis Bergkamp ensured Arsenal progressed into the fifth round of the competition. This was the first edition of the Shield to not feature United since 1995.

== Pre-match ==
In spite of the game's traditional friendly feel, Liverpool manager Gérard Houllier highlighted in pre-match press conference the importance of winning the Shield: "It is very important to me. This match is more than a friendly. It represents the start of the season. The Community Shield is like a final. There is a trophy at stake and we are the holders." Arsène Wenger wanted to use the match as "the final preparation game for the championship" and commented that Liverpool, amongst four other teams (Manchester United, Newcastle United, Chelsea and Leeds United) would challenge Arsenal in the league.

== Match ==
Arsenal were without injured trio Robert Pires, Freddie Ljungberg and Giovanni van Bronckhorst and lined up in their traditional 4–4–2 formation; striker Sylvain Wiltord was accommodated to the left wing, with Bergkamp playing off main striker Thierry Henry. After a lengthy illness, Liverpool defender Markus Babbel returned to the squad and was named as a substitute. Houllier deployed a 4–3–1–2 formation with Steven Gerrard, John Arne Riise and Dietmar Hamann as a midfield three and new signing, El Hadji Diouf positioned in a free role to begin with and as the game went on, moved to the right wing to stretch Arsenal's defence.

=== Summary ===
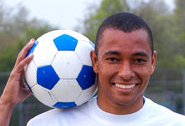
Arsenal midfielder Gilberto Silva scored the only goal of the game, on his debut.

Arsenal won the toss and kicked off. Within the first three minutes they fashioned their first opening: Wiltord found space outside the Liverpool box, yet failed to give the ball to Henry, as the through ball was cleared. Gerrard was booked for a tackle on Vieira in the sixth minute, which left the Frenchman seeking medical attention and moments after, he caught Henry late with a similar lunge; Gerrard was given the benefit of the doubt by the referee. Bergkamp volleyed the ball "from close range" which was blocked by defender Abel Xavier and two of his efforts were saved in quick succession by Jerzy Dudek after the 20-minute mark. Liverpool managed their first shot on target before the half-hour: a shot from Emile Heskey which hit goalkeeper David Seaman's chest. After a quiet period towards the end of the first half, Ray Parlour went close to giving Arsenal the lead, through a long-range shot that missed the post by fractions. A move from Arsenal soon after concluded with Wiltord firing the ball straight at Dudek, having been under pressure by Djimi Traoré.

Midfielder Gilberto Silva made his debut in the second half, coming on in place of fellow Brazilian Edu. In the 47th minute, Henry went close to scoring his first goal at the Millennium Stadium; he collected a pass from Bergkamp and used his pace to get past the Liverpool defence. His shot caught Dudek and rebounded off the post. Henry created further chances in the 51st and 54th minutes, forcing more saves from the Liverpool goalkeeper. Owen was unable to reach the ball from a corner and Liverpool continued to pressure Arsenal, with Gerrard regaining control of the midfield and making a substitution which saw Danny Murphy come on for Hamann. In spite of this, it was Arsenal who scored the opening goal, in the 68th minute. A move by Liverpool, which had broken down, allowed Gilberto to pass the ball out to Ashley Cole, who in turn fed Bergkamp. His cut-back met the Brazilian's left foot "with a shot that squeezed through Dudek's legs." Diouf went down in the penalty box four minutes after, which provoked a reaction by Vieira, who believed he had dived. Both managers made numerous changes in the final 15 minutes, which included Milan Baroš replacing Heskey and midfielder Kolo Touré on for Bergkamp. The final notable chance went to Liverpool a minute before additional time: Sol Campbell was caught out of position in Arsenal's half, but Diouf's shot went over the goal bar.

=== Details ===
11 August 2002
14:00 BST

Arsenal	1–0	Liverpool
Gilberto 69'	Report

Millennium Stadium, Cardiff
Attendance: 67,337
Referee: Alan Wiley (Staffordshire)

Arsenal	Liverpool

GK	1	(England) David Seaman
RB	12	(Cameroon) Lauren
CB	5	(England) Martin Keown
CB	23	(England) Sol Campbell
LB	3	(England) Ashley Cole
RM	15	(England) Ray Parlour
CM	4	(France) Patrick Vieira (c)
CM	17	(Brazil) Edu		(substituted off) 45'
LM	11	(France) Sylvain Wiltord	(yellow card) 24'
CF	10	(Netherlands) Dennis Bergkamp		(substituted off) 85'
CF	14	(France) Thierry Henry	(yellow card) 44'
Substitutes:
GK	13	(England) Stuart Taylor
DF	18	(France) Pascal Cygan
DF	20	(England) Matthew Upson
DF	22	(Ukraine) Oleh Luzhnyi
MF	28	(Ivory Coast) Kolo Touré		(substituted on) 85'
MF	19	(Brazil) Gilberto Silva		(substituted on) 45'
FW	30	(France) Jérémie Aliadière
Manager:
(France) Arsène Wenger

GK	1	(Poland) Jerzy Dudek
RB	3	(Portugal) Abel Xavier		(substituted off) 78'
CB	2	(Switzerland) Stéphane Henchoz
CB	4	(Finland) Sami Hyypiä (c)
LB	30	(Mali) Djimi Traoré		(substituted off) 88'
RM	17	(England) Steven Gerrard	(yellow card) 6'
CM	16	(Germany) Dietmar Hamann		(substituted off) 67'
LM	18	(Norway) John Arne Riise
AM	9	(Senegal) El Hadji Diouf
CF	10	(England) Michael Owen		(substituted off) 85'
CF	8	(England) Emile Heskey		(substituted off) 74'
Substitutes:
GK	22	(England) Chris Kirkland
DF	6	(Germany) Markus Babbel		(substituted on) 78'
DF	23	(England) Jamie Carragher
MF	28	(France) Bruno Cheyrou		(substituted on) 88'
MF	7	(Czech Republic) Vladimír Šmicer		(substituted on) 85'
MF	13	(England) Danny Murphy		(substituted on) 67'	(yellow card) 82'
FW	5	(Czech Republic) Milan Baroš		(substituted on) 74'
Manager:
(France) Gérard Houllier

Man of the match

- Martin Keown (Arsenal)

Match officials

- Assistant referees:
  - Nigel Miller (Durham)
  - Trevor Kettle (Royal Air Force)
- Fourth official: Rob Styles (Hampshire)

Match rules

- 90 minutes
- Penalty shoot-out if scores level after 90 minutes
- Seven named substitutes, of which up to six may be used

=== Statistics ===
Statistic	Arsenal	Liverpool
Goals scored	1	0
Possession	56%	44%
Shots on target	9	1
Shots off target	3	6
Corner kicks	5	7
Offsides	3	1
Yellow cards	4	2
Red cards	0	0

== Post-match ==
He's an intelligent boy, makes things simple and gets into the box at the right time.

— Arsène Wenger on Gilberto Silva

The result marked the first time that Liverpool had lost at the Millennium Stadium. Wenger used his post-match news interview to praise goalscorer Gilberto Silva and asserted that the Brazilian would be a "very strong player" for the team, in the incoming future. He noted that Dudek had "kept [Liverpool] in the game for a long time" and was critical of Gerrard, who he felt was fortunate not to have been sent off for a "reckless and dangerous" challenge on Vieira. Wenger believed Arsenal's experience put the team in good stead for the upcoming season: "There are two attitudes to being champions. One is to get respect, another is to get kicked more and to face more aggression as people want to beat you more. We are quite used to that though as we have had some big fights in the past four or five years."

Houllier argued that his team paid Arsenal "too much respect" in the match and blamed his full-backs Xavier and Traoré for not providing width, adding: "We need to have more flow in our game, more safety in our passing construction". Gerrard was unrepentant for tackling Vieira and stated he was trying to "stamp [his] authority" on the match. He accepted defeat and was optimistic Liverpool had the means to win the Premier League: "We'd rather they beat us in this game and then we go on to pick up the title. That's what we're really looking at. Even though they got the better of us yesterday, it doesn't mean they'll do better than us over the whole season." Diouf insisted he should have earned a penalty in the second half, given he felt there was "definite contact" from a challenge in the penalty box: "It was a penalty, definitely, but the referee is the master on the pitch and he didn't give it. I know the Arsenal players think I dived, but I didn't."

== See also ==
- 2002–03 FA Premier League
- 2002–03 FA Cup
