= Frank Simek =

American former soccer player (born 1984)

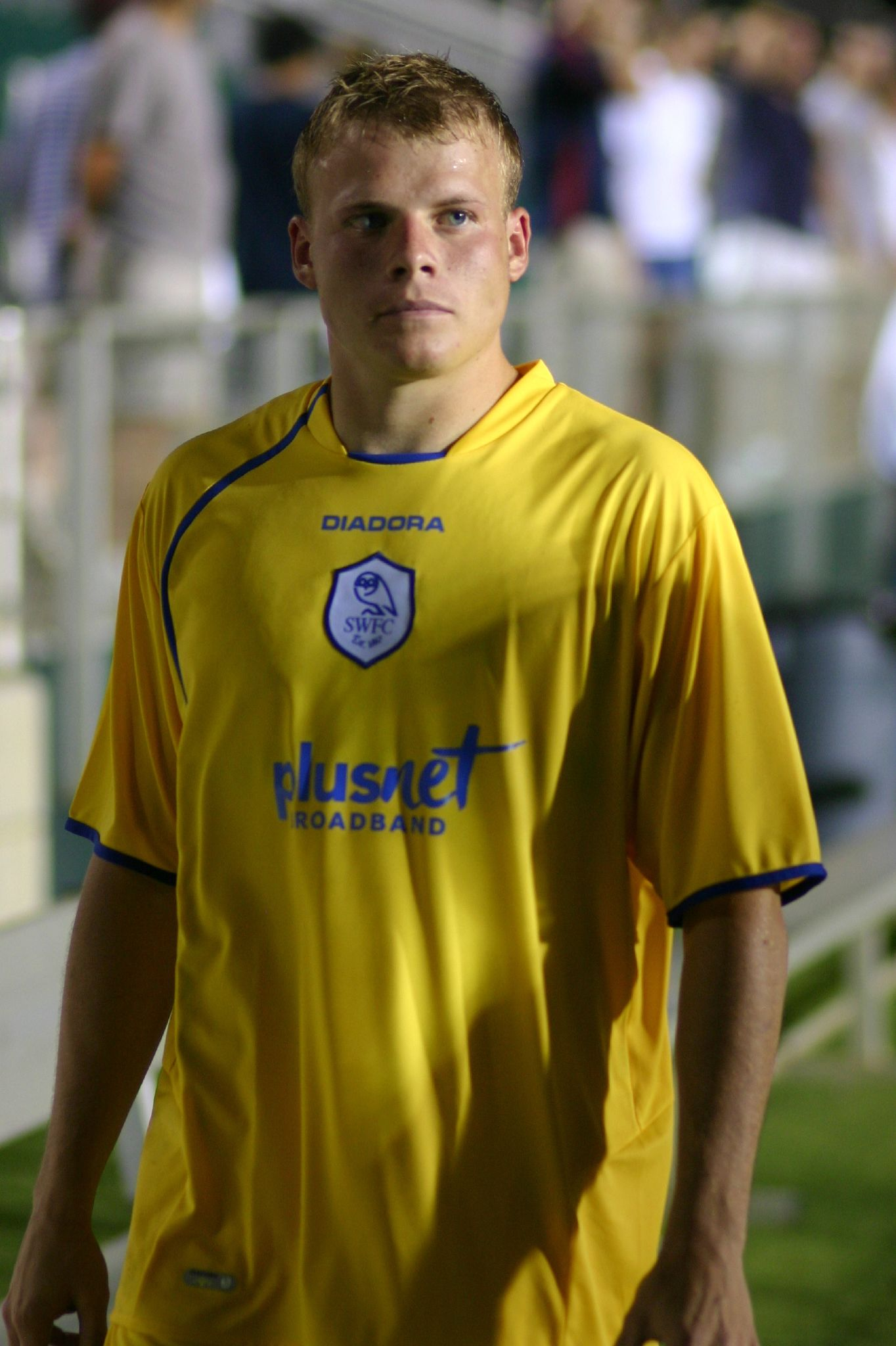

Personal information
- Full name: Franklin Michael Simek
- Date of birth: October 13, 1984 (age 42)
- Place of birth: St. Louis, Missouri, United States
- Height: 6 ft 0 in (1.83 m)
- Position: Defender

Youth career
- 1996–2003: Arsenal

Senior career*
Years	Team	Apps	(Gls)
2003–2005	Arsenal	0	(0)
2004	→ Queens Park Rangers (loan)	5	(0)
2005	→ AFC Bournemouth (loan)	8	(0)
2005–2010	Sheffield Wednesday	119	(2)
2010–2013	Carlisle United	109	(0)
Total		241	(2)

International career
2002–2003	United States U20	3	(1)
2007	United States	5	(0)
Medal record
Representing United States
Winner	CONCACAF Gold Cup	2007
Men's Soccer
- * Club domestic league appearances and goals

Franklin Michael Simek (born October 13, 1984) is an American former soccer player.

== Playing career ==
Born in St. Louis, Missouri, Simek played soccer as a child in the United States but did not think of the game as a career until his family moved to London after his father was assigned to a position at the English office of Anheuser-Busch when Frank was 12. He was signed by Arsenal to a development contract, but decided to move back to St. Louis, where he played at Saint Louis University High School, as well as Metro F.C., then under the direction of Dave Fernandez and Dale Schilly. However, during this time Arsenal called him back to play on the youth team.

While at Arsenal he rose to assume the captaincy of the reserve side, but had difficulty breaking into the first team; he found himself behind Lauren, Kolo Touré, Emmanuel Eboué and Justin Hoyte in the pecking order. He played a single match for Arsenal, in the League Cup against Wolverhampton Wanderers on December 2, 2003.

=== Sheffield Wednesday ===
Simek joined the Owls on a free transfer from Arsenal in the summer of 2005 and made his Sheffield Wednesday debut on the opening day of the 2005–06 season away at Stoke City. He went on to win a regular starting spot, ousting fan-favorite Lee Bullen from his preferred right-back position. Simek scored his first goal in his first season at Wednesday away at Millwall. The goal gave the Owls a 1–0 win and helped them in their battle against relegation. Simek then managed to get his first home goal against Colchester in the 2006–2007. Simek had managed to gain a regular first team place at Hillsborough became a crowd favorite for his tough tackling and powerful running.

Simek signed a new contract with Sheffield Wednesday on July 26, 2007.

Simek suffered a serious ankle injury playing against Crystal Palace in December 2007. The injury kept him out of the Wednesday first team for over ten months. He made a slow return with a number of reserve team appearances followed by an appearance on the substitutes bench against Birmingham City on October 25, 2008, and then finally a return to first team three days later when he came on as a substitute against Plymouth.

=== Carlisle United ===
Simek signed for Carlisle United on a 2-year contract and joined the squad on July 1, 2010. He was an ever-present part in the United team, apart from the start of the 2011–12 season in which he suffered an injury that left him out of action for 5 months. Replacements such as James Tavernier and Christian Ribeiro filled the right-back position in Simek's absence but upon his recovery he instantly earned his place in the Carlisle team yet again. In July 2012, Simek signed a new one-year deal with Carlisle United, keeping him at the club until the summer of 2013.

== Honors ==
Carlisle United

- Football League Trophy: 2010–11

United States

- CONCACAF Gold Cup: 2007
