= Kolo Touré =

Ivorian footballer (born 1981)

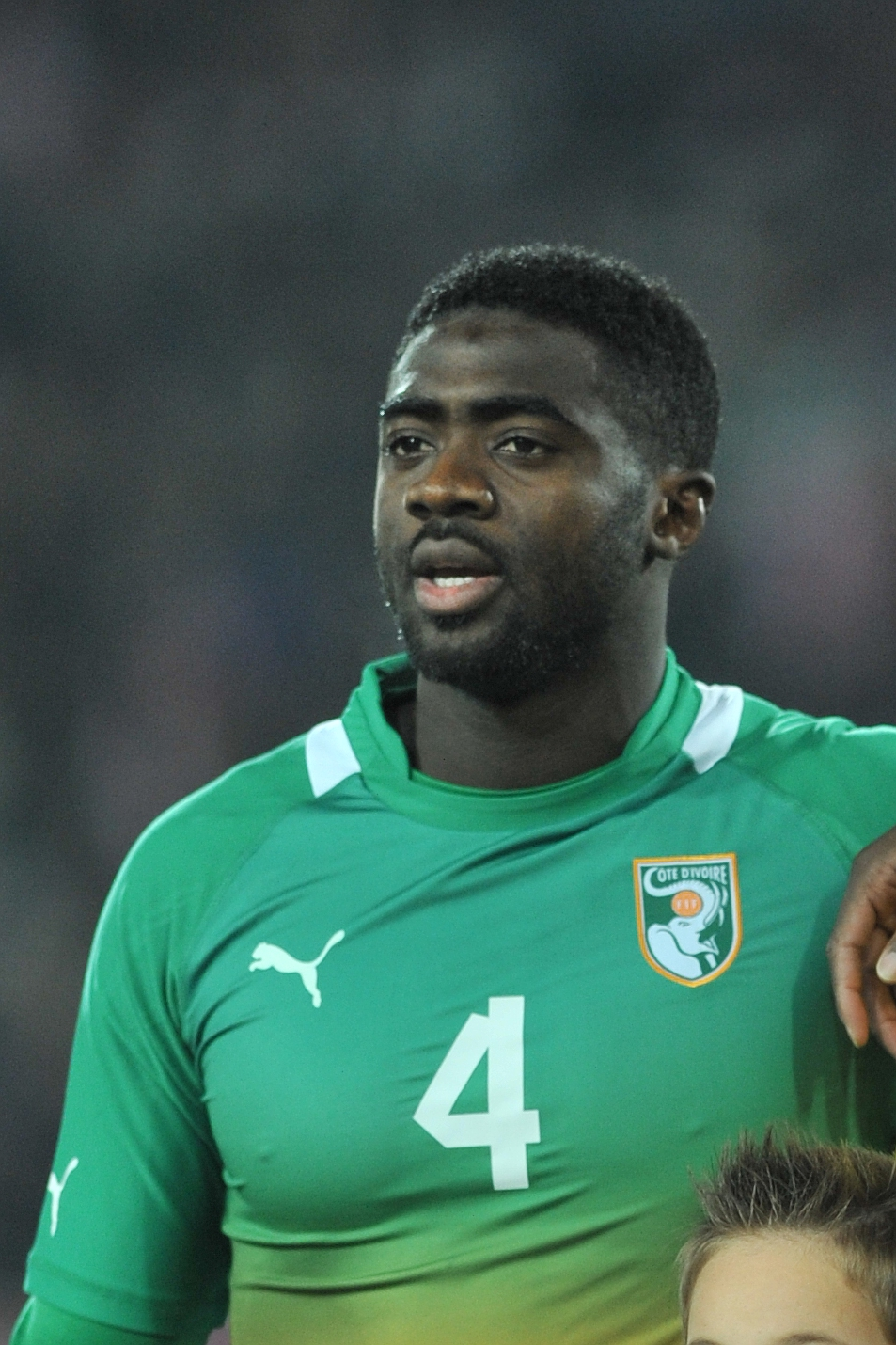
- Touré lining up for the Ivory Coast in 2012

Personal information
- Full name: Kolo Abib Touré
- Date of birth: 19 March 1981 (age 45)
- Place of birth: Bouaké, Ivory Coast
- Height: 1.78 m (5 ft 10 in)
- Position: Centre-back

Youth career
- –1999: ASEC Mimosas

Senior career*
Years	Team	Apps	(Gls)
1999–2002	ASEC Mimosas		
2002–2009	Arsenal	225	(9)
2009–2013	Manchester City	82	(2)
2013–2016	Liverpool	46	(1)
2016–2017	Celtic	9	(0)
Total		362	(12)

International career
2000–2015	Ivory Coast	120	(7)

Managerial career
- 2017: Ivory Coast U23
- 2022–2023: Wigan Athletic
Medal record
Men's football
Representing Ivory Coast
Africa Cup of Nations
Runner-up	2006 Egypt
Runner-up	2012 Equatorial Guinea–Gabon
Winner	2015 Equatorial Guinea
- * Club domestic league appearances and goals

Kolo Abib Touré (born 19 March 1981) is an Ivorian professional football manager and former player who was most recently the assistant manager of Premier League club Manchester City.

Beginning his career as a defender with ASEC Mimosas, Touré moved to English team Arsenal in 2002, where he made 326 appearances for the club and was a member of the 03–04 'invincibles' side. In 2009, he moved to Manchester City, where he was joined a year later by his younger brother, Yaya, helping City earn their first league title in 44 years. In 2013, Touré signed for Liverpool. He is one of the ten players who have won the Premier League with two clubs, having won it with Arsenal and City. He also won the Scottish Premiership and Scottish League Cup with Celtic. He remains to date the African player with the most Premier League appearances (353 in total).

Touré is the second-most capped player for the Ivory Coast, with 120 appearances from 2000 to 2015. He represented the team at the 2006, 2010 and 2014 FIFA World Cup tournaments. Touré also represented the Ivory Coast at seven Africa Cup of Nations tournaments between 2002 and 2015, helping them finish runner-up in 2006 and 2012, while winning in 2015.

== Early life and education ==
Touré was born in Bouaké, Ivory Coast. He is the older brother of Ibrahim Touré and Yaya Touré. Ibrahim died of cancer in 2014, aged 28. They also have a sister, Belinda.

In his early teens he was picked up by Abidjan club, ASEC Mimosas, who ran a disciplined and successful academy (originated by Jean-Marc Guillou).

== Club career ==
=== Arsenal ===
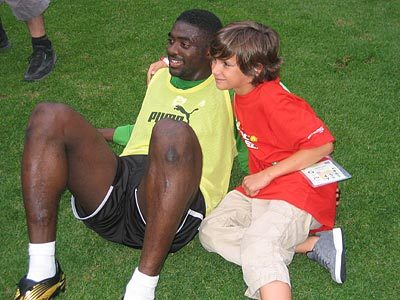
Touré with a young fan

Kolo Touré joined Premier League team Arsenal from ASEC Mimosas on a long-term contract for a fee of £150,000 on 14 February 2002 after a short trial. His status as a full international meant that he was able to secure a British work permit.

Touré made his debut for the first team on 11 August 2002, in the 1–0 win over Liverpool in the FA Community Shield, in which he played the final five minutes as a substitute for Dennis Bergkamp. Initially regarded as a utility player, he started his Arsenal career as a defensive midfielder as well as at right-back. He scored his first Arsenal goal at Stamford Bridge in a 1–1 draw against Chelsea on 1 September, having replaced the injured Edu after half an hour. Arsenal won the FA Cup, with Touré an unused substitute in the final against Southampton.

At the start of the 2003–04 season, Wenger began using Touré as a central defender alongside Sol Campbell. Touré inherited his position from veteran Martin Keown, whom he praised as a mentor; Arsenal won the league without losing a game that season.

Touré was in and out of the Arsenal team during the 2004–05 season, battling for a first team place with the likes of Philippe Senderos and Pascal Cygan to play alongside Campbell in defence. Touré ended the season with a FA Cup winners medal playing 50 times for Arsenal that season and scoring one goal. His only goal of the 2004–05 season came in the 90th minute of Arsenal's UEFA Champions League last 16 round tie against Bayern Munich of Germany. Arsenal lost the game 3–1.

Touré established himself as a permanent fixture in the Arsenal starting XI. In the 2005–06 season, he established a formidable defensive partnership with Senderos. Both centre-backs helped the Arsenal team reach the 2006 UEFA Champions League Final after keeping 10 consecutive clean sheets, making it a European competition record.

Touré scored his second European goal on 19 April 2006, the winner in the first leg of the Champions League semi-final against Villarreal CF. It was the final European goal scored at Highbury and the goal that effectively decided the tie (Arsenal won 1–0 on aggregate), to send Arsenal through to their first ever Champions League Final, in Paris, France, which they would end up losing late on.

In October 2006, Touré signed a new contract of undisclosed "long-term" length. The following 9 January, he captained the club for the first time in the absence of Gilberto Silva and Thierry Henry, in a 6–3 victory away to Liverpool in the quarter-finals of the League Cup. He led Arsenal out for the final against Chelsea on 25 February, which his team lost 2–1. His challenge on Mikel John Obi caused a mass brawl which led to both players and Arsenal's Emmanuel Adebayor being sent off, as well as a £100,000 fine for both London rival clubs.

On 13 April 2009, Touré demanded a move away from Arsenal after a reputed bust-up with defensive partner William Gallas. He reportedly handed in a transfer request which was later turned down by Arsenal chairman Peter Hill-Wood. However, Touré temporarily reversed his decision and committed to the Gunners at least until the summer.

=== Manchester City ===
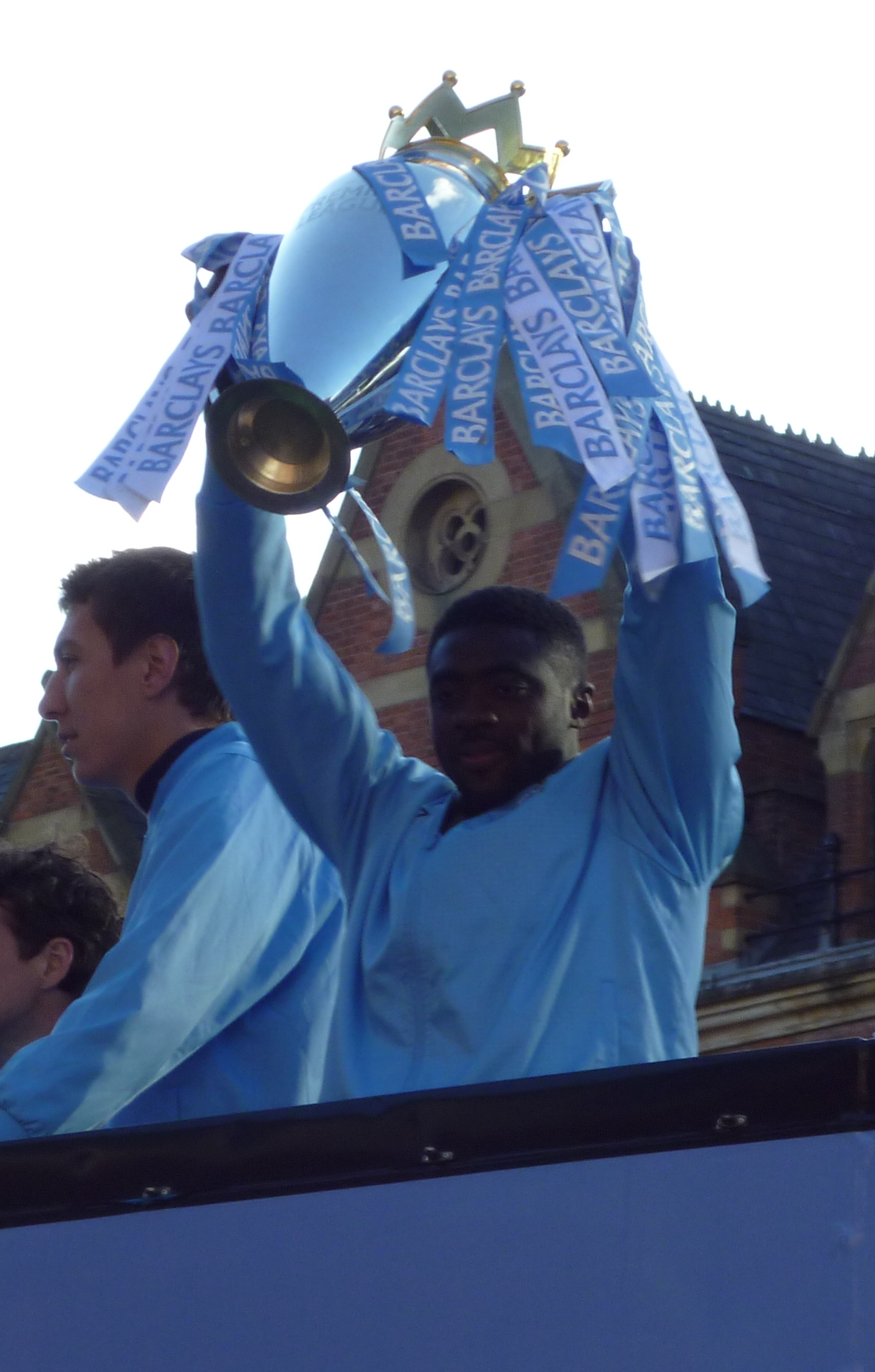
Touré celebrating Manchester City's Premier League triumph in 2012

After much transfer speculation, it was announced on 28 July 2009 that Manchester City had agreed a fee of £14 million for Touré. After he successfully passed a medical in Manchester on 29 July 2009, Touré signed a four-year contract with the club which had the option of extending it to five years. City, who had finished 10th the previous season, had made a number of high-profile signings in preparation for the 2009–10 season, and Touré expressed that hoped to help make City a top four team. He was appointed the club captain by Mark Hughes. He scored his first goal for Manchester City in a 2–1 League Cup win over Fulham on 23 September 2009. He scored his first league goal for City against Burnley on 7 November 2009. Manchester City finished the season in fifth position, losing out to Tottenham Hotspur by just three points. On 2 July 2010, Kolo Touré was joined by his brother Yaya at Manchester City following a transfer believed to be worth around £24 million.

At the beginning of the 2010–11 season, Roberto Mancini took away the captain's armband from Touré and gave it to Carlos Tevez. However, he remained part of Mancini's plans and was a first team regular in defence. He was sent off in Manchester City's 2–1 defeat to Everton on 20 December 2010, helping to deny City the chance to top the Premier League table on Christmas. On 15 January 2011, Touré scored the first goal in a 4–3 win for the Citizens against Wolves which sent them to the top of the league table.

On 3 March 2011, it was revealed that Touré had failed a drug test and had been suspended. The World Anti-Doping Agency imposed a 6-month suspension from football effective 2 March 2011.

In the 2011–12 season, Touré, unlike his brother, who was starting every match possible, was used as a squad player, making 14 league appearances as Manchester City won a league title for the first time in 44 years.

=== Liverpool ===
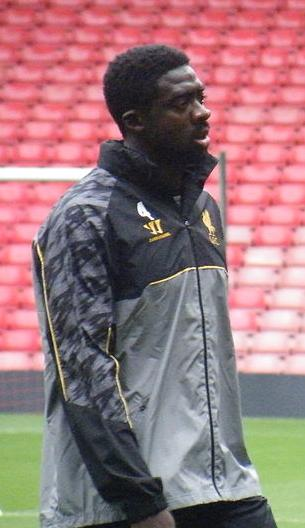
Touré with Liverpool in 2013

On 28 May 2013, Liverpool announced that an agreement had been reached in principle to sign Touré on a free transfer from Manchester City. On 2 July he was unveiled as Liverpool's first signing of the window and was handed the number 4 shirt. He signed a two-year contract. He made his Premier League debut for Liverpool on 17 August 2013 in a 1–0 victory over Stoke City at Anfield. On 2 February 2014, in a match against West Bromwich Albion he passed straight to opponent Victor Anichebe, who scored an equaliser. Twelve days later, he scored an own-goal in a match against Fulham, which eventually Liverpool won thanks to a late penalty from skipper Steven Gerrard. Liverpool were in contention to win the league title in 2013–14, which eventually went to Manchester City; had he won, Touré would have been the first player in English football since World War II to win the league with three clubs.

On 1 March 2015, he came on as an 83rd-minute substitute against Manchester City, marking the first time he and his brother Yaya, who started the match for City, faced each other in a competitive match. Liverpool won the match 2–1.

Touré scored his first Liverpool goal on 14 February 2016, heading in Jordan Henderson's corner kick to confirm a 6–0 win away to bottom side Aston Villa. It was his first goal in any match since January 2011, and he celebrated wildly. At the end of the 2015–16 season, Touré was released.

=== Celtic ===
On 24 July 2016, Touré reunited with former manager Brendan Rodgers when he joined Celtic on a one-year contract. He made his debut on 3 August 2016, coming on as a substitute in the second half of Celtic's 2–1 win over FC Astana in a Champions League qualifier. He made 20 appearances as Celtic completed an unbeaten domestic season, winning a treble of League, Cup and League Cup. Touré was not offered a new playing contract at the end of the season.

In September 2017, Touré announced his retirement and took up a coaching role with Celtic.

== International career ==
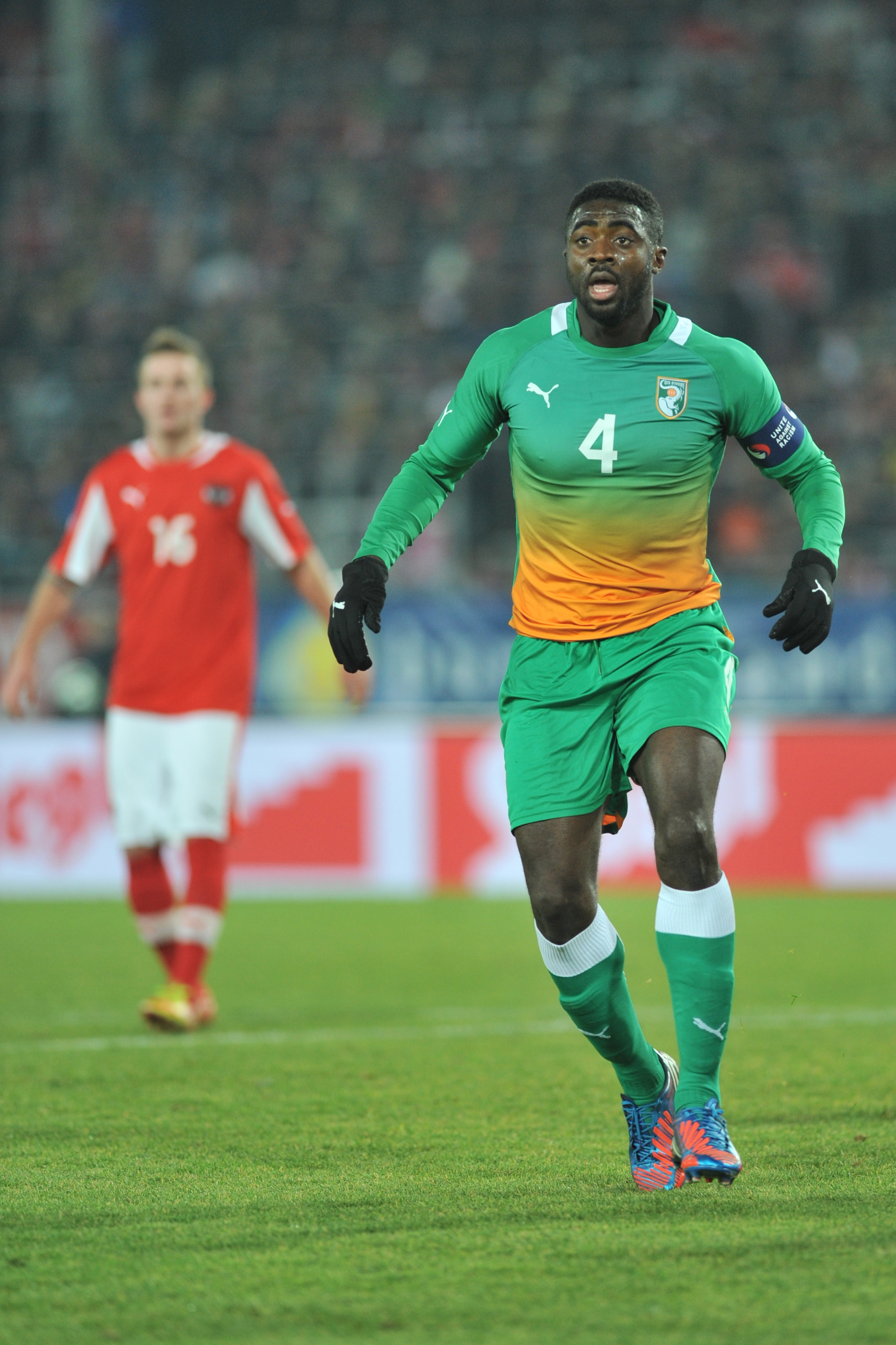
Touré playing for Ivory Coast in 2012

Touré made his international debut for Ivory Coast against Rwanda in April 2000. He became a regular member of the national team and represented Ivory Coast at the 2006 Africa Cup of Nations in Egypt. He played in five matches during the tournament, including the final against the hosts. The match ended goalless after extra time, and although Touré converted his penalty in the shoot-out, Ivory Coast lost 4–2.

Touré was selected by manager Henri Michel for the 2006 FIFA World Cup, Ivory Coast's first appearance in the competition. He made his World Cup debut against Argentina on 10 June 2006 in a 2–1 defeat and also played against the Netherlands as Ivory Coast were eliminated in the group stage.

At the 2010 FIFA World Cup in South Africa, Touré captained Ivory Coast in their opening group match against Portugal, with regular captain Didier Drogba initially on the substitutes' bench following an arm injury. The match ended in a goalless draw. On 10 August 2010, Touré scored the only goal in a 1–0 friendly victory over Italy at London's Boleyn Ground.

Touré reached a second continental final at the 2012 Africa Cup of Nations. Ivory Coast advanced to the final without conceding a goal but were defeated by Zambia following a goalless draw and an 8–7 penalty shoot-out. Touré was among the Ivorian players who missed a penalty during the shoot-out.

In October 2013, Touré was recalled to the national squad for a World Cup qualifying play-off against Senegal after several months away from international football. He explained that his limited playing time towards the end of his Manchester City career had influenced his decision to postpone his international return until he had regained match fitness.

He was included in Ivory Coast's squad for the 2014 FIFA World Cup in Brazil, his third World Cup. Touré started the final group match against Greece on 24 June 2014, which Ivory Coast lost 2–1 following a stoppage-time penalty, resulting in their elimination from the tournament.

In December 2014, Touré announced his intention to retire from international football after the 2015 Africa Cup of Nations. He played in all six of Ivory Coast's matches during the tournament, including the final against Ghana on 8 February 2015. The match finished goalless after extra time, and Touré converted Ivory Coast's seventh penalty in a shoot-out which they won 9–8, securing their first African title since 1992. Touré formally announced his international retirement on 15 February 2015, ending a 15-year international career in which he earned 120 caps.

== Coaching career ==
On 9 August 2017, the Ivorian Football Federation appointed Touré as a new member of their coaching staff for the African Nations Championship and under-23 team. He joined Celtic's coaching staff as a technical assistant in September 2017. In February 2019, Brendan Rodgers left Celtic for Leicester City, and Touré also joined Leicester as a first team coach.

=== Wigan Athletic ===
On 29 November 2022, Wigan Athletic appointed Touré as first team manager on a three-and-a-half-year deal. On 2 January 2023, Touré's team lost their third consecutive game by the scoreline of 4–1, and dropped to last place in the Championship as a result. Toure was sacked by Wigan on 26 January 2023, with the club bottom of the Championship and failing to win any of his nine games in charge.

=== Manchester City ===
In July 2024, Touré returned to Manchester City as an academy coach, initially working as an assistant with the club's under-16 team. He subsequently worked with the under-18 squad during the 2024–25 season, when the team won the Under-18 Premier League North title.

During the 2025 FIFA Club World Cup, Touré joined Pep Guardiola's first-team coaching staff in an assistant role. On 15 July 2025, Manchester City confirmed his permanent appointment to the senior coaching team.

On 26 May 2026, Manchester City announced that Touré would leave the club following the conclusion of the 2025–26 season. His departure formed part of a wider restructuring of the coaching staff following Guardiola's exit, with four other backroom staff members also departing.

== Personal life ==
Touré is a Muslim and observes fasting during the Islamic month of Ramadan, stating that "It doesn't affect me physically. It makes me stronger. You can do it when you believe so strongly in something. A normal human can be without water for much longer than one day."

Touré is married to Awo. As of 2011, they had a son and a daughter. His son, Yassine, is also pursuing a football career, having signed a two-year scholarship with Leicester City in December 2021.

== Career statistics ==
=== Club ===
Appearances and goals by club, season and competition
Club	Season	League			National cup (Note: Includes FA Cup, Scottish Cup)		League cup (Note: Includes League Cup, Scottish League Cup)		Europe		Other		Total	
Club	Season	Division	Apps	Goals	Apps	Goals	Apps	Goals	Apps	Goals	Apps	Goals	Apps	Goals
Arsenal	2001–02	Premier League	0	0	0	0	0	0	0	0	—		0	0
Arsenal	2002–03	Premier League	26	2	5	0	1	0	7 (Note: Appearances in the UEFA Champions League)	0	1 (Note: Appearance in FA Community Shield)	0	40	2
Arsenal	2003–04	Premier League	37	1	5	2	2	0	10	0	1	0	55	3
Arsenal	2004–05	Premier League	35	0	6	0	0	0	8	1	1	0	50	1
Arsenal	2005–06	Premier League	33	0	0	0	0	0	12	1	1	0	46	1
Arsenal	2006–07	Premier League	35	3	4	1	4	0	10	0	—		53	4
Arsenal	2007–08	Premier League	30	2	2	0	0	0	9	0	—		41	2
Arsenal	2008–09	Premier League	29	1	3	0	0	0	9	0	—		41	1
Arsenal	Total		225	9	25	3	7	0	65	2	4	0	326	14
Manchester City	2009–10	Premier League	31	1	1	0	3	1	—		—		35	2
Manchester City	2010–11	Premier League	22	1	2	0	0	0	5 (Note: Appearances in UEFA Europa League)	0	—		29	1
Manchester City	2011–12	Premier League	14	0	0	0	3	0	3 (Note: One appearance in UEFA Champions League, two in UEFA Europa League)	0	—		20	0
Manchester City	2012–13	Premier League	15	0	2	0	1	0	—		0	0	18	0
Manchester City	Total		82	2	5	0	7	1	8	0	0	0	102	3
Liverpool	2013–14	Premier League	20	0	2	0	2	0	—		—		24	0
Liverpool	2014–15	Premier League	12	0	3	0	3	0	3 (Note: Two appearances in UEFA Champions League, one in UEFA Europa League)	0	—		21	0
Liverpool	2015–16	Premier League	14	1	0	0	4	0	8	0	—		26	1
Liverpool	Total		46	1	5	0	9	0	11	0	0	0	71	1
Celtic	2016–17	Scottish Premiership	9	0	1	0	1	0	6	0	—		17	0
Career total			362	12	36	3	24	1	90	2	4	0	516	18

=== International ===
Appearances and goals by national team and year
National team	Year	Apps	Goals
Ivory Coast	2000	1	0
Ivory Coast	2001	10	0
Ivory Coast	2002	5	0
Ivory Coast	2003	4	0
Ivory Coast	2004	7	1
Ivory Coast	2005	9	0
Ivory Coast	2006	12	1
Ivory Coast	2007	8	0
Ivory Coast	2008	11	0
Ivory Coast	2009	6	0
Ivory Coast	2010	13	2
Ivory Coast	2011	3	1
Ivory Coast	2012	14	1
Ivory Coast	2013	5	0
Ivory Coast	2014	5	1
Ivory Coast	2015	8	0
Total		120	7

Scores and results list Ivory Coast's goal tally first, score column indicates score after each Touré goal.

List of international goals scored by Kolo Touré
No.	Date	Venue	Cap	Opponent	Score	Result	Competition
1	28 April 2004	Stade de Aix-les-Bains, Aix-les-Bains, France	21	Guinea	2–1	4–2	Friendly
2	8 October 2006	Stade Félix Houphouët-Boigny, Abidjan, Ivory Coast	47	Gabon	3–0	5–0	2008 Africa Cup of Nations qualification
3	4 June 2010	Stade Tourbillon, Sion, Switzerland	80	Japan	2–0	2–0	Friendly
4	10 August 2010	Upton Park, London, England	84	Italy	1–0	1–0	Friendly
5	9 October 2011	Stade Félix Houphouët-Boigny, Abidjan, Ivory Coast	88	Burundi	1–0	2–1	2012 Africa Cup of Nations qualification
6	9 June 2012	Stade de Marrakech, Marrakech, Morocco	99	Morocco	2–1	2–2	2014 FIFA World Cup qualification
7	14 November 2014	Stade Félix Houphouët-Boigny, Abidjan, Ivory Coast	112	Sierra Leone	1–0	5–1	2015 Africa Cup of Nations qualification

== Managerial statistics ==
As of 26 January 2023

Managerial record by team and tenure
Team	From	To	Record				
Team	From	To	P	W	D	L	Win %
Wigan Athletic	29 November 2022	26 January 2023	9	0	3	6	0.0
Total			9	0	3	6	0.0

== Honours ==
=== Player ===
Arsenal

- Premier League: 2003–04
- FA Cup: 2002–03, 2004–05
- FA Community Shield: 2002, 2004
- Football League Cup runner-up: 2006–07
- UEFA Champions League runner-up: 2005–06

Manchester City

- Premier League: 2011–12
- FA Community Shield: 2012

Liverpool

- Football League Cup runner-up: 2015–16
- UEFA Europa League runner-up: 2015–16

Celtic

- Scottish Premiership: 2016–17
- Scottish League Cup: 2016–17

Ivory Coast

- Africa Cup of Nations: 2015

Individual

- Ballon d'Or nominee: 2007
- CAF Team of the Year: 2005, 2006
- Africa Cup of Nations Team of the Tournament: 2015

== See also ==
- List of footballers with 100 or more caps
