= Ibrahim Touré (footballer, born 1985) =

English footballer (1985–2014)

Personal information
- Full name: Ibrahim Obyala Touré; Touré Oyala Ibrahim
- Date of birth: 27 September 1985
- Place of birth: Bouaké, Ivory Coast
- Date of death: 19 June 2014 (aged 28)
- Place of death: Manchester, England
- Height: 1.90 m (6 ft 3 in)
- Position: Striker

Youth career
- 2002: ASEC Mimosas

Senior career*
Years	Team	Apps	(Gls)
2002–2003	ASEC Mimosas		
2003–2006	Metalurh Donetsk	0	(0)
2006–2007	Nice	0	(0)
2009–2010	Al-Ittihad Aleppo		
2010–2013	Misr Lel Makasa	24	(8)
2012	→ Telephonat Beni Suef (loan)	2	(0)
2013–2014	Safa	10	(6)
- * Club domestic league appearances and goals

Ibrahim Obyala Touré (27 September 1985 – 19 June 2014) was an Ivorian professional footballer who played as a striker. He was the younger brother of former Manchester City midfielder Yaya Touré and former Arsenal and Liverpool defender Kolo Touré.

Touré began his senior career with Ukrainian side Metalurh Donetsk in 2003, before joining French team Nice, originally on loan, following a successful trial. He also played for Al-Ittihad Aleppo, Makasa, Makasa, and Al-Safa. Touré died on 19 June 2014 in Manchester, England, from cancer. The Ivory Coast FA confirmed in a statement that the 28-year-old died in Manchester.
