= Edu (footballer, born 1978) =

Brazilian footballer

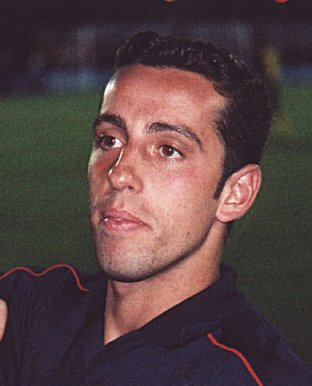
- Edu in 2006

Personal information
- Full name: Eduardo César Daud Gaspar
- Date of birth: 15 May 1978 (age 48)
- Place of birth: São Paulo, Brazil
- Height: 1.89 m (6 ft 2 in)
- Positions: Attacking midfielder; central midfielder

Senior career*
Years	Team	Apps	(Gls)
1998–2001	Corinthians	23	(0)
2001–2005	Arsenal	79	(7)
2005–2009	Valencia	50	(1)
2009–2010	Corinthians	15	(0)
Total		167	(8)

International career
2004–2005	Brazil	16	(0)
Medal record
Representing Brazil
FIFA Confederations Cup
Winner	2005
Copa América
Winner	2004
- * Club domestic league appearances and goals

Eduardo César Daud Gaspar (born 15 May 1978), known as Edu or Edu Gaspar, is a Brazilian former professional footballer who played as an attacking and central midfielder. He played for Corinthians in Brazil, Arsenal in England, and Valencia in Spain across a twelve-year career.

Edu played for the Brazil national team from 2004 to 2005, making sixteen appearances.

== Club career ==
=== Early career ===
Edu started his career in Série A with Corinthians. While with Corinthians, Edu won the 1998 and 1999 Brasileiro championships, and the 2000 FIFA Club World Championship.

=== Arsenal ===
After initially planning to join Arsenal in 2000, his transfer was put on hold after it was realised that he was in possession of a fake Portuguese passport. Months later, after qualifying for a European Union (EU) passport (aided by Italian lineage on his father's side), he signed for Arsenal on 16 January 2001 for £6 million. He had a turbulent time early on as his sister was killed in a car accident.

His Arsenal debut came in 2001 in a goalless draw tarnished by an injury after 15 minutes against Leicester City. He had replaced Freddie Ljungberg at half time only to be replaced by Dennis Bergkamp minutes later. It was an unfortunate start and he only managed to play in four more matches for the club during that season, one of which was a 0–3 defeat at home to Middlesbrough in which he contributed an own goal. His first goal for the club came against Grimsby in the League Cup on 27 November 2001. He went on to make a substitute appearance in the 2002 FA Cup Final as Arsenal emerged victorious. He also contributed 14 league appearances, and a goal against Aston Villa, as Arsenal won the 2001–02 Premier League, with Edu becoming the first Brazilian to win the Premier League.

In 2002–03 Edu made 18 appearances in the Premier League and featured heavily as Arsenal reached the FA Cup final for the third year running. Edu scored in Arsenal's fifth round win against Manchester United at Old Trafford, however injury issues in the latter part of the season meant he was left out of the squad for the final.

2003–04 season in midfield for Arsenal was seen as his finest season so far in football, he was part of the team which went 49 games unbeaten, (the whole 2003–04 Premier League season without defeat). He appeared in 30 League games and scored 2 goals, both against Chelsea, he scored the fourth of Arsenal's 5 in a 5–1 historic win against Inter Milan in the UEFA Champions League in November 2003, he made a career high 48 appearances and 7 goals for Arsenal in all competitions. Edu was on the pitch as Arsenal clinched the 2003–04 Premier League title at White Hart Lane on 25 April 2004. During the season, he made his 100th appearance for Arsenal.

Edu enjoyed mixed fortunes in the 2004–05 season. He missed the start of the season because he was away with Brazil at the Copa América. This was followed by speculation over his future at the club as he was in the last year of his contract with Arsenal. Talks with Valencia of Spain in January 2005 failed as the Mestalla outfit were not able to pay the fee Arsenal demanded.

Edu only scored two goals for Arsenal in 2004–05, both coming in May – one was a fine chip in the 2–0 away win at West Bromwich Albion, and the other a penalty kick in a 7–0 win over Everton. He did however come on as an extra time substitute as Arsenal won the 2005 FA Cup Final.

=== Valencia ===
In May 2005, it was confirmed that he would leave Arsenal in the summer on a Bosman ruling free transfer. Valencia, Juventus, Inter Milan, and Barcelona were hot favourites to secure the signature of Edu, and on 30 May, Valencia announced it had signed him to a five-year deal. Shortly after signing, Edu suffered a pre-season injury that ruled him out of first-team action until 4 April 2006, when he made his debut in the 5–3 victory over Cádiz. On 3 July 2009, the Brazilian midfielder left Valencia through contractual termination.

=== Corinthians ===
After being released in Spain, Edu signed a contract with his former club Corinthians on 6 August 2009, which was to last until 31 December 2011. After playing four matches during the 2010 season, his contract was terminated by mutual consent, and Edu announced his retirement from professional football.

== International career ==
Edu initially considered playing for the England national team upon gaining a British passport as he did not think he would be picked for Brazil. He finally got a call-up to the Brazil national team in 2004 and made his debut on 28 April 2004 in a friendly match against Hungary. He played for them in the 2004 Copa América and 2005 FIFA Confederations Cup, which were both won by Brazil. In the final of the Copa América 2004 he scored one of the penalties in the shootout as Brazil defeated Argentina.

== Post-playing career ==
On 17 March 2011, Corinthians announced that Edu would take over from William Machado as the club's director of football. He also assisted Carlos Queiroz's Iranian national team during the 2014 FIFA World Cup. From 2016 to 2019, he was the general coordinator of the Brazil national team.

On 9 July 2019, it was announced that Edu had become Arsenal's first-ever technical director. The club's director of football, Raul Sanllehi said: "We're very excited that Edu is joining the team. He has great experience and technical football knowledge and most importantly is a true Arsenal man. He understands the club and what we stand for to our millions of fans around the world." On 18 November 2022, Edu was appointed as Arsenal's first-ever sporting director. On November 4, 2024 it was reported that he was to leave his position at Arsenal to join and have a senior role at the network of clubs (Nottingham Forest, Olympiacos, Rio Ave FC) spearheaded by Greek businessman Evangelos Marinakis. His appointment as Global Head of Football was confirmed by Nottingham Forest on 7 July 2025. In March 2026 it was reported that he was told to stay away from the club training ground and facilities amid uncertainty over his future. On 14 September 2026, he was announced as a new member of the Board of Directors of Bulgarian First League powerhouse Levski Sofia.

== Media ==
Edu was involved in the Amazon Original sports docuseries All or Nothing: Arsenal, which documented the club by spending time with the coaching staff and players behind the scenes both on and off the field throughout their 2021–22 season. He was also involved in All or Nothing: Brazil National Team.

== Career statistics ==
=== Club ===
Appearances and goals by club, season and competition
Club	Season	League			Cup (Note: Includes FA Community Shield, EFL Cup, FA Cup and Copa del Rey.)		Continental (Note: Includes Copa Libertadores, Copa Mercosur, FIFA Club World Cup, UEFA Champions League, UEFA Intertoto Cup and UEFA Europa League.)		Total	
Club	Season	Division	Apps	Goals	Apps	Goals	Apps	Goals	Apps	Goals
Corinthians	1998	Série A	–		–		1	0	1	0
Corinthians	1999	Série A	–		–		14	0	14	0
Corinthians	2000	Série A	–		–		8	0	8	0
Corinthians	Total		–	–	–	–	23	0	23	0
Arsenal	2000–01	Premier League	5	0	–		–		5	0
Arsenal	2001–02	Premier League	14	1	8	2	5	0	27	3
Arsenal	2002–03	Premier League	18	2	7	1	4	0	29	3
Arsenal	2003–04	Premier League	30	2	10	2	8	3	48	7
Arsenal	2004–05	Premier League	12	2	2	0	4	0	18	2
Arsenal	Total		79	7	27	5	21	3	127	15
Valencia	2005–06	La Liga	6	0	–		4	0	10	0
Valencia	2006–07	La Liga	10	0	–		5	0	15	0
Valencia	2007–08	La Liga	13	0	4	0	1	0	18	0
Valencia	2008–09	La Liga	21	1	5	0	3	0	29	1
Valencia	Total		50	1	9	0	13	0	72	1
Corinthians	2009	Série A	11	0	–		–		11	0
Corinthians	2010	Série A	4	0	–		1	0	5	0
Corinthians	Total		15	0	–	–	1	0	16	0
Career total			144	8	36	5	58	3	238	16

=== International ===
Appearances and goals by national team and year
National team	Year	Apps	Goals
Brazil	2004	15	0
Brazil	2005	1	0
Total		16	0

== Honours ==
Corinthians

- Campeonato Brasileiro Série A: 1998, 1999
- FIFA Club World Championship: 2000

Arsenal

- Premier League: 2001–02, 2003–04
- FA Cup: 2001–02, 2004–05
- FA Community Shield: 2002

Valencia

- Copa del Rey: 2007–08

Brazil

- Copa América: 2004
- FIFA Confederations Cup: 2005

Individual

- Premier League Player of the Month: February 2004
