= Saint Aglibert =

Saint Aglibert may refer to:

- Agilbert (fl. c. 650–680), second bishop of the West Saxon kingdom and later bishop of Paris
- Agilbert of Créteil, martyred around AD 400
