= Yves Pires =

French artist (born 1958)

- Born: Yves Pires; July 4, 1958 (age 68); Choisy le Roi, France
- Known for: sculptures
- Website: www.yvespires.com

Yves Pires is a French artist born in Choisy le Roi, France where one of his sculptures, “Elodie”, can now be seen in the neighbourhood of Seine et Parc. He dedicates himself exclusively to his greatest passion which is sculpture, mainly working with bronze. He was born in 1958.

== Early life and education ==
Of a shy nature in his early years, he took refuge in drawing and explored his inner world of imagination and discovery. He took an early interest in fine art and at age 16 copied a painting of Vermeer, The Young Girl with Turban, also perhaps more commonly known as the Girl with a Pearl Earring. He then explored a variety of media including drawing, engraving, silk screen printing, sculpture and casting and left art school at the age of 19.

== Artistic career ==
After art school he set about learning building technology alongside his father with whom he worked for a dozen years renovating apartments. He then became a set decorator for television series like Les Muscle or Helene et les Garcons. He also collaborated on a project for France2 relating to the production of a made-for-television movie adapted from “20,000 Leagues Under the Sea” by Jules Verne and also did the stage design for a show by Sylvie Vartan.

== Interviews ==
He was the featured artist of the month in the magazine Gestion de Fortune and interviewed by Maurice-J. Estrade in October 2004, and again in May 2009. He was profiled in La Republique Du Centre on Monday February 5, 2007. He was featured in the Choisy Infos in May 2008.

== Influences ==
He cites among his influences Michelangelo for sensuality, Rodin for the life, strength and passion with which he was able to infuse his sculptures. Others that he admires are Camille Claudel, Carpeaux, Bugatti, as well as Canova, Houdon, Barye, and Rude. The photography of Doisneau, Weston, Herb Ritts, Elliott Erwitt are a continuing source of inspiration. In his sculpture he often represents femininity in its expression of sensuality, and with its gentleness of desire.

== Work ==
Some of his better known work includes sculptures such as: Sensualite, Le Saut, La Grande Panthere, Aurore, Esperance, Alena, Esa, Masha

== Exhibitions ==
His work has been exposed extensively including a permanent exhibition.

- 1999 to 2005 GALERIE GERARD MAILLET Galerie de l'Estrade 2005 - EXPOSITION PORTE DE VINCENNES 2005 - GRAND MARCHE D'ART CONTEMPORAIN BASTILLE
- AMBER ART GALERY - Salon "PAN AMSTERDAM" HOLLANDE November 2005 November 2006 November 2007 November 2008
- AMBER ART GALERY - Salon HERTOGENBOSCH - HOLLANDE April 2006 April 2007 April 2008 April 2009
- Galerie Hoche - VERSAILLES May 2006
- Galerie Hoche HOTEL DE PARIS - MONACO December 2006
- Guest of Honour at the SALON DES PEINTRES DU BOCAGE - FLERS November 2007
- GALERIE DU REGARD - SAINT PAUL DE VENCE March 2007
- GALERIE BARTOUX - MEGEVE July 2007
- GALERIE PAULETTE BOSSE - DEN HAAG November 2007 Guest of Honour at the 74ème SALON de la SOCIETE DES BEAUX ARTS DE CHOISY LE ROI March 2009
- GALERIE BERTHELLOT - PARIS May 2009
- Galerie CEDRIC - ESTRADE December 2009 GALERIE NEEL Cannes May 2009 May 2010 May 2011
- GALERIE ARTCLUB PARIS - EXPOSITIONS PERMANENTES Permanent exposition from February 2005 to present Events: February 2009 December 2010 February 2012
- GALERIE CLARUS - LIGNY LE RIBAULT June to July 2010 June to July 2011
- Banque BARCLAY'S - ORLEANS April 2011
- GALERIE PHAROS - MARSEILLE March 2011
- MERCEDES / BENZ CENTER - RUEIL MALMAISON EXPOSITION ART ANIMALIER March 2012
- GALERIE ARTCLUB - LYON December 2012
