= Saint-Christophe Church, Créteil =

Church building in France

Saint-Christophe Church
- Église Saint-Christophe de Créteil
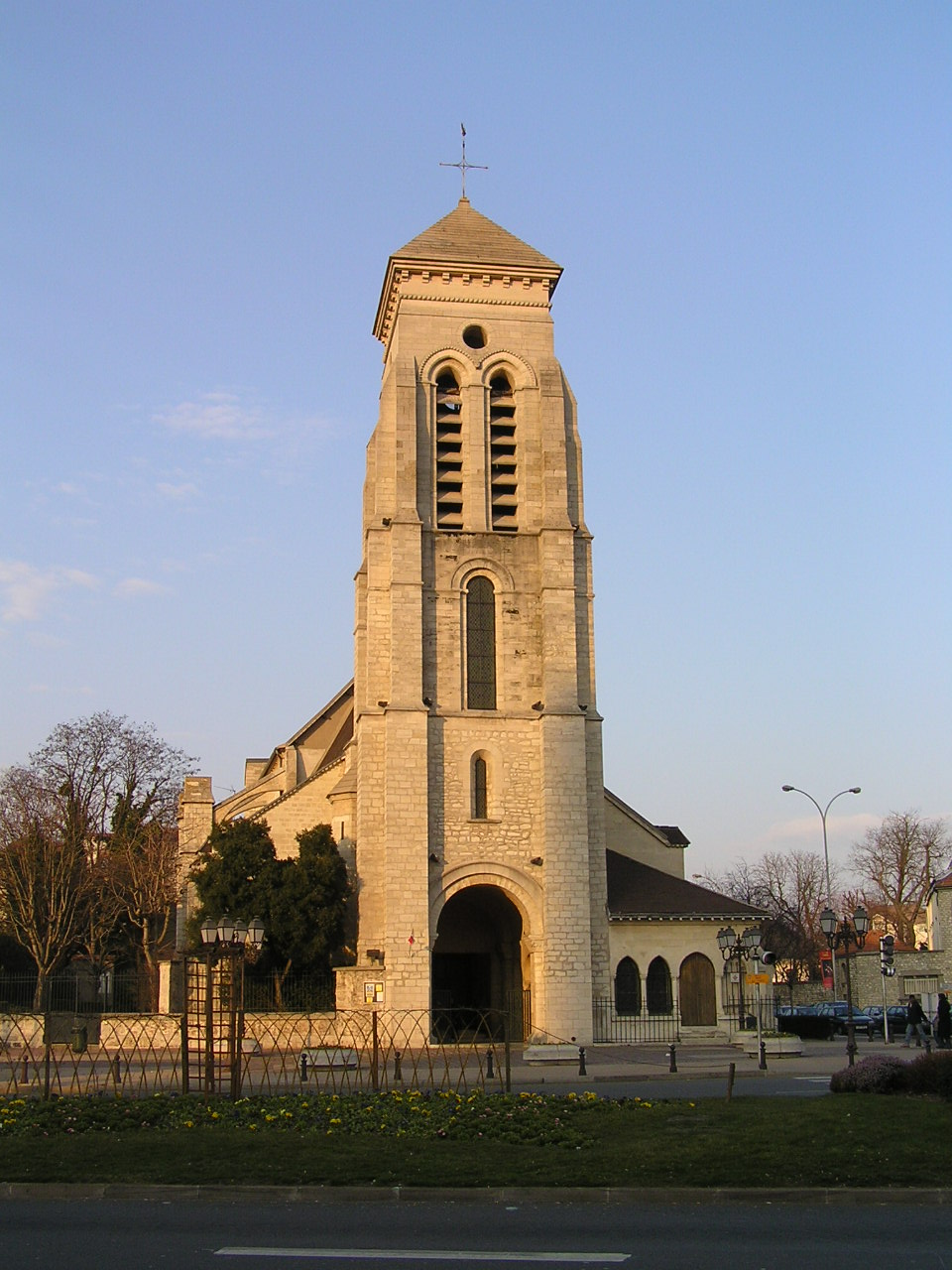
- Front view

- Location within France

Religion
- Affiliation: Roman Catholic Diocese of Créteil
- Province: Val-de-Marne
- Region: Île-de-France

Location
- Municipality: Créteil
- Country: France
- Interactive map of Saint-Christophe Church
- Coordinates: 48.7942°N 2.4613°E

Architecture
- Style: Romanesque and Gothic
- Groundbreaking: 11th century
- Completed: 20th century

Website
- eglisesaintchristophe.fr

Saint-Christophe Church is a Catholic church located in Créteil (Val-de-Marne). It is dedicated to Saint Christopher.

== History ==
The Saint Christophe church was built between the 11th and 13th centuries. Its crypt predates the 11th century. The first building dates from the Carolingian period. The bell tower was built in 1050, then the nave and the crypt. The Gothic architecture extension dates from the end of the 12th century. The church was completed at the end of the 13th century. It was listed in the inventory of historic monuments in 1928.

Since the Second Vatican Council reforms interesting historical pieces have disappeared from the interior. Thus the great high altar, gift of the Duchess of La Force no longer exists; as well as the large painting by the painter Vincent-Nicolas Raverat representing the martyrs of Créteil.

== Description ==
The church has a 7th century crypt. The church itself is in the 12th and 13th century ogival style. Its fortified bell tower, 30 metres (98 ft) high, dates from the eleventh century. The rest of the building is more recent and also combines Romanesque and Gothic elements. The 13th century nave encompasses the 7th century crypt containing the relics of Saints Agoard and Aglibert in the north corner. There are three naves separated by four vertical columns which define nine identical spans with groin vaults. This church has been classified as a historical monument since 1928.

Numerous archaeological excavations were carried out around the church, bringing to light in particular Merovingian sarcophagi and burials dating back perhaps to the 4th century. The neo-Gothic stained-glass windows of the chevet date from 1854: the three windows retrace the life of Christ. The stained-glass window in the northern chapel is dedicated to the Virgin and that in the southern chapel to Saint Genevieve. The other openings are decorated with grisailles dating from the end of the 19th century.

The bells are three in number: "Joséphine Élisabeth" (over 2,500 pounds) recast in 1867, Marie (less than 200 pounds) offered in 1552 to the chapel of Notre-Dame des Mèches and brought back to the church during the Revolution, and the Bell of the Martyrs (800 pounds) installed in 1992.

== Photographs ==
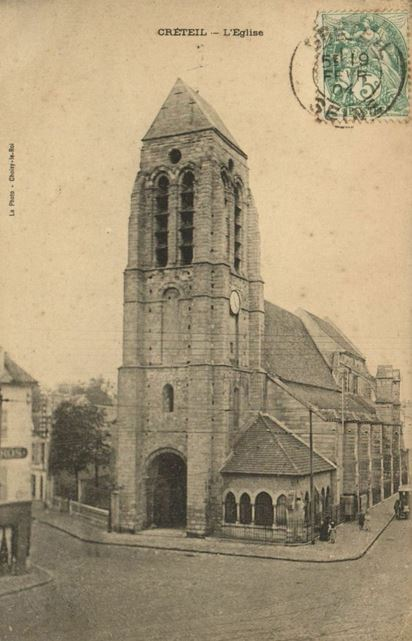
Église Saint-Christophe de Créteil

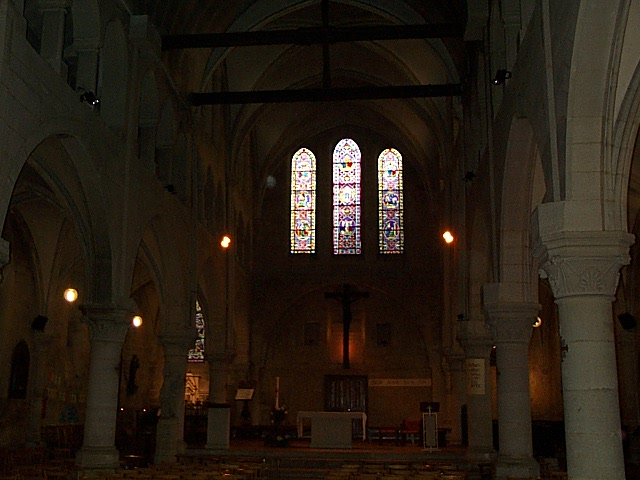
Interior of the church

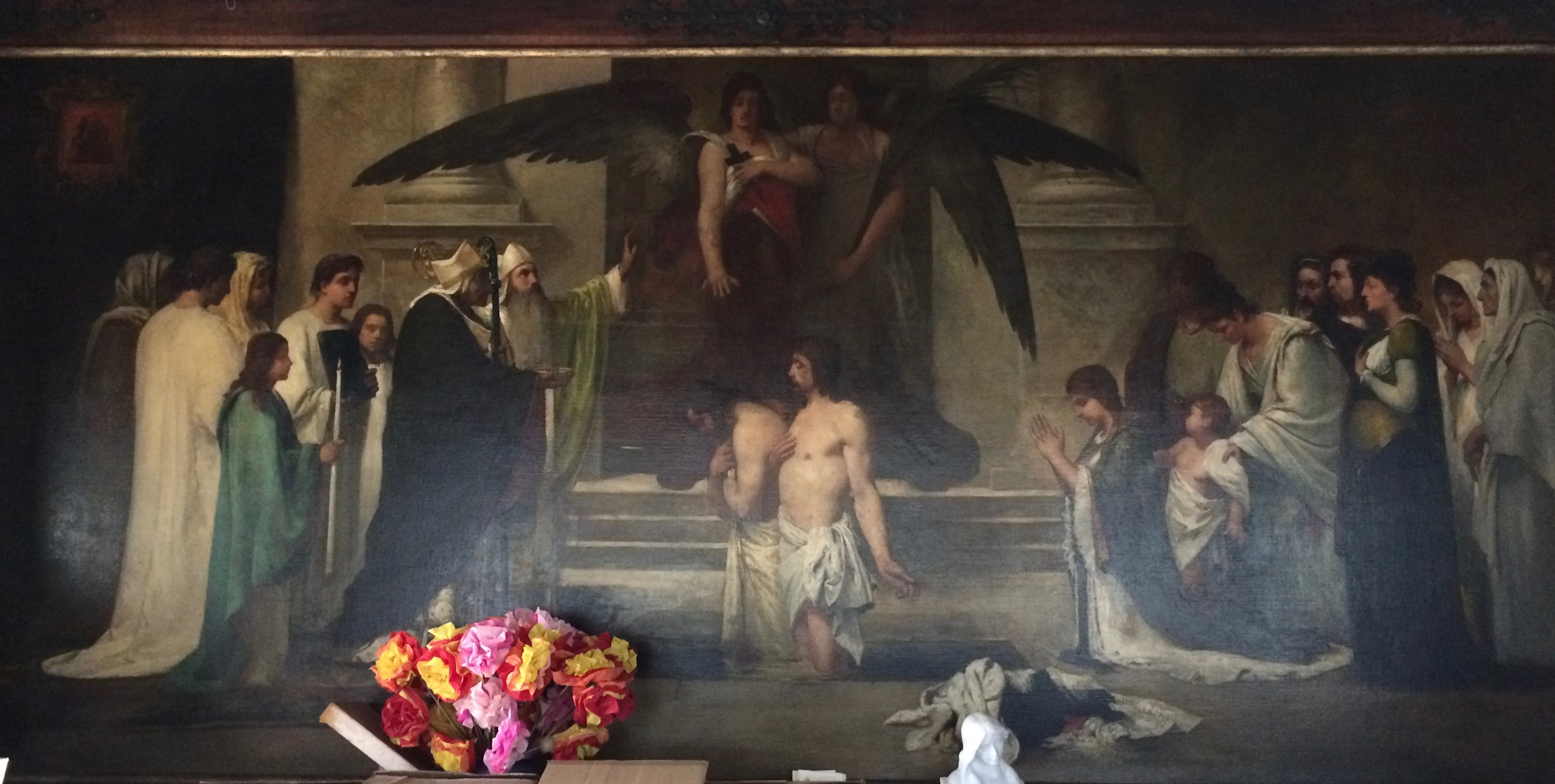
Baptism of the martyrs of Créteil

== Sources ==
- Dreux, André (1978), Créteil mon village (in French), Saint-Maur: Société d'histoire et d'archéologie le vieux Saint-Maur, p. 154
- Histoire de Saint-Christophe (in French), Eglise Saint-Christophe
- Mérimée
