= Créteil =

- Prefecture and commune
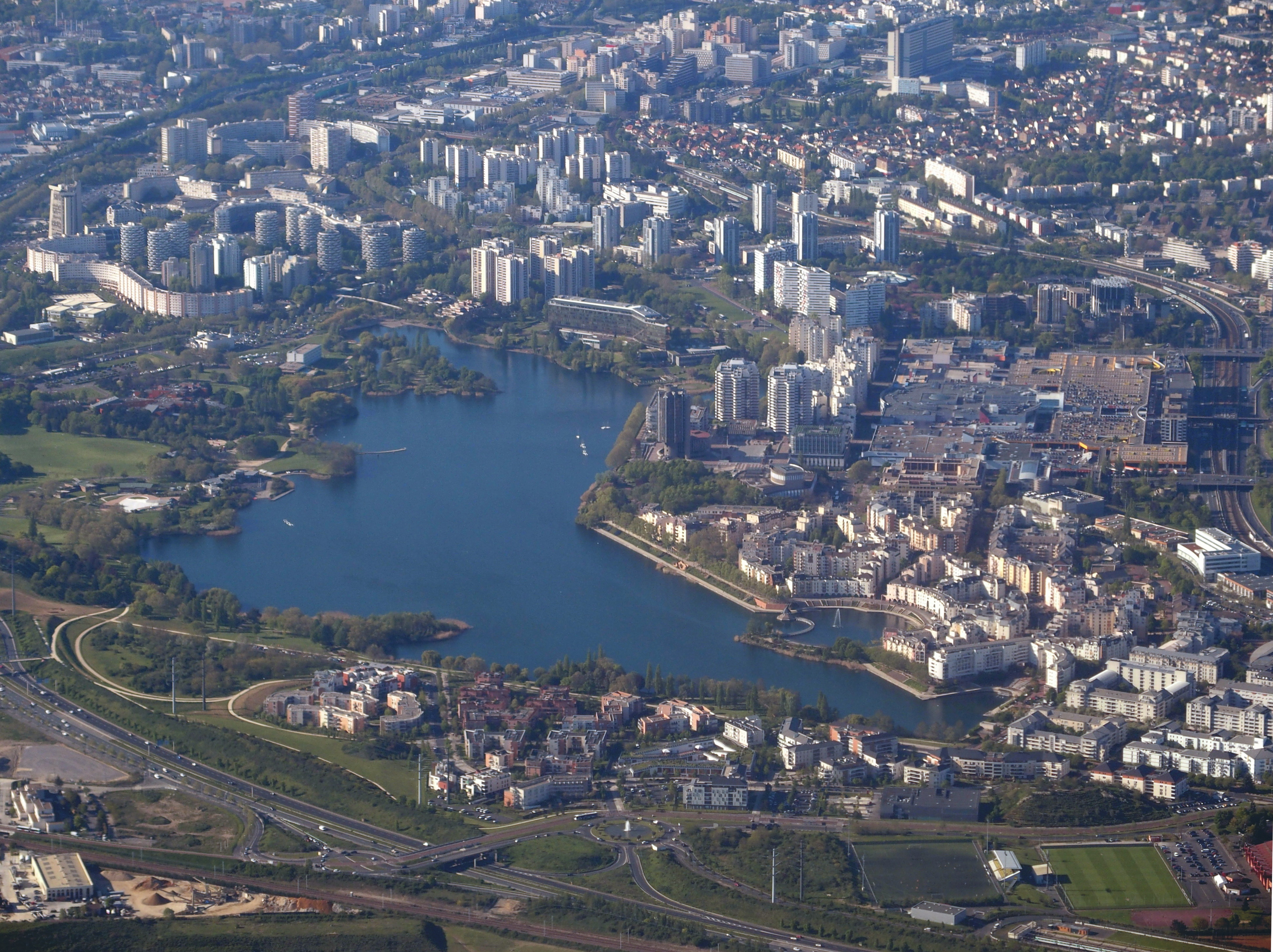
- Aerial view of Créteil, centered on the Lac de Créteil

- Coat of arms

- Location (in red) within Paris inner suburbs
- Location of Créteil
- Location within France Location within Île-de-France (region)
- Coordinates: 48°47′28″N 2°27′46″E
- Country: France
- Region: Île-de-France
- Department: Val-de-Marne
- Arrondissement: Créteil
- Canton: 2 cantons
- Intercommunality: Grand Paris

Government
  - Mayor (2026–32): Laurent Cathala
- Area^{1}: 11.43 km^{2} (4.41 sq mi)
- Elevation: 63 m (207 ft)
- Highest elevation: 74 m (243 ft)
- Lowest elevation: 31 m (102 ft)
- Population (2023): 93,397
  - Density: 8,171/km^{2} (21,160/sq mi)
- Time zone: UTC+01:00 (CET)
  - Summer (DST): UTC+02:00 (CEST)
- INSEE/Postal code: 94028 /94000
- ^{1} French Land Register data, which excludes lakes, ponds, glaciers > 1 km^{2} (0.386 sq mi or 247 acres) and river estuaries.

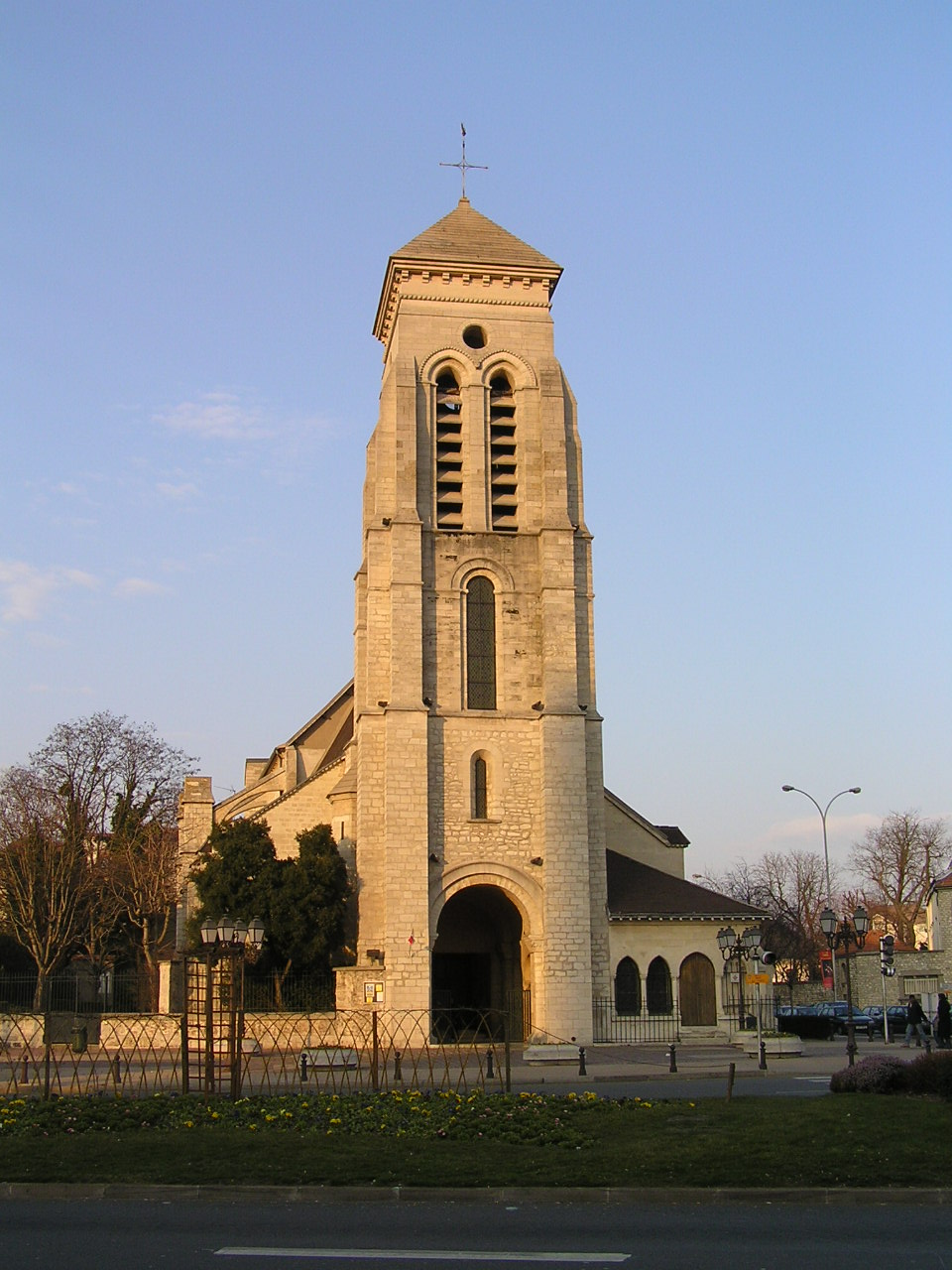
Saint-Christophe Church, Créteil

Créteil (French pronunciation: [kʁetɛj]) is a commune in the southeastern suburbs of Paris, Île-de-France. It is located 11.7 km (7.3 mi) from the centre of Paris. Créteil is the préfecture (capital) of the Val-de-Marne department as well as the seat of the Arrondissement of Créteil. The city is also the seat of a Roman Catholic diocese, and of one of France's 30 nationwide académies (districts) of the Ministry of National Education.

== Name ==
The name Créteil was recorded for the first time as Cristoilum in the martyrology written by a monk named Usuard in 865. The name Cristoilum is made of the Celtic word ialo (meaning "clearing, glade", "place of") suffixed to a pre-Latin radical crist- whose meaning is still unclear. Some believe crist is a Celtic word meaning "ridge", a cognate of Latin crista and modern French crête, in which case the meaning of Cristoilum would be "clearing on the ridge" or "place on the ridge." A more traditional etymology was that crist referred to Jesus Christ, due to the very ancient presence of Christianity in Créteil and the veneration of Saint Agoard and Agilbert of Créteil, martyred in Créteil around AD 400.

== Geography ==
Créteil is a commune in the south-eastern suburbs of Paris. It is watered by the Marne river which carries out its last loop before the junction with the Seine at the Charenton-le-Pont. The area is an alluvial plain eroded by the action of the Marne and the Seine. Bordering communes include Maisons-Alfort, Saint-Maur-des-Fossés, Bonneuil-sur-Marne, Limeil-Brévannes, Valenton, Choisy-le-Roi and Alfortville.

=== Climate ===
The climate in this area has mild differences between highs and lows, and there is adequate rainfall year-round. According to the Köppen Climate Classification system, Créteil has a marine west coast climate, abbreviated "Cfb" on climate maps.

== History ==
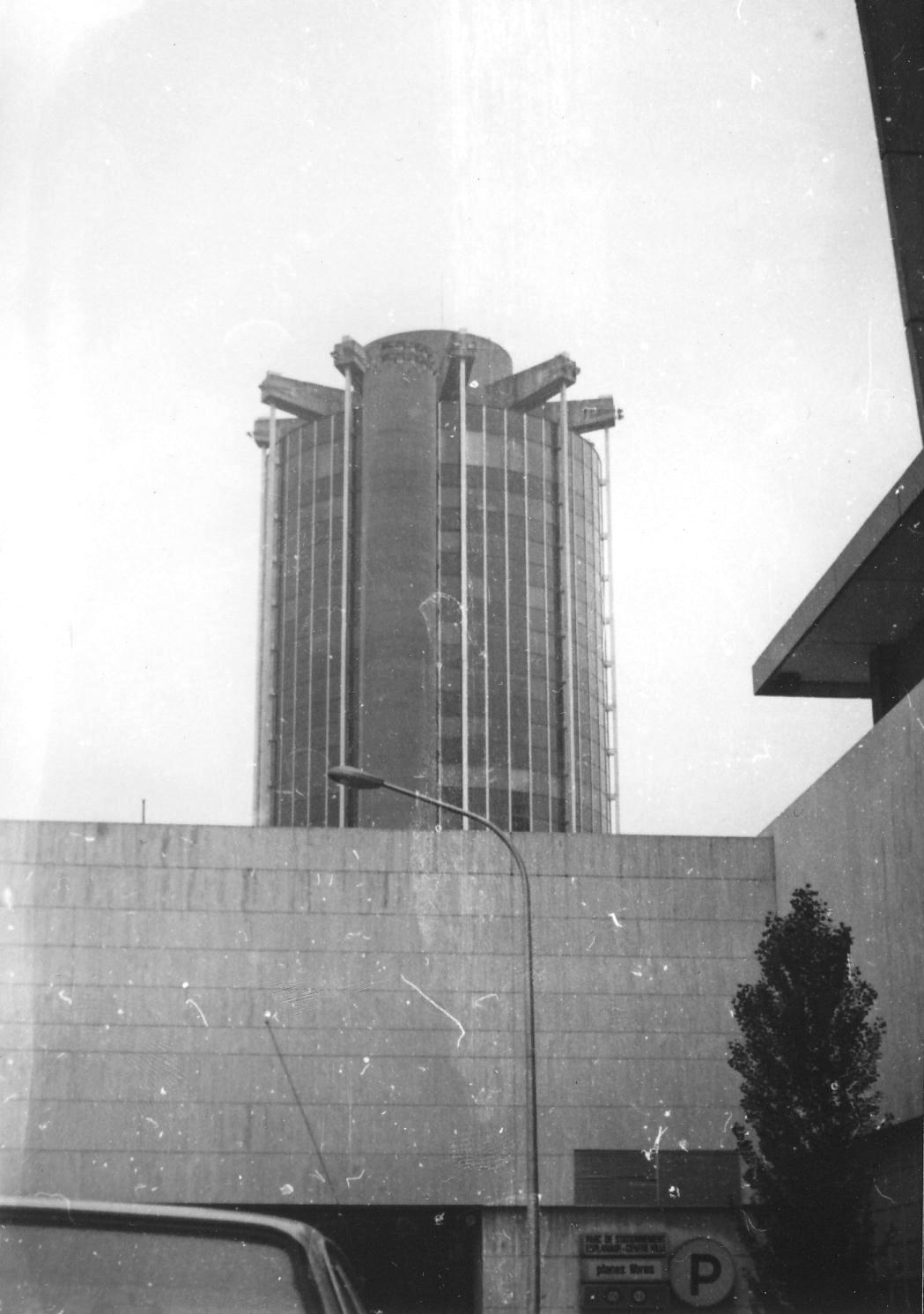
The Hôtel de Ville, 1981

Some rare flints from the Palaeolithic age are still being found in modern times in the area. It is, however, a two-ton, Neolithic-era polishing machine that is the prehistoric pride of Créteil. The first documents referring to Créteil are from the Merovingian era, when it was known as Vicus Cristoilum' The name comes from the prefix crist and oilum. These two terms are thought to be Gallic: "clearing" for oilum and "ridge" for crist. The "clearing" of the "ridge" of the Mont-Mesly is on the road connecting Paris and Sens (Trunk Road 19 today). In 1406, the place name "Créteil" makes its appearance after successive deformations from Cristoill (1278), Cristeuil, Cresteul then Creteuil.

During the French Wars of Religion (1567), the Huguenots plundered the church and burned the local charters. New disorders in 1648 forced the evacuation of the inhabitants of Créteil. The end of Louis XIV's reign was marked by a great food shortage throughout the whole of France after a terrible winter in 1709 that resulted in 69 recorded deaths in Créteil. Registers of grievances from the French Revolution in 1789 mention Créteil 15 times.

At the beginning of the 18th century, construction of the first middle-class "Parisian" houses began. In 1814, the east of Créteil was taken by Russian troops as part of the Battle of Paris. The bridge which spans the Marne between Créteil and Saint-Maur-des-Fossés was inaugurated on 9 April 1841, replacing an ancient ferry.

The Franco-Prussian War of 1870 was particularly cruel for Créteil. The borough was plundered and left in ruins by the Prussians, while the nearby battle of Mont-Mesly on 30 November 1870, left 179 dead.

L'Abbaye de Créteil or Abbaye group was a utopian artistic and literary community founded during 1906 named after the Créteil Abbey near to where some members lived and where the group held meetings. At the time Créteil was still mostly pastoral, some of which remains in the forested parkland of the riverside district on and around Île Sainte-Catherine. Although the group was short-lived, disbanding by 1908, it attracted artists, writers and philosophers to become associated with the Symbolist and Futurist movements such as Filippo Tommaso Marinetti, author of the Futurist Manifesto, and Constantin Brâncuși.

Créteil gave up its pastoral character after World War II. The population subsequently rose from 13,800 in 1954 to 30,654 in 1962. In 1965, the city became a Préfecture of the new department of the Val-de-Marne. A new Hôtel de Ville was completed in 1974.

== The lake ==
Créteil Lake began as a gypsum and gravel quarry. Once the groundwater was reached, forming deep ponds, the quarry was abandoned and allowed to fill with water. The lake area is now a popular recreational site attracting fishermen, boaters, wind surfers, etc...

== Demographics ==
=== Population ===
Historical population

Year	Pop.	±% p.a.
1793	946	—
1800	979	+0.49%
1806	1,000	+0.35%
1821	1,270	+1.61%
1831	1,496	+1.65%
1836	1,607	+1.44%
1841	1,826	+2.59%
1846	1,721	−1.18%
1851	1,546	−2.12%
1856	1,733	+2.31%
1861	2,412	+6.84%
1866	2,541	+1.05%
1872	2,823	+1.77%
1876	2,955	+1.15%
1881	3,430	+3.03%
1886	4,045	+3.35%
1891	4,090	+0.22%
1896	4,208	+0.57%
1901	4,923	+3.19%

Year	Pop.	±% p.a.
1906	5,500	+2.24%
1911	6,116	+2.15%
1921	8,169	+2.94%
1926	9,612	+3.31%
1931	11,596	+3.82%
1936	11,755	+0.27%
1946	11,008	−0.65%
1954	13,793	+2.86%
1962	30,403	+10.38%
1968	49,197	+8.35%
1975	59,023	+2.64%
1982	71,693	+2.82%
1990	82,088	+1.71%
1999	82,154	+0.01%
2007	89,410	+1.06%
2012	89,845	+0.10%
2017	90,605	+0.17%
2023	93,397	+0.51%

Source: EHESS and INSEE (1968-2023)

=== Immigration ===
Place of birth of residents of Créteil in 1999
Born in metropolitan France	Born outside metropolitan France			
73.6%	26.4%			
73.6%	Born in overseas France	Born in foreign countries with French citizenship at birth^{1}	EU-15 immigrants^{2}	Non-EU-15 immigrants
73.6%	3.9%	4.8%	2.2%	15.5%
^{1} This group is made up largely of former French settlers, such as pieds-noirs in Northwest Africa, followed by former colonial citizens who had French citizenship at birth (such as was often the case for the native elite in French colonies), as well as to a lesser extent foreign-born children of French expatriates. A foreign country is understood as a country not part of France in 1999, so a person born for example in 1950 in Algeria, when Algeria was an integral part of France, is nonetheless listed as a person born in a foreign country in French statistics.^{2} An immigrant is a person born in a foreign country not having French citizenship at birth. An immigrant may have acquired French citizenship since moving to France, but is still considered an immigrant in French statistics. On the other hand, persons born in France with foreign citizenship (the children of immigrants) are not listed as immigrants.

== Health ==
As of 1 January 2006, 27 pharmacies, about 60 dentists, about 60 general practitioners, 10 pediatricians, and a half-dozen ophthalmologists and dermatologists constitute the general medical staff of the city.

Health facilities include:

- Hôpital Henri-Mondor, a publicly owned hospital inaugurated on 2 December 1969. Conceived initially for 1,300 beds, its capacity today is 958 beds. It employs more than 3,000 people including more than 2,600 looking after patients. Its expenditure in 2004 was 241M€.
- Centre hospitalier intercommunal de Créteil, inaugurated on 3 November 1937. Capacity of reception of 530 in-patients as against 264 in 1937. The construction of this establishment was decided in 1932 by grouping the communes of the Bonneuil-sur-Marne, Creteil and Joinville-le-Pont within an inter-communal syndicate. Saint-Maur-des-Fossés joined this syndicate later. Originally, a number of the hospital personnel were religious sisters. In 2004, 38,037 hospitalizations were listed, with 2,551 childbirths and 12,838 surgical interventions. ] It employs approximately 2,000 people with about 1,600 of them caring for patients in medical or other capacities.
- Centre de Transfusion sanguine. The Blood Transfusion Centre of Creteil is run by the inter-communal Hospital. This service treats from 600 to 1,000 requests per day.
- Albert Chenevier Hospital. A publicly owned hospital, with a 463-bed capacity. There are 118 beds in the psychiatric ward.

== Education ==
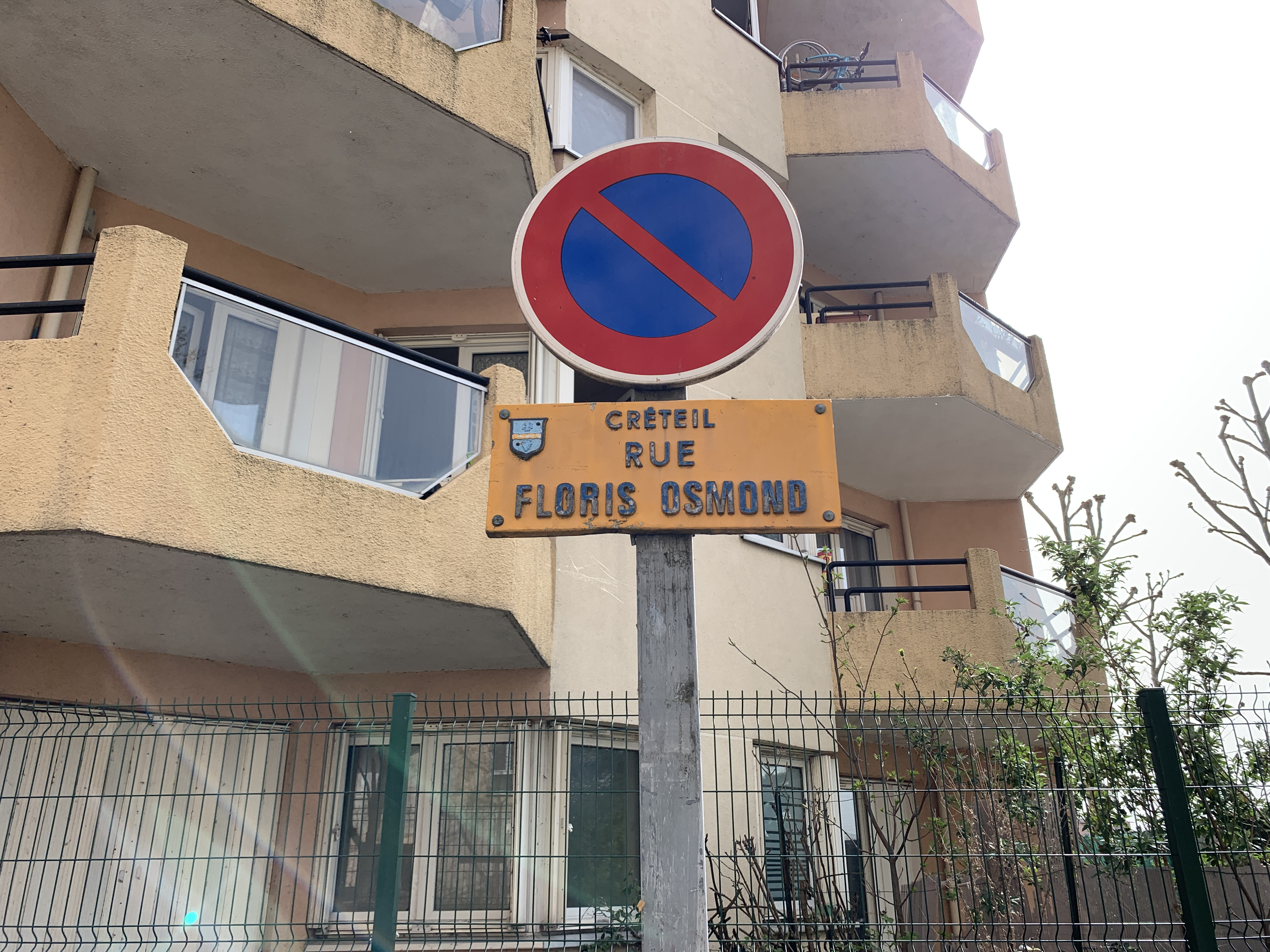
Plaque Rue Floris Osmond

=== Primary and secondary schools ===
Public schools:

- 24 preschools
- 24 elementary schools
- Eight junior high schools: Clément Guyard, Victor Hugo, Louis Issaurat, Amédée Laplace, Louis Pasteur, Plaissance, Albert Schweitzer, and Simone-de-Beauvoir
- Four high schools: Lycée Léon Blum, Lycée Édouard Branly, Lycée Gutenberg, and Lycée Antoine de Saint-Exupery

Private schools:

- Ozar HaTorah (Jewish school, includes preschool, elementary school, a junior high school divided into boys' and girls' schools, and a high school divided into boys' and girls' schools)
- De Maillé (elementary school, junior high school)
- Lycée général et technologique de l'ensemble Sainte-Marie
- Lycée d'enseignement supérieur technique privé SUPTEK

=== Universities ===
The city hosts Paris 12 Val de Marne University, officially the Paris-Est Créteil Val-de-Marne University, founded in 1970. Previously known as Université Paris 12 Val de Marne or Université Paris XII, the university serves more than 30,000 students and consists of seven units of formation and research (UFR), namely law, administration, literature, medicine, business & management, educational sciences and technological sciences.

== Transport ==
Créteil is served by four stations on Paris Métro Line 8: Créteil–L'Échat, Créteil–Université, Créteil–Préfecture and Pointe du Lac as well as by the Créteil Pompadour station of the RER D.

== Sport ==
US Créteil-Lusitanos, founded in 1936, is the city's football club. They currently play in National Championship (3rd division) and their home stadium is Stade Dominique Duvauchelle.

The US Créteil Handball team handball team plays at the Palais des Sports Robert Oubron. The capacity of the arena is 2,500 people.

== Notable people ==
- Jordan Aboki, basketball player
- Bertrand Amoussou-Guenou, mixed martial artist
- Christiane Martel, Miss Universe 1953
- Jacques Barzun, author, historian
- Mathieu Bastareaud, rugby player
- Herve Bazile, footballer
- Maxime Biamou, footballer
- Stephane Caristan, athlete
- Isaia Cordinier, basketball player
- Bruno Coqueran, basketball player
- Eddy de Pretto, singer
- Mohamed Diamé, footballer
- Philippe Di Folco, writer
- Herve Ebanda, footballer
- Sylviane Félix, athlete
- Lina Jacques-Sebastien, athlete
- Madeleine Jurgens, archivist
- Lahaou Konate, basketball player
- Jessie Londas, footballer
- Azrack Mahamat, footballer
- Axel Médéric, figure skater
- Modibo Niakate, basketball player
- Michael Nkololo, footballer
- Floris Osmond, metallurgist
- Fabien Paschal, basketball player
- Marc Raquil, athlete
- Christopher Samba, footballer
- Camille Serme, squash player
- Richard Soumah, footballer
- Serge Thion, sociologist
- Sammy Traoré, footballer
- Dan-Axel Zagadou, footballer
- Sylvain Francisco, basketball player

== Twin towns – sister cities ==
Créteil is twinned with:

- Les Abymes, Guadeloupe, France
- Falkirk, Scotland, United Kingdom
- Gyumri, Armenia
- Kiryat Yam, Israel
- Mataró, Spain
- Loulé, Portugal
- Playa (Havana), Cuba
- Salzgitter, Germany

== See also ==
- Communes of the Val-de-Marne department
