= Hôtel de Ville, Créteil =

Town hall in Créteil, France

Hôtel de Ville
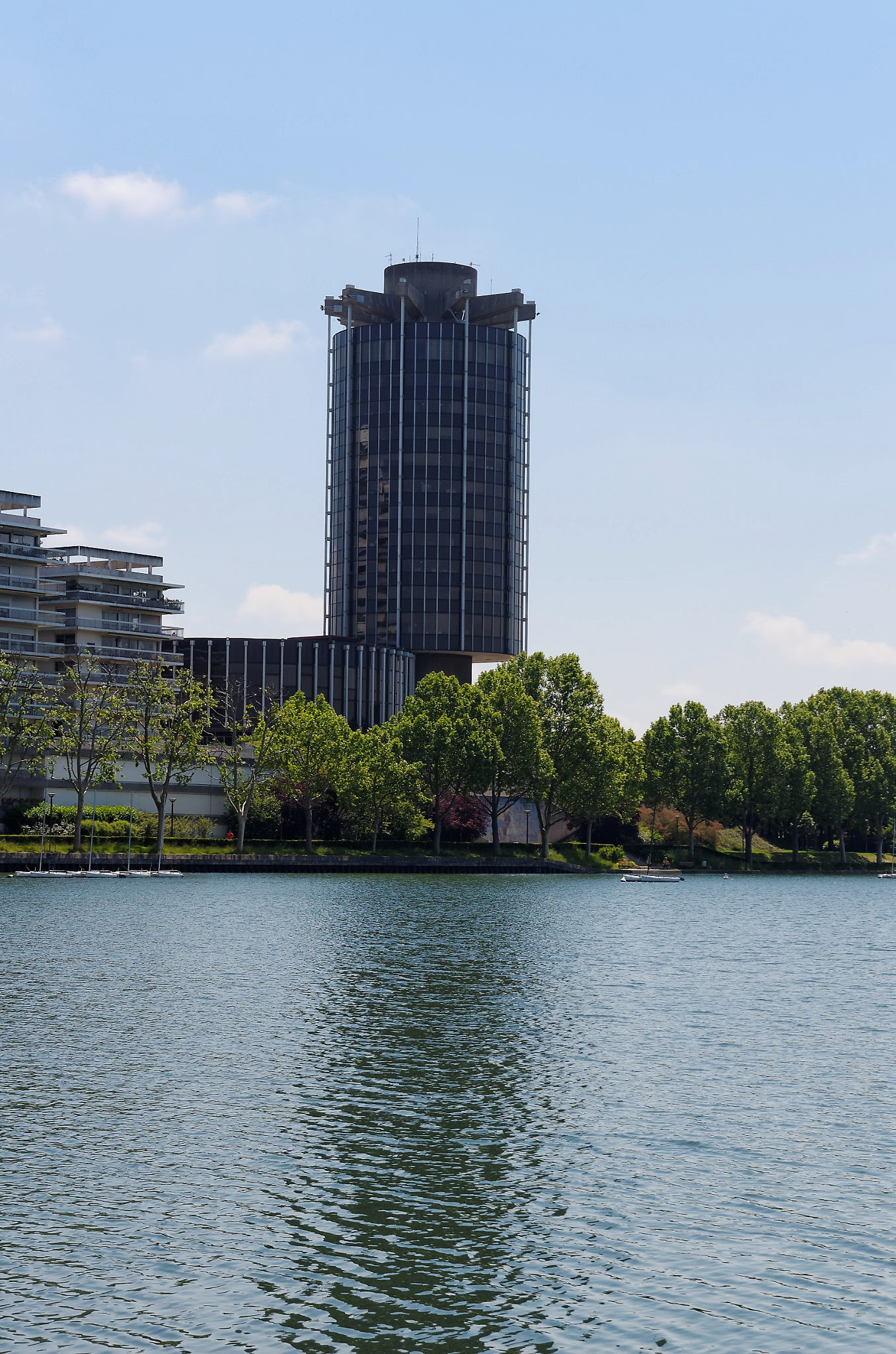
- The Lac de Créteil, with the tower of the Hôtel de Ville in the background, in July 2013
- Interactive map of the Hôtel de Ville area

General information
- Type: City hall
- Architectural style: Modern style
- Location: Créteil, France
- Coordinates: 48.7779°N 2.4532°E
- Completed: 1974

Height
- Height: 75 metres (246 ft)

Design and construction
- Architect: Pierre Dufau

The Hôtel de Ville (French pronunciation: [otɛl də vil], City Hall) is a municipal building in Créteil, Val-de-Marne, in the southeast suburbs of Paris, France, standing on Place Salvador-Allende.

== History ==
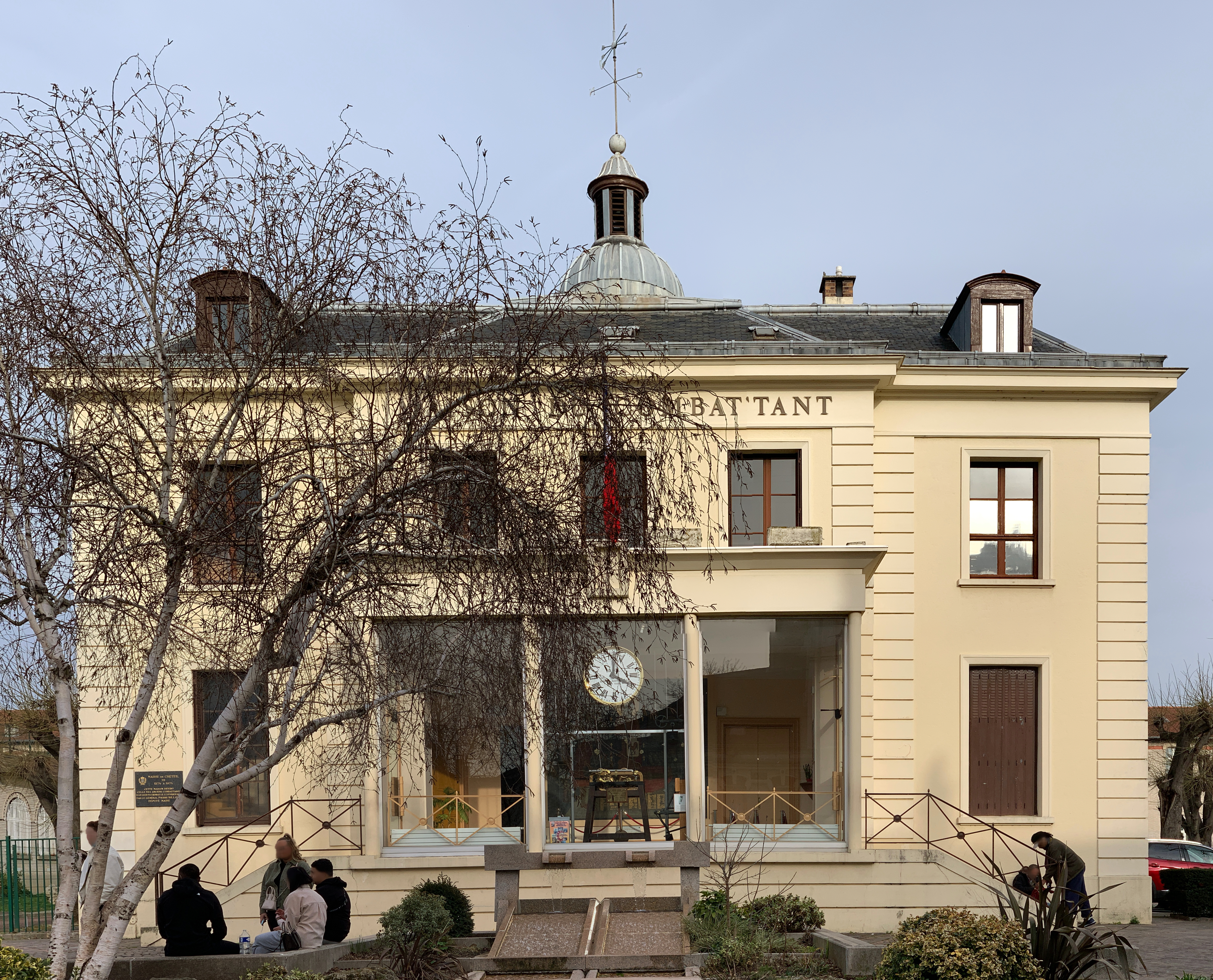
The first town hall

The first town hall in Créteil was commissioned by the Poncet family as a private house in the mid-18th century. It was designed by Nicolas Le Camus de Mézières in the neoclassical style, built in ashlar stone and was completed in 1760. The design involved a symmetrical main frontage of five bays facing onto what is now Rue du Général Leclerc. The central section of three bays originally featured a forestair leading up to a central doorway flanked by two tall casement windows with window shutters. The other bays on the ground floor and the bays on the first floor were fenestrated in a similar style. At roof level, there were originally three dormer windows, with the central window encased in a larger surround. Behind the central dormer window there was a dome with an octagonal belfry and a weather vane.

The building was acquired by a royal courtier, Jean d'Ariendolle, in the 1770s, and by a senior naval officer, Vice-Admiral Louis-René Levassor de Latouche Tréville, in 1790. It was then renamed "Villa Galatea", after the admiral's daughter, Désirée Galatea. In the mid-19th century, it became the property of the Rabourdin family, who sold it to the town council in 1874. The council then converted the building for municipal use. Internally, the principal rooms were the Salle du Conseil (council chamber) and the Salle des Mariages (wedding room). The wedding room was decorated with landscapes painted by Eugène Simas in the late 19th century.

During the night of 21 August 1944, during the Second World War, the French Forces of the Interior captured the town hall, detained the representatives of the Vichy regime and installed a committee of liberation. In 1965, the building was modified with a new porch, formed by four piers supporting an entablature, with plate glass in each of the openings.

Following a substantial increase in the population, the town council decided to commission a more substantial town hall. The site they selected was on the east bank of the Lac de Créteil, a former quarry which had been rejuvenated as a large water feature. Construction of the new building started in 1972. It was designed by Pierre Dufau in the modern style, built in steel and glass and was officially opened by the mayor, Pierre Billotte, on 5 December 1974. The layout involved a four-storey drum-like structure, which accommodated the civic rooms, and an-11-storey circular tower, which accommodated the municipal offices and was 75 metres (246 ft) high. Internally, the principal rooms included the Salle du Conseil (council chamber) and the Salle des Mariages (wedding room).

Meanwhile, the old town hall was handed over to the local veterans committee for use as the Maison du Combattant (House for Soldiers).
