= Maleye N'Doye =

Senegalese basketball player and coach

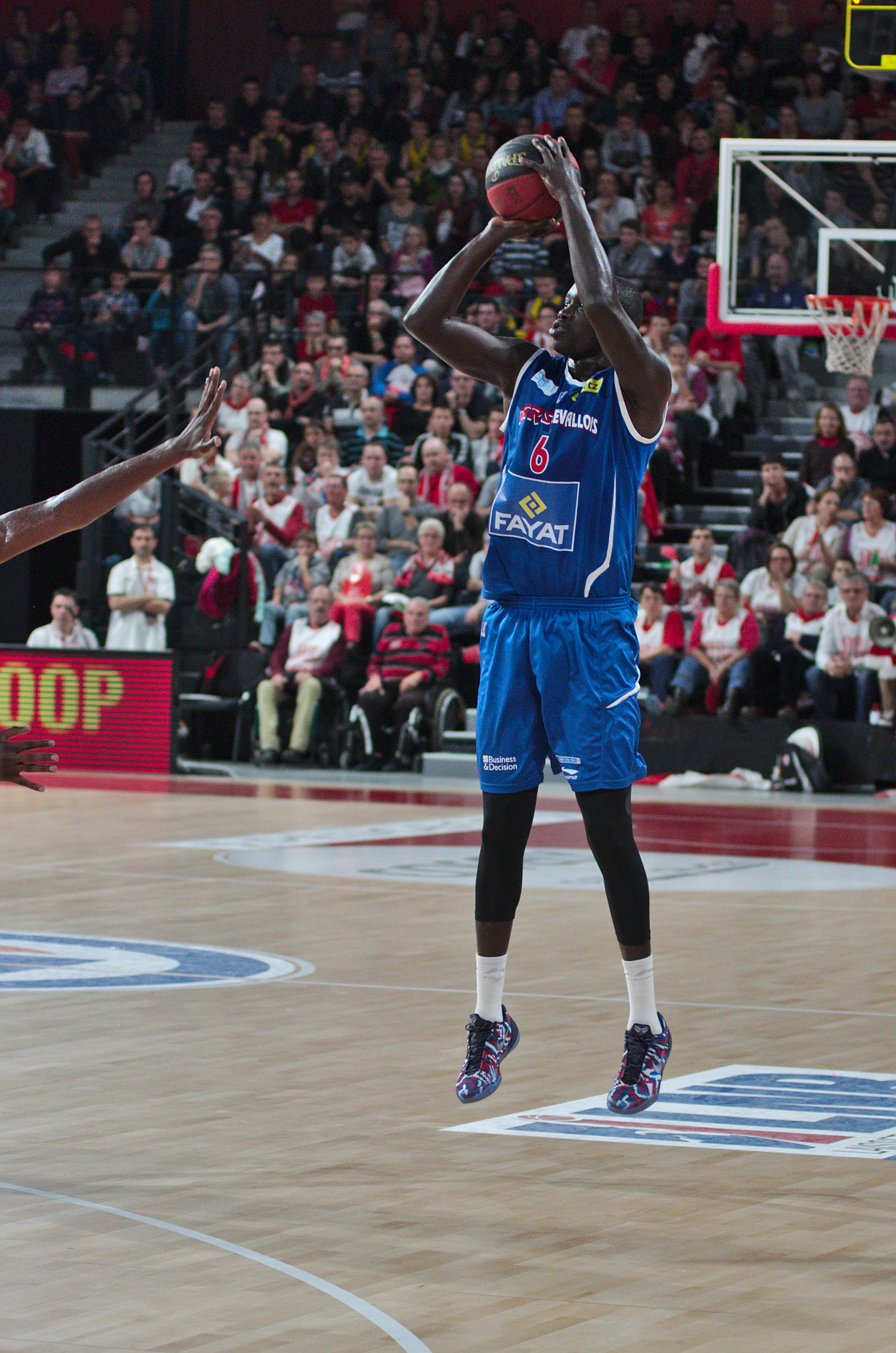

BBC Nyon
- Position: Head coach
- League: Swiss Basketball League

Personal information
- Born: August 19, 1980 (age 46) Dakar, Senegal
- Listed height: 6 ft 8 in (2.03 m)

Career information
- College: Furman (2000–2004)
- NBA draft: 2004: undrafted
- Playing career: 2004–2024
- Coaching career: 2024–present

Career history

Playing
- 2004–2005: SL Benfica
- 2005–2008: JDA Dijon
- 2008–2010: Le Mans
- 2010–2012: Orléans
- 2012–2017: Paris-Levallois / Levallois Metropolitans
- 2017–2018: RAC Basket
- 2018–2024: BBC Nyon

Coaching
- 2024-present: BBC Nyon
Medals
Men's basketball
Representing Senegal
AfroBasket
| Bronze medal – third place | 2017 Tunisia/Senegal |

Maleye N'Doye (born August 19, 1980) is a Senegalese professional basketball coach and former player who is the head coach for BBC Nyon of the Swiss Basketball League. He is a member of the Senegalese national team, where he participated at the 2014 FIBA Basketball World Cup.

N'Doye joined BBC Nyon in 2018. He re-signed with the team on August 6, 2020.
