= Jessie Londas =

French footballer (born 1985)

Personal information
- Date of birth: January 12, 1985 (age 41)
- Place of birth: Créteil, France
- Height: 1.81 m (5 ft 11 in)
- Position: Libero

Team information
- Current team: Auxerre
- Number: 12

Youth career
- 1994–1996: Olympique Rillieux
- 1996–1998: US Créteil-Lusitanos
- 1998–1999: Olympique Rillieux
- 1999–2006: AJ Auxerre

Senior career*
Years	Team	Apps	(Gls)
2006–2010	Auxerre B	45	(0)
2009–	AJ Auxerre	5	(3)
- * Club domestic league appearances and goals as of 05:43, 4 February 2008 (UTC)

Jessie Londas (born 12 January 1985) is a French former footballer who played as defender for Auxerre in the French Ligue 1.

== See also ==
- Football in France
- List of football clubs in France
