= Volcy =

Volcy is a surname. Notable people with the surname include:

- Jean-Marc Volcy (born 1966), Seychellois composer, performer, and songwriter
- Ricky Volcy (born 1982), Canadian basketball player
