= Gino Lanisse =

Haitian basketball player

Personal information
- Born: November 28, 1981 (age 44) Haiti
- Listed height: 6 ft 7 in (2.01 m)

Career information
- NBA draft: 2003: undrafted
- Playing career: 2004–2019
- Position: Power forward / Center
- Number: 34

Career history
- 2004–2005: Pully Lausanne Foxes Espoirs
- 2004–2005: Union Neuchatel Basket
- 2005–2009: BBC Nyon
- 2009–2010: MGS Grand-Saconnex
- 2010–2011: Union Neuchâtel Basket
- 2012–2014: BBC Nyon
- 2014–2015: Lugano Tigers
- 2015–2019: BBC Nyon

Career highlights
- LNA All-Domestic Players Team (2014)

Gino Lanisse (born November 28, 1981) is a former Haitian professional basketball player, who last played for BBC Nyon in the Ligue Nationale de Basket in Switzerland.

== Early years ==
Lanisse was born in Haiti.

== Professional ==
Lanisse has played for the BBC Lausanne (LNA), MGS Grand-Saconnex (LNA), Union Neuchâtel Basket (LNA), BBC Nyon (LNA), Lugano Tigers.
