= BBC Nyon =

- Leagues: SBL
- Location: Nyon, Switzerland
- Team colors: blue, white

BBC Nyon is a Swiss men's basketball club based in Nyon, Switzerland. BBC Nyon plays in the SBL, the highest tier level of men's professional basketball in Switzerland. The team is coached by Maleye N'Doye.

== Notable players ==
- (Australia) Biwali Bayles
- (Haiti) Gino Lanisse
- (Switzerland) Julien Senderos
- (Finland) Ville Kaunisto
- (Senegal) Maleye N'Doye
- (Serbia) Srđan Živković
- (Canada) Ricky Volcy
- (Switzerland) Jérémy Jaunin
- (France) Zaïnoul Bah
- (United States) Ivan McFarlin
