= Madeleine Jurgens =

French archivist and historian (1919-2022)

- Born: Madeleine Marie Connat; December 19, 1919
- Died: January 7, 2022 (aged 102)
- Occupation: archivist

Academic background
- Education: École Nationale des Chartes
- Thesis: Étude sur les inventaires après décès de Paris (1500-1560) (1942)

Academic work
- Discipline: Archival science
- Sub-discipline: Paleography, Curator
- Institutions: Archives Nationales (France)

Madeleine Jurgens (1919–2022) was a French archivist and historian. Born Madeleine Marie Connat on December 19, 1919, in Créteil, she graduated from the École Nationale des Chartes in 1942. Her thesis focused on the estate inventories of Parisians during the first half of the sixteenth century. She was hired as a curator at the national archives in 1943 and was later promoted to in 1957. She was named an honorary curator in 1984.

Jurgens was the president of local historical preservation association for the town of Créteil for many years. She was also made a chevalier des Palmes académiques in 1954, a chevalier de la Légion d'honneur in 1967, an officier du Mérite in 1972 and an officier des Arts et Lettres in 1979. In 1988, she received the prix de la foundation Coyecque-Roze de l'Académie des inscriptions et belle-lettres.

== Publications ==
Jurgens published works on the town of Créteil, as well as topics related to her work in the archives, including Parisian theatre in the seventeenth century, the history of music, Molière, confraternities such as the Brotherhood of Saint Nicholas, and the role of pharmacists in the city of Paris in the eighteenth century.

- Créteil en son terroir, à travers rues et chemins, Société d'histoire et d'archéologie, 2009.
- La légende dorée de Créteil, Malesherbes: Maury impr, Société d'histoire et d'archéologie Les amis de Créteil, 2006.
- Cent ans de recherches sur Molière, avec Elizabeth Maxfield-Miller. Paris: Archives nationales, 1963.
- La Confrérie de Saint-Nicolas, with Georges Signier and Maurice Bouvet. Villiers-le-Bel, 1950.
