= Philippe Senderos =

Swiss footballer (born 1985)

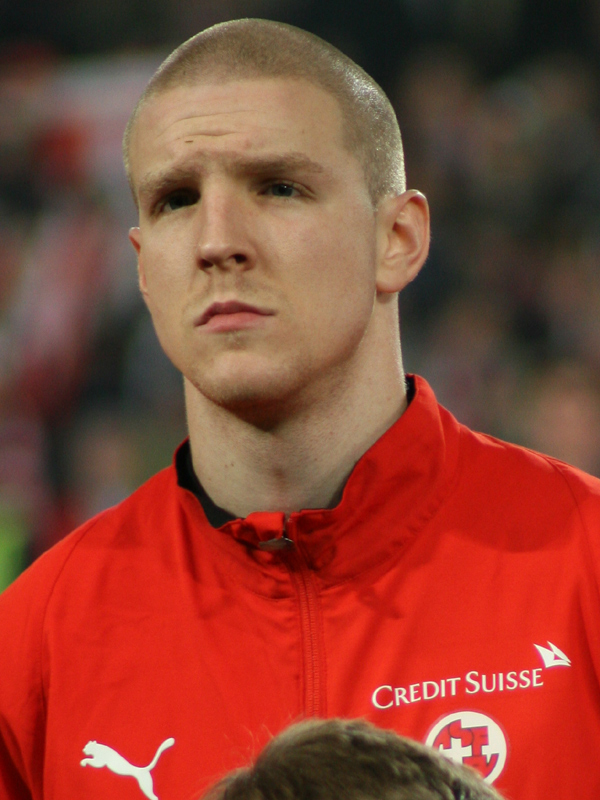
- Senderos with Switzerland in 2006

Personal information
- Full name: Philippe Sylvain Senderos
- Date of birth: 14 February 1985 (age 41)
- Place of birth: Geneva, Switzerland
- Height: 1.90 m (6 ft 3 in)
- Position: Centre back

Youth career
- 1992–2002: Servette

Senior career*
Years	Team	Apps	(Gls)
2002–2003	Servette	26	(3)
2003–2010	Arsenal	64	(4)
2008–2009	→ AC Milan (loan)	14	(0)
2010	→ Everton (loan)	2	(0)
2010–2014	Fulham	57	(2)
2014	Valencia	8	(0)
2014–2016	Aston Villa	8	(0)
2016	Grasshoppers	14	(0)
2016–2017	Rangers	3	(0)
2017–2018	Houston Dynamo	10	(4)
2019	Chiasso	3	(0)
Total		209	(13)

International career
2005–2016	Switzerland	57	(5)
Medal record
Representing Switzerland
Men's Football
UEFA European Under-17 Football Championship
Winner	2002 Denmark
- * Club domestic league appearances and goals

Philippe Sylvain Senderos (French pronunciation: [fiˈlip sɑ̃dɛˈʁos]; born 14 February 1985) is a Swiss retired professional footballer who played as a defender.

Senderos began his career at Servette, before moving to England as a teenager with Arsenal. He made 116 appearances over seven seasons with the North London club, and won the FA Cup in 2005. Following loans to Milan and Everton, he then moved to Fulham on a free transfer in 2010, where he played for four seasons. Senderos then had brief spells at clubs in Spain, England, Scotland, Switzerland and the United States.

A full Swiss international from 2005 to 2016, Senderos won 57 caps and scored 5 goals. He was included in the Swiss squads for three FIFA World Cups and at UEFA Euro 2008.

== Club career ==
=== Servette ===
Senderos came up through the youth team set up at Swiss club Servette. After a few appearances in his first season, he soon became a regular player in the first team. On 27 July 2002, Senderos scored a brace (and his first goal) in a 2–0 win over Luzern. Senderos signed for Arsenal in December 2002, though he remained working at Servette until the following summer. Shortly after joining Arsenal, Senderos' father and agent said Senderos rejected a move to Real Madrid in favour of joining Arsenal. Senderos himself claimed he made the right decision joining the Gunners.

=== Arsenal ===
Shortly after joining Arsenal, Senderos' start did not come as planned after he suffered a recurrence of a back problem for six weeks and another injury on a fractured bone in his foot, leaving him out for the rest of the season. During the season, Arsenal went undefeated and won the league.

Senderos was an unused substitute when Arsenal won the Community Shield against Manchester United ahead of the 2004–05 season. He made his debut as a starter in a 2–1 win against Manchester City in the third round of the League Cup on 27 October 2004, and played his first Premier League match on 1 January 2005 as an 82nd-minute substitute for the injured Sol Campbell. Profiting from Campbell's injury, Senderos finished his first Premier League season with 13 appearances. Despite Campbell's recovery, Senderos played the 2005 FA Cup final in his place, and won his first piece of silverware as Arsenal triumphed on penalties after a 0–0 draw with Manchester United.

After the season, Senderos committed his long-term future by signing an improved five-year deal. In the 2005 FA Community Shield, he was beaten by Didier Drogba for both goals as Arsenal lost 2–1 to Chelsea. During the 2005–06 season, he scored his first Arsenal goal in a 2–1 loss to West Bromwich Albion on 15 October, and again in a 7–0 win over Middlesbrough on 14 January. He played in Arsenal's run to the final of the UEFA Champions League in 2005–06, but was an unused substitute in the final, which Arsenal lost to Barcelona.

On 29 November 2006, Senderos was sent off for the first time in his career, in the 66th minute of Arsenal's 2–1 loss at Fulham for two bookings for offences on Luís Boa Morte. Later in the season, on 3 February 2007, he was sent off for the second time, a straight red card for a foul in the penalty box on Middlesbrough striker Yakubu.

Senderos received his third red card on 2 September 2007 after denying Nwankwo Kanu of Portsmouth a clear goalscoring opportunity, although Arsenal went on to win 3–1. In his last full season at the club (2007–08), Senderos added 2 more goals from 17 Premier League appearances: in a 3–2 win against Sunderland on 7 October and the fourth minute of a 2–0 win over Blackburn Rovers on 11 February.

==== Loan to AC Milan ====
Senderos eventually fell out of favour with Arsenal manager Arsène Wenger. On 27 August 2008, he joined Italian club AC Milan on a season-long loan. Senderos described joining Milan as a "dream come true". He quickly incurred an injury and struggled to make the first team ahead of centre-backs Paolo Maldini and Kakha Kaladze, but finally made his first full appearance for the Rossoneri in a UEFA Cup group stage match against Braga, and came on as a substitute for his first Serie A appearance, against Fiorentina, approximately halfway through the season. Despite wanting his move at Milan to be permanent, Senderos returned to Arsenal after 14 Serie A appearances.

==== Loan to Everton ====
Senderos made only two appearances for Arsenal in 2009–10, both in the League Cup, and on 25 January 2010, he joined Everton on loan for the remainder of the season, where he wore the number 23, vacated by the departure of Lucas Neill. He made his first appearance for the club in a 1–0 win away against Wigan Athletic. He returned to Arsenal at the end of the season having made only three appearances, two in the Premier League and one in the UEFA Europa League.

=== Fulham and Valencia ===
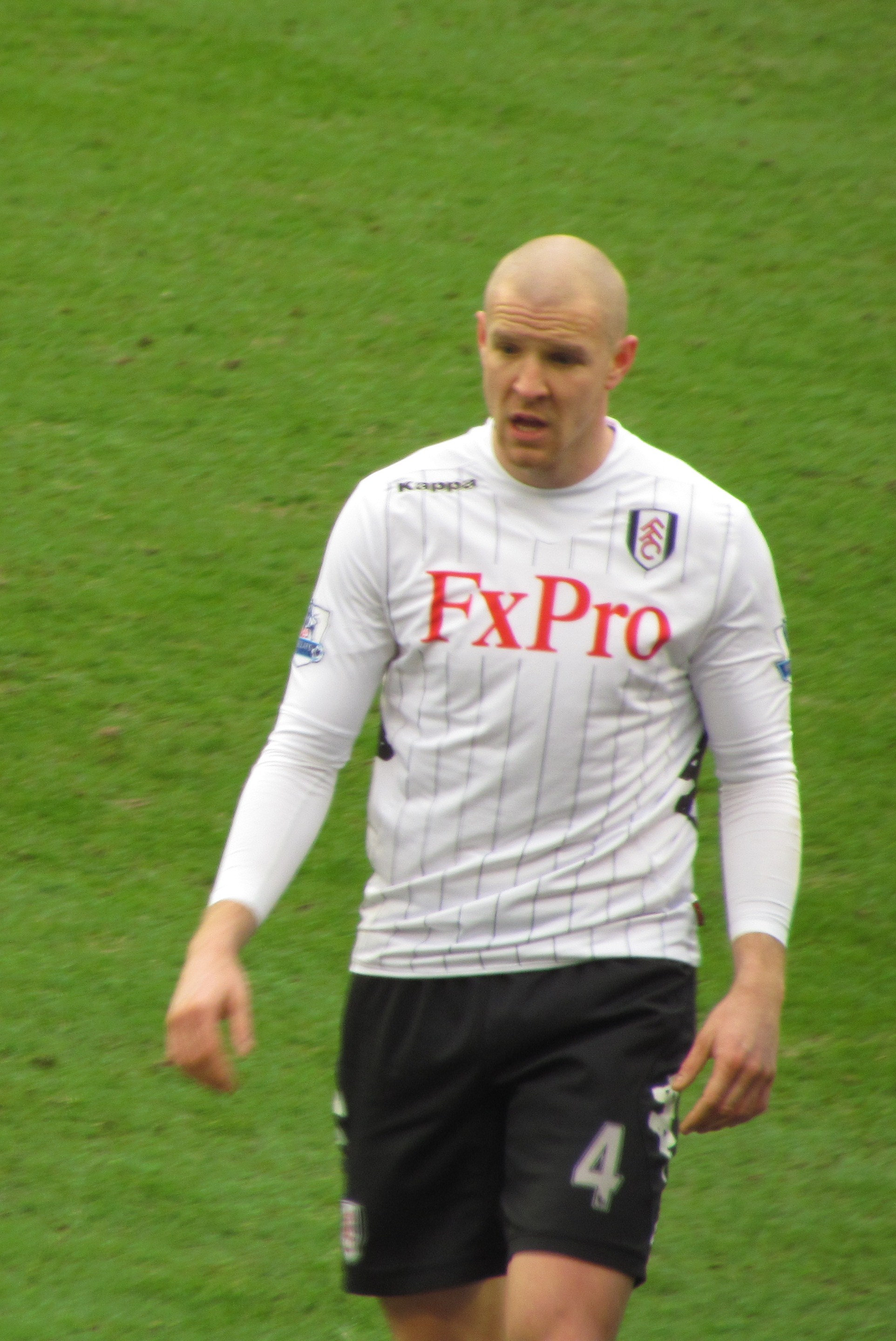
Senderos playing for Fulham in February 2013

On 8 June 2010, Senderos signed a three-year deal with Fulham on a free transfer. On 9 August, while training, Senderos tore his Achilles tendon, keeping him out for six months. He underwent surgery and was expected to be out for 6 months. He finally made his debut for Fulham on 30 April 2011 against Sunderland. On 21 April 2012, he scored his first Premier League goal since joining Fulham as they defeated Wigan Athletic 2–1 at Craven Cottage.

On 1 March 2013, Senderos signed a one-year contract extension, keeping him at the West London club until June 2014. On 21 October 2013, he scored a goal in a 4–1 win over Crystal Palace.

On 31 January 2014, Senderos joined Valencia from Fulham with just hours remaining before the transfer window was due to close. He made his Valencia debut on 8 February 2014, playing 81 minutes in the 5–0 home win over Real Betis in a La Liga match, and scored his first goal (a header) on 13 March in the 3–0 away victory over Bulgarian champions Ludogorets Razgrad in the first leg of the round of 16 of the UEFA Europa League.

=== Aston Villa ===
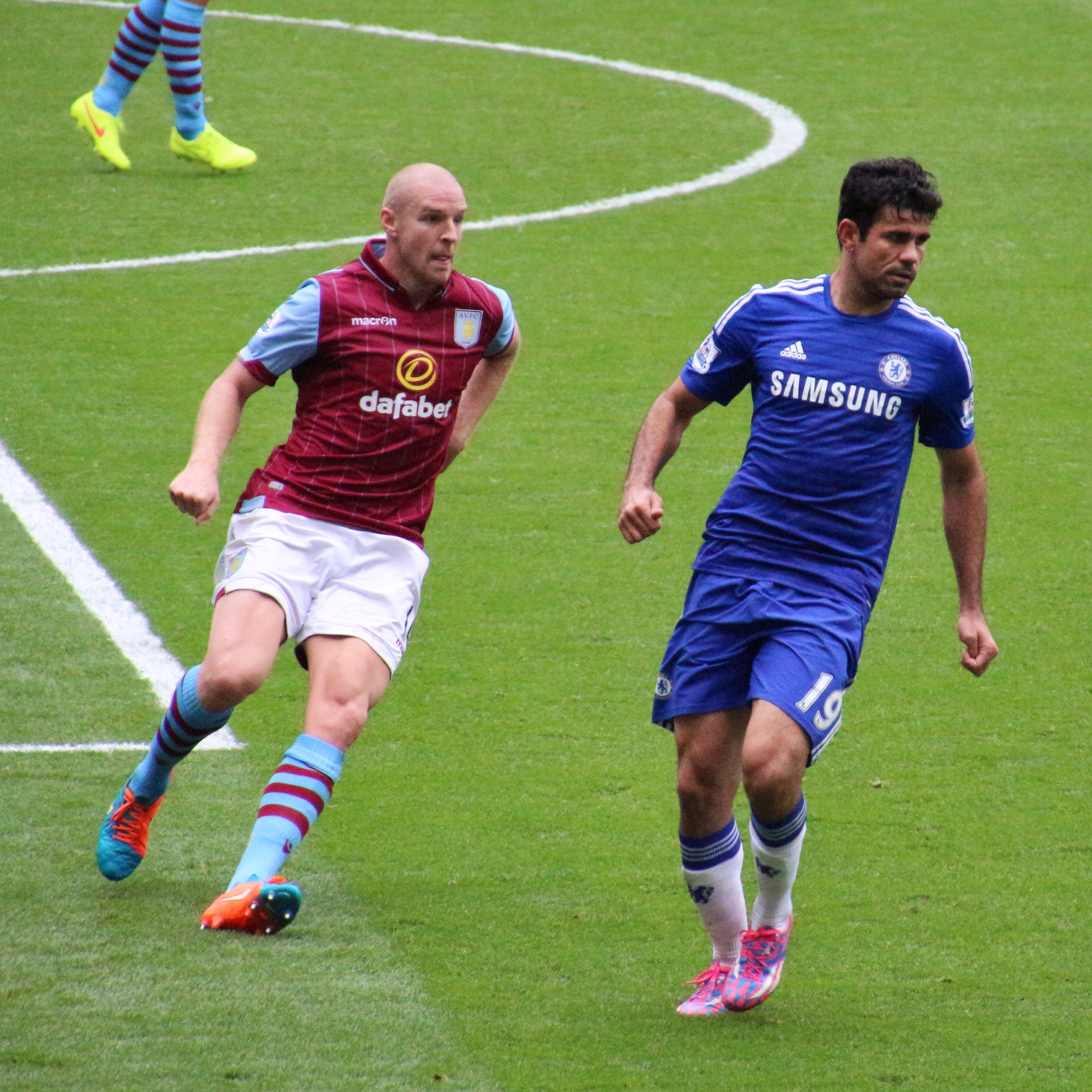
Senderos playing for Aston Villa against Chelsea in September 2014.

On 5 June 2014, Senderos joined Aston Villa on a two-year contract. He was signed by Paul Lambert, who said in the run-up to the 2014 FIFA World Cup, "This will be Philippe's third World Cup finals and there aren't too many players who compete at that level over that stretch of time. He'll be a great addition to the group." He made his Premier League debut for Villa in a 1–0 win at Stoke City on 16 August, playing the full 90 minutes.

On 3 September 2015, it was announced Senderos had been omitted from Aston Villa's 25-man squad for the first half of the 2015–16 Premier League season. The following 27 January 2016, he left the club by mutual consent.

=== Grasshoppers and Rangers ===
On 29 January 2016, just days after being released by Aston Villa, Senderos returned to his native Switzerland to sign for Grasshoppers on a six-month contract.

After being released by Grasshoppers, Senderos signed for Scottish Premiership team Rangers on a one-year deal on 31 August 2016, following a lengthy trial period. Upon signing, he said it was a "no-brainer" to join such a big club. Senderos was sent off on his debut for Rangers, a 5–1 defeat at Celtic in the Old Firm match on 10 September. Senderos was released in May 2017.

=== Houston Dynamo and Chiasso ===
On 7 August 2017, the Houston Dynamo of Major League Soccer (MLS) announced they had signed Senderos. Senderos made just two appearances in the regular season for a Dynamo squad that finished fourth in the Western Conference. However, injuries to first choice defenders A. J. DeLaGarza and Leonardo opened the door for Senderos to play for Houston in the postseason. Senderos was given the captain's armband by manager Wilmer Cabrera in the second leg of Houston's semi-final matchup away to the Portland Timbers, which Houston won 2–1 to advance to the Western Conference Finals.

Senderos scored in a 4–0 over Atlanta United in the 2018 season opener. However, he picked up a hamstring injury the next week that made him miss 10 games. On 3 July, Senderos scored in the 96th minute to give the Dynamo a 2–2 draw with LAFC. During the next game Senderos got a brace to lead Houston to a 3–0 win over Minnesota United. He would appear in every game of the 2018 U.S. Open Cup as he helped the Dynamo win their first such title in club history. He picked up a hamstring injury in the final that forced him to miss the rest of the season. His contract expired at the end of the 2018 season and the Dynamo decided to not re-sign him.

On 10 September 2019, Senderos signed with Swiss Challenge League side Chiasso. He made his debut for Chiasso on 9 November in a 4–1 win over FC Wil. On 16 December, he announced his retirement from football.

== International career ==
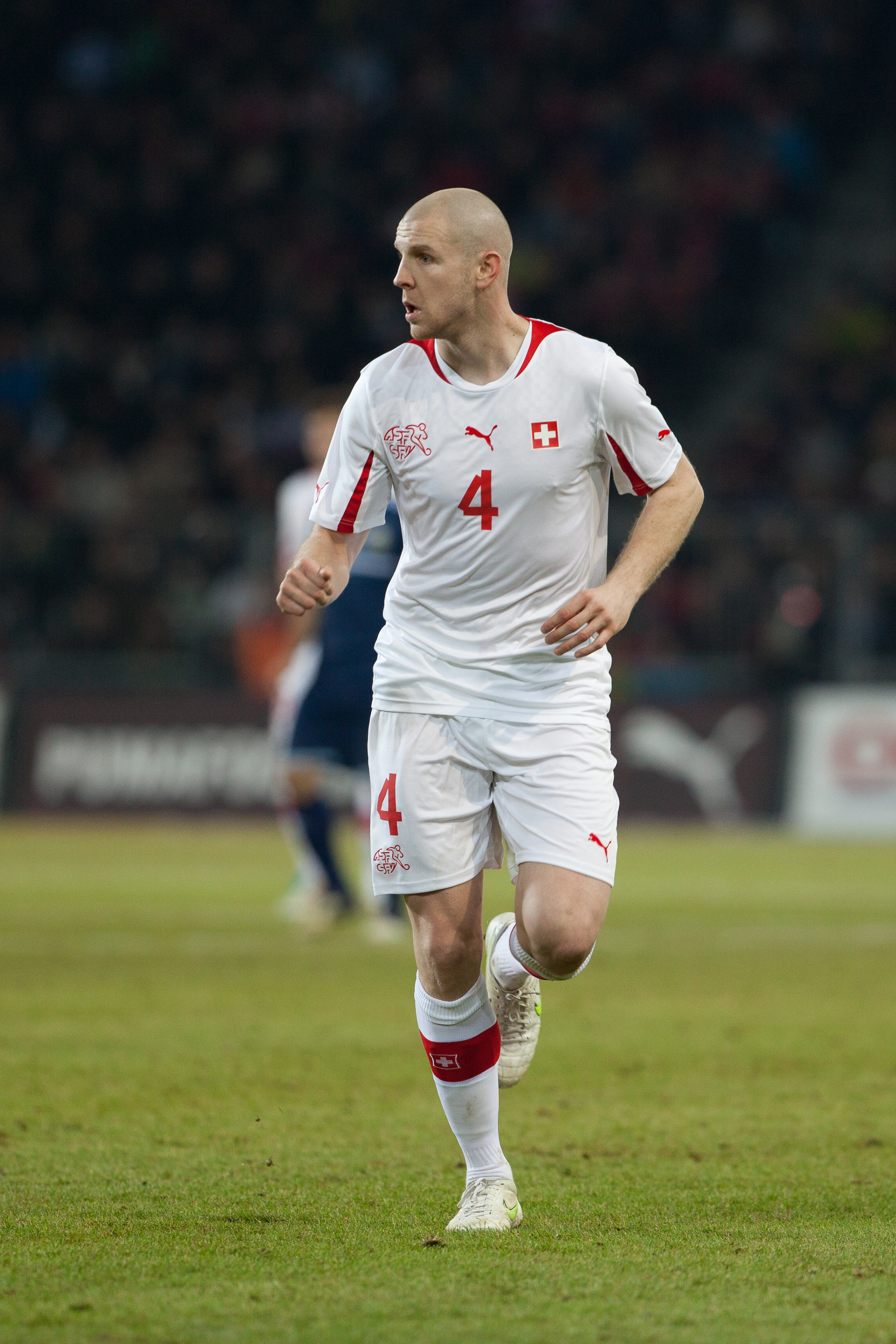
Senderos in action for Switzerland in 2012 in a match against Argentina

Senderos is a former youth international and has played at all levels of football from the under-15s upward for Switzerland, though he was also eligible to play for Spain or Serbia through his parents. He was captain of the Swiss under-17 squad that won the 2002 UEFA European Under-17 Championship.

Senderos made his full international debut on 26 March 2005 in Switzerland's 0–0 draw against France in Paris. On his fifth cap, away to Cyprus on 7 September 2005, he scored his first international goal by opening a 3–1 win. On 12 November 2005, he opened the scoring in Switzerland's win over Turkey in the play-offs. After playing in Switzerland's successful qualifying campaign, he was named in their 2006 FIFA World Cup squad. He started alongside Patrick Müller in all three of Switzerland's group matches, and scored the first goal of the 2–0 win in the third match, against South Korea. He broke his nose and suffered shoulder ligament damage in the match, which ruled him out of the remainder of Switzerland's World Cup campaign.

Senderos captained Switzerland for the first time on 6 February 2008, a 2–1 friendly defeat away to England in which he was substituted after 55 minutes for Stéphane Grichting. Senderos was also part of the Swiss squad at the UEFA Euro 2008 finals, appearing in all three group matches as the team failed to qualify for the knockout stages.

Senderos scored a brace in a 3–0 win away against Luxembourg in a 2010 World Cup qualifier on 10 October 2009, and was selected in the Swiss final squad for the 2010 World Cup. In the first match, where Switzerland shocked Spain 1–0, he was substituted in the 36th minute after injuring his ankle seriously in an accidental collision with teammate Stephan Lichtsteiner. Swiss head coach Ottmar Hitzfeld said after the match, "He has a sprained ankle, possibly a ruptured ligament. If that is the case, it would be very difficult to replace him."

Senderos was also chosen in the Swiss squad for the 2014 World Cup, his third World Cup. He made his first appearance in the second match, against France on 20 June 2014, replacing the injured Steve von Bergen after nine minutes, as Switzerland lost 5–2.

Senderos was omitted from the Switzerland squad for Euro 2016.

== Personal life ==
Philippe Senderos is the son of Serbian Orthodox mother Zorica Novković and Spanish Catholic father Julián Senderos. His brother Julien was a professional basketball player until 2011. On 20 July 2009, Senderos married Sara, an English woman of Iranian descent. Senderos speaks seven languages: English, French, Serbian, Spanish, German, Italian and Persian.

In 2012, Senderos was the victim of issued fake news from Turkey and Iran claiming that he had converted to Islam; he responded "That's not true. And I don't know where these rumours could have come from. I did a photo once [the one used by the websites] but that's all".

== Career statistics ==
=== Club ===
As of match played 16 December 2019

Appearances and goals by club, season and competition
Club	Season	League			National cup (Note: Includes Swiss Cup, FA Cup, Coppa Italia, Copa del Rey, Scottish Cup, US Open Cup)		League cup (Note: Includes EFL Cup, Scottish League Cup)		Continental		Other		Total	
Club	Season	Division	Apps	Goals	Apps	Goals	Apps	Goals	Apps	Goals	Apps	Goals	Apps	Goals
Servette	2001–02	Nationalliga A	3	0	0	0	–		0	0	–		3	0
Servette	2002–03	Nationalliga A	23	3	0	0	–		0	0	–		23	3
Servette	Total		26	3	0	0	–		0	0	–		26	3
Arsenal	2003–04	Premier League	0	0	0	0	0	0	0	0	0	0	0	0
Arsenal	2004–05	Premier League	13	0	6	0	3	0	0	0	0	0	22	0
Arsenal	2005–06	Premier League	20	2	2	0	5	0	7 (Note: Appearances in UEFA Champions League)	0	1 (Note: Appearance in FA Community Shield)	0	35	2
Arsenal	2006–07	Premier League	14	0	4	0	5	0	2	0	–		25	0
Arsenal	2007–08	Premier League	17	2	3	0	3	0	9	0	–		32	2
Arsenal	2008–09	Premier League	0	0	0	0	0	0	0	0	–		0	0
Arsenal	2009–10	Premier League	0	0	0	0	2	0	0	0	–		2	0
Arsenal	Total		64	4	15	0	18	0	18	0	1	0	116	4
Milan (loan)	2008–09	Serie A	14	0	0	0	–		5 (Note: Appearances in UEFA Cup)	0	–		19	0
Everton (loan)	2009–10	Premier League	2	0	0	0	0	0	1 (Note: Appearance(s) in UEFA Europa League)	0	–		3	0
Fulham	2010–11	Premier League	3	0	0	0	0	0	–		–		3	0
Fulham	2011–12	Premier League	21	1	1	0	1	0	5	0	–		28	1
Fulham	2012–13	Premier League	21	0	1	0	0	0	–		–		22	0
Fulham	2013–14	Premier League	12	1	1	0	2	0	–		–		15	1
Fulham	Total		57	2	3	0	3	0	5	0	–		68	2
Valencia	2013–14	La Liga	8	0	0	0	–		3	1	–		11	1
Aston Villa	2014–15	Premier League	8	0	0	0	1	0	–		–		9	0
Aston Villa	2015–16	Premier League	0	0	0	0	0	0	–		–		0	0
Aston Villa	Total		8	0	0	0	1	0	–		–		9	0
Grasshoppers	2015–16	Swiss Super League	14	0	0	0	–		–		–		14	0
Rangers	2016–17	Scottish Premiership	3	0	1	0	0	0	–		–		4	0
Houston Dynamo	2017	Major League Soccer	2	0	0	0	–		–		4 (Note: Appearances in MLS Cup Playoffs)	0	6	0
Houston Dynamo	2018	Major League Soccer	8	4	5	0	–		–		–		13	4
Houston Dynamo	Total		10	4	5	0	–		–		4	0	19	4
Chiasso	2019–20	Swiss Challenge League	3	0	0	0	–		–		–		3	0
Career total			210	13	24	0	22	0	32	1	5	0	293	14

=== International ===
As of match played 28 May 2016

National team	Year	Apps	Goals
Switzerland	2005	9	2
Switzerland	2006	7	1
Switzerland	2007	8	0
Switzerland	2008	7	0
Switzerland	2009	7	2
Switzerland	2010	3	0
Switzerland	2011	3	0
Switzerland	2012	3	0
Switzerland	2013	5	0
Switzerland	2014	3	0
Switzerland	2016	2	0
Total		57	5

International goals
Scores and results list Switzerland's goal tally first.

#	Date	Venue	Opponent	Score	Result	Competition
1.	29 February 2005	GSP Stadium, Nicosia	Cyprus	1–0	3–1	2006 FIFA World Cup qualification
2.	12 November 2005	Stade de Suisse, Bern	Turkey	1–0	2–0	2006 FIFA World Cup qualification
3.	23 June 2006	AWD Arena, Hannover	South Korea	1–0	2–0	2006 FIFA World Cup
4.	10 October 2009	Stade Josy Barthel, Luxembourg	Luxembourg	1–0	3–0	2010 FIFA World Cup qualification – UEFA Group 2
5.	10 October 2009	Stade Josy Barthel, Luxembourg	Luxembourg	2–0	3–0	2010 FIFA World Cup qualification – UEFA Group 2

== Honours ==
Arsenal

- FA Cup: 2004–05
- FA Community Shield: 2004
- Football League Cup runner-up 2006–07
- UEFA Champions League runner-up: 2005–06

Houston Dynamo

- U.S. Open Cup: 2018

Switzerland U17

- UEFA European Under-17 Championship: 2002

Individual

- Credit Suisse Player of the Year: 2006
