= Choisy-le-Roi =

- Commune
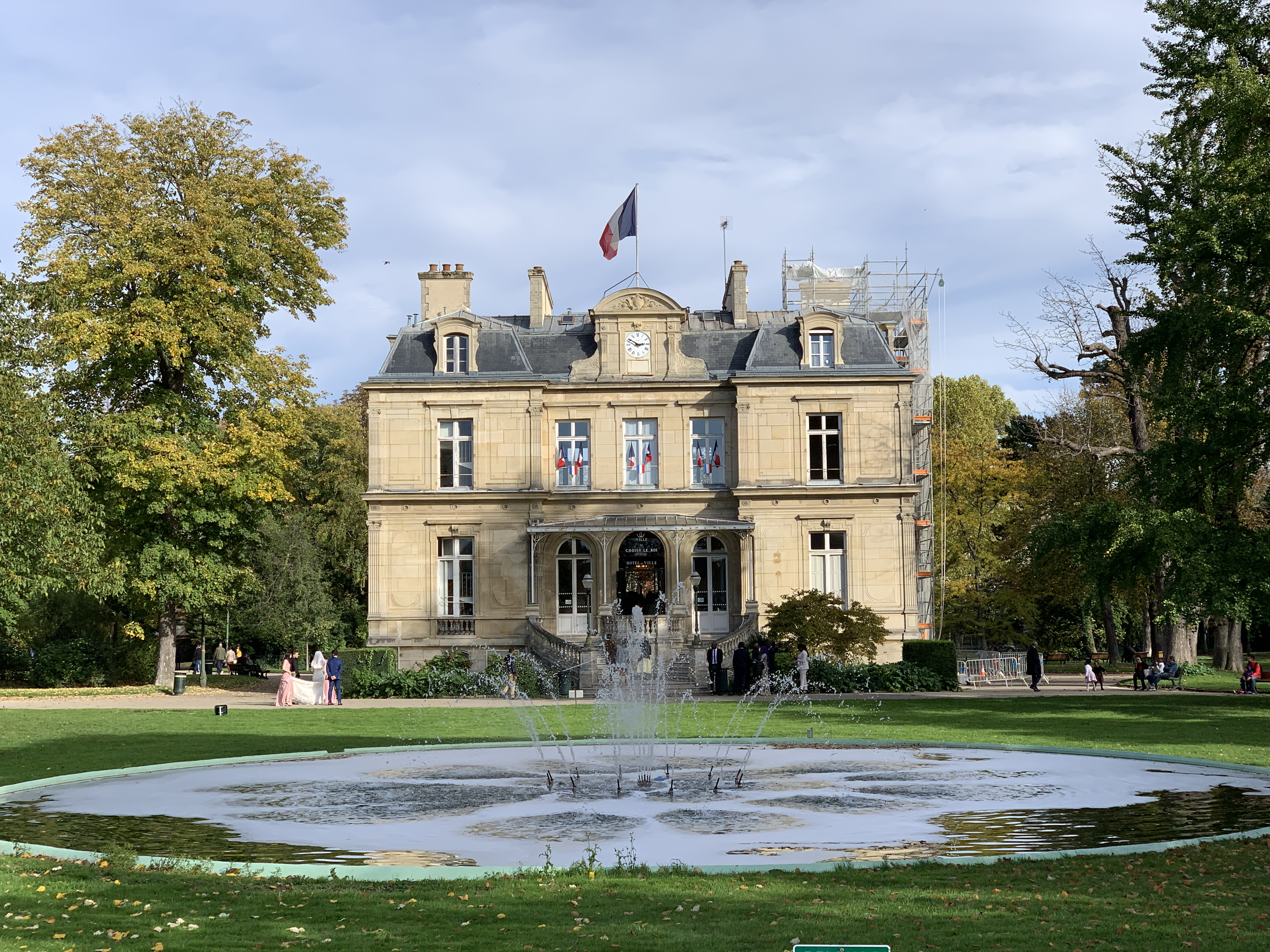
- The former Hôtel de Ville

- Coat of arms

- Location (in red) within Paris inner suburbs
- Location of Choisy-le-Roi
- Location within France Location within Île-de-France (region)
- Coordinates: 48°45′47″N 2°24′32″E
- Country: France
- Region: Île-de-France
- Department: Val-de-Marne
- Arrondissement: L'Haÿ-les-Roses
- Canton: Choisy-le-Roi
- Intercommunality: Grand Paris

Government
  - Mayor (2026–32): Tonino Panetta
- Area^{1}: 5.43 km^{2} (2.10 sq mi)
- Elevation: 40 m (130 ft)
- Highest elevation: 49 m (161 ft)
- Lowest elevation: 31 m (102 ft)
- Population (2023): 45,946
  - Density: 8,460/km^{2} (21,900/sq mi)
- Demonym: Choisyens
- Time zone: UTC+01:00 (CET)
  - Summer (DST): UTC+02:00 (CEST)
- INSEE/Postal code: 94022 /94600
- Website: www.choisyleroi.fr
- ^{1} French Land Register data, which excludes lakes, ponds, glaciers > 1 km^{2} (0.386 sq mi or 247 acres) and river estuaries.

Choisy-le-Roi (French pronunciation: [ʃwazi lə ʁwa]; lit. 'Choisy-the-King') is a commune in the Val-de-Marne department, in the southeastern suburbs of Paris, France.

== Toponymy ==
The name Choisy-le-Roi comes from the Latin Sociusacum, meaning “the estate of Socius,” a Gallo-Roman landowner. The suffix -le-Roi (“the King”) was added in 1739, when Louis XV purchased the Château de Choisy and made it part of his royal domain.

== History ==
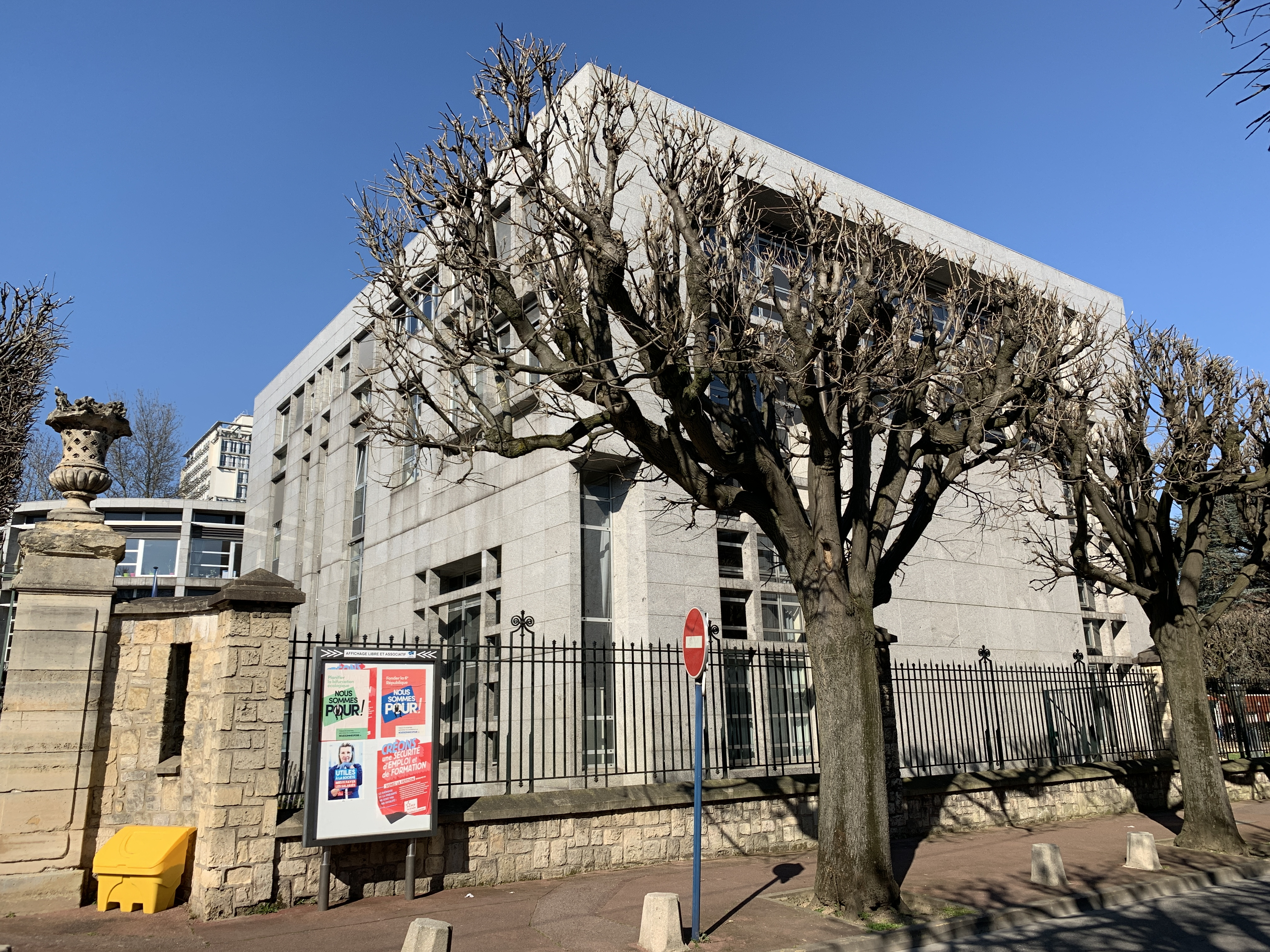
The Hôtel de Ville

The current Hôtel de Ville was completed in 1988.

== Geography ==
Choisy-le-Roi is located 10.7 km (6.6 mi) southeast from the center of Paris, on both banks of the river Seine. The neighbouring communes are, from the north and clockwise: Vitry-sur-Seine, Alfortville, Créteil, Valenton, Villeneuve-Saint-Georges, Orly and Thiais.

=== Climate ===
Choisy-le-Roi has an oceanic climate (Köppen climate classification Cfb). The average annual temperature in Choisy-le-Roi is 12.7 °C (54.9 °F). The average annual rainfall is 607.2 mm (23.91 in) with December as the wettest month. The temperatures are highest on average in July, at around 21.0 °C (69.8 °F), and lowest in January, at around 5.3 °C (41.5 °F). The highest temperature ever recorded in Choisy-le-Roi was 41.7 °C (107.1 °F) on 25 July 2019; the coldest temperature ever recorded was −11.5 °C (11.3 °F) on 1 January 1997.

Climate data for Choisy-le-Roi (1991−2020 normals, extremes 1988−2021)
Month	Jan	Feb	Mar	Apr	May	Jun	Jul	Aug	Sep	Oct	Nov	Dec	Year
Record high °C (°F)	16.0 (60.8)	21.2 (70.2)	26.2 (79.2)	29.6 (85.3)	33.3 (91.9)	37.5 (99.5)	41.7 (107.1)	40.5 (104.9)	35.3 (95.5)	28.9 (84.0)	21.0 (69.8)	17.0 (62.6)	41.7 (107.1)
Mean daily maximum °C (°F)	7.7 (45.9)	8.9 (48.0)	12.8 (55.0)	16.9 (62.4)	20.5 (68.9)	23.8 (74.8)	26.2 (79.2)	26.2 (79.2)	21.9 (71.4)	16.6 (61.9)	11.1 (52.0)	8.1 (46.6)	16.7 (62.1)
Daily mean °C (°F)	5.3 (41.5)	5.8 (42.4)	8.8 (47.8)	12.1 (53.8)	15.6 (60.1)	18.9 (66.0)	21.0 (69.8)	20.9 (69.6)	17.2 (63.0)	12.9 (55.2)	8.4 (47.1)	5.7 (42.3)	12.7 (54.9)
Mean daily minimum °C (°F)	2.8 (37.0)	2.7 (36.9)	4.8 (40.6)	7.3 (45.1)	10.7 (51.3)	13.9 (57.0)	15.8 (60.4)	15.6 (60.1)	12.5 (54.5)	9.2 (48.6)	5.6 (42.1)	3.3 (37.9)	8.7 (47.7)
Record low °C (°F)	−11.5 (11.3)	−9.5 (14.9)	−7.0 (19.4)	−1.0 (30.2)	1.0 (33.8)	6.0 (42.8)	8.0 (46.4)	7.5 (45.5)	4.0 (39.2)	−1.0 (30.2)	−7.0 (19.4)	−8.0 (17.6)	−11.5 (11.3)
Average precipitation mm (inches)	49.5 (1.95)	43.3 (1.70)	43.3 (1.70)	44.7 (1.76)	58.6 (2.31)	54.5 (2.15)	53.0 (2.09)	52.5 (2.07)	43.2 (1.70)	51.6 (2.03)	52.7 (2.07)	60.3 (2.37)	607.2 (23.91)
Average precipitation days (≥ 1.0 mm)	10.8	9.6	9.7	8.6	9.2	8.4	7.4	7.6	7.5	9.7	10.9	12.1	111.3
Source: Météo-France

== Population ==
Historical population

Year	Pop.	±% p.a.
1793	1,150	—
1800	990	−2.12%
1806	1,383	+5.73%
1821	1,320	−0.31%
1831	3,055	+8.75%
1836	3,110	+0.36%
1841	3,119	+0.06%
1846	3,612	+2.98%
1851	3,271	−1.96%
1856	3,907	+3.62%
1861	4,648	+3.53%
1866	5,172	+2.16%
1872	5,099	−0.24%
1876	5,821	+3.37%
1881	6,978	+3.69%
1886	7,853	+2.39%
1891	8,449	+1.47%
1896	9,909	+3.24%
1901	11,607	+3.21%

Year	Pop.	±% p.a.
1906	13,067	+2.40%
1911	15,908	+4.01%
1921	20,309	+2.47%
1926	23,634	+3.08%
1931	27,584	+3.14%
1936	28,476	+0.64%
1946	27,333	−0.41%
1954	31,789	+1.91%
1962	41,522	+3.40%
1968	41,440	−0.03%
1975	38,705	−0.97%
1982	35,476	−1.24%
1990	34,068	−0.50%
1999	34,336	+0.09%
2007	37,165	+0.99%
2012	41,507	+2.23%
2017	45,331	+1.78%
2023	45,946	+0.22%

Source: EHESS and INSEE (1968-2023)

== Transport ==
Choisy-le-Roi is served by Choisy-le-Roi station on Paris RER line C. It is also served by Créteil-Pompadour station on Paris RER line D.

== Education ==
Public schools include:

- Preschools (maternelles): Marcel Cachin, Danièle Casanova, Eugénie Cotton, du Centre – Auguste Blanqui, du Parc – Armand Noblet, Victor Hugo, Paul Langevin, Henri Wallon
- Elementary schools: Marcel Cachin, Jean Macé, du Centre – Auguste Blanqui, du Parc- Armand Noblet, Victor Hugo, Joliot Curie, Paul Langevin, Nelson Mandela
- Junior high schools (collèges): Émile Zola, Jules Vallès, Henri Matisse, College Paul Klee.
- Senior high schools: Lycée Professionnel Jean Macé Choisy-le-Roi, Lycée des métiers Jacques Brel

There is a private school serving elementary to senior high school, groupe scolaire Saint André Choisy-le-Roi.

== Personalities ==
- Louise Bourgeois, artist
- Philippe Di Folco, writer
- Yves Pires, artist
- Zainoul Bah, basketball player
- Davy Dona, karateka
- Jeremy Nzeulie, basketball player
- Madimoussa Traore, footballer
- Suzanne Chaisemartin (1921–2017), organist was born in Choisy-le-Roy
- Hugo Valente, racing driver

== International relations ==
Choisy-le-Roi is twinned with:

- Đống Đa (Hanoi), Vietnam
- Hennigsdorf, Germany
- Lugo, Italy
- Târnova, Romania

== See also ==
- Communes of the Val-de-Marne department
