= Madimoussa Traoré =

French footballer (born 1986)

Personal information
- Date of birth: 11 June 1986 (age 40)
- Place of birth: Choisy-le-Roi, France
- Height: 1.84 m (6 ft 0 in)
- Position: Striker

Youth career
- 2002–2003: Sedan
- 2003–2005: Bordeaux

Senior career*
| Years | Team | Apps | (Gls) |
| 2005–2006 | Bordeaux | 1 | (0) |
| 2006–2007 | Gazélec Ajaccio | 28 | (14) |
| 2007–2009 | Le Mans | 0 | (0) |
| 2009–2010 | Gazélec Ajaccio | 23 | (9) |
| 2010–2015 | CA Bastia | 87 | (22) |
| 2015–2016 | AJ Biguglia | | |
| 2016–2017 | ÉF Bastia | 10 | (1) |
- * Club domestic league appearances and goals

Madimoussa Traoré (born 11 June 1986) is a French former professional footballer who played as a striker. He made one Ligue 1 appearance for Bordeaux.
