= Julien Senderos =

Swiss basketball player

Juliene Senderos
Personal information
- Born: 18 September 1980 (age 46) Meyrin, Switzerland
- Listed height: 6 ft 6 in (1.98 m)
- Listed weight: 215 lb (98 kg)

Career information
- Playing career: 2001–present
- Position: Forward

Career history
- 2002–2003: Geneva Devils
- 2003–2005: Meyrin Grand-Saconnex Basket
- 2005–2006: Jovent de Alaior
- 2006: Meyrin Grand-Saconnex Basket
- 2006–2007: Geneva Devils
- 2007–2009: Meyrin Grand-Saconnex Basket
- 2009–2010: Lausanne Basket
- 2010–2011: BBC Nyon

Julien Senderos (born 18 September 1980) is a Swiss retired basketball player who last played for BBC Nyon.

== Biography ==
=== Professional career ===
He began his career as a professional basketball player 2002 for the Geneva Devils in the Ligue Nationale de Basketball. He played streetball in Calafell, Spain over the summer holiday.

On 24 September 2010, Senderos signed for Swiss club Sdent BBC Nyon.

=== International career ===
Senderos was 2007 member of the Swiss national team.

== Personal life ==
Julien is the brother of the former Arsenal football player Philippe Senderos, who has also represented Switzerland at national level.
