= Zaïnoul Bah =

Ivorian-French basketball player

Personal information
- Born: 24 April 1984 (age 42) Choisy-le-Roi, France
- Listed height: 185 cm (6 ft 1 in)
- Listed weight: 84 kg (185 lb)

Career information
- Playing career: 2002–2017
- Position: Shooting guard
- Number: 5

Career history
- 2002–2003: Limoges
- 2005–2006: Orléans Loiret
- 2006–2008: Lugano Tigers
- 2008–2009: BBC Nyon
- 2009–2010: Saint-Étienne Basket
- 2010: Poly-Rapid Zurich Wildcats
- 2010–2011: Fos
- 2011–2013: SOMB
- 2013–2014: Antibes Sharks
- 2014–2016: Saint-Quentin
- 2016–2017: Pfastatt

Zaïnoul Bah (born 24 April 1984) is an Ivorian-French former basketball player. Bah had a long professional career, playing for clubs in France and Switzerland. Standing at 1.83 m (6 ft 0 in), he primarily played as shooting guard.
