= Hôtel de Ville, Choisy-le-Roi =

Town hall in Choisy-le-Roi, France

Hôtel de Ville
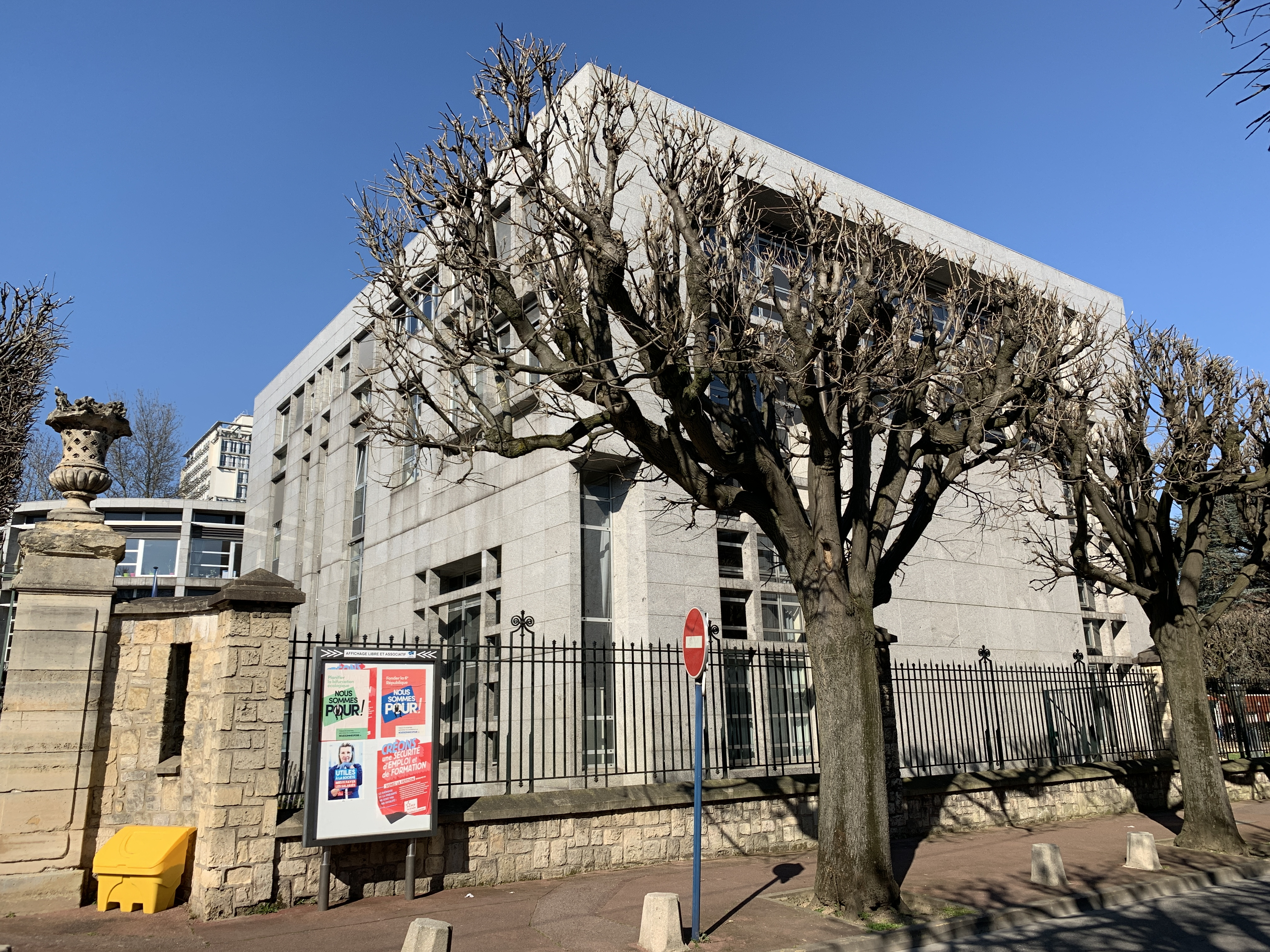
- The Hôtel de Ville in March 2021
- Interactive map of the Hôtel de Ville area

General information
- Type: City hall
- Architectural style: Modern style
- Location: Choisy-le-Roi, France
- Coordinates: 48.7623°N 2.4096°E
- Completed: 1988

Design and construction
- Architect: Pierre Soria

The Hôtel de Ville (French pronunciation: [otɛl də vil], City Hall) is a municipal building in Choisy-le-Roi, Val-de-Marne in the southern suburbs of Paris, standing on Rue Waldeck Rousseau.

== History ==
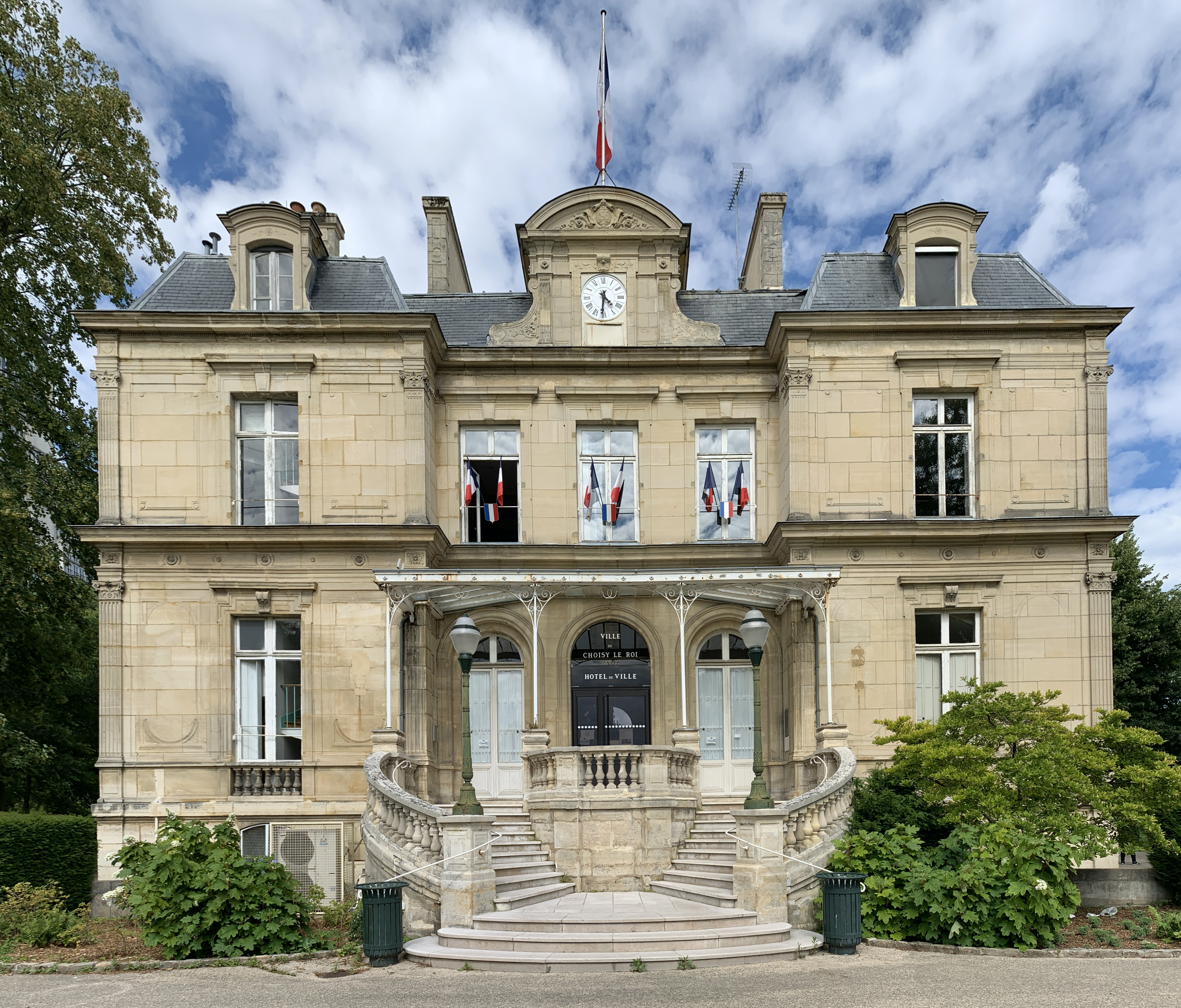
The old town hall

Following the French Revolution, the town council established its offices in a building behind the Church of Saint-Louis. Known as the Portail du Roi (King's Gate), this was where the royal family attended mass on Sundays. This arrangement continued until the early 20th century when the council led by the mayor, Laurent Augustin Rondu, decided to acquire a more substantial building. The building they selected was a house in the centre of a park created following the demolition of the Château de Choisy, which had once been owned by Louis XV but, after falling into decay, was demolished to facilitate the construction of the Paris to Orléans Railway in 1840.

The southern part of the park was acquired by a local ironmaster, Jules Mathieu Lagoutte, who went on to be the local mayor, and who commissioned a house there in the mid-19th century. It was designed in the neoclassical style, built in ashlar stone and was completed in 1853. The design involved a symmetrical main frontage of five bays with the outer bays projected forward as pavilions. The central section of three bays featured a forestair leading up to three round headed doorways. There were three casement windows with cornices on the first floor and, above the central bay, there was a clock flanked by pilasters supporting a segmental pediment. The outer bays were fenestrated by casement windows with cornices on the first two floors and by dormer windows at attic level. After Lagoutte died in 1899, his heiress, Madame Puech, divided the property up and sold the house to the town council in 1903. The new town hall, and the landscaped municipal space around it, was officially opened on 2 July 1905.

On 17 August 1944, during the Second World War, the town hall was seized by the French Forces of the Interior who installed a liberation committee there. The committee dispatched a team of 13 members of the French Forces of Interior to guard a local depot operated by the National Socialist Motor Corps: the whole team were apprehended and executed by German troops on 21 August 1944. This was four days in advance of the official liberation of the town by the French 2nd Armoured Division, commanded by General Philippe Leclerc, on 25 August 1944.

In the early 1980s, the council led by the mayor, Louis Luc, decided to commission a modern town hall. The site they selected was on the southern side of the park. Construction work on the new building started in December 1986. It was designed by Pierre Soria in the modern style, built in aluminium, granite and glass and was officially opened on 4 June 1988. It was laid out in two parts, a square shaped building adjacent to Rue Waldeck Rousseau and an oblong building, curved at the southwest corner, behind it. Internally, the principal room was the Salle du Conseil (council chamber), which featured a sculpture by the artist, Jean-Robert Ipoustéguy, entitled Les nourritures publiques (public foods).
