= Château de Choisy =

Demolished French royal residence

Coordinates: 48.7629°N 2.4088°E

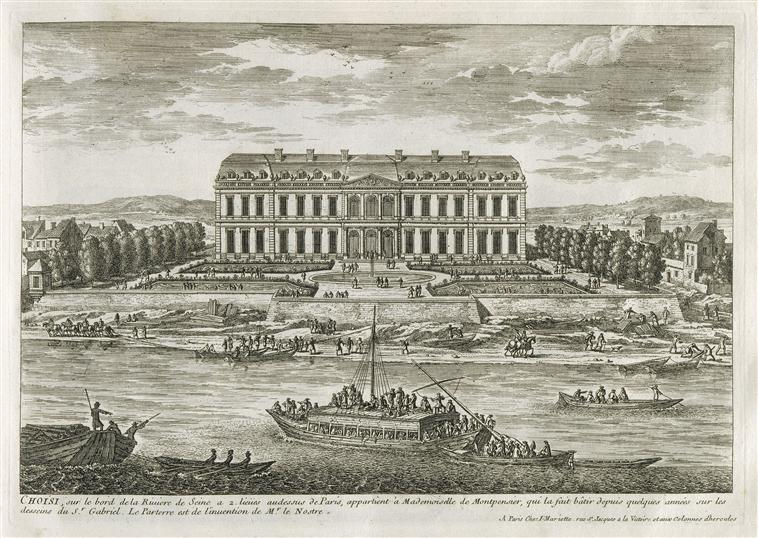
The château at the time of la Grande Mademoiselle

The Château de Choisy was a royal French residence in the commune of Choisy-le-Roi in the Val-de-Marne department, not far from Paris. The commune was given its present name by Louis XV, when he purchased the manor of Choisy and its château in October 1739.

== The Château of La Grande Mademoiselle ==
The site had been purchased well before 1680 by Louis XIV's first cousin Anne Marie Louise d'Orléans, Duchess of Montpensier, "La Grande Mademoiselle". She laid out 40,000 livres for the property, and swept away an existing corps de logis, according to her Mémoires, and had a new house built to plans of Jacques Gabriel—"who made my house to my fashion" Mlle Montpensier noted, "without any ornament or 'architecture'" an assertion that overlooked sculptural enrichments in the pediment, by Étienne Le Hongre.

The Château de Choisy was set in an elaborate series of gardens laid out by André Le Nôtre. He was called in before the few existing buildings were swept away and found the site too closed in by dense woodlands: "There one only saw the riverbank as if through a dormer window," he told the king—who passed on the remark— and advised Mlle de Montpensier to begin in this "vilaine situation" by "laying low all the woods that were there". The view of the river was the main thing, and Mlle de Montpensier calculated it to advantage: "As I had my house built in order to go there in summer, I took measures in order that one might see the river in the time of year when it is at its lowest; from my bed I see it and all the boats that pass."

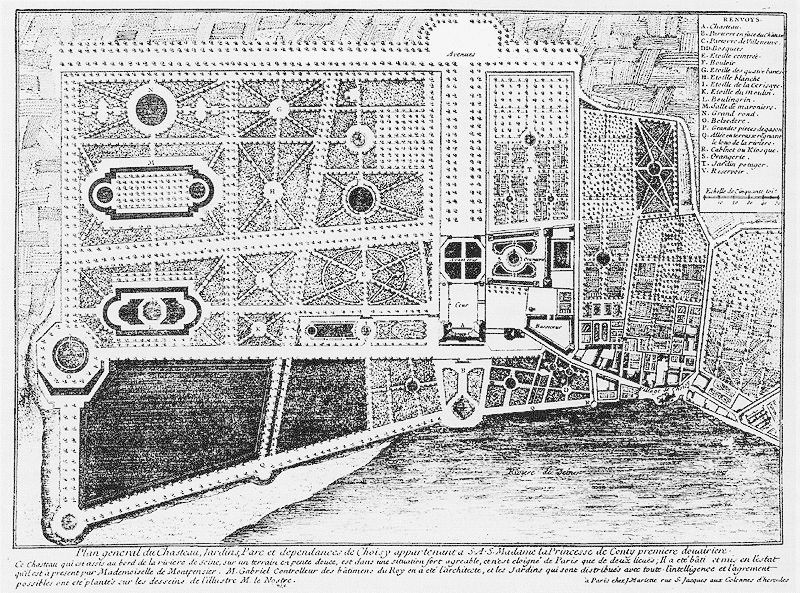
The gardens of Choisy, left as André Le Nôtre had developed them, during the occupation of the princesse de Conti.

The lost château is known today through engravings by Pierre-Jean Mariette, Gabriel Perelle and Pierre Aveline. Its interiors were well described in the Grande Mademoiselle's Mémoires.

The château passed in 1693 to le Grand Dauphin, who had some interior modifications executed (Kimball 1943 p 51) before exchanging it in 1695 for Meudon, more accessible from Versailles.

== Reign of Louis XV ==
In 1716, it was sold to Marie Anne de Bourbon (1666–1739), dowager princess de Conti, the legitimised daughter of Louis XIV and Louise de la Vallière. On her death in 1739 it was sold to the king, by then Louis XV.

In spite of the loss of the immediately surrounding woods in favor of parterres with the Seine as backdrop and bosquets punctuated by statuary, the hunting was good in the neighboring forest of Sénart, the king's original motivation for purchasing Choisy. The king enlarged the château from 1740 onwards, under the direction of Ange-Jacques Gabriel, premier architecte du Roi. He was able to use Choisy by 1741. The central block was doubled in depth in the modern way; a theatre was added and the stables were greatly enlarged; Mlle de Montpesier's belle orangerie was rebuilt and in its central salon Edmé Bouchardon's Love shaping his bow from the club of Hercules was installed in 1752. A bathing pavilion was added, and above all a Petit Château (illustration, right) was designed to provide an intimate refuge for Louis XV and Madame de Pompadour. Works continued in a series of campaigns as late as 1777, though Louis XV lost interest in Choisy after Pompadour's death, but there is precious little documentation of the interiors, save a section by Gabriel, dated 1754, of the circular Salon and Vestibule in the Pavillon Particulier du Roi, the Petit Château: "it shows a sober character' Fiske Kimball reported: 'the overdoor is an unbroken oval crowned with shellwork and scrolls, but draped...with the newly fashionable garland of husks" (Kimball p 207).

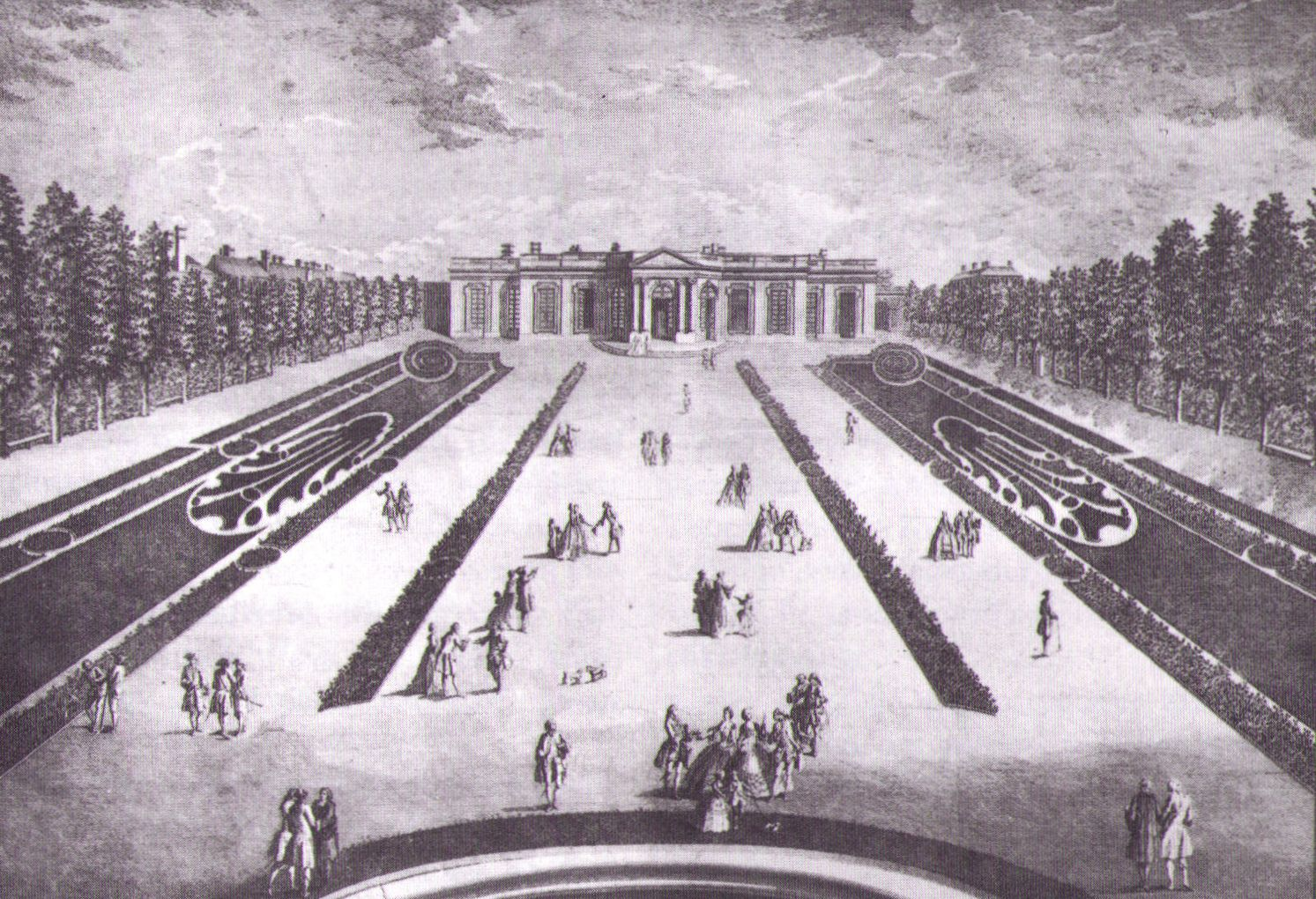
Gabriel's Petit Château

The furnishings of Choisy were intentionally kept simple. The King's writing table for his use at Choisy, delivered by royal ébéniste Antoine Gaudreau in 1744 though it bears gilt-bronze mounts, is no grander than the writing tables of many a contemporaneous aristocrat. Chardin provided emblematic still lives free of rhetoric or pomp, as overdoors for an unidentified room, in 1765. Lambert Sigisbert Adam was less than lucky, however, with his marble bust of Louis XV as Apollo, dated 1749, which Adam had shown at the Salon of 1745 and which, on his own initiative, he placed in the Galerie at Choisy, which was to be decorated by Charles Parrocel with a series of decorative Conquests of Louis XV. The project, perhaps too grandiose for the royal retreat, came to nothing, and Adam overreached himself in asking 7000 louis for the bust; the king's reaction in September 1762 was that he did not want to see it at Choisy on his next visit and that Adam should pack it up and remove it.

The surrounding parish received an influx of business due to the royal presence, and a new parish church. For fêtes on the river at Choisy, the king had gondolas imported from Venice.

== Later history ==
After the king's death, Marie Antoinette came often to Choisy, though at the time of the purchase of the Château de Saint-Cloud from the House of Orléans, it was briefly suggested that Choisy be part of the exchange. Louis XV installed at Choisy the portrait he commissioned from Drouais of Marie Antoinette as Dauphine, in 1773 In 1777, when the Queen wished to build at Versailles a little theatre for private performances in which she joined, she instructed the architect Richard Mique to take for his model the theatre at Choisy built by Gabriel for Mme de Pompadour; as a result, the Théâtre de la Reine, finished in 1779, though it is modest and fully Neoclassical on the outside, has an interior unexpectedly rococo for its date.

The château and the petit château were royal residences; thus at the Revolution, when the commune became Choisy-sur-Seine, the château was confiscated as a bien national, emptied of its contents at auctions (part of the Revolutionary sales), its terrains divided into individual lots and sold. The buildings fell into disrepair and were demolished bit by bit during the nineteenth century. Today all that remains are a dry ditch and ha-ha and two pavilions flanking the former cour d'honneur, and a range of the former service wing. The site is now occupied by the old town hall of Choisy-le-Roi.
