= Agoard and Aglibert =

Martyrs at Créteil, Paris, France

Saints Agoard and Aglibert Martyrs
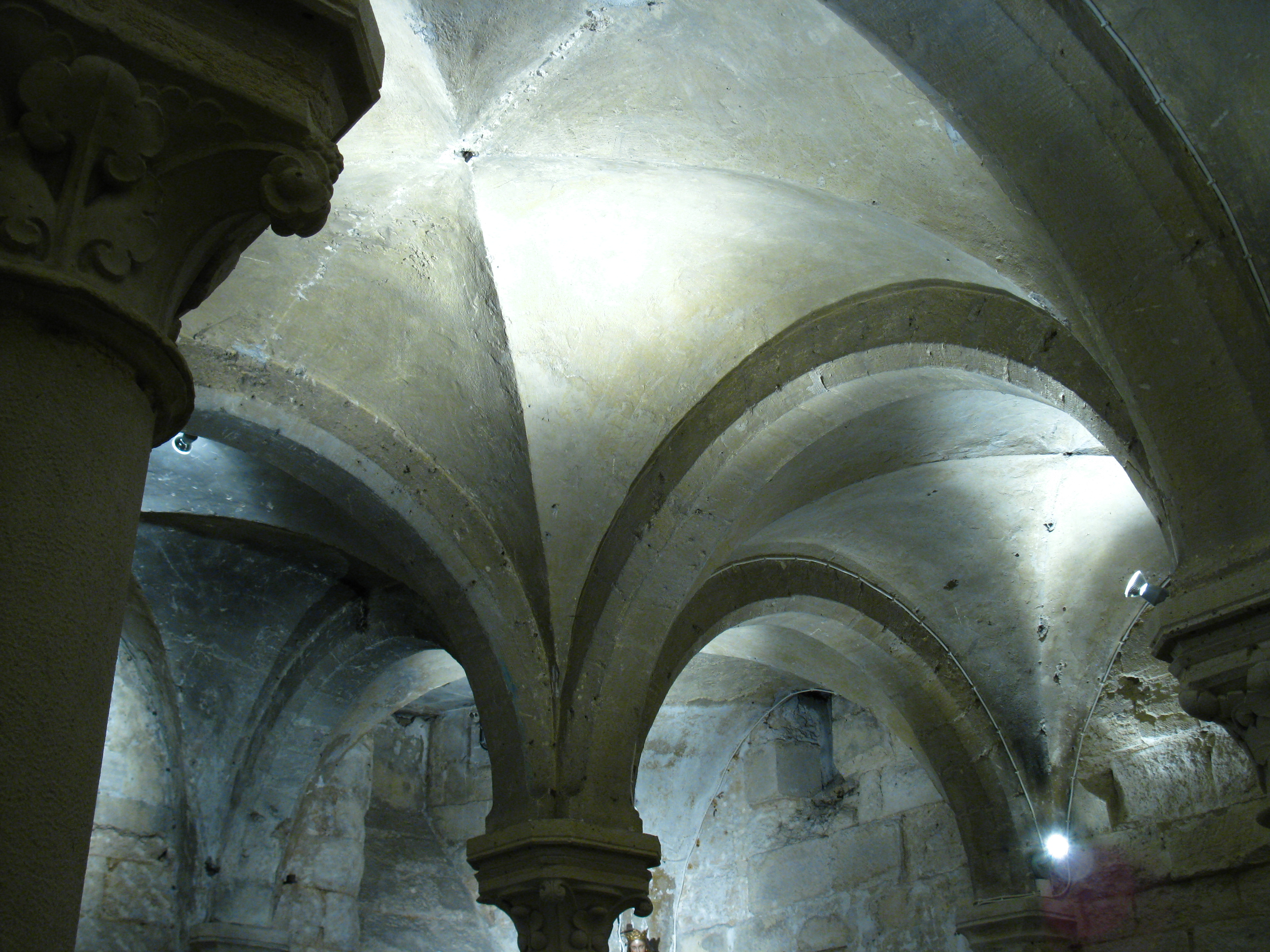
- Crypt of the Church of Saint-Christophe de Créteil
- Died: c. 400; Créteil, Paris, France
- Feast: 24 June

Agoard and Aglibert were martyrs at Créteil, Paris, France, around 400 AD. Other sources say their martyrdom was in the 7th or 8th century. Saint Agoard and Saint Aglibert are celebrated locally on 24 June.

== Relics ==
The relics of Saint Agoard and Saint Aglibert are kept in an old metal reliquary in the crypt of the Saint-Christophe Church, Créteil. Henry Lerolle painted a fresco in this church in 1874, that represents the martyrs. At the beginning of the 20th century, a cross still marked the place that tradition held to be the place of martyrdom.

== Usuard's account ==
The hagiographic legend of "Saint Agoard" is found in the martyrology of the Benedictine monk Usuard from around 865. This text is questioned today by historians who qualify it as an "incoherent assemblage". It states that Agoard resided in Créteil near Paris. He was massacred around the year 400 with his family and friends, including Saint Aglibert.

== Ramsgate account ==
The monks of St Augustine's Abbey, Ramsgate wrote in their Book of Saints (1921),

AGOARDUS, AGLIBERTUS and OTHERS (SS.) MM. (June 24)

(3rd century) A group of Martyrs described as having been so numerous as to defy counting. They appear to have been massacred in a popular outbreak against the Christians, at Creteil, near Paris. The tradition is that SS. Agoardus and Aglibert, their leaders, had come from the Rhine country, and that SS. Ewaldus, Altinus and Savinian had converted them to Christianity. The details concerning these Martyrs, now available, are very untrustworthy; and the dates given still more so. But A.D. 273 seems likely as the year of their triumph.

== Butler's account ==
The hagiographer Alban Butler wrote in his Lives of the Primitive Fathers, Martyrs, and Other Principal Saints (1799),

SS. Agoard and Aglibert, MM. in the Diocese of Paris

They were strangers who came originally from the borders of the Rhine, but were settled in the neighbourhood of Paris at Creteil, a village two leagues from that city. They were converted to the faith by the apostolic preachers Altin and Eoald, together with many others. Having by common consent pulled down a heathenish temple, they were put to the sword with a troop of holy companions, by an order of a heathenish governor; or, according to Baillet, by the Vandals, about the year 400. A church was afterwards erected over the place of their burial. Their relics are now enshrined in the same. Their festival is marked in Martyrologies on the 24th, but kept at Cretail and in the whole diocess of Paris on the 25th of June. See the new Paris breviary, Baillet, Le Boeuf, &c.

== Sources ==
- Alban Butler (1799), The Lives of the Primitive Fathers, Martyrs, and Other Principal Saints... by the Rev. Alban Butler..., J. Moir This article incorporates text from this source, which is in the public domain.
- Commission d’Art sacré (November 2005), "Revue de la Commission d'Art sacré", Mensuel (in French), Diocèse des Créteil
- "Éphéméride du 24 juin", incapable.fr
- Mairie de Créteil. "Ville de Créteil - Histoire de la ville". www.ville-creteil.fr (in French).
- Notice archéologique de Créteil, General Council of Val-de-Marne
- "Saints Agoard et Aglibert". nominis.cef.fr.
- St. Augustine's Abbey, Ramsgate (1921), The Book of saints : a dictionary of servants of God canonized by the Catholic Church, London: A. & C. Black, ltd. This article incorporates text from this source, which is in the public domain.
