= 2013–14 Liverpool F.C. season =

English football club season

Liverpool
2013–14 season
- Owner: Fenway Sports Group
- Chairman: Tom Werner
- Manager: Brendan Rodgers
- Stadium: Anfield
- Premier League: 2nd
- FA Cup: Fifth round
- League Cup: Third round
- Top goalscorer: League: Luis Suárez (31); All: Luis Suárez (31)
- Highest home attendance: 44,822 vs. Stoke City (17 August 2013, Premier League)
- Average home league attendance: 44,671 (in Premier League)
Home colours	Away colours	Third colours

The 2013–14 season was Liverpool Football Club's 122nd season in existence and their 52nd consecutive season in the top flight of English football. This was also the club's 22nd consecutive season in the Premier League. Along with the Premier League, Liverpool also competed in the FA Cup and Football League Cup.

Liverpool enjoyed a memorable season, scoring 101 league goals; the highest number of goals scored by a Premier League runner-up, until 2020, when Manchester City scored 102 goals while finishing second. It is also the fifth highest number of goals ever scored in the Premier League.

Luis Suárez finished as the Premier League's top scorer with 31 goals, winning the Premier League Golden Boot as well as the PFA Players' Player of the Year, while Daniel Sturridge was the league's second highest scorer with 21. Steven Gerrard topped the official Premier League assists chart with 13.

Liverpool had a pre-season dominated by speculation about whether Luis Suárez would leave the club. Suárez had served four matches of a ten-match ban for biting Branislav Ivanović in the previous season, and Arsenal reportedly agreed terms and offered £40,000,001 for the player based on a rumoured £40 million release clause in Suárez's contract. Suárez stated he would like to leave the club and was then told to train away from the first-team squad. On 8 August, Liverpool owner John W. Henry stated that Suárez would not be allowed to leave the club.

A Simon Mignolet penalty save on the opening day gave Liverpool the first of three 1–0 victories to begin the season. A subsequent draw and loss saw Liverpool drop to fifth place on the table when Suárez completed his ban. From the next match until the end of the season, Liverpool would average 2.9 goals per game. They were top of the table at Christmas before back-to-back 2–1 defeats away at Manchester City and Chelsea. In that key Manchester City fixture, Raheem Sterling was onside by well over a metre but had his goal disallowed for offside in an "awful decision" that both BT Sport commentators called as onside immediately, saying "you could see it with your naked eye".

A 5–1 home win over then league-leaders Arsenal on 8 February featured four Liverpool goals in the opening 20 minutes. With a mid-week 90th-minute penalty at Fulham, Liverpool won again and the winning run would eventually extend to 11 games, included Liverpool defeating title rivals, Manchester City, on 13 April, in the same week as the 25th anniversary of the Hillsborough disaster. A subsequent mid-week Manchester City draw meant Liverpool would win the league if they got ten points from their remaining 4 games.

Their next match was a 2–3 away win at Norwich City that secured Liverpool's pre-season aim of qualifying for the UEFA Champions League. However, the following 0–2 home defeat to Chelsea put the title back in Manchester City's favour due to their significantly better goal difference. That pivotal match was marred by Chelsea's "comically brazen" time-wasting, that went unpunished until the 93rd minute by Martin Atkinson (despite José Mourinho telling his players he wanted "at least two bookings for time-wasting before half-time"), and it is foremost known for a Steven Gerrard slip that led to Chelsea's key goal by Demba Ba. Gerrard has spoken of his anguish over the slip, saying it was "even tougher than what people probably think it was". Other key moments cited as playing a part in Liverpool falling short of the title include the previously mentioned incorrectly disallowed goal by Raheem Sterling at Manchester City's Etihad Stadium, Kolo Touré passing the ball to Victor Anichebe allowing West Bromwich Albion to earn a draw on 2 February and Jordan Henderson's 93rd minute sending-off (and associated three-match ban) in the home game versus Manchester City, which Liverpool manager Brendan Rodgers thought was "a huge miss for us" because Liverpool "couldn't replace Jordan".

Liverpool's attempts to reverse Manchester City's +9 goal difference advantage in their penultimate game against Crystal Palace saw their initial 0–3 lead pegged back to a 3–3 draw. Liverpool finished in second place, two points behind Manchester City, after they defeated Newcastle United on the final day. This represented the closest the club had come to winning the league title since 1990.

The season was the first since 1995–96 without Jamie Carragher, who retired from professional football after the 2012–13 season.

== First team ==
As it stands on 11 May 2014

Squad No.	Name	Nationality	Position(s)	Date of birth	Signed from	Apps	Goals	Assists
Goalkeepers
1	Brad Jones	(Australia)	GK	19 March 1982 (aged 32)	(England) Middlesbrough	22	0	0
22	Simon Mignolet	(Belgium)	GK	6 March 1988 (aged 26)	(England) Sunderland	40	0	0
52	Danny Ward	(Wales)	GK	22 June 1993 (aged 20)	(Wales) Wrexham	0	0	0
Defenders
2	Glen Johnson	(England)	RB/LB	23 August 1984 (aged 29)	(England) Portsmouth	172	8	13
3	José Enrique	(Spain)	LB	23 January 1986 (aged 28)	(England) Newcastle United	87	2	8
4	Kolo Touré	(Ivory Coast)	CB	19 March 1981 (aged 33)	(England) Manchester City	24	0	2
5	Daniel Agger (vice-captain)	(Denmark)	CB	12 December 1984 (aged 29)	(Denmark) Brøndby	232	14	8
17	Mamadou Sakho	(France)	CB	13 February 1990 (aged 25)	(France) Paris Saint-Germain	19	1	0
20	Aly Cissokho	(France)	LB	15 September 1987 (aged 26)	(Spain) Valencia	19	0	1
34	Martin Kelly	(England)	RB	27 April 1990 (aged 24)	(England) LFC Academy	62	1	2
37	Martin Škrtel	(Slovakia)	CB	15 December 1984 (aged 29)	(Russia) Zenit	245	16	5
38	Jon Flanagan	(England)	RB/LB	1 January 1993 (aged 21)	(England) LFC Academy	42	1	1
44	Brad Smith	(Australia)	LB	9 April 1994 (aged 20)	(England) LFC Academy	1	0	0
47	Andre Wisdom	(England)	RB/CB	9 May 1993 (aged 21)	(England) LFC Academy	22	1	2
Midfielders
6	Luis Alberto	(Spain)	AM/CF	28 September 1992 (aged 21)	(Spain) Sevilla	12	0	1
8	Steven Gerrard (captain)	(England)	DM/CM	30 May 1980 (aged 34)	(England) LFC Academy	669	173	144
10	Philippe Coutinho	(Brazil)	AM/LW	12 June 1992 (aged 21)	(Italy) Inter Milan	50	8	13
12	Victor Moses	(Nigeria)	LW/RW	12 December 1990 (aged 23)	(England) Chelsea	22	2	0
14	Jordan Henderson	(England)	CM/RM	17 June 1990 (aged 23)	(England) Sunderland	132	13	15
21	Lucas	(Brazil)	DM	9 January 1987 (aged 27)	(Brazil) Grêmio	243	6	15
24	Joe Allen	(Wales)	DM/CM	14 March 1990 (aged 24)	(Wales) Swansea City	63	3	0
31	Raheem Sterling	(England)	LW/RW/AM	8 December 1994 (aged 19)	(England) Queens Park Rangers	77	12	8
33	Jordon Ibe	(England)	LW/RW	8 December 1995 (aged 18)	(England) Wycombe Wanderers	3	0	2
53	João Carlos Teixeira	(Portugal)	AM/LW	18 January 1993 (aged 21)	(Portugal) Sporting	1	0	0
Forwards
7	Luis Suárez	(Uruguay)	FW	24 January 1987 (aged 27)	(Netherlands) Ajax	133	82	29
9	Iago Aspas	(Spain)	ST/LW	1 August 1987 (aged 26)	(Spain) Celta	15	1	1
15	Daniel Sturridge	(England)	ST	1 September 1989 (aged 24)	(England) Chelsea	49	35	10

== Transfers and loans ==
=== Transfers in ===
Entry date	Position	No.	Player	From club	Fee
22 June 2013	AM	6	(Spain) Luis Alberto	(Spain) Sevilla	£6,800,000
23 June 2013	FW	9	(Spain) Iago Aspas	(Spain) Celta Vigo	£7,000,000
27 June 2013	GK	22	(Belgium) Simon Mignolet	(England) Sunderland	£9,000,000
2 July 2013	CB	4	(Ivory Coast) Kolo Touré	(England) Manchester City	Free
2 September 2013	CB	26	(Portugal) Tiago Ilori	(Portugal) Sporting CP	£7,000,000
2 September 2013	CB	17	(France) Mamadou Sakho	(France) Paris Saint-Germain	£15,000,000

=== Loans in ===
Start date	End date	Position	No.	Player	From club
20 August 2013	31 May 2014	LB	20	(France) Aly Cissokho	(Spain) Valencia
2 September 2013	31 May 2014	LW	12	(Nigeria) Victor Moses	(England) Chelsea

=== Transfers out ===
Exit date	Position	No.	Player	To club	Fee	Ref.
7 February 2013	CB	23	(England) Jamie Carragher	Retired		
27 May 2013	CB	22	(Scotland) Danny Wilson	(Scotland) Heart of Midlothian	Released	
19 June 2013	ST	9	(England) Andy Carroll	(England) West Ham United	£15,500,000	
3 July 2013	CM	33	(England) Jonjo Shelvey	(Wales) Swansea City	£5,000,000	
8 August 2013	DM	20	(England) Jay Spearing	(England) Bolton Wanderers	£1,500,000	
13 August 2013	LW	19	(England) Stewart Downing	(England) West Ham United	£5,000,000	
2 September 2013	AM	12	(Spain) Dani Pacheco	(Spain) Alcorcón	Released	
3 January 2014	ST	50	(England) Adam Morgan	(England) Yeovil Town	Released	

=== Loans out ===
Start date	End date	Position	No.	Player	To club
10 July 2013	9 October 2013	ST		(England) Michael Ngoo	(England) Yeovil Town
12 July 2013	31 May 2014	AM	30	(Spain) Suso	(Spain) Almería
19 July 2013	1 January 2014	ST		(Democratic Republic of the Congo) Henoc Mukendi	(Scotland) Partick Thistle
22 July 2013	1 January 2014	DM	35	(England) Conor Coady	(England) Sheffield United
26 July 2013	30 June 2014	AM		(Hungary) Krisztián Adorján	(Netherlands) Groningen
29 July 2013	31 May 2014	GK	25	(Spain) Pepe Reina	(Italy) Napoli
1 August 2013	31 May 2014	LB	49	(England) Jack Robinson	(England) Blackpool
27 August 2013	31 May 2014	MF	11	(Morocco) Oussama Assaidi	(England) Stoke City
2 September 2013	31 May 2014	FW	29	(Italy) Fabio Borini	(England) Sunderland
10 September 2013	1 January 2014	FW	53	(Portugal) João Carlos Teixeira	(England) Brentford
22 October 2013	31 May 2014	RB/CB	47	(England) Andre Wisdom	(England) Derby County
9 January 2014	31 May 2014	RB	43	(Northern Ireland) Ryan McLaughlin	(England) Barnsley
20 January 2014	31 May 2014	CB	26	(Portugal) Tiago Ilori	(Spain) Granada
23 January 2014	31 May 2014	CB	16	(Uruguay) Sebastián Coates	(Uruguay) Nacional
31 January 2014	31 May 2014	FW		(England) Michael Ngoo	(England) Walsall
21 February 2014	31 May 2014	FW	33	(England) Jordon Ibe	(England) Birmingham City

=== Transfer summary ===
Spending

Summer: ▼£44,800,000

Winter: £0

Total: ▼£44,800,000

Income

Summer: ▲£28,000,000

Winter: £0

Total: ▲£28,000,000

Expenditure

Summer: ▼£16,800,000

Winter: £0

Total: ▼£16,800,000

== Pre-season and friendlies ==
13 July 2013 Friendly	Preston North End (England)	0–4	(England) Liverpool	Preston
15:00 BST		Report	Coutinho 14' (pen.); Ibe 37'; Sterling 64'; Aspas 75'	Stadium: Deepdale; Attendance: 21,190; Referee: Neil Swarbrick

20 July 2013 Friendly	Indonesia XI	0–2	(England) Liverpool	Jakarta, Indonesia
14:30 BST		Report	Coutinho 10'; Sterling 88'	Stadium: GBK Stadium; Attendance: 82,143

24 July 2013 Friendly	Melbourne Victory (Australia)	0–2	(England) Liverpool	Melbourne, Australia
11:00 BST		Report	Gerrard 31'; Aspas 90+2'	Stadium: Melbourne Cricket Ground; Attendance: 95,446; Referee: Jumpei Iida

28 July 2013 Friendly	Thailand	0–3	(England) Liverpool	Bangkok, Thailand
11:40 BST		Report	Coutinho 16'; Aspas 49'; Gerrard 59'	Stadium: Rajamangala National Stadium

3 August 2013 Friendly	Liverpool (England)	2–0	(Greece) Olympiacos	Liverpool
12:45 BST	Allen 23'; Henderson 62'	Report		Stadium: Anfield; Attendance: 44,362; Referee: Mark Halsey

7 August 2013 Friendly	Vålerenga (Norway)	1–4	(England) Liverpool	Oslo, Norway
18:00 BST	González 35'	Report	Luis Alberto 31'; Aspas 44'; Kelly 54'; Sterling 90'	Stadium: Ullevaal Stadium; Referee: Tom Harald Hagen

10 August 2013 Friendly	Liverpool (England)	0–1	(Scotland) Celtic	Dublin, Ireland
17:00 BST		Report	Baldé 12'	Stadium: Aviva Stadium; Attendance: 51,000

14 May 2014 Friendly	Shamrock Rovers (Republic of Ireland)	0–4	(England) Liverpool	Dublin, Ireland
17:30 BST		Report	Aspas 8'; Borini 47'; Kelly 74'; Dunn 82'	Stadium: Aviva Stadium; Referee: Padraig Sutton

== Competitions ==
=== Overall record ===
Competition	First match	Last match	Starting round	Final position	Record							
Competition	First match	Last match	Starting round	Final position	Pld	W	D	L	GF	GA	GD	Win %
Premier League	17 August 2013	11 May 2014	Matchday 1	2nd	38	26	6	6	101	50	+51	68.42
FA Cup	5 January 2014	16 February 2014	Third round	Fifth round	3	2	0	1	5	2	+3	66.67
Football League Cup	27 August 2013	25 September 2013	Third round	Fourth round	2	1	0	1	4	3	+1	50.00
Total					43	29	6	8	110	55	+55	67.44

Source: Soccerway

=== Premier League ===
This season recorded an all-time high mark of goals scored by Liverpool in all their English top flight seasons. Only in 1895–96 Division 2 did the Reds score more league goals over the course of a season – 106 versus 101 they netted this season.

==== League table ====
Pos	Team	Pld	W	D	L	GF	GA	GD	Pts	Qualification or relegation
1	Manchester City (C)	38	27	5	6	102	37	+65	86	Qualification for the Champions League group stage
2	Liverpool	38	26	6	6	101	50	+51	84	Qualification for the Champions League group stage
3	Chelsea	38	25	7	6	71	27	+44	82	Qualification for the Champions League group stage
4	Arsenal	38	24	7	7	68	41	+27	79	Qualification for the Champions League play-off round
5	Everton	38	21	9	8	61	39	+22	72	Qualification for the Europa League group stage

Source: Barclays Premier League
Rules for classification: 1) Points; 2) Goal difference; 3) Goals scored; 4) Play-offs (only if needed to decide champion, teams for relegation or teams for UEFA competitions).
(C) Champions

==== Results summary ====
Overall								Home						Away					
Pld	W	D	L	GF	GA	GD	Pts	W	D	L	GF	GA	GD	W	D	L	GF	GA	GD
38	26	6	6	101	50	+51	84	16	1	2	53	18	+35	10	5	4	48	32	+16

Last updated: 11 May 2014.
Source: BBC Sport

==== Results by matchday ====
Matchday	1	2	3	4	5	6	7	8	9	10	11	12	13	14	15	16	17	18	19	20	21	22	23	24	25	26	27	28	30	31	29^{1}	32	33	34	35	36	37	38
Ground	H	A	H	A	H	A	H	A	H	A	H	A	A	H	H	A	H	A	A	H	A	H	H	A	H	A	H	A	A	A	H	H	A	H	A	H	A	H
Result	W	W	W	D	L	W	W	D	W	L	W	D	L	W	W	W	W	L	L	W	W	D	W	D	W	W	W	W	W	W	W	W	W	W	W	L	D	W
Position	4	2	1	1	2	2	1	3	2	3	2	2	4	4	2	2	1	4	5	4	4	4	4	4	4	4	4	2	2	2	2	1	1	1	1	1	2	2
Points	3	6	9	10	10	13	16	17	20	20	23	24	24	27	30	33	36	36	36	39	42	43	46	47	50	53	56	59	62	65	68	71	74	77	80	80	81	84

Source: Statto.com
A = Away; H = Home; W = Win; D = Draw; L = Loss
Notes:
- ^{1} Matchday 29 (v. Sunderland) was postponed due to Sunderland's participation in the FA Cup semi-finals.

==== Matches ====
The Premier League fixtures were released on 18 June 2013.

Win Draw Loss Fixtures

17 August 2013 1	Liverpool	1–0	Stoke City	Liverpool
12:45 BST	Sturridge 37'; Touré (yellow card) 76'	Report	Nzonzi (yellow card) 44'	Stadium: Anfield; Attendance: 44,822; Referee: Martin Atkinson

24 August 2013 2	Aston Villa	0–1	Liverpool	Birmingham
17:30 BST	Luna (yellow card) 22'; Delph (yellow card) 40'; Lowton (yellow card) 61'	Report	Sturridge 21'; Aspas (yellow card) 29'; Johnson (yellow card) 45+2'; Lucas (yellow card) 89'	Stadium: Villa Park; Attendance: 42,098; Referee: Mark Clattenburg

1 September 2013 3	Liverpool	1–0	Manchester United	Liverpool
13:30 BST	Sturridge 4'; Aspas (yellow card) 35'; Lucas (yellow card) 90'	Report	Cleverley (yellow card) 35'; Van Persie (yellow card) 39'; Carrick (yellow card) 41'; Young (yellow card) 59'	Stadium: Anfield; Attendance: 44,411; Referee: Andre Marriner

16 September 2013 4	Swansea City	2–2	Liverpool	Swansea
20:00 BST	Shelvey 2', (yellow card) 56'; Williams (yellow card) 50'; Michu 64'	Report	Sturridge 4'; Moses 36'; Lucas (yellow card) 56'; Henderson (yellow card) 61'; Wisdom (yellow card) 66'	Stadium: Liberty Stadium; Attendance: 20,752; Referee: Michael Oliver

21 September 2013 5	Liverpool	0–1	Southampton	Liverpool
15:00 BST		Report	Lovren 53'; Clyne (yellow card) 81'	Stadium: Anfield; Attendance: 44,755; Referee: Neil Swarbrick

29 September 2013 6	Sunderland	1–3	Liverpool	Sunderland
16:00 BST	Giaccherini 52', (yellow card) 59'; Colback (yellow card) 80'	Report	Sturridge 28'; Suárez 36', 89'; Lucas (yellow card) 82'	Stadium: Stadium of Light; Attendance: 41,415; Referee: Howard Webb

5 October 2013 7	Liverpool	3–1	Crystal Palace	Liverpool
15:00 BST	Suárez 13'; Sturridge 17'; Gerrard 38' (pen.); Sterling (yellow card) 76'; Aspas (yellow card) 90+4'	Report	O'Keefe (yellow card) 10'; Gayle 76'	Stadium: Anfield; Attendance: 44,721; Referee: Anthony Taylor

19 October 2013 8	Newcastle United	2–2	Liverpool	Newcastle upon Tyne
12:45 BST	Cabaye 23'; Yanga-Mbiwa (red card) 40'; Dummett 56'; Gouffran (yellow card) 68'; Debuchy (yellow card) 86'	Report	Gerrard 42' (pen.), (yellow card) 45+2'; Touré (yellow card) 71'; Sturridge 72', (yellow card) 84'	Stadium: St James' Park; Attendance: 51,703; Referee: Andre Marriner

26 October 2013 9	Liverpool	4–1	West Bromwich Albion	Liverpool
15:00 BST	Suárez 12', 17', 55'; Sturridge 77'	Report	Yacob (yellow card) 54'; Morrison 66' (pen.); Olsson (yellow card) 72'	Stadium: Anfield; Attendance: 44,747; Referee: Jon Moss

2 November 2013 10	Arsenal	2–0	Liverpool	Holloway
17:30 GMT	Cazorla 19'; Sagna (yellow card) 26'; Ramsey 59'; Jenkinson (yellow card) 90'	Report	Cissokho (yellow card) 28'	Stadium: Emirates Stadium; Attendance: 60,042; Referee: Martin Atkinson

9 November 2013 11	Liverpool	4–0	Fulham	Liverpool
15:00 GMT	Amorebieta 23' (o.g.); Škrtel 26'; Suárez 36', 54'	Report	Parker (yellow card) 25'	Stadium: Anfield; Attendance: 44,768; Referee: Mike Jones

23 November 2013 12	Everton	3–3	Liverpool	Liverpool
12:45 GMT	Mirallas 8', (yellow card) 36'; Barkley (yellow card) 31'; Lukaku 72', 82'; Distin (yellow card) 89'; Barry (yellow card) 90+5'	Report	Coutinho 5'; Suárez 19', (yellow card) 79'; Allen (yellow card) 62'; Lucas (yellow card) 67'; Sturridge 89'	Stadium: Goodison Park; Attendance: 39,576; Referee: Phil Dowd

1 December 2013 13	Hull City	3–1	Liverpool	Kingston upon Hull
14:05 GMT	Livermore 20'; Davies (yellow card) 25'; Brady (yellow card) 44'; Meyler 72'; Škrtel 87' (o.g.)	Report	Gerrard 27'	Stadium: KC Stadium; Attendance: 24,940; Referee: Howard Webb

4 December 2013 14	Liverpool	5–1	Norwich City	Liverpool
19:45 GMT	Suárez 15', 29', 35', 74'; Allen (yellow card) 33'; Gerrard (yellow card) 43'; Flanagan (yellow card) 69'; Sterling 88'	Report	Johnson (yellow card) 20', (goal) 83'	Stadium: Anfield; Attendance: 44,541; Referee: Anthony Taylor

7 December 2013 15	Liverpool	4–1	West Ham United	Liverpool
15:00 GMT	Demel 42' (o.g.); Sakho 47'; Suárez 81', 84'	Report	Škrtel 66' (o.g.); J. Cole (yellow card) 75'; Demel (yellow card) 82'; Nolan (red card) 82'; Collins (yellow card) 90+1'	Stadium: Anfield; Attendance: 44,781; Referee: Michael Oliver

15 December 2013 16	Tottenham Hotspur	0–5	Liverpool	Tottenham
16:00 GMT	Dawson (yellow card) 27'; Walker (yellow card) 43'; Paulinho (red card) 63'; Holtby (yellow card) 66'	Report	Suárez 18', 84'; Henderson 40'; Flanagan 75'; Sterling 89'	Stadium: White Hart Lane; Attendance: 36,069; Referee: Jon Moss

21 December 2013 17	Liverpool	3–1	Cardiff City	Liverpool
12:45 GMT	Suárez 25', 45'; Škrtel (yellow card) 41'; Sterling 42', (yellow card) 72'	Report	Mutch 58'	Stadium: Anfield; Attendance: 44,621; Referee: Lee Probert

26 December 2013 18	Manchester City	2–1	Liverpool	Manchester
19:30 GMT	Kompany 31'; Negredo 45+1'; Zabaleta (yellow card) 81'	Report	Coutinho 24'; Johnson (yellow card) 68'; Moses (yellow card) 86'; Suárez (yellow card) 90+1'	Stadium: City of Manchester Stadium; Attendance: 47,351; Referee: Lee Mason

29 December 2013 19	Chelsea	2–1	Liverpool	Fulham
16:00 GMT	Hazard 17'; Eto'o 34'; Terry (yellow card) 47'; David Luiz (yellow card) 50'; Cahill (yellow card) 79'; Oscar (yellow card) 90+4'	Report	Škrtel 3'; Johnson (yellow card) 40'	Stadium: Stamford Bridge; Attendance: 41,614; Referee: Howard Webb

1 January 2014 20	Liverpool	2–0	Hull City	Liverpool
15:00 GMT	Agger 36'; Suárez (yellow card) 39', (goal) 50'	Report	Bruce (yellow card) 21'; Davies (yellow card) 86'	Stadium: Anfield; Attendance: 44,627; Referee: Craig Pawson

12 January 2014 21	Stoke City	3–5	Liverpool	Stoke-on-Trent
16:10 GMT	Crouch 39'; Adam 45'; Shawcross (yellow card) 58'; Walters 85'	Report	Shawcross 5' (o.g.); Suárez 32', 71'; Gerrard 51' (pen.); Cissokho (yellow card) 53'; Sturridge 87'	Stadium: Britannia Stadium; Attendance: 27,160; Referee: Anthony Taylor

18 January 2014 22	Liverpool	2–2	Aston Villa	Liverpool
17:30 GMT	Sturridge 45+2'; Gerrard 53' (pen.); Sterling (yellow card) 90'	Report	Clark (yellow card) 16'; El Ahmadi (yellow card) 21'; Weimann 25'; Benteke 36'; Bertrand (yellow card) 48'; Bacuna (yellow card) 88'	Stadium: Anfield; Attendance: 44,737; Referee: Jon Moss

28 January 2014 23	Liverpool	4–0	Everton	Liverpool
20:00 GMT	Gerrard 21'; Sturridge 33', 35'; Suárez 50'	Report	Pienaar (yellow card) 38'; Barry (yellow card) 45+2'; Mirallas (yellow card) 52'	Stadium: Anfield; Attendance: 44,450; Referee: Martin Atkinson

2 February 2014 24	West Bromwich Albion	1–1	Liverpool	West Bromwich
13:30 GMT	Yacob (yellow card) 15'; Ridgewell (yellow card) 62'; Anichebe 67'; Mulumbu (yellow card) 82'; Lugano (yellow card) 86'	Report	Sturridge 24'; Suárez (yellow card) 74'; Gerrard (yellow card) 81'	Stadium: The Hawthorns; Attendance: 26,132; Referee: Kevin Friend

8 February 2014 25	Liverpool	5–1	Arsenal	Liverpool
12:45 GMT	Škrtel 1', 10'; Sterling 16', 52'; Sturridge 20'; Henderson (yellow card) 47'	Report	Giroud (yellow card) 47'; Wilshere (yellow card) 59'; Arteta 69' (pen.)	Stadium: Anfield; Attendance: 44,701; Referee: Michael Oliver

12 February 2014 26	Fulham	2–3	Liverpool	Fulham
20:00 GMT	Touré 8' (o.g.); Kvist (yellow card) 9'; Riether (yellow card) 50'; Richardson 63', (yellow card) 64'; Heitinga (yellow card) 90+1'	Report	Sturridge 41'; Coutinho (yellow card) 56', (goal) 72'; Henderson (yellow card) 77'; Gerrard 90+1' (pen.), (yellow card) 90+2'	Stadium: Craven Cottage; Attendance: 25,375; Referee: Phil Dowd

23 February 2014 27	Liverpool	4–3	Swansea City	Liverpool
13:30 GMT	Sturridge 3', 36'; Henderson 20', 74'; Škrtel (yellow card) 26'	Report	Shelvey 23'; Škrtel 27' (o.g.); Bony 47' (pen.)	Stadium: Anfield; Attendance: 44,731; Referee: Mike Jones

1 March 2014 28	Southampton	0–3	Liverpool	Southampton
17:30 GMT	Wanyama (yellow card) 84'	Report	Suárez 16'; Sterling 58'; Henderson (yellow card) 70'; Gerrard (yellow card) 86', (goal) 90+5' (pen.)	Stadium: St Mary's Stadium; Attendance: 31,659; Referee: Lee Probert

16 March 2014 30	Manchester United	0–3	Liverpool	Trafford
13:30 GMT	Rafael (yellow card) 32'; Vidić (yellow card) 71' (yellow-red card) 77'	Report	Flanagan (yellow card) 31'; Gerrard 34' (pen.), 46' (pen.), (yellow card) 37'; Škrtel (yellow card) 54'; Suárez 84'; Sturridge (yellow card) 84'	Stadium: Old Trafford; Attendance: 75,225; Referee: Mark Clattenburg

22 March 2014 31	Cardiff City	3–6	Liverpool	Cardiff
15:00 GMT	Mutch 9', 88'; Campbell 25'; Cala (yellow card) 33'; Fabio (yellow card) 50'	Report	Gerrard (yellow card) 2'; Suárez 16', 60', 90+6'; Škrtel 41', 54', (yellow card) 90+2'; Sturridge 75'; Allen (yellow card) 90+4'	Stadium: Cardiff City Stadium; Attendance: 28,018; Referee: Neil Swarbrick

26 March 2014 29	Liverpool	2–1	Sunderland	Liverpool
20:00 GMT	Gerrard 39'; Sturridge 48'	Report	Vergini (yellow card) 37'; Bardsley (yellow card) 40'; Ki Sung-yueng 76'	Stadium: Anfield; Attendance: 44,524; Referee: Kevin Friend
Note: Fixture was initially scheduled for 8 March, but was postponed due to Sunderland's participation in the FA Cup semi-finals.

30 March 2014 32	Liverpool	4–0	Tottenham Hotspur	Liverpool
16:00 BST	Kaboul 2' (o.g.); Suárez 25'; Coutinho 55'; Henderson 75'	Report	Kaboul (yellow card) 33'; Sigurðsson (yellow card) 46'	Stadium: Anfield; Attendance: 44,762; Referee: Phil Dowd

6 April 2014 33	West Ham United	1–2	Liverpool	Upton Park
16:00 BST	Tomkins (yellow card) 43'; Demel 45+2'; Adrián (yellow card) 70'; Nocerino (yellow card) 80'; Armero (yellow card) 86'	Report	Gerrard 44' (pen.), 71' (pen.)	Stadium: Boleyn Ground; Attendance: 34,977; Referee: Anthony Taylor

13 April 2014 34	Liverpool	3–2	Manchester City	Liverpool
13:37 BST	Suárez (yellow card) 5'; Sterling 6'; Škrtel 26'; Coutinho 78'; Henderson (red card) 90+3'	Report	García (yellow card) 21'; Fernandinho (yellow card) 45+1'; Silva 57'; Johnson 62' (o.g.); Zabaleta (yellow card) 78'	Stadium: Anfield; Attendance: 44,601; Referee: Mark Clattenburg

20 April 2014 35	Norwich City	2–3	Liverpool	Norwich
12:00 BST	Snodgrass (yellow card) 29', (goal) 77'; Turner (yellow card) 45'; Hooper 54'; Howson (yellow card) 72'	Report	Sterling 4', 62'; Suárez 11'; Škrtel (yellow card) 65'; Flanagan (yellow card) 79'	Stadium: Carrow Road; Attendance: 26,857; Referee: Andre Marriner

27 April 2014 36	Liverpool	0–2	Chelsea	Liverpool
14:05 BST		Report	Salah (yellow card) 21'; Lampard (yellow card) 43'; Ba 45+3'; Cole (yellow card) 90+3'; Torres (yellow card) 90+3'; Willian 90+4'	Stadium: Anfield; Attendance: 44,726; Referee: Martin Atkinson

5 May 2014 37	Crystal Palace	3–3	Liverpool	Selhurst
20:00 BST	Mariappa (yellow card) 30'; Dann (yellow card) 67'; Delaney 79'; Gayle 81', 88'	Report	Allen 18', (yellow card) 25'; Suárez (yellow card) 50', (goal) 55'; Delaney 53' (o.g.); Škrtel (yellow card) 63'	Stadium: Selhurst Park; Attendance: 25,261; Referee: Mark Clattenburg

11 May 2014 38	Liverpool	2–1	Newcastle United	Liverpool
15:00 BST	Agger 63'; Sturridge 65'; Lucas (yellow card) 89'	Report	Škrtel 20' (o.g.); Debuchy (yellow card) 35'; Anita (yellow card) 63'; Gouffran (yellow card) 65'; Ameobi (yellow card) 66' (yellow-red card) 66'; Dummett (red card) 87'	Stadium: Anfield; Attendance: 44,724; Referee: Phil Dowd

==== Aggregate scores ====
Opposition	Home score	Away score	Aggregate	Double	Points
Arsenal	5–1	2–0	5–3	No	3
Aston Villa	2–2	0–1	3–2	No	4
Cardiff City	3–1	3–6	9–4	Yes	6
Chelsea	0–2	2–1	1–4	No	0
Crystal Palace	3–1	3–3	6–4	No	4
Everton	4–0	3–3	7–3	No	4
Fulham	4–0	2–3	7–2	Yes	6
Hull City	2–0	3–1	3–3	No	3
Manchester City	3–2	2–1	4–4	No	3
Manchester United	1–0	0–3	4–0	Yes	6
Newcastle United	2–1	2–2	4–3	No	4
Norwich City	5–1	2–3	8–3	Yes	6
Southampton	0–1	0–3	3–1	No	3
Stoke City	1–0	3–5	6–3	Yes	6
Sunderland	2–1	1–3	5–2	Yes	6
Swansea City	4–3	2–2	6–5	No	4
Tottenham Hotspur	4–0	0–5	9–0	Yes	6
West Bromwich Albion	4–1	1–1	5–2	No	4
West Ham United	4–1	1–2	6–2	Yes	6

=== FA Cup ===
5 January 2014 Third round	Liverpool	2–0	Oldham Athletic	Liverpool
15:00 GMT	Aspas 54'; Tarkowski 82' (o.g.); Sterling (yellow card) 88'	Report	Smith (yellow card) 1'; Kusunga (yellow card) 90+1'; Dayton (yellow card) 90+3'	Stadium: Anfield; Attendance: 44,102; Referee: Stuart Attwell

25 January 2014 Fourth round	Bournemouth	0–2	Liverpool	Bournemouth
12:45 GMT		Report	Moses 26'; Gerrard (yellow card) 57'; Sturridge 60'	Stadium: Goldsands Stadium; Attendance: 11,475; Referee: Lee Probert

16 February 2014 Fifth round	Arsenal	2–1	Liverpool	Holloway
16:00 GMT	Monreal (yellow card) 7'; Oxlade-Chamberlain 16'; Flamini (yellow card) 35'; Podolski 47'	Report	Flanagan (yellow card) 15'; Coutinho (yellow card) 20'; Gerrard (yellow card) 42', (goal) 59' (pen.)	Stadium: Emirates Stadium; Attendance: 59,801; Referee: Howard Webb

=== League Cup ===
27 August 2013 Second round	Liverpool	4–2 (a.e.t.)	Notts County	Liverpool
19:45 BST	Sterling 4', (yellow card) 105+1'; Sturridge 29', 105+4'; Wisdom (yellow card) 98'; Henderson 110'	Report	Campbell-Ryce (yellow card) 52'; Arquin 62', (yellow card) 77'; Phillip 84'	Stadium: Anfield; Attendance: 42,231; Referee: Stuart Attwell

25 September 2013 Third round	Manchester United	1–0	Liverpool	Trafford
19:45 BST	Giggs (yellow card) 41'; Hernández 46'; Jones (yellow card) 71'	Report	Lucas (yellow card) 39'; Touré (yellow card) 51'; Henderson (yellow card) 75'	Stadium: Old Trafford; Attendance: 65,701; Referee: Mark Clattenburg

== Squad statistics ==
=== Appearances ===
Numbers in parentheses denote appearances as substitute.
Players with no appearances not included in the list.

As of match played 12 May 2014

No.	Pos.	Nat.	Name	Premier League	FA Cup	League Cup	Total
No.	Pos.	Nat.	Name	Apps	Apps	Apps	Apps
1	GK	AUS	Brad Jones	0	3	0	3
2	DF	ENG	Glen Johnson	29	0	1	30
3	DF	ESP	José Enrique	6 (2)	0	1	7 (2)
4	DF	CIV	Kolo Touré	15 (5)	2	2	19 (5)
5	DF	DEN	Daniel Agger	16 (4)	2	0 (1)	18 (5)
6	MF	ESP	Luis Alberto	0 (9)	1 (1)	1	2 (10)
7	FW	URU	Luis Suárez	33	2 (1)	1	36 (1)
8	MF	ENG	Steven Gerrard	33 (1)	3	2	38 (1)
9	FW	ESP	Iago Aspas	5 (9)	1	0	6 (9)
10	MF	BRA	Philippe Coutinho	28 (5)	2 (1)	0 (1)	30 (7)
12	MF	NGA	Victor Moses	6 (13)	2	1	9 (13)
14	MF	ENG	Jordan Henderson	35	2 (1)	1 (1)	38 (2)
15	FW	ENG	Daniel Sturridge	26 (3)	2	2	30 (3)
17	DF	FRA	Mamadou Sakho	17 (1)	0	1	18 (1)
20	DF	FRA	Aly Cissokho	12 (3)	3	1	16 (3)
21	MF	BRA	Lucas	20 (7)	0 (1)	1	21 (8)
22	GK	BEL	Simon Mignolet	38	0	2	40
24	MF	WAL	Joe Allen	15 (9)	1	1	17 (9)
31	MF	ENG	Raheem Sterling	24 (9)	2 (1)	1 (1)	27 (11)
34	DF	ENG	Martin Kelly	0 (5)	2	0 (1)	2 (6)
37	DF	SVK	Martin Škrtel	36	2	1	39
38	DF	ENG	Jon Flanagan	23	1 (1)	0	24 (1)
44	DF	ENG	Brad Smith	0 (1)	0	0	0 (1)
53	MF	POR	João Carlos Teixeira	0 (1)	0	0	0 (1)
Players sold or loaned out after the start of the season:
33	MF	ENG	Jordon Ibe	0 (1)	0	1	1 (1)
47	DF	ENG	Andre Wisdom	1 (1)	0	1	2 (1)

=== Goalscorers ===
Includes all competitive matches. The list is sorted by shirt number when total goals are equal.

As of match played 11 May 2014

Rank	Pos.	No.	Player	Premier League	FA Cup	League Cup	Total
1	FW	7	(Uruguay) Luis Suárez	31	0	0	31
2	FW	15	(England) Daniel Sturridge	21	1	2	24
3	MF	8	(England) Steven Gerrard	13	1	0	14
4	MF	31	(England) Raheem Sterling	9	0	1	10
5	DF	37	(Slovakia) Martin Škrtel	7	0	0	7
6	MF	10	(Brazil) Philippe Coutinho	5	0	0	5
6	MF	14	(England) Jordan Henderson	4	0	1	5
8	DF	5	(Denmark) Daniel Agger	2	0	0	2
8	MF	12	(Nigeria) Victor Moses	1	1	0	2
10	FW	9	(Spain) Iago Aspas	0	1	0	1
10	DF	17	(France) Mamadou Sakho	1	0	0	1
10	MF	24	(Wales) Joe Allen	1	0	0	1
10	DF	38	(England) Jon Flanagan	1	0	0	1
Own goals				5	1	0	6
Totals				101	5	4	110

=== Disciplinary record ===
As of match played 5 May 2014

No.	Pos.	Name	Premier League		FA Cup		League Cup		Total	
No.	Pos.	Name	Yellow card	Red card	Yellow card	Red card	Yellow card	Red card	Yellow card	Red card
2	DF	(England) Glen Johnson	3	0	0	0	0	0	3	0
4	DF	(Ivory Coast) Kolo Touré	2	0	0	0	1	0	3	0
7	FW	(Uruguay) Luis Suárez	5	0	0	0	0	0	5	0
8	MF	(England) Steven Gerrard	7	0	2	0	0	0	9	0
9	FW	(Spain) Iago Aspas	3	0	0	0	0	0	3	0
10	MF	(Brazil) Philippe Coutinho	1	0	1	0	0	0	2	0
12	MF	(Nigeria) Victor Moses	1	0	0	0	0	0	1	0
14	MF	(England) Jordan Henderson	4	1	0	0	1	0	5	1
15	FW	(England) Daniel Sturridge	1	0	0	0	0	0	1	0
20	DF	(France) Aly Cissokho	2	0	0	0	0	0	2	0
21	MF	(Brazil) Lucas	5	0	0	0	1	0	6	0
24	MF	(Wales) Joe Allen	4	0	0	0	0	0	4	0
31	MF	(England) Raheem Sterling	3	0	1	0	1	0	5	0
37	DF	(Slovakia) Martin Škrtel	5	0	0	0	0	0	5	0
38	DF	(England) Jon Flanagan	2	0	1	0	0	0	3	0
47	DF	(England) Andre Wisdom	1	0	0	0	1	0	2	0
Total			49	1	5	0	5	0	59	1

== Awards ==
The inaugural Players' Awards dinner was held on 6 May at the Liverpool ACC Conference Centre.

- Liverpool Players' Player of the Year Award: Luis Suárez
- Liverpool Supporters' Player of the Year Award: Luis Suárez
- Liverpool Supporters' Young Player of the Year Award: Raheem Sterling
- Goal of the Season Award: Luis Suárez for his 40-yard volley against Norwich City on 4 December.
- Outstanding Achievement Award: Brendan Rodgers
- Academy Players' Player of the Year: Jordan Rossiter
- Lifetime Achievement Award: Ronnie Moran

=== Standard Chartered Player of the Month ===
Month	Player	Source
August	(England) Daniel Sturridge	
September	(Belgium) Simon Mignolet	
October	(Uruguay) Luis Suárez	
November	(Uruguay) Luis Suárez	
December	(Uruguay) Luis Suárez	
January	(Uruguay) Luis Suárez	
February	(England) Daniel Sturridge	
March	(England) Steven Gerrard	
April	(England) Raheem Sterling	
