= Martin Škrtel =

Slovak footballer (born 1984)

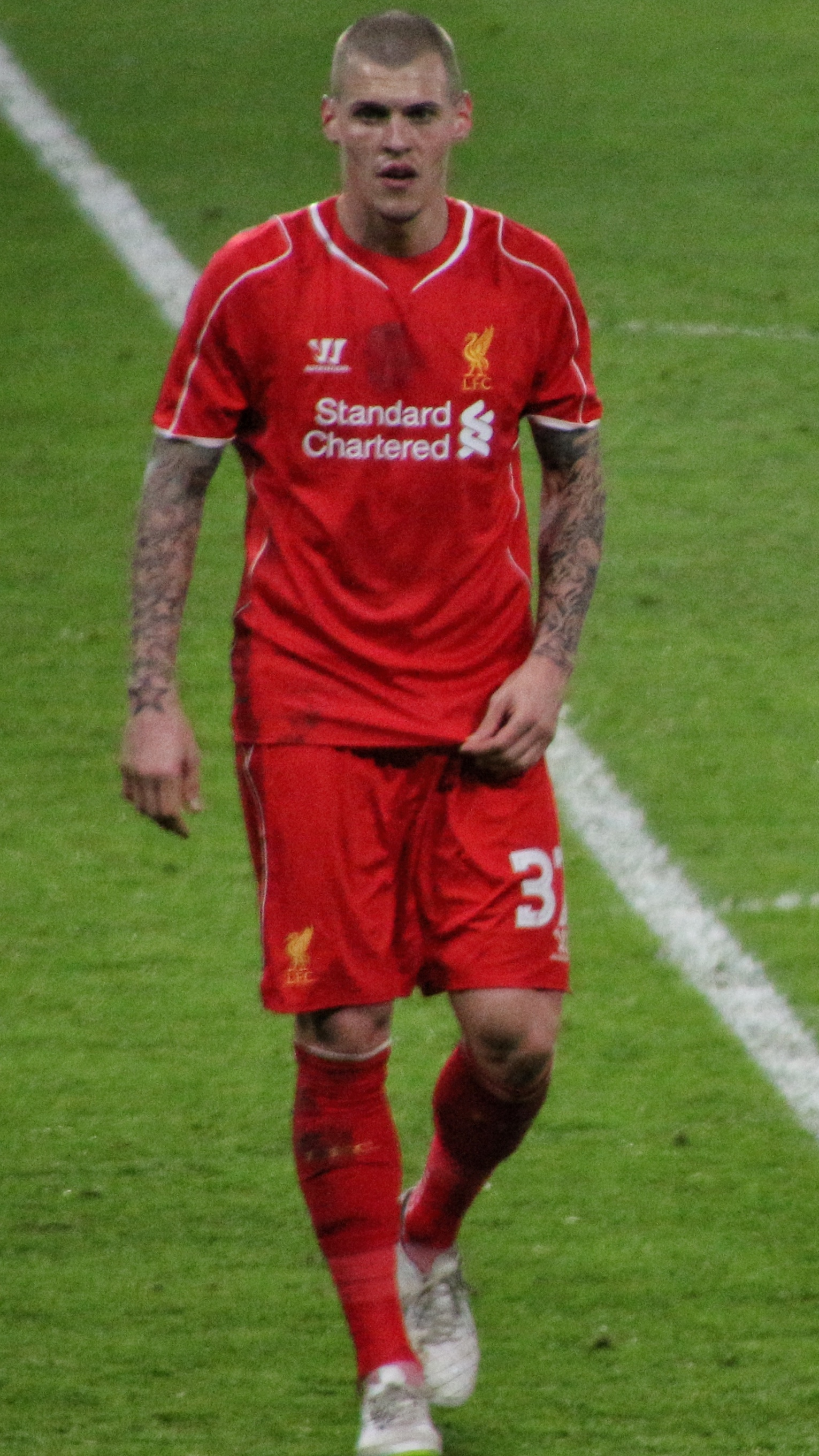
- Škrtel playing for Liverpool in 2015

Personal information
- Full name: Martin Škrtel
- Date of birth: 15 December 1984 (age 41)
- Place of birth: Handlová, Czechoslovakia
- Height: 1.91 m (6 ft 3 in)
- Position: Centre-back

Youth career
- Hajskala Ráztočno
- 1990–2001: Baník Prievidza

Senior career*
Years	Team	Apps	(Gls)
2001–2004	Trenčín	45	(0)
2004–2008	Zenit Saint Petersburg	74	(3)
2008–2016	Liverpool	242	(16)
2016–2019	Fenerbahçe	79	(6)
2019	Atalanta	0	(0)
2019–2021	İstanbul Başakşehir	30	(3)
2021–2022	Spartak Trnava	18	(0)
2022–2025	Hajskala Ráztočno	21	(1)
Total		489	(28)

International career
2004–2019	Slovakia	104	(6)

Managerial career
- 2025: Spartak Trnava (interim)
- * Club domestic league appearances and goals

Martin Škrtel (born 15 December 1984) is a Slovak former professional footballer who played as a centre-back. He is currently the sporting director of Slovak First League club Spartak Trnava.

Škrtel played for FK AS Trenčín and Zenit Saint Petersburg, before joining Liverpool for £6.5 million in January 2008. After eight and a half years with Liverpool, where he made 320 appearances and scored 18 goals, he joined Fenerbahçe in July 2016. He has won the Russian Premier League and the League Cup, as well as being named Slovak Footballer of the Year four times.

Škrtel made his international debut for Slovakia in 2004 and earned a total of 104 caps, making him the third most-capped player of his country at the time of his retirement in 2019, behind Marek Hamšík and Miroslav Karhan. He also retired as Slovakia's 10th best international scorer with 6 goals. Škrtel represented his country as they reached the Round of 16 at both the 2010 FIFA World Cup and UEFA Euro 2016.

== Early life ==
Škrtel was born on 15 December 1984 in Handlová.

== Club career ==
=== FC Baník Prievidza and FK AS Trenčín ===
Škrtel started his professional career at local side FC Baník Prievidza and soon made a move to FK AS Trenčín, where he made 44 appearances and scored 8 goals between 2001 and 2004.

=== Zenit Saint Petersburg ===
Škrtel made his debut for Zenit Saint Petersburg against Irtysh Omsk in a Russian Cup match on 31 July 2004. He said that the presence of Slovak and Czech players helped him to adjust to his new club. He made 113 appearances and scored 5 goals for the club, winning the Russian Premier League title in the 2007 season.

Valencia, Tottenham Hotspur, Everton and Newcastle United were all reported to be interested in his services, but he ended up signing for Liverpool in the January 2008 transfer window.

=== Liverpool ===
==== 2007–08 season ====
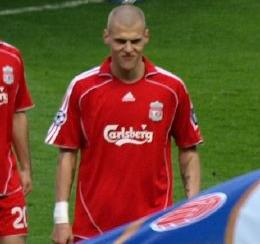
Škrtel playing for Liverpool in 2008

Škrtel signed for Premier League club Liverpool on 11 January 2008 on a four-and-a-half-year contract for a transfer fee of £6.5 million. On the completion of the deal, Liverpool manager Rafael Benítez said of Škrtel:

"He is aggressive, quick, is good in the air and I think he's a very good player for the future and also for the present. He is very competitive, but his mentality for me is very good".

He made his debut for the club on 21 January 2008, coming on as an 70th minute substitute for Álvaro Arbeloa in a 2–2 home draw against Aston Villa. Benítez also compared Škrtel to Jamie Carragher, his defensive partner and the club's vice-captain at the time.

On 26 January 2008, Škrtel made his first start for Liverpool in a FA Cup fourth round match against Conference South club Havant & Waterlooville where he gave away a corner that put Liverpool 1–0 behind and was also involved in Havant’s second goal that also saw Liverpool go 2–1 down after they equalized before they eventually won 5–2.

On 10 February 2008, Škrtel was highly praised for his performance in Liverpool’s 0–0 away draw against Chelsea in the Premier League making several good clearances and inceptions and was named Man of the Match by Liverpool fans on their official website. He was also praised for his performance in Liverpool’s 1–0 win against Everton on 30 March 2008, Škrtel’s first Merseyside derby in which he was again named Man of the Match.

==== 2008–09 season ====
Škrtel made a bright start to the 2008–09 season, starting in all but one Premier League match and displacing out of favour Daniel Agger to the bench. He put in a number of strong performances with defensive partner Jamie Carragher against many top teams, notably Manchester United, Everton and Marseille in the UEFA Champions League. On 5 October 2008, Škrtel suffered a serious knee injury after falling awkwardly when challenging Ched Evans late in a match against Manchester City, which Liverpool went on to win 3–2. It was later confirmed that he had torn the posterior cruciate ligament in his right knee but did not require surgery and was "expected to be out until late December".

On 28 December 2008, Škrtel returned from injury as a late substitute in Liverpool's 5–1 away win against Newcastle United. He was a regular starter for Liverpool during the second-half of the season, as the club finished second in the Premier League with 86 points.

==== 2009–10 season ====
On 21 November 2009, Škrtel scored his first goal for Liverpool in a 2–2 draw against Manchester City. On 25 February 2010, he broke a metatarsal in his right foot while playing in a 3–1 UEFA Europa League victory over Unirea Urziceni. On 18 August 2010, Škrtel signed a two-year contract extension with Liverpool, committing his future to the club until 2014.

==== 2010–11 season ====
During the 2010–11 season, Škrtel played every minute of every Premier League match. On 28 November 2010, in a match against Tottenham Hotspur at White Hart Lane, Škrtel scored both his second goal for the club and his first Premier League own goal as Liverpool lost 2–1. On 15 December 2010, (his 26th birthday), he captained Liverpool in an 0–0 draw against Utrecht in the Europa League.

In May 2011, Škrtel stated that he felt the 2010–11 season had been his best season for the club to date.

==== 2011–12 season ====
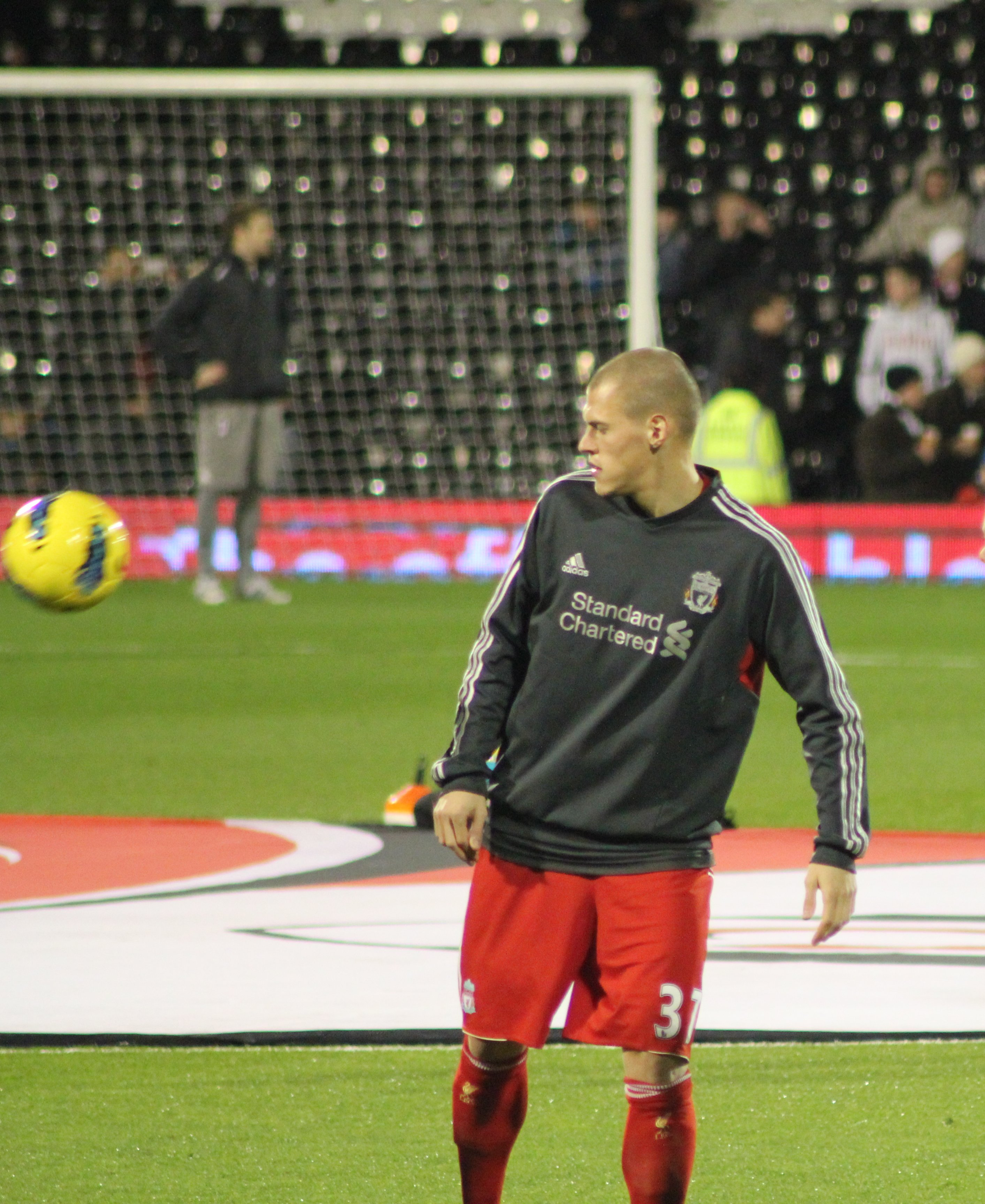
Škrtel warming up for Liverpool in 2011

On 27 August 2011, Škrtel scored a headed goal for Liverpool against Bolton Wanderers in his first league appearance of the season from an unfamiliar right-back position. On 18 September, he was sent off in a 4–0 away defeat against Tottenham Hotspur.

On 18 December 2011, Škrtel scored Liverpool's second goal in a 2–0 league win away to Aston Villa, scoring with a header after a corner from Craig Bellamy. At the midway point of the season, Liverpool had the best defensive record in the Premier League. Liverpool left-back José Enrique described Škrtel and Daniel Agger as "the best defensive partnership in the Premier League".

Škrtel's header opened the scoring in the FA Cup fifth round match against Brighton & Hove Albion on 19 February 2012, with Liverpool going on to win 6–1. On 26 February 2012, Škrtel scored against Cardiff City in the League Cup final. Liverpool won 3–2 on penalties after the match had ended in a 2–2 draw, giving Škrtel his first trophy as a Liverpool player, as he became the first Slovakian to win the trophy.

On 10 April 2012, Škrtel captained Liverpool for the first time in the Premier League, leading his club to a 3–2 win against Blackburn Rovers and playing a major part in the first goal with a long pass to Craig Bellamy, who subsequently squared for Maxi Rodríguez to make the score 1–0. On 5 May, he started for Liverpool in the 2–1 FA Cup final defeat to Chelsea.

Škrtel was named the Liverpool Player of the Year in May 2012.

==== 2012–13 season ====
On 20 August 2012, Škrtel announced that he would commit his future to Liverpool by signing a new contract.

Škrtel's 2012–13 season got off to a bad start, giving away a penalty in a 3–0 loss to West Bromwich Albion on 18 August 2012. A week later, he scored the club's first Premier League goal of the season in a 2–2 draw against Manchester City. Later in the match, his poorly executed backpass to Pepe Reina was intercepted by Carlos Tevez to equalise for Manchester City.

In January 2013, Škrtel was dropped from the Liverpool team after a poor performance in an 3–2 defeat to Oldham Athletic in the FA Cup. After starting only four Premier League matches in the second half of the season, Škrtel called 2012–13 "one of the worst seasons in my career and certainly the worst during my time at Liverpool".

==== 2013–14 season ====
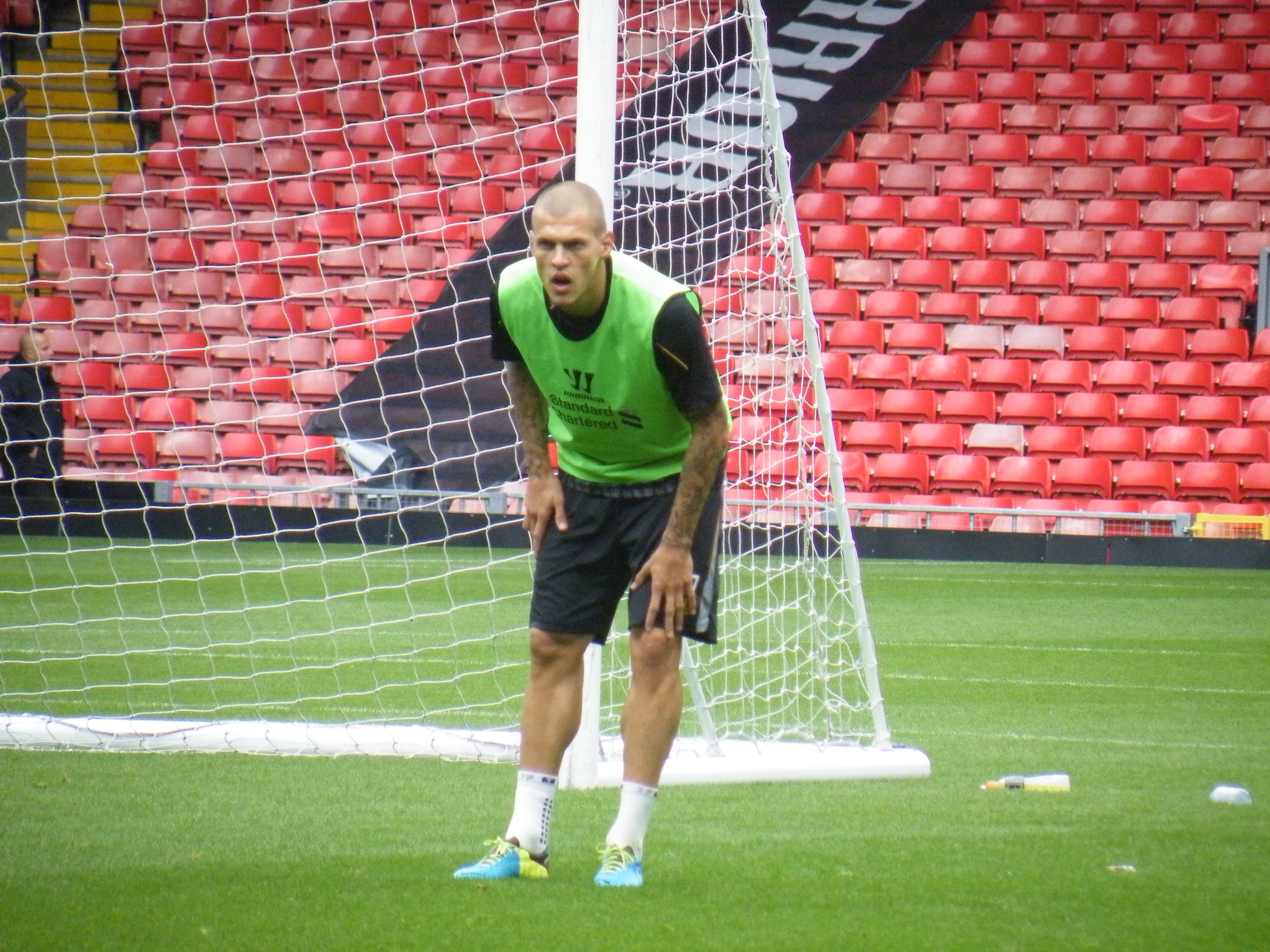
Škrtel training with Liverpool in 2013

On 22 August 2013, it was reported that Liverpool had rejected a £10 million offer for Škrtel from Rafael Benítez's Napoli.

After missing the first two matches of the season, Škrtel helped Liverpool keep a clean sheet in 1–0 home win against Manchester United on 1 September 2013. On 9 November 2013, he scored his first goal of the season in a 4–0 win against Fulham. On 29 December, he gave Liverpool a third-minute lead against Chelsea in a 2–1 defeat at Stamford Bridge.

On 8 February 2014, Škrtel scored twice in the first-ten minutes against Arsenal, to help Liverpool to a 5–1 win. On 22 March, he scored another brace in a 6–3 win over Cardiff City. On 13 April, he scored Liverpool's second goal in a crucial 3–2 win over Manchester City at Anfield to reach seven goals in the 2013–14 Premier League season.

On 11 May 2014, he scored a record fourth own-goal of the Premier League season in a 2–1 win against Newcastle United. Despite those four own goals, Škrtel scored some decisive goals for Liverpool in some matches. Since his return against Manchester United in the third match of the season, he played every minute for Liverpool in the Premier League.

==== 2014–15 season ====
On 4 November 2014, Škrtel captained Liverpool in a UEFA Champions League match against Real Madrid at the Santiago Bernabéu as captain Steven Gerrard and vice-captain Jordan Henderson were both on the bench; Liverpool lost the match 1–0. After a poor beginning to the season, manager Brendan Rodgers switched to a three-man defensive line in October, with Škrtel playing a crucial part. His pace, athleticism and ball-playing abilities were key in this formation.

On 21 December, in a league game at Anfield against Arsenal, Škrtel received a head wound from an accidental collision with Olivier Giroud; the treatment added nine minutes onto the end of the match, in which Škrtel headed a 97th-minute equaliser for a vital 2–2 draw. In a League Cup semi-final defeat to Chelsea on 27 January 2015, Škrtel was stamped on by Chelsea forward Diego Costa. Referee Michael Oliver did not penalise the incident, but Costa was retrospectively banned for three matches by The Football Association (FA).

On 8 March 2015 in a sixth round FA Cup match against Blackburn Rovers, Škrtel was substituted and then taken to hospital after a collision with Rudy Gestede. Later that month, Škrtel was given a three-match ban for violent conduct by the FA for a stamp on Manchester United goalkeeper David de Gea. He unsuccessfully appealed, claiming it to be unintentional.

==== 2015–16 season ====
On 10 July 2015, Škrtel signed a new contract with Liverpool. On 23 September 2015, he played his 300th match for Liverpool in a League Cup penalty shootout win over Carlisle United. Škrtel scored his first goal of the season on 21 November 2015, scoring the fourth goal in a 4–1 win away at Manchester City with a thunderous volley from the edge of the box off of a corner. The goal came exactly six years after Škrtel had scored his first goal for Liverpool against the same opponents. On 6 December 2015, Škrtel joined his former defence partner Jamie Carragher in second position on the all-time Premier League Own Goals list by scoring his seventh in a 2–0 defeat against Newcastle United. On 20 December, Škrtel suffered a tear in his hamstring and tendon which kept him on the sideline for six weeks.

=== Fenerbahçe ===
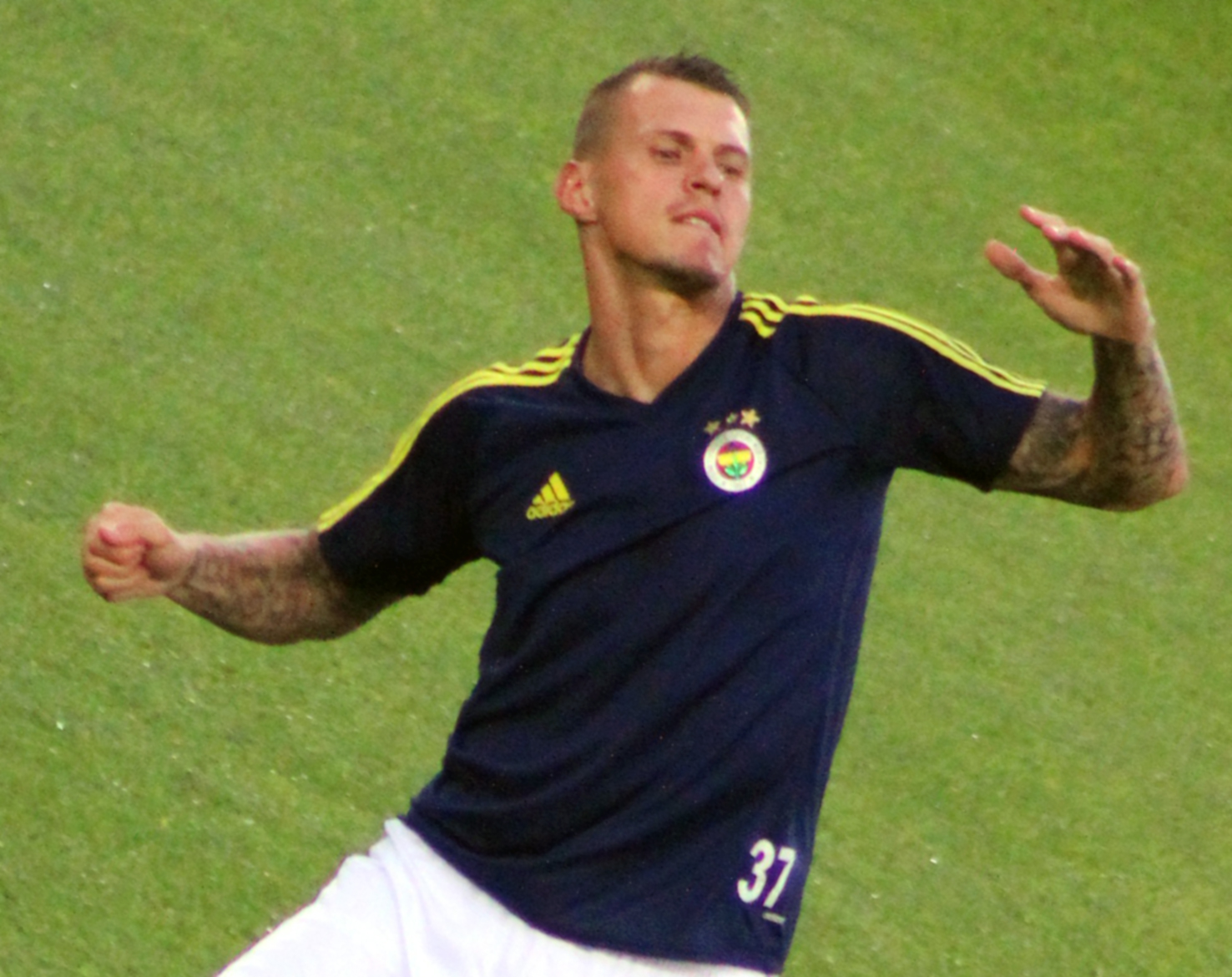
Škrtel training with Fenerbahçe in 2017

On 14 July 2016, Škrtel signed for Turkish Süper Lig club Fenerbahçe for a reported fee of £5 million. In his first season with Fenerbahçe, Škrtel made 31 appearances in the league, scoring 2 goals.

=== Atalanta ===
On 9 August 2019, Škrtel joined Serie A club Atalanta. His contract was terminated three weeks later by mutual consent. He was not able to adapt with new environment, conditions and training methods. In an interview a week later, Škrtel said that a player like him just did not fit the Atalanta system. On 17 September 2019, Atalanta president Antonio Percassi stated in an interview that Škrtel's wife, Barbora, could be one of the reasons of his departure. Percassi said that she did not really want to move to Bergamo.

=== İstanbul Başakşehir ===
On 2 September 2019, he returned to Turkey signing for İstanbul Başakşehir. He made his debut for the club on 14 September, in a 1–1 draw against Sivasspor. He made 20 appearances and scored three goals in the 2019–20 Süper Lig winning campaign, which was the first top flight title in the club's history.

He reached an agreement to leave Başakşehir on 13 January 2021 with less than six months remaining on his contract after suffering an Achilles tendon rupture in December 2020.

=== Spartak Trnava ===
On 13 August 2021, Skrtel returned to Slovakia after 17 years to play for Spartak Trnava.

On 26 February 2022, Škrtel appeared in his first derby between Spartak and Slovan Bratislava. The match at Tehelné pole ended in a 0–0 draw. Post-match Škrtel was insulted by one of the home fans and an amateur-side club official.

Later, on 1 March 2022, Škrtel broke the club record at Trnava becoming club's oldest goalscorer beating Igor Šemrinec of Košice in a Cup match at Košická futbalová aréna in a 2–1 victory for Spartak. He was the only scorer in club history aged over 37 – precisely 37 years, 2 months and 14 days, beating the previous record held by Karol Tibenský.

=== Post-retirement (amateur level) ===
On 5 August 2022, Škrtel left Spartak Trnava to fulfil his promise and finish his career at his childhood club FK Hajskala Ráztočno, playing a local league (eight tier) in Prievidza region.

== Non-playing career ==
=== DAC Dunajská Streda ===
On 19 September 2024, Škrtel was named at the press conference as the new sporting director of DAC 1904 Dunajská Streda. However, he left the club after only 35 days in the office.

=== Spartak Trnava ===
After resigning from his position at Dunajská, Škrtel became a sports director at Spartak Trnava on 10 March 2025. On 18 November 2025, after the sacking of Michal Ščasný, it was announced that Škrtel would become Spartak Trnava's interim manager, in addition to his position of sporting director. In his first game as manager, Spartak won 2–1 away against Košice, courtesy of late goals from Martin Mikovič and Erik Sabo. Škrtel led the team to four wins out of five matches before the winter break, after which Antonio Muñoz was appointed manager of Spartak.

== International career ==
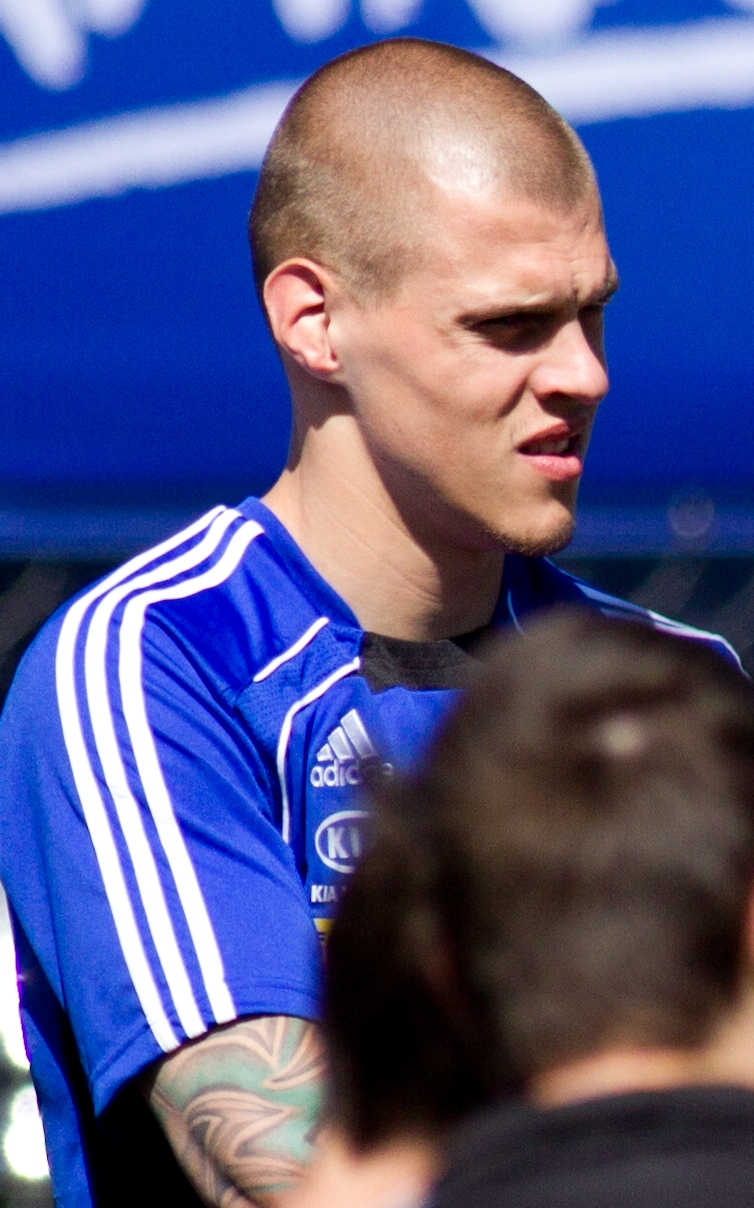
Škrtel training with Slovakia in 2010

Having represented Slovakia at various youth levels, Škrtel made his debut for the senior squad against Japan at the 2004 Kirin Cup. He was selected in Slovakia's squad for the 2010 FIFA World Cup and UEFA Euro 2016, serving as captain in the latter.

On 13 October 2018, Škrtel earned his 100th cap in a home friendly match against Czech Republic in Trnava, becoming the third most-capped Slovak footballer.

On 22 February 2019, Škrtel announced his retirement from international football at the age of 34, along with another national team defender Tomáš Hubočan and forward Adam Nemec. The trio shared a farewell game on 13 October 2019 in a friendly match against Paraguay, which coincided with a national team return to Tehelné pole after 10 years. Škrtel played in the starting XI as a captain and was replaced by Denis Vavro after 30 minutes. The game finished as a 1–1 draw.

== Style of play ==
Škrtel is known as a strong centre-back with significant aerial ability. Lucas Leiva has stated that he “is really strong and he gives the midfield confidence” owing to his quality. Sami Hyypiä expressed his belief that Škrtel had quickly shown that he was “very athletic” and that he could “play the ball”.

== Personal life ==
On 7 October 2011, Škrtel and his wife Barbora Škrtelová welcomed a son named Matteo.

== Career statistics ==
=== Club ===
Appearances and goals by club, season and competition
Club	Season	League			National Cup (Note: Includes Russian Cup, FA Cup, Turkish Cup, Slovak Cup)		League Cup (Note: Includes Football League Cup)		Europe		Total	
Club	Season	Division	Apps	Goals	Apps	Goals	Apps	Goals	Apps	Goals	Apps	Goals
FK AS Trenčín	2002–03	Slovak Super Liga	11	0			—		—		11	0
FK AS Trenčín	2003–04	Slovak Super Liga	34	0			—		—		34	0
FK AS Trenčín	Total		45	0			—		—		45	0
Zenit Saint Petersburg	2004	Russian Premier League	7	0	2	0	—		5 (Note: Appearances in UEFA Cup)	0	14	0
Zenit Saint Petersburg	2005	Russian Premier League	18	1	6	0	—		4	0	28	1
Zenit Saint Petersburg	2006	Russian Premier League	26	1	6	2	—		5	0	37	3
Zenit Saint Petersburg	2007	Russian Premier League	23	1	6	0	—		5	0	34	1
Zenit Saint Petersburg	Total		74	3	20	2	—		19	0	113	5
Liverpool	2007–08	Premier League	14	0	1	0	—		5 (Note: Appearances in UEFA Champions League)	0	20	0
Liverpool	2008–09	Premier League	21	0	2	0	0	0	7	0	30	0
Liverpool	2009–10	Premier League	19	1	2	0	2	0	6 (Note: Four appearances in UEFA Champions League, two in UEFA Europa League)	0	29	1
Liverpool	2010–11	Premier League	38	2	1	0	0	0	10 (Note: Appearances in UEFA Europa League)	0	49	2
Liverpool	2011–12	Premier League	34	2	5	1	6	1	—		45	4
Liverpool	2012–13	Premier League	25	2	1	0	0	0	7	0	33	2
Liverpool	2013–14	Premier League	36	7	2	0	1	0	—		39	7
Liverpool	2014–15	Premier League	33	1	5	0	3	0	7 (Note: Five appearances in UEFA Champions League, two in UEFA Europa League)	0	48	1
Liverpool	2015–16	Premier League	22	1	0	0	3	0	2	0	27	1
Liverpool	Total		242	16	19	1	15	1	44	0	320	18
Fenerbahçe	2016–17	Süper Lig	31	2	7	1	—		11 (Note: Two appearances in UEFA Champions League, nine in UEFA Europa League)	0	49	3
Fenerbahçe	2017–18	Süper Lig	21	3	5	0	—		4	0	30	3
Fenerbahçe	2018–19	Süper Lig	27	1	4	0	—		9 (Note: Two appearances in UEFA Champions League, seven in UEFA Europa League)	0	40	1
Fenerbahçe	Total		79	6	16	1	—		24	0	119	7
Atalanta	2019–20	Serie A	0	0	—		—		—		0	0
İstanbul Başakşehir	2019–20	Süper Lig	20	3	1	0	—		8	1	29	4
İstanbul Başakşehir	2020–21	Süper Lig	10	0	0	0	—		5	0	15	0
İstanbul Başakşehir	Total		30	3	1	0	—		13	1	44	4
Spartak Trnava	2021–22	Slovak Super Liga	18	0	3	1	—		—		21	1
Career total			488	28	59	5	15	1	100	1	662	35

=== International ===
Appearances and goals by national team and year
National team	Year	Apps	Goals
Slovakia	2004	2	0
Slovakia	2005	6	0
Slovakia	2006	7	1
Slovakia	2007	7	3
Slovakia	2008	6	1
Slovakia	2009	9	0
Slovakia	2010	10	0
Slovakia	2011	5	0
Slovakia	2012	6	0
Slovakia	2013	7	0
Slovakia	2014	5	0
Slovakia	2015	7	0
Slovakia	2016	11	1
Slovakia	2017	7	0
Slovakia	2018	8	0
Slovakia	2019	1	0
Total		104	6

Slovakia score listed first, score column indicates score after each Škrtel goal

List of international goals scored by Martin Škrtel
No.	Date	Venue	Cap	Opponent	Score	Result	Competition	Ref.
1	2 September 2006	Tehelné pole, Bratislava, Slovakia	12	Cyprus	1–0	6–1	UEFA Euro 2008 qualifying	
2	7 February 2007	Jerez de la Frontera, Cádiz, Spain	16	Poland	2–0	2–2	Friendly	
3	24 March 2007	GSP Stadium, Nicosia, Cyprus	17	Cyprus	2–1	3–1	UEFA Euro 2008 qualifying	
4	13 October 2007	Mestský štadión, Dubnica, Slovakia	20	San Marino	4–0	7–0	UEFA Euro 2008 qualifying	
5	6 September 2008	Tehelné pole, Bratislava, Slovakia	27	Northern Ireland	1–0	2–1	2010 FIFA World Cup qualification	
6	11 November 2016	Anton Malatinský Stadium, Trnava, Slovakia	88	Lithuania	3–0	4–0	2018 FIFA World Cup qualification	

== Managerial statistics ==
As of 13 December 2025

Managerial record by team and tenure
Team	From	To	Record							
Team	From	To	P	W	D	L	GF	GA	GD	Win %
Spartak Trnava	18 November 2025	31 December 2025	5	4	0	1	10	5	+5	80.00

== Honours ==
Zenit Saint Petersburg

- Russian Premier League: 2007

Liverpool

- Football League Cup: 2011–12
- FA Cup runner-up: 2011–12
- UEFA Europa League runner-up: 2015–16

İstanbul Başakşehir

- Süper Lig: 2019–20

Spartak Trnava

- Slovak Cup: 2021–22

Individual

- Slovak Footballer of the Year: 2007, 2008, 2011, 2012
- Liverpool Player of the Year: 2011–12
- Premier League Player of the Year by Northwest Football Awards: 2012

== See also ==
- List of men's footballers with 100 or more international caps
