= Adam Morgan (English footballer) =

English footballer

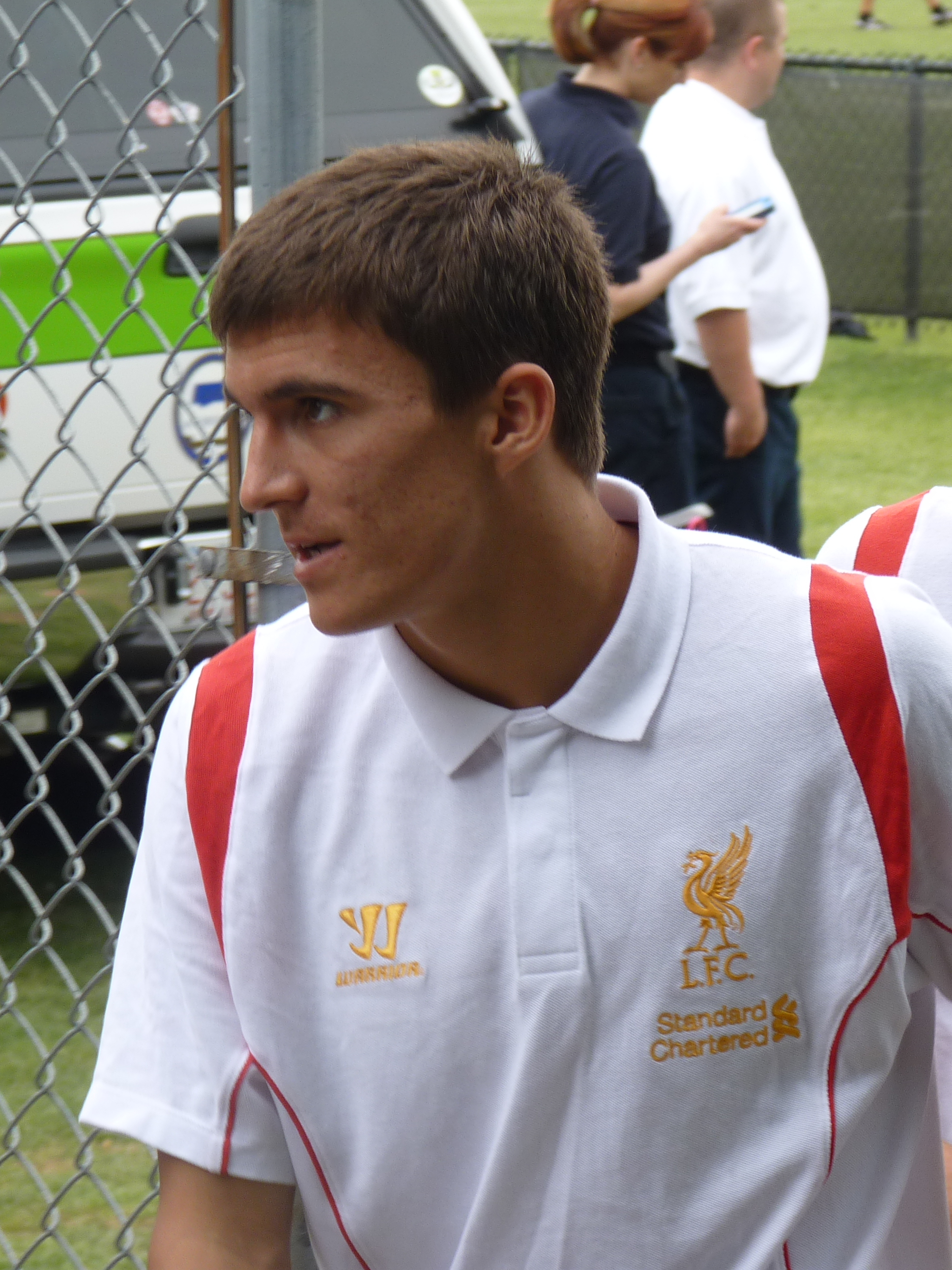
- Morgan with Liverpool in 2012

Personal information
- Full name: Adam Joseph Morgan
- Date of birth: 21 April 1994 (age 32)
- Place of birth: Liverpool, England
- Height: 1.79 m (5 ft 10 in)
- Position: Striker

Team information
- Current team: Clitheroe (player/assistant manager)

Youth career
- 2002–2012: Liverpool

Senior career*
Years	Team	Apps	(Gls)
2012–2014	Liverpool	10	(12)
2013	→ Rotherham United (loan)	1	(0)
2013–2014	→ Yeovil Town (loan)	4	(0)
2014–2015	Yeovil Town	14	(1)
2014–2015	→ St Johnstone (loan)	5	(0)
2015–2016	Accrington Stanley	2	(0)
2016	Hemel Hempstead Town	3	(0)
2016	Colwyn Bay	5	(2)
2016	Curzon Ashton	5	(3)
2016–2018	FC Halifax Town	39	(13)
2018	Sligo Rovers	16	(4)
2018–2019	Curzon Ashton	10	(2)
2019	Mossley	10	(5)
2019	Widnes	0	(0)
2019–2020	Romford	12	(8)
2020–2021	Chelmsford City	25	(8)
2021	→ Chelmsford City Reserves	3	(3)
2021–2022	Braintree Town	3	(0)
2022	Haringey Borough	6	(1)
2022–2024	Halewood Apollo	37	(33)
2024	City of Liverpool	4	(1)
2024	Runcorn Linnets	5	(0)
2024–	Clitheroe	0	(0)

International career
2010–2011	England U17	17	(4)
2011–2012	England U19	5	(1)
- * Club domestic league appearances and goals as of 14:53, 16 December 2024 (UTC)

Adam Joseph Morgan (born 21 April 1994) is an English footballer who plays as a striker for Northern Premier League Division One West club Clitheroe where he holds the role of player/assistant manager.

He is a UEFA qualified coach and is running his own youth football coaching service.

== Club career ==
=== Liverpool ===
A product of the Liverpool Youth Academy, Morgan garnered attention for his goalscoring exploits during the 2010–11 FA Premier Academy League Group C season. Morgan scored 18 goals in 16 games, making him Liverpool's leading goalscorer, including a run of scoring in each of 12 consecutive games towards the end of the season. Robbie Fowler commented that "as a finisher he is probably one of the best I've seen for a long, long time." Morgan's efficiency in front of goal brought him a debut for the Liverpool Reserves on 12 April 2011 against Bolton Wanderers, in which Morgan netted the only goal of the game.

On 1 July 2011, it was announced that Morgan had signed a contract extension at Anfield to keep him at the club until June 2014. In the 2011–12 season, Morgan split his time between the under 18s and the Reserves. The bulk of his appearances came for the under-18s where he again top-scored with 13 goals in 21 games. He appeared 17 times for the Reserves, netting five times- three of which came in nine NextGen Series games.

Morgan was taken on Liverpool's pre-season tour of the US by new manager Brendan Rodgers in July 2012. On 21 July, Morgan scored his first senior goal for Liverpool in the friendly against Toronto FC, slotting in a goal-bound shot from Raheem Sterling. Morgan appeared in the second game of the tour against Roma, before being handed his first senior start against Tottenham Hotspur on 28 July 2012. On 23 August 2012, he made his senior debut for the club, coming on as a 90th-minute substitute in a UEFA Europa League qualifying match against Hearts, replacing Fabio Borini in a 1–0 win. The following week, he started his first competitive match in the return fixture in which he had seemed to have scored his first official goal for Liverpool but it was ruled out as the ball had already gone out of play. On 19 September, Morgan was one of the clutch of teenagers to travel to Switzerland to play Young Boys in a Europa League group game, but didn't make the 18-man squad. On 8 November, Morgan started the group game loss against Anzhi Makhachkala, playing 61 minutes before being replaced by Daniel Pacheco. On 19 August, Morgan scored once in a 4–2 win against rivals Manchester United at the Salford City Stadium in an under 21s league game.

On 3 January 2013, Morgan joined League Two side Rotherham United on loan to gain first-team experience at the New York Stadium, being handed the number 11 shirt. It was confirmed that he would join on a youth loan until 9 February. He made his debut on 5 January 2013 against Aldershot in the FA Cup. His second and last Rotherham appearance came a week later, playing 56 minutes of the 2–0 league defeat to Barnet. He was replaced by Daniel Nardiello.

=== Yeovil Town ===
On 28 November 2013, Morgan signed for Football League Championship side Yeovil Town on loan until January with a view to a permanent deal in the new year. Morgan made his debut, on 30 November 2013, in Yeovil's 3–0 victory at Watford. With the opening of the 2014 January transfer window Morgan's loan deal expired and he signed a two-and-a-half-year permanent contract with Yeovil Town.

==== Loan to St. Johnstone ====
After falling out of favour with Yeovil manager Gary Johnson, on 8 August 2014, Morgan signed for Scottish Premiership club St Johnstone on loan until January 2015. On 13 August 2014, Morgan made his St. Johnstone debut as a second-half substitute in a 3–0 league defeat to Celtic. Morgan made only five appearances for St. Johnstone and following a sending off in a development game against Heart of Midlothian in October 2014 he did not play again for the Perth side. His loan spell was cut short by St. Johnstone in December 2014.

==== Return to Yeovil ====
Following his return to Yeovil, Morgan continued to be frozen out from the first-team squad by Gary Johnson until his departure on 4 February 2015. His replacement Terry Skiverton allowed Morgan to return to the first-team squad, and on 21 February 2015 he made his first Yeovil appearance for almost a year as a late substitute against Gillingham. Morgan scored a last minute penalty for his first professional goal to earn Yeovil a 2–2 draw.

=== Accrington Stanley ===
At the end of the season Morgan was offered a severance deal by Yeovil, and on 4 June 2015, he signed for League Two side Accrington Stanley on a one-year deal.

=== Hemel Hempstead Town ===
In January 2016, Morgan signed for National League South side Hemel Hempstead Town.

=== Colwyn Bay ===
Morgan joined Northern Premier League Premier Division side Colwyn Bay in March 2016. His registration was cancelled in April 2016 after failing to attend a game.

=== Curzon Ashton ===
Morgan then moved to Curzon Ashton. On 5 November 2016, he scored a late goal that earned Curzon an FA Cup first round replay against Westfields. Morgan then scored twice in the replay sending Curzon through to play in a televised 2nd round tie. Morgan scored a hat trick in Curzon Ashton's FA Cup second round tie against AFC Wimbledon, however, his team still lost, giving up four goals in the last 10 minutes. Morgan's opening goal in the tie was scored from distance in the first minute of the game and was voted as the goal of the round.

=== FC Halifax Town ===
On 23 December 2016, Morgan left Curzon Ashton for fellow National League North side FC Halifax Town, signing an 18-month contract.

=== Sligo Rovers ===
Morgan's time in Ireland got off to a promising start, as he scored four times in his first six appearances. However, with injury problems hampering his progress, he left by mutual consent in August 2018 with a tally of five goals in 17 appearances in all competitions.

On 13 September 2018, Morgan rejoined Curzon Ashton before moving to Mossley.

=== Later career ===
On 28 October 2019, it was announced that Morgan had joined Northern Premier League Division One North West side Widnes.

In November 2019, he joined Romford.

On 13 July 2020, Morgan signed for Chelmsford City. On 26 November 2021, Chelmsford announced Morgan had left the club.

On 30 November 2021, Morgan signed for rivals Braintree Town.

In February 2022, after three appearances for Braintree, Morgan dropped down a level to sign for Isthmian League club Haringey Borough.

Following his spell at Haringey, Morgan joined Liverpool County Premier League side Halewood Apollo.

In July 2024, Morgan joined Northern Premier League Division One West side City of Liverpool.

In October 2024, Morgan joined Northern Premier League Division One West side Runcorn Linnets.

In December 2024, Morgan joined Clitheroe as player/assistant-manager.

== International career ==
Morgan has represented England at under-17 and at under-19 level. He has been capped 17 times for the England national under-17 football team, scoring four goals. He played at the 2011 FIFA U-17 World Cup in Mexico in which he scored one goal in a 2–2 draw with Canada in the group stages. He also scored in a penalty shootout in the Round of 16 against Argentina. England won the shootout 4–2 before losing 3–2 to Germany in the quarter-finals.

He has previously been a part of the England national under-19 football team, having been capped five times and scoring one goal.

== Career statistics ==
As of match played 8 January 2022

Appearances and goals by club, season and competition
Club	Season	League			National Cup		League Cup		Other		Total	
Club	Season	Division	Apps	Goals	Apps	Goals	Apps	Goals	Apps	Goals	Apps	Goals
Liverpool	2012–13	Premier League	0	0	—		0	0	3 (Note: Appearances in the UEFA Europa League)	0	3	0
Liverpool	2013–14	Premier League	0	0	0	0	0	0	—		0	0
Liverpool	Total		0	0	0	0	0	0	3	0	3	0
Rotherham United (loan)	2012–13	League Two	1	0	1	0	—		—		2	0
Yeovil Town (loan)	2013–14	Championship	4	0	0	0	—		—		4	0
Yeovil Town	2013–14	Championship	8	0	1	0	—		—		9	0
Yeovil Town	2014–15	League One	6	1	0	0	0	0	0	0	6	1
Yeovil Town	Total		14	1	1	0	0	0	0	0	15	1
St Johnstone (loan)	2014–15	Scottish Premiership	5	0	0	0	0	0	—		5	0
Accrington Stanley	2015–16	League Two	2	0	0	0	0	0	1 (Note: Appearance in the Football League Trophy)	0	3	0
Hemel Hempstead Town	2015–16	National League South	4	0	—		—		—		4	0
Colwyn Bay	2015–16	Northern Premier League Premier Division	5	2	—		—		—		5	2
Curzon Ashton	2016–17	National League North	5	3	3	6	—		1 (Note: Appearance in the FA Trophy)	0	9	9
FC Halifax Town	2016–17	National League North	19	9	—		—		0	0	19	9
FC Halifax Town	2017–18	National League	20	4	1	0	—		0	0	21	4
FC Halifax Town	Total		39	13	1	0	—		0	0	40	13
Sligo Rovers	2018	League of Ireland Premier Division	16	4	0	0	2	1	—		18	5
Curzon Ashton	2018–19	National League North	10	2	2	1	—		0	0	12	3
Mossley	2019–20	Northern Premier League Division One North West	10	5	2	1	—		1 (Note: Appearance in the Northern Premier League Challenge Cup)	0	13	6
Widnes	2019–20	Northern Premier League Division One North West	0	0	—		—		0	0	0	0
Romford	2019–20	Isthmian League North Division	12	8	—		—		1 (Note: Appearance in the Alan Turvey Trophy)	0	13	8
Chelmsford City	2020–21	National League South	15	6	1	0	—		1	1	17	7
Chelmsford City	2021–22	National League South	10	2	1	0	—		0	0	11	2
Chelmsford City	Total		25	8	2	0	—		1	1	28	9
Braintree Town	2021–22	National League South	3	0	—		—		1	0	4	0
Career total			155	46	12	8	2	1	9	1	178	56
