= 2012–13 Liverpool F.C. season =

English football club season

Liverpool F.C.
2012–13 season
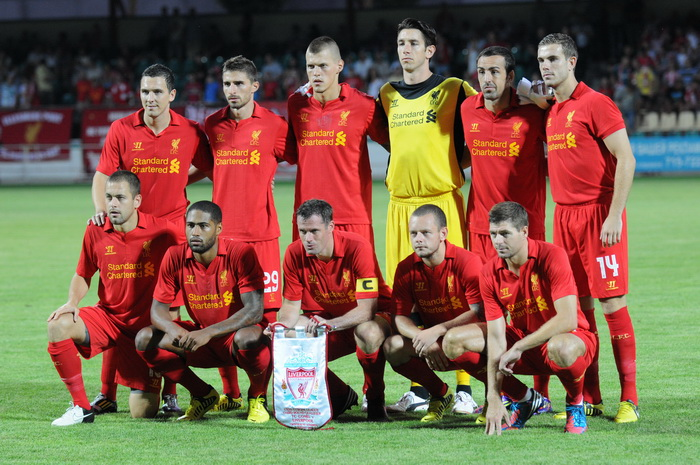
- Liverpool players before a UEFA Europa League match against FC Gomel in August 2012
- Owner: Fenway Sports Group
- Chairman: Tom Werner
- Manager: Brendan Rodgers
- Stadium: Anfield
- Premier League: 7th
- FA Cup: Fourth round
- League Cup: Fourth round
- UEFA Europa League: Round of 32
- Top goalscorer: League: Luis Suárez (23); All: Luis Suárez (30)
- Highest home attendance: 45,009 vs. Chelsea (21 April 2013, Premier League)
- Lowest home attendance: 37,521 vs. Swansea City (31 October 2012, League Cup)
- Average home league attendance: 43,668 (in all competitions)
Home colours	Away colours	Third colours

The 2012–13 season was the 121st season in Liverpool Football Club's existence, and their 51st consecutive year in the top flight of English football.

By virtue of winning the 2011–12 Football League Cup, Liverpool automatically qualified for entry into the 2012–13 UEFA Europa League, thus securing an immediate return to European competition.

Pre-season saw a change of manager for Liverpool, with Kenny Dalglish leaving on 16 May 2012. Brendan Rodgers was unveiled as his replacement on 1 June 2012. Liverpool finished 7th in the Premier League, one place and nine points higher than the 2011–12 season. According to the Forbes' list of the most valuable football clubs published in April 2013, Liverpool were ranked as the 10th most valuable football club in the world.

== First team ==
Last updated on 19 May 2013. Players' age as of 31 May 2013 (end of season)

Squad No.	Name	Nationality	Position	Date of birth (age)	Signed from	Signed in	Contract ends
Goalkeepers
1	Brad Jones	(Australia)	GK	19 March 1982 (aged 31)	Middlesbrough	2010	2015
25	Pepe Reina	(Spain)	GK	31 August 1982 (aged 30)	Villarreal	2005	2016
42	Péter Gulácsi	(Hungary)	GK	6 May 1990 (aged 23)	MTK	2008	2013
Defenders
2	Glen Johnson	(England)	RB/LB	23 August 1984 (aged 28)	Portsmouth	2009	2015
3	José Enrique	(Spain)	LB/LW	23 January 1986 (aged 27)	Newcastle United	2011	2015
5	Daniel Agger	(Denmark)	CB/LB	12 December 1984 (aged 28)	Brøndby	2006	2016
16	Sebastián Coates	(Uruguay)	CB	7 October 1990 (aged 22)	Nacional	2011	2016
23	Jamie Carragher	(England)	CB/RB	28 January 1978 (aged 35)	The Academy	1996	2013
34	Martin Kelly	(England)	RB/CB	27 April 1990 (aged 23)	The Academy	2008	2017
37	Martin Škrtel	(Slovakia)	CB	15 December 1984 (aged 28)	Zenit Saint Petersburg	2008	2016
38	Jon Flanagan	(England)	RB	1 January 1993 (aged 20)	The Academy	2010	2015
47	Andre Wisdom	(England)	RB/CB	9 May 1993 (aged 20)	The Academy	2010	2017
Midfielders
8	Steven Gerrard (c)	(England)	CM/AM	30 May 1980 (aged 33)	The Academy	1998	2014
10	Philippe Coutinho	(Brazil)	AM	12 June 1992 (aged 20)	Internazionale	2013	2017
11	Oussama Assaidi	(Morocco)	LW/RW	15 August 1988 (aged 24)	Heerenveen	2012	2016
14	Jordan Henderson	(England)	CM/RW/RB	17 June 1990 (aged 22)	Sunderland	2011	2016
19	Stewart Downing	(England)	LW/RW/LB	22 July 1984 (aged 28)	Aston Villa	2011	2015
21	Lucas	(Brazil)	DM	9 January 1987 (aged 26)	Grêmio	2007	2017
24	Joe Allen	(Wales)	DM/CM	14 March 1990 (aged 23)	Swansea City	2012	2017
30	Suso	(Spain)	AM	19 November 1993 (aged 19)	The Academy	2012	2017
31	Raheem Sterling	(England)	LW/RW	8 December 1994 (aged 18)	The Academy	2012	2017
33	Jonjo Shelvey	(England)	CM/AM	27 February 1992 (aged 21)	Charlton Athletic	2010	2016
35	Conor Coady	(England)	DM/CB	25 February 1993 (aged 20)	The Academy	2011	
44	Jordon Ibe	(England)	LW/RW	8 December 1995 (aged 17)	The Academy	2012	
Forwards
7	Luis Suárez	(Uruguay)	FW	24 January 1987 (aged 26)	Ajax	2011	2016
15	Daniel Sturridge	(England)	FW	1 September 1989 (aged 23)	Chelsea	2013	2016
29	Fabio Borini	(Italy)	FW	29 March 1991 (aged 22)	Roma	2012	2017
36	Samed Yeşil	(Germany)	FW	25 May 1994 (aged 19)	Bayer Leverkusen	2012	2016
48	Jerome Sinclair	(England)	FW	20 September 1996 (aged 16)	The Academy	2012	
50	Adam Morgan	(England)	FW	21 April 1994 (aged 19)	The Academy	2012	2014

== Transfers ==
=== Transfers in ===
First team

No.	Pos.	Nat.	Name	Age	EU	Moving from	Type	Transfer window	Ends	Transfer fee	Source
29	FW	(Italy)	Fabio Borini	21	EU	Roma (Italy)	Transfer	Summer	2017	£10,000,000	liverpoolfc.com
24	MF	(Wales)	Joe Allen	22	EU	Swansea City (Wales)	Transfer	Summer	2017	£15,000,000	liverpoolfc.com
11	LW	(Morocco)	Oussama Assaidi	24	EU	Heerenveen (Netherlands)	Transfer	Summer	2016	£2,400,000	liverpoolfc.com
15	FW	(England)	Daniel Sturridge	23	EU	Chelsea	Transfer	Winter	2017	£12,000,000	liverpoolfc.com
10	MF	(Brazil)	Philippe Coutinho	20	Non-EU	Internazionale (Italy)	Transfer	Winter	2017	£8,500,000	liverpoolfc.com

Last updated: 30 January 2013

Reserves and Academy

No.	Pos.	Nat.	Name	Age	EU	Moving from	Type	Transfer window	Ends	Transfer fee	Source
36	ST	(Germany)	Samed Yesil	18	EU	Bayer Leverkusen (Germany)	Transfer	Summer	2016	£1,000,000	liverpoolfc.com

Last updated: 30 August 2012

=== Loan in ===
First team

No.	Pos.	Nat.	Name	Age	EU	Moving from	Type	Transfer window	Ends	Transfer fee	Source
4	CM	(Turkey)	Nuri Şahin	23	EU	Real Madrid (Spain)	Loan	Summer	2013		liverpoolfc.com

Last updated: 25 August 2012

=== Transfers out ===
First team

No.	Pos.	Nat.	Name	Age	EU	Moving to	Type	Transfer window	Transfer fee	Source
6	LB	(Brazil)	Fábio Aurélio	32	Non-EU	Grêmio (Brazil)	Released	Summer		liverpoolfc.com
18	FW	(Netherlands)	Dirk Kuyt	31	EU	Fenerbahçe (Turkey)	Transfer	Summer	£850,000	liverpoolfc.com
11	AM	(Argentina)	Maxi Rodríguez	31	Non-EU	Newell's Old Boys (Argentina)	Transfer	Summer	Free	liverpoolfc.com
	CM	(Italy)	Alberto Aquilani	28	EU	Fiorentina (Italy)	Transfer	Summer	£7,600,000	liverpoolfc.com
39	FW	(Wales)	Craig Bellamy	33	EU	Cardiff City (Wales)	Transfer	Summer	Free	liverpoolfc.com
26	CM	(Scotland)	Charlie Adam	26	EU	Stoke City	Transfer	Summer	£4,000,000	liverpoolfc.com
10	AM	(England)	Joe Cole	31	EU	West Ham United	Released	Winter		liverpoolfc.com
4	CM	(Turkey)	Nuri Şahin	24	EU	Borussia Dortmund (Germany)	Loan end	Winter		liverpoolfc.com
32	GK	(Brazil)	Doni	33	Non-EU	Botafogo-SP (Brazil)	Released	Winter		liverpoolfc.com

Last updated: 19 May 2013

Reserves and Academy

No.	Pos.	Nat.	Name	Age	EU	Moving to	Type	Transfer window	Transfer fee	Source
	FW	(England)	David Amoo	21	EU	Preston North End	Released	Summer		liverpoolfc.com
	RB	(England)	Stephen Darby	23	EU	Bradford City	Released	Summer		liverpoolfc.com
	MF	(Portugal)	Toni Silva	18	EU	Barnsley	Released	Summer		liverpoolfc.com
36	ST	(England)	Nathan Eccleston	21	EU	Blackpool	Transfer	Summer	Free	liverpoolfc.com

Last updated: 31 August 2012

=== Loans out ===
First team

No.	Pos.	Nat.	Name	Age	EU	Moving to	Type	Transfer window	Transfer fee	Source
9	ST	(England)	Andy Carroll	23	EU	West Ham United	Loan	Summer		liverpoolfc.com
20	DM	(England)	Jay Spearing	23	EU	Bolton Wanderers	Loan	Summer		liverpoolfc.com

Last updated: 31 August 2012

Reserves and Academy

No.	Pos.	Nat.	Name	Age	EU	Moving to	Type	Transfer window	Transfer fee	Source
	ST	(United States)	Villyan Bijev	19	Non-EU	Start (Norway)	Loan	Summer		ikstart.no
	ST	(Democratic Republic of the Congo)	Henoc Mukendi	18	Non-EU	Northampton Town	Loan	Summer		liverpoolfc.com
22	DF	(Scotland)	Danny Wilson	20	EU	Bristol City	Loan			liverpoolfc.com
	GK	(England)	Jamie Stephens	19	EU	Airbus UK Broughton (Wales)	Loan	Winter		liverpoolfc.com
50	ST	(England)	Adam Morgan	18	EU	Rotherham United	Loan	Winter		liverpoolfc.com
22	DF	(Scotland)	Danny Wilson	21	EU	Heart of Midlothian (Scotland)	Loan	Winter		liverpoolfc.com
	ST	(England)	Michael Ngoo	20	EU	Heart of Midlothian (Scotland)	Loan	Winter		liverpoolfc.com
12	FW	(Spain)	Dani Pacheco	22	EU	SD Huesca (Spain)	Loan	Winter		liverpoolfc.com
49	DF	(England)	Jack Robinson	19	EU	Wolverhampton Wanderers	Loan			liverpoolfc.com

Last updated: 19 February 2013

=== Pre-season ===
21 July 2012 Friendly	Toronto FC	1–1	Liverpool	Toronto, Canada
21:00 BST	Amarikwa 58'	Report	Morgan 69'	Stadium: Rogers Centre; Attendance: 33,087; Referee: Paul Ward (Canada)

25 July 2012 Friendly	Roma	2–1	Liverpool	Boston, United States
23:30 BST	Bradley 63'; Florenzi 70'	Report	Adam 80'	Stadium: Fenway Park; Attendance: 37,169; Referee: Sorin Stoica (United States)

28 July 2012 Friendly	Tottenham Hotspur	0–0	Liverpool	Baltimore, United States
18:00 BST		Report		Stadium: M&T Bank Stadium; Attendance: 42,723; Referee: Jose Carlos Rivero (United States)

12 August 2012 Friendly	Liverpool	3–1	Bayer Leverkusen	Liverpool, England
15:00 BST	Sterling 3'; Lucas 29'; Carroll 65'	Report	Sam 75'	Stadium: Anfield; Attendance: 25,291; Referee: Martin Atkinson

Last updated: 12 August 2012.
Source: Liverpool F.C.

== Competitions ==
=== Overall record ===
Competition	First match	Last match	Starting round	Final position	Record							
Competition	First match	Last match	Starting round	Final position	Pld	W	D	L	GF	GA	GD	Win %
Premier League	18 August 2012	19 May 2013	Matchday 1	7th	38	16	13	9	71	43	+28	42.11
FA Cup	6 January 2013	27 January 2013	Third round	Fourth round	2	1	0	1	4	4	+0	50.00
League Cup	26 September 2012	31 October 2012	Third round	Fourth round	2	1	0	1	3	4	−1	50.00
UEFA Europa League	2 August 2012	21 February 2013	Third qualifying round	Round of 32	12	7	2	3	20	13	+7	58.33
Total					54	25	15	14	98	64	+34	46.30

Source: Soccerway

=== Premier League ===
==== League table ====
Pos	Team	Pld	W	D	L	GF	GA	GD	Pts	Qualification or relegation
5	Tottenham Hotspur	38	21	9	8	66	46	+20	72	Qualification for the Europa League play-off round
6	Everton	38	16	15	7	55	40	+15	63	
7	Liverpool	38	16	13	9	71	43	+28	61	
8	West Bromwich Albion	38	14	7	17	53	57	−4	49	
9	Swansea City	38	11	13	14	47	51	−4	46	Qualification for the Europa League third qualifying round (Note: Swansea City qualified for the Europa League third qualifying round as the 2012–13 Football League Cup winners.)

Source: Barclays Premier League
Rules for classification: 1) Points; 2) Goal difference; 3) Goals scored; 4) Play-offs (only if needed to decide champion, teams for relegation or teams for UEFA competitions).

==== Results summary ====
Overall								Home						Away					
Pld	W	D	L	GF	GA	GD	Pts	W	D	L	GF	GA	GD	W	D	L	GF	GA	GD
38	16	13	9	71	43	+28	61	9	6	4	33	16	+17	7	7	5	38	27	+11

Last updated: 19 May 2013.
Source: Premier League

==== Results by round ====
Round	1	2	3	4	5	6	7	8	9	10	11	12	13	14	15	16	17	18	19	20	21	22	23	24	25	26	27	28	29	30	31	32	33	34	35	36	37	38
Ground	A	H	H	A	H	A	H	H	A	H	A	H	A	A	H	A	H	H	A	A	H	A	H	A	A	H	H	A	H	A	A	H	A	H	A	H	A	H
Result	L	D	L	D	L	W	D	W	D	D	D	W	D	L	W	W	L	W	L	W	W	L	W	D	D	L	W	W	W	L	W	D	D	D	W	D	W	W
Position	18	16	18	17	18	14	14	11	12	12	13	11	11	12	11	10	12	8	10	9	8	8	7	7	7	9	8	7	6	7	7	7	7	7	7	7	7	7

Updated to match(es) played on 19 May 2013. Source: matches
A = Away; H = Home; W = Win; D = Draw; L = Loss

==== Matches ====
18 August 2012 1	West Bromwich Albion	3–0	Liverpool	West Bromwich
15:00 BST	Gera 43'; Odemwingie 64' (pen.); Lukaku 77'; Fortuné (yellow card) 75'	Report	Johnson (yellow card) 41'; Suárez (yellow card) 45+3'; Lucas (yellow card) 56'; Agger (red card) 58'; Carroll (yellow card) 90+3'	Stadium: The Hawthorns; Attendance: 26,039; Referee: Phil Dowd

26 August 2012 2	Liverpool	2–2	Manchester City	Liverpool
16:00 BST	Škrtel 34'; Suárez 66', (yellow card) 90+4'	Report	Y. Touré 63'; Tevez 80'	Stadium: Anfield; Attendance: 44,492; Referee: Andre Marriner

2 September 2012 3	Liverpool	0–2	Arsenal	Liverpool
13:30 BST	Škrtel (yellow card) 47'; Shelvey (yellow card) 90+1'	Report	Mertesacker (yellow card) 6'; Arteta (yellow card) 26'; Podolski 31'; Cazorla 68'	Stadium: Anfield; Attendance: 44,932; Referee: Howard Webb

15 September 2012 4	Sunderland	1–1	Liverpool	Sunderland
17:30 BST	Fletcher 29'; Larsson (yellow card) 81'	Report	Suárez (yellow card) 37', (goal) 71'; Škrtel (yellow card) 63'	Stadium: Stadium of Light; Attendance: 41,997; Referee: Martin Atkinson

23 September 2012 5	Liverpool	1–2	Manchester United	Liverpool
13:30 BST	Shelvey (red card) 39'; Gerrard 46'; Reina (yellow card) 77'	Report	Rafael 51'; Scholes (yellow card) 58'; Van Persie 81' (pen.), (yellow card) 84'	Stadium: Anfield; Attendance: 44,263; Referee: Mark Halsey

29 September 2012 6	Norwich City	2–5	Liverpool	Norwich
15:00 BST	Barnett (yellow card) 39'; Morison 60'; Holt 86'	Report	Suárez 2', 38', 56'; Şahin 47'; Barnett 68' (o.g.)	Stadium: Carrow Road; Attendance: 26,831; Referee: Mike Jones

7 October 2012 7	Liverpool	0–0	Stoke City	Liverpool
15:00 BST		Report	Kightly (yellow card) 24'; Huth (yellow card) 33'; Shawcross (yellow card) 70'; Adam (yellow card) 73'; Walters (yellow card) 77'; Whitehead (yellow card) 90'	Stadium: Anfield; Attendance: 44,531; Referee: Lee Mason

20 October 2012 8	Liverpool	1–0	Reading	Liverpool
15:00 BST	Sterling 29'; Agger (yellow card) 57'	Report	Mariappa (yellow card) 90+1'	Stadium: Anfield; Attendance: 44,874; Referee: Roger East

28 October 2012 9	Everton	2–2	Liverpool	Liverpool
13:30 BST	Osman (yellow card) 20', (goal) 22'; Naismith 35'; Neville (yellow card) 45+2'; Jagielka (yellow card) 57'; Coleman (yellow card) 86'	Report	Baines 14' (o.g.); Suárez 20', (yellow card) 71'; Sterling (yellow card) 29'; Agger (yellow card) 69'	Stadium: Goodison Park; Attendance: 39,613; Referee: Andre Marriner

4 November 2012 10	Liverpool	1–1	Newcastle United	Liverpool
16:00 GMT	Suárez 67'	Report	Cabaye 43'; Coloccini (red card) 84'; Santon (yellow card) 90+4'	Stadium: Anfield; Attendance: 44,803; Referee: Anthony Taylor

11 November 2012 11	Chelsea	1–1	Liverpool	London
16:00 GMT	Terry 20'; Mikel (yellow card) 79'	Report	Allen (yellow card) 50'; Johnson (yellow card) 56'; Gerrard (yellow card) 67'; Suárez 73'	Stadium: Stamford Bridge; Attendance: 41,627; Referee: Howard Webb

17 November 2012 12	Liverpool	3–0	Wigan Athletic	Liverpool
15:00 GMT	Suárez 47', 58'; José Enrique 65'	Report	Figueroa (yellow card) 39'; Caldwell (yellow card) 66'; Di Santo (yellow card) 66'	Stadium: Anfield; Attendance: 44,913; Referee: Kevin Friend

25 November 2012 13	Swansea City	0–0	Liverpool	Swansea
13:30 GMT	Chico (yellow card) 71'	Report		Stadium: Liberty Stadium; Attendance: 20,621; Referee: Jon Moss

28 November 2012 14	Tottenham Hotspur	2–1	Liverpool	London
19:45 GMT	Lennon 7'; Bale 16' (yellow card) 78'	Report	Škrtel (yellow card) 38'; Bale 72' (o.g.); José Enrique (yellow card) 90+1'	Stadium: White Hart Lane; Attendance: 36,162; Referee: Phil Dowd

1 December 2012 15	Liverpool	1–0	Southampton	Liverpool
15:00 GMT	Agger 43'; Suárez (yellow card) 81'; Carragher (yellow card) 90+2'	Report		Stadium: Anfield; Attendance: 44,525; Referee: Michael Oliver

9 December 2012 16	West Ham United	2–3	Liverpool	London
16:00 GMT	Noble 36' (pen.); Taylor (yellow card) 38'; Gerrard 43' (o.g.)	Report	Johnson 11'; Shelvey (yellow card) 31'; Gerrard (yellow card) 34'; Cole 76'; Shelvey 79'	Stadium: Boleyn Ground; Attendance: 35,005; Referee: Lee Probert

15 December 2012 17	Liverpool	1–3	Aston Villa	Liverpool
15:00 GMT	Gerrard 87'; Suárez (yellow card) 90'	Report	Benteke 29', 51', (yellow card) 88'; Weimann 40'; Lowton (yellow card) 65'	Stadium: Anfield; Attendance: 44,607; Referee: Neil Swarbrick

22 December 2012 18	Liverpool	4–0	Fulham	Liverpool
17:30 GMT	Škrtel 8'; Gerrard 36'; Downing 51'; Johnson (yellow card) 53'; Suárez 90+2'	Report	Dejagah (yellow card) 78'; Karagounis (yellow card) 85'	Stadium: Anfield; Attendance: 44,750; Referee: Mark Clattenburg

26 December 2012 19	Stoke City	3–1	Liverpool	Stoke-on-Trent
19:45 GMT	Shawcross (yellow card) 1'; Cameron (yellow card) 4'; Walters 5', 49'; Jones 12'; Whelan (yellow card) 86'	Report	Gerrard 2' (pen.); Suárez (yellow card) 61'	Stadium: Britannia Stadium; Attendance: 27,490; Referee: Howard Webb

30 December 2012 20	Queens Park Rangers	0–3	Liverpool	London
16:00 GMT	Mbia (yellow card) 57'; Fábio (yellow card) 90'	Report	Suárez 10', 16'; Agger 28'; Lucas (yellow card) 83'	Stadium: Loftus Road; Attendance: 18,304; Referee: Anthony Taylor

2 January 2013 21	Liverpool	3–0	Sunderland	Liverpool
19:45 GMT	Sterling 19'; Suárez 26', 52'	Report	McClean (yellow card) 60'	Stadium: Anfield; Attendance: 44,228; Referee: Phil Dowd

13 January 2013 22	Manchester United	2–1	Liverpool	Manchester
13:30 GMT	Van Persie 19'; Vidić 54'; Evra (yellow card) 73'	Report	Lucas (yellow card) 45+4'; Škrtel (yellow card) 53'; Sturridge 57'; Johnson (yellow card) 76'; Agger (yellow card) 90+4'	Stadium: Old Trafford; Attendance: 75,501; Referee: Howard Webb

19 January 2013 23	Liverpool	5–0	Norwich City	Liverpool
15:00 GMT	Henderson 26'; Suárez 36'; Johnson (yellow card) 42'; Sturridge 59'; Gerrard 66'; Bennett 74' (o.g.)	Report	Snodgrass (yellow card) 80'	Stadium: Anfield; Attendance: 44,901; Referee: Michael Oliver

30 January 2013 24	Arsenal	2–2	Liverpool	London
19:45 GMT	Cazorla (yellow card) 25'; Giroud 64', (yellow card) 85'; Walcott 67'; Mertesacker (yellow card) 90'	Report	Suárez 5'; Henderson 60'; Gerrard (yellow card) 73'	Stadium: Emirates Stadium; Attendance: 60,089; Referee: Kevin Friend

3 February 2013 25	Manchester City	2–2	Liverpool	Manchester
16:00 GMT	Džeko 23' (yellow card) 30'; García (yellow card) 71'; Agüero 78'	Report	Sturridge 29', (yellow card) 53'; Henderson (yellow card) 36'; Carragher (yellow card) 57'; Gerrard 73', (yellow card) 81'	Stadium: Etihad Stadium; Attendance: 47,301; Referee: Anthony Taylor

11 February 2013 26	Liverpool	0–2	West Bromwich Albion	Liverpool
20:00 GMT	Gerrard (penalty missed) 77'; Suárez (yellow card) 90+4'	Report	Reid (yellow card) 42'; Ridgewell (yellow card) 69'; Morrison (yellow card) 72'; Brunt (yellow card) 73'; McAuley 81'; Lukaku 90'	Stadium: Anfield; Attendance: 44,752; Referee: Jonathan Moss

17 February 2013 27	Liverpool	5–0	Swansea City	Liverpool
15:00 GMT	Gerrard 34' (pen.); Coutinho 46'; José Enrique 50'; Suárez 56'; Sturridge 71' (pen.)	Report	Hernández (yellow card) 76'	Stadium: Anfield; Attendance: 44,832; Referee: Howard Webb

2 March 2013 28	Wigan Athletic	0–4	Liverpool	Wigan
17:30 GMT	Caldwell (yellow card) 35'; McArthur (yellow card) 59'	Report	Downing 2'; Suárez 18', 34', 49'; Allen (yellow card) 44'; Lucas (yellow card) 45+3'	Stadium: DW Stadium; Attendance: 20,804; Referee: Martin Atkinson

10 March 2013 29	Liverpool	3–2	Tottenham Hotspur	Liverpool
16:00 GMT	Suárez 21'; Downing 66'; Gerrard 82' (pen.); Carragher (yellow card) 83'	Report	Vertonghen 45', 53' (yellow card) 57'	Stadium: Anfield; Attendance: 44,752; Referee: Michael Oliver

16 March 2013 30	Southampton	3–1	Liverpool	Southampton
15:00 GMT	Schneiderlin 6'; Lambert 33'; Rodriguez 80'	Report	Coutinho 45+1'; Suárez (yellow card) 90+2'	Stadium: St Mary's Stadium; Attendance: 32,070; Referee: Phil Dowd

31 March 2013 31	Aston Villa	1–2	Liverpool	Birmingham
13:30 BST	Benteke 31'; Westwood (yellow card) 90+1'	Report	Henderson 47'; Gerrard (yellow card) 48' (goal) 60' (pen.)	Stadium: Villa Park; Attendance: 42,037; Referee: Lee Mason

7 April 2013 32	Liverpool	0–0	West Ham United	Liverpool
13:30 BST		Report	O'Brien (yellow card) 85'	Stadium: Anfield; Attendance: 45,007; Referee: Anthony Taylor

13 April 2013 33	Reading	0–0	Liverpool	Reading
15:00 BST	Guthrie (yellow card) 51'; Carriço (yellow card) 88'	Report	Lucas (yellow card) 42'	Stadium: Madejski Stadium; Attendance: 24,139; Referee: Mark Clattenburg

21 April 2013 34	Liverpool	2–2	Chelsea	Liverpool
16:00 BST	Henderson (yellow card) 29'; Sturridge 52'; Lucas (yellow card) 54'; Suárez (yellow card) 56' (goal) 90+7'; Carragher (yellow card) 64'; Shelvey (yellow card) 82'	Report	Oscar 26'; Torres (yellow card) 38'; Azpilicueta (yellow card) 53'; Hazard 57' (pen.)	Stadium: Anfield; Attendance: 45,009; Referee: Kevin Friend

27 April 2013 35	Newcastle United	0–6	Liverpool	Newcastle
17:30 BST	Debuchy (yellow card) 20' (red card) 75'; Gutiérrez (yellow card) 39'; Taylor (yellow card) 44'	Report	Agger 3'; Henderson 17', 76'; Sturridge (yellow card) 20', (goal) 54', 60'; Johnson (yellow card) 41'; Borini 74'	Stadium: St James' Park; Attendance: 52,351; Referee: Andre Marriner

5 May 2013 36	Liverpool	0–0	Everton	Liverpool
13:30 BST	Borini (yellow card) 88'	Report	Anichebe (yellow card) 56'; Osman (yellow card) 90+1'	Stadium: Anfield; Attendance: 44,991; Referee: Michael Oliver

12 May 2013 37	Fulham	1–3	Liverpool	London
15:00 BST	Berbatov 33'	Report	Sturridge 36', 62', 85'; Johnson (yellow card) 52'	Stadium: Craven Cottage; Attendance: 25,640; Referee: Mark Halsey

19 May 2013 38	Liverpool	1–0	Queens Park Rangers	Liverpool
16:00 BST	Henderson (yellow card) 8'; Coutinho 23'	Report	Hill (yellow card) 32'; Derry (yellow card) 67'; Townsend (yellow card) 72'	Stadium: Anfield; Attendance: 44,792; Referee: Martin Atkinson

Last updated: 19 May 2013.
Source: Liverpool F.C.

=== FA Cup ===
6 January 2013 Third round	Mansfield Town	1–2	Liverpool	Mansfield
16:00 GMT	Green 79'; Beevers (yellow card) 37'	Report	Sturridge 7', (yellow card) 47'; Suárez 59'; Lucas (yellow card) 38'; Flanagan (yellow card) 89'	Stadium: One Call Stadium; Attendance: 7,574; Referee: Andre Marriner

27 January 2013 Fourth round	Oldham Athletic	3–2	Liverpool	Oldham
16:00 GMT	Simpson (yellow card) 9'; Smith 3', 45+3', (yellow card) 72'; Wabara (yellow card) 23' (goal) 48'	Report	Sterling (yellow card) 6'; Suárez 17'; Allen 80'	Stadium: Boundary Park; Attendance: 10,295; Referee: Lee Probert

Last updated: 27 January 2013.
Source: Liverpool F.C.

=== League Cup ===
26 September 2012 Third round	West Bromwich Albion	1–2	Liverpool	West Bromwich
20:00 BST	Tamaș 3'; Mulumbu (yellow card) 38'	Report	Şahin 17', 82'; Wisdom (yellow card) 42'	Stadium: The Hawthorns; Attendance: 21,164; Referee: Michael Oliver

31 October 2012 Fourth round	Liverpool	1–3	Swansea City	Liverpool
20:00 GMT	Carragher (yellow card) 45'; Suárez 76'	Report	Flores 34'; Dyer 72'; De Guzmán 90+4'	Stadium: Anfield; Attendance: 37,521; Referee: Lee Probert

Last updated: 31 October 2012.
Source: Liverpool F.C.

=== UEFA Europa League ===
==== Third qualifying round ====
2 August 2012 First leg	Gomel (Belarus)	0–1	(England) Liverpool	Gomel, Belarus
19:00 BST	Klimovich (yellow card) 3'; Alumona (yellow card) 51'	Report	Henderson (yellow card) 45'; Downing 67'; Jones (yellow card) 88'	Stadium: Central Stadium; Attendance: 12,220; Referee: Ivan Kružliak (Slovakia)

9 August 2012 Second leg	Liverpool (England)	3–0 (4–0 agg.)	(Belarus) Gomel	Liverpool, England
20:05 BST	Borini 21'; Gerrard 41'; Shelvey (yellow card) 59'; Johnson 71'	Report		Stadium: Anfield; Attendance: 43,256; Referee: Kenn Hansen (Denmark)

==== Play-off round ====
23 August 2012 First leg	Heart of Midlothian (Scotland)	0–1	(England) Liverpool	Edinburgh, Scotland
19:45 BST	Barr (yellow card) 24'	Report	Webster 78' (o.g.)	Stadium: Tynecastle Stadium; Attendance: 15,965; Referee: Florian Meyer (Germany)

30 August 2012 Second leg	Liverpool (England)	1–1 (2–1 agg.)	(Scotland) Heart of Midlothian	Liverpool, England
20:05 BST	Suárez 88'	Report	Barr (yellow card) 81'; Templeton 84'; Grainger (yellow card) 86'	Stadium: Anfield; Attendance: 44,361; Referee: Vladislav Bezborodov (Russia)

==== Group stage ====
Group A
Team	Pld	W	D	L	GF	GA	GD	Pts
(England) Liverpool	6	3	1	2	11	9	+2	10
(Russia) Anzhi Makhackhala	6	3	1	2	7	5	+2	10
(Switzerland) Young Boys	6	3	1	2	14	13	+1	10
(Italy) Udinese	6	1	1	4	7	12	-5	4

20 September 2012 1	Young Boys (Switzerland)	3–5	(England) Liverpool	Bern, Switzerland
18:00 BST	Raimondi (yellow card) 17'; Nuzzolo 38', (yellow card) 39'; Ojala 52'; Zárate 63'; Veškovac (yellow card) 80'; Bobadilla (yellow card) 85'	Report	Ojala 4' (o.g.); Wisdom 40'; Coates 67'; Shelvey 76', 88'; Borini (yellow card) 82'	Stadium: Stade de Suisse; Attendance: 31,120; Referee: Michael Koukoulakis (Greece)

4 October 2012 2	Liverpool (England)	2–3	(Italy) Udinese	Liverpool, England
20:05 BST	Shelvey 23'; Suárez 75'	Report	Di Natale 46'; Benatia (yellow card) 66'; Pinzi (yellow card) 68'; Coates 70' (o.g.); Pasquale 72'; Faraoni (yellow card) 90+1'	Stadium: Anfield; Attendance: 40,092; Referee: Stefan Johannesson (Sweden)

25 October 2012 3	Liverpool (England)	1–0	(Russia) Anzhi Makhachkala	Liverpool, England
20:05 BST	Downing 53'; Suárez (yellow card) 75'; Agger (yellow card) 81'	Report	Samba (yellow card) 21'; Agalarov (yellow card) 43'	Stadium: Anfield; Attendance: 39,358; Referee: Bas Nijhuis (Netherlands)

8 November 2012 4	Anzhi Makhachkala (Russia)	1–0	(England) Liverpool	Moscow, Russia
18:00 GMT	Traoré 45+1'	Report	Flanagan (yellow card) 65'; Shelvey (yellow card) 88'	Stadium: Lokomotiv Stadium; Attendance: 15,000; Referee: David Fernández Borbalán (Spain)

22 November 2012 5	Liverpool (England)	2–2	(Switzerland) Young Boys	Liverpool, England
20:05 GMT	Shelvey 33'; Cole 72'; Şahin (yellow card) 78'	Report	Bobadilla 52'; Zverotić 88', (yellow card) 89'	Stadium: Anfield; Attendance: 37,810; Referee: Alon Yefet (Israel)

6 December 2012 6	Udinese (Italy)	0–1	(England) Liverpool	Udine, Italy
18:00 GMT	Fabbrini (yellow card) 17'; Pasquale (yellow card) 67' (yellow-red card) 79'; Badu (yellow card) 80'	Report	Henderson 23'; Suso (yellow card) 36'; Allen (yellow card) 71'; Carragher (yellow card) 82'	Stadium: Stadio Friuli; Attendance: 12,000; Referee: Duarte Gomes (Portugal)

==== Knockout phase ====
===== Round of 32 =====
14 February 2013 First leg	Zenit Saint Petersburg (Russia)	2–0	(England) Liverpool	Saint Petersburg, Russia
17:00 GMT	Hubočan (yellow card) 59'; Hulk 70'; Semak 72'; Neto (yellow card) 84'	Report	Škrtel (yellow card) 17'	Stadium: Petrovsky Stadium; Attendance: 21,000; Referee: Carlos Velasco Carballo (Spain)

21 February 2013 Second leg	Liverpool (England)	3–1 (3–3 (a) agg.)	(Russia) Zenit Saint Petersburg	Liverpool, England
20:05 GMT	Suárez 28', 59'; Allen 43'; Shelvey (yellow card) 66'	Report	Hulk 19'; Denisov (yellow card) 27'	Stadium: Anfield; Attendance: 43,026; Referee: Björn Kuipers (Netherlands)

Last updated: 21 February 2013.
Source: Liverpool F.C.

== Statistics ==
=== Appearances and goals ===
No.	Pos	Name	Premier League				FA Cup				League Cup				Europe				Total			
No.	Pos	Name	App	Sta	Gol	Ass	App	Sta	Gol	Ass	App	Sta	Gol	Ass	App	Sta	Gol	Ass	App	Sta	Gol	Ass
1	GK	(Australia) Brad Jones	7	7	0	0	2	2	0	0	2	2	0	0	4	4	0	0	15	15	0	0
2	DF	(England) Glen Johnson	36	36	1	5	0	0	0	0	0	0	0	0	7	7	1	0	43	43	2	5
3	DF	(Spain) José Enrique	29	25	2	6	0	0	0	0	0	0	0	0	6	6	0	1	35	31	2	7
5	DF	(Denmark) Daniel Agger	35	35	3	0	0	0	0	0	0	0	0	0	4	4	0	1	39	39	3	1
7	FW	(Uruguay) Luis Suárez	33	33	23	9	2	1	2	0	1	0	1	0	8	6	4	1	44	40	30	10
8	MF	(England) Steven Gerrard	36	36	9	9	1	0	0	0	1	0	0	1	8	6	1	2	46	42	10	12
10	MF	(Brazil) Philippe Coutinho	13	12	3	7	0	0	0	0	0	0	0	0	0	0	0	0	13	12	3	7
11	MF	(Morocco) Oussama Assaidi	4	0	0	0	0	0	0	0	2	2	0	1	6	4	0	0	12	6	0	1
14	MF	(England) Jordan Henderson	30	16	5	4	2	1	0	0	2	2	0	0	10	10	1	2	44	29	6	6
15	FW	(England) Daniel Sturridge	14	11	10	4	2	2	1	0	0	0	0	0	0	0	0	0	16	13	11	4
16	DF	(Uruguay) Sebastián Coates	5	2	0	0	2	2	0	0	2	2	0	0	3	3	1	0	12	9	1	0
19	MF	(England) Stewart Downing	29	25	3	6	2	1	0	0	2	2	0	0	12	11	2	2	45	39	5	8
21	MF	(Brazil) Lucas	26	24	0	1	1	1	0	0	0	0	0	0	4	2	0	0	31	27	0	1
23	DF	(England) Jamie Carragher	24	16	0	1	1	1	0	0	2	2	0	0	11	10	0	0	38	29	0	1
24	MF	(Wales) Joe Allen	27	21	0	0	2	2	1	0	1	1	0	0	7	5	1	0	37	29	2	0
25	GK	(Spain) Pepe Reina	31	31	0	0	0	0	0	0	0	0	0	0	8	8	0	0	39	39	0	0
29	FW	(Italy) Fabio Borini	13	5	1	0	1	1	0	0	0	0	0	0	6	4	1	1	20	9	2	1
30	MF	(Spain) Suso	14	8	0	0	1	1	0	0	1	0	0	0	4	3	0	1	20	12	0	1
31	MF	(England) Raheem Sterling	24	19	2	5	1	1	0	0	1	0	0	0	10	2	0	0	36	22	2	5
33	MF	(England) Jonjo Shelvey	19	9	1	0	2	1	0	1	1	1	0	0	10	7	4	1	32	18	5	2
34	DF	(England) Martin Kelly	4	4	0	0	0	0	0	0	0	0	0	0	3	2	0	1	7	6	0	1
35	MF	(England) Conor Coady	1	0	0	0	0	0	0	0	0	0	0	0	1	1	0	0	2	1	0	0
36	FW	(Germany) Samed Yesil	0	0	0	0	0	0	0	0	2	2	0	0	0	0	0	0	2	2	0	0
37	DF	(Slovakia) Martin Škrtel	25	23	2	0	1	1	0	1	0	0	0	0	7	7	0	0	33	31	2	1
38	DF	(England) Jon Flanagan	0	0	0	0	1	0	0	0	0	0	0	0	1	1	0	0	2	1	0	0
44	MF	(England) Jordon Ibe	1	1	0	1	0	0	0	0	0	0	0	0	0	0	0	0	1	1	0	1
47	DF	(England) Andre Wisdom	12	12	0	1	2	2	0	0	1	1	0	1	4	4	1	0	19	19	1	2
48	FW	(England) Jerome Sinclair	0	0	0	0	0	0	0	0	1	0	0	0	0	0	0	0	1	0	0	0
50	FW	(England) Adam Morgan	0	0	0	0	0	0	0	0	0	0	0	0	3	2	0	0	3	2	0	0
–	–	Own goals	–	–	4	–	–	–	0	–	–	–	0	–	–	–	2	–	–	–	6	-
–	–	Totals	–	–	71	59	–	–	4	2	–	–	3	3	–	–	20	15	–	–	98	77
Players who are on loan/left Liverpool that have appeared this season:
4	MF	(Turkey) Nuri Şahin	7	7	1	2	0	0	0	0	1	1	2	0	4	4	0	1	12	12	3	3
9	FW	(England) Andy Carroll	2	0	0	0	0	0	0	0	0	0	0	0	0	0	0	0	2	0	0	0
10	MF	(England) Joe Cole	6	0	1	0	0	0	0	0	1	1	0	0	3	3	1	1	10	4	2	1
12	MF	(Spain) Dani Pacheco	0	0	0	0	0	0	0	0	1	1	0	0	2	1	0	0	3	2	0	0
20	MF	(England) Jay Spearing	0	0	0	0	0	0	0	0	0	0	0	0	3	2	0	0	3	2	0	0
26	MF	(Scotland) Charlie Adam	0	0	0	0	0	0	0	0	0	0	0	0	2	1	0	0	2	1	0	0
49	DF	(England) Jack Robinson	0	0	0	0	2	2	0	0	2	2	0	0	2	2	0	0	6	6	0	0

=== Goalscorers ===
Includes all competitive matches. The list is sorted by shirt number when total goals are equal.

Last updated on 19 May 2013

Rank	Pos	No.	Player	Premier League	FA Cup	League Cup	Europa League	Total
1	FW	7	(Uruguay) Luis Suárez	23	2	1	4	30
2	FW	15	(England) Daniel Sturridge	10	1	0	0	11
3	MF	8	(England) Steven Gerrard	9	0	0	1	10
4	MF	14	(England) Jordan Henderson	5	0	0	1	6
5	MF	19	(England) Stewart Downing	3	0	0	2	5
5	MF	33	(England) Jonjo Shelvey	1	0	0	4	5
7	MF	4	(Turkey) Nuri Şahin^^	1	0	2	0	3
7	DF	5	(Denmark) Daniel Agger	3	0	0	0	3
7	MF	10	(Brazil) Philippe Coutinho	3	0	0	0	3
10	DF	2	(England) Glen Johnson	1	0	0	1	2
10	DF	3	(Spain) José Enrique	2	0	0	0	2
10	MF	10	(England) Joe Cole^^	1	0	0	1	2
10	MF	24	(Wales) Joe Allen	0	1	0	1	2
10	FW	29	(Italy) Fabio Borini	1	0	0	1	2
10	MF	31	(England) Raheem Sterling	2	0	0	0	2
10	DF	37	(Slovakia) Martin Škrtel	2	0	0	0	2
17	DF	16	(Uruguay) Sebastián Coates	0	0	0	1	1
17	DF	47	(England) Andre Wisdom	0	0	0	1	1
Own Goals				4	0	0	2	6
TOTALS				71	4	3	20	98

^^ Players who no longer play for Liverpool's current season

=== Clean sheets ===
Includes all competitive matches. The list is sorted by shirt number when total clean sheets are equal.

Last updated on 19 May 2013

Rank	Pos	No.	Player	Premier League	FA Cup	League Cup	Europa League	Total
1	GK	25	(Spain) Pepe Reina	14	0	0	3	17
2	GK	1	(Australia) Brad Jones	2	0	0	2	4
TOTALS				16	0	0	5	21

=== Disciplinary record ===
Includes all competitive matches. The list is sorted by shirt number when total bookings are equal.

Last updated on 19 May 2013

Rank	Pos.	No.	Player	Premier League		League Cup		FA Cup		Europa League		Total	
Rank	Pos.	No.	Player	Yellow card	Red card	Yellow card	Red card	Yellow card	Red card	Yellow card	Red card	Yellow card	Red card
1	FW	7	(Uruguay) Luis Suárez	10	0	0	0	0	0	1	0	11	0
2	MF	33	(England) Jonjo Shelvey	3	1	0	0	0	0	3	0	6	1
3	DF	5	(Denmark) Daniel Agger	3	1	0	0	0	0	1	0	4	1
4	DF	2	(England) Glen Johnson	7	0	0	0	0	0	0	0	7	0
4	MF	21	(Brazil) Lucas	6	0	0	0	1	0	0	0	7	0
6	DF	23	(England) Jamie Carragher	4	0	1	0	0	0	1	0	6	0
7	MF	8	(England) Steven Gerrard	5	0	0	0	0	0	0	0	5	0
7	DF	37	(Slovakia) Martin Škrtel	4	0	0	0	0	0	1	0	5	0
9	MF	14	(England) Jordan Henderson	3	0	0	0	0	0	1	0	4	0
10	FW	15	(England) Daniel Sturridge	2	0	0	0	1	0	0	0	3	0
10	MF	24	(Wales) Joe Allen	2	0	0	0	0	0	1	0	3	0
12	FW	29	(Italy) Fabio Borini	1	0	0	0	0	0	1	0	2	0
12	MF	31	(England) Raheem Sterling	1	0	0	0	1	0	0	0	2	0
12	DF	38	(England) Jon Flanagan	0	0	0	0	1	0	1	0	2	0
15	GK	1	(Australia) Brad Jones	0	0	0	0	0	0	1	0	1	0
15	DF	3	(Spain) José Enrique	1	0	0	0	0	0	0	0	1	0
15	MF	4	(Turkey) Nuri Şahin^^	0	0	0	0	0	0	1	0	1	0
15	FW	9	(England) Andy Carroll^^	1	0	0	0	0	0	0	0	1	0
15	GK	25	(Spain) Pepe Reina	1	0	0	0	0	0	0	0	1	0
15	MF	30	(Spain) Suso	0	0	0	0	0	0	1	0	1	0
15	DF	47	(England) Andre Wisdom	0	0	1	0	0	0	0	0	1	0
TOTALS				54	2	2	0	4	0	14	0	74	2

^^ Players who no longer play for Liverpool's current season
