= José Enrique (footballer, born 1986) =

Spanish footballer (born 1986)

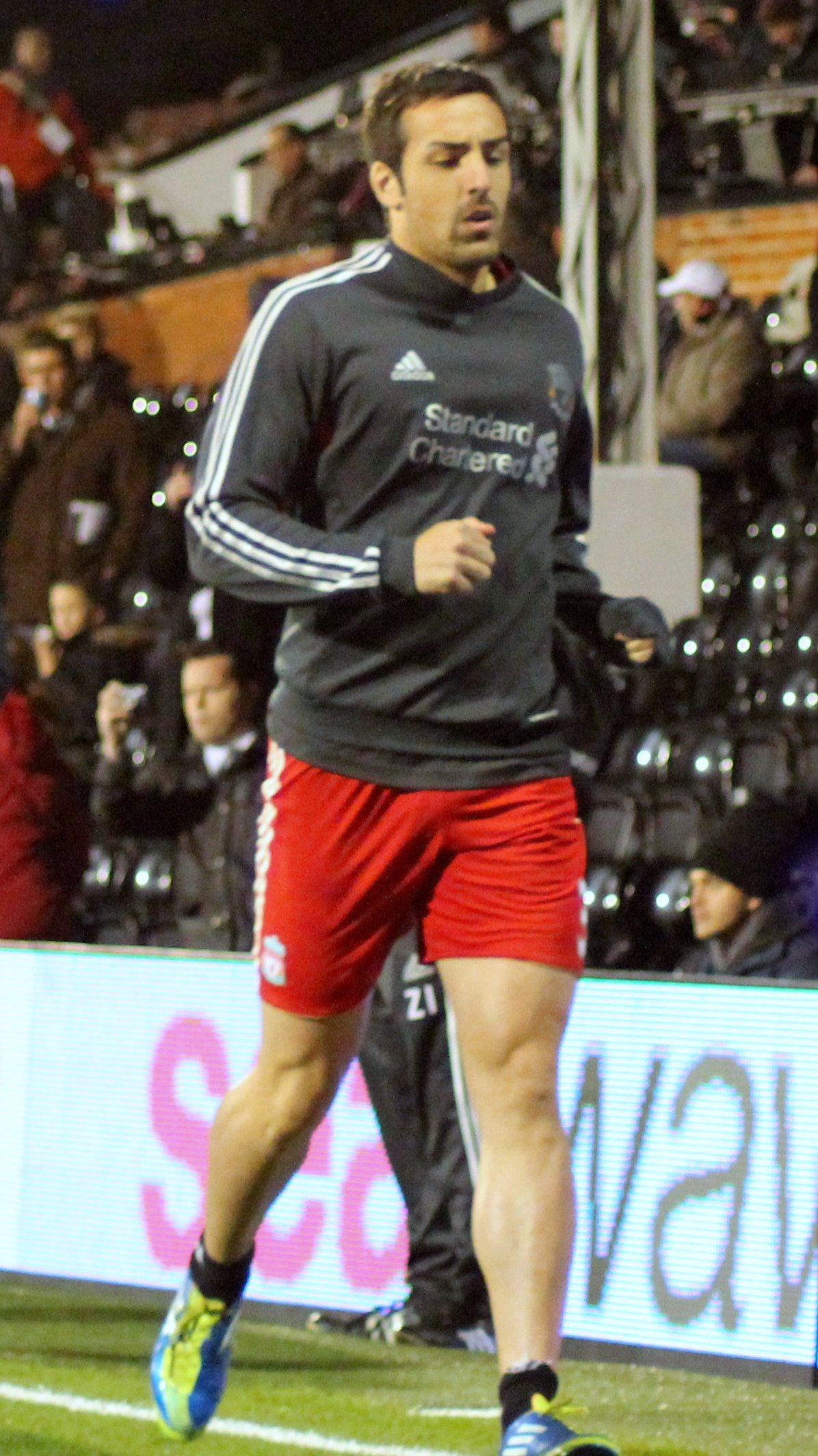
- José Enrique warming up for Liverpool in 2011

Personal information
- Full name: José Enrique Sánchez Díaz
- Date of birth: 23 January 1986 (age 40)
- Place of birth: Valencia, Spain
- Height: 1.84 m (6 ft 0 in)
- Position: Left-back

Youth career
- –2004: Levante

Senior career*
Years	Team	Apps	(Gls)
2004–2005	Levante B	19	(1)
2005–2006	Valencia	0	(0)
2005–2006	→ Celta (loan)	14	(0)
2006–2007	Villarreal	23	(0)
2007–2011	Newcastle United	119	(1)
2011–2016	Liverpool	76	(2)
2016–2017	Zaragoza	27	(1)
Total		278	(5)

International career
2001	Spain U16	2	(0)
2005	Spain U20	4	(0)
2006–2008	Spain U21	3	(1)
- * Club domestic league appearances and goals

José Enrique Sánchez Díaz (born 23 January 1986), known as José Enrique, is a Spanish former professional footballer who played as a left-back.

Starting his career with Levante, José Enrique was signed by their rivals Valencia and made La Liga appearances for Celta Vigo and Villarreal. He then spent nine years in England with Newcastle United and Liverpool, totalling 161 Premier League appearances. With the latter club, he won the Football League Cup and lost the FA Cup final in 2012. He retired through injury in 2017, after a year back in Spain with Real Zaragoza.

== Club career ==
=== Early life and career ===
José Enrique was born in Valencia. He began his football career at hometown club Levante before being acquired by rivals Valencia, who sent him to Celta Vigo for a season-long loan. At the conclusion of this loan spell, he was signed by Villarreal in 2006.

=== Newcastle United ===
On 6 August 2007, José Enrique signed for English Premier League club Newcastle United for a fee believed to be £6.3 million. He signed a five-year contract with the club. He made his Newcastle debut on 29 August against Barnsley in which he played the full 90 minutes in a 2–0 victory, and his Premier League debut as a substitute against West Ham United on 23 September.

José Enrique's performances were rewarded when he was made the official Newcastle United Player of the Season for 2009–10, voted for by the fans. He also achieved the accolade of being named in the PFA Team of the Year alongside Newcastle teammates Fabricio Coloccini, Kevin Nolan and Andy Carroll. José Enrique scored his only goal for the club in a 2–0 league win over Nottingham Forest on 29 March 2010. He made 36 Premier League appearances for Newcastle in the 2010–11 season.

=== Liverpool ===
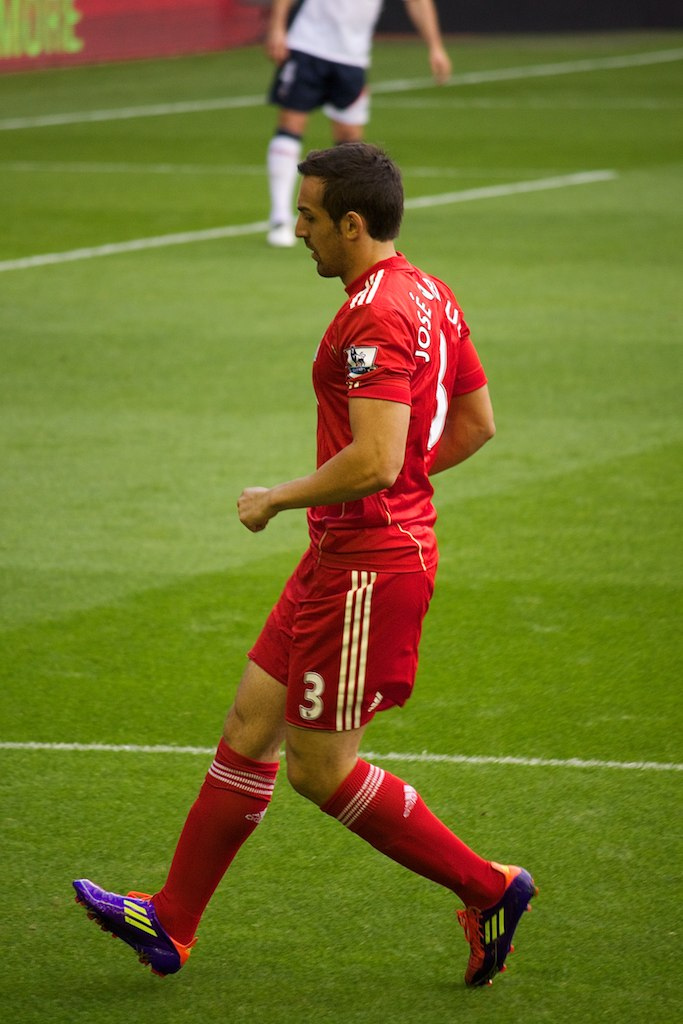
José Enrique playing for Liverpool in 2011

On 12 August 2011, José Enrique signed for Liverpool for a reported fee of £6 million. He made his debut two days later in Liverpool's first game of the 2011–12 Premier League season, starting in a 1–1 draw against Sunderland. On 26 February 2012, he helped Liverpool win the 2012 Football League Cup Final against Cardiff City, their first honour since 2006. On 1 April, he was forced to play as a goalkeeper for the remaining 13 minutes of the match against his old club Newcastle after Pepe Reina was sent off for headbutting James Perch. Although José Enrique kept a clean sheet, Liverpool, being down 2–0 at the time of Reina's red card, failed to level the score. He also played in the 2012 FA Cup Final on 5 May, a 2–1 loss to Chelsea.

On 17 November 2012, in a league match against Wigan Athletic, José Enrique scored his first goal for Liverpool in the 65th minute, having been increasingly reinvented as a left wing-back in a 3–5–2 formation under manager Brendan Rodgers. On 1 October 2014, he made his UEFA Champions League debut for Liverpool against Basel in Switzerland, playing the full 90 minutes in a 1–0 defeat.

In his final three seasons at Liverpool, José Enrique made only 21 total appearances, 12 of which were in the league. He was hampered by a persistent injury to his right knee, and the side-effects of medication to deal with it. He captained the club in his final appearances, against Exeter City in the FA Cup in January 2016. José Enrique was released by Liverpool at the end of the 2015–16 season.

=== Real Zaragoza ===
On 7 September 2016, José Enrique signed for Segunda División club Real Zaragoza on a two-year contract. He made his debut on 8 October, playing the full 90 minutes of a 2–1 loss away to Sevilla Atlético, and scored his first goal on 5 November in a 2–2 draw away to RCD Mallorca.

On 6 September 2017, José Enrique announced his retirement from football due to a persistent knee injury.

== Personal life ==
José Enrique was diagnosed with chordoma, a rare brain tumour, in May 2018. On 23 June 2018, he announced that he was recovering from surgery to remove a brain tumour. He stated, "I am now in recovery and so thankful. Life is too precious." In April 2019, he received the all-clear.

== Career statistics ==
Appearances and goals by club, season and competition
Club	Season	League			National cup (Note: Includes Copa del Rey, FA Cup)		League cup (Note: Includes Football League Cup)		Europe		Total	
Club	Season	Division	Apps	Goals	Apps	Goals	Apps	Goals	Apps	Goals	Apps	Goals
Atlético Levante	2004–05	Segunda División B	19	1	—		—		—		19	1
Celta Vigo	2005–06	La Liga	14	0	3	0	—		—		17	0
Villarreal	2006–07	La Liga	23	0	2	0	—		0	0	25	0
Newcastle United	2007–08	Premier League	23	0	3	0	2	0	—		28	0
Newcastle United	2008–09	Premier League	26	0	1	0	1	0	—		28	0
Newcastle United	2009–10	Championship	34	1	2	0	1	0	—		37	1
Newcastle United	2010–11	Premier League	36	0	0	0	0	0	—		36	0
Newcastle United	Total		119	1	6	0	4	0	—		129	1
Liverpool	2011–12	Premier League	35	0	4	0	4	0	—		43	0
Liverpool	2012–13	Premier League	29	2	0	0	0	0	6 (Note: Appearances UEFA Europa League)	0	35	2
Liverpool	2013–14	Premier League	8	0	0	0	1	0	—		9	0
Liverpool	2014–15	Premier League	4	0	2	0	1	0	2 (Note: Appearances UEFA Champions League)	0	9	0
Liverpool	2015–16	Premier League	0	0	3	0	0	0	0	0	3	0
Liverpool	Total		76	2	9	0	6	0	8	0	99	2
Real Zaragoza	2016–17	Segunda División	27	1	0	0	—		—		27	1
Career total			278	5	20	0	10	0	8	0	316	5

== Honours ==
Newcastle United

- Football League Championship: 2009–10

Liverpool

- Football League Cup: 2011–12
- FA Cup runner-up: 2011–12

Individual

- PFA Team of the Year: 2009–10 Championship
- Newcastle United Player of the Year: 2009–10
