= Dani Pacheco =

Spanish footballer (born 1991)

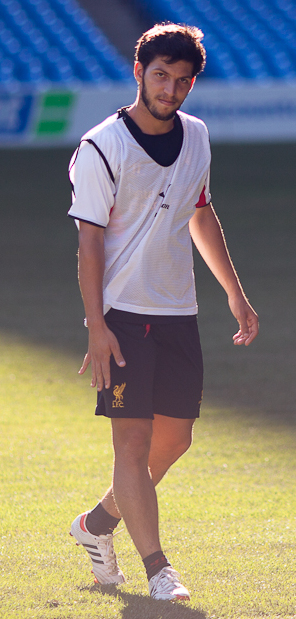
- Pacheco with Liverpool in 2012

Personal information
- Full name: Daniel Pacheco Lobato
- Date of birth: 5 January 1991 (age 35)
- Place of birth: Pizarra, Spain
- Height: 1.70 m (5 ft 7 in)
- Positions: Attacking midfielder; winger

Team information
- Current team: Wisła Płock
- Number: 8

Youth career
- Peña La Vega
- 2001–2003: Málaga
- 2003–2007: Barcelona
- 2007–2009: Liverpool

Senior career*
Years	Team	Apps	(Gls)
2009–2013	Liverpool	5	(0)
2011	→ Norwich City (loan)	6	(2)
2011–2012	→ Rayo Vallecano (loan)	11	(0)
2013	→ Huesca (loan)	19	(5)
2013–2014	Alcorcón	32	(5)
2014–2017	Betis	23	(0)
2015–2016	→ Alavés (loan)	36	(3)
2016–2017	→ Getafe (loan)	31	(3)
2017–2018	Getafe	11	(0)
2018–2020	Málaga	44	(2)
2021	Logroñés	10	(0)
2021–2022	Aris Limassol	12	(0)
2022–2024	Górnik Zabrze	62	(4)
2024–	Wisła Płock	67	(5)

International career
2007	Spain U16	5	(0)
2007–2008	Spain U17	5	(3)
2009	Spain U18	3	(1)
2009–2010	Spain U19	12	(5)
2011	Spain U20	6	(0)
2011	Spain U21	2	(0)
Medal record
Men's football
Representing Spain
UEFA Euro U-19
Runner-up	2010 France
- * Club domestic league appearances and goals as of 12:41, 11 August 2026 (UTC)

Daniel Pacheco Lobato (born 5 January 1991) is a Spanish professional footballer who plays as a winger or an attacking midfielder for Polish club Wisła Płock. He joined Liverpool in 2007 having previously been in the youth ranks at Barcelona.

== Club career ==
=== Early career ===
Pacheco signed for Liverpool from Barcelona for an undisclosed fee in the summer of 2007 and initially played for Liverpool reserves. Before his transfer, Pacheco enjoyed a reputation as a rising star in the ranks of Barcelona's youth academy. Such was his ability to score goals from almost any position, teammates nicknamed him El Asesino ("The Assassin").

Pacheco made his first start for the Liverpool reserves on 5 February 2008, against Bolton Wanderers. He scored the first goal of the game, a low curling shot past Ian Walker. In April 2008, Pacheco made a 50-yard pass to assist Krisztián Németh in scoring the only goal of the game against Blackburn Rovers Reserves, which secured the Premier Reserve League North title for Liverpool. On 7 May 2008, Pacheco, who came on as a substitute in the second half, threaded a through pass to teammate Lucas to score the third and final goal in Liverpool's Reserve League final victory over Aston Villa at Anfield.

=== Liverpool ===
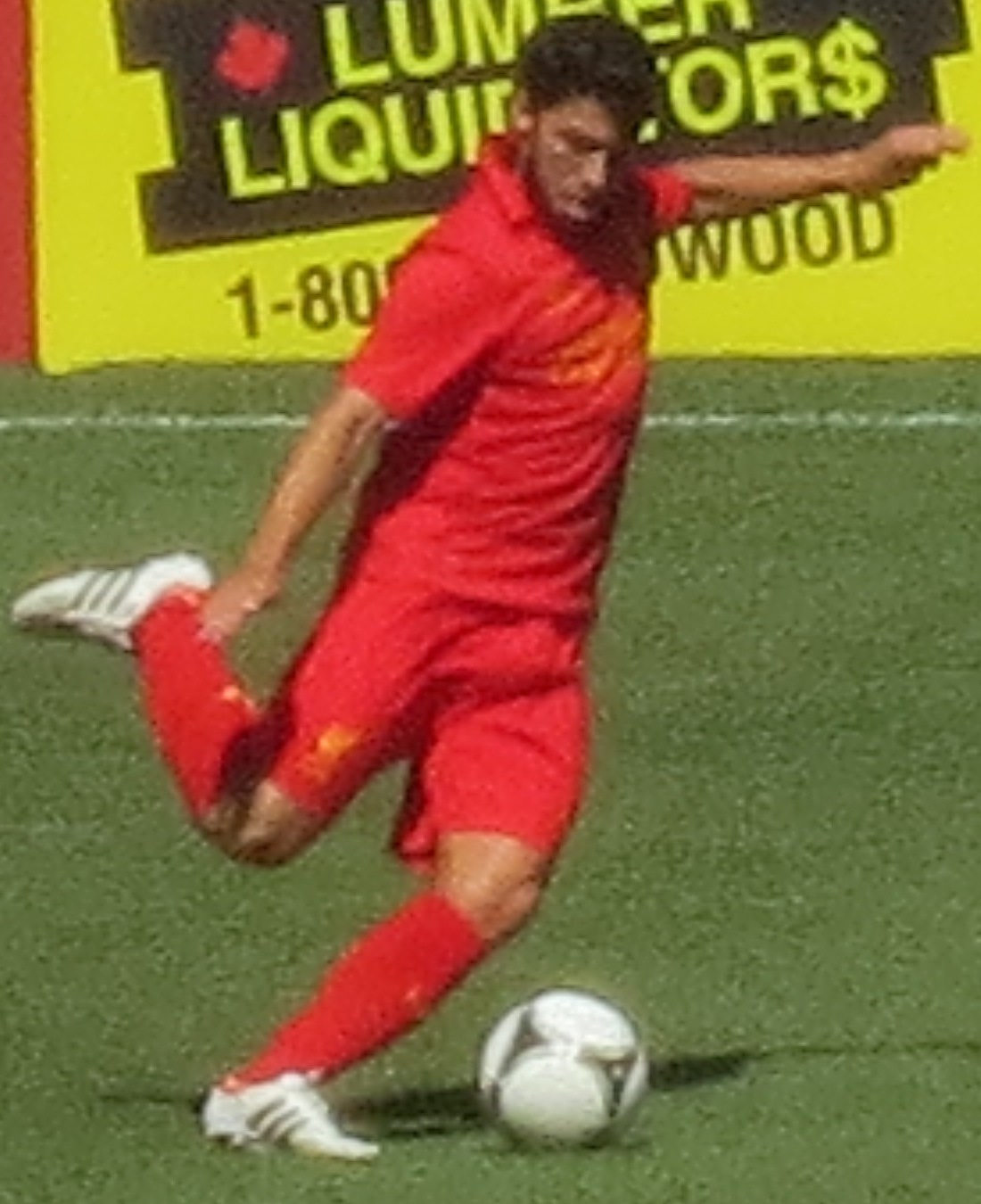
Pacheco playing for Liverpool in 2012

Pacheco made his first team debut on 9 December 2009 as a second-half substitute for Alberto Aquilani in a UEFA Champions League match against Fiorentina. His league debut came on 26 December when he replaced Aquilani once more in a 2–0 home win over Wolverhampton Wanderers.

On 18 February 2010, Pacheco came on as a substitute in the 75th minute for Aquilani again in a UEFA Europa League match versus Unirea Urziceni; six minutes later, he provided a headed assist for David Ngog's match-winning goal.

On 10 August 2010, Pacheco was handed the number 12 for the 2010–11 season, previously worn by Fábio Aurélio, who was handed number 6 after he re-signed for the club. On 3 December, Liverpool confirmed that both he and Martin Kelly had signed contract extensions until June 2014.

On 23 March 2011, Pacheco joined Norwich City on emergency loan until the end of the season, being handed the number 37 shirt. He made his debut against Scunthorpe United on 2 April, setting up the first goal for Grant Holt and playing through the pass which won the penalty for Norwich's second goal in a 6–0 rout at Carrow Road. He scored his first Norwich goal in the 5–1 away victory over East Anglia derby rivals Ipswich Town on the 21st, concluding the thrashing after coming on as a substitute for Wes Hoolahan.

On 24 August 2011, Atlético Madrid announced on their official website that Pacheco had joined the club on loan from Liverpool for the 2011–12 La Liga season, and would be immediately loaned to Rayo Vallecano for the year. It was also confirmed that Atlético had an option to buy Pacheco at the end of the season. Pacheco made his debut for Rayo Vallecano as 84th-minute substitute in the 0–1 win against Getafe on 18 September.

On 31 January 2013, Pacheco was loaned to second-tier Huesca until the end of the season. Pacheco scored on his debut for Huesca, the last goal in a 2–0 win over Real Murcia on 3 February. He helped his team with 5 goals in 19 matches.

=== Later career ===
On 2 September 2013, Pacheco joined Spanish second division team AD Alcorcón on permanent basis.

Pacheco left Alcorcón at the end of the 2013–14 season and signed for Real Betis on 11 July 2014. He appeared in 23 matches during the campaign, as his team returned to La Liga after a one-year absence.

On 28 July 2015, Pacheco was loaned to Deportivo Alavés in the second division, for one year. After again achieving top level promotion, he moved to Getafe CF on 23 July of the following year, also in a temporary deal.

Pacheco achieved a third consecutive top tier promotion with Geta, and was bought outright on 3 July 2017. On 15 August of the following year, he signed a three-year contract with Málaga CF in the second division.

Pacheco was one of the eight first team players released by Málaga on 3 October 2020, due to a layoff. The following 1 February, he signed a short-term contract with fellow second division team UD Logroñés. Pacheco was released in June 2021 following the expiration of his contract. Pacheco signed for Aris Limassol on 25 August 2021 as a free agent and was released by the club on 31 January 2022.

On 10 March 2022, he joined Polish club Górnik Zabrze until the end of the season. Pacheco left the club at the end of his contract in June 2024.

On 16 July 2024, Pacheco moved to Polish second-tier club Wisła Płock on a one-year deal, with a one-year extension option, which was exercised in April 2025. In June of that year, he helped Wisła win the I liga promotion play-offs with a 2–0 victory over Miedź Legnica, securing promotion to the 2025–26 Ekstraklasa.

== International career ==
At the 2010 UEFA European Under-19 Championship, Pacheco scored twice in Spain's group match against Portugal. He then went on to score another goal against quarter-final opponents Italy as Spain qualified for the semi-finals. He went on to score early in the semi-final against England, a game in which Spain won 3–1. They then lost the final against France 2–1, with Pacheco making an assist. He won the Golden Boot at the Championships after scoring four goals.

Pacheco made his debut for the Spain U21 team – alongside Liverpool teammate Daniel Ayala – when he featured in a friendly against France on 24 March. He played 45 minutes and received a yellow card as a second-half substitute in the 3–2 friendly defeat. He was selected as part of the Spain U20 squad to compete at the 2011 FIFA U-20 World Cup in Colombia.

== Career statistics ==
As of match played 7 August 2026

Appearances and goals by club, season and competition
Club	Season	League			National cup (Note: Includes Copa del Rey, Cypriot Cup, Polish Cup)		League cup (Note: Includes EFL Cup)		Continental		Other		Total	
Club	Season	Division	Apps	Goals	Apps	Goals	Apps	Goals	Apps	Goals	Apps	Goals	Apps	Goals
Liverpool	2009–10	Premier League	4	0	0	0	0	0	3 (Note: One appearance in UEFA Champions League, two appearances in UEFA Europa League)	0	—		7	0
Liverpool	2010–11	Premier League	1	0	0	0	1	0	5 (Note: Appearances in UEFA Europa League)	0	—		7	0
Liverpool	2012–13	Premier League	0	0	0	0	1	0	2	0	—		3	0
Liverpool	Total		5	0	0	0	2	0	10	0	0	0	17	0
Norwich City (loan)	2010–11	Championship	6	2	0	0	0	0	—		—		6	2
Rayo Vallecano (loan)	2011–12	La Liga	11	0	1	0	—		—		—		12	0
Huesca (loan)	2012–13	Segunda División	19	5	0	0	—		—		—		19	5
Alcorcón	2013–14	Segunda División	32	5	5	2	—		—		—		37	7
Real Betis	2014–15	Segunda División	23	0	2	0	—		—		—		25	0
Alavés (loan)	2015–16	Segunda División	36	3	2	0	—		—		—		38	3
Getafe	2016–17	Segunda División	31	3	0	0	—		—		3 (Note: Appearance in Segunda División promotion play-offs)	3	34	6
Getafe	2017–18	La Liga	11	0	1	0	—		—		—		12	0
Getafe	Total		42	3	1	0	0	0	0	0	3	3	46	6
Málaga	2018–19	Segunda División	22	1	0	0	—		—		2	0	24	1
Málaga	2019–20	Segunda División	22	1	0	0	—		—		—		22	1
Málaga	Total		44	2	0	0	0	0	0	0	2	0	46	2
Logroñés	2020–21	Segunda División	10	0	—		—		—		—		10	0
Aris Limassol	2021–22	Cypriot First Division	12	0	1	1	—		—		—		13	1
Górnik Zabrze	2021–22	Ekstraklasa	8	1	—		—		—		—		8	1
Górnik Zabrze	2022–23	Ekstraklasa	28	2	3	0	—		—		—		31	2
Górnik Zabrze	2023–24	Ekstraklasa	26	1	2	0	—		—		—		28	1
Górnik Zabrze	Total		62	4	5	0	0	0	0	0	0	0	67	4
Wisła Płock	2024–25	I liga	31	2	1	0	—		—		2 (Note: Appearances in I liga promotion play-offs)	1	34	3
Wisła Płock	2025–26	Ekstraklasa	31	2	1	0	—		—		—		32	2
Wisła Płock	2026–27	Ekstraklasa	3	0	0	0	—		—		—		3	0
Wisła Płock	Total		65	4	2	0	—		—		2	1	69	5
Career total			367	28	19	3	2	0	10	0	7	4	405	35

== Honours ==
Betis

- Segunda División: 2014–15

Alavés

- Segunda División: 2015–16

Spain U19

- UEFA European Under-19 Championship runner-up: 2010

Individual

- UEFA European Under-19 Championship Golden Boot: 2010
