= Jon Flanagan =

English footballer (born 1993)

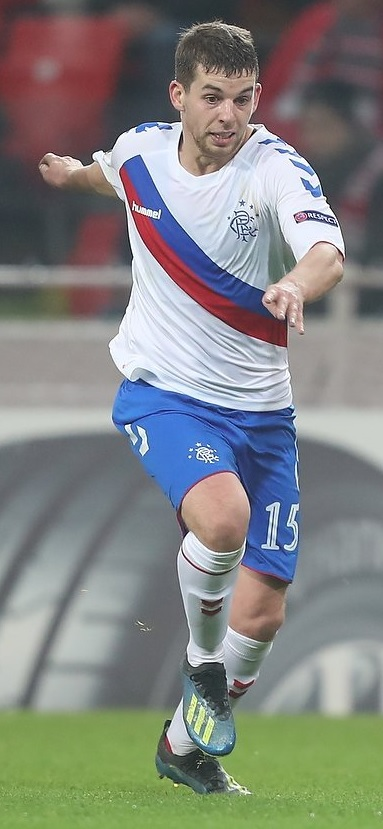
- Flanagan playing for Rangers in 2018

Personal information
- Full name: Jonathon Patrick Flanagan
- Date of birth: 1 January 1993 (age 33)
- Place of birth: Liverpool, England
- Height: 5 ft 11 in (1.81 m)
- Position: Full-back

Youth career
- –2010: Liverpool

Senior career*
Years	Team	Apps	(Gls)
2010–2018	Liverpool	40	(1)
2016–2017	→ Burnley (loan)	6	(0)
2018	→ Bolton Wanderers (loan)	9	(0)
2018–2020	Rangers	21	(0)
2020–2021	Charleroi	0	(0)
2021–2022	HB Køge	4	(0)
Total		80	(1)

International career
2011	England U19	1	(0)
2013	England U20	1	(0)
2011	England U21	3	(0)
2014	England	1	(0)
- * Club domestic league appearances and goals

Jonathon Patrick Flanagan (born 1 January 1993) is an English former professional footballer who played as a full-back. Flanagan started his career with Liverpool, and later played for Burnley, Bolton Wanderers and Rangers. He played in one full international match for the England national team, in 2014.

== Club career ==
=== Liverpool ===
==== Early career ====
While still in the U18 team, Flanagan made his reserve-team debut at Hull City in March 2010. Promoted to the reserve team at the start of the 2010–11 season, he first featured in the Lancashire Senior Cup triumph over Oldham Athletic. He was subsequently picked out as one of the reserve team to watch by The Times sport writer Tony Barrett.

==== 2010–11 season ====
Flanagan made his first team debut when he started the Premier League match against Manchester City at Anfield on 11 April 2011, being handed the number 38 shirt and playing at right-back. Liverpool went on to win the match 3–0, with the 18-year-old playing the full 90 minutes.

"The young boy is not bad. For us that is really encouraging as well because it is a reflection of the work that is being done at the academy and if we have a strong academy it can only benefit us for years to come."

— Kenny Dalglish commenting on his debut.

Flanagan continued his spell in the first team to cover for the long-term injuries of Martin Kelly and Glen Johnson, making his second start the following weekend and playing the full match in a 1–1 draw at the Emirates Stadium against Arsenal, a match in which he accidentally knocked out stand-in captain Jamie Carragher through a clash of heads. The incident did not faze the 18-year-old, however, as he gave an assured performance. In the following home match, against Birmingham City and playing alongside fellow Liverpool Academy graduate Jack Robinson, Flanagan again played the full 90 minutes and helped Liverpool to keep a clean sheet in a 5–0 win. His performance earned him a place in BBC Sport pundit Garth Crooks's Premier League team of the week.

In Flanagan's fifth start for Liverpool, he was employed as a left-back against Fulham, with Liverpool winning 5–2. His next match, against Tottenham Hotspur, resulted in him conceding a controversial penalty for minimal contact on Spurs' Steven Pienaar. Liverpool lost the match 2–0, thus falling out of a UEFA Europa League spot with one match left of the season. Flanagan was awarded young player of the 2010–11 season for his consistent contribution at right-back. He was delighted to receive this award, and said there were a number of names that helped him to progress so much. He quoted after receiving the reward, "I would first of all like to thank the gaffer, Dalglish. He believed in me, and decided I was good enough for the starting line up, and I couldn't wish for a better manager to play under." On 8 July 2011, Flanagan signed a new long-term contract with Liverpool.

==== 2011–12 season ====
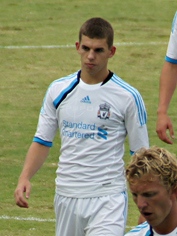
Flanagan playing for Liverpool in 2011

Flanagan played the full 90 minutes in Liverpool's opening Premier League match of the season at home to Sunderland, a 1–1 draw. Flanagan played the full 90 minutes in Liverpool's 3–1 away win against Exeter City in the League Cup, and made a late substitute appearance away to Brighton & Hove Albion in the following round of the same competition. He made his 11th Reds appearance one week after his 19th birthday, replacing Fábio Aurélio in Liverpool's 5–1 win over Oldham Athletic in the third round of the FA Cup.

He returned to the team on 24 March against Wigan Athletic in the Premier League in the absence of injured duo Glen Johnson and Martin Kelly. Flanagan retained his place, playing the full 90 minutes in Liverpool's next two league matches, before being substituted for Brad Jones in the 26th minute against Blackburn Rovers after his short back-pass had led to goalkeeper Doni being sent off. Liverpool won the match 3–2.

==== 2012–13 season ====
On 19 September, Flanagan was one of the clutch of teenagers who travelled to Switzerland to play Young Boys in a Europa League group match, but he was not named in the matchday squad due to injury. On 8 November, he made his first appearance of the season in the starting XI against Anzhi Makhachkala in the Europa League, playing the full 90 minutes in Liverpool's 1–0 loss in Moscow. Flanagan struggled through the season with injuries and was forced to miss a significant number of matches for the under-21s.

==== 2013–14 season ====
Flanagan made his first start in the Premier League in 18 months in the club's away visit to Arsenal on 2 November, after illness forced Glen Johnson out of the squad. Johnson's illness, coupled with José Enrique's injury, led to Flanagan starting in the left-back position in a reshuffled defence. Flanagan made his Merseyside derby debut, a 3–3 draw away at Everton, on 23 November in a performance that was praised by his teammate Steven Gerrard, who said that the Liverpool players gave Flanagan a round of applause when he came into the dressing room after the match. Flanagan retained his place at left-back in the next match against Hull City and was again praised for his performance, despite the match ending in a 3–1 defeat, with manager Brendan Rodgers describing his performance as "outstanding". Flanagan scored his first goal for Liverpool with a powerful half volley in a 5–0 win away at Tottenham Hotspur on 15 December.

He retained his place against Cardiff City on 21 December but was replaced early in the second half by Martin Kelly due to a tight hamstring which subsequently ruled him out of Liverpool's festive fixtures.

==== 2014–15 season ====
Flanagan did not make a single appearance for Liverpool during pre-season due to a buildup of fluid on the knee. Initially scheduled to return to first team training in early September, on 18 September Liverpool manager Brendan Rodgers confirmed that Flanagan had undergone corrective surgery on his left knee and would miss the opening months of the season. On 29 March 2015, Flanagan made his return from injury playing 30 minutes in a Liverpool All-Star charity match at Anfield. After scans highlighted a new problem, however, Flanagan underwent another knee operation in April, keeping him out for a further six-to-nine months. On 21 May 2015, Flanagan signed a 12-month contract extension with Liverpool to continue his rehabilitation.

==== 2015–18 ====
In December 2015, Flanagan returned to full training with the Liverpool first team squad. On 20 January 2016, he made his first appearance in a Liverpool matchday squad in 619 days, in a FA Cup third-round replay, coming off the bench as a 49th-minute substitute in a 3–0 victory over Exeter City. Seven days later, he started in a League Cup semi-final match against Stoke City, playing for 105 minutes. After Liverpool won on penalties, Liverpool manager Jürgen Klopp hailed Flanagan as his man of the match.

On 18 March 2016, Flanagan signed a new long-term contract through to 2019. On 20 March 2016, Flanagan captained Liverpool in a Premier League match against Southampton at St Mary's Stadium.

On 5 August 2016, Liverpool announced that Flanagan had joined fellow Premier League club Burnley on a season-long loan.

In January 2018 he joined Bolton Wanderers on loan until the end of the season. On 8 June 2018, it was announced that Flanagan would be released at the end of his contract.

=== Rangers ===
Flanagan signed a two-year contract with Scottish Premiership club Rangers, managed by his former Liverpool teammate Steven Gerrard, in June 2018. On 19 May 2020, it was announced that Flanagan would be leaving the club.

=== Charleroi ===
Flanagan signed for Belgian First Division A club Charleroi on 4 November 2020 on a contract until the end of the season with an option for an additional year.

=== HB Køge ===
Flanagan signed for Danish 1st Division club HB Køge on 15 July 2021 on a two-year contract on a free transfer. Flanagan was brought to the club by his former Liverpool-teammate, Daniel Agger, who had just been appointed manager of the club. On 24 June 2022 Køge confirmed, that they had terminated Flanagan's contract.

=== Retirement ===
Flanagan announced his retirement on 18 October 2022 at the age of 29 due to a recurring knee injury.

== International career ==
Flanagan was eligible to represent both England and the Republic of Ireland.

In May 2011, Flanagan was called up to the England under-19 squad for the first time, although he had to withdraw due to a calf injury. In August 2011, he was named in the provisional squad for England's 2013 Under-21s qualifying matches for the first time. He made his debut in the 6–0 win over Azerbaijan.

On 28 May 2013, Flanagan was named in manager Peter Taylor's 21-man squad for the 2013 FIFA U-20 World Cup. He made his debut on 16 June in a 3–0 win in a warm-up match against Uruguay. On 12 May 2014, he was named as one of seven reserves for England's 2014 FIFA World Cup squad and trained with the squad at their pre-tournament training camp in Portugal.

On 4 June 2014, Flanagan made his England senior debut, replacing Alex Oxlade-Chamberlain in the second half of a friendly against Ecuador in the United States. For the 2014 FIFA World Cup, Flanagan was announced by Roy Hodgson as one of the standby players.

== Style of play ==
Flanagan earned numerous plaudits for his style of play since his breakthrough into the Liverpool first team in November 2013; most notably, the World Cup-winning former Brazil captain and full-back Cafu heralded Flanagan as his "successor", applauding his "speed, strength and determination" and stating he "has everything required to be one of the best full-backs in the world". This led to fans dubbing Flanagan "the Scouse Cafu".

== Personal life ==
Flanagan was born in Liverpool, Merseyside. He is the nephew of former footballer Bradley Orr.

Flanagan was arrested after admitting to assaulting his girlfriend, Rachael Wall, in Liverpool City Centre on 22 December 2017. After pleading guilty, in January 2018 he was sentenced to 40 hours of unpaid work and a 12-month community order.

== Career statistics ==
=== Club ===
Appearances and goals by club, season and competition
Club	Season	League			National cup (Note: Includes FA Cup, Scottish Cup)		League cup (Note: Includes Football League/EFL Cup, Scottish League Cup)		Other		Total	
Club	Season	Division	Apps	Goals	Apps	Goals	Apps	Goals	Apps	Goals	Apps	Goals
Liverpool	2010–11	Premier League	7	0	0	0	0	0	0	0	7	0
Liverpool	2011–12	Premier League	5	0	1	0	2	0	—		8	0
Liverpool	2012–13	Premier League	0	0	1	0	0	0	1 (Note: Appearance(s) in UEFA Europa League)	0	2	0
Liverpool	2013–14	Premier League	23	1	2	0	0	0	—		25	1
Liverpool	2014–15	Premier League	0	0	0	0	0	0	0	0	0	0
Liverpool	2015–16	Premier League	5	0	2	0	1	0	0	0	8	0
Liverpool	2017–18	Premier League	0	0	0	0	1	0	0	0	1	0
Liverpool	Total		40	1	6	0	4	0	1	0	51	1
Burnley (loan)	2016–17	Premier League	6	0	3	0	1	0	="2"|—		10	0
Bolton Wanderers (loan)	2017–18	Championship	9	0	—		—		—		9	0
Rangers	2018–19	Scottish Premiership	16	0	1	0	2	0	11	0	30	0
Rangers	2019–20	Scottish Premiership	5	0	0	0	0	0	4	0	9	0
Rangers	Total		21	0	1	0	2	0	15	0	39	0
Rangers U20	2019–20	—	—		—		—		1 (Note: Appearance in Scottish Challenge Cup)	0	1	0
Charleroi	2020–21	Belgian First Division A	0	0	0	0	—		—		0	0
HB Køge	2021–22	Danish 1st Division	4	0	0	0	—		—		4	0
Career total			80	1	10	0	6	0	17	0	113	1

=== International ===
Appearances and goals by national team and year
National team	Year	Apps	Goals
England	2014	1	0
Total		1	0

== Honours ==
Liverpool

- Football League Cup runner-up: 2015–16
