= Fábio Aurélio =

Brazilian footballer (born 1979)

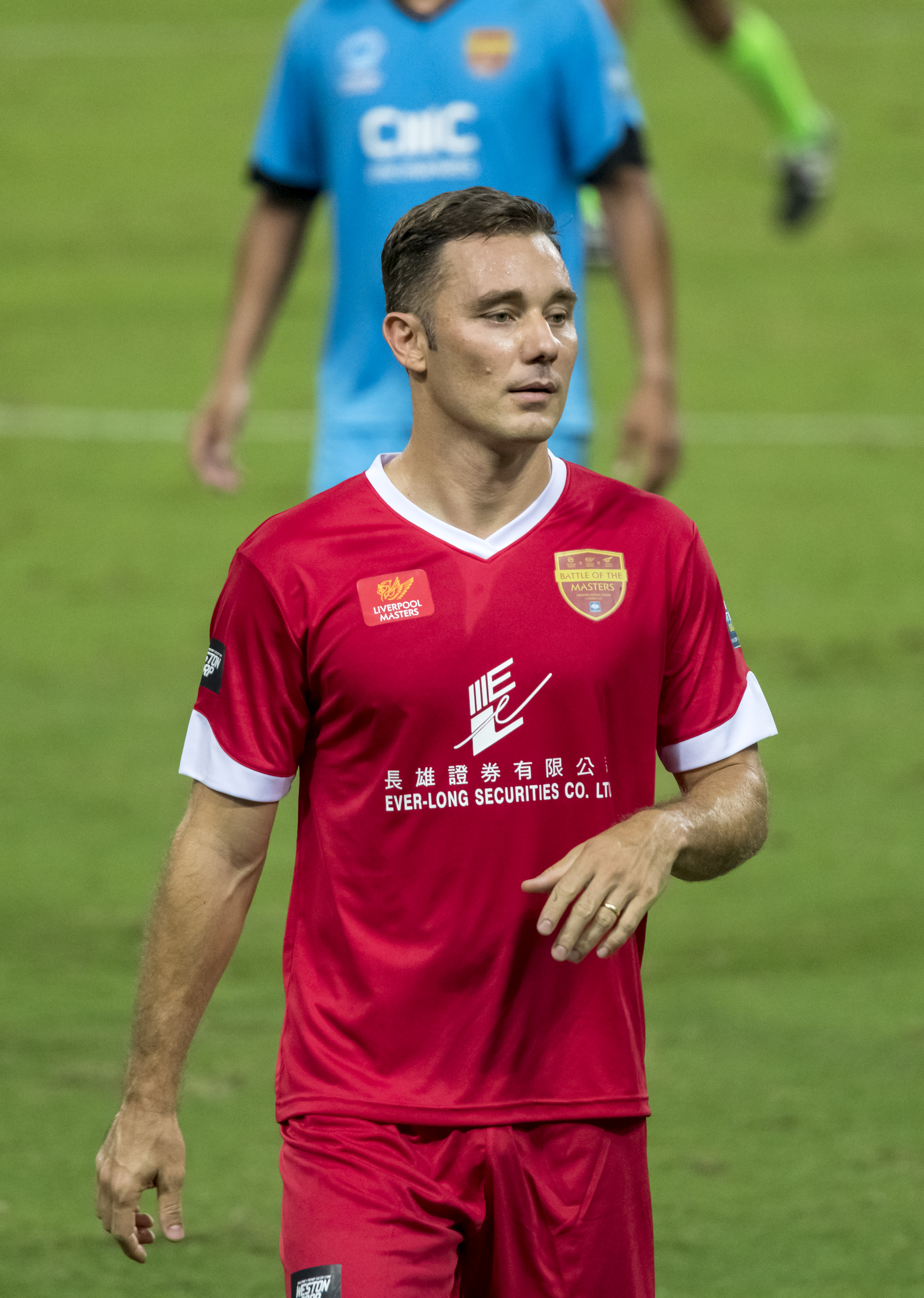
- Aurélio in 2017

Personal information
- Full name: Fábio Aurélio Rodrigues
- Date of birth: 24 September 1979 (age 47)
- Place of birth: São Carlos, Brazil
- Height: 1.78 m (5 ft 10 in)
- Positions: Left-back; left winger

Senior career*
Years	Team	Apps	(Gls)
1997–2000	São Paulo	54	(3)
2000–2006	Valencia	96	(11)
2006–2012	Liverpool	87	(3)
2012–2014	Grêmio	5	(0)
Total		242	(17)

International career
1999–2000	Brazil U-23	13	(1)
- * Club domestic league appearances and goals

Fábio Aurélio Rodrigues (born 24 September 1979) is a Brazilian former professional footballer who played for São Paulo, Valencia, Liverpool and Grěmio. He played as either a left-back or left-winger and represented Brazil at under-17 and under-20 levels and at the 2000 Sydney Olympics.

== Personal life ==
Fábio Aurélio Rodrigues was born on 24 September 1979 in São Carlos, Brazil to his parents Mario and Neide. He holds dual citizenship of both Brazil and Italy. He has one sister, who is married to fellow Brazilian footballer Edu. Aurélio is married to Elaine since January 2000, and the couple have two children, Fábio (born 2001) and Victoria (born 2006).

== Club career ==
=== São Paulo ===
Aurélio is an academy graduate of São Paulo and made his senior debut for the club in 1997, at the age of 17. During his time at the club, he made over 50 appearances and represented his native Brazil at both under-17 and under-20 levels, as well as at the 2000 Sydney Olympics. He was also part of the squads which ended as runners-up in the Campeonato Paulista in 1996 and 1997, and as champions in 1998 and 2000.

=== Valencia ===
Aurélio joined La Liga club Valencia after the 2000 Sydney Olympics on a six-year contract. The 2001–02 season would see him win his first major trophy, when he helped Rafael Benítez's side win their first La Liga championship since 1971. The following season, Aurélio established himself as one of the league's best left-backs after scoring 8 league goals (10 in all competitions). The 2003–04 season was another big year for Valencia, as they won both La Liga as well as the UEFA Cup, defeating Marseille 2–0 in the latter competition's final. Aurélio, however, missed most of the season with a broken leg, managing only two games.

=== Liverpool ===
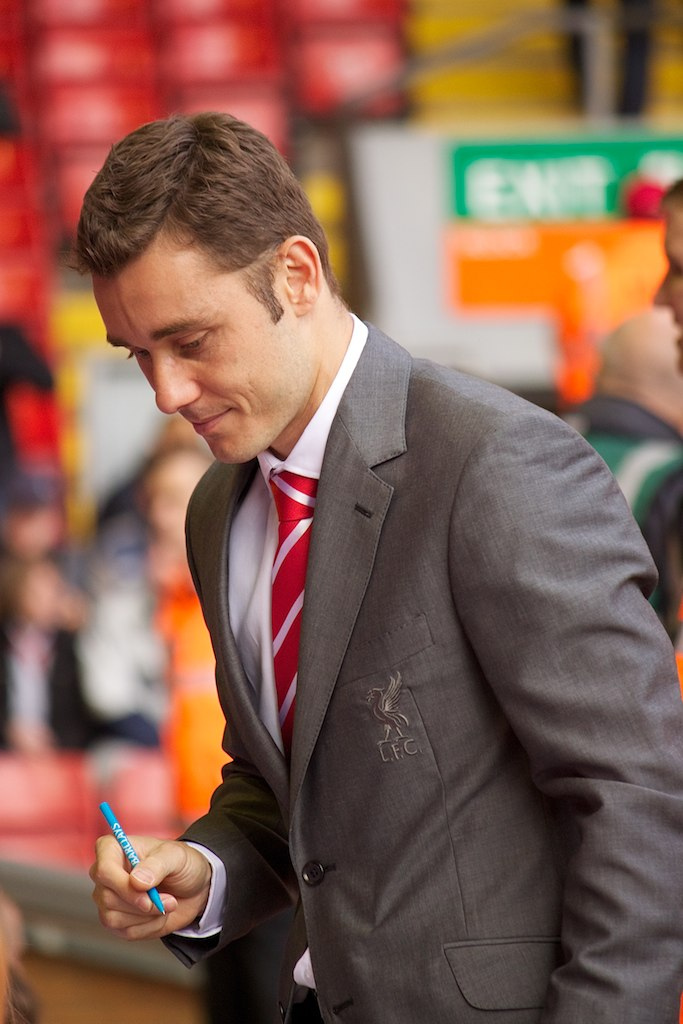
Aurélio with Liverpool in 2011

With his six-year contract having expired, Aurélio left Valencia to join Premier League club Liverpool on a Bosman free transfer in July 2006, becoming the first Brazilian to sign for the club. He cited the chance to rejoin former manager Rafael Benítez as a key factor in his decision, telling the Liverpool Echo:

"I am going to a new club in which the trainer knows me, to see if I can conquer the objectives I have set myself. The most important moments I had in my career were the titles [with Valencia] and that was with Benítez. He trusted me and he continues to trust me and that is what I value more."

On 5 July, the transfer was confirmed by Liverpool.

Aurélio made his debut for the club in the FA Community Shield victory over Chelsea on 13 August. and played a key part in the Liverpool squad during his first season, notably providing two assists for Peter Crouch and Daniel Agger in a 4–1 win over Arsenal on 31 March 2007. Aurélio, however, soon suffered a setback as he injured his achilles tendon on 3 April in a UEFA Champions League first-leg match against PSV Eindhoven. He ruled out for the rest of the 2006–07 season, meaning that he made 25 appearances in his first season on Merseyside. He returned to action the following season on 18 September, coming on as a late substitute for new signing Ryan Babel, in a 1–1 draw against Porto in the UEFA Champions League group stage.

Aurélio scored his first goal for Liverpool on 2 March 2008 in a Premier League match against Bolton Wanderers at Reebok Stadium The final score ended in a 3–1 win, with Aurélio scoring Liverpool's third with a volley from a Xabi Alonso corner. Aurélio scored again on 7 February 2009 against Portsmouth at Fratton Park with a free-kick into the bottom corner, getting his club back on level terms and helping Liverpool towards a 3–2 victory. His next goal was the third from another free-kick in a 4–1 win against rivals Manchester United on 14 March 2009.

Aurélio went on to establish himself as Liverpool's first choice left-back but was again beset by injury. In the club's 1–1 draw with Chelsea in a Champions League semi-final first-leg clash, Aurélio tore his adductor muscle after a forceful impact with Joe Cole and as a result was ruled out for the rest of the season. In the summer of 2009, while returning from the injury, he was injured playing beach football with his children. He returned a month into the season.

Rafael Benítez confirmed on 25 May 2010 that Aurélio would leave Liverpool after rejecting a pay-as-you-play offer. Following a change of manager, on 1 August 2010, Aurelio re-signed for Liverpool on a two-year deal. He made his first appearance in his second spell for the club in a pre-season game against Borussia Mönchengladbach the day after re-signing, coming on as a substitute and wearing the captain's armband for the closing stages of the match. New Liverpool manager Roy Hodgson declared his delight at being able to re-sign Aurélio and, during an interview with the club's television channel, said, "I was quite surprised when I found out he was fully fit and hadn't been offered a new contract, so I think it was a bit of an obvious thing to do. I said, 'Rather than move to another Barclays Premier League club, why don't you stay with us?'" Aurélio opted to give up the number 12 shirt he wore prior to re-signing for the club back in July and chose the number 6 shirt instead because that is the one that he had worn when playing in Brazil; The number 12 shirt was passed to Dani Pacheco.

Of his first four matches in the 2010–11 season, three came in the UEFA Europa League. He then picked up an achilles injury before making his comeback as a substitute against West Ham United on 20 November 2010, in a match which Liverpool won 3–0. Aurélio played in Liverpool's FA Cup third round match that resulted in a 1–0 defeat against Manchester United at Old Trafford on 9 January 2011. This was Kenny Dalglish's first match back in charge of Liverpool. On 11 April 2011, Aurélio returned from the injury to play in Liverpool's 3–0 home win over Manchester City. On 17 April 2011, he started at left-back against Arsenal at Emirates Stadium, where he picked up a hamstring injury and was replaced by youngster Jack Robinson. Aurélio started Liverpool's last match of the 2010–11 season against Aston Villa and Liverpool's final game of the pre-season against former club Valencia at Anfield, which Liverpool won 2–0. He started his first match of the 2011–12 season with a 5–1 win against League One side Oldham Athletic in an FA Cup match. He played 70 minutes before being replaced by Jon Flanagan. He made a substitute appearance for Liverpool against Wolverhampton Wanderers.

On 12 May 2012, Liverpool manager Kenny Dalglish revealed that Aurélio's contract was coming to an end and he would be leaving Liverpool at the end of the 2011–12 season after six years at the club.

=== Grêmio ===
On 24 May 2012, having only appeared twice in the Premier League the previous season, Aurélio returned to Brazil at the request of Vanderlei Luxemburgo to sign for Grêmio on a free transfer. However, his time at the club was marred by a torn cruciate ligament injury which saw him miss eight months of football, and he made only five appearances before announcing his retirement from professional football on 4 April 2014. Following his retirement, he revealed that he had been forced out of the club by chairman Fabio Koff after Luxemborgo had been sacked. Both Koff and club director, Rui Costa denied the allegations, alleging instead that he simply could not play anymore.

== International career ==
Having previously represented them at under-17 and under-20 level, Aurélio played for the Brazil Olympic team at the Sydney Olympics in 2000.

On 6 June 2003, Aurélio was called to represent the senior Brazil squad at the 2003 FIFA Confederations Cup by head coach Carlos Alberto Parreira but had to be withdrawn due to an injury, He was replaced by Gilberto.

On 27 October 2009, Aurélio would receive another chance to represent Brazil for friendly matches against England and Oman, but was not able to make his full debut as he had to withdrawn from the squad again due to another injury.

== Honours ==
Valencia

- La Liga: 2001–02, 2003–04
- UEFA Cup: 2003–04
- UEFA Super Cup: 2004
- UEFA Champions League runner-up: 2000–01

Liverpool

- Football League Cup: 2011–12
- FA Community Shield: 2006
