= 2010–11 Liverpool F.C. season =

English football club season

Liverpool
2010–11 season
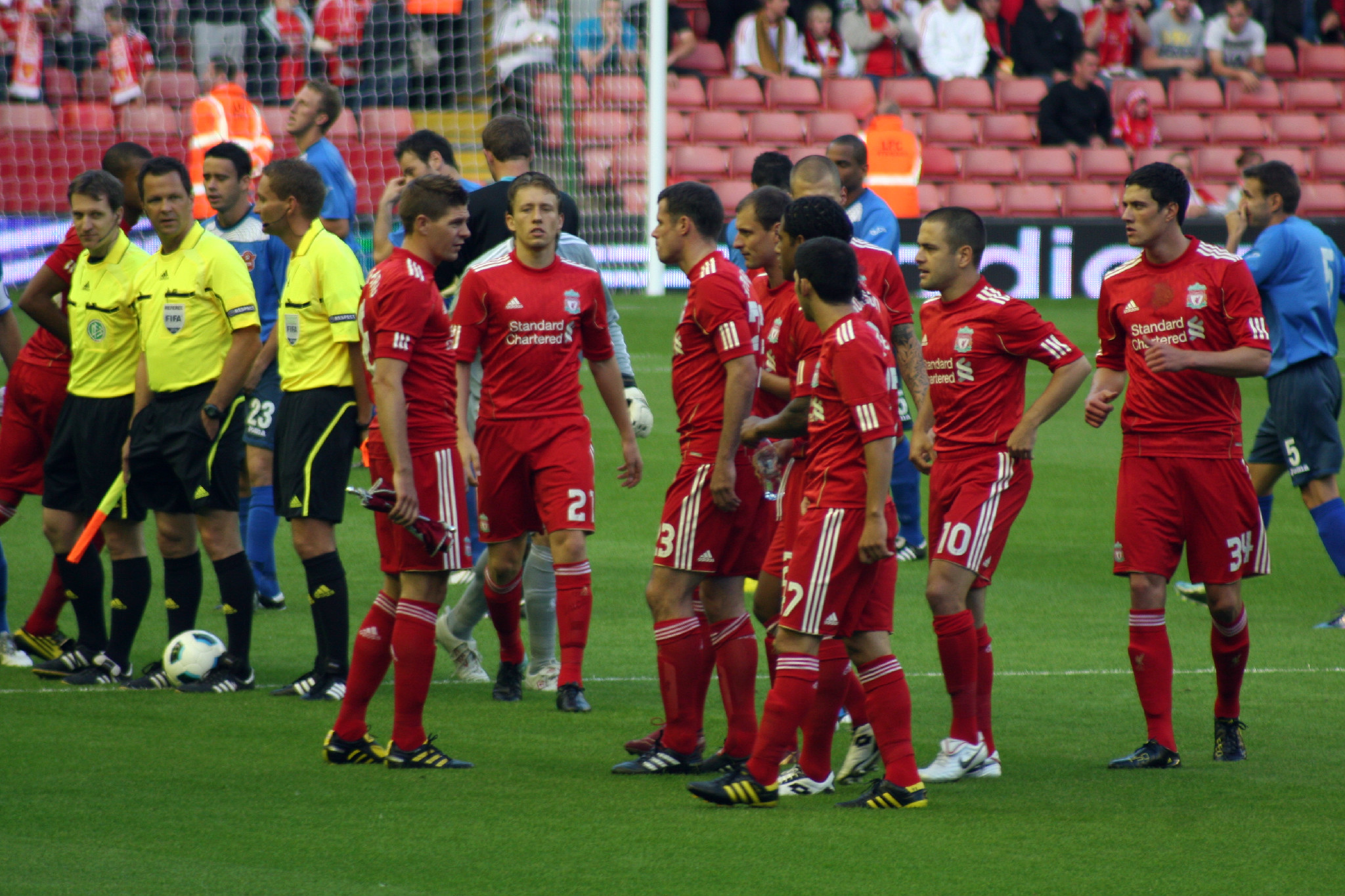
- Liverpool players practicing before a UEFA Europa League play-off match against Rabotnički
- Chairman: Martin Broughton (until 1 December); Tom Werner (from 1 December)
- Manager: Roy Hodgson (until 8 January); Kenny Dalglish (from 8 January)
- Stadium: Anfield
- Premier League: 6th
- FA Cup: Third round
- League Cup: Third round
- UEFA Europa League: Round of 16
- Top goalscorer: League: Dirk Kuyt (13); All: Dirk Kuyt (15)
- Highest home attendance: 44,975 vs Everton (16 January 2011, Premier League)
- Lowest home attendance: 35,400 vs Bolton Wanderers (1 January 2011, Premier League)
- Average home league attendance: 42,820
| Home colours | Away colours | Third colours |

The 2010–11 season was the 119th season in Liverpool Football Club's existence, and their 49th consecutive year in the top flight of English football. Pre-season saw a change of manager for Liverpool, with Rafael Benítez leaving the club by mutual consent on 3 June 2010.

On 1 July 2010, Roy Hodgson was officially announced as new manager.

On 22 September 2010, Liverpool exited the League Cup, going out at Anfield to Northampton Town of League Two on penalties after a 2–2 draw. They also exited the FA Cup losing 1–0 to Manchester United at Old Trafford in the third round. In the last competition in which they were active in, the UEFA Europa League, they were knocked out in the Round of 16 by Portuguese side Braga, losing 1–0 on aggregate.

On 8 January 2011, Liverpool announced that Hodgson had left the club by mutual consent, and Kenny Dalglish was appointed as manager until the end of the season.

Under Dalglish, the squads' fortunes improved, taking popular wins against top sides Chelsea and Manchester United, and the resurgence saw Liverpool rise up to fifth in May. Despite their resurgence Liverpool eventually finished sixth in the Premier League, having failed to qualify for the Europa League.

The season also saw Liverpool's record purchase and departure, as Fernando Torres left for Chelsea, being replaced by Newcastle United's target man Andy Carroll. Liverpool received £50 million for Torres, and paid £35 million for Carroll's services. Both transfers occurred during a busy transfer deadline day on 31 January, where Liverpool also broke its previous transfer record, paying £22.5 million for Luis Suárez, who was originally supposed to form a striking partnership with Torres.

During the season, Jon Flanagan and Jonjo Shelvey both made their top flight debuts.

== Pre-season ==
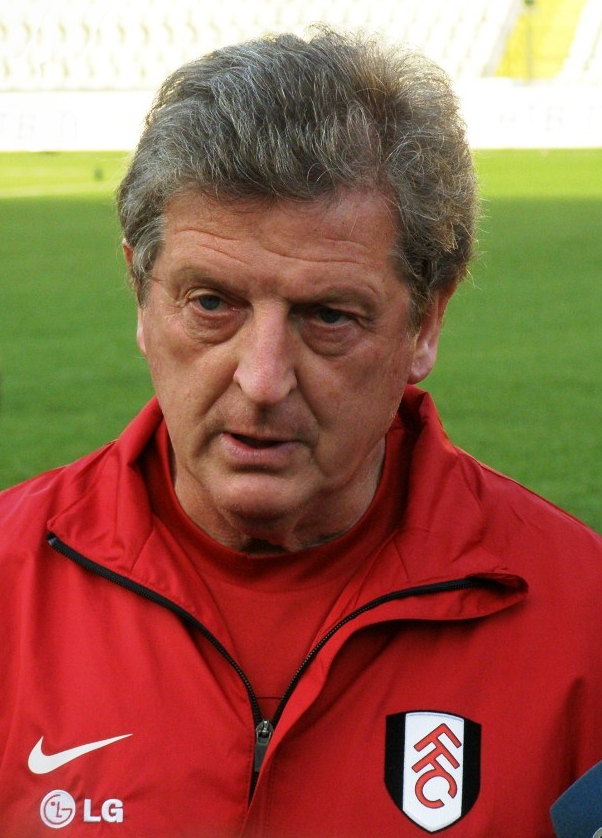
Roy Hodgson was serving as Liverpool's new manager, following the departure of his predecessor, Rafael Benítez. However, he was sacked after just 31 games in charge, due to a run of poor results.

On 1 July, Liverpool announced that their fixtures for pre-season would start in Austria against Al-Hilal on 17 July. The game, however, was cancelled due to heavy rainfall days before the match, which left the pitch in unplayable conditions. Liverpool continued with their pre-season preparations with a 0–0 draw with Grasshoppers on 21 July and a 1–0 defeat at the hands of 1. FC Kaiserslautern on 24 July thanks to a first half goal from Iliyan Mitsanski. Liverpool completed their pre-season programme with a 1–0 defeat to their 1977 European Cup Final opponents Borussia Mönchengladbach on 1 August. Karim Matmour's early goal meant that Liverpool completed their pre-season without victory.

== Season review ==
(For match reports, see matches section)

=== August ===
Liverpool started their season with a pair of wins against Macedonian side Rabotnički on 29 July. In front of a largely empty stadium, the side won their first competitive fixture under Roy Hodgson, 2–0, following a double salvo from David Ngog. In the return leg, Steven Gerrard scored from the penalty spot and Ngog scored another to make it 2–0.

On 15 August, Liverpool entertained title contenders Arsenal at Anfield. The away side had the lion's share of the possession, and looked to be well on their way to gaining control of the fixture, when Joe Cole got sent off on his Liverpool Premier League debut for a late tackle on Laurent Koscielny. In the second half, want-away star midfielder Javier Mascherano set up Ngog, who made a blistering run, before firing the ball into the back of the net. At the end of the game, the one-man deficit took its toll, and despite several spectacular saves from Pepe Reina, he eventually fumbled in an equaliser in a rare mistake from the Spanish international. Koscielny then was sent off for receiving a second yellow, before Gerrard fired a stoppage-time free kick just inches wide. Fernando Torres returned from injury and was greeted with a standing ovation while coming on.

On the Thursday that followed, Trabzonspor travelled to Anfield for the playoff round of the UEFA Europa League. A less-than-convincing first half-display from Liverpool turned into a sudden success, as Cole assisted Ryan Babel, who made no mistake with the finish. Cole then had the chance to score from the spot in the second half but blew it, the shot sent straight at the goalkeeper. Cole later admitted it was his first ever penalty kick as a professional. Christian Poulsen made his debut for the club, the Danish international being signed from Juventus for £4.5 million. At the same time, Italian playmaker Alberto Aquilani went in the other direction, in his case on loan with a public buyout clause.

On 23 August, Liverpool travelled to Eastlands to face Manchester City. Prior to the match, Mascherano handed in a transfer request and was dropped from the squad. Just days afterwards, he was presented at Barcelona. In the wake of the Mascherano saga, Liverpool struggled against Manchester City, who won 3–0, a score that could have been even higher. The goals were scored by Gareth Barry and Carlos Tevez, two former Liverpool transfer targets.

The poor season start looked to go from bad to worse as Trabzonspor scored the opener in the return leg thanks to Teófilo Gutiérrez, but thanks to a late own goal and a strike from Dirk Kuyt, Liverpool managed to just scrape through to the group stage.

On the Sunday, Liverpool capped the week off with a second win, narrowly defeating West Bromwich Albion, who surprisingly dominated the possession in the first half. Liverpool got out of jail thanks to a moment of genius from Kuyt and Torres, Kuyt playing in a nice cross which Torres rifled into the corner for the winning goal. In spite of the victory, the performance was criticised by the fans, not content with the way Hodgson set up his tactics. The response was the signing of Raul Meireles for half of the money received for Mascherano. The Portuguese international made his first foreign foray, following four Primeira Liga titles with Porto. On deadline day, Liverpool landed Paul Konchesky from Fulham.

=== September ===
In September, Liverpool struggled and recorded a winless month in Premier League matches. On 12 September, the away match against Birmingham City ended goalless, with Pepe Reina named Man of the Match following several key saves in a match where Birmingham had the upper hand. Liverpool could have won, however, as Gerrard had a penalty claim waved away in the first half.

Four days later, the side started the group stage phase of the Europa League with a comfortable victory against Steaua București at Anfield. Inside the first minute, Joe Cole took advantage of a defensive slip to score the opening goal. Despite Steaua drawing level within a quarter of an hour, Liverpool cruised to victory in the second half, with Ngog scoring twice, including his first ever penalty for the club. Lucas also scored his first of the season.

The following Sunday (19 September) was the first North West derby of the season, with Liverpool travelling to Old Trafford to face Manchester United. Two goals from Dimitar Berbatov, including a bicycle kick, saw United go into a 2–0 cushion with half an hour left, when Fernando Torres won a penalty, being pulled down by Nemanja Vidić. With Gerrard scoring from the spot, Liverpool's hopes were reinvigorated, and when Torres was pulled down outside the box, Gerrard took the free kick with great precision, drawing Liverpool level, kissing the TV camera in celebration. The Liverpool joy was short-lived, as Berbatov scored his third goal from a header less than ten minutes from time. This meant Liverpool had only five points from five games, but with two home matches against unfancied sides coming up next.

In mid-week, Liverpool lost to Northampton Town in the League Cup at Anfield. It was the first time ever Liverpool had lost to a fourth-tier team, and the team was heavily criticised by the fans following the display from what essentially was the second XI. The loss was on penalty kicks, following 1–1 at full-time and 2–2 after extra time. Following Ngog's late equaliser, Liverpool were lucky to scrape through to the shootout, where Ngog missed his penalty and the side went out in humiliating fashion.

As courtroom battles over the right to sell the club to new investors intensified, Liverpool at least got a gift against Sunderland at home, as a brief touch on the ball by a Sunderland player was deemed enough for referee Stuart Atwell to let the play go on. Torres snapped up the ball and assisted Dirk Kuyt for a controversial goal. Atwell was not awarded with any more Premier League matches for the rest of the calendar year as a result of the goal. Sunderland turned the deficit thanks to a brace from Darren Bent, one of them from the penalty spot. Liverpool was spared the embarrassment of a third consecutive defeat thanks to a header from Gerrard following Torres' second assist of the afternoon. Controversially, Gerrard and Torres celebrated the goal on separate locations, sparking further rumours of differences between the two. A few days later, Liverpool claimed a clean sheet and a point away from home against Utrecht in the Europa League.

At the end of the month, the prospect of the club going into administration was dismissed, and even if the Royal Bank of Scotland had taken over the shares, the side would not be docked the nine points as stipulated by the Premier League.

=== October ===
The crisis continued with a shock defeat to Blackpool, where Fernando Torres limped off with a groin injury in the first half. One penalty kick and a defensive mistake caused a 0–2 deficit at the interval, and in spite of Sotirios Kyrgiakos header, and a big chance for Joe Cole a minute later, the pressure faded, and Blackpool had no problems holding on. The defeat left Liverpool in the relegation zone.

The imminent takeover looked to stall, in spite of Fenway Sports Group agreeing a fee with chairman Martin Broughton, who along with Christian Purslow and Ian Ayre had a majority in Kop Holdings, the group in charge of selling the club, where co-owners Tom Hicks and George Gillett also held seats. Hicks and Gillett took the other board members to court, and on the Friday prior to the Merseyside derby, the High Court in London, declared that the process was against British law, and that the juridical process in Texas was not going to stop the affair taking place. New owner John W. Henry immediately travelled to Liverpool, watching the derby in attendance, being joined by future chairman Tom Werner.

The derby itself saw Liverpool sink deeper into the relegation mire, with Mikel Arteta and Tim Cahill scoring Everton's goals. Following the defeat, Hodgson praised the performance in the second half, which led to demands of his resignation from prominent supporter groups. Henry and FSG gave Hodgson a vote of confidence, in spite of fan demands of Kenny Dalglish to be appointed in a clean slate following the shift of ownership.

An under-pressure manager went to Naples to face Napoli, with a B-spec side. Napoli was fighting in the top of Serie A. In spite of Liverpool being tipped by fans and media alike to lose heavily, a goalless draw was eventually a fair result. Three days later, the side also turned a corner, by winning against Blackburn Rovers at Anfield. It was not quite enough to escape the relegation zone, but the performance was relatively convincing, and Torres's winner came as an immediate response to an own goal from Jamie Carragher that took Blackburn right into the match.

October ended with Hodgson's only domestic away victory with Liverpool, when the side scored a late winner at Bolton Wanderers. The match did not provide much spark until a flick with the heel from Torres put Maxi Rodríguez through five minutes from time, and the Argentine blasted the ball in with a toe-hit. In the same match, Cole got injured and was set to miss out on a whole month. The most important effect of the two-match streak was that it meant Liverpool left the relegation zone for good, albeit they were never in a safe distance from it until 15 matches later.

=== November ===
Liverpool continued their winning streak into November, with what was likely their best performance under Hodgson in a 2–0 win over Chelsea at Anfield, courtesy of two Fernando Torres who scored both goals for Liverpool. One being a well taken finish, the other a sublime piece of skill which saw him curl the ball past the helpless Petr Čech. Despite coming under serious pressure from Chelsea in the second half, Liverpool held out for a shock win. Some say that this defeat for Chelsea sparked their dreadful mid-season form which cost them the title.

However, the recovery was halted somewhat after a surprise 1–1 draw against Wigan Athletic at the DW Stadium just a few days later. Torres was again on the score sheet with a well taken opener, before Charles N'Zogbia equalised for the Latics.

There would be further frustration for the Reds on the road, after a dismal performance and a deserved 2–0 loss to Stoke City on a Saturday evening. Liverpool recovered from the defeat though, with a deserved 3–0 victory against West Ham United at Anfield thanks to three first-half goals from Glen Johnson, a penalty from Dirk Kuyt and header by Maxi Rodríguez.

Liverpool ended the month in disappointing fashion. Despite leading Tottenham Hotspur 1–0 at half time, thanks to a rare goal from Martin Škrtel, Liverpool collapsed in the second half and lost thanks to an injury time winner through Aaron Lennon.

Liverpool played only one Europa League game in this month. A 3–1 win over Napoli was not as easy as it looks on paper. Liverpool went into half time losing 1–0, but Steven Gerrard rescued his team in the second half with an excellent hat trick. A penalty, and a superb chip over the Napoli goalkeeper, as well as capitalizing on a dreadful error by former Liverpool player Andrea Dossena guided Liverpool to three points in their group.

=== December ===
Liverpool stormed to their fourth consecutive home victory, a 3–0 Monday night win against Aston Villa via first half goals from David Ngog and Ryan Babel. (This would be Babel's last goal for the club.) Maxi Rodríguez added a third in the second half after an excellent Liverpool counter-attack. Gérard Houllier claimed afterwards that he "didn't mind" losing to Liverpool, prompting a furious response from Villa fans. On another Saturday evening game, Liverpool were torn apart by Newcastle United, falling 3–1 at St James' Park. Dirk Kuyt managed to draw the Reds level after Kevin Nolan had fired Newcastle in front, but Joey Barton put the Geordies in front.

Liverpool played only three games in December after the scheduled game at Bloomfield Road against Blackpool was canceled. Liverpool ended the month with the visit of Wolverhampton Wanderers to Anfield, although Liverpool had lost their last game, fans were reasonably confident of a good result in this game. Raul Meireles should have put Liverpool in front after nine minutes when presented with a one-on-one opportunity after a quick free kick from Fernando Torres, as this proved to be Liverpool's best chance of the night. Wolves gradually grew into the game and restricted Liverpool to long, and hopeful hoofs from Pepe Reina to give them a chance. Stephen Ward deservedly put Wolves in front after an hour and Liverpool fans visibly became more distressed. Chants of "Dalglish" grew louder, and ironic chants of "Hodgson for England" (in reference to Roy being linked with the position after England's disastrous 2010 FIFA World Cup campaign) were echoing round the stadium. Some home fans even joined in the away supports chants of "You're getting sacked in the morning" and booed when David Ngog was substituted for Ryan Babel, despite the Frenchman being Liverpool's best player on the night. As well as cheering ironically when Paul Konchesky was substituted for Fábio Aurélio, the fans booed at the final whistle and the contempt for Hodgson was stronger than ever.

Liverpool drew both of their December Europa League games, a 1–1 away draw against Steaua and a 0–0 draw against Utrecht at Anfield, enough for Liverpool's progression to the competition's knockout stages.

=== January ===
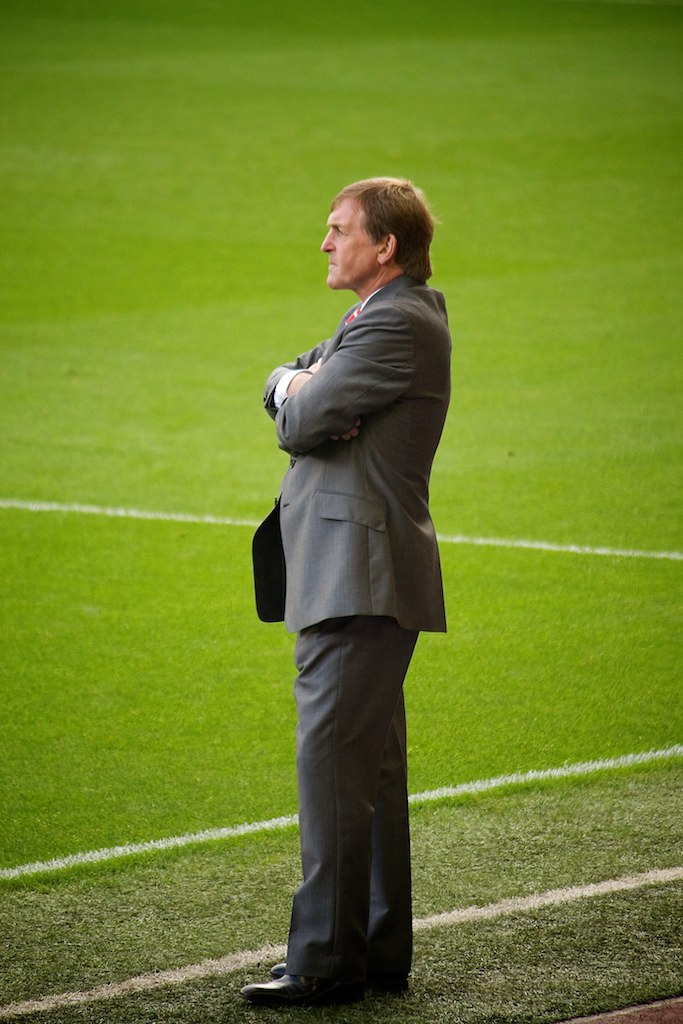
Kenny Dalglish temporarily served as the caretaker manager of Liverpool in 2011, following the sacking of Roy Hodgson. He was eventually promoted to full-time manager.

January began in dramatic fashion for Liverpool. On the traditional New Year's Day fixture, they fell behind at home to Bolton in the 43rd minute thanks to a Kevin Davies goal. An unsurprisingly, nowhere near full Anfield, rallied and got their rewards through a 49th-minute goal by Fernando Torres. Liverpool secured a league double over Bolton, and again scored late against them, with Joe Cole getting on the score sheet for the first time in his Liverpool career in the Premier League. This would be Hodgson's last game at Anfield.

In what would prove to be Hodgson's last ever game as Liverpool manager, his team were torn to shreds by a stunning performance from Blackburn. First half goals from Martin Olsson and a goal for Benjani set the tone for the rest of the evening. Things went from bad to worse for Liverpool after Benjani scored his second goal to make the score 3–0 after just 58 minutes. Liverpool were clearly shell shocked, but did manage to pull a goal back through Gerrard. Liverpool also got a penalty with only a few minutes to go, but Gerrard uncharacteristically skied the ball over the bar. Gerrard appeared to show little emotion after missing the penalty that would have got Liverpool back into the game, sparking rumours that he missed the spot kick on purpose to get Hodgson sacked.

On 8 January 2011, just one day before Liverpool were due to kick off their FA Cup campaign against Manchester United, the club announced Hodgson had left by mutual consent. Kenny Dalglish was due to take charge on a temporary basis until the end of the season. The news was welcomed by most Liverpool fans and the FA Cup game somewhat took lesser importance given Dalglish had not even had a days training with the squad he had inherited.

Liverpool lost their third round FA Cup game to Manchester United at Old Trafford thanks to an early penalty from Ryan Giggs; the spot kick was awarded after Dimitar Berbatov had gone over from a Daniel Agger challenge. Gerrard was to be sent off by referee Howard Webb in the first half after a reckless challenge, which would mean he would miss Liverpool's next three games (including the derby game against Everton at Anfield).

In Dalglish's first ever Premier League game in charge of Liverpool, his side lost to Blackpool 2–1, despite first taking the lead. Meireles finally scored his first goal for the club in the match, which ended 2–2. Anfield, however, was stunned after a Sylvain Distin goal from a corner in the first minute of the second half. Jermaine Beckford then put Everton in front with a well-placed finish. Liverpool won a penalty in the 68th minute which Dirk Kuyt duly slotted home. Despite the result, it was a definite improvement to performances under Hodgson.

In Liverpool's second league away game under Dalglish, they stormed past Wolves. Winning by a 3–0 margin, soon-to-depart Fernando Torres scored his last goals for the club. The first was from an excellent breakaway move which saw Meireles slip in the Spaniard who had an easy task to convert. It was Meireles who added a second on the day with a stunning volley that was later voted Goal of the Season by Liverpool fans. Torres rounded off the day – and his Liverpool career – by finishing a 31-pass move to give Dalglish his first win in charge of Liverpool. A few days later, Torres and Meireles helped out stressing John Paintsil into botching a clearance that resulted in Liverpool winning 1–0 at home to Fulham, this in spite of being struggling throughout the game. This meant the side moved into the top half of the table. On 31 January came Dalglish's first signings for the club since taking charge for the second time; Luis Suárez and Andy Carroll joined Liverpool for £22 million and a club record £35 million respectively. Torres left Liverpool for Chelsea for £50 million the same day, following a transfer request and a couple of intense days for the club as they had a bid turned down for Carroll before they sealed the transfer. Torres's move was regarded with contempt by Liverpool supporters, some of whom burned their replica "Torres #9" shirts on live television (Sky Sports News).

=== February ===
Following the sale of Torres and the arrivals of Carroll and Suárez (none fit enough to start from the beginning), Liverpool seemed to have a much thinner squad than at the start of the season. Carroll was unavailable for another month, while Suárez had been suspended due to biting Otman Bakkal in the ear in Eredivisie and therefore lacked match fitness. In the home game against Stoke, it was therefore primarily left to Gerrard and Meireles to earn the victory. Gerrard's free kick hit the wall and bounced favourably for Meireles, who tucked in a close-range shot to ensure Liverpool took the lead. Suárez was then substituted onto the pitch, and from a Dirk Kuyt throughball was alone with the goalkeeper, rounded him and tried to place a shot into the corner. A Stoke defender tried to clear in vain, and Suárez therefore became the first Liverpool player since his predecessor Torres to score on his Anfield debut.

The coming weekend Liverpool travelled to London to face Chelsea, with Torres making his debut against his former club. He received an elbow check from Daniel Agger and was denied a shot at goal when Jamie Carragher threw himself in his path. Being largely invisible in the second half, he was substituted, only to see Meireles tuck away one of only two chances for Liverpool the entire match, which won the game for the side. In the first half, Maxi Rodríguez had missed an open goal, whereas Chelsea struggled to create any significant chances at all on Liverpool's compact five-men defensive line, in which Glen Johnson had been moved to left back due to Fábio Aurélio's injury. Right back Martin Kelly impressed in his role.

Late February saw three unsuccessful clashes for Liverpool as the resurgence was halted. Following Meireles' goal against Wigan at Anfield and a compact advantage in play, few had expected defender Steve Gohouri to equalise for Wigan, after Liverpool's performance decreased in the second half. Suárez came close to a dream full debut as he smashed a free kick against the bar. Next Thursday, Liverpool travelled to the Czech Republic to face Sparta Prague. A dull encounter ended 0–0 with barely any chances created. The slump continued as relegation-bound West Ham beat Liverpool 3–1 at Upton Park on 28 February. This included a spectacular and rare strike from Hammer's figurehead Scott Parker, while Demba Ba and Carlton Cole also found the net against a five-defender line that looked out of place the entire game. Suárez was again on the prowl for Liverpool as he assisted Glen Johnson for the late consolation goal.

With Suárez being cup-tied for the Europa League, Liverpool had to make do without him in the return leg against Sparta Prague at Anfield. The visitors came close to having a shock away goal to knock Liverpool out, before Dirk Kuyt reacted the fastest on a late corner to head Liverpool into the last 16.

=== March ===
Liverpool were defeated by Braga in Portugal after Sotirios Kyrgiakos made a clumsy challenge that resulted in a spot-kick which Alan converted. Manchester United then came to Liverpool in search of three points to effectively put themselves out of bounds in the title chase against Arsenal. Liverpool donned a 4–3–3 formation with Kuyt and Suárez interchanging positions between right and centre and Maxi Rodríguez to the left. The trio's mobility put large holes to display in United's defence, with a stunning solo raid from Suárez enabling Kuyt to nick an open goal on about 20 minutes time. Following Dimitar Berbatov's hitting of the post for United in the opening ten minutes, that turned the play up on its head, and when Nani tried to clear a Suárez cross, only to hit the path of Kuyt, Liverpool went 2–0 up. In the second half, Suárez fired a free kick that Edwin van der Sar was powerless to keep in his hands, and Kuyt pounced on the rebound to make it a hat-trick and sealing the win for Liverpool. The game also saw a horrific challenge from Jamie Carragher on Nani, resulting in the latter being carried of the pitch on a stretcher with Carragher surprisingly escaping a red card for the late challenge. A challenge from Fabio on a Liverpool player a minute later in response nearly started a brawl on-pitch. As it was, the second half was a much less heated affair, and even though Javier Hernández scored a late consolation goal for United, Liverpool's win was never in doubt.

The return leg against Braga saw Andy Carroll get a big chance to equalise on aggregate, but his header hit the bar and Liverpool went out in the last 16. This was the first time since 2006 that Liverpool fans had no European quarter-final to look forward too, and the elimination was considered a disappointment.

With Suárez back in the starting XI away from home to Sunderland, the side won 2–0. Gerrard was out for the season with a hamstring injury, which saw Jay Spearing receiving long-awaited first team action. Spearing was brought down on the edge of the box and the referee decided it was committed inside the area. Kuyt converted the spot kick to send Liverpool ahead, and Suárez clinched the victory with a hard shot from a tight angle that goalkeeper Simon Mignolet could not save.

== Players ==
=== First Team ===
Players' age as of 31 May 2011 (end of season)

| No. | Name | Nationality | Position | Date of birth (age) | Signed from | Contract ends |
Goalkeepers
| 25 | Pepe Reina | (Spain) | GK | 31 August 1982 (aged 28) | Villarreal | 2016 |
| 42 | Péter Gulácsi | (Hungary) | GK | 6 March 1990 (aged 21) | MTK Hungária | 2013 |
Defenders
| 2 | Glen Johnson | (England) | RB | 23 August 1984 (aged 26) | Portsmouth | 2015 |
| 3 | Paul Konchesky | (England) | LB | 15 May 1981 (aged 30) | Fulham | 2014 |
| 5 | Daniel Agger | (Denmark) | CB | 12 December 1984 (aged 26) | Brøndby | 2014 |
| 6 | Fábio Aurélio | (Brazil) | LB | 24 September 1979 (aged 31) | Valencia | 2012 |
| 16 | Sotirios Kyrgiakos | (Greece) | CB | 23 July 1979 (aged 31) | AEK Athens | 2011 |
| 22 | Danny Wilson | (Scotland) | CB | 27 December 1991 (aged 19) | Rangers | 2013 |
| 23 | Jamie Carragher | (England) | CB | 28 January 1978 (aged 33) | The Academy | 2013 |
| 34 | Martin Kelly | (England) | RB | 27 April 1990 (aged 21) | The Academy | 2014 |
| 37 | Martin Škrtel | (Slovakia) | CB | 15 December 1984 (aged 26) | Zenit | 2014 |
| 38 | Jon Flanagan | (England) | RB | 1 January 1993 (aged 18) | The Academy | 2013 |
| 49 | Jack Robinson | (England) | LB | 1 September 1993 (aged 17) | The Academy | 2013 |
Midfielders
| 4 | Raul Meireles | (Portugal) | CM | 17 March 1983 (aged 28) | Porto | 2014 |
| 8 | Steven Gerrard | (England) | DM/CM/AM | 30 May 1980 (aged 31) | The Academy | 2013 |
| 10 | Joe Cole | (England) | AM | 8 November 1981 (aged 29) | Chelsea | 2014 |
| 17 | Maxi Rodríguez | (Argentina) | LW | 2 January 1981 (aged 30) | Atlético Madrid | 2013 |
| 18 | Dirk Kuyt | (Netherlands) | RW | 22 July 1980 (aged 30) | Feyenoord | 2013 |
| 21 | Lucas | (Brazil) | DM | 9 January 1987 (aged 24) | Grêmio | 2015 |
| 26 | Jay Spearing | (England) | DM | 25 November 1988 (aged 22) | The Academy | 2015 |
| 28 | Christian Poulsen | (Denmark) | DM | 28 February 1980 (aged 31) | Juventus | 2013 |
| 33 | Jonjo Shelvey | (England) | CM | 27 February 1992 (aged 19) | Charlton Athletic | 2014 |
Strikers
| 7 | Luis Suárez | (Uruguay) | ST | 24 January 1987 (aged 24) | Ajax | 2016 |
| 9 (Note: Carroll could not wear number 9 in the UEFA Europa League as Fernando Torres previously wore the number in the competition. He instead wore the number 29.) | Andy Carroll | (England) | ST | 6 January 1989 (aged 22) | Newcastle United | 2016 |
| 14 | Milan Jovanović | (Serbia) | ST | 18 April 1981 (aged 30) | Standard Liège | 2013 |
| 24 | David Ngog | (France) | ST | 1 April 1989 (aged 22) | Paris Saint-Germain | 2012 |

== Squad statistics ==
=== Appearances and goals ===
As of 22 May 2011.

| No. | Pos | Nat | Player | Total | | Premier League | | UEFA Europa League | | FA Cup | | League Cup | |
| No. | Pos | Nat | Player | Apps | Goals | Apps | Goals | Apps | Goals | Apps | Goals | Apps | Goals |
|---|---|---|---|---|---|---|---|---|---|---|---|---|---|
| 2 | DF | (England) ENG | Glen Johnson | 35 | 2 | 28 | 2 | 7 | 0 | 0 | 0 | 0 | 0 |
| 3 | DF | (England) ENG | Paul Konchesky | 18 | 0 | 15 | 0 | 3 | 0 | 0 | 0 | 0 | 0 |
| 4 | MF | (Portugal) POR | Raul Meireles | 41 | 5 | 32+1 | 5 | 7 | 0 | 1 | 0 | 0 | 0 |
| 5 | DF | (Denmark) DEN | Daniel Agger | 21 | 0 | 12+4 | 0 | 3 | 0 | 1 | 0 | 1 | 0 |
| 6 | DF | (Brazil) BRA | Fábio Aurélio | 21 | 0 | 7+7 | 0 | 5+1 | 0 | 1 | 0 | 0 | 0 |
| 7 | FW | (Uruguay) URU | Luis Suárez | 13 | 4 | 12+1 | 4 | 0 | 0 | 0 | 0 | 0 | 0 |
| 8 | MF | (England) ENG | Steven Gerrard | 24 | 8 | 20+1 | 4 | 1+1 | 4 | 1 | 0 | 0 | 0 |
| 9 | FW | (England) ENG | Andy Carroll | 9 | 2 | 5+2 | 2 | 1+1 | 0 | 0 | 0 | 0 | 0 |
| 10 | MF | (England) ENG | Joe Cole | 32 | 3 | 9+11 | 2 | 10+2 | 1 | 0 | 0 | 0 | 0 |
| 14 | MF | (Serbia) SRB | Milan Jovanović | 18 | 2 | 5+5 | 0 | 7 | 1 | 0 | 0 | 1 | 1 |
| 16 | DF | (Greece) GRE | Sotirios Kyrgiakos | 28 | 2 | 10+6 | 2 | 9+2 | 0 | 0 | 0 | 1 | 0 |
| 17 | MF | (Argentina) ARG | Maxi Rodríguez | 35 | 10 | 24+4 | 10 | 4+2 | 0 | 1 | 0 | 0 | 0 |
| 18 | FW | (Netherlands) NED | Dirk Kuyt | 41 | 15 | 32+1 | 13 | 6+1 | 2 | 1 | 0 | 0 | 0 |
| 21 | MF | (Brazil) BRA | Lucas | 47 | 1 | 32+1 | 0 | 9+3 | 1 | 1 | 0 | 1 | 0 |
| 22 | DF | (Scotland) SCO | Danny Wilson | 8 | 0 | 1+1 | 0 | 5 | 0 | 0 | 0 | 1 | 0 |
| 23 | DF | (England) ENG | Jamie Carragher | 38 | 0 | 28 | 0 | 9+1 | 0 | 0 | 0 | 0 | 0 |
| 24 | FW | (France) FRA | David Ngog | 38 | 8 | 9+16 | 2 | 8+3 | 5 | 0+1 | 0 | 1 | 1 |
| 25 | GK | (Spain) ESP | Pepe Reina | 50 | 0 | 38 | 0 | 11 | 0 | 1 | 0 | 0 | 0 |
| 26 | MF | (England) ENG | Jay Spearing | 20 | 0 | 10+1 | 0 | 5+3 | 0 | 0 | 0 | 1 | 0 |
| 28 | MF | (Denmark) DEN | Christian Poulsen | 21 | 0 | 9+3 | 0 | 9 | 0 | 0 | 0 | 0 | 0 |
| 33 | MF | (England) ENG | Jonjo Shelvey | 21 | 0 | 0+15 | 0 | 4 | 0 | 0+1 | 0 | 0+1 | 0 |
| 34 | DF | (England) ENG | Martin Kelly | 23 | 0 | 10+1 | 0 | 10 | 0 | 1 | 0 | 1 | 0 |
| 37 | DF | (Slovakia) SVK | Martin Škrtel | 49 | 2 | 38 | 2 | 7+3 | 0 | 1 | 0 | 0 | 0 |
| 38 | DF | (England) ENG | Jon Flanagan | 7 | 0 | 7 | 0 | 0 | 0 | 0 | 0 | 0 | 0 |
| 45 | FW | (England) ENG | Tom Ince | 1 | 0 | 0 | 0 | 0 | 0 | 0 | 0 | 0+1 | 0 |
| 49 | DF | (England) ENG | Jack Robinson | 2 | 0 | 1+1 | 0 | 0 | 0 | 0 | 0 | 0 | 0 |
Players sold or loaned out after the start of the season:
| 1 | GK | (Brazil) BRA | Diego Cavalieri | 2 | 0 | 0 | 0 | 2 | 0 | 0 | 0 | 0 | 0 |
| 1 | GK | (Australia) AUS | Brad Jones | 2 | 0 | 0 | 0 | 1 | 0 | 0 | 0 | 1 | 0 |
| 4 | MF | (Italy) ITA | Alberto Aquilani | 2 | 0 | 0 | 0 | 1+1 | 0 | 0 | 0 | 0 | 0 |
| 9 | FW | (Spain) ESP | Fernando Torres | 26 | 9 | 22+1 | 9 | 2 | 0 | 1 | 0 | 0 | 0 |
| 12 | FW | (Spain) ESP | Dani Pacheco | 7 | 0 | 0+1 | 0 | 2+3 | 0 | 0 | 0 | 1 | 0 |
| 19 | FW | (Netherlands) NED | Ryan Babel | 17 | 2 | 1+8 | 1 | 6 | 1 | 0+1 | 0 | 1 | 0 |
| 20 | MF | (Argentina) ARG | Javier Mascherano | 1 | 0 | 1 | 0 | 0 | 0 | 0 | 0 | 0 | 0 |
| 32 | DF | (England) ENG | Stephen Darby | 1 | 0 | 0 | 0 | 0+1 | 0 | 0 | 0 | 0 | 0 |
| 38 | FW | (Finland) FIN | Lauri Dalla Valle | 1 | 0 | 0 | 0 | 0+1 | 0 | 0 | 0 | 0 | 0 |
| 39 | FW | (England) ENG | Nathan Eccleston | 7 | 0 | 0+1 | 0 | 1+4 | 0 | 0 | 0 | 0+1 | 0 |
| 46 | FW | (England) ENG | David Amoo | 1 | 0 | 0 | 0 | 1 | 0 | 0 | 0 | 0 | 0 |

=== Top scorers ===
Includes all competitive matches. The list is sorted by shirt number when total goals are equal.

Last updated on 9 May 2011

| Position | Nation | Number | Name | Premier League | Europa League | League Cup | FA Cup | Total |
|---|---|---|---|---|---|---|---|---|
| 1 | (Netherlands) | 18 | Dirk Kuyt | 13 | 2 | 0 | 0 | 15 |
| 2 | (Argentina) | 17 | Maxi Rodríguez | 10 | 0 | 0 | 0 | 10 |
| 3 | (Spain) | 9 | Fernando Torres | 9 | 0 | 0 | 0 | 9 |
| 4 | (England) | 8 | Steven Gerrard | 4 | 4 | 0 | 0 | 8 |
| 4 | (France) | 24 | David Ngog | 2 | 5 | 1 | 0 | 8 |
| 6 | (Portugal) | 4 | Raul Meireles | 5 | 0 | 0 | 0 | 5 |
| 7 | (Uruguay) | 7 | Luis Suárez | 4 | 0 | 0 | 0 | 4 |
| 8 | (England) | 10 | Joe Cole | 2 | 1 | 0 | 0 | 3 |
| 9 | (England) | 2 | Glen Johnson | 2 | 0 | 0 | 0 | 2 |
| 9 | (England) | 9 | Andy Carroll | 2 | 0 | 0 | 0 | 2 |
| 9 | (Serbia) | 14 | Milan Jovanović | 0 | 1 | 1 | 0 | 2 |
| 9 | (Greece) | 16 | Sotirios Kyrgiakos | 2 | 0 | 0 | 0 | 2 |
| 9 | (Netherlands) | 19 | Ryan Babel | 1 | 1 | 0 | 0 | 2 |
| 9 | (Slovakia) | 37 | Martin Škrtel | 2 | 0 | 0 | 0 | 2 |
| 15 | (Brazil) | 21 | Lucas | 0 | 1 | 0 | 0 | 1 |
| TOTALS | | | | 58 | 15 | 2 | 0 | 75 |

== Disciplinary record ==
Updated 08/05/11

| N | Pos. | Nat. | Name | Yellow card | Second yellow card | Red card | Notes |
|---|---|---|---|---|---|---|---|
| 21 | CM | (Brazil) | Lucas | 9 | 1 | 0 | |
| 8 | CM | (England) | Gerrard | 2 | | 1 | |
| 10 | AM | (England) | Cole | 1 | | 1 | |
| 37 | CB | (Slovakia) | Škrtel | 9 | | | |
| 4 | CM | (Portugal) | Meireles | 6 | | | |
| 9 | CF | (Spain) | Torres | 6 | | | |
| 23 | CB | (England) | Carragher | 5 | | | |
| 2 | DF | (England) | Johnson | 5 | | | |
| 25 | GK | (Spain) | Reina | 4 | | | |
| 17 | RW | (Argentina) | Rodríguez | 3 | | | |
| 18 | FW | (Netherlands) | Kuyt | 3 | | | |
| 28 | DM | (Denmark) | Poulsen | 3 | | | |
| 34 | CB | (England) | Kelly | 3 | | | |
| 16 | CB | (Greece) | Kyrgiakos | 2 | | | |
| 3 | DF | (England) | Konchesky | 2 | | | |
| 24 | CF | (France) | Ngog | 2 | | | |
| 6 | LB | (Brazil) | Aurélio | 2 | | | |
| 9 | FW | (England) | Carroll | 2 | | | |
| 38 | RB | (England) | Flanagan | 2 | | | |
| 7 | FW | (Uruguay) | Suárez | 1 | | | |
| 22 | CB | (Scotland) | Wilson | 1 | | | |
| 33 | CM | (England) | Shelvey | 1 | | | |
| 49 | LB | (England) | Robinson | 1 | | | |
| 14 | LW | (Serbia) | Jovanović | 1 | | | |
| 39 | FW | (England) | Eccleston | 1 | | | |

Last updated: 30 October 2010
Source: https://news.bbc.co.uk/sport2/hi/football/teams/l/liverpool/squad_profiles/default.stm
Only competitive matches
(yellow card) = Number of bookings; (second yellow card) = Number of sending offs after a second yellow card; (red card) = Number of sending offs by a direct red card.. |} Last updated: 27 January 2011
Source: Squad stats and Start formations.
Only competitive matches.
Using the most used start formation.
Ordered by position on pitch (from back right to front left).

== Team kit ==
The home strip for the 2010–11 season was revealed on 8 April 2010 bearing the Standard Chartered logo. The Adidas strip represents a modern interpretation of the one worn during the 1989–90 campaign in which Liverpool won their eighteenth league title. The away strip was revealed on 8 June and is white with a red trim, with black shorts accompanying it. The third kit was revealed on 15 June and is black with a yellow trim.

== Transfers ==
=== In ===
First Team

| No. | Pos. | Nat. | Name | Age | EU | Moving from | Type | Transfer window | Ends | Transfer fee | Source |
|---|---|---|---|---|---|---|---|---|---|---|---|
| 33 | CM | (England) | Jonjo Shelvey | 18 | EU | Charlton Athletic | Transfer | Summer | 2014 | £1,700,000 | liverpoolfc.com |
| 14 | FW | (Serbia) | Milan Jovanović | 29 | Non-EU | Standard Liège (Belgium) | Transfer | Summer | 2013 | Free | liverpoolfc.com |
| 22 | CB | (Scotland) | Danny Wilson | 18 | EU | Rangers (Scotland) | Transfer | Summer | 2014 | £2,000,000 | liverpoolfc.com |
| 10 | AM | (England) | Joe Cole | 28 | EU | Chelsea | Transfer | Summer | 2014 | Free | liverpoolfc.com |
| 28 | DM | (Denmark) | Christian Poulsen | 30 | EU | Juventus (Italy) | Transfer | Summer | 2013 | £4,500,000 | liverpoolfc.com |
| 1 | GK | (Australia) | Brad Jones | 28 | EU | Middlesbrough | Transfer | Summer | 2013 | £2,300,000 | liverpoolfc.com |
| 4 | CM | (Portugal) | Raul Meireles | 27 | EU | Porto (Portugal) | Transfer | Summer | 2014 | £11,500,000 | liverpoolfc.com |
| 3 | LB | (England) | Paul Konchesky | 29 | EU | Fulham | Transfer | Summer | 2014 | £3,000,000 | liverpoolfc.com |
| 7 | FW | (Uruguay) | Luis Suárez | 24 | EU | Ajax (Netherlands) | Transfer | Winter | 2016 | £22,700,000 | liverpoolfc.com |
| 9 | ST | (England) | Andy Carroll | 22 | EU | Newcastle United | Transfer | Winter | 2016 | £35,000,000 | liverpoolfc.com |

Last updated: 31 January 2011

Reserves and Academy

| No. | Pos. | Nat. | Name | Age | EU | Moving from | Type | Transfer window | Ends | Transfer fee | Source |
|---|---|---|---|---|---|---|---|---|---|---|---|
| | MF | (Spain) | Suso | 16 | EU | Cádiz (Spain) | Transfer | Summer | 2013 | Undisclosed | liverpoolfc.com |
| | GK | (Turkey) | Yusuf Mersin | 16 | Non-EU | Millwall | Transfer | Winter | | Undisclosed | liverpoolfc.com |
| | CF | (England) | Jason Banton | 18 | EU | Free agent | Transfer | Winter | May 2011 | Free | liverpoolfc.com |

Last updated: 21 December

Total spending: ▼£82,800,000

=== Out ===
First Team

| No. | Pos. | Nat. | Name | Age | EU | Moving to | Type | Transfer window | Transfer fee | Source |
|---|---|---|---|---|---|---|---|---|---|---|
| 1 | GK | (Brazil) | Diego Cavalieri | 27 | Non-EU | Cesena (Italy) | Released | Summer | | liverpoolfc.tv |
| 15 | MF | (Israel) | Yossi Benayoun | 30 | Non-EU | Chelsea | Transfer | Summer | £5,500,000 | liverpoolfc.tv |
| 11 | MF | (Spain) | Albert Riera | 28 | EU | Olympiacos (Greece) | Transfer | Summer | £4,000,000 | liverpoolfc.tv |
| 20 | MF | (Argentina) | Javier Mascherano | 26 | EU | Barcelona (Spain) | Transfer | Summer | £17,250,000 | liverpoolfc.tv |
| 30 | GK | (France) | Charles Itandje | 28 | EU | Atromitos (Greece) | Released | Winter | | liverpoolfc.tv |
| 19 | FW | (Netherlands) | Ryan Babel | 24 | EU | 1899 Hoffenheim (Germany) | Transfer | Winter | £5,800,000 | liverpoolfc.tv |
| 9 | FW | (Spain) | Fernando Torres | 26 | EU | Chelsea | Transfer | Winter | £50,000,000 | liverpoolfc.tv |

Last updated: 31 January 2011

Reserves and Academy

| No. | Pos. | Nat. | Name | Age | EU | Moving to | Type | Transfer window | Transfer fee | Source |
|---|---|---|---|---|---|---|---|---|---|---|
| 29 | FW | (Hungary) | Krisztián Németh | 21 | EU | Olympiacos (Greece) | Transfer | Summer | £1,000,000 | liverpoolfc.tv |
| 37 | FW | (Finland) | Lauri Dalla Valle | 18 | EU | Fulham | Unknown | Summer | p/x | liverpoolfc.tv |
| 38 | DF | (England) | Robbie Threlfall | 21 | EU | Bradford City | Contract expired | Summer | Free | liverpoolfc.tv |
| 45 | DF | (Spain) | Mikel San José | 20 | EU | Athletic Bilbao (Spain) | Transfer | Summer | £2,600,000 | Athletic Bilbao |
| | FW | (Netherlands) | Jordy Brouwer | 22 | EU | ADO Den Haag (Netherlands) | Transfer | Winter | Free | liverpoolfc.tv |
| | MF | (Spain) | Francis Durán | 22 | EU | Free agent | Contract expired | Summer | Free | liverpoolfc.tv |
| | DF | (England) | Michael Ihiekwe | 17 | EU | Wolverhampton Wanderers | Released | Summer | | liverpoolfc.tv |
| | MF | (Sweden) | Alex Kačaniklić | 19 | EU | Fulham | Unknown | Summer | p/x | liverpoolfc.tv |
| | GK | (Bulgaria) | Nikolay Mihaylov | 22 | EU | Twente (Netherlands) | Transfer | Summer | £1,000,000 | liverpoolfc.tv |
| | GK | (Republic of Ireland) | Christopher Oldfield | 19 | EU | Chester | Contract expired | Summer | Free | liverpoolfc.tv |
| | MF | (Iceland) | Victor Pálsson | 19 | EU | Hibernian (Scotland) | Transfer | Winter | Free | liverpoolfc.tv |
| | MF | (France) | Damien Plessis | 22 | EU | Panathinaikos (Greece) | Transfer | Summer | undisc | liverpoolfc.tv |
| | MF | (Netherlands) | Vincent Weijl | 19 | EU | Eibar (Spain) | Unknown | Summer | Free | liverpoolfc.tv |

Last updated: 22 December

Total income: ▲£87,150,000

=== Loaned in ===
| # | Pos | Nat. | Player | From | Start | End |
|---|---|---|---|---|---|---|
| – | MF | (Hungary) | Ádám Hajdú | (Hungary) MTK Hungária | 31 August 2010 | 30 June 2011 |
| – | MF | (England) | Conor Thomas | (England) Coventry City | 31 January 2011 | 30 June 2011 |

=== Loaned out ===
| # | Pos | Nat. | Player | To | Start | End |
|---|---|---|---|---|---|---|
| 3 | LB | (England) | Paul Konchesky | (England) Nottingham Forest | 31 January 2011 | 3 May 2011 |
| 4 | CM | (Italy) | Alberto Aquilani | (Italy) Juventus | 21 August 2010 | 30 June 2011 |
| 22 | LB | (Argentina) | Emiliano Insúa | (Turkey) Galatasaray | 31 August 2010 | 30 June 2011 |
| 27 | RWB | (Switzerland) | Philipp Degen | (Germany) VfB Stuttgart | 5 August 2010 | 30 June 2011 |
| 31 | RW | (Morocco) | Nabil El Zhar | (Greece) PAOK | 31 August 2010 | 30 June 2011 |
| 32 | RB | (England) | Stephen Darby | (England) Notts County | 1 November 2010 | 31 May 2011 |
| 39 | ST | (England) | Nathan Eccleston | (England) Charlton Athletic | 13 January 2011 | 30 June 2011 |
| 40 | CB | (Spain) | Daniel Ayala | (England) Hull City | 11 September 2010 | 1 January 2011 |
| 40 | CB | (Spain) | Daniel Ayala | (England) Derby County | 11 February 2011 | 30 June 2011 |
| 42 | GK | (Hungary) | Péter Gulácsi | (England) Tranmere Rovers | 17 September 2010 | 24 November 2010 |
| 44 | CM | (Iceland) | Victor Pálsson | (England) Dagenham & Redbridge | 4 November 2010 | 4 January 2011 |
| 45 | LM | (England) | Tom Ince | (England) Notts County | 1 November 2010 | 3 January 2011 |
| – | LB | (France) | Chris Mavinga | (Belgium) Genk | 1 January 2011 | 30 May 2011 |
| – | MF | (England) | Sean Highdale | (Wales) Newtown | 21 January 2011 | 15 May 2011 |
| 46 | MF | (England) | David Amoo | (England) MK Dons | 25 January 2011 | 23 February 2011 |
| 46 | MF | (England) | David Amoo | (England) Hull City | 28 February 2011 | 30 June 2011 |
| 1 | GK | (Australia) | Brad Jones | (England) Derby County | 24 March 2011 | 30 June 2011 |
| 12 | FW | (Spain) | Dani Pacheco | (England) Norwich City | 24 March 2011 | 30 June 2011 |

=== Totals ===
| Period | Spending | Income | Loss/Gain |
|---|---|---|---|
| Summer | ▼£25,025,000 | ▲£31,350,000 | ▲£6,325,000 |
| Winter | ▼£57,800,000 | ▲£55,800,000 | ▼£2,000,000 |
| Totals | ▼£82,825,000 | ▲£87,150,000 | ▲£4,325,000 |

== Competitions ==
=== Overall ===
| Competition | Started round | Final position / round | First match | Last match |
|---|---|---|---|---|
| Premier League | — | 6th | 14 Aug 2010 | 22 May 2011 |
| UEFA Europa League | Third qualifying round | Round of 16 | 29 July 2010 | 17 March 2011 |
| Football League Cup | 3rd round | 3rd round | 22 September 2010 | |
| FA Cup | 3rd round | 3rd round | 9 January 2011 | |

Updated to match played 22 May 2011
Source: Competitions

=== League table ===
| Pos | Team | Pld | W | D | L | GF | GA | GD | Pts | Qualification or relegation |
|---|---|---|---|---|---|---|---|---|---|---|
| 4 | Arsenal | 38 | 19 | 11 | 8 | 72 | 43 | +29 | 68 | Qualification for the Champions League play-off round |
| 5 | Tottenham Hotspur | 38 | 16 | 14 | 8 | 55 | 46 | +9 | 62 | Qualification for the Europa League play-off round |
| 6 | Liverpool | 38 | 17 | 7 | 14 | 59 | 44 | +15 | 58 | |
| 7 | Everton | 38 | 13 | 15 | 10 | 51 | 45 | +6 | 54 | |
| 8 | Fulham | 38 | 11 | 16 | 11 | 49 | 43 | +6 | 49 | Qualification for the Europa League first qualifying round (Note: Fulham, as the highest-ranked team from the Fair Play table not yet qualified for any European competition, entered the first qualifying round of the Europa League.) |

Source: Barclays Premier League
Rules for classification: 1) points; 2) goal difference; 3) number of goals scored.

==== Results by round ====
| Round | 1 | 2 | 3 | 4 | 5 | 6 | 7 | 8 | 9 | 10 | 11 | 12 | 13 | 14 | 15 | 16 | 17 | 18 | 19 | 20 | 21 | 22 | 23 | 24 | 25 | 26 | 27 | 28 | 29 | 30 | 31 | 32 | 33 | 34 | 35 | 36 | 37 | 38 |
|---|---|---|---|---|---|---|---|---|---|---|---|---|---|---|---|---|---|---|---|---|---|---|---|---|---|---|---|---|---|---|---|---|---|---|---|---|---|---|
| Ground | H | A | H | A | A | H | H | A | H | A | H | A | A | H | A | H | A | H | H | A | A | H | A | H | H | A | H | A | H | A | A | H | A | H | H | A | H | A |
| Result | D | L | W | D | L | D | L | L | W | W | W | D | L | W | L | W | L | L | W | L | L | D | W | W | W | W | D | L | W | W | L | W | D | W | W | W | L | L |
| Position | 10 | 17 | 13 | 13 | 16 | 15 | 18 | 19 | 18 | 12 | 9 | 9 | 11 | 9 | 10 | 8 | 9 | 12 | 9 | 12 | 13 | 13 | 10 | 7 | 7 | 6 | 6 | 6 | 6 | 6 | 6 | 6 | 6 | 6 | 5 | 5 | 6 | 6 |

Updated to match(es) played on 22 May 2011. Source: competitive matches
A = Away; H = Home; W = Win; D = Draw; L = Loss

==== Results summary ====
| Overall | | | | | | | | Home | | | | | | Away | | | | | |
| Pld | W | D | L | GF | GA | GD | Pts | W | D | L | GF | GA | GD | W | D | L | GF | GA | GD |
|---|---|---|---|---|---|---|---|---|---|---|---|---|---|---|---|---|---|---|---|
| 38 | 17 | 7 | 14 | 59 | 44 | +15 | 58 | 12 | 4 | 3 | 37 | 14 | +23 | 5 | 3 | 11 | 22 | 30 | −8 |

Last updated: 22 May 2011.
Source: Premier League

==== Games against the top six ====
| Overall | | | | | | | | Home | | | | | | Away | | | | | |
| Pld | W | D | L | GF | GA | GD | Pts | W | D | L | GF | GA | GD | W | D | L | GF | GA | GD |
|---|---|---|---|---|---|---|---|---|---|---|---|---|---|---|---|---|---|---|---|
| 10 | 4 | 2 | 4 | 14 | 13 | +1 | 14 | 3 | 1 | 1 | 9 | 4 | +5 | 1 | 1 | 3 | 5 | 9 | −4 |

==== Big Four games ====
| Overall | | | | | | | | Home | | | | | | Away | | | | | |
| Pld | W | D | L | GF | GA | GD | Pts | W | D | L | GF | GA | GD | W | D | L | GF | GA | GD |
|---|---|---|---|---|---|---|---|---|---|---|---|---|---|---|---|---|---|---|---|
| 6 | 3 | 2 | 1 | 10 | 6 | +4 | 11 | 2 | 1 | 0 | 6 | 2 | +4 | 1 | 1 | 1 | 4 | 4 | 0 |

==== Premier League ====
| 15 August 2010 1 | Liverpool | 1–1 | Arsenal | Liverpool |
| 16:00 BST | Cole (red card) 45'; Ngog 46'; Gerrard (yellow card) 75' | Report | Wilshere (yellow card) 41'; Rosický (yellow card) 85'; Reina 90+1' (o.g.); Koscielny (yellow card) 90+2' (yellow-red card) 90+5' | Stadium: Anfield; Attendance: 44,722; Referee: Martin Atkinson |

| 23 August 2010 2 | Manchester City | 3–0 | Liverpool | Manchester |
| 20:00 BST | Barry 12'; Tevez 51', 67' (pen.); Richards (yellow card) 58' | Report | Škrtel (yellow card) 4' | Stadium: City of Manchester Stadium; Attendance: 47,087; Referee: Phil Dowd |

| 29 August 2010 3 | Liverpool | 1–0 | West Bromwich Albion | Liverpool |
| 15:00 BST | Torres 66' | Report | | Stadium: Anfield; Attendance: 41,194; Referee: Lee Probert |

| 12 September 2010 4 | Birmingham City | 0–0 | Liverpool | Birmingham |
| 16:00 BST | | Report | | Stadium: St Andrew's; Attendance: 27,333; Referee: Mark Halsey |

| 19 September 2010 5 | Manchester United | 3–2 | Liverpool | Manchester |
| 13:30 BST | Berbatov 42', 59', 84'; Rooney (yellow card) 57'; Evans (yellow card) 63'; Scholes (yellow card) 68'; O'Shea (yellow card) 69' | Report | Gerrard 64' (pen.), 70'; Ngog (yellow card) 66' | Stadium: Old Trafford; Attendance: 75,213; Referee: Howard Webb |

| 25 September 2010 6 | Liverpool | 2–2 | Sunderland | Liverpool |
| 15:00 BST | Kuyt 5'; Gerrard 64' | Report | Bent 25' (pen.), 48' | Stadium: Anfield; Attendance: 43,626; Referee: Stuart Attwell |

| 3 October 2010 7 | Liverpool | 1–2 | Blackpool | Liverpool |
| 15:00 BST | Kyrgiakos 53' | Report | Adam 29' (pen.); Varney 45+2' | Stadium: Anfield; Attendance: 43,156; Referee: Mike Jones |

| 17 October 2010 8 | Everton | 2–0 | Liverpool | Liverpool |
| 13:30 BST | Cahill (yellow card) 28', (goal) 34'; Arteta 50'; Beckford (yellow card) 76' | Report | Rodríguez (yellow card) 18'; Meireles (yellow card) 31'; Torres (yellow card) 88' | Stadium: Goodison Park; Attendance: 39,673; Referee: Howard Webb |

| 24 October 2010 9 | Liverpool | 2–1 | Blackburn Rovers | Liverpool |
| 15:00 BST | Kyrgiakos 48'; Torres 53'; Rodríguez (yellow card) 67'; Meireles (yellow card) 82' | Report | Olsson (yellow card) 28'; Givet (yellow card) 28'; Carragher 51' (o.g.); Grella (yellow card) 90+4' | Stadium: Anfield; Attendance: 43,328; Referee: Phil Dowd |

| 31 October 2010 10 | Bolton Wanderers | 0–1 | Liverpool | Bolton |
| 16:00 GMT | Taylor (yellow card) 49'; Steinsson (yellow card) 89' | Report | Konchesky (yellow card) 21'; Škrtel (yellow card) 75'; Rodríguez 86' | Stadium: Reebok Stadium; Attendance: 25,171; Referee: Martin Atkinson |

| 7 November 2010 11 | Liverpool | 2–0 | Chelsea | Liverpool |
| 16:00 BST | Torres 11', 44' | Report | Zhirkov (yellow card) 20' | Stadium: Anfield; Attendance: 44,238; Referee: Howard Webb |

| 10 November 2010 12 | Wigan Athletic | 1–1 | Liverpool | Wigan |
| 19:45 GMT | Rodallega 52' | Report | Torres 7' | Stadium: DW Stadium; Attendance: 16,754; Referee: Peter Walton |

| 13 November 2010 13 | Stoke City | 2–0 | Liverpool | Stoke-on-Trent |
| 17:30 GMT | Fuller 56'; Jones 90+1' | Report | | Stadium: Britannia Stadium; Attendance: 27,286; Referee: Mark Halsey |

| 20 November 2010 14 | Liverpool | 3–0 | West Ham United | Liverpool |
| 17:30 GMT | Johnson 18'; Kuyt 27' (pen.); Rodríguez 38' | Report | | Stadium: Anfield; Attendance: 43,024; Referee: Lee Probert |

| 28 November 2010 15 | Tottenham Hotspur | 2–1 | Liverpool | London |
| 16:00 GMT | Škrtel 65' (o.g.); Lennon 90+2' | Report | Škrtel 42' | Stadium: White Hart Lane; Attendance: 36,310; Referee: Martin Atkinson |

| 6 December 2010 16 | Liverpool | 3–0 | Aston Villa | Liverpool |
| 20:00 GMT | Ngog 14'; Babel 16'; Rodríguez 55' | Report | | Stadium: Anfield; Attendance: 39,079; Referee: Phil Dowd |

| 11 December 2010 17 | Newcastle United | 3–1 | Liverpool | Newcastle |
| 17:30 GMT | Nolan 15'; Barton 80'; Carroll 90+1' | Report | Kuyt 49' | Stadium: St. James' Park; Attendance: 50,137; Referee: Lee Mason |

| 29 December 2010 18 | Liverpool | 0–1 | Wolverhampton Wanderers | Liverpool |
| 20:00 GMT | | Report | Ward 56' | Stadium: Anfield; Attendance: 41,614; Referee: Peter Walton |

| 1 January 2011 19 | Liverpool | 2–1 | Bolton Wanderers | Liverpool |
| 15:00 GMT | Torres 49'; Cole 90+2' | Report | Davies 43' | Stadium: Anfield; Attendance: 35,400; Referee: Kevin Friend |

| 5 January 2011 20 | Blackburn Rovers | 3–1 | Liverpool | Blackburn |
| 20:00 GMT | Olsson 32'; Benjani 38', 57' | Report | Gerrard 81' | Stadium: Ewood Park; Attendance: 24,522; Referee: Andre Marriner |

| 12 January 2011 21 | Blackpool | 2–1 | Liverpool | Blackpool |
| 20:00 GMT | Taylor-Fletcher 12'; Campbell 69' | Report | Torres 3' | Stadium: Bloomfield Road; Attendance: 16,089; Referee: Michael Oliver |

| 16 January 2011 22 | Liverpool | 2–2 | Everton | Liverpool |
| 14:05 GMT | Meireles 29'; Reina (yellow card) 53'; Torres (yellow card) 63'; Kuyt 68' (pen.), (yellow card) 89' | Report | Distin 46'; Beckford 49' | Stadium: Anfield; Attendance: 44,795; Referee: Phil Dowd |

| 22 January 2011 23 | Wolverhampton Wanderers | 0–3 | Liverpool | Wolverhampton |
| 12:45 GMT | | Report | Torres 36', 90+1'; Meireles 50' | Stadium: Molineux; Attendance: 28,869; Referee: Martin Atkinson |

| 26 January 2011 24 | Liverpool | 1–0 | Fulham | Liverpool |
| 20:00 GMT | Pantsil 52' (o.g.) | Report | | Stadium: Anfield; Attendance: 40,466; Referee: Lee Probert |

| 2 February 2011 25 | Liverpool | 2–0 | Stoke City | Liverpool |
| 20:00 GMT | Meireles 47'; Suárez 79' | Report | | Stadium: Anfield; Attendance: 40,254; Referee: Anthony Taylor |

| 6 February 2011 26 | Chelsea | 0–1 | Liverpool | London |
| 16:00 GMT | Mikel (yellow card) 1' | Report | Meireles 69'; Lucas (yellow card) 74' | Stadium: Stamford Bridge; Attendance: 41,829; Referee: Andre Marriner |

| 12 February 2011 27 | Liverpool | 1–1 | Wigan Athletic | Liverpool |
| 15:00 GMT | Meireles 24' | Report | Gohouri 65' | Stadium: Anfield; Attendance: 44,609; Referee: Kevin Friend |

| 27 February 2011 28 | West Ham United | 3–1 | Liverpool | London |
| 13:30 GMT | Parker 22'; Ba 45'; Cole 90+1' | Report | Johnson 84' | Stadium: Upton Park; Attendance: 34,941; Referee: Mark Halsey |

| 6 March 2011 29 | Liverpool | 3–1 | Manchester United | Liverpool |
| 13:30 GMT | Kuyt 34', 39', 65'; Carragher (yellow card) 45+1'; Škrtel (yellow card) 45+5' | Report | van der Sar (yellow card) 45+2'; Rafael (yellow card) 45+5'; Scholes (yellow card) 83'; Hernández 90' | Stadium: Anfield; Attendance: 44,753; Referee: Phil Dowd |

| 20 March 2011 30 | Sunderland | 0–2 | Liverpool | Sunderland |
| 13:30 GMT | | Report | Kuyt 34' (pen.); Suárez 77' | Stadium: Stadium of Light; Attendance: 47,207; Referee: Kevin Friend |

| 2 April 2011 31 | West Bromwich Albion | 2–1 | Liverpool | West Bromwich |
| 15:00 BST | Brunt 62' (pen.), 88' (pen.) | Report | Škrtel 50' | Stadium: The Hawthorns; Attendance: 26,196; Referee: Martin Atkinson |

| 11 April 2011 32 | Liverpool | 3–0 | Manchester City | Liverpool |
| 20:00 BST | Carroll 13', 35'; Aurélio (yellow card) 27'; Kuyt 34' | Report | | Stadium: Anfield; Attendance: 44,776; Referee: Mark Halsey |

| 17 April 2011 33 | Arsenal | 1–1 | Liverpool | London |
| 16:00 BST | Van Persie 90+8' (pen.), (yellow card) 90+8'; Eboué (yellow card) 90+10' | Report | Flanagan (yellow card) 30'; Škrtel (yellow card) 34'; Shelvey (yellow card) 76'; Lucas (yellow card) 90+10'; Kuyt 90+12' (pen.) | Stadium: Emirates Stadium; Attendance: 60,029; Referee: Andre Marriner |

| 23 April 2011 34 | Liverpool | 5–0 | Birmingham City | Liverpool |
| 15:00 BST | Rodríguez 7', 66', 73'; Kuyt 23'; Cole 85' | Report | | Stadium: Anfield; Attendance: 44,734; Referee: Howard Webb |

| 1 May 2011 35 | Liverpool | 3–0 | Newcastle United | Liverpool |
| 12:00 BST | Rodríguez 10'; Kuyt 59' (pen.); Suárez 65' | Report | | Stadium: Anfield; Attendance: 44,923; Referee: Peter Walton |

| 9 May 2011 36 | Fulham | 2–5 | Liverpool | London |
| 20:00 BST | Dembélé 56'; Sidwell 86' | Report | Rodríguez 1', 7', 70'; Kuyt 16'; Suárez 75' | Stadium: Craven Cottage; Attendance: 25,693; Referee: Lee Mason |

| 15 May 2011 37 | Liverpool | 0–2 | Tottenham Hotspur | Liverpool |
| 16:00 BST | | Report | Van der Vaart 9'; Modrić 56' (pen.) | Stadium: Anfield; Attendance: 44,893; Referee: Howard Webb |

| 22 May 2011 38 | Aston Villa | 1–0 | Liverpool | Birmingham |
| 16:00 BST | Downing 33' | Report | | Stadium: Villa Park; Attendance: 42,785; Referee: Lee Probert |

==== UEFA Europa League ====
===== Qualifying =====
====== Third qualifying round ======
| 29 July 2010 Q3 L1 | Rabotnički (North Macedonia) | 0–2 | (England) Liverpool | Skopje, Macedonia |
| 20:45 CEST | | Report | Ngog 17', 58' | Stadium: Philip II Arena; Attendance: 23,000; Referee: Antonio Damato (Italy) |

| 5 August 2010 Q3 L2 | Liverpool (England) | 2–0 (4–0 agg.) | (North Macedonia) Rabotnički | Liverpool |
| 20:45 CEST | Ngog 21'; Gerrard 40' (pen.) | Report | | Stadium: Anfield; Attendance: 31,202; Referee: Peter Sippel (Germany) |

====== Play-off Round ======
| 19 August 2010 PO L1 | Liverpool (England) | 1–0 | (Turkey) Trabzonspor | Liverpool |
| 20:45 CEST | Babel 45+1' | Report | | Stadium: Anfield; Attendance: 40,941; Referee: Thomas Einwaller (Austria) |

| 26 August 2010 PO L2 | Trabzonspor (Turkey) | 1–2 (1–3 agg.) | (England) Liverpool | Trabzon, Turkey |
| 19:30 CEST | Gutiérrez 4' | Report | Kaçar 83' (o.g.); Kuyt 88' | Stadium: Hüseyin Avni Aker Stadium; Attendance: 21,065; Referee: Ivan Bebek (Croatia) |

===== Group stage =====
| Team | Pld | W | D | L | GF | GA | GD | Pts |
|---|---|---|---|---|---|---|---|---|
| (England) Liverpool | 6 | 2 | 4 | 0 | 8 | 3 | +5 | 10 |
| (Italy) Napoli | 6 | 1 | 4 | 1 | 8 | 9 | −1 | 7 |
| (Romania) Steaua București | 6 | 1 | 3 | 2 | 9 | 11 | −2 | 6 |
| (Netherlands) Utrecht | 6 | 0 | 5 | 1 | 5 | 7 | −2 | 5 |

| 16 September 2010 GS R1 | Liverpool (England) | 4–1 | (Romania) Steaua București | Liverpool |
| 21:05 CEST | Cole 1'; Ngog 55' (pen.), 90+1'; Lucas 81' | Report | Tănase 13' | Stadium: Anfield; Attendance: 25,605; Referee: César Muñiz Fernández (Spain) |

| 30 September 2010 GS R2 | Utrecht (Netherlands) | 0–0 | (England) Liverpool | Utrecht, Netherlands |
| 19:00 CEST | | Report | | Stadium: Stadion Galgenwaard; Attendance: 23,662; Referee: Duarte Gomes (Portugal) |

| 21 October 2010 GS R3 | Napoli (Italy) | 0–0 | (England) Liverpool | Naples, Italy |
| 19:00 CEST | | Report | | Stadium: Stadio San Paolo; Attendance: 55,489; Referee: Thorsten Kinhöfer (Germany) |

| 4 November 2010 GS R4 | Liverpool (England) | 3–1 | (Italy) Napoli | Liverpool |
| 21:05 CET | Gerrard 75', 88' (pen.), 89' | Report | Lavezzi 28' | Stadium: Anfield; Attendance: 33,895; Referee: Fredy Fautrel (France) |

| 2 December 2010 GS R5 | Steaua București (Romania) | 1–1 | (England) Liverpool | Bucharest, Romania |
| 19:00 CET | Bonfim 61' | Report | Jovanović 19' | Stadium: Stadionul Steaua; Attendance: 9,500; Referee: Bulent Yıldırım (Turkey) |

| 15 December 2010 GS R6 | Liverpool (England) | 0–0 | (Netherlands) Utrecht | Liverpool |
| 21:05 CET | | Report | | Stadium: Anfield; Attendance: 37,800; Referee: Kristinn Jakobsson (Iceland) |

===== Knockout rounds =====
====== Round of 32 ======
| 17 February 2011 First Leg | Sparta Prague (Czech Republic) | 0–0 | (England) Liverpool | Prague, Czech Republic |
| 21:05 CET | | Report | | Stadium: Generali Arena; Attendance: 17,564; Referee: Florian Meyer (Germany) |

| 24 February 2011 Second Leg | Liverpool (England) | 1–0 (1–0 agg.) | (Czech Republic) Sparta Prague | Liverpool |
| 19:00 CET | Kuyt 86' | Report | | Stadium: Anfield; Attendance: 42,949; Referee: Milorad Mažić (Serbia) |

====== Round of 16 ======
| 10 March 2011 First Leg | Braga (Portugal) | 1–0 | (England) Liverpool | Braga, Portugal |
| 19:00 CET | Alan 18' (pen.) | Report | | Stadium: Estádio AXA; Attendance: 12,991; Referee: Serge Gumienny (Belgium) |

| 17 March 2011 Second Leg | Liverpool (England) | 0–0 (0–1 agg.) | (Portugal) Braga | Liverpool |
| 21:05 CET | | Report | | Stadium: Anfield; Attendance: 37,494; Referee: Gianluca Rocchi (Italy) |

Last updated: 17 March 2011
Source: Liverpool F.C.

==== FA Cup ====
| 9 January 2011 R3 | Manchester United | 1–0 | Liverpool | Manchester |
| 13:30 GMT | Giggs 2' (pen.); Fletcher (yellow card) 9'; Anderson (yellow card) 64' | Report | Gerrard (red card) 32' | Stadium: Old Trafford; Attendance: 74,727; Referee: Howard Webb |

==== League Cup ====
| 22 September 2010 R3 | Liverpool | 2 – 2 (a.e.t.) (2–4 p) | Northampton Town | Liverpool |
| 20:00 BST | Jovanović 9'; Ngog 116' | Report | 56' McKay; 98' Jacobs | Stadium: Anfield; Attendance: 22,577; Referee: Anthony Taylor |
| | Penalties |
| | Ngog (penalty missed); Shelvey (penalty scored); Agger (penalty scored); Eccleston (penalty missed) | | (penalty missed) Guinan; (penalty scored) Thornton; (penalty scored) Davis; (penalty scored) Jacobs; (penalty scored) Osman |

=== Pre-season ===
| 17 July 2010 | Al-Hilal | P – P | Liverpool | Altach, Austria |
| 18:00 BST | | Report | | Stadium: Cashpoint Arena |

| 21 July 2010 | Grasshopper | 0–0 | Liverpool | Zug, Switzerland |
| 18:30 BST | | Report | | Stadium: Herti Allmend Stadion |

| 24 July 2010 | 1. FC Kaiserslautern | 1–0 | Liverpool | Kaiserslautern, Germany |
| 15:15 BST | Mitsanski 32' | Report | | Stadium: Fritz Walter Stadion |

| 1 August 2010 | Borussia Mönchengladbach | 1–0 | Liverpool | Mönchengladbach, Germany |
| 13:30 BST | Matmour 8' | Report | | Stadium: Borussia-Park |

=== Other ===
==== Jamie Carragher Testimonial ====
| 4 September 2010 | Liverpool XI | 4–1 | Everton XI | Liverpool |
| 14:00 BST | García; Carragher (pen.); Eccleston; Cole | Report | Carragher (pen. / o.g.) | Stadium: Anfield; Attendance: 35,361; Referee: James McCartny |

Last updated: 21 July 2010
Source: Liverpool F.C.

== Reserves ==
Updated 12 May 2011. Squad Numbers refer to players' first team squad number (for season 2010/11), where applicable. Reserve and youth games are 1–11.

Note: Flags indicate national team as defined under FIFA eligibility rules; some limited exceptions apply. Players may hold more than one non-FIFA nationality.

| No. | Pos. | Nation | Player |
|---|---|---|---|
| 30 | MF | ESP | Suso |
| 31 | MF | ENG | Raheem Sterling |
| 35 | DF | ENG | Conor Coady |
| 36 | DF | ENG | Steven Irwin |
| 38 | DF | ENG | Jon Flanagan |
| 39 | FW | ENG | Nathan Eccleston |
| 40 | DF | ESP | Daniel Ayala |
| 41 | GK | DEN | Martin Hansen |
| 43 | GK | AUS | Dean Bouzanis (until 30 April 2011) |
| 44 | DF | ESP | Emmanuel Mendy |
| 45 | MF | ENG | Tom Ince |

| No. | Pos. | Nation | Player |
|---|---|---|---|
| 46 | FW | ENG | David Amoo |
| 47 | DF | ENG | Andre Wisdom |
| 48 | MF | ARG | Gerardo Bruna |
| 49 | DF | ENG | Jack Robinson |
| — | GK | ENG | Deale Chamberlain |
| — | DF | FRA | Chris Mavinga (on loan to Genk) |
| — | DF | CZE | Jakub Sokolík |
| — | MF | SCO | Alex Cooper |
| — | MF | ENG | Conor Thomas (on loan from Coventry City) |
| — | MF | ENG | Michael Roberts |
| — | FW | DEN | Nikola Sarić |

== Academy (Under-18s) ==
The following players played for the team during the Premier Academy League 2010–11 Ages are as of July, 2010. Updated 14 January 2011.

| | Player | DOB | Position | International caps | Profile |
3rd Year Academy (players born between 1 September 1991 and 31 August 1992)
2nd Year Academy (players born between 1 September 1992 and 31 August 1993)
| (Hungary) | Krisztián Adorján | 19 January 1993 (aged 17) | FW | (Hungary) Capped at Under-17 level | View |
| (England) | Jason Banton | 15 December 1992 (aged 17) | FW | (England) Capped at Under-17 level | View |
| (England) | Karl Clair | 30 September 1992 (aged 17) | MF | – | View |
| (England) | Conor Coady | 25 February 1993 (aged 17) | DF | (England) Capped at Under-18 level | View |
| (Iceland) | Kristján Emilsson | 26 April 1993 (aged 17) | MF | (Iceland) Capped at Under-19 level | View |
| (England) | Jon Flanagan | 21 January 1993 (aged 17) | DF | – | View |
| (Hungary) | Ádám Hajdú (on loan from MTK Hungária) | 16 January 1993 (aged 17) | MF | (Hungary) Capped at Under-17 level | – |
| (England) | Michael Ihiekwe | 20 November 1992 (aged 17) | DF | – | View |
| (England) | Matthew McGiveron | 3 September 1992 (aged 17) | DF | – | View |
| (England) | Michael Ngoo | 23 October 1992 (aged 17) | FW | (England) Capped at Under-19 level | View |
| (England) | Craig Roddan | 22 April 1993 (aged 17) | MF | – | View |
| (Germany) | Stephen Sama | 5 March 1993 (aged 17) | DF | (Germany) Capped at Under-17 level | View |
| (England) | Andre Wisdom | 9 May 1993 (aged 17) | DF/MF | (England) Capped at Under-19 level | View |
1st Year Academy (born on or after 1 September 1993)
| (England) | Peter Aylmer | 12 February 1994 (aged 16) | DF | – | View |
| (England) | Tyrell Belford | 6 May 1994 (aged 16) | GK | (England) Capped at Under-16 level | View |
| (England) | Lewis Hatch | 4 September 1993 (aged 16) | MF | – | View |
| (England) | Adam Morgan | 21 April 1994 (aged 16) | FW | (England) Capped at Under-17 level | View |
| (Democratic Republic of the Congo) | Henoc Mukendi | 20 November 1993 (aged 16) | FW | | View |
| (Hungary) | Patrik Poór | 15 November 1993 (aged 16) | DF | (Hungary) Capped at Under-17 level | View |
| (England) | Jack Robinson | 1 September 1993 (aged 16) | DF | (England) Capped at Under-18 level | – |
| (Republic of Ireland) | Joseph Rafferty | 6 October 1993 (aged 16) | DF | (Republic of Ireland) Capped at Under-18 level | View |
| (England) | Matthew Regan | 22 February 1994 (aged 16) | DF | (England) Capped at Under-17 level | View |
| (Portugal) | Toni Silva | 15 September 1993 (aged 16) | MF | (Portugal) Capped at Under-17 level | View |
| (England) | Brad Smith | 9 April 1994 (aged 16) | DF | – | View |
| (England) | Jamie Stephens | 25 August 1993 (aged 16) | GK | | View |
| (England) | Josh Sumner | 3 January 1994 (aged 16) | FW | – | View |
| (England) | Tom Walsh | 23 March 1994 (aged 16) | MF | – | View |
Unknown status
| (Czech Republic) | Jakub Sokolík | 28 August 1993 (aged 16) | DF | (Czech Republic) Capped at Under-16 level | – |
| (Portugal) | Gonçalo Filipe Gonçalves Serras Ribeiro | 23 February 1994 (aged 16) | FW | | – |
Notable Under 16s
| (England) | Jordan Lussey | | DF | Called-up at Under-17 level | – |
| (England) | Dave Moli | 30 November 1994 (aged 15) | FW | Called-up at Under-17 level | – |
| (England) | Raheem Sterling | 18 December 1994 (aged 15) | MF | (England) Capped at Under-17 level | – |
| (Portugal) | Iaia Embarlo | 18 August 1996 (aged 13) | FW | – | – |
