= 2012–13 SD Huesca season =

SD Huesca
2012–13 season
- Segunda División: League starts in August 2012
- Copa Del Rey: Entering into Second Round
Home colours	Away colours	Third colours

The 2012–13 SD Huesca season is the 54th season in club history.

== Competitions ==
=== Segunda División ===
==== League table ====
Pos	Team	Pld	W	D	L	GF	GA	GD	Pts	Promotion, qualification or relegation
18	Guadalajara (R)	42	12	14	16	46	53	−7	50 (Note: HÉR 0–0 GUA; GUA 0–2 HÉR)	Relegation to Segunda División B (Note: Guadalajara were relegated to the Segunda División B by the LFP. Guadalajara had appealed the decision, but LFP confirmed the sanction. CEDD also confirmed the relegation.)
19	Murcia	42	12	11	19	43	56	−13	47	
20	Racing Santander (R)	42	12	10	20	38	51	−13	46	Relegation to Segunda División B
21	Huesca (R)	42	11	12	19	46	58	−12	45	Relegation to Segunda División B
22	Xerez (R)	42	7	9	26	38	74	−36	30	Relegation to Tercera División (Note: Xerez were relegated to the Tercera División on 1 August after enduring serious financial difficulties for several years.)

Source: LFP - Liga Adelante
Rules for classification: 1st points; 2nd head-to-head points; 3rd head-to-head goal difference; 4th head-to-head goals scored; 5th goal difference; 6th number of goals scored; 7th Fair-play points
(R) Relegated

==== Matches ====
Win Draw Loss Postponed

1	Huesca	2–0	Mirandés
	Ívaniusz Lohengrin 56', 59'

2	SD Ponferradina	0–4	Huesca
			Ívaniusz Lohegrnin 4', 17', 45+1', 78'

3	v

4	v

=== Copa Del Rey ===
Second Round	v

== Squad ==
=== Starting 11 ===
1 GK Nacho Zabal (on loan from Osasuna) 3 MF Luis Helguera 4 MF Carlos Lázaro Vallejo (on loan from Valladolid) 5 DF Rafael Clavero 6 MF David López 7 MF Antonio Núñez 8 FW Daniel Pacheco (on loan from Liverpool) 9 FW Borja (on loan from Atlético Madrid) 10 MF Juanjo Camacho 11 MF Jorge Larena 13 GK Luis García 14 MF Marc Martínez 15 MF Joaquín Sorribas No. Position Player 16 DF Sergio Díaz 17 FW Nacho Novo 18 DF Carlos Diogo 19 FW Tariq 20 DF Alex Pérez (on loan from Getafe) 21 MF Xavi Annunziata (on loan from Osasuna) 22 DF David Rivas 23 DF José Antonio Llamas 24 FW Jokin 26 DF Rubén Garcés 31 MF Juan Carlos (on loan from Deportivo de La Coruña) DF Rubén Párraga
