= Martin Kelly (footballer) =

English footballer (born 1990)

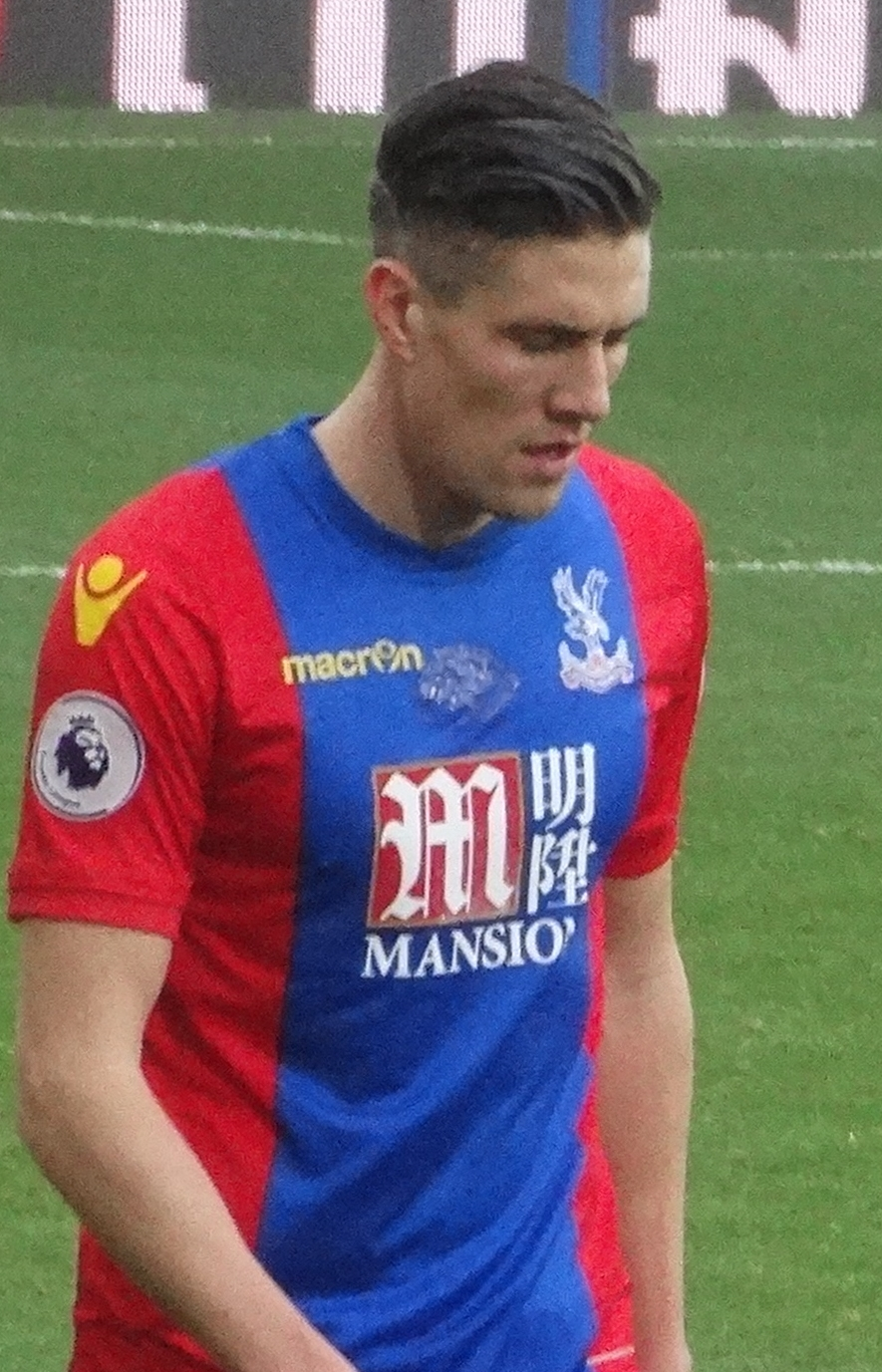
- Kelly playing for Crystal Palace in 2016

Personal information
- Full name: Martin Ronald Kelly
- Date of birth: 27 April 1990 (age 36)
- Place of birth: Whiston, England
- Height: 6 ft 3 in (1.91 m)
- Positions: Centre-back; right-back

Youth career
- 1997–2008: Liverpool

Senior career*
Years	Team	Apps	(Gls)
2008–2014	Liverpool	33	(0)
2009	→ Huddersfield Town (loan)	7	(1)
2014–2022	Crystal Palace	121	(0)
2022–2024	West Bromwich Albion	5	(0)
2023	→ Wigan Athletic (loan)	1	(0)
Total		167	(1)

International career
2009	England U19	5	(0)
2009	England U20	4	(0)
2010–2012	England U21	8	(3)
2012	England	1	(0)
- * Club domestic league appearances and goals

Martin Ronald Kelly (born 27 April 1990) is an English former professional footballer who played as a centre-back or right-back.

Kelly began his career at Liverpool, making 62 appearances across all competitions from his debut in 2008, and winning the League Cup in 2012. In 2014, he transferred to Crystal Palace for a fee of £2 million. In 2022, he signed for West Bromwich Albion on a free transfer. He later retired from football in October 2025.

He played two minutes for England in a friendly against Norway on 26 May 2012, making him the England player with the shortest international career. He was an unused member of their squad for UEFA Euro 2012.

== Club career ==
=== Liverpool ===
Kelly was born in Whiston, Merseyside and raised in Newton-le-Willows by his parents where he attended St Mary's Primary and then St Aelred's Catholic Technology College. He joined Liverpool at the age of seven and came through Academy ranks.

Kelly was promoted to Melwood from the club's academy in the summer of 2007. In an interview for Liverpool's official website he spoke about his delight at making the step up despite missing roughly two years of football for the youth team due to back problems. Kelly broke into Gary Ablett's title winning reserves team during 2007–08. He scored the second goal in Liverpool's 3–0 win over Tigres UANL in the 2008 Dallas Cup final on 23 March 2008.

Ahead of the 2008–09 season he received a first-team squad number. He earned his first call up to the senior team in November 2008 when he was an unused substitute in Liverpool's UEFA Champions League group stage match against Marseille. Not long after, he debuted as a substitute for Jamie Carragher in the same competition against PSV Eindhoven on 9 December 2008.

On 26 March 2009, as the loan transfer window closed, Kelly joined League One club Huddersfield Town on loan until the end of the season. He made his debut for the Terriers as a left-back in the 2–1 win over Bristol Rovers at the Memorial Stadium on 31 March 2009, and received praise for his composed performance. On 18 April, he scored his first goal in professional football, scoring the winner in Huddersfield's 3–2 win over Walsall at the Bescot Stadium.

Rafael Benítez suggested that the departure of Sami Hyypiä from Liverpool could open a window for Kelly into the first team, with his progress expected to be monitored closely in pre-season. Kelly made his first competitive start for Liverpool as a right back against Lyon in the UEFA Champions League on 20 October 2009, in which he walked off injured in the 74th minute. He was named man of the match by Liverpool's official website. He made his return from a groin injury on 25 February 2010, coming on as a substitute against FC Unirea Urziceni in the UEFA Europa League. He then made his Premier League debut replacing Glen Johnson in the 4–1 win over Portsmouth at Anfield.

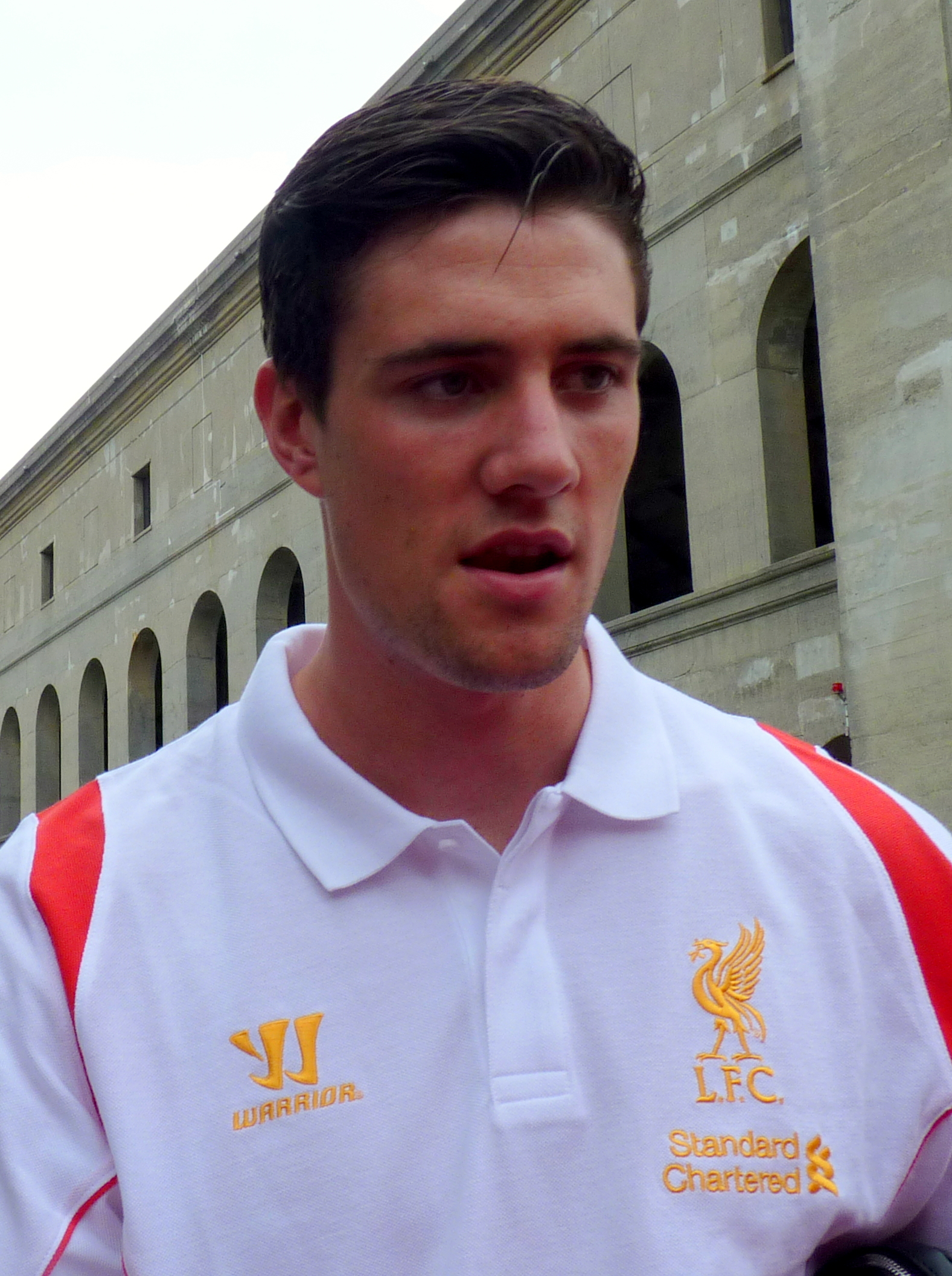
Kelly with Liverpool in 2012

Kelly made his first Premier League start of the season as an emergency replacement for Sotirios Kyrgiakos on 7 November 2010 against Chelsea in a match which Liverpool won 2–0. He subsequently started in the Merseyside derby on 16 January 2011, forcing Liverpool's first choice Glen Johnson to play left back. He won the Liverpoolfc.tv journalist's Man of the Match Award for his performance against Everton. Jamie Carragher complimented his talents by saying "I was in the stand against Everton and when he made that run past Leighton Baines, I thought it was Thierry Henry against me all those years ago. It was turbo charged."

On 20 August 2011, Kelly played for the whole match away to Arsenal and helped Liverpool keep a clean sheet in a 2–0 victory. He nearly scored in the second half, as his shot from 15 yards hit the outside of the post. England manager, Fabio Capello, was present at the match and applauded his performance. On 29 November 2011, he scored a header against Chelsea as Liverpool won 2–0 at Stamford Bridge, sending them through to the semi-finals of the League Cup.

On 23 September 2012, he ruptured his anterior cruciate ligament against Manchester United and was ruled out of action for approximately six months. A year and three days later, he made his first competitive appearance since the injury, against the same opponents in the third round of the League Cup, replacing Lucas Leiva midway through the second half in a 1–0 win for the hosts. Brendan Rodgers insisted that the latter would get his chance fully as current first-choice right-back, as Glen Johnson was out for a month.

=== Crystal Palace ===
On 14 August 2014, Kelly joined Crystal Palace on a three-year deal, moving for a reported fee of £2 million. He totalled 34 matches (31 in the league) in his first season at Selhurst Park, as Palace finished 10th.

He scored his first goal for Palace, and first career goal since November 2011, on 21 February 2016, the only goal in the fifth round of the FA Cup against Tottenham Hotspur at White Hart Lane. He was an unused substitute in the final on 21 May, a 2–1 loss to Manchester United.

In February 2019 he signed a new contract with the club, until 2021. He was one of four players to sign a new contract on 21 August 2020.

In May 2022, Crystal Palace announced that Kelly would leave the club on the expiry of his contract at the end of June.

=== West Bromwich Albion ===
On 1 September 2022, Kelly signed for Championship club West Bromwich Albion on a two-year contract. On 5 October, Kelly made his first appearance for the Baggies in a 1–0 defeat to Preston North End.

==== Later career and retirement ====
In January 2023, Kelly signed for fellow Championship club Wigan Athletic on loan until the end of the 2022–23 season.

On 22 May 2024, West Brom announced that Kelly would be leaving the club in the summer when his contract expired.

On 10 October 2025, Kelly announced his decision to retire from professional football aged 35, after having been without a club for over a year.

== International career ==
=== England under-19 ===
Kelly was called up in early 2009 for the England U-19 squad that played Spain U-19s on 10 February. Kelly went on to make 5 appearances for the Under-19s with his last coming in a 2–1 win over Scotland U-19s on 1 June 2009.

=== England under-20 ===
In August 2009, Kelly was called up to the England under-20 team for the match against Serbia and made his debut in the 5–0 victory. He subsequently played all three matches for the team in the Under-20 World Cup finals in Egypt that year. Kelly made his debut for the England under-20 team in a 5–0 win over Montenegro U-20s in a pre 2009 FIFA U-20 World Cup friendly. He also played at the 2009 FIFA U-20 World Cup in Egypt as England finished bottom of Group D. Kelly made four appearances for the under-20 team.

=== England under-21 ===
On 5 August 2010, Kelly receive.his first call-up to the England Under-21 squad, along with Aston Villa's Marc Albrighton and future club teammate Jordan Henderson. On 10 August 2010 he made his debut, coming on as a substitute and scoring England's second goal as they beat Uzbekistan at Ashton Gate. He scored again for England as they beat Iceland 5–0 on 11 November 2011. He scored his third under-21 goal in only his fifth appearance on 14 November away to Belgium.

=== Senior team ===
On 22 May 2012, Kelly received his first call-up to the senior England team, to face Norway four days later in an international friendly. He was called up by manager Roy Hodgson despite not making his UEFA Euro 2012 squad. He made his debut as a substitute in the 87th minute, replacing Phil Jones at right back. Having played two minutes and thirty-nine seconds, Kelly's international career is the shortest ever for an England player. While Nathaniel Chalobah came on in added time on his 2018 England debut and officially has zero minutes to his career, he played for one second more than Kelly when added time is included.

On 3 June, Kelly was called up to the Euro 2012 squad to replace Gary Cahill, who had fractured his jaw during a 1–0 friendly win against Belgium. He suffered from a virus during the tournament in Ukraine and Poland. He was not used during the championship, in which England reached the quarter-finals.

== Personal life ==
Kelly was in Paris on 13 November 2015, a night when it was hit by a series of terror attacks. After seeing his Instagram post of a restaurant believed to have been attacked, members of the public became concerned for his safety. Crystal Palace confirmed via Twitter that he was safe and well, having returned to his hotel before the attacks began.

== Career statistics ==
=== Club ===
As of match played 6 February 2023

Appearances and goals by club, season and competition
Club	Season	League			FA Cup		League Cup		Europe		Total	
Club	Season	Division	Apps	Goals	Apps	Goals	Apps	Goals	Apps	Goals	Apps	Goals
Liverpool	2008–09	Premier League	0	0	0	0	0	0	1 (Note: Appearance in UEFA Champions League)	0	1	0
Liverpool	2009–10	Premier League	1	0	0	0	0	0	2 (Note: One appearance in UEFA Champions League, one in UEFA Europa League)	0	3	0
Liverpool	2010–11	Premier League	11	0	1	0	1	0	10 (Note: Appearances in UEFA Europa League)	0	23	0
Liverpool	2011–12	Premier League	12	0	3	0	5	1	—		20	1
Liverpool	2012–13	Premier League	4	0	0	0	0	0	3	0	7	0
Liverpool	2013–14	Premier League	5	0	2	0	1	0	—		8	0
Liverpool	Total		33	0	6	0	7	1	16	0	62	1
Huddersfield Town (loan)	2008–09	League One	7	1	—		—		—		7	1
Crystal Palace	2014–15	Premier League	31	0	3	0	0	0	—		34	0
Crystal Palace	2015–16	Premier League	13	0	1	1	3	0	—		17	1
Crystal Palace	2016–17	Premier League	29	0	3	0	2	0	—		34	0
Crystal Palace	2017–18	Premier League	15	0	1	0	3	0	—		19	0
Crystal Palace	2018–19	Premier League	13	0	4	0	3	0	—		20	0
Crystal Palace	2019–20	Premier League	19	0	1	0	1	0	—		21	0
Crystal Palace	2020–21	Premier League	1	0	0	0	1	0	—		2	0
Crystal Palace	2021–22	Premier League	0	0	1	0	0	0	—		1	0
Crystal Palace	Total		121	0	14	1	13	0	—		148	1
West Bromwich Albion	2022–23	Championship	5	0	2	0	0	0	—		7	0
Wigan Athletic (loan)	2022–23	Championship	1	0	—		—		—		1	0
Career total			167	1	22	1	20	1	16	0	225	3

=== International ===
As of match played 26 May 2012

Appearances and goals by national team and year
National team	Year	Apps	Goals
England	2012	1	0
Total		1	0

== Honours ==
Liverpool

- Football League Cup: 2011–12
- FA Cup runner-up: 2011–12

Crystal Palace

- FA Cup runner-up: 2015–16

Individual

- Liverpool Young Player of the Year: 2010–11
- Liverpool Player of the Month Award: February 2011
