= 2018–19 Budapest Honvéd FC season =

Budapest Honvéd FC
2018–19 season
- Chairman: George Hemingway
- Manager: Attila Supka
- NB 1: 4th
- Magyar Kupa: Runners-up
- UEFA Europa League: Second qualifying round
- Top goalscorer: League: Filip Holender (16); All: Filip Holender (21)
- Highest home attendance: 3,579 vs Ferencváros (15 September 2018)
- Lowest home attendance: 520 vs MTK Budapest (23 February 2019)
Home colours	Away colours	Third colours

The 2017–18 season was Budapest Honvéd FC's 108th competitive season, 14th consecutive season in the OTP Bank Liga and 109th year in existence as a football club.

== First team squad ==
Note: Flags indicate national team as defined under FIFA eligibility rules; some limited exceptions apply. Players may hold more than one non-FIFA nationality.

No.	Pos.	Nation	Player
3	DF	NGR	Eke Uzoma
6	MF	HUN	Dániel Gazdag
7	DF	HUN	Bence Batik
8	MF	HUN	Gergő Holdampf
9	MF	HUN	Krisztián Vadócz
11	MF	HUN	Filip Holender
13	DF	HUN	Tibor Heffler
14	DF	HUN	Nikolasz Kovács
16	MF	HUN	Zsolt Pölöskei
18	GK	HUN	András Horváth
19	FW	BRA	Danilo
20	FW	HUN	Dominik Cipf
21	MF	GUI	Fousseni Bamba
22	FW	HUN	Milán Májer

No.	Pos.	Nation	Player
23	MF	HUN	Bence Banó-Szabó
24	MF	BIH	Đorđe Kamber
25	DF	CRO	Ivan Lovrić
26	DF	CRO	Dino Škvorc
33	DF	CRO	Tonći Kukoč
36	DF	HUN	Botond Baráth
55	MF	HUN	Norbert Szendrei
60	DF	HUN	Attila Temesvári
66	GK	HUN	Attila Berla
77	MF	HUN	Gergő Nagy
96	FW	HUN	Dániel Lukács
98	FW	HUN	Bálint Tömösvári
99	GK	HUN	Dávid Gróf

== Transfers ==
=== Summer ===
In: Note: Flags indicate national team as defined under FIFA eligibility rules; some limited exceptions apply. Players may hold more than one non-FIFA nationality.

No.	Pos.	Nation	Player
3	DF	NGR	Eke Uzoma (from Balmazújváros)
7	DF	HUN	Bence Batik (from Ferencváros)
8	MF	HUN	Gergő Holdampf (from Nyíregyháza)
9	MF	HUN	Krisztián Vadócz (from (Hong Kong) Kitchee)
14	DF	HUN	Nikolasz Kovács (from Honvéd U-19)
17	MF	CZE	Tomáš Pilík (from (Czech Republic) Zbrojovka Brno)
20	FW	HUN	Dominik Cipf (from Honvéd U-19)
21	MF	GUI	Fousseni Bamba (from (Ukraine) Chornomorets Odesa)
26	DF	CRO	Dino Škvorc (from (Armenia) Alashkert)
29	FW	HUN	Patrik Tischler (loan from Újpest)
55	MF	HUN	Norbert Szendrei (from Honvéd U-19)
60	DF	HUN	Attila Temesvári (from Honvéd U-19)
89	FW	FRA	David Ngog (from (Scotland) Ross County)
—	MF	HUN	Dániel Kovács (loan return from Dorog)
—	DF	ROU	Raul Palmes (loan return from Kazincbarcika)
—	MF	HUN	Dániel Göblyös (loan return from Dorog)

Out: Note: Flags indicate national team as defined under FIFA eligibility rules; some limited exceptions apply. Players may hold more than one non-FIFA nationality.

No.	Pos.	Nation	Player
2	DF	HUN	Dávid Bobál (to (Czech Republic) Dukla Prague)
7	FW	ITA	Davide Lanzafame (to Ferencváros)
8	DF	NGR	George Ikenne (to MTK Budapest)
9	FW	HUN	Márton Eppel (to (Kazakhstan) Kairat)
9	MF	HUN	Krisztián Vadócz
11	FW	COD	Kadima Kabangu (to (Armenia) Shirak)
61	DF	SVK	Tomáš Košút
92	FW	HUN	Kristóf Herjeczki (loan to Gyirmót)
93	MF	HUN	Dávid Stoiacovici (loan to Tiszakécske)
96	FW	HUN	Dániel Lukács (loan to Újpest)
98	FW	HUN	Bálint Tömösvári (loan to Kaposvár)
—	DF	ROU	Raul Palmes (loan to Kazincbarcika)
—	MF	HUN	Dániel Kovács (to ESMTK)
—	MF	HUN	Dániel Göblyös

=== Winter ===
In: Note: Flags indicate national team as defined under FIFA eligibility rules; some limited exceptions apply. Players may hold more than one non-FIFA nationality.

No.	Pos.	Nation	Player
2	DF	ALG	Mohamed Mezghrani (from (Algeria) USM Alger)
17	MF	TUN	Änis Ben-Hatira (from (Turkey) Gaziantepspor)
48	MF	GEO	Zakaria Beglarishvili (loan from (Estonia) Flora Tallinn)

Out: Note: Flags indicate national team as defined under FIFA eligibility rules; some limited exceptions apply. Players may hold more than one non-FIFA nationality.

No.	Pos.	Nation	Player
8	MF	HUN	Gergő Holdampf (to Haladás)
14	MF	HUN	Nikolasz Kovács (loan to Balmazújváros)
15	DF	SRB	Stefan Deák (to (Serbia) Napredak)
17	MF	CZE	Tomáš Pilík
28	MF	HUN	Patrik Hidi (to (Kazakhstan) Irtysh Pavlodar)
36	DF	HUN	Botond Baráth (to (United States) Kansas City)

== Statistics ==
=== Appearances and goals ===
Last updated on 25 May 2019.

No.	Pos	Nat	Player	Total		OTP Bank Liga		Europa League		Hungarian Cup	
No.	Pos	Nat	Player	Apps	Goals	Apps	Goals	Apps	Goals	Apps	Goals
2	DF	(Algeria) ALG	Mohamed Mezghrani	15	0	11	0	0	0	4	0
3	DF	(Nigeria) NGR	Eke Uzoma	22	1	13	1	4	0	5	0
4	DF	(Hungary) HUN	Dávid Kálnoki-Kis	13	1	8	0	0	0	5	1
6	MF	(Hungary) HUN	Dániel Gazdag	35	1	26	1	3	0	6	0
7	DF	(Hungary) HUN	Bence Batik	37	1	28	1	4	0	5	0
11	MF	(Hungary) HUN	Filip Holender	42	21	33	16	4	2	5	3
13	DF	(Hungary) HUN	Tibor Heffler	39	0	31	0	3	0	5	0
16	MF	(Hungary) HUN	Zsolt Pölöskei	2	0	1	0	1	0	0	0
17	MF	(Tunisia) TUN	Änis Ben-Hatira	17	5	12	3	0	0	5	2
18	FW	(Hungary) HUN	András Horváth	9	-5	0	0	0	0	9	-5
19	FW	(Brazil) BRA	Danilo	37	13	28	9	3	2	6	2
20	FW	(Hungary) HUN	Dominik Cipf	5	0	2	0	1	0	2	0
21	MF	(Guinea) GUI	Fousseni Bamba	14	0	8	0	1	0	5	0
22	FW	(Hungary) HUN	Milán Májer	19	1	10	0	1	0	8	1
23	MF	(Hungary) HUN	Bence Banó-Szabó	22	1	15	0	1	0	6	1
24	MF	(Bosnia and Herzegovina) BIH	Đorđe Kamber	40	4	30	3	4	0	6	1
25	DF	(Croatia) CRO	Ivan Lovrić	20	4	11	2	0	0	9	2
26	DF	(Croatia) CRO	Dino Škvorc	21	0	12	0	4	0	5	0
29	FW	(Hungary) HUN	Patrik Tischler	28	5	20	1	0	0	8	4
33	DF	(Croatia) CRO	Tonći Kukoč	33	0	24	0	3	0	6	0
55	MF	(Hungary) HUN	Norbert Szendrei	8	0	6	0	0	0	2	0
77	MF	(Hungary) HUN	Gergő Nagy	36	1	25	0	4	1	7	0
89	FW	(France) FRA	David Ngog	31	12	23	6	0	0	8	6
99	GK	(Hungary) HUN	Dávid Gróf	38	-44	33	-38	4	-4	1	-2
Youth players:
60	DF	(Hungary) HUN	Attila Temesvári	2	0	0	0	0	0	2	0
Out to loan:
14	DF	(Hungary) HUN	Nikolasz Kovács	4	0	0	0	1	0	3	0
96	FW	(Hungary) HUN	Dániel Lukács	9	2	5	2	4	0	0	0
Players no longer at the club:
5	MF	(Hungary) HUN	Patrik Hidi	11	2	10	0	0	0	1	2
8	MF	(Hungary) HUN	Gergő Holdampf	4	0	2	0	0	0	2	0
9	MF	(Hungary) HUN	Krisztián Vadócz	10	0	6	0	4	0	0	0
17	MF	(Czech Republic) CZE	Tomáš Pilík	12	0	9	0	0	0	3	0
36	DF	(Hungary) HUN	Botond Baráth	18	1	16	0	2	1	0	0

=== Top scorers ===
Includes all competitive matches. The list is sorted by shirt number when total goals are equal.

Last updated on 25 May 2019

Position	Nation	Number	Name	OTP Bank Liga	Europa League	Hungarian Cup	Total
1	(Hungary)	11	Filip Holender	16	2	3	21
2	(Brazil)	19	Danilo	9	2	2	13
3	(France)	89	David Ngog	6	0	6	12
4	(Tunisia)	17	Änis Ben-Hatira	3	0	2	5
5	(Hungary)	29	Patrik Tischler	1	0	4	5
6	(Bosnia and Herzegovina)	24	Đorđe Kamber	3	0	1	4
7	(Croatia)	25	Ivan Lovrić	2	0	2	4
8	(Hungary)	96	Dániel Lukács	2	0	0	2
9	(Hungary)	5	Patrik Hidi	0	0	2	2
10	(Hungary)	77	Gergő Nagy	0	1	0	1
11	(Hungary)	36	Botond Baráth	0	1	0	1
12	(Hungary)	6	Dániel Gazdag	1	0	0	1
13	(Hungary)	7	Bence Batik	1	0	0	1
14	(Nigeria)	3	Eke Uzoma	1	0	0	1
15	(Hungary)	23	Bence Banó-Szabó	0	0	1	1
16	(Hungary)	22	Milán Májer	0	0	1	1
17	(Hungary)	4	Dávid Kálnoki-Kis	0	0	1	1
/	/	/	Own Goals	1	0	0	1
			TOTALS	46	6	25	77

=== Disciplinary record ===
Includes all competitive matches. Players with 1 card or more included only.

Last updated on 25 May 2019

Position	Nation	Number	Name	OTP Bank Liga		Europa League		Hungarian Cup		Total (Hu Total)	
Position	Nation	Number	Name	Yellow card	Red card	Yellow card	Red card	Yellow card	Red card	Yellow card	Red card
DF	(Algeria)	2	Mohamed Mezghrani	3	0	0	0	1	0	4 (3)	0 (0)
DF	(Nigeria)	3	Eke Uzoma	4	0	1	0	0	0	5 (4)	0 (0)
DF	(Hungary)	4	Dávid Kálnoki-Kis	3	0	0	0	0	0	3 (3)	0 (0)
MF	(Hungary)	6	Dániel Gazdag	7	0	0	0	0	0	7 (7)	0 (0)
DF	(Hungary)	7	Bence Batik	5	2	3	0	2	0	10 (6)	2 (2)
MF	(Hungary)	8	Gergő Holdampf	0	0	0	0	1	0	1 (0)	0 (0)
MF	(Hungary)	9	Krisztián Vadócz	0	0	1	0	0	0	1 (0)	0 (0)
MF	(Hungary)	11	Filip Holender	5	0	2	0	2	0	9 (5)	0 (0)
DF	(Hungary)	13	Tibor Heffler	4	0	0	0	0	0	4 (4)	0 (0)
FW	(Tunisia)	17	Änis Ben-Hatira	1	0	0	0	0	0	1 (1)	0 (0)
FW	(Brazil)	19	Danilo	7	0	0	0	1	0	8 (7)	0 (0)
MF	(Guinea)	21	Fousseni Bamba	2	0	0	0	2	0	4 (2)	0 (0)
FW	(Hungary)	22	Milán Májer	0	0	0	0	1	0	1 (0)	0 (0)
MF	(Hungary)	23	Bence Banó-Szabó	0	0	0	0	1	0	1 (0)	0 (0)
MF	(Bosnia and Herzegovina)	24	Đorđe Kamber	5	0	1	0	0	0	6 (5)	0 (0)
DF	(Croatia)	25	Ivan Lovrić	3	0	0	0	1	0	4 (3)	0 (0)
DF	(Croatia)	26	Dino Škvorc	1	1	0	0	0	0	1 (1)	1 (1)
DF	(Croatia)	33	Tonći Kukoč	9	0	0	0	3	0	12 (9)	0 (0)
DF	(Hungary)	36	Botond Baráth	5	0	0	0	0	0	5 (5)	0 (0)
MF	(Hungary)	55	Norbert Szendrei	0	0	0	0	1	0	1 (0)	0 (0)
DF	(Hungary)	60	Attila Temesvári	0	0	0	0	1	0	1 (0)	0 (0)
MF	(Hungary)	77	Gergő Nagy	3	1	0	0	3	0	6 (3)	1 (1)
FW	(France)	89	David Ngog	1	0	0	0	1	0	2 (1)	0 (0)
FW	(Hungary)	96	Dániel Lukács	2	0	0	0	0	0	2 (2)	0 (0)
GK	(Hungary)	99	Dávid Gróf	1	0	0	0	1	0	2 (1)	0 (0)
			TOTALS	71	4	8	0	22	0	101 (71)	4 (4)

=== Overall ===
Games played	47 (33 OTP Bank Liga, 4 Europa League and 10 Hungarian Cup)
Games won	23 (13 OTP Bank Liga, 2 Europa League and 8 Hungarian Cup)
Games drawn	11 (10 OTP Bank Liga, 0 Europa League and 1 Hungarian Cup)
Games lost	13 (10 OTP Bank Liga, 2 Europa League and 1 Hungarian Cup)
Goals scored	77
Goals conceded	49
Goal difference	+28
Yellow cards	101
Red cards	4
Worst discipline	(Hungary) Bence Batik (10 (yellow card) , 2 (red card) )
Best result	0–3 (H) v MOL Vidi (Nemzeti Bajnokság I) - 18–08–2018
Worst result	6–0 (H) v Bőny (Magyar Kupa) - 23–08–2018
Most appearances	(Hungary) Filip Holender (42 appearances)
Top scorer	(Hungary) Filip Holender (21 goals)
Points	83/141 (58.86%)

Last updated: 25 May 2019

== Nemzeti Bajnokság I ==
=== Matches ===
21 July 2018 1	Budapest Honvéd	3 – 2	Szombathelyi Haladás	Budapest, Pest County
20:15 CEST	Danilo 42'; Kamber 67'; Lukács 76'	Report	Priskin 50'; Bamgboye 80'	Stadium: Bozsik József Stadion; Attendance: 1,670; Referee: (Hungary) Balázs Berke

29 July 2018 2	Budapest Honvéd	4 – 0	Kisvárda	Budapest, Pest County
18:00 CEST	Danilo 24' (pen.); Jánvári 72' (o.g.); Gazdag 85'; Lukács 90+1'	Report		Stadium: Bozsik József Stadion; Attendance: 1,774; Referee: (Hungary) Ádám Farkas

5 August 2018 3	Budapest Honvéd	1 – 0	Paks	Budapest, Pest County
18:00 CEST	Danilo 49' (pen.)	Report		Stadium: Bozsik József Stadion; Attendance: 1,740; Referee: (Hungary) Viktor Kassai

12 August 2018 4	Mezőkövesd	0 – 1	Budapest Honvéd	Mezőkövesd, Borsod-Abaúj-Zemplén County
19:00 CEST		Report	Holender 51'	Stadium: Mezőkövesdi Városi Stadion; Attendance: 3,248; Referee: (Hungary) József Erdős

18 August 2018 5	Budapest Honvéd	0 – 3	MOL Vidi	Budapest, Pest County
19:30 CEST		Report	Kovács 26'; Huszti 39'; Hadžić 51'	Stadium: Hidegkuti Nándor Stadion; Attendance: 2,007; Referee: (Hungary) Ádám Farkas

25 August 2018 6	Budapest Honvéd	3 – 0	Debrecen	Budapest, Pest County
17:00 CEST	Danilo 22', 79' (pen.); Ngog 87'	Report		Stadium: Hidegkuti Nándor Stadion; Attendance: 1,765; Referee: (Hungary) Tamás Bognár

1 September 2018 7	Újpest	0 – 0	Budapest Honvéd	Budapest, Pest County
19:30 CEST		Report		Stadium: Szusza Ferenc Stadion; Attendance: 3,561; Referee: (Hungary) Zoltán Iványi

15 September 2018 8	Budapest Honvéd	0 – 1	Ferencváros	Budapest, Pest County
19:30 CEST		Report	Petryak 16'	Stadium: Hidegkuti Nándor Stadion; Attendance: 3,579; Referee: (Hungary) József Erdős

29 September 2018 9	Puskás Akadémia	1 – 0	Budapest Honvéd	Felcsút, Fejér County
17:00 CEST	Knežević 17'	Report		Stadium: Pancho Arena; Attendance: 1,200; Referee: (Hungary) Balázs Berke

6 October 2018 10	Budapest Honvéd	1 – 0	Diósgyőr	Budapest, Pest County
14:45 CEST	Holender 67'	Report		Stadium: Hidegkuti Nándor Stadion; Attendance: 2,069; Referee: (Hungary) Gergely Szőts

20 October 2018 11	MTK Budapest	1 – 1	Budapest Honvéd	Budapest, Pest County
17:00 CEST	Bognár 84'	Report	Batik 36'	Stadium: Hidegkuti Nándor Stadion; Attendance: 3,314; Referee: (Hungary) Csaba Pintér

27 October 2018 12	Szombathelyi Haladás	0 – 1	Budapest Honvéd	Szombathely, Vas County
17:00 CEST		Report	Danilo 89'	Stadium: Haladás Sportkomplexum; Attendance: 3,176; Referee: (Hungary) Viktor Kassai

3 November 2018 13	Kisvárda	0 – 3	Budapest Honvéd	Kisvárda, Szabolcs-Szatmár-Bereg County
17:00 CET		Report	Holender 32', 69'; Ngog 78'	Stadium: Várkert Sportpálya; Attendance: 2,685; Referee: (Hungary) Péter Solymosi

10 November 2018 14	Paks	0 – 0	Budapest Honvéd	Paks, Tolna County
17:00 CET		Report		Stadium: Fehérvári úti Stadion; Attendance: 1,283; Referee: (Hungary) Gergely Szőts

24 November 2018 15	Budapest Honvéd	1 – 1	Mezőkövesd	Budapest, Pest County
17:00 CET	Holender 64'	Report	Dražić 76'	Stadium: Hidegkuti Nándor Stadion; Attendance: 1,556; Referee: (Hungary) Csaba Pintér

2 December 2018 16	MOL Vidi	2 – 0	Budapest Honvéd	Székesfehérvár, Fejér County
18:00 CET	Juhász 18'; Šćepović 63'	Report		Stadium: MOL Aréna Sóstó; Attendance: 4,699; Referee: (Hungary) Viktor Kassai

8 December 2018 17	Debrecen	2 – 0	Budapest Honvéd	Debrecen, Hajdú-Bihar County
17:00 CET	Bódi 44'; Szécsi 81'	Report		Stadium: Nagyerdei Stadion; Attendance: 1,828; Referee: (Hungary) József Erdős

15 December 2018 18	Budapest Honvéd	2 – 2	Újpest	Budapest, Pest County
19:30 CET	Holender 43' (pen.); Tischler 89'	Report	Beridze 47'; Novothny 64'	Stadium: Hidegkuti Nándor Stadion; Attendance: 1,891; Referee: (Hungary) Péter Solymosi

2 February 2019 19	Ferencváros	1 – 0	Budapest Honvéd	Budapest, Pest County
19:30 CET	Böde 83'	Report		Stadium: Groupama Arena; Attendance: 10,027; Referee: (Hungary) Balázs Berke

9 February 2019 20	Budapest Honvéd	2 – 1	Puskás Akadémia	Budapest, Pest County
17:00 CET	Holender 9', 17'	Report	Radó	Stadium: Hidegkuti Nándor Stadion; Attendance: 1,780; Referee: (Hungary) István Vad

16 February 2019 21	Diósgyőr	2 – 1	Budapest Honvéd	Miskolc, Borsod-Abaúj-Zemplén County
17:00 CET	Vernes 62'; Prosser 75'	Report	Danilo 15'	Stadium: DVTK Stadion; Attendance: 5,026; Referee: (Hungary) Ádám Németh

23 February 2019 22	Budapest Honvéd	2 – 1	MTK Budapest	Győr, Győr-Moson-Sopron County
19:30 CET	Holender 44'; Ben-Hatira 58'	Report	Torghelle 52'	Stadium: Ménfői úti Stadion; Attendance: 520; Referee: (Hungary) Gergő Bogár

2 March 2019 23	Budapest Honvéd	1 – 3	Szombathelyi Haladás	Budapest, Pest County
17:00 CET	Holender 54'	Report	Gaál 38'; Holodyuk 77'; Ivanov 89'	Stadium: Hidegkuti Nándor Stadion; Attendance: 1,565; Referee: (Hungary) József Erdős

9 March 2019 24	Kisvárda	1 – 1	Budapest Honvéd	Kisvárda, Szabolcs-Szatmár-Bereg County
17:00 CET	Grozav 28'	Report	Danilo 46'	Stadium: Várkert Sportpálya; Attendance: 2,110; Referee: (Hungary) Péter Solymosi

16 March 2019 25	Budapest Honvéd	3 – 0	Paks	Budapest, Pest County
17:00 CET	Holender 27', 38'; Ngog 55'	Report		Stadium: Hidegkuti Nándor Stadion; Attendance: 1,400; Referee: (Hungary) Csaba Pintér

30 March 2019 26	Mezőkövesd	3 – 1	Budapest Honvéd	Mezőkövesd, Borsod-Abaúj-Zemplén County
19:00 CET	Moutari 71'; Vayda 84'; Dražić 90+2'	Report	Holender 69'	Stadium: Mezőkövesdi Városi Stadion; Attendance: 2,377; Referee: (Hungary) József Erdős

6 April 2019 27	Budapest Honvéd	0 – 1	MOL Vidi	Budapest, Pest County
19:30 CEST		Report	Huszti 89'	Stadium: Hidegkuti Nándor Stadion; Attendance: 2,187; Referee: (Hungary) István Vad

13 April 2019 28	Budapest Honvéd	1 – 1	Debrecen	Budapest, Pest County
17:00 CEST	Holender 5' (pen.)	Report	Csősz 32'	Stadium: Hidegkuti Nándor Stadion; Attendance: 2,128; Referee: (Hungary) Feernc Karakó

20 April 2019 29	Újpest	0 – 0	Budapest Honvéd	Budapest, Pest County
17:00 CEST		Report		Stadium: Szusza Ferenc Stadion; Attendance: 3,884; Referee: (Hungary) Sándor Andó-Szabó

27 April 2019 30	Budapest Honvéd	3 – 2	Ferencváros	Budapest, Pest County
19:30 CEST	Uzoma 36'; Ben-Hatira 62', 76'	Report	Kharatin 54'; Nguen 73'	Stadium: Hidegkuti Nándor Stadion; Attendance: 3,090; Referee: (Hungary) Zoltán Iványi

4 May 2019 31	Puskás Akadémia	2 – 2	Budapest Honvéd	Felcsút, Fejér County
17:00 CEST	Nagy 9'; Knežević 39' (pen.)	Report	Holender 40'; Lovrić 59'	Stadium: Pancho Arena; Attendance: 1,941; Referee: (Hungary) Péter Solymosi

11 May 2019 32	Budapest Honvéd	4 – 4	Diósgyőr	Budapest, Pest County
17:00 CEST	Kamber 19'; Danilo 39'; Ngog 72'; Lovrić 78'	Report	Prosser 42'; Vernes 49', 61', 84'	Stadium: Hidegkuti Nándor Stadion; Attendance: 2,393; Referee: (Hungary) Balázs Berke

19 May 2019 33	MTK Budapest	1 – 4	Budapest Honvéd	Budapest, Pest County
17:00 CEST	Lencse 21'	Report	Holender 20'; Kamber 53'; Ngog 76', 90+1'	Stadium: Hidegkuti Nándor Stadion; Attendance: 3,882; Referee: (Hungary) Sándor Andó-Szabó

=== League table ===
Pos	Team	Pld	W	D	L	GF	GA	GD	Pts	Qualification or relegation
2	Vidi	33	18	7	8	53	37	+16	61	Qualification for the Europa League first qualifying round (Note: Since the winners of the 2018–19 Magyar Kupa, Vidi, qualified for European competition based on league position, the spot awarded to the cup winners (Europa League first qualifying round) was passed to the fourth-placed team.)
3	Debrecen	33	14	9	10	44	39	+5	51	Qualification for the Europa League first qualifying round
4	Honvéd	33	13	10	10	46	38	+8	49	Qualification for the Europa League first qualifying round
5	Újpest	33	12	12	9	38	28	+10	48	
6	Mezőkövesd	33	12	8	13	45	40	+5	44	

Source: Hungarian Football Federation (in Hungarian), Soccerway
Rules for classification: 1) Points; 2) Matches won; 3) Goal difference; 4) Goals scored; 5) Head-to-head points; 6) Head-to-head goal difference; 7) Head-to-head away goals scored; 8) Fair play ranking; 9) Drawing of lots.

=== Results summary ===
Overall								Home						Away					
Pld	W	D	L	GF	GA	GD	Pts	W	D	L	GF	GA	GD	W	D	L	GF	GA	GD
33	13	10	10	46	38	+8	49	9	4	4	31	22	+9	4	6	6	15	16	−1

Last updated: 19 May 2019.
Source: NB1

=== Results by round ===
Round	1	2	3	4	5	6	7	8	9	10	11	12	13	14	15	16	17	18	19	20	21	22	23	24	25	26	27	28	29	30	31	32	33
Ground	H	H	H	A	H	H	A	H	A	H	A	A	A	A	H	A	A	H	A	H	A	H	H	A	H	A	H	H	H	H	A	H	A
Result	W	W	W	W	L	W	D	L	L	W	D	W	W	D	D	L	L	D	L	W	L	W	L	D	W	L	L	D	D	W	D	D	W
Position	5	2	2	2	2	2	2	2	2	2	2	2	2	2	3	3	3	4	4	3	5	4	4	5	5	5	5	5	5	4	4	4	4

Updated to match(es) played on 19 May 2019. Source: Matches
A = Away; H = Home; W = Win; D = Draw; L = Loss

== Hungarian Cup ==
23 September 2018 Round 6	Bőny	0 – 6	Budapest Honvéd	Bőny, Győr-Moson-Sopron County
12:30 CEST		Report	Hidi 6', 8'; Tischler 28', 37'; Lovrić 52'; Kamber 76'	Stadium: Bőny SE Sporttelep; Referee: (Hungary) Ádám Pillók

31 October 2018 Round 7	Jászberény	0 – 1	Budapest Honvéd	Kecskemét, Bács-Kiskun County
18:00 CET		Report	Ngog 5'	Stadium: Széktói Stadion; Attendance: 1,400; Referee: (Hungary) Bence Csonka

5 December 2018 Round of 32	Tiszaújváros	0 – 4	Budapest Honvéd	Tiszaújváros, Borsod-Abaúj-Zemplén County
12:00 CET		Report	Tischler 46'; Lovrić 51'; Banó-Szabó 79'; Májer 89'	Stadium: Tiszaújváros Sportcentrum; Referee: (Hungary) János Takács

20 February 2019 Round of 16 (1st leg)	Tiszakécske	0 – 1	Budapest Honvéd	Tiszakécske, Bács-Kiskun County
14:00 CET		Report	Ben-Hatira 35'	Stadium: Tiszakécske Sportcentrum; Attendance: 800; Referee: (Hungary) János Takács

27 February 2019 Round of 16 (2nd leg)	Budapest Honvéd	1 – 1 (2 – 1 agg.)	Tiszakécske	Budapest, Pest County
18:00 CET	Danilo 30'	Report	Szabó 47'	Stadium: Bozsik József Stadion; Attendance: 1,579; Referee: (Hungary) Szabolcs Szilasi

13 March 2019 Quarter-final (1st leg)	Budaörs	1 – 2	Budapest Honvéd	Tatabánya, Komárom-Esztergom County
14:30 CET	Fejős 22'	Report	Ngog 63', 77'	Stadium: Városi Stadion; Attendance: 100; Referee: (Hungary) Péter G. Kovács

3 April 2019 Quarter-final (2nd leg)	Budapest Honvéd	4 – 2 (6 – 3 agg.)	Budaörs	Budapest, Pest County
18:00 CET	Ngog 3', 43', 50'; Holender 28'	Report	Sajbán 66'; Fejős 88'	Stadium: Hidegkuti Nándor Stadion; Attendance: 1,312; Referee: (Hungary) Gergő Bogár

17 April 2019 Semi-final (1st leg)	Budapest Honvéd	2 – 1	Soroksár	Budapest, Pest County
18:00 CEST	Holender 57'; Kálnoki-Kis 87'	Report	Gyömbér 79'	Stadium: Hidegkuti Nándor Stadion; Attendance: 1,929; Referee: (Hungary) Zoltán Iványi

24 April 2019 Semi-final (2nd leg)	Soroksár	0 – 3 (1 – 5 agg.)	Budapest Honvéd	Budapest, Pest County
15:00 CEST		Report	Ben-Hatira 16' (pen.); Danilo 89'; Tischler 90+1'	Stadium: Szamosi Mihály Sporttelep; Attendance: 1,000; Referee: (Hungary) Csaba Pintér

25 May 2019 Final	Budapest Honvéd	1 – 2	MOL Vidi	Budapest, Pest County
19:30 CEST	Holender 14' (pen.)	Report	Šćepović 79'; Hadžić 90+1'	Stadium: Groupama Aréna; Attendance: 12,777; Referee: (Hungary) Zoltán Iványi

== UEFA Europa League ==
11 July 2018 Q1 Leg 1	Rabotnički (North Macedonia)	2 – 1	Budapest Honvéd	Skopje
17:30 CEST	Petkovski 34'; Sharkoski 60'	Report	Nagy 45+1'	Stadium: Training Centre Petar Miloševski; Attendance: 730; Referee: (Estonia) Kristo Tohver

17 July 2017 Q1 Leg 2	Budapest Honvéd	4 – 0 (5 – 2 agg.)	(North Macedonia) Rabotnički	Budapest
18:00 CEST	Holender 6', 16'; Danilo 63' (pen.), 84'	Report		Stadium: Bozsik József Stadion; Attendance: Match without spectators Referee: (Romania) Marius Avram replaced by (Romania) Iulian Călin (29')

26 July 2017 Q2 Leg 1	Budapest Honvéd	1 – 0	(Luxembourg) Progrès Niederkorn	Budapest
19:00 CEST	Baráth 82'	Report		Stadium: Bozsik József Stadion; Attendance: 2,447; Referee: (Sweden) Mohammed Al-Hakim

2 August 2018 Q2 Leg 2	Progrès Niederkorn (Luxembourg)	2 – 0 (2 – 1 agg.)	Budapest Honvéd	Differdange
19:00 CEST	De Almeida 21'; Matias 84'	Report		Stadium: Stade Municipal; Attendance: 1,852; Referee: (France) Karim Abed
