= 2007–08 RCD Espanyol season =

RCD Espanyol
2007–08 season
- President: Daniel Sánchez Llibre
- Head coach: Ernesto Valverde
- Stadium: Estadi Olímpic Lluís Companys
- La Liga: 12th
- Copa del Rey: Round of 16
- Top goalscorer: League: Luis García (13); All: Luis García (15)

The 2007–08 RCD Espanyol season was the 77th year in the club's history.

== Summary ==
2007–08 was Espanyol's second season under the leadership of Ernesto Valverde, who had led them to the UEFA Cup final in his first season in charge. Despite this success, they did not qualify for European competition in 2007–08, when they would compete domestically in La Liga and the Copa del Rey.

The season began poorly, with a 1–0 home defeat by Real Valladolid at Estadi Olímpic Lluís Companys on 26 August, courtesy of a second-half goal from Joseba Llorente. Things improved after this shaky start, with a 2–2 draw against Real Betis at Manuel Ruiz de Lopera followed by the club's first win of the campaign, a 1–0 home victory over Getafe.

Periquitos lost their next game, against Recreativo de Huelva at Nuevo Colombino on 22 September, with an early goal from Albert Riera cancelled out by Javi Guerrero’s second-half brace for the hosts. However, this was followed by a long unbeaten run, with Blanquiazules securing nine wins and seven draws in their next sixteen games across all competitions. This run included a 2–1 home win over Real Madrid on 20 October, a 1–1 home draw with Barcelona on 1 December, and a 3–2 aggregate victory over Deportivo de La Coruña in the Copa del Rey round of 32. Espanyol's good form left them 3rd in the table in early January, in the running for a UEFA Champions League qualifying spot.

The run finally came to an end on 13 January with a 1–0 loss to Almería at Estadio del Mediterráneo thanks to a late winner from Kalu Uche. Three days later, Periquitos exited the Copa del Rey with a penalty shoot-out loss to Athletic Bilbao, following 1–1 draws in both legs of their round of 16 tie.

In a dramatic reversal of their form, Blanquiazules would win just three games for the rest of the season: 1–0 against Getafe at Coliseum Alfonso Pérez in February, and at home against Valencia and Mallorca in March. Following the Mallorca game, they recorded just three draws and seven losses in their final ten games of the campaign, with a rare highlight being a 0–0 draw against Barcelona at Camp Nou on 19 April. Espanyol's poor form saw them drop to 12th in the table by the end of the season.

On 28 May, Valverde was appointed coach at Super League Greece club Olympiacos on 28 May. In his place, the club appointed Tintín Márquez, who had been assistant manager since 2004, serving under both Valverde and his predecessor Miguel Ángel Lotina.

== Squad statistics ==
Last updated on 20 January 2024.

No.	Pos	Nat	Player	Total		La Liga		Copa del Rey	
No.	Pos	Nat	Player	Apps	Goals	Apps	Goals	Apps	Goals
1	GK	(Cameroon) CMR	Carlos Kameni	30	0	30	0	0	0
2	DF	(Spain) ESP	Javi Chica	20	0	13+5	0	2	0
3	DF	(Spain) ESP	David García	17	0	16	0	1	0
4	DF	(Spain) ESP	Jesús María Lacruz	22	0	13+5	0	4	0
6	DF	(Argentina) ARG	Clemente Rodríguez	19	0	13+4	0	1+1	0
7	MF	(Cape Verde) CPV	Valdo	34	4	27+4	4	3	0
8	MF	(Argentina) ARG	Pablo Zabaleta	36	1	31+1	1	4	0
9	MF	(Spain) ESP	Iván de la Peña	15	0	7+5	0	1+2	0
10	MF	(Spain) ESP	Luis García	41	15	36+1	13	4	2
11	MF	(Spain) ESP	Albert Riera	39	4	30+6	4	3	0
12	GK	(Spain) ESP	Kiko Casilla	4	0	3+1	0	0	0
12	DF	(Spain) ESP	Albert Serrán	2	0	1	0	1	0
13	GK	(Spain) ESP	Javi Ruiz	0	0	0	0	0	0
13	GK	(Spain) ESP	Iñaki Lafuente	9	0	5	0	4	0
14	MF	(Spain) ESP	Ángel	30	2	21+7	2	2	0
15	MF	(Brazil) BRA	Fredson	0	0	0	0	0	0
15	FW	(Brazil) BRA	Ewerthon	8	1	5+3	1	0	0
17	MF	(Morocco) MAR	Moha El Yaagoubi	11	0	3+6	0	1+1	0
18	MF	(Spain) ESP	Francisco Rufete	11	0	5+5	0	1	0
19	DF	(Spain) ESP	Marc Torrejón	39	1	36	1	2+1	0
20	FW	(Spain) ESP	Coro	28	3	13+13	2	1+1	1
21	DF	(Spain) ESP	Daniel Jarque	32	1	30+1	1	1	0
22	MF	(Spain) ESP	Moisés Hurtado	37	0	32+2	0	1+2	0
23	FW	(Spain) ESP	Raúl Tamudo	29	11	22+3	10	0+4	1
24	FW	(Spain) ESP	Jonathan Soriano	27	3	8+16	2	3	1
25	MF	(Serbia) SRB	Milan Smiljanić	34	0	16+14	0	4	0
31	MF	(Spain) ESP	Jordi Gómez	3	0	0+3	0	0	0
33	MF	(Spain) ESP	Miguel Palanca	0	0	0	0	0	0
Players who have left the club after the start of the season:
	MF	(Brazil) BRA	Jônatas	9	0	2+7	0	0	0
