= Albert Riera =

Spanish football manager (born 1982)

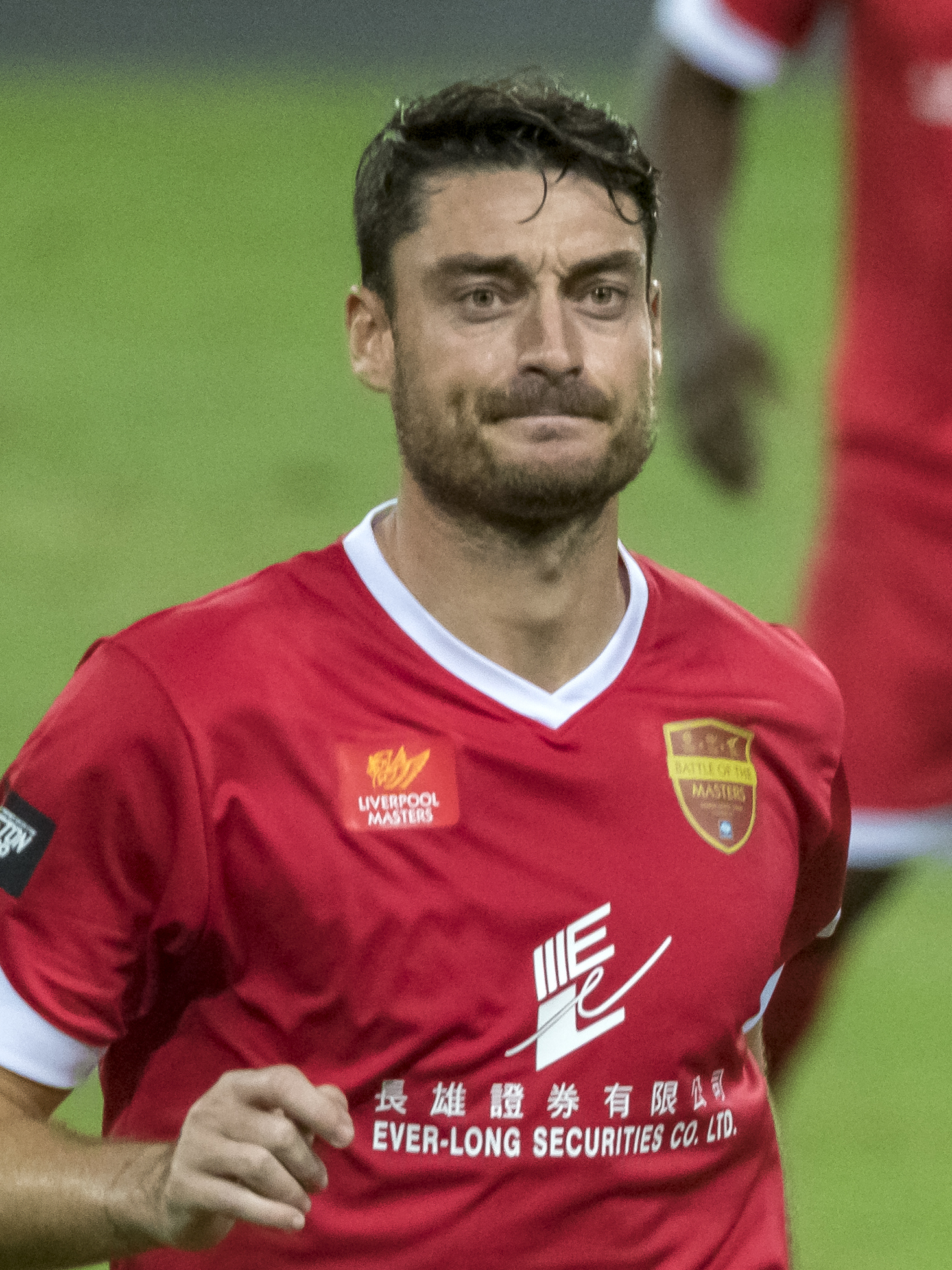
- Riera in 2017

Personal information
- Full name: Albert Riera Ortega
- Date of birth: 15 April 1982 (age 44)
- Place of birth: Manacor, Spain
- Height: 1.87 m (6 ft 2 in)
- Positions: Winger; left-back

Team information
- Current team: Red Star Belgrade (manager)

Youth career
- 1999–2000: Mallorca

Senior career*
Years	Team	Apps	(Gls)
2000–2002	Mallorca B	54	(12)
2001–2003	Mallorca	46	(6)
2003–2005	Bordeaux	53	(4)
2005–2008	Espanyol	72	(8)
2006	→ Manchester City (loan)	15	(1)
2008–2010	Liverpool	40	(3)
2010–2011	Olympiacos	26	(6)
2011–2014	Galatasaray	60	(3)
2014	Watford	8	(1)
2014	Udinese	0	(0)
2015	Mallorca	6	(0)
2015	Zavrč	12	(1)
2016	Koper	1	(0)
Total		393	(45)

International career
2000–2001	Spain U18	11	(0)
2002–2003	Spain U21	15	(2)
2007–2009	Spain	16	(4)

Managerial career
- 2020–2022: Galatasaray (assistant)
- 2022–2023: Olimpija Ljubljana
- 2023: Celje
- 2023–2024: Bordeaux
- 2024–2026: Celje
- 2026: Eintracht Frankfurt
- 2026–: Red Star Belgrade
- * Club domestic league appearances and goals

Albert Riera Ortega (born 15 April 1982) is a Spanish professional football manager and former player who is the head coach of Serbian SuperLiga club Red Star Belgrade.

Earlier a left winger and later also a left-back, he made a name for himself at Espanyol (with whom he won a Copa del Rey and reached the 2007 UEFA Cup final) and also played in France, England, Greece, Turkey, Italy and Slovenia, notably spending three years with Galatasaray. He won 16 caps for Spain, representing the nation at the 2009 Confederations Cup.

Riera began managing in 2022, leading Olimpija Ljubljana to the Slovenian PrvaLiga and Slovenian Football Cup titles for a double in his first season. He had two spells at Celje in the same country, also being in charge of Bordeaux in Ligue 2, Bundesliga club Eintracht Frankfurt and Red Star Belgrade of the Serbian SuperLiga.

== Club career ==
=== Mallorca ===
Born in Manacor, Balearic Islands, Riera started his professional career with hometown club Mallorca. He made his first-team debut on 25 February 2001 under Luis Aragonés in La Liga, as a 71st-minute substitute for Lluís Carreras in a 2–1 loss at Racing Santander, and scored his first goal on 27 May by coming off the bench to conclude a 4–0 home win over Rayo Vallecano that secured a UEFA Champions League place. He totalled 17 games and three goals in his first two seasons.

In the 2002–03 campaign, already an undisputed starter, Riera helped the local team to the conquest of the Copa del Rey, and scored four league goals in 35 games.

=== Bordeaux ===
In the summer of 2003, Riera moved to Bordeaux. He made 66 competitive appearances for the Ligue 1 side over a two-year spell, netting nine times; this included five in a run to the quarter-finals of the UEFA Cup in his first season before elimination by eventual winners Valencia.

=== Espanyol ===
Riera returned to Spain in 2005, when he signed for Espanyol. He played just eight league matches in his first season, prompting a January 2006 loan move to Manchester City where he was also unable to establish himself, scoring his only goal against Newcastle United in a 3–0 home win on 1 February.

Riera returned to Catalonia prior to 2006–07. Espanyol went on to reach the UEFA Cup final at Hampden Park in Glasgow, where they played fellow Spaniards Sevilla; he scored to level the game at 1–1, but his team eventually lost 3–1 on penalties. At the end of the campaign, he extended his contract until 2011.

=== Liverpool ===
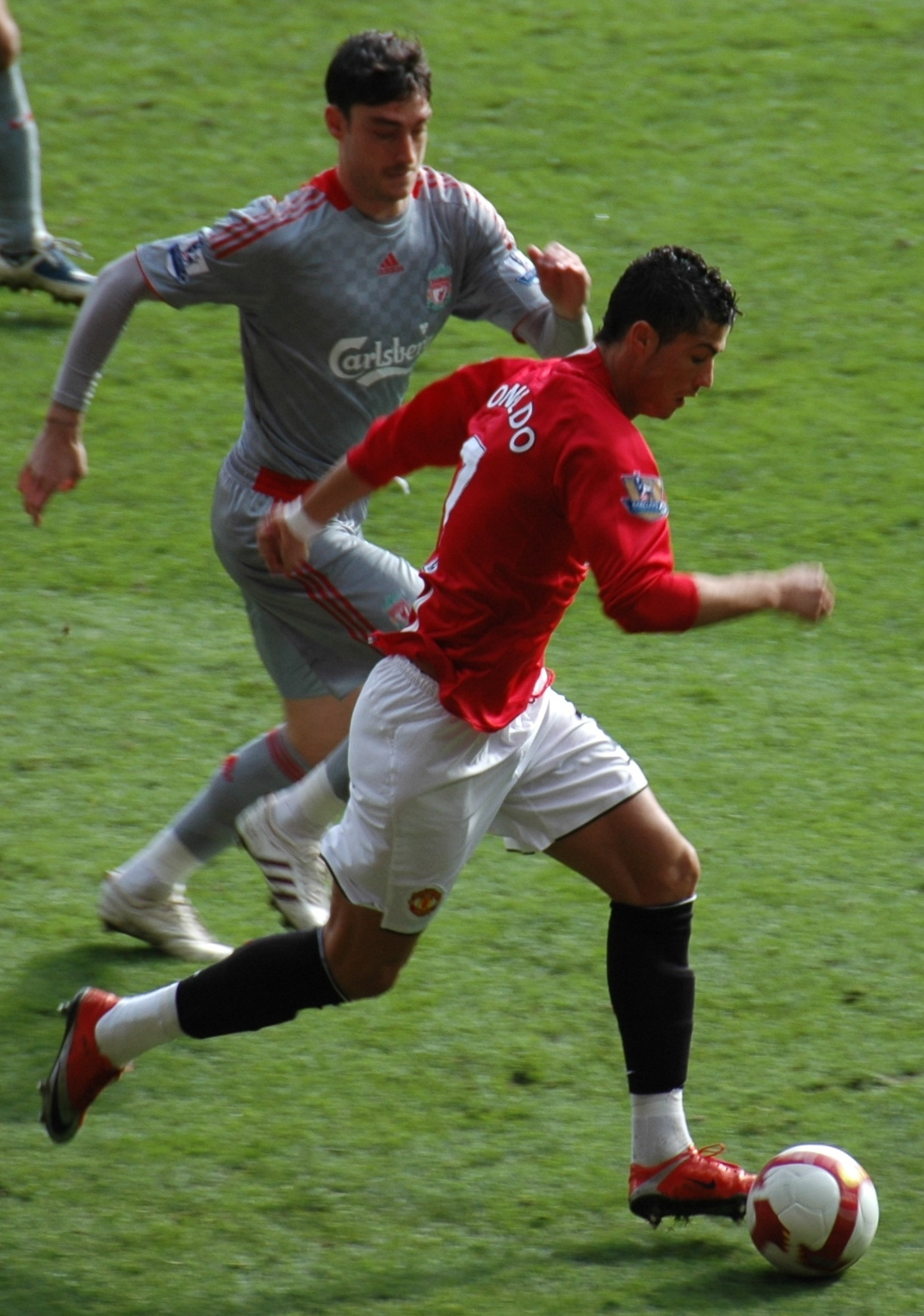
Riera (left) playing for Liverpool in 2009

On 1 September 2008 (transfer deadline day), Riera signed a four-year deal with Liverpool for a fee of £8 million, being given the number 11 shirt. He made his Premier League debut on the 13th, playing 71 minutes of a 2–1 home win against Manchester United, and scored his first goal for the Reds as they beat Wigan Athletic 3–2 on 18 October, adding another in the 3–1 victory at PSV Eindhoven in the group stage of the Champions League.

Riera netted Liverpool's first goal of 2009, and also scored in the third round in the FA Cup on 3 January, against Preston North End. Later that season, he scored against Aston Villa in a 5–0 home rout on 22 March 2009, through a half-volley after Pepe Reina's long goal kick.

On 18 March 2010, Riera was suspended after comments made to the Spanish press regarding his first team opportunities and the approach of manager Rafael Benítez. The player was quoted as saying: "He's never sorted out a situation with a player by talking with him." He was transfer listed following the comments, with Russian clubs CSKA Moscow and Spartak Moscow thought to be interested in a permanent move. On the 23rd of that month it was announced that Liverpool had accepted a £6 million bid from CSKA for the player; however, it appeared to be solely rumours, any interest was officially denied– additionally, the player's agent, Ángel Castells, confirmed that only Spartak had made a proposal.

=== Olympiacos ===
On 23 July 2010, Riera joined Olympiacos on a four-year contract. The deal was reported to be worth around €6 million (€4 million plus another potential €2 million in bonuses), with a salary of around €2.5 million per season; he became one of the most expensive transfers in the country's history, as he reunited with former Espanyol manager Ernesto Valverde.

Riera scored his first goal against Kerkyra in a 2–0 home win, and appeared in 28 competitive matches during the season as the Piraeus team won the Super League Greece.

=== Galatasaray ===
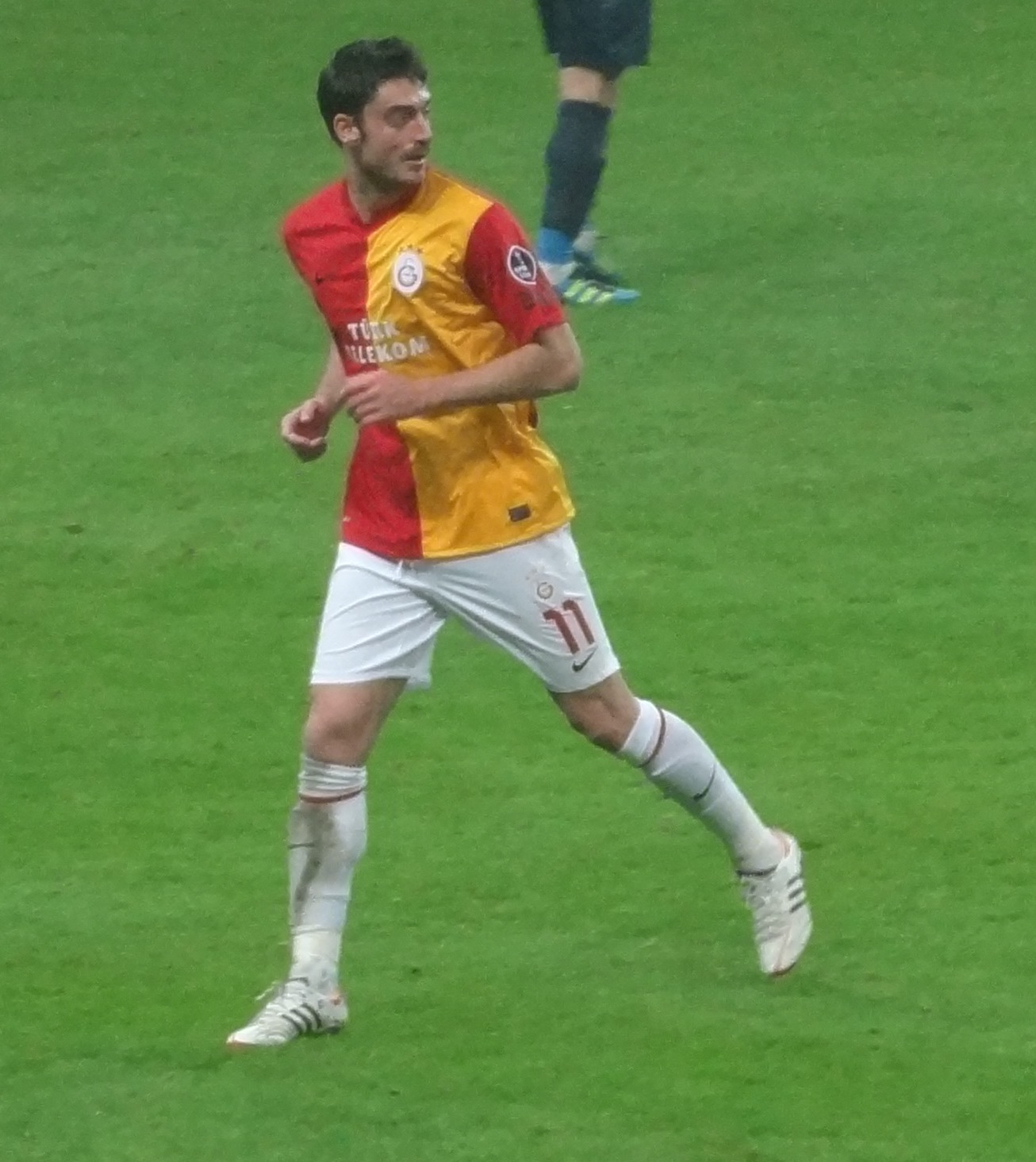
Riera with Galatasaray in 2012

On 3 September 2011, Riera completed a €3 million move to Turkish side Galatasaray, signing a four-year deal. He scored his first goal in the Süper Lig on 25 January 2012 in a 4–0 home defeat of Ankaragücü, and was an habitual first-choice in his first season as the Istanbul-based team won the national championship; he was also involved, however, in a punching session with teammate Felipe Melo just before the playoffs started.

Following the arrival of prospect Nordin Amrabat for the 2012–13 campaign, Riera was reconverted by manager Fatih Terim into an attacking left-back, mainly due to the lack of options in the position other than injury-prone Hakan Balta. On 28 January 2014, he agreed to have his contract terminated for €750,000 and left the Ali Sami Yen Stadium.

=== Watford ===
On 24 March 2014, Riera signed a pre-contract with Italian side Udinese, effective as of 1 July. Three days later, he joined Football League Championship's Watford until the end of the season.

Riera scored his first and only goal for Watford on 19 April 2014, in the 3–1 home win over Ipswich Town. He had an extended run until late in the month, when he was sent off for two bookable offences in a 3–1 loss at Charlton Athletic after a high challenge on Diego Poyet. After the match, he was charged by The Football Association for improper conduct, having confronted the officials and having to be dragged away by his team-mates; he was given a two-match ban although only one remained to end the campaign, and he subsequently returned to Udinese.

=== Later career ===
On 29 November 2014, Riera was sacked by Udinese for attending a poker tournament rather than reporting to play against Chievo, also taking to Twitter to insult the organisation. He returned to his first club Mallorca the following 5 March, after agreeing to a one-and-a-half-year deal. In May, he was subjected to disciplinary proceedings after claiming he would not appear again for the team as long as Miquel Soler was the manager.

On 11 September 2015, Slovenian sports newspaper Ekipa reported that Riera would sign a contract with Zavrč. Three days later, he was officially presented.

Riera terminated his contract on 22 January 2016, but remained in the country as he joined Koper until June 2018 shortly after. He joined the team also as an assistant sporting director, and made one brief appearance against Primorje in the first game of the second half of the season; he was then suspended from training and his contract was cancelled unilaterally in July 2016.

== International career ==
On 13 October 2007, Riera made his debut for the Spain national team in the UEFA Euro 2008 qualifying match against Denmark, scoring from outside the box in a 3–1 away victory. However, he was not selected for the tournament, where the country was crowned the champion.

Riera was again called to the squad in October 2008 for two 2010 FIFA World Cup qualifiers after Sevilla's Diego Capel withdrew with an injury, and played twelve minutes in a 3–0 victory against Estonia. On 1 April of the following year, he netted a last-minute winner in Turkey (2–1). Coach Vicente del Bosque named Riera in the squad for the 2009 FIFA Confederations Cup, and he made four appearances for the team that finished third place.

== Coaching career ==
=== Galatasaray (assistant) ===
Riera officially announced his retirement from football on 24 January 2018, through a social media post portraying himself having literally hung up his boots on a tree. He obtained a UEFA Pro Licence in 2019, and in August of the following year he returned to Galatasaray to be an assistant coach to Fatih Terim. In January 2022, he went back to the Nef Stadium to work alongside compatriot Domènec Torrent.

=== Olimpija Ljubljana ===
On 4 July 2022, Riera returned to the Slovenian top tier when he was appointed manager of Olimpija Ljubljana. He was forced out of his first press conference by Olimpija ultras, Green Dragons, unhappy with the dismissal of predecessor Robert Prosinečki. He made his debut three days later at home to Differdange 03 in the first qualifying round of the UEFA Europa Conference League, drawing 1–1, and requiring extra time in the second leg to advance through the tie. His team began the league season on 14 July with a 2–0 home win over Mura, followed by a further seven victories for the club's best start since 1994.

Riera eventually led Olimpija to the national championship, clinching their first title since 2018 after defeating archrivals Maribor 2–0 with five rounds to go. He completed the double after defeating Maribor in the Slovenian Cup with a 130th-minute penalty kick by Timi Max Elšnik. For his achievements, he was named Manager of the Year; however, at the ceremony, he announced that he had not been offered a new deal and would leave after his contract expired at the end of May.

=== Celje ===
On 20 July 2023, two days before the start of the new season, Riera was officially unveiled as manager of Celje also in the Slovenian top tier. On his debut three days later, his team drew 2–2 at Aluminij. He left the club, with the team at the top of the table after 11 rounds, on 11 October. He managed the team for 17 matches, notably knocking out Portugal's Vitória de Guimarães in the second qualifying round of the UEFA Europa Conference League.

=== Bordeaux ===
A day after leaving Celje, Riera became the new manager of Bordeaux – now in Ligue 2 – returning to the club 18 years after his playing tenure and signing a contract until June 2025. His debut on 21 October was a 2–0 loss at Angers.

Riera led his team to a 12th-place finish. However, Bordeaux were administratively relegated to the Championnat National and declared bankruptcy before the start of the new season.

=== Return to Celje ===
Riera returned to Celje on 29 July 2024, on a two-year deal. Just one day later, he oversaw a 5–0 away defeat against Slovan Bratislava in the Champions League second qualifying round, being eliminated 6–1 on aggregate; this was the club's heaviest defeat in European competitions, and also the manager's joint-heaviest in that role. However, the team managed to reach the Conference League league phase, their first ever appearance in the main stage of any European competition. They eventually progressed to the quarter-finals, a feat achieved for the first time by any Slovenian side.

Riera won another domestic cup at the end of the 2024–25 campaign, beating his former employers Koper 4–0 in the final. The triumph granted Celje a spot in the Europa League qualifying rounds, eventually reaching the league phase of the Conference League for the second year in a row. The team finished the first half of the next domestic league in first place, twelve points ahead of second-placed Maribor; similarly to the previous season, they also qualified for the Conference League play-offs.

=== Eintracht Frankfurt ===
On 30 January 2026, Riera was appointed as head coach of Bundesliga side Eintracht Frankfurt on a two-and-a-half-year contract, starting on 2 February. On his debut, he oversaw a 1–1 draw away to Union Berlin.

Eintracht and Riera parted ways following a 2–2 draw against VfB Stuttgart on the final day of the season.

=== Red Star Belgrade ===
On 14 August 2026, Riera became the new manager of Serbian SuperLiga club Red Star Belgrade on a two-year deal. His first competitive fixture was the Europa League play-off round; following a 3–0 home victory over Viktoria Plzeň, in the second leg his team played with one player less for 70 minutes – the tie went to extra time – and eventually lost 5–1 in the Czech Republic.

== Personal life ==
Riera's younger brother, Sito, is also a footballer. He represented Espanyol as well, but only their reserve team.

In 2009, Riera married Russian Julia Koroleva, with whom he has three children. He moved to Omsk in Siberia, where he set up a football academy. Riera and Koroleva divorced in 2023.

== Career statistics ==
=== Club ===
Appearances and goals by club, season and competition
Club	Season	League			National cup		League cup		Continental		Total	
Club	Season	Division	Apps	Goals	Apps	Goals	Apps	Goals	Apps	Goals	Apps	Goals
Mallorca B	1999–2000	Segunda División B	7	1	—		—		—		7	1
Mallorca B	2000–01	Segunda División B	31	6	—		—		—		31	6
Mallorca B	2001–02	Segunda División B	16	5	—		—		—		16	5
Mallorca B	Total		54	12	0	0	0	0	0	0	54	12
Mallorca	2000–01	La Liga	3	1	0	0	—		—		3	1
Mallorca	2001–02	La Liga	8	1	3	1	—		3	0	14	2
Mallorca	2002–03	La Liga	35	4	8	0	—		—		43	4
Mallorca	Total		46	6	11	1	0	0	3	0	60	7
Bordeaux	2003–04	Ligue 1	32	2	2	0	—		10	5	44	7
Bordeaux	2004–05	Ligue 1	21	2	2	0	—		—		23	2
Bordeaux	Total		53	4	4	0	0	0	10	5	67	9
Espanyol	2005–06	La Liga	8	0	—		—		3	0	11	0
Espanyol	2006–07	La Liga	28	4	1	0	2	0	13	4	44	8
Espanyol	2007–08	La Liga	36	4	3	0	—		—		39	4
Espanyol	Total		72	8	4	0	2	0	16	4	94	12
Manchester City (loan)	2005–06	Premier League	15	1	4	0	—		—		19	1
Liverpool	2008–09	Premier League	28	3	3	1	—		9	1	40	5
Liverpool	2009–10	Premier League	12	0	0	0	1	0	3	0	16	0
Liverpool	Total		40	3	3	1	1	0	12	1	56	5
Olympiacos	2010–11	Super League Greece	26	6	2	0	—		0	0	28	6
Galatasaray	2011–12	Süper Lig	30	1	2	0	0	0	—		32	1
Galatasaray	2012–13	Süper Lig	26	2	0	0	0	0	9	0	35	2
Galatasaray	2013–14	Süper Lig	4	0	4	1	0	0	5	0	13	1
Galatasaray	Total		60	3	6	1	0	0	14	0	80	4
Watford	2013–14	Football League Championship	8	1	—		—		—		8	1
Udinese	2014–15	Serie A	0	0	0	0	—		—		0	0
Mallorca	2014–15	Segunda División	6	0	—		—		—		6	0
Zavrč	2015–16	Slovenian PrvaLiga	12	1	2	1	—		—		14	2
Koper	2015–16	Slovenian PrvaLiga	1	0	—		—		—		1	0
Career total			393	45	36	4	3	0	55	10	487	59

=== International ===
Appearances and goals by national team and year
National team	Year	Apps	Goals
Spain	2007	3	1
Spain	2008	4	0
Spain	2009	9	3
Total		16	4

Scores and results list Spain's goal tally first, score column indicates score after each Riera goal.

List of international goals scored by Albert Riera
No.	Date	Venue	Opponent	Score	Result	Competition
1	13 October 2007	NRGi Park, Aarhus, Denmark	Denmark	3–1	3–1	Euro 2008 qualifying
2	1 April 2009	Ali Sami Yen, Istanbul, Turkey	Turkey	2–1	2–1	2010 World Cup qualification
3	9 June 2009	Tofiq Bahramov, Baku, Azerbaijan	Azerbaijan	4–0	6–0	Friendly
4	12 August 2009	Philip II Arena, Skopje, Macedonia	Macedonia	3–2	3–2	Friendly

== Managerial statistics ==
As of 21 November 2026

Managerial record by team and tenure
Club	From	To	Record				
Club	From	To	P	W	D	L	Win %
Olimpija Ljubljana	4 July 2022	31 May 2023	46	30	6	10	65.22
Celje	20 July 2023	11 October 2023	17	11	3	3	64.71
Bordeaux	12 October 2023	29 July 2024	32	12	8	12	37.50
Celje	29 July 2024	1 February 2026	94	50	21	23	53.19
Eintracht Frankfurt	2 February 2026	17 May 2026	14	4	5	5	28.57
Red Star Belgrade	14 August 2026	present	19	15	2	2	78.95
Total			222	122	45	55	54.95

== Honours ==
=== Player ===
Mallorca

- Copa del Rey: 2002–03

Espanyol

- UEFA Cup runner-up: 2006–07

Olympiacos

- Super League Greece: 2010–11

Galatasaray

- Süper Lig: 2011–12, 2012–13
- Turkish Super Cup: 2012

Spain

- FIFA Confederations Cup third place: 2009

=== Manager ===
Olimpija Ljubljana

- Slovenian PrvaLiga: 2022–23
- Slovenian Cup: 2022–23

Celje

- Slovenian Cup: 2024–25
