= 2008–09 Liverpool F.C. season =

English football club season

Liverpool
2008–09 season
- Chairman: Tom Hicks and George Gillett
- Manager: Rafael Benítez
- Stadium: Anfield
- Premier League: 2nd
- FA Cup: Fourth round
- League Cup: Fourth round
- UEFA Champions League: Quarter-finals
- Top goalscorer: League: Steven Gerrard (16); All: Steven Gerrard (24)
- Highest home attendance: 44,424 vs. Arsenal (21 April 2009)
- Lowest home attendance: 28,591 vs. Crewe Alexandra (23 September 2008)
- Average home league attendance: 43,611
Home colours	Away colours	Third colours

The 2008–2009 season was Liverpool's 117th season in existence and their 47th consecutive season in the top-flight of English football. The season began on 1 July 2008 and concluded on 30 June 2009, with competitive matches played between August and May. Having finished the previous Premier League season in fourth place behind Manchester United, Chelsea and Arsenal, Liverpool improved to end the 2008–09 campaign in second place, four points behind Manchester United, with a record of 25 wins, 11 draws and two defeats. Liverpool made little progress in the domestic cup competitions and were eliminated in the fourth round of both the FA Cup and League Cup by Everton and Tottenham Hotspur respectively. They were defeated in the quarter-final of the UEFA Champions League by Chelsea.

Liverpool acquired eight players in the transfer market, including Philipp Degen, Andrea Dossena and Diego Cavalieri who arrived in early July. They were supplemented by striker Robbie Keane from Tottenham and midfielder Albert Riera in August. A total of eight players departed including John Arne Riise, Steve Finnan, Harry Kewell, goalkeeper Scott Carson and striker Peter Crouch who were all transferred in the summer transfer window. Six months after arriving at Liverpool, Keane was sold back to Tottenham in the winter transfer window.

Liverpool began the season in good form; they won eight of their first ten matches before suffering a defeat against Tottenham. They picked up their form after this and a 5–1 victory over Newcastle United at the end of 2008 ensured that they would be top of the league going into the New Year. Three successive draws at the turn of the year meant that Manchester United caught Liverpool and a 2–0 defeat by Middlesbrough at the end of February dented their hopes of winning the league. Liverpool then won ten of their final eleven matches, including a 4–1 victory over Manchester United. The run was not enough to overhaul United and Liverpool finished four points behind in second place.

Twenty-six different players represented the club in four competitions, and there were 16 different goalscorers. Liverpool's top goalscorer was Steven Gerrard, who scored 24 goals in 44 matches. Defender Jamie Carragher made the most appearances during the season with 54.

== Background ==
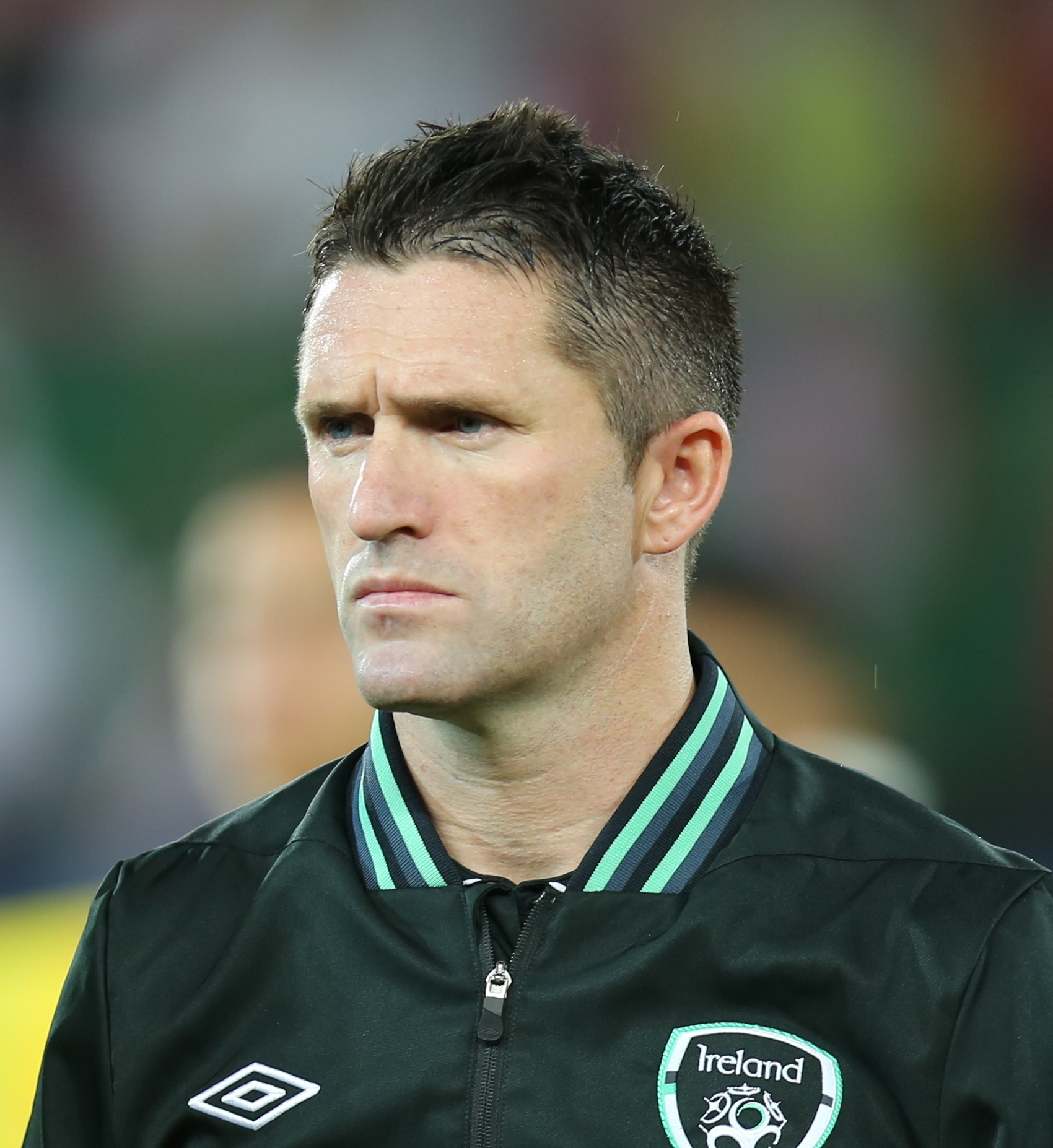
Striker Robbie Keane joined Liverpool in July 2008, but returned to Tottenham Hotspur in January 2009.

Liverpool did not win any trophies in the 2007–08 season. Despite new signing Fernando Torres scoring 33 goals in all competitions, including 24 in the Premier League, the team finished in fourth place, 11 points behind eventual winners Manchester United. They fared little better in the cup competitions, exiting the FA Cup in the fifth round by losing 2–1 to Championship club Barnsley at Anfield. A 2–0 defeat against Chelsea resulted in Liverpool's exit from the League Cup in the quarter-finals. Liverpool fared better in European competition, reaching the semi-finals of the UEFA Champions League. For the fourth consecutive year in the competition, they faced Chelsea, but lost the tie 4–3 on aggregate.

Liverpool made a number of additions to their squad during the pre-season. Defenders Philipp Degen and Andrea Dossena were the first to arrive from Borussia Dortmund and Udinese respectively. Goalkeeper Diego Cavalieri was signed from Brazilian club Palmeiras as backup to Pepe Reina, while French striker David Ngog joined from Paris Saint-Germain. The biggest signing of the summer transfer window was the purchase of striker Robbie Keane from Tottenham Hotspur for a fee of £19.3 million. Midfielder Albert Riera joined from Spanish club Espanyol at the end of the summer transfer window.

At the end of the 2007–08 season, Liverpool sold a number of players. Defender John Arne Riise was sold to Serie A club Roma after seven years at the club. Forward Anthony Le Tallec was sold to French club Le Mans, while midfielder Harry Kewell joined Turkish club Galatasaray on a free transfer. Later in July, striker Peter Crouch joined his former club, Portsmouth, for £11 million and goalkeeper Scott Carson was sold to West Bromwich Albion. Defender Steve Finnan and midfielder Danny Guthrie left in August to join Espanyol and Newcastle United respectively. During the January transfer window, striker Robbie Keane returned to Tottenham after only six months at Liverpool. Sebastián Leto joined Olympiacos on a two-year loan after his application for a work permit was rejected, while striker Andriy Voronin was loaned to Hertha BSC.

Manchester United were the pre-season favourites to retain their league title with Chelsea considered their main challengers. Liverpool were expected to struggle initially while their new signings adapted to the squad. The Guardian's Paul Doyle opined, "If they are to sustain a challenge for the title beyond Christmas, Liverpool will have to develop the offensive diversity and unpredictability to turn last season's costly draws against smaller teams into victories."

=== Transfers ===
==== In ====
Players transferred in
No.	Position	Player	Transferred from	Fee	Date	Ref
27	DF	Philipp Degen	Borussia Dortmund	Free	4 July 2008	
2	DF	Andrea Dossena	Udinese	£7,000,000	4 July 2008	
1	GK	Diego Cavalieri	Palmeiras	£3,000,000	11 July 2008	
24	FW	David Ngog	Paris Saint-Germain	£1,500,000	24 July 2008	
7	FW	Robbie Keane	Tottenham Hotspur	£19,300,000	28 July 2008	
	FW	Vitor Flora	Botafogo	Free	1 September 2008	
42	GK	Péter Gulácsi	MTK	Undisclosed	1 September 2008	
11	MF	Albert Riera	Espanyol	£8,000,000	1 September 2008	

==== Out ====
Players transferred out
No.	Position	Player	Transferred to	Fee	Date	Ref
6	DF	John Arne Riise	Roma	£4,000,000	1 July 2008	
	FW	Anthony Le Tallec	Le Mans	£1,100,000	5 July 2008	
7	MF	Harry Kewell	Galatasaray	Free	5 July 2008	
	GK	Scott Carson	West Bromwich Albion	£3,250,000	18 July 2008	
15	FW	Peter Crouch	Portsmouth	£11,000,000	11 July 2008	
3	DF	Steve Finnan	Espanyol	Undisclosed	1 September 2008	
	MF	Danny Guthrie	Newcastle United	£2,250,000	11 July 2008	
7	FW	Robbie Keane	Tottenham Hotspur	£12,000,000	2 February 2009	

==== Loaned out ====
No.	Position	Player	Loaned to	Date	Ref
33	MF	Sebastián Leto	Olympiacos	5 August 2008	
10	FW	Andriy Voronin	Hertha BSC	1 September 2008	

==== Transfer summary ====
Summary of transfer activity during the season
Period	Spending	Income	Net expenditure
Summer	▼£38,800,000	▲£21,600,000	▼£17,200,000
Winter	£0	▲£12,000,000	▲£12,000,000
Total	▼£38,800,000	▲£33,600,000	▼£5,200,000

=== Pre-season matches ===
Date	Opponents	Venue	Result	Score	Scorers	Attendance
12 July 2008	Tranmere Rovers	A	W	1–0	Benayoun 43'	15,000
16 July 2008	Luzern	A	W	2–1	Lucas 10', Voronin 36'	9,500
19 July 2008	Wisła Kraków	A	D	1–1	Voronin 6'	6,000
22 July 2008	Hertha BSC	A	D	0–0		51,684
30 July 2008	Villarreal	A	D	0–0		22,000
2 August 2008	Rangers	A	W	4–0	Torres 22', Ngog 56', Benayoun 58', Alonso 70' pen.	50,223
5 August 2008	Vålerenga	A	W	4–1	Alonso 19', Torres 49', Benayoun 60', Ngog 84'	25,337
8 August 2008	Lazio	H	W	1–0	Voronin 90+3'	43,062

== Premier League ==
A total of 20 teams competed in the Premier League in the 2008–09 season. Each team played 38 matches; two against every other team and one match at each club's stadium. Three points were awarded for each win, one point per draw, and none for defeats. At the end of the season the top two teams qualified for the group stages of the UEFA Champions League; teams in third and fourth needed to play a qualifier. The provisional fixture list was released on 16 June 2008, but was subject to change in the event of clashes with other competitions, international football, inclement weather, or matches being selected for television coverage.

=== August–October ===
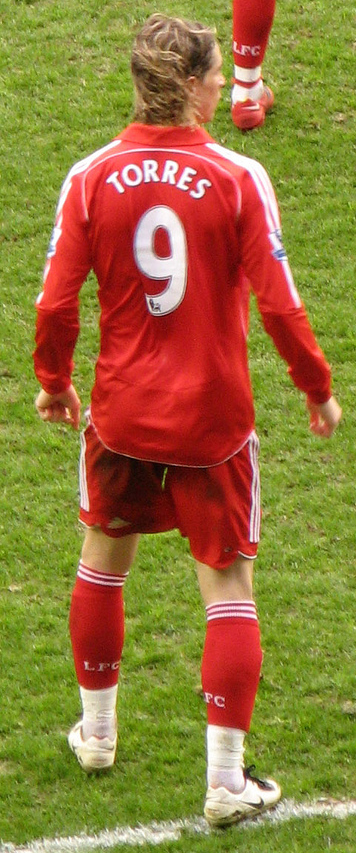
Fernando Torres scored Liverpool's first goal of the season in the Premier League.

Liverpool travelled to Sunderland on the opening weekend of the season. The match was goalless until the 83rd minute when striker Fernando Torres scored from 25 yards (23 m) to secure a 1–0 victory. The following weekend, Liverpool hosted Middlesbrough at Anfield. The visitors went ahead in the 70th minute when Mido scored. They appeared to be heading for victory, until the 86th minute when Jamie Carragher's shot deflected off Middlesbrough defender Emanuel Pogatetz into the Middlesbrough goal. In the sixth minute of stoppage time, Steven Gerrard scored from the edge of the penalty area to secure a 2–1 victory for Liverpool. A trip to Villa Park to face Aston Villa was next for Liverpool. Torres was forced off with an injury within the first half-hour and both sides failed to capitalise on chances to win, as the match finished 0–0.

Due to international fixtures, Liverpool did not play another game for two weeks. On the resumption of club football, they faced reigning champions Manchester United at home. Liverpool started without Gerrard and Torres, who were substitutes following their return from injury. The visitors took the lead in the third minute when Carlos Tevez scored. An own goal by United defender Wes Brown levelled the score in the 27th minute. Liverpool took control of the match following their equaliser, but it was not until the 71st minute that they asserted their dominance, when substitute Ryan Babel scored. United's misery was compounded when defender Nemanja Vidić was sent off in the 90th minute for a second bookable offence. The win marked the first time, Liverpool manager Rafael Benítez had beaten United in the League since his arrival in 2004.

The following weekend, Stoke City were the visitors to Anfield. Liverpool appeared to have taken the lead in the second minute when Gerrard scored from a free kick, but the goal was ruled out for offside. Despite a number of chances, neither side was able to score and the match finished 0–0. Benítez was adamant Gerrard's goal should not have been disallowed stating: "Nobody knows why the effort was ruled out." Liverpool's next match was against local rivals Everton in the Merseyside derby. Following a goalless first half, Torres scored twice in three minutes to secure a 2–0 win. Torres was confident Liverpool could challenge for the title following the victory: "We know if we can stay near the top of the table in January or February we can win it."

Manchester City were the opposition the following week, as Liverpool travelled to their home ground, the City of Manchester Stadium. They were losing 2–0 at half-time after goals by Stephen Ireland and Javier Garrido. However, Liverpool improved in the second half and two goals from Torres levelled the score. A draw appeared likely until Dirk Kuyt scored in the 90th minute to give Liverpool a 3–2 victory. The following weekend, Liverpool faced Wigan Athletic at Anfield. Liverpool went behind when Wigan striker Amr Zaki opened the scoring, Kuyt equalised in the 37th minute, before Zaki scored again in the 45th minute. Liverpool struggled to find an equaliser until the 80th minute when Riera scored. Kuyt scored again in the 85th minute, to secure a 3–2 victory for Liverpool. The following weekend, they travelled to Stamford Bridge to face Chelsea. A Xabi Alonso goal in the 10th minute was enough to secure victory for Liverpool, as they won the match 1–0, becoming the first team since February 2004 to beat Chelsea at Stamford Bridge in the Premier League. Three days later, a Gerrard penalty in the 76th minute secured a 1–0 home victory over Portsmouth.

=== November–December ===
The following weekend, Liverpool faced Tottenham Hotspur at White Hart Lane. They took the lead in the 3rd minute, when Kuyt scored. However, an own goal by Carragher and a last-minute goal from Tottenham striker Roman Pavlyuchenko meant Liverpool suffered their first defeat of the season in the Premier League. Liverpool rebounded the following week as they beat West Bromwich Albion 3–0 at Anfield, courtesy of two goals from Keane and one from Álvaro Arbeloa. They faced Bolton Wanderers the following weekend, at the Reebok Stadium, with goals from Kuyt and Gerrard securing a 2–0 victory. Liverpool hosted Fulham at Anfield the following weekend. They were without injured captain Gerrard for the match, but welcomed back Torres from injury. However, his return did not have the desired impact, as Liverpool failed to score, drawing 0–0. After the match, manager Benítez lamented his side's performance: "It was a bad day, we did not have enough energy and we did not pass the ball well enough."

West Ham United were the next opposition, and the match at Anfield finished with the same scoreline. Despite their inability to convert their chances, Liverpool moved to the top of the table following the draw. Liverpool travelled to Ewood Park to face Blackburn Rovers in their next match and returned to winning ways with a 3–1 victory. Goals from Alonso, Yossi Benayoun and Gerrard secured victory for Liverpool. Liverpool hosted Hull City in their next match, but they fell behind to a goal from defender Paul McShane and an own goal by Carragher. Liverpool recovered through two goals from Gerrard, but were unable to score any further goals, with the match finishing 2–2. Writing in The Observer, Duncan Castles stated the result was "no way to win a title", ridiculing Benítez's claim that the title was 80 per cent Liverpool's if they were top at Christmas. Liverpool travelled to the Emirates Stadium to face Arsenal the following weekend. Arsenal striker Robin van Persie opened the scoring in the 24th minute, but Keane equalised in the 42nd minute. Despite Arsenal striker Emmanuel Adebayor being sent off in the 62nd minute, Liverpool were unable to score a winning goal and the match finished 1–1.

Liverpool faced Bolton Wanderers at Anfield on Boxing Day. A first half goal by Riera and two in the second half by Keane secured a 3–0 victory. Two days later, Liverpool travelled to St James' Park to face Newcastle United. Two goals from Gerrard, and one each from Sami Hyypiä, Babel and a penalty from Alonso, gave Liverpool a 5–1 victory. The result meant Liverpool had a four-point lead at the top of the table going into the New Year. Following the match, captain Gerrard was arrested over an incident in a bar where it was alleged that he punched a man over a row about music. He was subsequently cleared of the charges in July.

=== January–February ===
On 10 January 2009, Liverpool faced Stoke City at the Britannia Stadium. In his pre-match press conference, manager Benítez attacked Manchester United manager Sir Alex Ferguson over observations he had made about upcoming fixtures. Liverpool subsequently drew the match 0–0 with Stoke City. Benítez was content with the result: "It is a game we could win but we could also have lost too, and it was important not to lose. When we play against 10 men and an organised team it is not easy." Nine days later, Liverpool faced local rivals Everton at Anfield. Gerrard scored from 25 yards (23 m) in the 68th minute to give Liverpool the lead. However, they were unable to hold onto the lead as Everton midfielder Tim Cahill scored in the 87th minute to level the score at 1–1.

Liverpool's next match was against Wigan Athletic at the JJB Stadium. Midfielder Benayoun gave Liverpool the lead in the 41st minute but as in the two previous matches, they were unable to hold onto the lead. Midfielder Lucas conceded a penalty for a foul on Jason Koumas, which was converted by striker Mido on his debut in the 83rd minute to level the score at 1–1. The result saw Liverpool drop to third in the table. Liverpool faced Chelsea in their next match at Anfield. Chelsea midfielder Frank Lampard was sent off in the 60th minute for a foul on Alonso, but Liverpool struggled to make their numerical advantage count. It was not until the 89th minute that they did so, when Torres headed in a cross from Fábio Aurélio. Torres scored again a minute later to give Liverpool a 2–0 victory.

Liverpool travelled to Fratton Park for their next match against Portsmouth. They fell behind in the 62nd minute when David Nugent scored. Aurelio levelled the score with a free kick before Hermann Hreiðarsson gave Portsmouth the lead again. Kuyt equalised with five minutes remaining before Torres scored 'a dramatic late header' to secure a 3–2 win for Liverpool. Liverpool hosted Manchester City when club football resumed after the international break. A 'poor Liverpool' drew the match 1–1 to fall further behind leaders Manchester United after they had beaten Blackburn. Liverpool faced Middlesbrough at the Riverside Stadium the following weekend. Their 'title ambitions were dealt a severe blow' as Middlesbrough won the match 2–0.

=== March–May ===
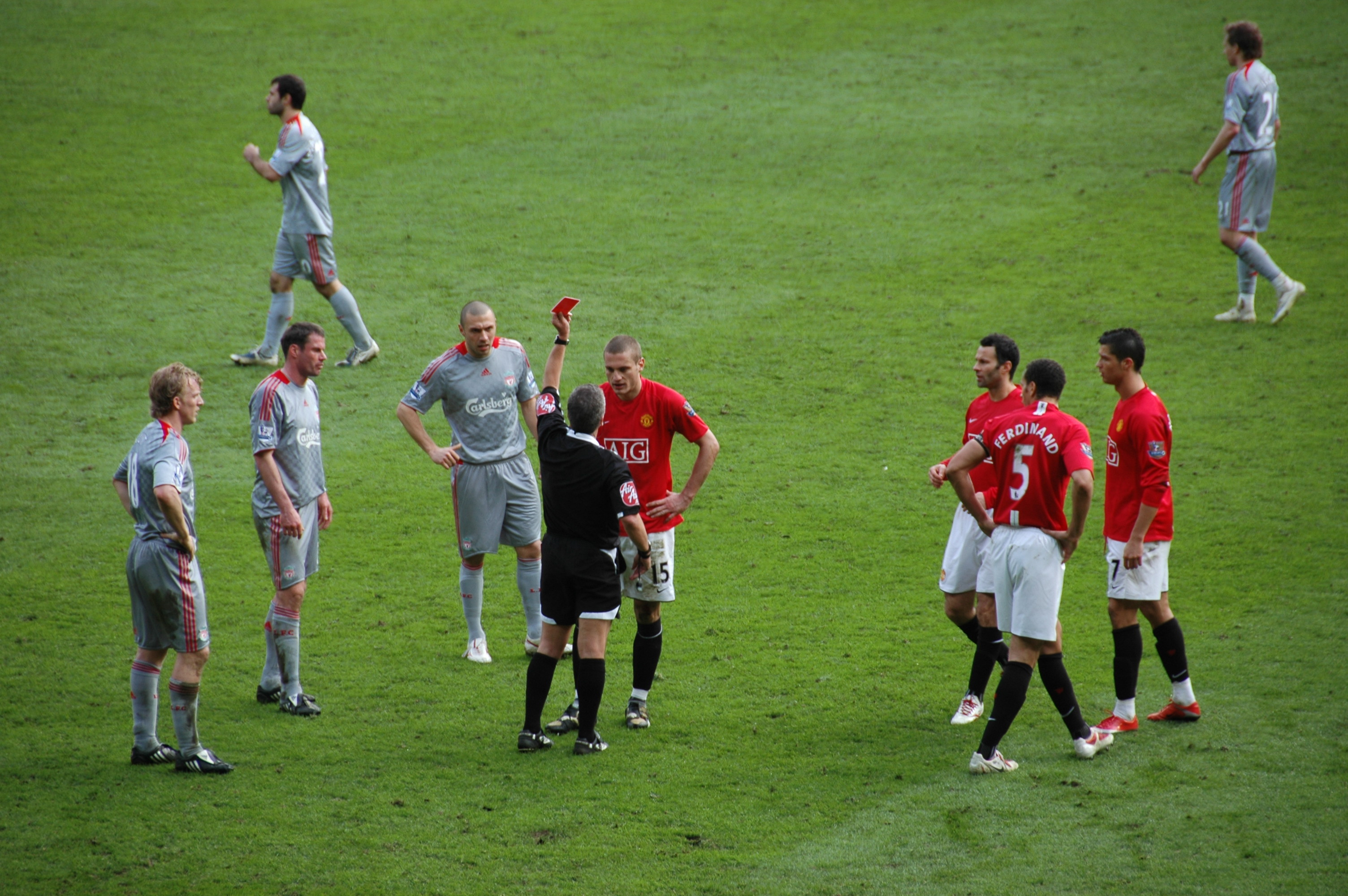
Manchester United defender Nemanja Vidić was sent off during Liverpool's 4–1 victory against their rivals.

Sunderland were the next opposition in a midweek match at Anfield. Goals from Ngog and Benayoun secured a 2–0 victory for Liverpool. Following the resumption of club football after the international break, Liverpool travelled to Old Trafford to face league leaders Manchester United. Liverpool were trailing United, who had a game in hand, by seven points as they went into the match. Liverpool went behind to a Cristiano Ronaldo penalty, before Gerrard and Torres scored to give them a 2–1 lead at half-time. Further goals from Aurelio and Dossena secured a 4–1 victory for Liverpool, reducing their deficit to United to four points. Liverpool hosted Aston Villa the following weekend. A win was imperative after rivals Manchester United lost to Fulham. A Gerrard hat-trick with goals from Kuyt and Riera secured a 5–0 win, as they moved to one point behind United. Manager Benitez was confident Liverpool could keep the pressure on United: "Clearly we have confidence and the team is playing well. But we must just wait to see what happens next to United, while we must keep going and keep the team playing at this level."

Liverpool travelled to Craven Cottage to face Fulham in their next match. They struggled to break down the Fulham defence, with Dossena and Alonso hitting the crossbar, while Torres hit the post with a shot. However, Benayoun secured a 1–0 victory with a 'dramatic injury-time winner.' The following weekend Liverpool hosted Blackburn Rovers. A 4–0 victory was secured courtesy of two goals from Torres and one from Daniel Agger and Ngog. Ten days later, Liverpool faced Arsenal at Anfield. They went behind to a goal from Andrey Arshavin in the first half, but goals from Torres and Benayoun early in the second half gave them a 2–1 lead. Arshavin scored two goals in three minutes before Torres scored again to level the score at 3–3. Arshavin scored his fourth goal in the last minute, but Benayoun scored in the fifth minute of stoppage time to secure a 4–4 draw.

Liverpool travelled to the KC Stadium four days later to face Hull City. Two goals from Kuyt and one from Babel secured a 3–1 victory. Newcastle United were the opposition the following weekend at Anfield. Goals from Benayoun, Kuyt and Lucas secured a 3–0 victory for Liverpool. Their next match was against West Ham United at the Upton Park. Two goals from Gerrard and one from Babel secured a 3–0 victory. The victory put Liverpool ahead of rivals Manchester United at the top of the table, but United had two games in hands over their rivals, including the Manchester derby against Manchester City. Captain Steven Gerrard was hopeful United would slip up in one of the games: "They have a tough game against Manchester City, who have come into form recently, and it's a derby match, which are never easy. We hope Manchester City can do us a favour." Liverpool's next match was a 2–0 victory against West Bromwich Albion. Goals from Gerrard and Kuyt won the match, but they were not enough to sustain their title challenge. United's draw against Arsenal the previous day meant they finished the season as champions. Liverpool's final match of the season was against Tottenham, a 3–1 victory with goals from Torres, an Alan Hutton own goal and Benayoun. The match marked defender Sami Hyypiä's 464th and final appearance for Liverpool and confirmed their second-place finish in the league with 86 points, four points behind United's total of 90.

=== League table ===
Pos	Team	Pld	W	D	L	GF	GA	GD	Pts	Qualification or relegation
1	Manchester United (C)	38	28	6	4	68	24	+44	90	Qualification for the Champions League group stage (Note: Since both finalists of the FA Cup (Chelsea and Everton) and the League Cup winners (Manchester United) qualified for the European competitions based on their league position, the sixth-placed team (Aston Villa) received a berth in the Europa League play-off round and the seventh-placed team (Fulham) received a berth in the Europa League third qualifying round.)
2	Liverpool	38	25	11	2	77	27	+50	86	Qualification for the Champions League group stage
3	Chelsea	38	25	8	5	68	24	+44	83	Qualification for the Champions League group stage
4	Arsenal	38	20	12	6	68	37	+31	72	Qualification for the Champions League play-off round
5	Everton	38	17	12	9	55	37	+18	63	Qualification for the Europa League play-off round

Source: Barclays Premier League
Rules for classification: 1) points; 2) goal difference; 3) number of goals scored.
(C) Champions

==== Results summary ====
Overall								Home						Away					
Pld	W	D	L	GF	GA	GD	Pts	W	D	L	GF	GA	GD	W	D	L	GF	GA	GD
38	25	11	2	77	27	+50	86	12	7	0	41	13	+28	13	4	2	36	14	+22

==== Results by round ====
Round	1	2	3	4	5	6	7	8	9	10	11	12	13	14	15	16	17	18	19	20	21	22	23	24	25	26	27	28	29	30	31	32	33	34	35	36	37	38
Ground	A	H	A	H	H	A	A	H	A	H	A	H	A	H	H	A	H	A	H	A	A	H	A	H	A	H	A	H	A	H	A	H	H	A	H	A	A	H
Result	W	W	D	W	D	W	W	W	W	W	L	W	W	D	D	W	D	D	W	W	D	D	D	W	W	D	L	W	W	W	W	W	D	W	W	W	W	W
Position	8	2	2	2	3	2	2	2	1	1	2	2	2	2	1	1	1	1	1	1	1	2	3	2	2	2	3	3	3	2	2	2	2	2	2	2	2	2

A = Away; H = Home; W = Won; D = Drawn; L = Lost

==== Matches ====
Date	Opponents	Venue	Result	Score	Scorers	Attendance	Ref
16 August 2008	Sunderland	A	W	1–0	Torres 83'	43,259	
23 August 2008	Middlesbrough	H	W	2–1	Pogatetz 86' o.g., Gerrard 90+4'	43,168	
31 August 2008	Aston Villa	A	D	0–0		41,617	
13 September 2008	Manchester United	H	W	2–1	Brown 27' o.g., Babel 77'	44,195	
20 September 2008	Stoke City	H	D	0–0		43,931	
27 September 2008	Everton	A	W	2–0	Torres (2) 59', 62'	39,574	
5 October 2008	Manchester City	A	W	3–2	Torres (2) 55', 73', Kuyt 90'	47,280	
18 October 2008	Wigan Athletic	H	W	3–2	Kuyt (2) 37', 85', Riera 80'	43,868	
26 October 2008	Chelsea	A	W	1–0	Alonso 10'	41,705	
29 October 2008	Portsmouth	H	W	1–0	Gerrard 76' pen.	43,378	
1 November 2008	Tottenham Hotspur	A	L	1–2	Kuyt 3'	36,183	
8 November 2008	West Bromwich Albion	H	W	3–0	Keane (2) 34', 43', Arbeloa 90+3'	43,451	
15 November 2008	Bolton Wanderers	A	W	2–0	Kuyt 28', Gerrard 73'	24,893	
22 November 2008	Fulham	H	D	0–0		43,589	
1 December 2008	West Ham United	H	D	0–0		41,169	
6 December 2008	Blackburn Rovers	A	W	3–1	Alonso 69', Benayoun 79', Gerrard 90+4'	26,290	
13 December 2008	Hull City	H	D	2–2	Gerrard (2) 24', 32'	43,835	
21 December 2008	Arsenal	A	D	1–1	Keane 42'	60,094	
26 December 2008	Bolton Wanderers	H	W	3–0	Riera 26', Keane (2) 53', 58'	43,548	
28 December 2008	Newcastle United	A	W	5–1	Gerrard (2) 31', 66', Hyypiä 36', Babel 50', Alonso 77' pen.	52,114	
10 January 2009	Stoke City	A	D	0–0		27,500	
19 January 2009	Everton	H	D	1–1	Gerrard 68'	44,382	
28 January 2009	Wigan Athletic	A	D	1–1	Benayoun 41'	21,237	
1 February 2009	Chelsea	H	W	2–0	Torres (2) 89', 90+4'	44,174	
7 February 2009	Portsmouth	A	W	3–2	Aurélio 69', Kuyt 85', Torres 90+2'	20,527	
22 February 2009	Manchester City	H	D	1–1	Kuyt 78'	44,259	
28 February 2009	Middlesbrough	A	L	0–2		33,724	
3 March 2009	Sunderland	H	W	2–0	Ngog 52', Benayoun 66'	41,587	
14 March 2009	Manchester United	A	W	4–1	Torres 28', Gerrard 44' pen., Aurélio 77', Dossena 90+1'	75,569	
22 March 2009	Aston Villa	H	W	5–0	Kuyt 8', Riera 33', Gerrard (3) 39' pen., 50', 65', pen.	44,131	
4 April 2009	Fulham	A	W	1–0	Benayoun 90+2'	25,661	
11 April 2009	Blackburn Rovers	H	W	4–0	Torres (2) 5', 33', Agger 83', Ngog 90'	43,466	
21 April 2009	Arsenal	H	D	4–4	Torres (2) 49', 72', Benayoun (2) 56', 90+4'	44,424	
25 April 2009	Hull City	A	W	3–1	Alonso 45', Kuyt (2) 63', 89'	24,942	
3 May 2009	Newcastle United	H	W	3–0	Benayoun 22', Kuyt 28', Lucas 87'	44,121	
9 May 2009	West Ham United	A	W	3–0	Gerrard (2) 2', 38, Babel 84'	34,951	
17 May 2009	West Bromwich Albion	A	W	2–0	Gerrard 28', Kuyt 63'	26,138	
24 May 2009	Tottenham Hotspur	H	W	3–1	Torres 31', Hutton 64' o.g., Benayoun 81'	43,937	

== FA Cup ==
Liverpool entered the competition in the third round, by virtue of their Premier League status. Their opening match was away against Preston North End. A goal from Riera in the first half and a last minute goal by striker Fernando Torres secured a 2–0 victory for Liverpool at Deepdale.

Liverpool were drawn against local rivals Everton at home in the fourth round. A Joleon Lescott goal in the first half gave Everton the lead, which they held until the 54th minute when Gerrard equalised. Neither club was able to score a winning goal and the match finished 1–1. The tie was replayed at Goodison Park on 4 February 2009. No goals were scored during 90 minutes, so the match went to extra time. With two minutes remaining, Everton midfielder Dan Gosling scored to secure a 1–0 victory.

Round	Date	Opponents	Venue	Result	Score	Scorers	Attendance	Ref
Third round	3 January 2009	Preston North End	A	W	2–0	Riera 24', Torres 90+3'	23,046	
Fourth round	25 January 2009	Everton	H	D	1–1	Gerrard 54'	43,524	
Fourth round replay	4 February 2009	Everton	A	L	0–1 (a.e.t.)		37,918	

== League Cup ==
The League Cup is a cup competition open to clubs in the Premier League and Football League. Like the FA Cup it is played on a knockout basis, with the exception of the second round and semi-finals, which are contested over a two-legged tie. Together with the other clubs playing in European competitions, Liverpool entered the League Cup in the third round. They were drawn to face Crewe Alexandra on 30 August 2008. Benítez fielded a relatively young team for the tie, which took the lead in the 15th minute when Agger scored. Crewe equalised ten minutes later when Michael O'Connor scored. A goal by Lucas in the second half secured a 2–1 victory for Liverpool.

Liverpool faced Tottenham Hotspur in the fourth round. They fell behind in the 38th minute when Tottenham striker Roman Pavlyuchenko scored. Tottenham extended their lead four minutes later courtesy of a Fraizer Campbell goal. A further goal before half-time for Campbell, gave Tottenham a 3–0 lead. Damien Plessis pulled a goal back for Liverpool early in the second half, but three minutes later Pavlyuchenko scored again to extend Tottenham's lead. A Hyypiä goal in the 63rd minute was the final goal of the match, which Liverpool lost 4–2, exiting the competition.

Round	Date	Opponents	Venue	Result	Score	Scorers	Attendance	Ref
Third round	23 September 2008	Crewe Alexandra	H	W	2–1	Agger 15', Lucas 58'	28,591	
Fourth round	12 November 2008	Tottenham Hotspur	A	L	2–4	Plessis 49', Hyypiä 63'	33,242	

== UEFA Champions League ==
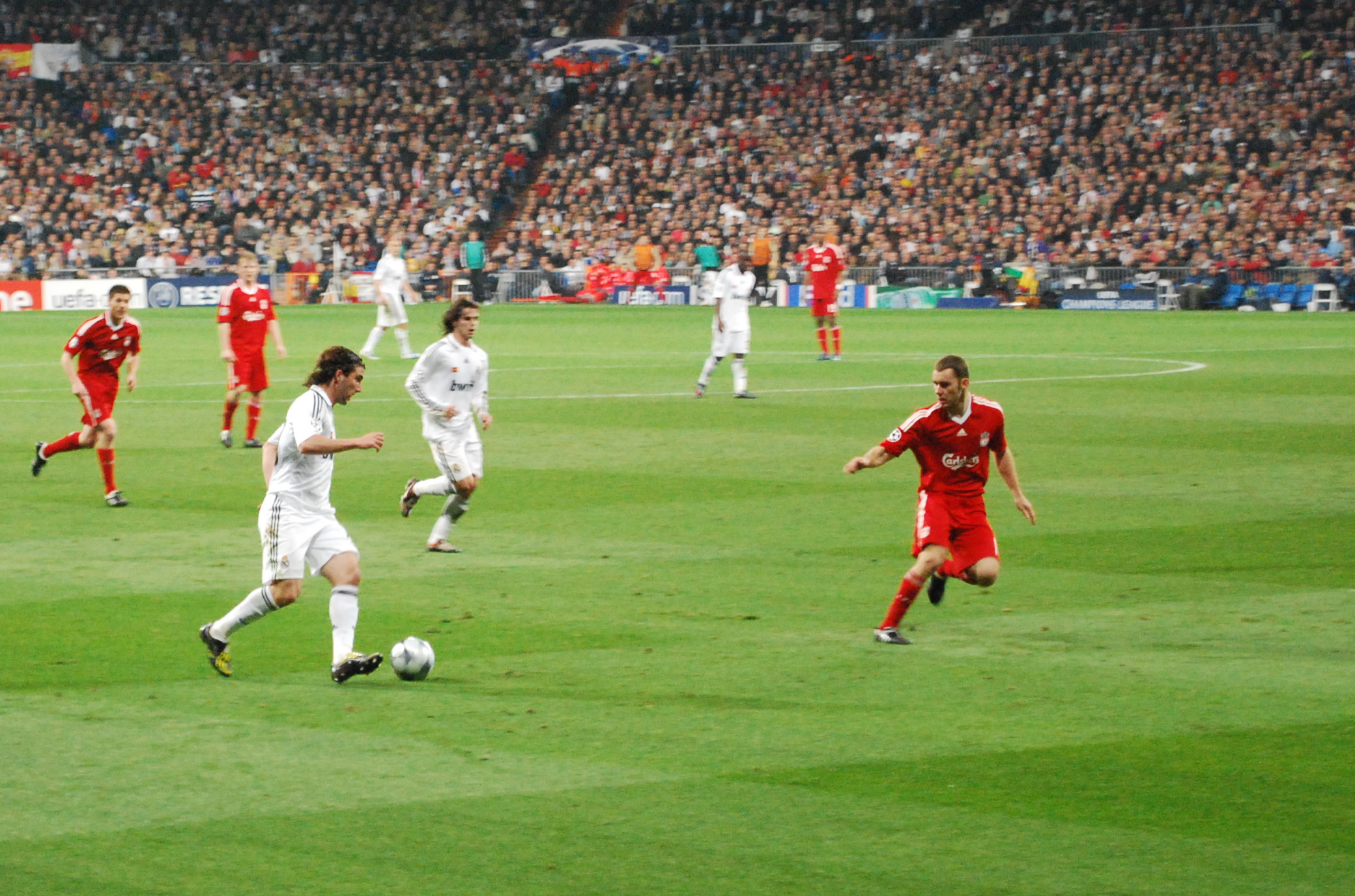
Liverpool won the first leg of their round of 16 meeting with Real Madrid 1–0.

As Liverpool had finished fourth in the league the previous season, they needed to play a qualifying round against Standard Liège to ensure progression into the group stages. A 0–0 draw in the first leg meant the tie hinged on the result of the second leg at Anfield. With the match goalless in extra time, Kuyt scored to give Liverpool a 1–0 victory. Liverpool were drawn in Group D along with Atlético Madrid, Marseille and PSV Eindhoven.

Liverpool's first match in the group was away to Marseille. Two goals by Gerrard gave Liverpool a 2–1 victory over the French team. The next match at Anfield against PSV resulted in a 3–1 victory for Liverpool, with Keane scoring his first goal for the club. Atlético Madrid were the opponents in the third matchday at the Vicente Calderón Stadium. Keane scored again, but a goal for Atlético by Simão meant the match finished 1–1. The score in the reverse fixture at Anfield was the same, with Gerrard scoring a penalty in the 95th minute after Maxi Rodríguez had given Atlético the lead. Liverpool faced Marseille in the fifth match of the group stage and secured progression to the knockout phase, after winning 1–0 thanks to a Gerrard goal. Liverpool's last match was at the Philips Stadion against PSV, which they won 3–1. They finished top of the group with 14 points after 4 wins and 2 draws.

Liverpool were drawn against Spanish team Real Madrid in the knockout phase. They won the first leg 0–1 at the Santiago Bernabéu thanks to a Benayoun goal. Fernando Torres opened the scoring for Liverpool in the second leg at Anfield, before a penalty and a goal from open play from Gerrard and a goal from Dossena secured a 4–0 victory and a 5–0 aggregate win. Chelsea were the opposition in the quarter-finals, marking the fifth consecutive season that the two sides had met in the competition. Liverpool took the lead in the first leg at Anfield when Torres scored in the sixth minute. However, two goals from defender Branislav Ivanović and one from striker Didier Drogba secured a 3–1 victory for Chelsea. Liverpool scored two goals in the first half through Aurélio and Alonso to level the tie at 3–3. Drogba, defender Alex and midfielder Frank Lampard scored to give Chelsea a 3–2 and a three-goal advantage in the tie midway through the second half. However, Liverpool scored two late goals through Lucas and Kuyt to take a 4–3 lead in the match, with one more goal sufficient to progress to the semi-finals courtesy of the away goals rule. A further goal by Lampard in the 89th minute ended any hopes of a comeback as the match was drawn 4–4, with Chelsea winning the tie 7–5 on aggregate.

Group D
Pos	Team	Pld	W	D	L	GF	GA	GD	Pts	Qualification
1	(England) Liverpool	6	4	2	0	11	5	+6	14	Advance to knockout phase
2	(Spain) Atlético Madrid	6	3	3	0	9	4	+5	12	Advance to knockout phase
3	(France) Marseille	6	1	1	4	5	7	−2	4	Transfer to UEFA Cup
4	(Netherlands) PSV Eindhoven	6	1	0	5	5	14	−9	3	

Source: RSSSF

Round	Date	Opponents	Venue	Result	Score	Scorers	Attendance	Ref
Third qualifying round	13 August 2008	Standard Liège	A	D	0–0		27,500	
Third qualifying round	27 August 2008	Standard Liège	H	W	1–0	Kuyt 117'	43,889	
Group stage	16 September 2008	Marseille	A	W	2–1	Gerrard (2) 26', 32' pen.	44,841	
Group stage	1 October 2008	PSV	H	W	3–1	Kuyt 4', Keane 34', Gerrard 76'	41,907	
Group stage	22 October 2008	Atlético Madrid	A	D	1–1	Keane 14'	48,769	
Group stage	4 November 2008	Atlético Madrid	H	D	1–1	Gerrard 90+5' pen.	42,010	
Group stage	26 November 2008	Marseille	H	W	1–0	Gerrard 23'	40,024	
Group stage	9 December 2008	PSV	A	W	3–1	Babel 45+2', Riera 68', Ngog 77'	33,500	
Round of 16	25 February 2009	Real Madrid	A	W	1–0	Benayoun 82'	71,579	
Round of 16	10 March 2009	Real Madrid	H	W	4–0	Torres 16', Gerrard (2) 28' pen., 47', Dossena 88'	42,550	
Quarter-final	8 April 2009	Chelsea	H	L	1–3	Torres 6'	42,543	
Quarter-final	14 April 2009	Chelsea	A	D	4–4	Aurélio 19', Alonso 28' pen., Lucas 81', Kuyt 83'	38,286	

== Squad statistics ==
Liverpool used a total of 28 players during the season, with 18 different goalscorers. The team played in a 4–2–3–1 formation throughout the season. Carragher featured in 54 matches, the most of any Liverpool player during the campaign. Along with Reina and Kuyt, he appeared in every Premier League match. Gerrard was the top goalscorer with 24 goals. Lucas Leiva was the only player to be sent off during the season—he was shown a red card during Liverpool's replay of their fourth round FA Cup tie with Everton.

Key

No. = Squad number

Pos = Playing position

Nat. = Nationality

Apps = Appearances

GK = Goalkeeper

DF = Defender

MF = Midfielder

FW = Forward

= Yellow cards

= Red cards

Squad statistics
No.	Pos.	Nat.	Name	Premier League		FA Cup		League Cup		Champions League		Total		Discipline	
No.	Pos.	Nat.	Name	Apps	Goals	Apps	Goals	Apps	Goals	Apps	Goals	Apps	Goals	A yellow rectangular card	A red rectangular card
1	GK	BRA	Diego Cavalieri	0	0	1	0	2	0	1	0	4	0	0	0
2	DF	ITA	Andrea Dossena	16	1	2	0	1	0	7	1	26	2	4	0
4	DF	FIN	Sami Hyypiä	16	1	1	0	2	1	0	0	19	2	1	0
5	DF	DEN	Daniel Agger	18	1	1	0	2	1	5	0	26	2	6	0
7	FW	IRL	Robbie Keane	19	5	1	0	1	0	7	2	28	7	2	0
8	MF	ENG	Steven Gerrard	31	16	3	1	0	0	10	7	44	24	6	0
9	FW	ESP	Fernando Torres	24	14	3	1	2	0	9	2	38	17	3	0
11	MF	ESP	Albert Riera	28	3	3	1	0	0	9	1	40	5	4	0
12	DF	BRA	Fábio Aurélio	24	2	1	1	0	0	8	1	33	3	2	0
14	MF	ESP	Xabi Alonso	33	4	3	0	1	0	10	1	47	5	8	0
15	MF	ISR	Yossi Benayoun	32	8	1	0	0	0	9	1	42	9	1	0
16	MF	ENG	Jermaine Pennant	3	0	0	0	1	0	0	0	4	0	0	0
17	DF	ESP	Álvaro Arbeloa	29	1	2	0	0	0	12	0	43	1	11	0
18	FW	NED	Dirk Kuyt	38	12	2	0	0	0	11	3	51	15	0	0
19	MF	NED	Ryan Babel	27	3	3	0	2	0	10	1	42	4	3	0
20	MF	ARG	Javier Mascherano	27	0	3	0	0	0	8	0	38	0	9	0
21	MF	BRA	Lucas Leiva	25	1	2	0	2	1	10	1	39	3	5	1
22	DF	ARG	Emiliano Insúa	10	0	2	0	1	0	0	0	13	0	0	0
23	DF	ENG	Jamie Carragher	38	0	3	0	1	0	12	0	54	0	5	0
24	FW	FRA	David Ngog	14	2	0	0	2	0	3	1	19	3	1	0
25	GK	ESP	Pepe Reina	38	0	2	0	0	0	11	0	51	0	0	0
26	MF	ENG	Jay Spearing	0	0	0	0	0	0	2	0	2	0	0	0
27	DF	SUI	Philipp Degen	0	0	0	0	2	0	0	0	2	0	0	0
28	MF	FRA	Damien Plessis	1	0	0	0	2	1	2	0	5	1	1	0
31	FW	MAR	Nabil El Zhar	15	0	0	0	2	0	2	0	19	0	3	0
32	DF	ENG	Stephen Darby	0	0	0	0	1	0	1	0	2	0	0	0
34	DF	ENG	Martin Kelly	0	0	0	0	0	0	1	0	1	0	0	0
37	DF	SVK	Martin Škrtel	21	0	2	0	0	0	7	0	30	0	5	0

== Awards ==
Liverpool's performance during the season resulted in the club's personnel winning a number of awards. Benítez was named Premier League Manager of the Month twice in October and March, while Gerrard was named Premier League Player of the Month for March. Gerrard was named Football Writer's Association Footballer of the Year for the first time and he was also named as the Professional Footballer's Association (PFA) Fans' Player of the Year. Gerrard was nominated for the PFA Players' Player of the Year, but the award went to Manchester United's Ryan Giggs instead. Gerrard and teammate Fernando Torres were named in the PFA Team of the Year.

Gerrard and Torres were nominated for the Ballon d'Or at the end of 2009, but they ranked 10th and 11th respectively behind winner Lionel Messi of Barcelona. Both players were also nominated for the FIFA World Player of the Year, but finished eighth and sixth respectively behind winner Messi. Gerrard and Torres were named in the FIFPro World XI for 2009.
