= David Ngog =

French footballer (born 1989)

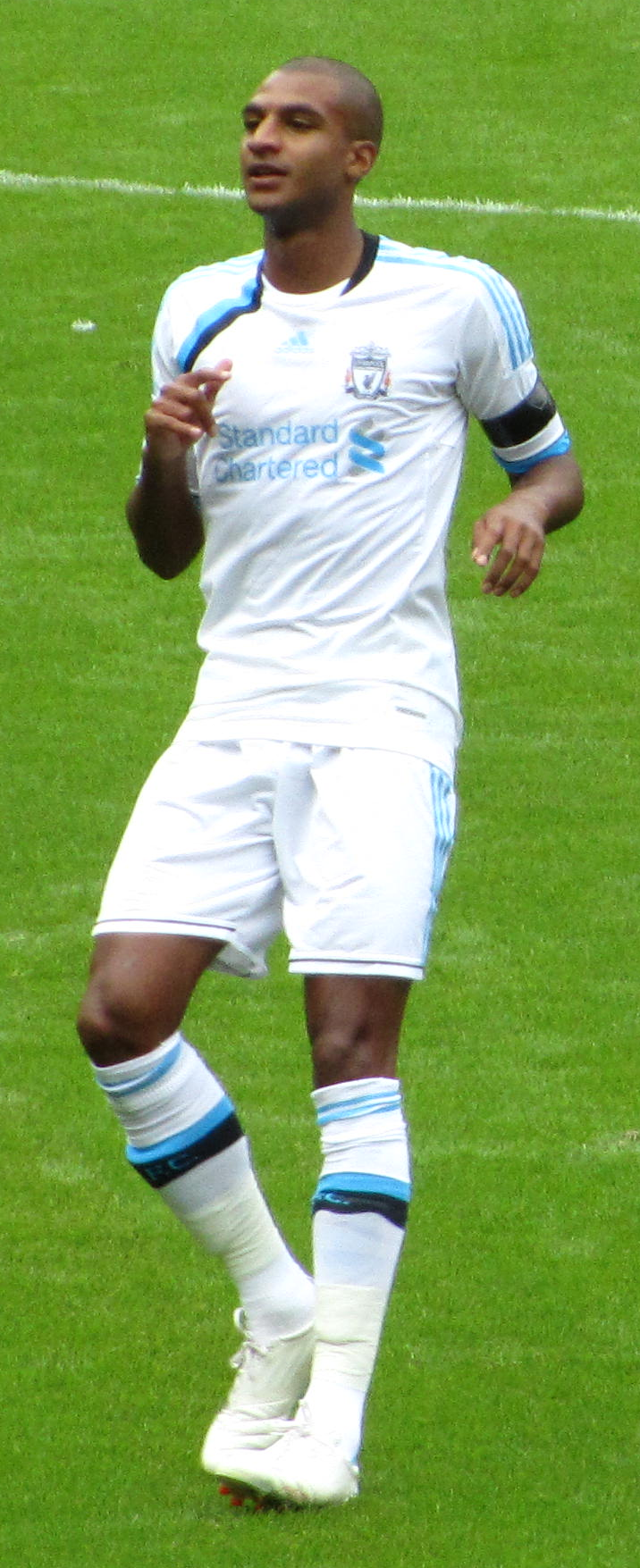
- Ngog playing for Liverpool in 2011

Personal information
- Full name: David Philippe Henri Ngog
- Date of birth: 1 April 1989 (age 37)
- Place of birth: Gennevilliers, France
- Height: 1.90 m (6 ft 3 in)
- Position: Striker

Youth career
- 2001–2006: Paris Saint-Germain

Senior career*
Years	Team	Apps	(Gls)
2006–2008	Paris Saint-Germain	18	(1)
2008–2011	Liverpool	63	(9)
2011–2014	Bolton Wanderers	81	(14)
2014	Swansea City	3	(0)
2014–2016	Reims	44	(10)
2016–2017	Panionios	13	(1)
2018	Ross County	10	(1)
2018–2020	Budapest Honvéd	28	(8)
2020	Žalgiris	2	(1)
2022–2023	Panionios		

International career
2008–2010	France U21	17	(3)
- * Club domestic league appearances and goals

David Philippe Henri Ngog (born 1 April 1989) is a French former professional footballer who played as a striker.

Ngog started his career with French Ligue 1 club Paris Saint-Germain. He made his senior debut in 2006 and in 2008 won the Coupe de la Ligue. English Premier League club Liverpool signed him at the start of the 2008–09 season. After three years, he moved to fellow Premier League club Bolton Wanderers, but was relegated with them after just one season. Following that, Ngog had spells in Greece, Scotland, Hungary, and Lithuania. In 2020, he announced his retirement. However, he made a surprising comeback in 2022, having a one-year stint with third-tier club Panionios.

Ngog is a former France under-21 international. However, he was also eligible to represent Cameroon, by way of his father, and was approached by Cameroon in the past to make the switch.

== Early life ==
David Philippe Henri Ngog was born on 1 April 1989 in Gennevilliers, Hauts-de-Seine, to a Cameroonian father and a French mother. He holds both French and Cameroonian nationalities. He is the cousin of former French international player Jean-Alain Boumsong.

== Club career ==
=== Paris Saint-Germain ===
Ngog started his career with Paris Saint-Germain of Ligue 1 in 2001. He signed his first professional contract in June 2006.

=== Liverpool ===
==== 2008–09 season ====
Manager Rafael Benítez hailed his scouting network after his signing, saying that "They are finding players like Ngog, players with quality who are not a high price". Ngog played his first game for Liverpool in a friendly game against Villarreal on 30 July 2008 and scored his first goal one game later against Rangers in another pre-season friendly. He then followed this up by scoring Liverpool's final goal in their next pre-season friendly, a 4–1 win over Norwegian side Vålerenga. He made his Premier League debut against Aston Villa, coming on as a substitute for Fernando Torres. Ngog scored his first goal for Liverpool in their 3–1 victory over PSV in the group stages of the UEFA Champions League. Ngog made his first start for Liverpool on 7 February 2009 against Portsmouth, and scored his first league goal on 3 March 2009 against Sunderland in a 2–0 win at Anfield. Ngog scored his second league goal for the club on 11 April 2009 against Blackburn Rovers at Anfield in an emphatic 4–0 win.

==== 2009–10 season ====
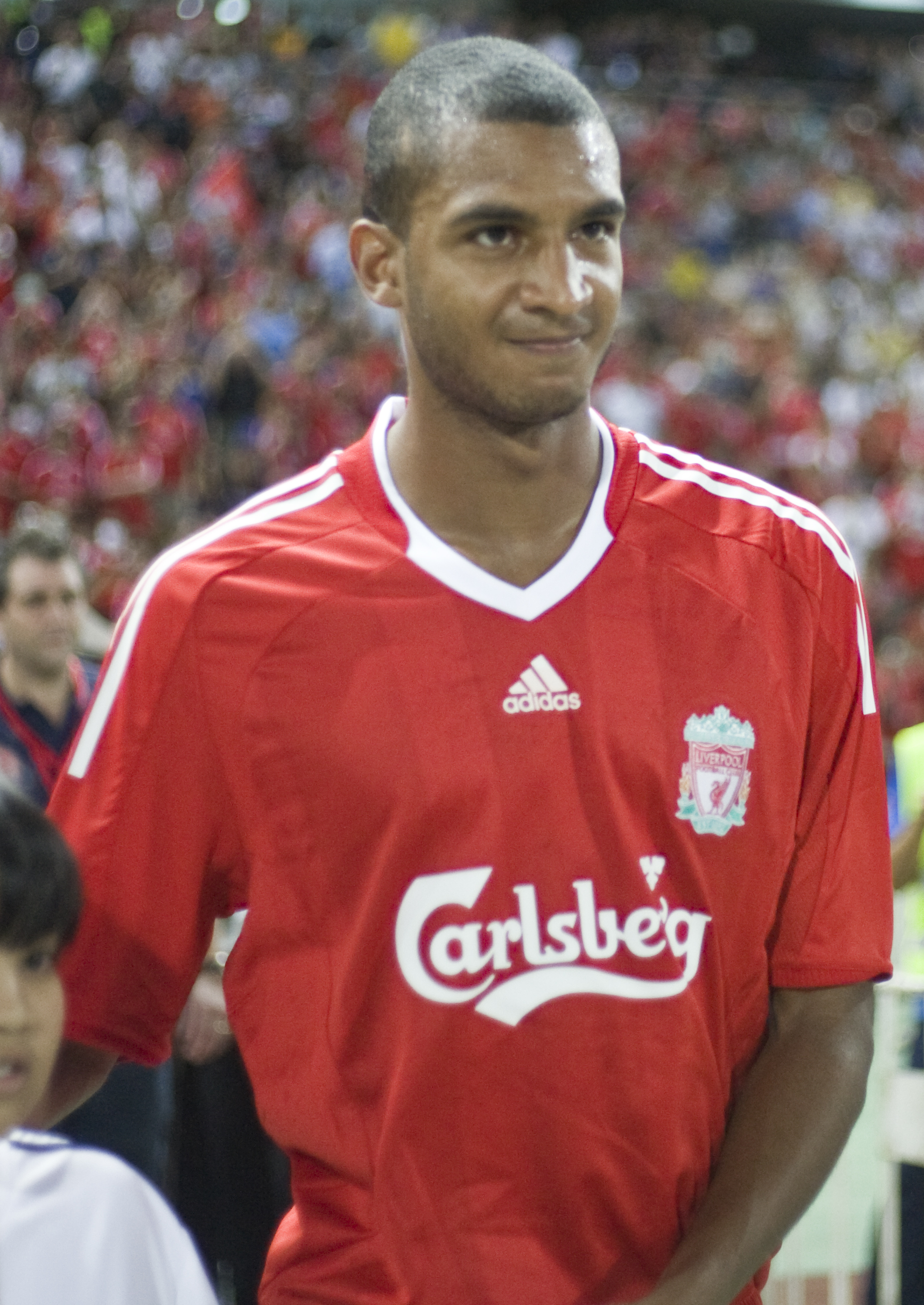
Ngog playing for Liverpool in 2009

Ngog scored his first goal of the new season with the final goal in a 4–0 home win against Stoke City. This was his fourth career goal for Liverpool, three of which came in league matches. The following month, he then went on to score the winning goal in a third-round League Cup game, to win 1–0 away against Leeds United. On 25 October, in a crucial game against Manchester United, he came on for goalscorer Torres at Anfield, scoring a goal in the 96th minute in the 2–0 win to seal an important victory for Liverpool. After the crunch tie, Ngog said scoring the goal was "a fantastic moment for me and the team and I would say it's my best moment in football." He scored his fourth goal of the season on 9 November against Birmingham City before winning a controversial penalty that gave Liverpool a draw after Steven Gerrard converted from the spot. Ngog then scored Liverpool's only goal in their next match away to Debrecen in the Champions League. Benítez showed his faith in Ngog by handing him a start against Everton in the Merseyside derby; this match finished 2–0 to Liverpool. He scored his fourth league goal (six in total of the 2009–10 season) in a 2–1 victory over Wigan Athletic. Ngog's goal nine minutes from time eventually broke the resistance of a determined Unirea Urziceni at Anfield in the Europa League.

==== 2010–11 season ====
On 29 July, Ngog scored twice in Roy Hodgson's first competitive match as manager in Liverpool's Europa League third qualifying round first leg 2–0 win over Macedonian side Rabotnički. In the second leg of the tie played at Anfield, Ngog scored the opening goal via a header and also won a penalty, which Gerrard scored, as Liverpool ran out 4–0 aggregate winners.

Ngog then scored again in Liverpool's opening match of the season at home to Arsenal in a 1–1 draw by turning past Thomas Vermaelen and rifling the ball into the top corner of the net past Arsenal goalkeeper Manuel Almunia. He was enjoying the best start to a Liverpool season before he was taken out of the squad that played West Bromwich Albion for Torres. After being left out of the game against Birmingham City, Ngog shot to fire again in the Europa League, scoring two in Liverpool's 4–1 victory over Steaua București. He scored an extra-time equaliser in the League Cup defeat to Northampton Town to take the tie to penalties, but missed his penalty in the shoot-out, and played the remaining 35 minutes in the Reds' frustrating 2–2 draw against Sunderland at Anfield. On 3 October, he replaced the injured Torres after just 10 minutes in their 2–1 home loss to Blackpool. On 24 October, he replaced Joe Cole in the 80th minute in Liverpool's 2–1 Premier League win at Anfield against Blackburn Rovers. He replaced Cole for the second time, in Liverpool's 1–0 Premier League win against Bolton Wanderers at the Reebok Stadium on 31 October. Ngog was praised by Sam Allardyce for the way in which his introduction changed the game for Liverpool, indirectly leading to their late winner. He continued to be an impact sub from the bench, following the departure of Torres, and the signings of Luis Suárez and Andy Carroll and often finding himself in the starting line-up.

=== Bolton Wanderers ===
On 31 August 2011, for a £4 million transfer fee, Liverpool announced that Ngog had completed a move to Bolton Wanderers in a three-year deal. Ngog made his first appearance for Bolton as a substitute for Kevin Davies in Bolton's 5–0 defeat to Manchester United at the Reebok Stadium on 10 September. His first goal for Bolton Wanderers came in Bolton's 3–1 win against Wigan Athletic at the DW Stadium on 15 October. Fulham made an unsuccessful £3 million bid for him in August 2012.

=== Swansea City ===
On 27 January 2014, Ngog joined Premier League club Swansea City until the end of the season, signing for an undisclosed fee. He made his debut on 1 February as a substitute for Nathan Dyer in a 2–0 away defeat to West Ham United.

=== Reims ===
On 1 September 2014, Ngog ended his six-year spell in the English leagues after signing a two-year contract with Ligue 1 outfit Reims.

=== Panionios ===
On 12 August 2016, Super League Greece club Panionios announced that they had signed Ngog for an undisclosed fee.

=== Ross County ===
On 23 January 2018, Ngog joined Ross County of the Scottish Premiership on a deal until the end of the 2017–18 season. The Frenchman reunited with Owen Coyle, who had managed him at Bolton Wanderers. He scored his first goal for the club in a 2–1 loss to Rangers on 28 January 2018.

=== Budapest Honvéd ===
In August 2018, Ngog joined Hungarian club Budapest Honvéd. On 25 August, he scored seven minutes into his debut against Debrecen.

=== Žalgiris and early retirement ===
In February 2020, Ngog became a member of Lithuanian A League side FK Žalgiris.

On 21 June 2020, Žalgiris announced that Ngog had retired from professional football at the age of 31.

=== Return to Panionios ===
In October 2022, Ngog returned to action, signing for Greek third tier club Panionios, returning to Greece after five years.

== International career ==
In November 2009, Ngog was approached to play for Cameroon, despite having already represented France at youth levels. The then Liverpool striker said: "I have had contact with the Cameroonian federation. Now I need some time to think about things. I'm very flattered." In February 2010, with Cameroon preparing for the 2010 World Cup, Cameroon's Minister of Sports, Michel Zoah, met with Ngog's father on two occasions to try and convince the player to switch allegiances. A few months later, in May, Ngog was not included in Cameroon's preliminary squad for the World Cup. When asked why, Cameroon coach Paul Le Guen said that Ngog had insisted on a starting spot with the Indomitable Lions. However, Ngog refuted the claims.

== Career statistics ==
Appearances and goals by club, season and competition
Club	Season	League			National Cup		League Cup		Europe		Other		Total	
Club	Season	Division	Apps	Goals	Apps	Goals	Apps	Goals	Apps	Goals	Apps	Goals	Apps	Goals
Paris Saint-Germain	2006–07	Ligue 1	4	0	1	0	0	0	1	0	—		6	0
Paris Saint-Germain	2007–08	Ligue 1	14	1	4	0	1	2	—		—		19	3
Paris Saint-Germain	Total		18	1	5	0	1	2	1	0	—		25	3
Liverpool	2008–09	Premier League	14	2	0	0	2	0	3	1	—		19	3
Liverpool	2009–10	Premier League	24	5	2	0	2	1	9	2	—		37	8
Liverpool	2010–11	Premier League	25	2	1	0	1	1	11	5	—		38	8
Liverpool	Total		63	9	3	0	5	2	23	8	—		94	19
Bolton Wanderers	2011–12	Premier League	33	3	4	1	2	0	—		—		39	4
Bolton Wanderers	2012–13	Championship	31	8	2	0	0	0	—		—		33	8
Bolton Wanderers	2013–14	Championship	17	3	1	1	1	0	—		—		19	4
Bolton Wanderers	Total		81	14	7	2	3	0	—		—		91	16
Swansea City	2013–14	Premier League	3	0	0	0	0	0	0	0	—		3	0
Reims	2014–15	Ligue 1	28	7	2	0	0	0	—		—		30	7
Reims	2015–16	Ligue 1	16	3	1	0	1	0	—		—		18	3
Reims	Total		44	10	3	0	1	0	—		—		48	10
Panionios	2016–17	Super League Greece	13	1	3	2	—		—		—		16	3
Ross County	2017–18	Scottish Premiership	10	1	0	0	0	0	—		—		10	1
Budapest Honvéd	2018–19	Nemzeti Bajnokság I	23	6	8	6	0	0	—		—		31	12
Budapest Honvéd	2019–20	Nemzeti Bajnokság I	5	2	1	0	0	0	4	1	—		10	3
Budapest Honvéd	Total		28	8	9	6	0	0	4	1	—		41	15
Žalgiris	2020	A Lyga	2	1	0	0	—		0	0	1	0	3	1
Career total			262	45	30	10	10	4	28	9	1	0	331	68

== Honours ==
Paris Saint-Germain

- Coupe de la Ligue: 2007–08

Žalgiris

- Lithuanian Supercup: 2020
