= Tomáš Pilík =

Czech footballer

Personal information
- Date of birth: 20 December 1988 (age 37)
- Place of birth: Příbram, Czechoslovakia
- Height: 1.85 m (6 ft 1 in)
- Position: Midfielder

Youth career
- 1995–1999: Sparta Luny
- 1999–2004: Marila Příbram

Senior career*
Years	Team	Apps	(Gls)
2004–2010	Příbram	55	(3)
2008–2009	→ Ústí nad Labem (loan)	22	(2)
2010	Banik Ostrava	13	(0)
2011–2017	Příbram	175	(21)
2017–2018	Zbrojovka Brno	22	(2)
2018–2019	Budapest Honvéd	8	(0)
2019–2020	Jablonec	37	(0)
2020–2022	Příbram	64	(13)

International career
2003–2004	Czech Republic U16	13	(0)
2004–2005	Czech Republic U17	17	(3)
2005–2006	Czech Republic U18	11	(0)
2006	Czech Republic U19	2	(0)
- * Club domestic league appearances and goals as of 19:11, 31 January 2021 (CET)

Tomáš Pilík (born 20 December 1988 in Příbram) is a professional Czech footballer, who played for 1. FK Příbram.

At the age of just 15 years and 343 days, Pilík made his Czech First League debut for Příbram in a match against Blšany, making him the second-youngest player in the history of the league after Pavel Mezlík.

In an August 2005 2–1 win against Brno, Pilík scored his first Czech First League goal at the age of 16, becoming the youngest goal scorer in league history to date.
