= Bőny =

- Flag Coat of arms

- Location within Hungary
- Coordinates: 47°39′0″N 17°52′11″E
- Country: Hungary
- County: Győr-Moson-Sopron

Area
  - Total: 50.42 km^{2} (19.47 sq mi)

Population (2004)
  - Total: 2,224
  - Density: 44.1/km^{2} (114/sq mi)
- Time zone: UTC+1 (CET)
  - Summer (DST): UTC+2 (CEST)
- Postal code: 9073
- Area code: 96
- Motorways: M1
- Distance from Budapest: 107 km (66 mi) East

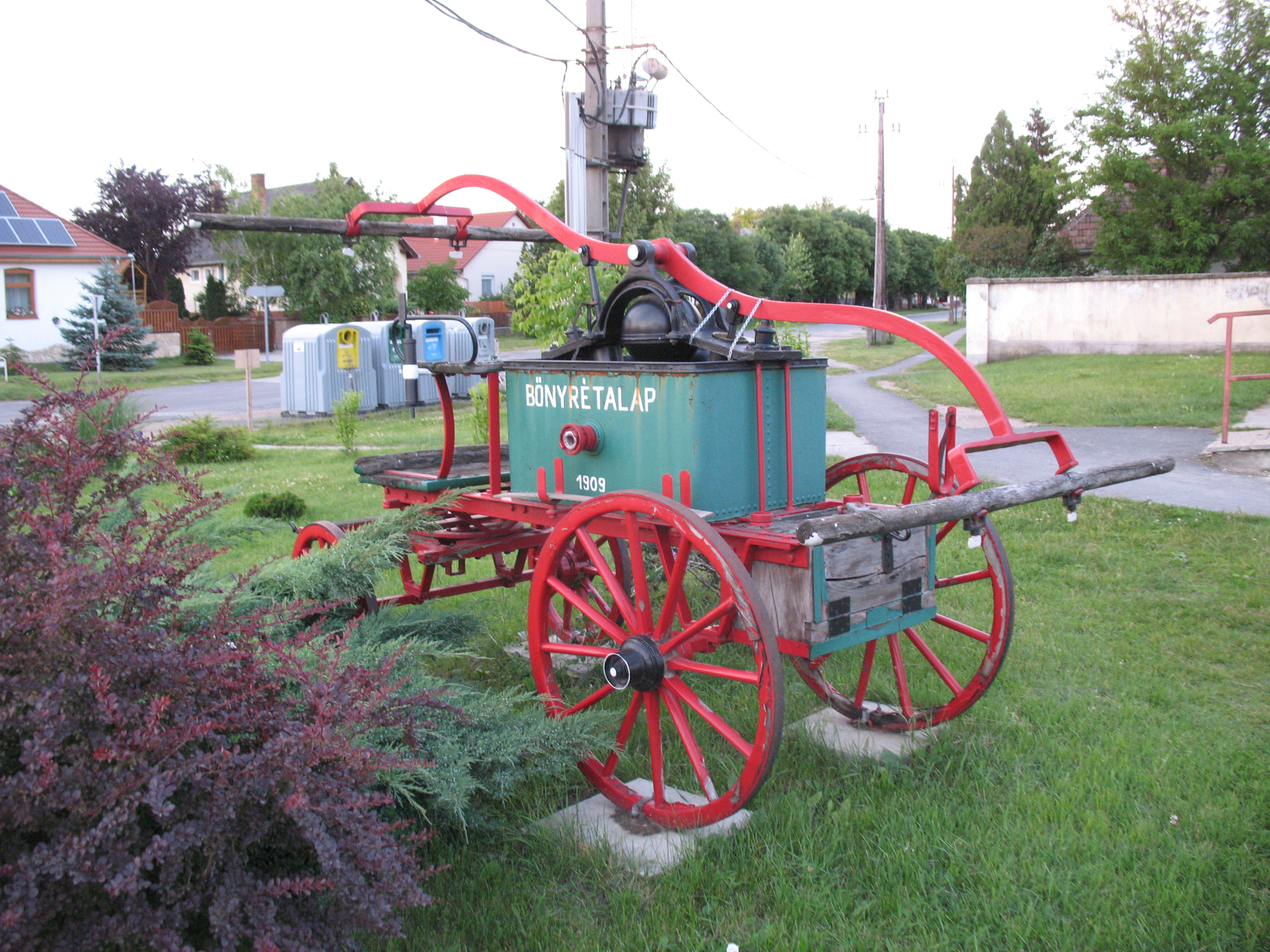
Bőny

Bőny is a village in Győr-Moson-Sopron county, Hungary.

== Location, transportation, and climate ==
Bőny is a village in northwest Hungary, located 19 km from the city of Győr. The village is situated in the eastern corner of Győr-Moson-Sopron county near the Komárom-Esztergom county border. The M1 highway passes about 8 km west and 5 km north of Bőny. The village has no rail link. The nearest railway station is located in Győr. The village is 11 km away from Bábolna city.

The village's climate is very continental.

== History and Present-day Life ==
The first habitation of the area can be traced to the Neolithic period. Bronze Age tools have been found in the area. The area was also populated during the Roman period.

The name "Bőny" dates back to a charter issued in 1235. The town's name probably derives from a personal name, of Turkish origin and meaning "plenty," which is believed to represent a family estate in the region. In 1300 the Cseszneky family owned village.

The St. Archangel Michael church, a circular structure, was built in 1391.

The Turkish occupation was one of the most difficult periods for the settlement. In the late 1700s, work began to unite a number of smaller settlements in the region.

An outstanding period in the history of the village was the 1848-49 revolution and war of independence.

In 1959, Bőny was a "socialist village".

In Bőny today, all walks of life are bound to nearby Győr. The majority of the working population commutes to Győr industrial plants.

The settlement is a member of the Bakonyér Local Government Association.

== Attractions ==
- Bothmer mansion (located in the village hall)
- Lutheran Church
- Reformed Church
- The Roman Catholic Church
- War memorial
- World War II soldier graves
- Jewish cemetery
