= Jordan Henderson =

English footballer (born 1990)

Jordan Henderson MBE
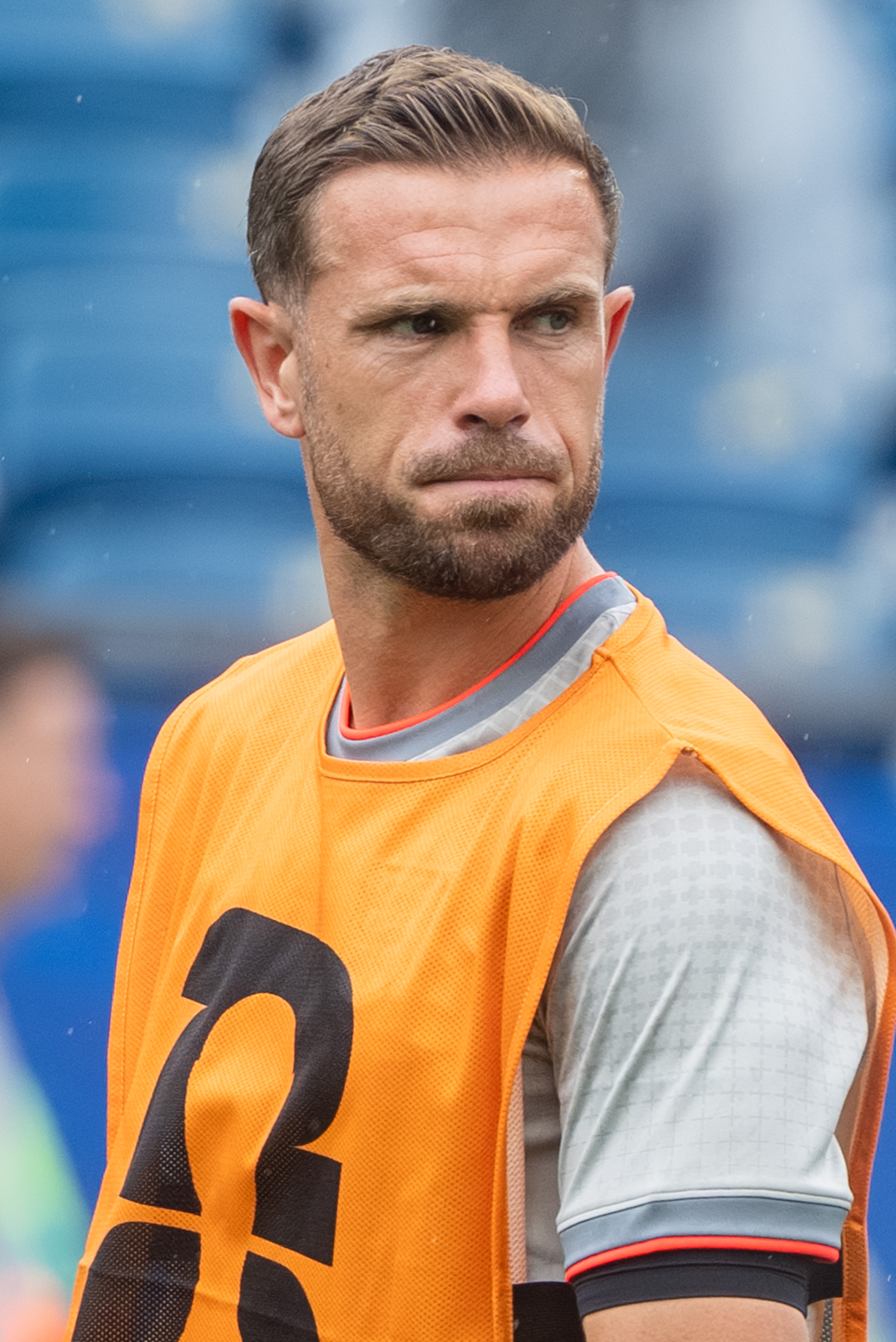
- Henderson with England in 2026

Personal information
- Full name: Jordan Brian Henderson
- Date of birth: 17 June 1990 (age 36)
- Place of birth: Sunderland, Tyne and Wear, England
- Height: 6 ft 0 in (1.83 m)
- Position: Midfielder

Team information
- Current team: Chelsea
- Number: 14

Youth career
- 1998–2008: Sunderland

Senior career*
Years	Team	Apps	(Gls)
2008–2011	Sunderland	71	(4)
2009	→ Coventry City (loan)	10	(1)
2011–2023	Liverpool	360	(29)
2023–2024	Al-Ettifaq	17	(0)
2024–2025	Ajax	37	(1)
2025–2026	Brentford	32	(1)
2026–	Chelsea	6	(2)

International career^{‡}
2009	England U19	1	(0)
2009	England U20	1	(0)
2010–2013	England U21	27	(4)
2010–	England	91	(3)
Medal record
Men's football
Representing England
FIFA World Cup
Third place	2026 Canada–Mexico–US
UEFA European Championship
Runner-up	2020 Europe
UEFA Nations League
Third place	2019 Portugal
- * Club domestic league appearances and goals as of 20:32, 21 November 2026 (UTC) ‡ National team caps and goals as of 23:05, 27 June 2026 (UTC)

Jordan Brian Henderson (born 17 June 1990) is an English professional footballer who plays as a midfielder for Premier League club Chelsea and the England national team. He is known for his leadership, versatility, and physicality.

Henderson joined the Sunderland Academy at the age of eight, making his first-team debut a decade later in November 2008. He spent six months on loan at Coventry City in 2009, before returning to Sunderland. In 2011, Henderson signed for Liverpool, winning his first trophy with the club, the League Cup, one year later. Appointed Liverpool captain in 2015, Henderson won the UEFA Champions League, the UEFA Super Cup and the FIFA Club World Cup in 2019, and in 2020 led his team to the Premier League title. For his performances in the title-winning season, Henderson was named FWA Footballer of the Year. In 2022, he won the FA Cup and the EFL Cup with Liverpool. He left Liverpool in 2023 and subsequently played for Al-Ettifaq and Ajax. In 2025, he returned to the Premier League after signing for Brentford.

An England international, Henderson has over 90 appearances for his country since his debut in 2010. He has appeared at seven international tournaments with England, the 2012, 2016 and 2020 UEFA European Championships and the 2014, 2018, 2022, and 2026 FIFA World Cups. He was the first player to win the England Player of the Year award at both the U21 and senior level.

== Early life ==
Jordan Brian Henderson was born on 17 June 1990 in Sunderland, Tyne and Wear, and joined the youth system of his hometown club Sunderland aged eight. Henderson studied at Farringdon Community Sports College.

== Club career ==
=== Sunderland ===
==== 2008–2009: Early career and loan to Coventry City ====
Henderson signed a professional contract with Sunderland on 1 July 2008. He made his first-team debut on 1 November in a 5–0 away defeat to Chelsea in the Premier League, in which he came on as a half-time substitute. He then made his first Sunderland start and home debut against Blackburn Rovers in the League Cup the following month.

In January 2009, Henderson joined Championship club Coventry City on a one-month loan. He made his Coventry debut in a 2–1 defeat to Derby County. Henderson's loan to Coventry was extended until the end of the season, and he scored the first senior goal of his career on 28 February 2009 against Norwich City. After picking up an injury, a fracture to the fifth metatarsal bone in his foot, he returned to Sunderland in April 2009.

==== 2009–2011: Return to Sunderland ====
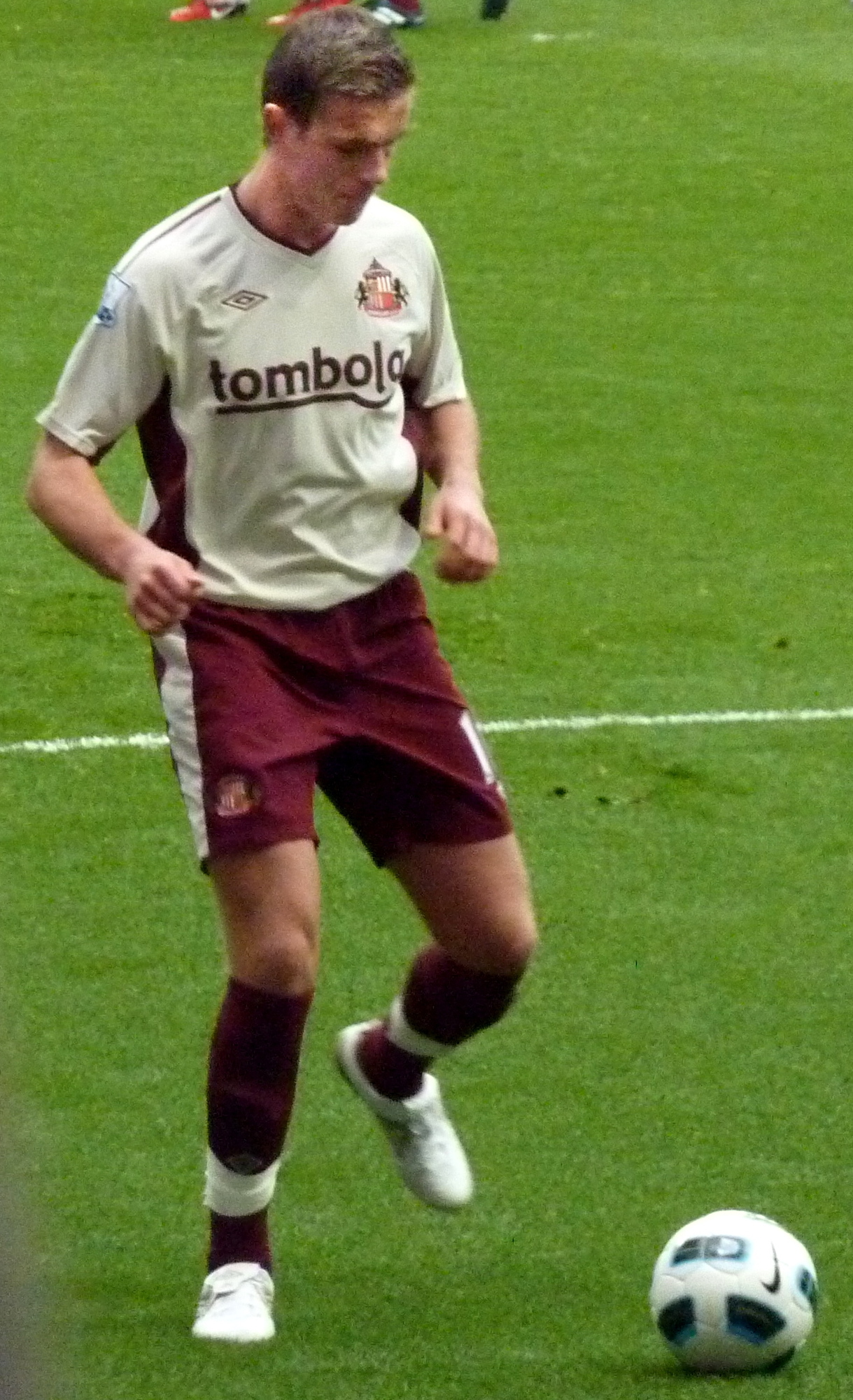
Henderson playing for Sunderland in 2011

In the 2009–10 season, Henderson broke into the Sunderland first team and made 38 appearances, scoring 2 goals. He scored his first senior goal for the club against Birmingham City in the League Cup third round. He then went on to score his first Premier League goal against Manchester City on 19 December 2009.

Henderson spent the majority of the season on the right side of midfield but played centrally in the absence of Lee Cattermole; his versatility and consistency earned him a new five-year contract on 23 April 2010, keeping him with the club until 2015. He also went on to win the Sunderland Young Player of the Year award for the 2009–10 season.

Henderson was a major part of the team during the 2010–11 season making 39 appearances and scoring 3 goals, including his first league double, on 23 April at home to Wigan Athletic. On 13 January 2011, Henderson was listed on the official FIFA website as one of 13 young players to watch in 2011. He was named Sunderland's Young Player of the Year for the second season running.

=== Liverpool ===
==== 2011–2015: Emergence and first successes ====
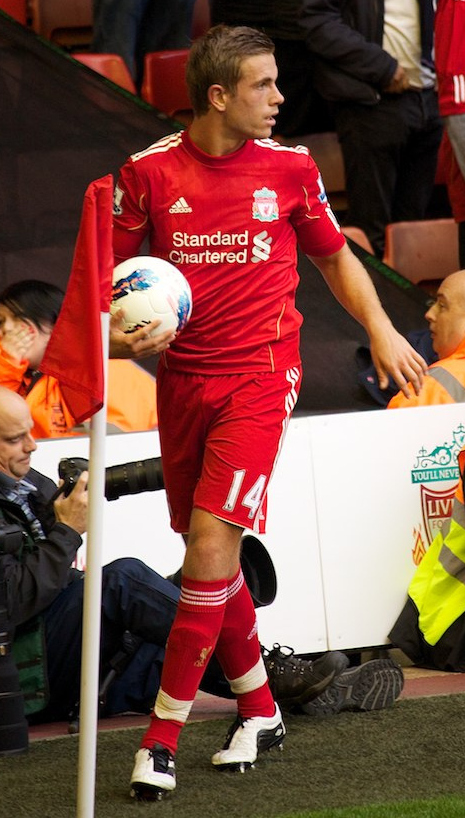
Henderson playing for Liverpool in 2011

On 9 June 2011, Henderson was transferred to Liverpool for an undisclosed fee thought to be between £16 and £20 million. He made his debut in Liverpool's first match of the 2011–12 Premier League, a 1–1 draw against his former club Sunderland where he was given a mixed reception by Sunderland fans. On 27 August, Henderson scored his first goal for Liverpool in a Premier League fixture at Anfield against Bolton Wanderers. On 26 February 2012, Henderson started on the right of midfield in Liverpool's 2012 League Cup final victory over Cardiff City before being substituted in the 58th minute. On 5 May, he played the full 90 minutes as Liverpool were beaten 2–1 by Chelsea in the 2012 FA Cup final. Henderson ended the 2011–12 season with 2 goals from 48 appearances.

In August 2012, Henderson was told he could be signed by Fulham by new manager Brendan Rodgers, but this was rejected by the player. He went on to score his first European goal for Liverpool on 6 December, with the winner against Udinese in the UEFA Europa League as the Reds qualified for the last 32.

Henderson established himself as a regular member of the Liverpool team in the 2013–14 season, playing in 40 matches and scoring 5 goals. On 29 September 2013, he made his 100th appearance for the club as Liverpool won 1–3 at Sunderland.

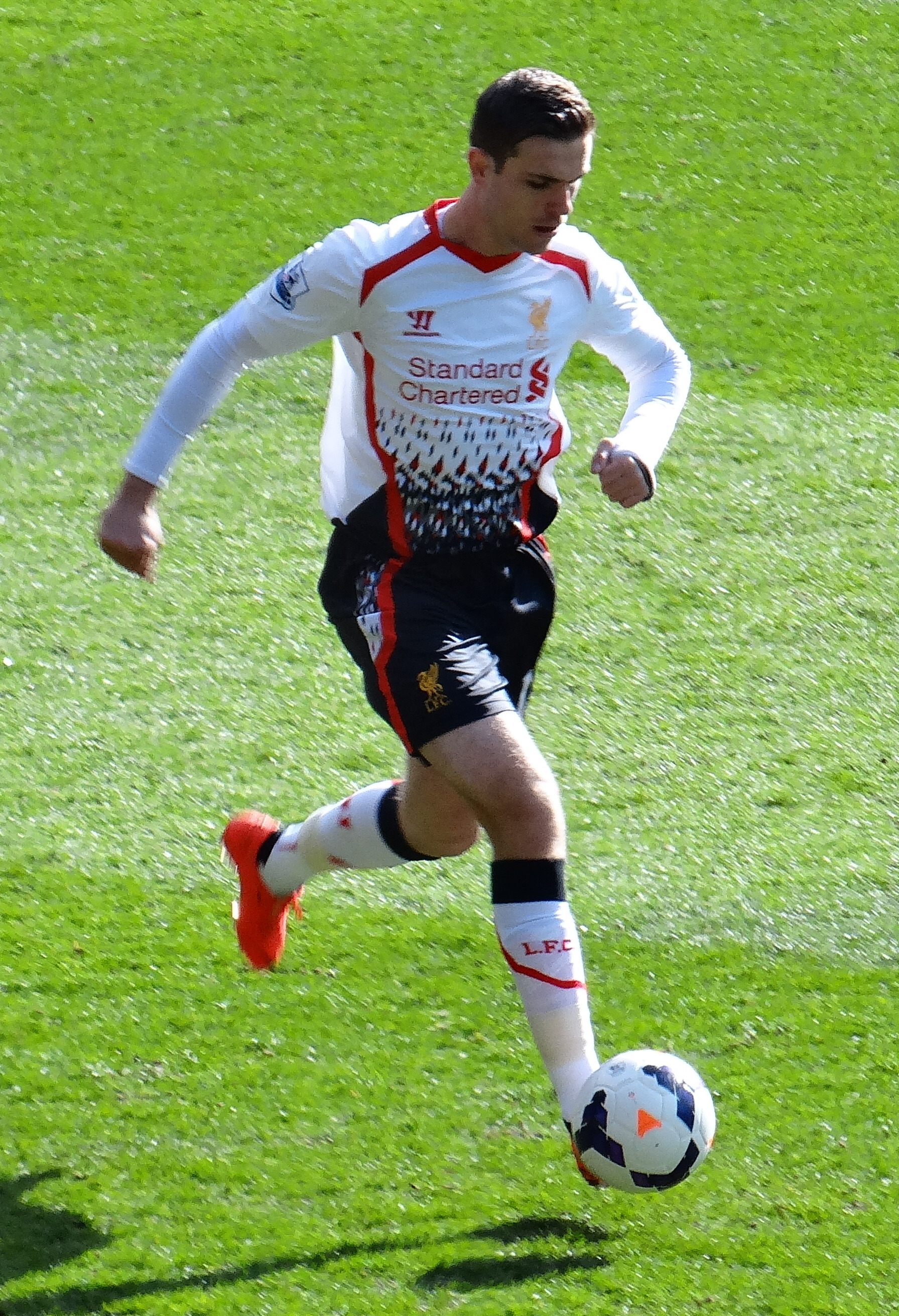
Henderson on the ball for Liverpool in 2014

On 13 April 2014, he received his first career red card for a dangerous sliding tackle on Samir Nasri in a 3–2 win over Manchester City, resulting in a three-match ban that meant he would miss three of Liverpool's last four matches; without Henderson, Liverpool lost 0–2 in a home game against Chelsea and drew 3–3 with Crystal Palace, losing a 3–0 lead in just 15 minutes before the final whistle. Failure to win any of those games meant that by the time of Henderson's return from suspension, Liverpool had already been overtaken in first place by Manchester City. On 11 May 2014, the final match day of the competition, he started in Liverpool's 2–1 home win over Newcastle United only to finish second as Manchester City claimed the league title in their concurrent game.

Henderson started the 2014–15 season in good form, providing two assists in Liverpool's first three league matches, and was named as the club's vice-captain following the departure of Daniel Agger. On 29 November, Henderson started as captain for the first time for Liverpool in the Premier League against Stoke City as Steven Gerrard was an unused substitute. On 2 December, Henderson marked his 150th appearance for the club by scoring the third goal in a 3–1 win against Leicester City to confirm the win. Henderson started many Liverpool matches as captain as Gerrard was out injured or being rested on the bench. On 23 April, Henderson signed a five-year contract extension at Liverpool worth £100,000 a week.

==== 2015–2021: Club captain and further achievements ====
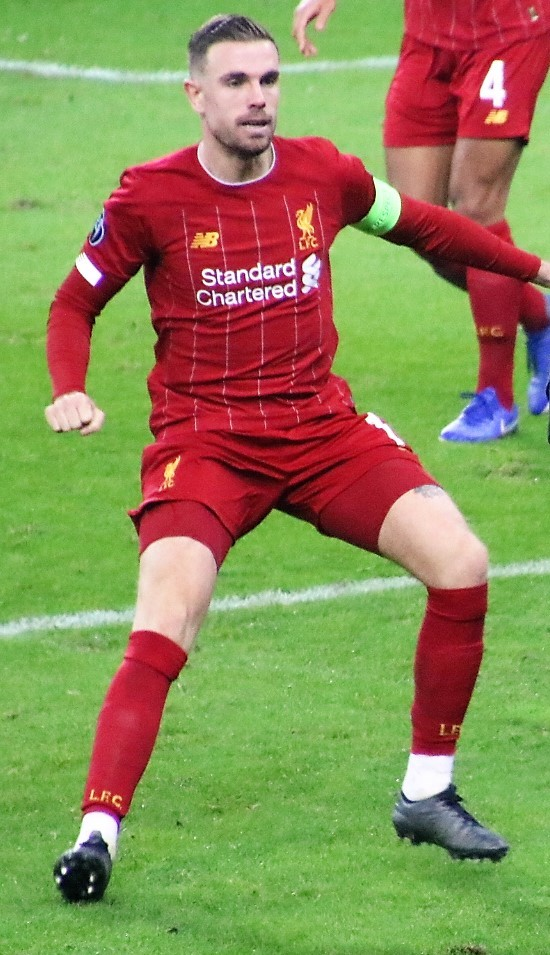
Henderson playing for Liverpool in 2020

Following the departure of Gerrard in June 2015, Henderson was made captain of Liverpool. After aggravating a heel injury, Henderson underwent surgery, but broke a bone in his right foot before he could rejoin the starting line-up. It was reported that Henderson's heel problems stemmed from the incurable condition known as plantar fasciitis. The injury meant that he missed the arrival of manager Jürgen Klopp after Rodgers was dismissed. He returned to first-team football on 29 November 2015 against Swansea City. He scored on his first start since his injury, in a 2–2 home draw with West Bromwich Albion on 13 December 2015. A knee injury sustained during Liverpool's Europa League first leg match with Borussia Dortmund ruled him out until the end of the season. Henderson ended the 2015–16 season with 26 appearances and 2 goals.

Henderson started the 2016–17 season with regular appearances in the starting eleven and on 16 September scored with a 25-yard shot in a 2–1 away win over Chelsea. The strike earned him the Premier League Goal of the Month award for the month of September. Henderson ended the season with 27 appearances, scoring 1 goal. Henderson spent the 2017–18 season as a first-team regular, and he scored his only goal of the season on 23 September 2017, with a winner against Leicester City in a 3–2 win. On 15 August 2017, Henderson captained Liverpool in the UEFA Champions League for the first time, against German team 1899 Hoffenheim. The club went all the way to the final, ultimately being defeated 3–1 by Real Madrid at the Olympic Stadium in Kyiv. Henderson ended the 2017–18 season with 41 appearances in all competitions, scoring 1 goal.

Henderson signed a new five-year deal at Liverpool in 2018 after leading the club to its first Champions League final in over a decade. After signing the contract, Henderson emphasised his intentions to remain at Liverpool for as long as possible and ideally the remainder of his career. On 24 November, Henderson was sent off after receiving a second yellow card in a 3–0 win against Watford, meaning he would miss the Merseyside derby on 2 December.

On 7 May 2019, Henderson played through pain after suffering a first-half knee injury to captain Liverpool to qualification for their second Champions League final in as many seasons with a 4–3 aggregate semi-final victory over Barcelona, a 4–0 victory on the night. Liverpool began the match with a 0–3 deficit to overcome and key players missing, and the comeback is considered to be one of the best in the history of the competition. On 1 June 2019, Henderson captained Liverpool in a 2–0 victory over Tottenham Hotspur in the 2019 Champions League final in Madrid, becoming the fifth Liverpool captain to lift the Champions League trophy, the club's sixth overall. Liverpool then followed this up by winning the 2019 UEFA Super Cup, beating Chelsea on penalties. On 21 December 2019, Henderson led Liverpool to their first FIFA Club World Cup title after beating 2019 Copa Libertadores winners Flamengo 1–0 after extra time in the final in Doha, making them the only English club to win the treble of continental trophies.

Liverpool finished the 2018–19 season with one of the highest points totals in English top-flight history, but finished in 2nd place one point behind champions Manchester City. Liverpool's good form continued into the following season, and after a break caused by the COVID-19 pandemic, Henderson led Liverpool to their first league title in 30 years on 25 June 2020. Often credited for heroic and passionate performances throughout the league-winning season, Henderson was named the FWA Footballer of the Year for 2020 along with being named a finalist for the PFA Players' Player of the Year. Having featured in 40 games during the 2019–20 season, Henderson entered the list of top 40 all-time Liverpool appearance makers at the end of the campaign.

==== 2021–2023: Domestic double and FA Community Shield ====
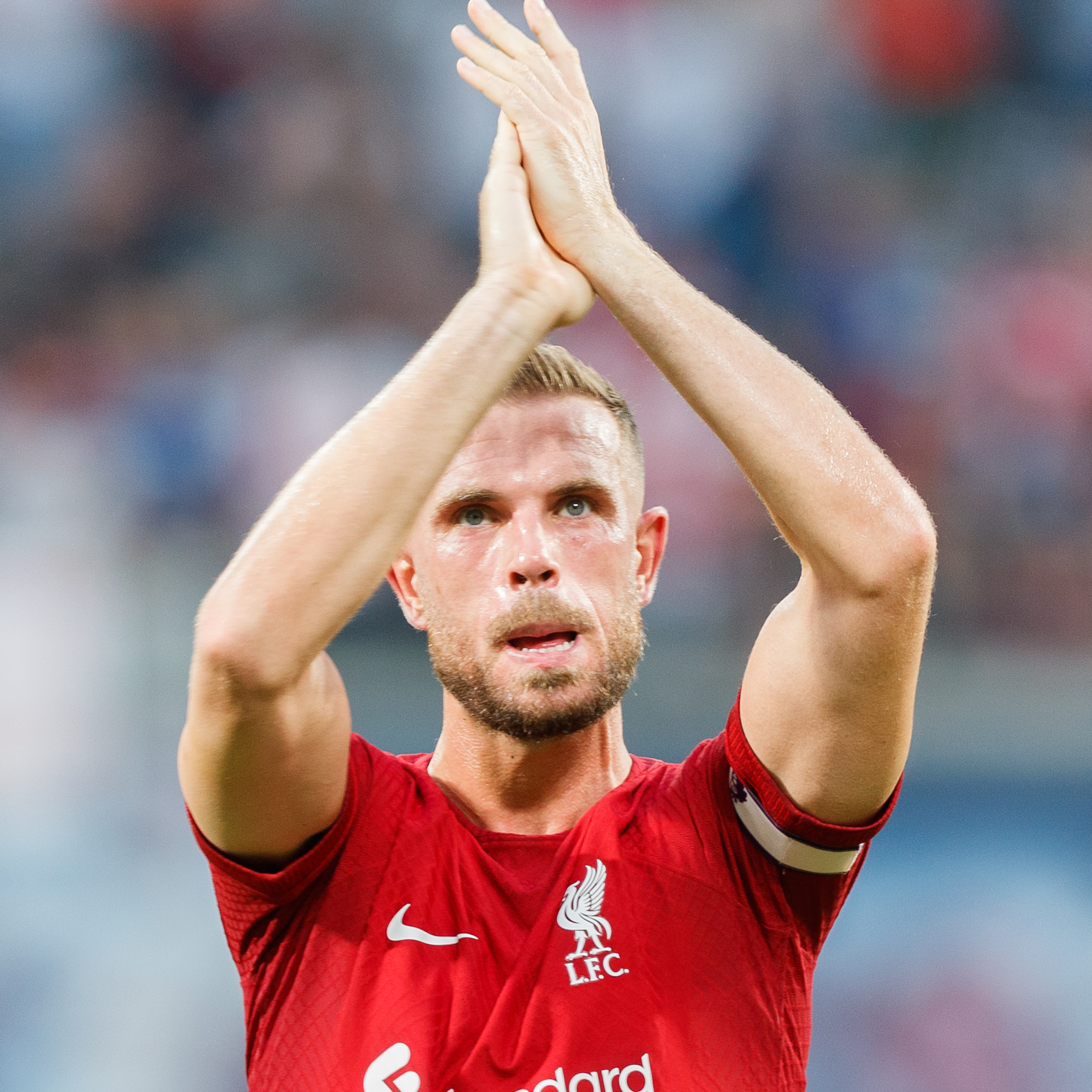
Henderson with Liverpool in 2022

On 31 August 2021, Henderson signed a new long-term contract with Liverpool. He scored his first Champions League goal in seven years on 15 September, with the winner in the opening group stage match, a 3–2 home victory over AC Milan. On 24 October, he captained Liverpool to a 5–0 away victory against Manchester United, with his defence splitting pass putting Mohamed Salah through to score Liverpool's fifth. Henderson made his 300th Premier League appearance for Liverpool on 8 November against West Ham United.

On 14 May 2022, Henderson became the first Liverpool captain to win six different trophies after winning the 2021–22 FA Cup. Liverpool just missed out on the chance to achieve a historic quadruple, coming second in the 2021–22 Premier League and Champions League, but winning both the EFL Cup and FA Cup. At the end of the 2022–23 season, Liverpool narrowly missed out on Champions League qualification. On 26 July 2023, Henderson confirmed he would be leaving Liverpool after 12 years.

=== Al-Ettifaq ===
On 27 July 2023, Henderson signed for Saudi Pro League club Al-Ettifaq for a reported transfer fee of £12 million. Al-Ettifaq were managed by Steven Gerrard, Henderson's compatriot and former teammate at Liverpool. He made his debut on 14 August in a 2–1 win against Al-Nassr in the league. On 18 January 2024, Henderson left Al-Ettifaq after his contract was mutually terminated.

=== Ajax ===
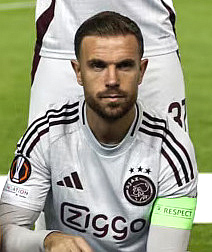
Henderson with Ajax in 2024

That same day, Henderson signed for Eredivisie club Ajax on a two-and-a-half-year contract. He made his debut on 3 February in a 1–1 draw with PSV at the Johan Cruyff Arena.

On 18 May 2025, Henderson scored his first and only goal for Ajax in a 2–0 win over Twente, as his side narrowly missed out on the Eredivisie title. He left Ajax and became a free agent on 9 July.

=== Brentford ===
On 15 July 2025, Henderson returned to England, signing for Premier League club Brentford on a two-year contract. He made his debut for the club on 17 August, coming on as a substitute in a 3–1 away loss to Nottingham Forest. On 14 December, he scored his first goal for Brentford in a 1–1 draw against Leeds United. On 29 July 2026, Henderson departed Brentford after his contract was mutually terminated.

=== Chelsea ===
On 3 August 2026, Henderson joined Chelsea on a free transfer, signing a two-year contract. He made his debut on 18 September against former club Brentford in the Premier League, playing the full match in Chelsea's 3–0 defeat at the Brentford Community Stadium. On 10 October, Henderson scored his first goals for Chelsea, a brace in a 5–1 league victory over Bournemouth at Stamford Bridge.

== International career ==
=== Youth ===
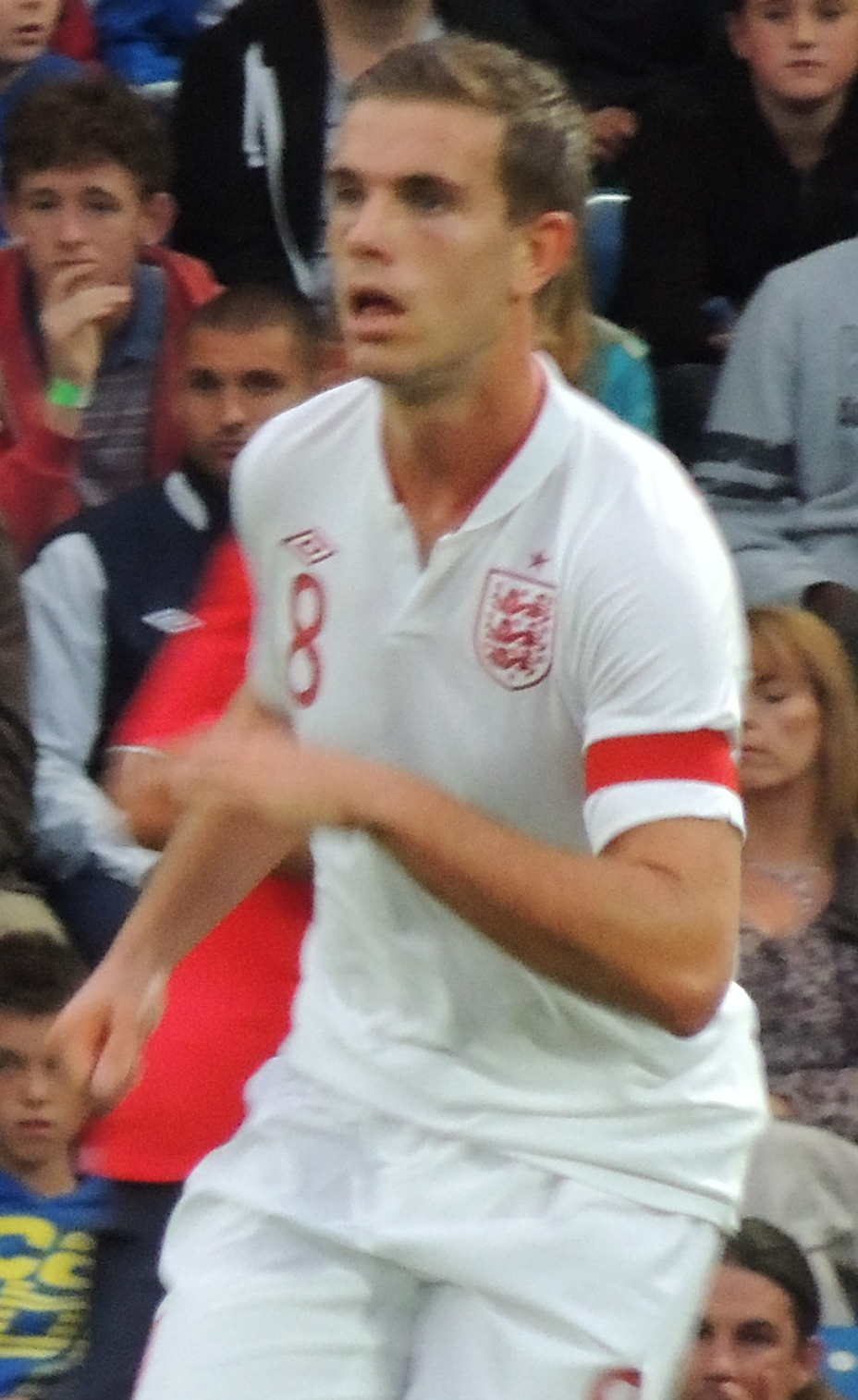
Henderson playing for England U21 in 2012

Henderson made his debut for the under-19s against the Czech Republic in 2009, before breaking into Stuart Pearce's under-21 squad. He scored his first goal in an England shirt in the European U21 Championship play-offs against Romania, hitting a volley from outside the box to give England the lead.

Henderson was selected in the England U21 squad for the 2011 European Championship. However, England were knocked out in the group stage. He captained the England U21 team in a 6–0 win over Azerbaijan U21 on 1 September 2011, scoring one goal in the Euro 2013 qualifier. He then scored his fourth under-21 goal in a 2–1 win away at Norway, maintaining England's 100% record in Euro 2013 qualification. On 3 February 2013, Henderson was named the England U21 Player of the Year in the inaugural year of the award. He captained the under-21 team at the 2013 UEFA European Under-21 Championship.

=== Senior ===
On 11 November 2010, Henderson was omitted from England's U21 squad for their friendly with Germany, instead receiving his first call up to the senior England squad on 17 November for their friendly against France. He made his debut in the match, playing from the start in central midfield alongside Steven Gerrard.

Initially named as a standby player, Henderson was called up to the England UEFA Euro 2012 squad to replace the injured Frank Lampard. He featured in England's first match of the tournament against France, coming on as a substitute in the 78th minute for Scott Parker, and again featured as a substitute, coming on during extra-time, in England's quarter-final penalty shoot-out defeat to Italy.

Henderson was selected in Roy Hodgson's 23-man squad to travel to Brazil for the 2014 FIFA World Cup. He started in England's opening two World Cup group matches, 2–1 defeats to Italy in Manaus, and Uruguay in São Paulo.

Henderson was also selected in England's UEFA Euro 2016 squad by Hodgson. He only played one match, playing the full 90 minutes in the final group match against Slovakia which ended 0–0 as England finished second in their group.

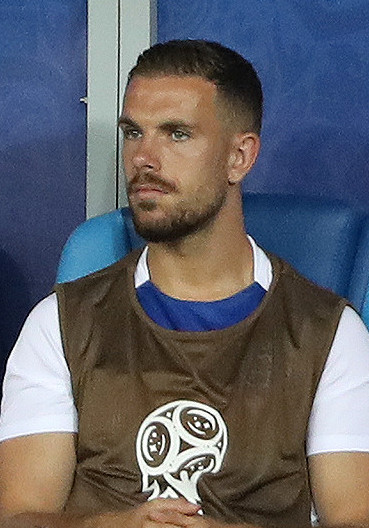
Henderson with England at the 2018 FIFA World Cup

He was named in the England squad for the 2018 FIFA World Cup in Russia. In England's round of 16 match against Colombia, Henderson was the only Three Lions player to miss a spot-kick as the match went to penalties. England still won though, 4–3, and made it to the semi-finals. The following year, after helping his nation finish third at the inaugural UEFA Nations League and qualify for UEFA Euro 2020, Henderson was named England Player of the Year, in the process becoming the first player to win the award at both U21 and senior level.

Henderson's first ever international goal came on 3 July 2021 in the UEFA Euro 2020 quarter-final game against Ukraine, scoring England's last goal with a header of the 4–0 win as a substitute. In the final against Italy on 11 July, Henderson was a 74th minute substitute before being replaced himself by Marcus Rashford at the end of extra time as England finished as runners-up, losing to Italy on penalties.

In November 2022, Henderson was named in England's 26-man squad for the 2022 World Cup in Qatar. He scored his first World Cup goal after a link-up play with Jude Bellingham in the round of 16 against Senegal.

Having not featured in the England squad since November 2023, Henderson was not named to the squad for the UEFA Euro 2024 tournament or for any matches in 2024. Henderson was recalled to the squad in March 2025 for fixtures against Albania and Latvia.

Henderson playing for England at the 2026 FIFA World Cup

On 22 May 2026, Henderson was named in England's squad for the 2026 FIFA World Cup by head coach Thomas Tuchel, becoming the first English player to be selected for seven major international tournaments. On 27 June, he featured in his fourth World Cup as a substitute in a 2–0 victory over Panama, becoming the first English player to achieve this feat. On 5 July, following England's 3–2 win over Mexico in the round of 16 in which he was an unused substitute, Henderson was stretchered off and hospitalized with a wrist injury after jumping over a barrier and landing awkwardly on the pitch during the celebrations, ruling him out for the remainder of the tournament. However, in the quarterfinals against Norway six days later, he featured as an unused substitute for the match as England won 2–1, despite wearing an arm cast.

== Player profile ==
=== Style of play ===
Henderson usually plays as a box-to-box midfielder, although under Klopp he was mostly used as a defensive midfielder. With the arrival of Fabinho in 2018, Henderson moved back to his original "number 8" position as a central midfielder closer to the right side of the pitch, a role in which he excels the most. A versatile player, he has also been used in a more advanced midfield role on occasion, and even as a makeshift centre-back during periods of injury crisis among Liverpool's central defenders. He is widely regarded as a player with strong work ethic, bringing energy to the team. He is also noted for his leadership, versatility, and physicality.

Described as an "athletic and hardworking midfielder", Henderson developed his game during his time at Liverpool, evolving into a more complete player; in particular, former Liverpool player Danny Murphy noted that his passing range had increased, which allowed him to take on an increasingly more creative role for his team. Furthermore, he constantly presses high up the field whenever the opposition is in possession. Besides physical attributes and footballing skills, he has also been praised for his tactical intelligence, consistency, and his leadership both in and outside football. He is also known for his ability to win challenges, transition the ball forward, and make attacking runs from midfield to get into good offensive positions.

=== Reception ===
Although he received media criticism early in his career for being dispensable, he later drew praise from pundits for his ability to develop his game and establish himself as an essential player, with then-Flamengo manager Jorge Jesus describing him as the "best midfielder in the world in his position" following their encounter in the 2019 Club World Cup final. Liverpool coach Klopp described him as "exceptional" and "outstanding", while former Liverpool and England midfielder Steven Gerrard said about Henderson, "Teams can't function at Liverpool's level without a cog like Jordan Henderson."

== Personal life ==
Henderson is a Sunderland fan and attended the 2014 League Cup final with the Sunderland fans, while being a player at Liverpool. On the same day as being named Liverpool captain, it was announced he would also be featuring alongside Lionel Messi on the cover of the UK edition of FIFA 16.

Henderson and his wife Rebecca Burnett have three children. His father Brian, a former policeman and amateur footballer, survived oral cancer during Henderson's early Liverpool career and was later able to attend the 2019 Champions League final in Madrid.

In December 2020, Henderson responded to a fan on Twitter (now X) who said that the club had helped deal with his sexual orientation during his teenage years and early adulthood, stating that if wearing the Rainbow Laces armband as Premier League captain helped at least one person, it was progress. He further stated that "everyone is welcome at Liverpool Football Club", evoking positive reactions from fans and LGBT organisations. Kop Outs, the official LGBT Liverpool supporters group, said of Henderson's response as "an immensely important moment which touched a chord with all Reds fans".

During the COVID-19 pandemic in the United Kingdom, Henderson, as captain of Liverpool, contacted fellow Premier League captains to organise a COVID-19 fund that would raise millions of pounds for the National Health Service (NHS). His idea was for Premier League footballers to contribute to a fund for frontline NHS workers.

Henderson was appointed a Member of the Order of the British Empire (MBE) in the 2021 Birthday Honours for "services to Football and to Charity particularly during the Covid-19 Pandemic".

His autobiography, Jordan Henderson: The Autobiography, was released in October 2022.

In July 2023, Henderson was criticised for the move to Saudi Arabia with Al-Ettifaq in some quarters, having previously written in support of the LGBTQ+ community. The video released by Al-Ettifaq desaturated Henderson's rainbow armband to black and white. Former German midfielder Thomas Hitzlsperger, who announced he was gay after his playing career ended, posted on social media "I did believe for a while that [Henderson's] support for the [rainbow emoji] community would be genuine. Silly me." "I can understand the frustration [from the LGBTQ+ community]," Henderson later told The Athletic. He added, "I can understand the anger. I get it. All I can say around that is that I'm sorry that they feel like that. My intention was never, ever to hurt anyone. My intention has always been to help causes and communities where I felt like they have asked for my help." Hitzlsperger later added further criticism to Henderson and other players in his 2024 autobiography Mutproben.

While playing in Saudi Arabia, Henderson, manager Steven Gerrard and their families lived in nearby Bahrain.

Henderson studied for a Diploma in Football Business Management at the Professional Footballers' Association business school.

== Career statistics ==
=== Club ===
As of match played 21 November 2026

Appearances and goals by club, season and competition
Club	Season	League			National cup (Note: Includes FA Cup, King's Cup, KNVB Cup)		League cup (Note: Includes Football League/EFL Cup)		Continental		Other		Total	
Club	Season	Division	Apps	Goals	Apps	Goals	Apps	Goals	Apps	Goals	Apps	Goals	Apps	Goals
Sunderland	2008–09	Premier League	1	0	0	0	1	0	—		—		2	0
Sunderland	2009–10	Premier League	33	1	2	0	3	1	—		—		38	2
Sunderland	2010–11	Premier League	37	3	1	0	1	0	—		—		39	3
Sunderland	Total		71	4	3	0	5	1	—		—		79	5
Coventry City (loan)	2008–09	Championship	10	1	3	0	—		—		—		13	1
Liverpool	2011–12	Premier League	37	2	5	0	6	0	—		—		48	2
Liverpool	2012–13	Premier League	30	5	2	0	2	0	10 (Note: Appearances in UEFA Europa League)	1	—		44	6
Liverpool	2013–14	Premier League	35	4	3	0	2	1	—		—		40	5
Liverpool	2014–15	Premier League	37	6	7	0	4	0	6 (Note: Five appearances and one goal in UEFA Champions League, one appearance in UEFA Europa League)	1	—		54	7
Liverpool	2015–16	Premier League	17	2	0	0	3	0	6	0	—		26	2
Liverpool	2016–17	Premier League	24	1	0	0	3	0	—		—		27	1
Liverpool	2017–18	Premier League	27	1	1	0	1	0	12 (Note: Appearances in UEFA Champions League)	0	—		41	1
Liverpool	2018–19	Premier League	32	1	0	0	1	0	11	0	—		44	1
Liverpool	2019–20	Premier League	30	4	0	0	0	0	6	0	4 (Note: One appearance in FA Community Shield, one appearance in UEFA Super Cup, two appearances in FIFA Club World Cup)	0	40	4
Liverpool	2020–21	Premier League	21	1	1	0	0	0	6	0	0	0	28	1
Liverpool	2021–22	Premier League	35	2	5	0	5	0	12	1	—		57	3
Liverpool	2022–23	Premier League	35	0	2	0	1	0	4	0	1 (Note: Appearance in FA Community Shield)	0	43	0
Liverpool	Total		360	29	26	0	28	1	73	3	5	0	492	33
Al-Ettifaq	2023–24	Saudi Pro League	17	0	2	0	—		—		—		19	0
Ajax	2023–24	Eredivisie	9	0	—		—		3 (Note: Appearances in UEFA Europa Conference League)	0	—		12	0
Ajax	2024–25	Eredivisie	28	1	2	0	—		15	0	—		45	1
Ajax	Total		37	1	2	0	—		18	0	—		57	1
Brentford	2025–26	Premier League	32	1	2	0	0	0	—		—		34	1
Chelsea	2026–27	Premier League	6	2	0	0	1	0	—		—		7	2
Career total			533	38	38	0	34	2	91	3	5	0	701	43

=== International ===
As of match played 27 June 2026

Appearances and goals by national team and year
National team	Year	Apps	Goals
England	2010	1	0
England	2011	0	0
England	2012	4	0
England	2013	2	0
England	2014	11	0
England	2015	4	0
England	2016	10	0
England	2017	4	0
England	2018	12	0
England	2019	7	0
England	2020	3	0
England	2021	10	2
England	2022	6	1
England	2023	7	0
England	2024	0	0
England	2025	7	0
England	2026	3	0
Total		91	3

As of match played 6 June 2026
England score listed first, score column indicates score after each Henderson goal

List of international goals scored by Jordan Henderson
No.	Date	Venue	Cap	Opponent	Score	Result	Competition	Ref.
1	3 July 2021	Stadio Olimpico, Rome, Italy	62	Ukraine	4–0	4–0	UEFA Euro 2020	
2	12 November 2021	Wembley Stadium, London, England	68	Albania	3–0	5–0	2022 FIFA World Cup qualification	
3	4 December 2022	Al Bayt Stadium, Al Khor, Qatar	73	Senegal	1–0	3–0	2022 FIFA World Cup	

== Honours ==
Liverpool

- Premier League: 2019–20
- FA Cup: 2021–22; runner-up: 2011–12
- Football League/EFL Cup: 2011–12, 2021–22; runner-up: 2015–16
- FA Community Shield: 2022
- UEFA Champions League: 2018–19; runner-up: 2017–18, 2021–22
- UEFA Super Cup: 2019
- FIFA Club World Cup: 2019
- UEFA Europa League runner-up: 2015–16

England

- UEFA European Championship runner-up: 2020
- FIFA World Cup third place: 2026
- UEFA Nations League third place: 2018–19

Individual

- England U21 Player of the Year Award: 2012
- Liverpool Young Player of the Year: 2011–12
- Sunderland Young Player of the Year: 2009–10, 2010–11
- Premier League Goal of the Month: September 2016
- England Senior Men's Player of the Year: 2019
- FWA Footballer of the Year: 2019–20
- Liverpool Fans' Player of the Season: 2019–20
- PFA Team of the Year: 2019–20 Premier League
- ESM Team of the Year: 2019–20

Orders

- Member of the Order of the British Empire: 2021
