= 2011–12 Liverpool F.C. season =

English football club season

Liverpool
2011–12 season
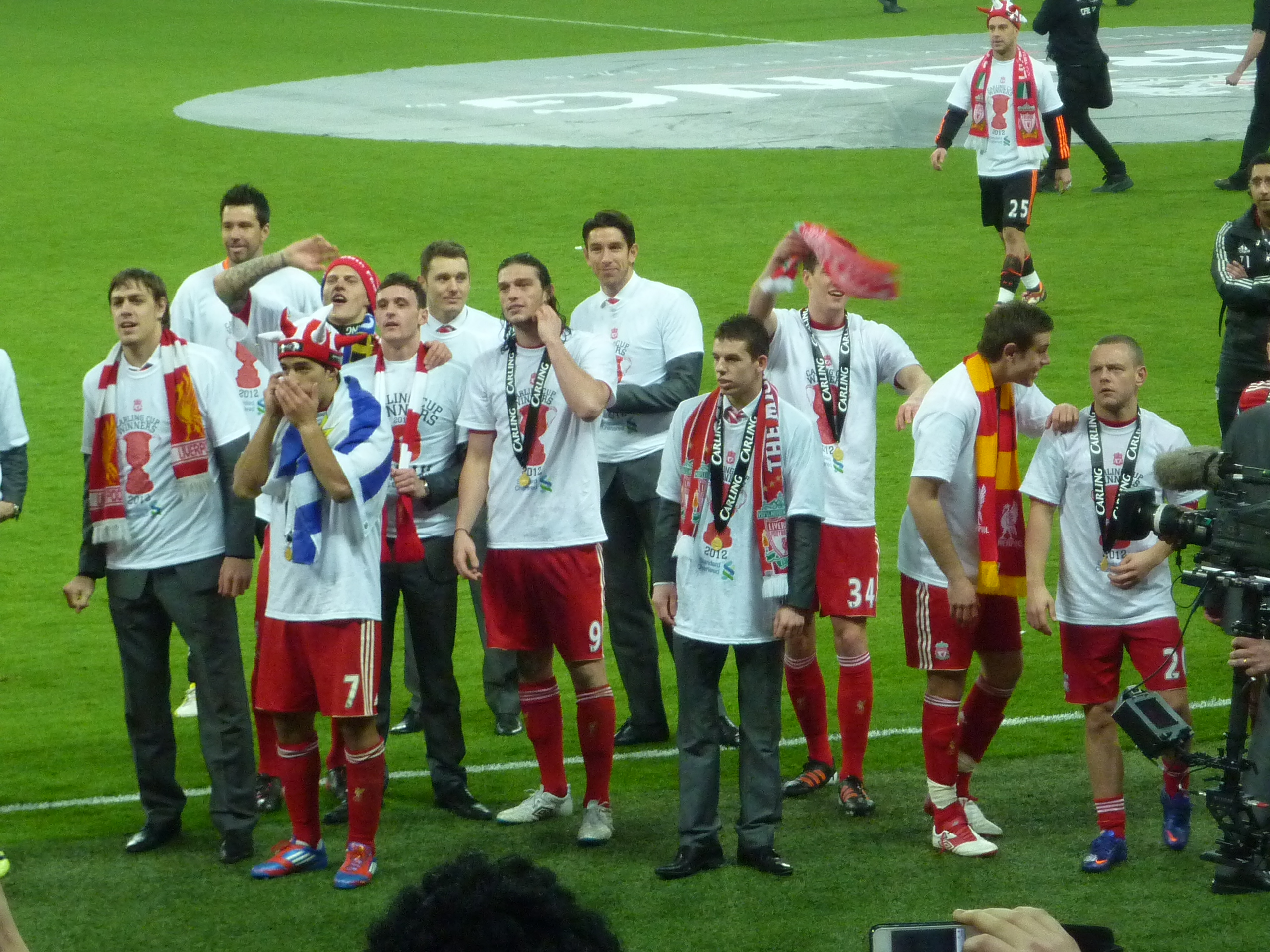
- Liverpool players after winning the 2012 Football League Cup Final
- Owner: Fenway Sports Group
- Chairman: Tom Werner
- Manager: Kenny Dalglish
- Stadium: Anfield
- Premier League: 8th
- FA Cup: Runners-up
- League Cup: Winners
- Top goalscorer: League: Luis Suárez (11); All: Luis Suárez (17)
Home colours	Away colours	Third colours

The 2011–12 season was the 120th season in Liverpool Football Club's existence, and their 50th consecutive year in the top flight of English football, but they were not participating in any UEFA competition for the first time since the 1999–2000 season.

Liverpool had mixed fortunes during the season; they enjoyed success in the domestic cups, winning the League Cup for a record eighth time—also their first trophy since 2006—and reached the FA Cup Final, where they lost to Chelsea. By virtue of winning the League Cup, Liverpool qualified for the 2012–13 UEFA Europa League. The club's league form, however, was indifferent and they finished eighth, their joint-lowest Premier League finish since finishing eighth in 1994, resulting in Kenny Dalglish being relieved of his duties on 16 May 2012.

== Season review ==
=== Pre-season ===
Liverpool began their pre-season schedule with a fixture against Guangdong Sunray Cave on 13 July as part of their tour of China, with Liverpool narrowly winning 4–3. Christian Poulsen scored his first Reds' goal, David Ngog and Andy Carroll grabbed one each and 18-year-old debutant Conor Coady also got a goal, with the new signing Charlie Adam featuring for 45 minutes. On 16 July 2011, they continued their tour of Asia when they played the Malaysia All-Stars XI team. They won the game 6–3 despite a number of defensive errors. Charlie Adam scored his first goal from the penalty spot, Maxi Rodríguez and David Ngog both got braces and Dirk Kuyt also scored to round off the victory. On 23 July, they travelled to the KC Stadium to play Hull City where they lost 3–0. The game saw other summer recruits Jordan Henderson, Stewart Downing and Doni make their debuts. They later played against Galatasaray in Istanbul on 28 July and lost 3–0 again. Next, they played Vålerenga away on 1 August and drew the game 3–3. Daniel Agger hit a brace and Andy Carroll scored the other. They played their final pre-season game on 6 August at Anfield against Valencia, winning 2–0. Andy Carroll and Dirk Kuyt were on the scoresheet, although the latter's shot appeared to take a deflection off Sotiris Kyrgiakos before rolling into the net.

=== August ===
Liverpool started their Premier League campaign on 13 August, at home to Sunderland. The match finished 1–1, the Liverpool goal coming in the 12th minute from Luis Suárez from a Charlie Adam free kick. Suárez had missed an early penalty which he had won after being brought down by Kieran Richardson, firing the ball over the bar from the spot. Andy Carroll had a goal ruled out before Sunderland equalised in the 57th minute with a volley from Sebastian Larsson. Jordan Henderson made his full Liverpool debut against his former club, with Charlie Adam, Stewart Downing and José Enrique also making their debuts, despite the latter signing just the day before.

Liverpool played their second league match against Arsenal on 20 August at the Emirates Stadium. Liverpool won the match 2–0, taking advantage of Arsenal's worries on and off the pitch. The first half saw Henderson and Carroll go close for Liverpool with headers, with Pepe Reina not even troubled by the hosts. In the second half, Arsenal midfielder Emmanuel Frimpong received a second yellow card after a dangerous tackle on Lucas. The visitors' first goal came in the 78th minute after Arsenal's young centre-back Ignasi Miquel's attempted to clear the ball, only for it to strike Aaron Ramsey in the chest and looped over Wojciech Szczęsny. Substitute Luis Suárez wrapped up the points in the 90th minute, when Raul Meireles squared the ball to him to tuck it under the oncoming Szczęsny. The 2–0 win was Liverpool's first victory at Arsenal since 2000, when a Titi Camara goal won the game for Liverpool.

Liverpool then faced a League Cup tie at Exeter City. Liverpool won 3–1, Suárez scoring in the 23rd minute and unselfishly setting up other two for Maxi Rodríguez in the 55th minute and substitute Andy Carroll in the 58th.

Liverpool faced Bolton Wanderers at Anfield. Liverpool won by the same margin of 3–1 with Henderson and Adam scoring their first goals for the club, Martin Škrtel also scoring with a header from a corner by Adam. This win saw Liverpool as overnight leaders of the Premier League for the first time since 2009.

=== September ===
Liverpool suffered their first defeat of the season on 10 September 2011, against Stoke City at the Britannia Stadium. Jonathan Walters scored the only goal of the game by converting a 21st-minute penalty.

Liverpool then traveled to White Hart Lane to play against Tottenham Hotspur. Spurs, by Luka Modrić, took an early lead, and Liverpool had trouble getting into the game. After 28 minutes, Charlie Adam received his second yellow card, and was sent off. After half time Liverpool got more into the game, but after 68 minutes, Martin Škrtel received his second yellow card, and reduced Liverpool to nine players. After two minutes, Spurs had scored two more goals, and in injury time, Emmanuel Adebayor sealed the game 4–0 to Tottenham, Liverpool's worst defeat to Tottenham since 1963.

Liverpool then traveled to Brighton to face Brighton and Hove Albion in the third round encounter of the League Cup. Craig Bellamy and Dirk Kuyt were on target for Liverpool. Ashley Barnes scored an injury time consolation for Brighton. The final score remained 2–1 in Liverpool's favor and they qualified for the fourth round.

Liverpool then hosted Wolverhampton Wanderers and returned to winning ways. They won by 2–1. Roger Johnson's own goal and Luis Suárez's goal gave them a 2–0 lead at halftime before Steven Fletcher scored in the second half to make the score 2–1.

=== October ===
Liverpool faced their local rivals Everton at Goodison Park and won 2–0. Jack Rodwell got sent off in the first half. Liverpool made benefit of the numerical advantage and scored twice in the second half through Luis Suárez and Andy Carroll, who scored his first league goal of the season.

Liverpool then hosted Manchester United. Steven Gerrard, who was making his first start after returning from injury, scored from a free kick to give Liverpool the lead before Javier Hernández scored to make the final score 1–1. The game was marred by Luis Suárez racially abusing United's Patrice Evra.

Liverpool then hosted the newcomers Norwich City and drew 1–1. Craig Bellamy scored in the stoppage time of first half. Substitute Grant Holt scored in the second half to make the score 1–1. Liverpool created a lot of opportunities throughout the game but were denied by the Norwich defense and goalkeeper and the match ended in a draw.

Liverpool then faced Stoke at Britannia Stadium in the fourth round of League Cup. Stoke took the lead in the first half thanks to a goal from Kenwyne Jones. Luis Suárez, however, scored two second half goals to give Liverpool the win and they made it to the quarter-final of the League Cup. This was Liverpool's first win after going a goal down since January.

Liverpool then faced West Bromwich Albion at The Hawthorns. Charlie Adam scored a ninth-minute penalty to give Liverpool the lead after Suárez was brought down. Andy Carroll scored at the end of first half to make the score 2–0 in Liverpool's favor.

=== November ===
After the 2–0 away win at West Brom, Liverpool then had a match at home to Swansea City, which finished a disappointing 0–0 draw. Liverpool once again had several chances but they still couldn't get the ball past Swansea keeper Michel Vorm, who made some world class saves.

After the international break, Liverpool had another league match away to Chelsea at Stamford Bridge the game finished 2–1 to Liverpool for their third consecutive win over the Londoners. Neat play from Craig Bellamy and Luis Suárez set up the first goal for Maxi Rodríguez to give the Reds a 1–0 lead before the interval. Ten minutes after half-time Daniel Sturridge leveled for Chelsea for 1–1 until late on in the 87th minute full-back Glen Johnson had a great run at goal and netted the winning goal.

Only two days after the Manchester City, Liverpool had a League Cup quarter-final tie against Chelsea. This time both, of the former Liverpool players, Raul Meireles and Fernando Torres, started whereas last time they both came off the bench. There were no goals in the first half but in the 58th minute, Maxi Rodríguez broke the deadlock from close range from Craig Bellamy's pass for 1–0. Five minutes later Martin Kelly headed in to make it 2–0 with his first goal for Liverpool. But this victory resulted in a serious injury by Lucas, who ruptured his anterior cruciate ligament (ACL) after colliding with Juan Mata, and he was ruled out for the rest of the season.

=== December ===
Liverpool's first game in December was an away match to Fulham at Craven Cottage which the Reds won 5–2 seven months ago. Liverpool pushed in the first half with Jordan Henderson hitting the post, but nothing came off and it was 0–0 at the interval. In the second half Liverpool went down to 10-men due to a controversial sending off for Jay Spearing for a challenge on Moussa Dembélé. Fulham made them pay as Clint Dempsey scored from close range off of a rebound in the 85th minute to win it for Fulham.

The Reds next had another league game against Queens Park Rangers at Anfield, which Liverpool won courtesy of a Luis Suárez header in the early stages of the second half. This win ended a run of four poor draws at home since they won 3–1 against Bolton.

Their next league game was against Aston Villa at Villa Park. The Reds won 2–0 with goals from Craig Bellamy and Martin Škrtel.

Liverpool's next fixture was an away tie against 18th-placed Wigan Athletic at the DW Stadium. The game ended as a goalless draw.

The next match was against Blackburn Rovers at home. Blackburn took an early courtesy of a Charlie Adam own goal during the end of the first half from a corner. Liverpool equalised with a Maxi Rodríguez header early in the second half. Liverpool put tremendous pressure on Blackburn's defence in the dying moments of the game, but were unlucky not to get three points thanks to some resolute defending by the away side. The game ended 1–1.

Just a few days later Liverpool played their last league game of 2011; a home tie against Newcastle United. Needing a win to keep up with their pursuit of a Champions League spot, Liverpool started the game off by going a goal down against the run of play; an unfortunate Daniel Agger deflection putting Newcastle in the lead in the 25th minute. The Reds responded almost instantly when Craig Bellamy pounced on a loose ball in the box three minutes later to equalise. In the second half, the Reds dominated play. Bellamy scored his second from a fantastic free kick, and returning captain Steven Gerrard completed the scoring with a fine finish in the 78th minute.

=== January ===
Liverpool's first game of 2012 involved a daunting trip to league leaders Manchester City FC. This was also the first of three games against the league leaders scheduled for January. The hosts had not lost a single game at their home ground in the Premier League all season. Liverpool started brightly but were unfortunate to go a goal down thanks to a Sergio Agüero strike early in the first half. The Reds eventually lost the game 3–0 after some fine Manchester City finishing. Their second game of the year was an FA Cup third Round tie against Oldham Athletic at Anfield. Liverpool eased past the opposition by winning 5–1. Stewart Downing and Jonjo Shelvey were amongst the goalscorers for the Reds, netting their first ever competitive goals for the club. On 11 January 2012 saw Liverpool face Manchester City for the second time in an away League Cup semi-final; the first of two legs to be played this month. After a convincing defeat the previous week at the same ground, Liverpool produced a fantastic defensive display after captain Gerrard had put them in front in the 13th minute from the penalty spot. They ran out 1–0 victors and condemning Manchester City to their second defeat in their last two games, as well as their first home game without scoring a goal.

On 14 January 2012, Liverpool drew 0–0 at home to Stoke City, followed one week later by a 3–1 away loss to Bolton, which manager Kenny Dalglish branded Liverpool's worst performance since his return. With this in mind, it created added pressure for the return leg of the League Cup semi-final against Manchester City. Liverpool had a number of chances to score, but excellent goalkeeping by Joe Hart kept them out and they fell behind twice. Their efforts eventually came to fruition, however, with the game ending as a 2–2 draw, with Liverpool winning 3–2 on aggregate and reaching Wembley for the first time since 1996 and the new Wembley for the first time. On 28 January 2012, Liverpool faced Manchester United in the FA Cup Fourth round at home. Liverpool started the scoring with Daniel Agger early on in the first half. Park Ji-sung netted one to create the equalizer. Substitute Dirk Kuyt netted a final one, defeating Manchester United. Next, the Reds faced Wolverhampton Wanderers away. Andy Carroll, Craig Bellamy and Dirk Kuyt were on target, ending the match 3–0.

=== February ===
The beginning of February saw the return to action of Luis Suárez following his eight-match ban. Due to their involvement in both domestic cups, Liverpool played only two league games in the month of February, a 0–0 draw against Tottenham, and a 2–1 loss away at Manchester United, where Suárez scored late on to provide a consolation goal. Liverpool went on to face Brighton & Hove Albion at Anfield in the fifth round of the FA Cup, a game they won 6–1 thanks to goals from Luis Suárez, Andy Carroll, Steven Gerrard, Martin Škrtel, and two Brighton own-goals. This saw them through to the sixth round, where they were drawn against Stoke City. Liverpool's last game of the month was the 2012 Football League Cup Final against Cardiff City at Wembley, held on 26 February 2012. The game finished 1–1 after 90 minutes, and 2–2 after extra time, with Liverpool prevailing 3–2 in the subsequent penalty shoot-out. This won Liverpool the Football League Cup for a record eighth time in their history, as well as ending a run of six years without a trophy.

=== March ===
Following victory in the League Cup, many predicted that Liverpool would be able to produce momentum that would take them towards Champions League qualification. Their league campaign began to falter however, with a first home defeat of the season to Arsenal after a last minute Robin van Persie goal gave them a 2–1 victory, followed by a scrappy 1–0 loss away at Sunderland. Three days later, Liverpool faced Everton in the second Merseyside derby of the season, this time at Anfield. The game also marked the 400th league appearance of Steven Gerrard for Liverpool, and he scored a hat-trick to give Liverpool a 3–0 victory. Liverpool would go on to secure a place in the FA Cup semi-final by defeating Stoke City 2–1 at Anfield, with strikes from Luis Suárez and Stewart Downing. Despite these successes, Liverpool were unable to revive their faltering league campaign, seeing a 2–0 lead turn into a 3–2 defeat at Loftus Road to QPR and losing 2–1 at Anfield to Wigan, both of whom were teams fighting relegation. This gave Liverpool a league record of five defeats in six games.

=== April ===
Liverpool began April with a 2–0 loss away at Newcastle, marked their sixth defeat in seven league games, officially their worst run of league results in 59 years. This saw pressure begin to mount on manager Kenny Dalglish, as Champions League qualification had become all but impossible for Liverpool for a third successive season. The defeat also saw Liverpool's first-choice keeper Pepe Reina – also the only player to start every game under Dalglish and played every minute of all competitive matches this season – receive a three-match ban after being sent off. This gave Doni his first competitive appearance for Liverpool, in a game the following week at Anfield against Aston Villa, which ended in a 1–1 draw. The following week Liverpool faced Blackburn away, in a remarkable game which saw Liverpool go 2–0 up through two goals from Maxi Rodríguez, only for Doni to be sent off for a foul in the penalty box, requiring Liverpool's third-choice keeper Brad Jones to replace him, and also become Liverpool's only goalkeeper for the FA Cup semi-final. Jones' first contribution for Liverpool was to save the penalty given by the foul. Blackburn then hit back twice through Yakubu, before Andy Carroll headed a winner in added time, securing Liverpool's first win in the league for almost a month.

Four days later, Liverpool faced Everton at Wembley in the FA Cup semi-final. Liverpool went into the semi-final trailing Everton in the league by one point, with many tipping Everton to beat Liverpool in a major semi-final for the first time in over a century. Nikica Jelavić gave Everton a 1–0 lead in the first half, with Luis Suárez equalising in the second half. The game looked to be heading towards extra time before Andy Carroll scored a second headed winner in as many games in the 87th minute, sending Liverpool through to their first FA Cup Final since 2006 – where they defeated West Ham United – and also their second cup final of the season. They will face Chelsea in the Final at Wembley on 5 May 2012. If they win this year's FA Cup Final, they will enter the group stage of 2012–13 UEFA Europa League directly without the need to enter the 2012–13 UEFA Europa League Qualifying Rounds. However, the last-gasp win over their local rivals was not enough to see renewed momentum in the league campaign however, as despite firing 30 shots on goal, Liverpool lost 1–0 at home to West Brom on 22 April. They ended the month with a win however, after Luis Suárez scored his first Liverpool hat-trick to seal a 3–0 win away at Norwich on 29 April.

=== May ===
Liverpool began May with a 1–0 defeat at home to Fulham, giving the Reds their fourth defeat in five games at Anfield. On 5 May 2012, they were defeated by Chelsea 2–1 in the 2012 FA Cup Final. Three days later the two teams faced each other for a Premier League meeting. Liverpool went out strong in the first half recording three goals in the first 30 minutes of the match. The first goal was a sensational run down the line from Luis Suárez and he crossed it in where then Michael Essien would score an own goal. Soon after, a ball played back from Ivanović to John Terry faulted as Terry fell and Jordan Henderson ran onto it and scored it with his dominate foot with a great finish. Four minutes later a far post corner from central midfielder Jonjo Shelvey was headed by Andy Carroll to Daniel Agger and resulted in a 3–0 lead over Chelsea after the first half. Within the second half Chelsea scored off of a Florent Malouda set piece outside the 18-yard box and chested in from Brazilian international Ramires. Later in the second half, Ross Turnbull kicked it to clear it and bluffed it and Jonjo Shelvey trapped it and made a sensational finish to secure a final 4–1 win for Liverpool. In the final game of the season, Liverpool faced an away trip to Swansea and suffered a 1–0 defeat. They concluded the Premier League season with 52 points, their worst tally over a 38-match Premier League season to this day.

== Transfers ==
=== Transfers in ===
First Team

No.	Pos.	Nat.	Name	Age	EU	Moving from	Type	Transfer window	Ends	Transfer fee	Source
14	CM	(England)	Jordan Henderson	20	EU	Sunderland	Transfer	Summer		£16,000,000	Liverpoolfc.tv
26	CM	(Scotland)	Charlie Adam	25	EU	Blackpool	Transfer	Summer		£6,700,000	Liverpoolfc.tv
32	GK	(Brazil)	Doni	31	EU	Roma (Italy)	Transfer	Summer		Free	Liverpoolfc.tv
19	LW	(England)	Stewart Downing	26	EU	Aston Villa	Transfer	Summer		£20,000,000	Liverpoolfc.tv
3	LB	(Spain)	José Enrique	25	EU	Newcastle United	Transfer	Summer		£5,000,000	Liverpoolfc.tv
16	CB	(Uruguay)	Sebastián Coates	20	Non-EU	Nacional (Uruguay)	Transfer	Summer		£7,000,000	Liverpoolfc.tv
39	FW	(Wales)	Craig Bellamy	32	EU	Manchester City	Transfer	Summer		Free	Liverpoolfc.tv

Last updated: 31 August 2011

Reserves and Academy

No.	Pos.	Nat.	Name	Age	EU	Moving from	Type	Transfer window	Ends	Transfer fee	Source
	RB	(Northern Ireland)	Ryan McLaughlin	16	EU		Transfer	Summer		Undisclosed	Liverpoolfc.tv
	LB	(Republic of Ireland)	Alex O'Hanlon	15	EU		Transfer	Summer		Compensation	Liverpool Echo
	CB	(Wales)	Lloyd Jones	15	EU	Plymouth Argyle	Transfer	Summer	2014	Undisclosed	Player's Twitter
	FW	(United States)	Villyan Bijev	18	EU	California Odyssey (United States)	Transfer	Summer		Undisclosed	Liverpoolfc.tv
	MF	(United States)	Marc Pelosi	32	EU		Transfer	n/a		Undisclosed	Liverpoolfc.tv
	MF	(England)	Sheyi Ojo	14	EU	Milton Keynes Dons	Transfer	n/a		Undisclosed	BBC
	FW	(England)	Jordon Ibe	16	EU	Wycombe Wanderers	Transfer	Winter		Undisclosed	Wycombewanderers.co.uk
	GK	(Wales)	Danny Ward	18	EU	Wrexham (Wales)	Transfer	Winter		Undisclosed	Liverpoolfc.tv
	AM	(Portugal)	João Carlos Teixeira	19	EU	Sporting CP (Portugal)	Transfer	Winter		Undisclosed	Liverpoolfc.tv

Last updated: 31 January 2012

=== Transfers out ===
First team

No.	Pos.	Nat.	Name	Age	EU	Moving to	Type	Transfer window	Transfer fee	Source
3	LB	(England)	Paul Konchesky	30	EU	Leicester City	Transfer	Summer	£1,500,000	
14	FW	(Serbia)	Milan Jovanović	30	EU	Anderlecht (Belgium)	Transfer	Summer	£700,000	
	MF	(Morocco)	Nabil El Zhar	23	EU	Levante (Spain)	Released	Summer		
16	CB	(Greece)	Sotirios Kyrgiakos	32	EU	VfL Wolfsburg (Germany)	Transfer	Summer	Free	
	LB	(Argentina)	Emiliano Insúa	22	EU	Sporting CP (Portugal)	Transfer	Summer	£3,000,000	
28	DM	(Denmark)	Christian Poulsen	31	EU	Evian (France)	Transfer	Summer	Free	
24	ST	(France)	David Ngog	22	EU	Bolton Wanderers	Transfer	Summer	£4,000,000	
	RB	(Switzerland)	Philipp Degen	28	EU	Basel (Switzerland)	Released	Summer		
4	CM	(Portugal)	Raul Meireles	28	EU	Chelsea	Transfer	Summer	£12,000,000	

Last updated: 31 August 2011

Reserves and Academy

No.	Pos.	Nat.	Name	Age	EU	Moving to	Type	Transfer window	Transfer fee	Source
	RB	(England)	Karl Clair	18	EU		Released	Summer		
43	GK	(Australia)	Dean Bouzanis	20	EU	Oldham Athletic	Released	Summer		
	GK	(England)	Deale Chamberlain	19	EU		Released	Summer		
36	CM	(England)	Steven Irwin	20	EU	Telstar (Netherlands)	Released	Summer		
	LB	(Scotland)	Alex Cooper	19	EU	Ross County (Scotland)	Released	Summer		
	FW	(Denmark)	Nikola Sarić	20	EU	Hajduk Split (Croatia)	Released	Summer		
48	LW	(Argentina)	Gerardo Bruna	20	EU	Blackpool	Transfer	Summer	Free	
	LB	(France)	Chris Mavinga	20	EU	Rennes (France)	Transfer	Summer	£880,000	
45	AM	(England)	Tom Ince	19	EU	Blackpool	Transfer	Summer	Undisclosed	
40	CB	(Spain)	Daniel Ayala	20	EU	Norwich City	Transfer	Summer	£800,000	
41	GK	(Denmark)	Martin Hansen	21	EU	Viborg FF (Denmark)	Transfer	Winter	Free	

Last updated: 31 January 2012

=== Loans out ===
#	Pos	Nat.	Player	To	Start	End	Source
32	RB	(England)	Stephen Darby	(England) Rochdale	7 July 2011	30 June 2012	
42	GK	(Hungary)	Péter Gulácsi	(England) Hull City	19 July 2011	13 April 2012†	
41	GK	(Denmark)	Martin Hansen	(England) Bradford City	28 July 2011	28 August 2011	
12	AM	(Spain)	Dani Pacheco	(Spain) Atlético Madrid	24 August 2011	30 June 2012	
15	CM	(Italy)	Alberto Aquilani	(Italy) Milan	25 August 2011	30 June 2012	
10	RW	(England)	Joe Cole	(France) Lille	31 August 2011	30 June 2012	
	FW	(United States)	Villyan Bijev	(Germany) Fortuna Düsseldorf	31 August 2011		
	RW	(England)	David Amoo	(England) Bury	23 September 2011	22 October 2011	
33	MF	(England)	Jonjo Shelvey	(England) Blackpool	30 September 2011	30 November 2011†	(Recall)
	FW	(England)	Nathan Eccleston	(England) Rochdale	20 October 2011	20 November 2011	
	MF	(Portugal)	Toni Silva	(England) Northampton Town	14 February 2011	30 June 2012	
	RW	(England)	David Amoo	(England) Bury	20 October 2011	2 January 2012	
22	CB	(Scotland)	Danny Wilson	(England) Blackpool	31 December 2011	30 June 2012	

Last updated: 31 December 2011

†Loan ended prematurely

== Players ==
=== First team ===
Players' age as of 31 May 2012 (end of the season)

No.	Name	Nationality	Position	Date of birth (age)	Signed from	Signed in	Contract ends
Goalkeepers
1	Brad Jones	(Australia)	GK	19 March 1982 (aged 30)	Middlesbrough	2010	2013
25	Pepe Reina	(Spain)	GK	31 August 1982 (aged 29)	Villarreal	2005	2016
32	Doni	(Brazil)	GK	22 October 1979 (aged 32)	Roma	2011	2013
Defenders
2	Glen Johnson	(England)	RB/LB	23 August 1984 (aged 27)	Portsmouth	2009	2015
3	José Enrique	(Spain)	LB	23 January 1986 (aged 26)	Newcastle United	2011	2015
5	Daniel Agger	(Denmark)	CB/LB	12 December 1984 (aged 27)	Brøndby	2006	2014
6	Fábio Aurélio	(Brazil)	LB	24 September 1979 (aged 32)	Valencia	2006	2012
16	Sebastián Coates	(Uruguay)	CB	7 October 1990 (aged 21)	Nacional	2011	2016
23	Jamie Carragher	(England)	CB/RB	28 January 1978 (aged 34)	The Academy	1996	2013
34	Martin Kelly	(England)	RB/CB	27 April 1990 (aged 22)	The Academy	2008	2014
37	Martin Škrtel	(Slovakia)	CB	15 December 1984 (aged 27)	Zenit Saint Petersburg	2008	2014
38	Jon Flanagan	(England)	RB	1 January 1993 (aged 19)	The Academy	2011	2015
49	Jack Robinson	(England)	LB	1 September 1993 (aged 18)	The Academy	2010	2013
Midfielders
8	Steven Gerrard (C)	(England)	CM/AM	30 May 1980 (aged 32)	The Academy	1998	2015
11	Maxi Rodríguez	(Argentina)	LW/RW	2 January 1981 (aged 31)	Atlético Madrid	2010	2013
14	Jordan Henderson	(England)	CM/RW	17 June 1990 (aged 21)	Sunderland	2011	2016
19	Stewart Downing	(England)	LW/RW	22 July 1984 (aged 27)	Aston Villa	2011	2015
20	Jay Spearing	(England)	DM/CM	25 November 1988 (aged 23)	The Academy	2008	2015
21	Lucas	(Brazil)	DM/CM	9 January 1987 (aged 25)	Grêmio	2007	2015
26	Charlie Adam	(Scotland)	CM	10 December 1985 (aged 26)	Blackpool	2011	2016
31	Raheem Sterling	(England)	LW/RW	8 December 1994 (aged 17)	The Academy	2012	2016
33	Jonjo Shelvey	(England)	CM/AM	27 February 1992 (aged 20)	Charlton Athletic	2010	2014
Forwards
7	Luis Suárez	(Uruguay)	FW	24 January 1987 (aged 25)	Ajax	2011	2016
9	Andy Carroll	(England)	ST	6 January 1989 (aged 23)	Newcastle United	2011	2016
18	Dirk Kuyt	(Netherlands)	FW/RW	22 July 1980 (aged 31)	Feyenoord	2006	2013
39	Craig Bellamy	(Wales)	FW/LW	13 July 1979 (aged 32)	Manchester City	2011	2013

==== Notes ====
- Fábio Aurélio, Lucas, and Maxi Rodríguez also hold Italian citizenship.

== Competitions ==
=== Overall ===
Competition	Started round	Current position / round	Final position / round	First match	Last match
Premier League	—	—	8th	13 August 2011	13 May 2012
Football League Cup	2nd round	—	Winner	24 August 2011	26 February 2012
FA Cup	3rd round	—	Runner-up	6 January 2012	5 May 2012

Updated to match played 13 May 2012
Source: Competitions

=== Pre-season matches ===
13 July 2011 Friendly	Guangdong Sunray Cave (China)	3–4	(England) Liverpool	Guangzhou, China
13:00 BST	Steer 45'; Lu Lin 89'; Yin Hongbo 90'	Report	Poulsen 20'; Ngog 22'; Coady 72'; Carroll 85'	Stadium: Tianhe Stadium

16 July 2011 Friendly	Malaysia XI	3–6	(England) Liverpool	Kuala Lumpur, Malaysia
10:45 BST	Safiq 40'; Safee 79', 80'	Report	Adam 27' (pen.); Ngog 68', 69'; Rodríguez 76', 90'; Kuyt 90+4'	Stadium: Bukit Jalil Stadium

23 July 2011 Friendly	Hull City (England)	3–0	(England) Liverpool	Kingston upon Hull, England
15:00 BST	Brady 21'; Koren 34'; Simpson 58'	Report		Stadium: KC Stadium

28 July 2011 Friendly	Galatasaray (Turkey)	3–0	(England) Liverpool	Istanbul, Turkey
19:00 BST	Baroš 8', 40'; Elmander 83'	Report		Stadium: Türk Telekom Arena

1 August 2011 Friendly	Vålerenga (Norway)	3–3	(England) Liverpool	Oslo, Norway
18:00 BST	Koné 13'; Ogude 19' (pen.); Fellah 90+4'	Report	Carroll 43'; Agger 83', 88'	Stadium: Ullevaal Stadion

6 August 2011 Friendly	Liverpool (England)	2–0	(Spain) Valencia	Liverpool, England
17:30 BST	Carroll 6'; Kuyt 90'	Report		Stadium: Anfield; Referee: Martin Atkinson

=== Premier League ===
==== League table ====
Pos	Team	Pld	W	D	L	GF	GA	GD	Pts	Qualification or relegation
6	Chelsea	38	18	10	10	65	46	+19	64	Qualification for the Champions League group stage (Note: Chelsea won the Champions League and thus qualified for the group stage as defending champions, forfeiting their spot in the Europa League as the FA Cup winners. This meant that Tottenham were to compete in the Europa League group stage, since, pursuant to the rules, only four clubs from the Premier League could play in the Champions League.)
7	Everton	38	15	11	12	50	40	+10	56	
8	Liverpool	38	14	10	14	47	40	+7	52	Qualification for the Europa League third qualifying round (Note: Liverpool won the League Cup and thus qualified for the Europa League third qualifying round.)
9	Fulham	38	14	10	14	48	51	−3	52	
10	West Bromwich Albion	38	13	8	17	45	52	−7	47	

Source: Barclays Premier League
Rules for classification: 1) points; 2) goal difference; 3) number of goals scored.

==== Results summary ====
Overall								Home						Away					
Pld	W	D	L	GF	GA	GD	Pts	W	D	L	GF	GA	GD	W	D	L	GF	GA	GD
38	14	10	14	47	40	+7	52	6	9	4	24	16	+8	8	1	10	23	24	−1

==== Results by round ====
Round	1	2	3	4	5	6	7	8	9	10	11	12	13	14	15	16	17	18	19	20	21	22	23	24	25	26	27	28	29	30	31	32	33	34	35	36	37	38
Ground	H	A	H	A	A	H	A	H	H	A	H	A	H	A	H	A	A	H	H	A	H	A	A	H	A	H	A	H	A	H	A	H	A	H	A	H	H	A
Result	D	W	W	L	L	W	W	D	D	W	D	W	D	L	W	W	D	D	W	L	D	L	W	D	L	L	L	W	L	L	L	D	W	L	W	L	W	L
Position	5	5	3	6	8	5	5	5	6	6	6	6	6	7	6	6	6	6	6	6	7	7	6	7	7	7	7	7	7	7	8	8	8	8	8	8	8	8

Updated to match(es) played on 13 May 2012. Source: matches
A = Away; H = Home; W = Win; D = Draw; L = Loss

==== Matches ====
13 August 2011 1	Liverpool	1–1	Sunderland	Liverpool
15:00 BST	Suárez 12'; Carragher (yellow card) 45'; Henderson (yellow card) 60'; Adam (yellow card) 66'; Kuyt (yellow card) 72'	Report	Richardson (yellow card) 6'; Cattermole (yellow card) 27'; Bardsley (yellow card) 45'; Larsson 57'; Larsson (yellow card) 78'	Stadium: Anfield; Attendance: 45,018; Referee: Phil Dowd

20 August 2011 2	Arsenal	0–2	Liverpool	London
12:45 BST	Frimpong (yellow card) 8' (yellow-red card) 70'; Lansbury (yellow card) 88'	Report	Carroll (yellow card) 28'; Lucas (yellow card) 44'; Ramsey 78' (o.g.); Suárez 90'	Stadium: Emirates Stadium; Attendance: 60,090; Referee: Martin Atkinson

27 August 2011 3	Liverpool	3–1	Bolton Wanderers	Liverpool
17:30 BST	Henderson 15'; Škrtel 52'; Adam 53'	Report	Klasnić 90+2'	Stadium: Anfield; Attendance: 44,725; Referee: Lee Probert

10 September 2011 4	Stoke City	1–0	Liverpool	Stoke-on-Trent
15:00 BST	Walters 21' (pen.)	Report		Stadium: Britannia Stadium; Attendance: 27,592; Referee: Mark Clattenburg

18 September 2011 5	Tottenham Hotspur	4–0	Liverpool	London
13:30 BST	Modrić 7'; Defoe 66'; Adebayor 68', 90+3'	Report		Stadium: White Hart Lane; Attendance: 36,230; Referee: Mike Jones

24 September 2011 6	Liverpool	2–1	Wolverhampton Wanderers	Liverpool
15:00 BST	Johnson 11' (o.g.); Suárez 38'	Report	Fletcher 49'	Stadium: Anfield; Attendance: 44,922; Referee: Kevin Friend

1 October 2011 7	Everton	0–2	Liverpool	Liverpool
12:45 BST		Report	Carroll 71'; Suárez 82'	Stadium: Goodison Park; Attendance: 39,510; Referee: Martin Atkinson

15 October 2011 8	Liverpool	1–1	Manchester United	Liverpool
12:45 BST	Gerrard 68'	Report	Hernández 81'	Stadium: Anfield; Attendance: 45,065; Referee: Andre Marriner

22 October 2011 9	Liverpool	1–1	Norwich City	Liverpool
17:30 BST	Bellamy 45+1'	Report	Holt 60'	Stadium: Anfield; Attendance: 44,931; Referee: Peter Walton

29 October 2011 10	West Bromwich Albion	0–2	Liverpool	West Bromwich
17:30 BST		Report	Adam 9' (pen.); Carroll 45+1'	Stadium: The Hawthorns; Attendance: 25,522; Referee: Lee Mason

5 November 2011 11	Liverpool	0–0	Swansea City	Liverpool
15:00 GMT		Report		Stadium: Anfield; Attendance: 45,013; Referee: Phil Dowd

20 November 2011 12	Chelsea	1–2	Liverpool	London
16:00 GMT	Sturridge 54'	Report	Rodríguez 33'; Johnson 87'	Stadium: Stamford Bridge; Attendance: 41,820; Referee: Lee Probert

27 November 2011 13	Liverpool	1–1	Manchester City	Liverpool
16:00 GMT	Lescott 33' (o.g.); Carroll (yellow card) 90'	Report	Kompany (yellow card) 13' (goal) 31'; Barry (yellow card) 32'; Balotelli (yellow card) 77' (yellow-red card) 83'; Milner (yellow card) 86'	Stadium: Anfield; Attendance: 45,071; Referee: Martin Atkinson

5 December 2011 14	Fulham	1–0	Liverpool	London
20:00 GMT	Dembélé (yellow card) 45'; Dempsey (yellow card) 48', (goal) 85'; Senderos (yellow card) 59'	Report	Bellamy (yellow card) 48'; Spearing (red card) 72'	Stadium: Craven Cottage; Attendance: 25,688; Referee: Kevin Friend

10 December 2011 15	Liverpool	1–0	Queens Park Rangers	Liverpool
15:00 GMT	Suárez 47'	Report		Stadium: Anfield; Attendance: 45,016; Referee: Lee Mason

18 December 2011 16	Aston Villa	0–2	Liverpool	Birmingham
14:05 GMT	N'Zogbia (yellow card) 13'	Report	Bellamy 11', (yellow card) 30'; Škrtel 15'; Adam (yellow card) 28'	Stadium: Villa Park; Attendance: 37,460; Referee: Peter Walton

21 December 2011 17	Wigan Athletic	0–0	Liverpool	Wigan
20:00 GMT		Report		Stadium: DW Stadium; Attendance: 19,230; Referee: Michael Oliver

26 December 2011 18	Liverpool	1–1	Blackburn Rovers	Liverpool
15:00 GMT	Rodríguez 53'	Report	Adam 45' (o.g.)	Stadium: Anfield; Attendance: 44,441; Referee: Mike Jones

30 December 2011 19	Liverpool	3–1	Newcastle United	Liverpool
19:45 GMT	Bellamy 29', 67'; Gerrard 78'	Report	Agger 25' (o.g.)	Stadium: Anfield; Attendance: 44,372; Referee: Lee Probert

3 January 2012 20	Manchester City	3–0	Liverpool	Manchester
20:00 GMT	Agüero 10'; Y. Touré 33'; Milner 75' (pen.)	Report		Stadium: Etihad Stadium; Attendance: 47,131; Referee: Mike Jones

14 January 2012 21	Liverpool	0–0	Stoke City	Liverpool
15:00 GMT		Report		Stadium: Anfield; Attendance: 44,691; Referee: Howard Webb

21 January 2012 22	Bolton Wanderers	3–1	Liverpool	Bolton
17:30 GMT	Davies 4'; Reo-Coker 29'; Steinsson 50'	Report	Bellamy 37'; José Enrique (yellow card) 63'; Kuyt (yellow card) 90+2'	Stadium: Reebok Stadium; Attendance: 26,854; Referee: Kevin Friend

31 January 2012 23	Wolverhampton Wanderers	0–3	Liverpool	Wolverhampton
19:45 GMT		Report	Carroll 52'; Bellamy 61'; Kuyt 78'	Stadium: Molineux Stadium; Attendance: 27,447; Referee: Anthony Taylor

6 February 2012 24	Liverpool	0–0	Tottenham Hotspur	Liverpool
20:00 GMT		Report		Stadium: Anfield; Attendance: 44,461; Referee: Mike Oliver

11 February 2012 25	Manchester United	2–1	Liverpool	Manchester
12:45 GMT	Rooney 47', 50'	Report	Suárez 80'	Stadium: Old Trafford; Attendance: 74,844; Referee: Phil Dowd

3 March 2012 26	Liverpool	1–2	Arsenal	Liverpool
12:45 GMT	Koscielny 23' (o.g.)	Report	Van Persie 31', 90+2'	Stadium: Anfield; Attendance: 44,922; Referee: Mark Halsey

10 March 2012 27	Sunderland	1–0	Liverpool	Sunderland
15:00 GMT	Bendtner 56'	report		Stadium: Stadium of Light; Attendance: 41,661; Referee: Antony Taylor

13 March 2012 28	Liverpool	3–0	Everton	Liverpool
20:00 GMT	Gerrard 34', 50', 90+3'	Report		Stadium: Anfield; Attendance: 44,921; Referee: Phil Dowd

21 March 2012 29	Queens Park Rangers	3–2	Liverpool	London
20:00 GMT	Derry 77'; Cissé 86'; Mackie 90+1'	Report	Coates 54'; Kuyt 72'	Stadium: Loftus Road; Attendance: 18,033; Referee: Howard Webb

24 March 2012 30	Liverpool	1–2	Wigan Athletic	Liverpool
15:00 GMT	Suárez 47' (yellow card) 54'	Report	Maloney 30' (pen.); Di Santo (yellow card) 43'; Figueroa (yellow card) 53'; Caldwell 63'	Stadium: Anfield; Attendance: 44,431; Referee: Lee Mason

1 April 2012 31	Newcastle United	2–0	Liverpool	Newcastle
13:30 BST	Cissé 19', 59', (yellow card) 30'; Tioté (yellow card) 48'; Perch (yellow card) 82'	Report	Carroll (yellow card) 10'; Shelvey (yellow card) 17'; Flanagan (yellow card) 45'; Reina (red card) 81'	Stadium: St James' Park; Attendance: 52,363; Referee: Martin Atkinson

7 April 2012 32	Liverpool	1–1	Aston Villa	Liverpool
15:00 BST	Suárez 82'	Report	Herd 10'	Stadium: Anfield; Attendance: 44,321; Referee: Michael Oliver

10 April 2012 33	Blackburn Rovers	2–3	Liverpool	Blackburn
20:00 BST	Orr (yellow card) 28'; Yakubu 36', 61' (pen.); Hoilett (yellow card) 62'; Formica (yellow card) 64'; Hanley (yellow card) 90'	Report	Flanagan (yellow card) 12'; Rodríguez 13', 16', (yellow card) 45+1'; Doni (red card) 25'; Jones (yellow card) 61'; Bellamy (yellow card) 72'; Henderson (yellow card) 86'; Carroll 90'	Stadium: Ewood Park; Attendance: 23,571; Referee: Anthony Taylor

22 April 2012 34	Liverpool	0–1	West Bromwich Albion	Liverpool
16:00 BST	Shelvey (yellow card) 90+4'	Report	Odemwingie 75'	Stadium: Anfield; Attendance: 43,660; Referee: Neil Swarbrick

28 April 2012 35	Norwich City	0–3	Liverpool	Norwich
17:30 BST		Report	Suárez 24', 28', 82'	Stadium: Carrow Road; Attendance: 26,819; Referee: Mark Halsey

1 May 2012 36	Liverpool	0–1	Fulham	Liverpool
19:45 BST		Report	Škrtel 5' (o.g.)	Stadium: Anfield; Attendance: 40,106; Referee: Lee Probert

8 May 2012 37	Liverpool	4–1	Chelsea	Liverpool
20:00 BST	Essien 19' (o.g.); Henderson 25'; Agger 28'; Shelvey 61'	Report	Ramires 50'	Stadium: Anfield; Attendance: 40,721; Referee: Kevin Friend

13 May 2012 38	Swansea City	1–0	Liverpool	Swansea
15:00 BST	Graham 86'	Report		Stadium: Liberty Stadium; Attendance: 20,605; Referee: Mark Halsey

=== Football League Cup ===
24 August 2011 Second round	Exeter City	1–3	Liverpool	Exeter
19:45 BST	Nardiello 80' (pen.)	Report	Suárez 23'; Rodríguez 55'; Carroll 58'	Stadium: St James Park; Attendance: 8,290; Referee: Tony Bates

21 September 2011 Third round	Brighton & Hove Albion	1–2	Liverpool	Brighton
19:45 BST	Barnes 90' (pen.)	Report	Bellamy 7'; Kuyt 81'	Stadium: Falmer Stadium; Attendance: 21,897; Referee: Michael Oliver

26 October 2011 Fourth round	Stoke City	1–2	Liverpool	Stoke-on-Trent
19:45 BST	Jones 44'	Report	Suárez 54', 85'	Stadium: Britannia Stadium; Attendance: 24,934; Referee: Lee Probert

29 November 2011 Fifth round	Chelsea	0–2	Liverpool	London
19:45 GMT		Report	Rodríguez 58'; Kelly 63'	Stadium: Stamford Bridge; Attendance: 40,511; Referee: Phil Dowd

11 January 2012 Semi-finals; First leg	Manchester City	0–1	Liverpool	Manchester
19:45 GMT		Report	Gerrard 13' (pen.)	Stadium: Etihad Stadium; Attendance: 36,017; Referee: Lee Mason

25 January 2012 Semi-finals; Second leg	Liverpool	2–2 (3–2 agg.)	Manchester City	Liverpool
19:45 GMT	Gerrard 41' (pen.); Bellamy 74'	Report	De Jong 31'; Džeko 67'	Stadium: Anfield; Attendance: 44,590; Referee: Phil Dowd

26 February 2012 Final	Cardiff City	2–2 (a.e.t.) (2–3 p)	Liverpool	London
16:00 GMT	Mason 19'; Kiss (yellow card) 98'; Turner 118' (yellow card) 119'	Report	Henderson (yellow card) 52'; Škrtel 60'; Kuyt 108'	Stadium: Wembley Stadium; Attendance: 89,044; Referee: Mark Clattenburg
	Penalties
	Miller (penalty missed); Cowie (penalty scored); Gestede (penalty missed); Whittingham (penalty scored); Gerrard (penalty missed)		(penalty missed) Gerrard; (penalty missed) Adam; (penalty scored) Kuyt; (penalty scored) Downing; (penalty scored) Johnson

=== FA Cup ===
6 January 2012 Third round	Liverpool	5–1	Oldham Athletic	Liverpool
20:00 GMT	Bellamy 30'; Gerrard 45+1' (pen.); Shelvey 68'; Carroll 89'; Downing 90+5'	Report	Simpson 28'	Stadium: Anfield; Attendance: 44,556; Referee: Neil Swarbrick

28 January 2012 Fourth round	Liverpool	2–1	Manchester United	Liverpool
12:45 GMT	Agger 21'; Kuyt 88'	Report	Park 39'	Stadium: Anfield; Attendance: 43,952; Referee: Mark Halsey

19 February 2012 Fifth round	Liverpool	6–1	Brighton & Hove Albion	Liverpool
16:30 GMT	Škrtel 5'; Bridcutt 44' (o.g.); Carroll 57'; Gerrard 71'; Dunk 75' (o.g.); Suárez 84'	Report	LuaLua 17'	Stadium: Anfield; Attendance: 43,940; Referee: Andre Marriner

18 March 2012 Quarter-finals	Liverpool	2–1	Stoke City	Liverpool
16:00 GMT	Suárez 23'; Downing 57'	Report	Crouch 26'	Stadium: Anfield; Attendance: 43,962; Referee: Kevin Friend

14 April 2012 Semi-finals	Liverpool	2–1	Everton	London
12:30 BST	Suárez 62'; Carroll 87'	Report	Jelavić 24'	Stadium: Wembley Stadium; Attendance: 87,231; Referee: Howard Webb

5 May 2012 Final	Chelsea	2–1	Liverpool	London
17:15 BST	Ramires 11'; Drogba 52'	Report	Carroll 64'	Stadium: Wembley Stadium; Attendance: 89,102; Referee: Phil Dowd

=== Other ===
==== Friendly ====
18 October 2011	Rangers	1–0	Liverpool	Glasgow
19:30 BST	McCulloch 20'	Report		Stadium: Ibrox Stadium; Attendance: 27,453; Referee: William Collum

Source: Liverpoolfc.tv

== Squad statistics ==
=== Appearances and goals ===
As of 20 March 2012.

No.	Pos.	Name	Premier League				FA Cup				League Cup				Total			
No.	Pos.	Name	Apps	Starts	Goals	Assists	Apps	Starts	Goals	Assists	Apps	Starts	Goals	Assists	Apps	Starts	Goals	Assists
1	GK	(Australia) Brad Jones	1	0	0	0	1	1	0	0	0	0	0	0	2	1	0	0
2	DF	(England) Glen Johnson	23	22	1	1	3	3	0	1	3	3	0	1	29	28	1	3
3	DF	(Spain) José Enrique	35	33	0	2	4	4	0	0	4	3	0	0	43	40	0	2
5	DF	(Denmark) Daniel Agger	27	24	1	3	3	3	1	0	4	4	0	2	34	31	1	5
6	DF	(Brazil) Fábio Aurélio	2	1	0	0	1	1	0	0	0	0	0	0	3	2	0	0
7	FW	(Uruguay) Luis Suárez	31	29	11	6	4	4	3	1	4	4	3	4	39	37	17	11
8	MF	(England) Steven Gerrard	18	12	5	2	6	6	2	4	4	3	2	0	28	21	9	6
9	FW	(England) Andy Carroll	35	21	4	3	6	4	4	2	6	4	1	0	47	29	9	5
11	MF	(Argentina) Maxi Rodríguez	12	10	4	1	5	3	0	2	4	4	2	1	21	17	6	4
14	MF	(England) Jordan Henderson	37	31	2	2	5	4	0	0	6	6	0	2	48	41	2	4
16	DF	(Uruguay) Sebastián Coates	7	4	1	0	2	1	0	0	3	3	0	0	12	8	1	0
18	FW	(Netherlands) Dirk Kuyt	34	22	2	3	5	1	1	0	5	2	2	0	44	25	5	3
19	MF	(England) Stewart Downing	36	28	0	2	6	5	2	2	4	3	0	0	46	36	2	4
20	MF	(England) Jay Spearing	16	15	0	1	4	4	0	0	5	5	0	0	25	24	0	1
21	MF	(Brazil) Lucas	12	12	0	0	0	0	0	0	3	3	0	1	15	15	0	1
23	DF	(England) Jamie Carragher	21	19	0	0	5	5	0	0	5	3	0	0	31	27	0	0
25	GK	(Spain) Pepe Reina	34	34	0	0	5	5	0	0	7	7	0	0	46	46	0	0
26	MF	(Scotland) Charlie Adam	28	27	2	11	2	1	0	0	5	3	0	0	35	31	2	11
31	MF	(England) Raheem Sterling	3	0	0	0	0	0	0	0	0	0	0	0	3	0	0	0
32	GK	(Brazil) Doni	4	4	0	0	0	0	0	0	0	0	0	0	4	4	0	0
33	MF	(England) Jonjo Shelvey	13	8	1	0	2	1	1	1	1	0	0	0	16	9	2	1
34	DF	(England) Martin Kelly	12	12	0	1	3	3	0	0	5	4	1	0	20	19	1	1
37	DF	(Slovakia) Martin Škrtel	34	33	2	1	5	5	1	0	6	4	1	0	45	42	4	1
38	DF	(England) Jon Flanagan	5	5	0	0	1	0	0	2	2	1	0	0	8	6	0	2
39	FW	(Wales) Craig Bellamy	27	12	6	3	4	2	1	2	6	4	2	2	37	18	9	7
49	DF	(England) Jack Robinson	0	0	0	0	0	0	0	0	2	2	0	0	2	2	0	0
–	–	Own goals	–	–	5	–	–	–	2	–	–	–	0	–	–	–	7	–
–	–	Totals	-	–	47	42	–	–	18	17	–	–	14	13	–	–	79	72
Players who are on loan/left Liverpool that have appeared this season:
4	MF	(Portugal) Raul Meireles	2	0	0	1	0	0	0	0	1	1	0	0	3	1	0	1
22	DF	(Scotland) Danny Wilson	0	0	0	0	0	0	0	0	1	1	0	0	1	1	0	0

=== Top scorers ===
Includes all competitive matches. The list is sorted by shirt number when total goals are equal.

Last updated on 8 May 2012.

Position	Nation	Number	Name.	Premier League	League Cup	FA Cup	Total
1	(Uruguay)	7	Luis Suárez	11	3	3	17
2	(England)	8	Steven Gerrard	5	2	2	9
2	(England)	9	Andy Carroll	4	1	4	9
2	(Wales)	39	Craig Bellamy	6	2	1	9
5	(Argentina)	11	Maxi Rodríguez	4	2	0	6
6	(Netherlands)	18	Dirk Kuyt	2	2	1	5
7	(Slovakia)	37	Martin Škrtel	2	1	1	4
8	(Denmark)	5	Daniel Agger	1	0	1	2
8	(England)	14	Jordan Henderson	2	0	0	2
8	(England)	19	Stewart Downing	0	0	2	2
8	(Scotland)	26	Charlie Adam	2	0	0	2
8	(England)	33	Jonjo Shelvey	1	0	1	2
13	(England)	2	Glen Johnson	1	0	0	1
13	(Uruguay)	16	Sebastián Coates	1	0	0	1
13	(England)	34	Martin Kelly	0	1	0	1
#	Own Goals			5	0	2	7
TOTALS				47	14	18	79

=== Assists ===
Includes all competitive matches. The list is sorted by shirt number when total assists are equal.

Last updated on 8 May 2012.

Position	Nationality	Number	Name	Premier League	League Cup	FA Cup	Total
1	(Uruguay)	7	Luis Suárez	4	4	0	8
2	(Scotland)	26	Charlie Adam	7	0	0	7
2	(Wales)	39	Craig Bellamy	3	2	2	7
4	(England)	9	Andy Carroll	3	0	3	6
5	(England)	8	Steven Gerrard	3	0	2	5
6	(Argentina)	11	Maxi Rodríguez	1	1	2	4
7	(Denmark)	5	Daniel Agger	1	2	0	3
7	(Netherlands)	18	Dirk Kuyt	3	0	0	3
7	(England)	19	Stewart Downing	2	0	1	3
10	(Spain)	3	José Enrique	2	0	0	2
10	(England)	14	Jordan Henderson	0	2	0	2
10	(England)	20	Jay Spearing	2	0	0	2
10	(England)	38	Jon Flanagan	0	0	2	2
14	(England)	2	Glen Johnson	0	1	0	1
14	(Brazil)	21	Lucas	0	1	0	1
14	(England)	33	Jonjo Shelvey	0	0	1	1
14	(England)	34	Martin Kelly	1	0	0	1
14	(Slovakia)	37	Martin Škrtel	1	0	0	1
14	(Portugal)	4	**Raul Meireles	1	0	0	1
TOTALS				34	13	13	60

** Players who no longer play for Liverpool's current season

=== Disciplinary record ===
Includes all competitive matches. The list is sorted by shirt number when total bookings are equal.

Last updated on 8 May 2012.

R	No.	Pos	Nat	Name	Premier League			League Cup			FA Cup			Total		
R	No.	Pos	Nat	Name	Yellow card	(yellow card) (yellow-red card)	Red card	Yellow card	(yellow card) (yellow-red card)	Red card	Yellow card	(yellow card) (yellow-red card)	Red card	Yellow card	(yellow card) (yellow-red card)	Red card
1	5	DF	(Denmark)	Daniel Agger	5	0	0	0	0	0	1	0	0	6	0	0
1	14	MF	(England)	Jordan Henderson	3	0	0	2	0	0	1	0	0	6	0	0
1	21	MF	(Brazil)	Lucas	5	0	0	1	0	0	0	0	0	6	0	0
1	26	MF	(Scotland)	Charlie Adam	5	1	0	0	0	0	0	0	0	5	1	0
1	39	FW	(Wales)	Craig Bellamy	6	0	0	0	0	0	0	0	0	6	0	0
6	7	FW	(Uruguay)	Luis Suárez	4	0	0	0	0	0	1	0	0	5	0	0
7	9	FW	(England)	Andy Carroll	3	0	0	1	0	0	0	0	0	4	0	0
7	37	DF	(Slovakia)	Martin Škrtel	2	1	0	0	0	0	1	0	0	3	1	0
9	3	DF	(Spain)	José Enrique	2	0	0	1	0	0	0	0	0	3	0	0
9	18	FW	(Netherlands)	Dirk Kuyt	3	0	0	0	0	0	0	0	0	3	0	0
9	23	DF	(England)	Jamie Carragher	1	0	0	2	0	0	0	0	0	3	0	0
12	2	DF	(England)	Glen Johnson	2	0	0	0	0	0	0	0	0	2	0	0
12	16	DF	(Uruguay)	Sebastián Coates	1	0	0	1	0	0	0	0	0	2	0	0
12	20	MF	(England)	Jay Spearing	0	0	1	1	0	0	0	0	0	1	0	1
12	25	GK	(Spain)	Pepe Reina	0	0	1	0	0	0	1	0	0	1	0	1
12	34	DF	(England)	Martin Kelly	1	0	0	0	0	0	1	0	0	2	0	0
12	38	DF	(England)	Jon Flanagan	2	0	0	0	0	0	0	0	0	2	0	0
18	1	GK	(Australia)	Brad Jones	1	0	0	0	0	0	0	0	0	1	0	0
18	8	MF	(England)	Steven Gerrard	0	0	0	1	0	0	0	0	0	1	0	0
18	11	MF	(Argentina)	Maxi Rodríguez	1	0	0	0	0	0	0	0	0	1	0	0
18	32	GK	(Brazil)	Doni	0	0	1	0	0	0	0	0	0	0	0	1
18	33	MF	(England)	Jonjo Shelvey	1	0	0	0	0	0	0	0	0	1	0	0
TOTALS					48	2	3	10	0	0	6	0	0	64	2	3
