= The FA England Awards =

Former award ceremony and annual vote

- First award: 2003
- Website: http://www.thefa.com

The FA England Awards is an annual online vote for England supporters. It used to be an award ceremony hosted by The Football Association. The inaugural edition took place on 3 February 2003, although The FA Women's Football Awards started in 1999.

== Senior Men's Player of the Year ==
The Senior Men's Player of the Year is a football award presented by The Football Association to the most outstanding performers of the England national team. The award was originally given out at the end of the calendar year but from 2020–21, it moved to a seasonal honour and is decided by an online poll by England fans on EnglandFootball.com (formerly TheFA.com).

Below is a list of all the recipients of this award:

Year	Place	Player	Playing position	Club	Source
2003	1	David Beckham	Midfielder	(England) Manchester United	
2003	2	Wayne Rooney	Forward	(England) Everton	
2003	3	Frank Lampard	Midfielder	(England) Chelsea	
2004	1	Frank Lampard	Midfielder	(England) Chelsea	
2004	2	Wayne Rooney	Forward	(England) Manchester United	
2004	3	Steven Gerrard	Midfielder	(England) Liverpool	
2005	1	Frank Lampard	Midfielder	(England) Chelsea	
2006	1	Owen Hargreaves	Midfielder	(Germany) Bayern Munich	
2006	2	Steven Gerrard	Midfielder	(England) Liverpool	
2007	1	Steven Gerrard	Midfielder	(England) Liverpool	
2007	2	Micah Richards	Defender	(England) Manchester City	
2008	1	Wayne Rooney	Forward	(England) Manchester United	
2008	2	Gareth Barry	Midfielder	(England) Aston Villa	
2008	3	Theo Walcott	Midfielder	(England) Arsenal	
2009	1	Wayne Rooney	Forward	(England) Manchester United	
2010	1	Ashley Cole	Defender	(England) Chelsea	
2010	2	Steven Gerrard	Midfielder	(England) Liverpool	
2010	3	Adam Johnson	Midfielder	(England) Manchester City	
2011	1	Scott Parker	Midfielder	(England) Tottenham Hotspur	
2011	2	Joe Hart	Goalkeeper	(England) Manchester City	
2011	3	Ashley Young	Midfielder	(England) Manchester United	
2012	1	Steven Gerrard	Midfielder	(England) Liverpool	
2012	2	Danny Welbeck	Forward	(England) Manchester United	
2012	3	Ashley Cole	Defender	(England) Chelsea	
2014	1	Wayne Rooney	Forward	(England) Manchester United	
2014	2	Danny Welbeck	Forward	(England) Arsenal	
2014	3	Raheem Sterling	Midfielder	(England) Liverpool	
2015	1	Wayne Rooney	Forward	(England) Manchester United	
2015	2	Harry Kane	Forward	(England) Tottenham Hotspur	
2015	3	Joe Hart	Goalkeeper	(England) Manchester City	
2016	1	Adam Lallana	Midfielder	(England) Liverpool	
2016	2	Jamie Vardy	Forward	(England) Leicester City	
2016	3	Wayne Rooney	Forward	(England) Manchester United	
2017	1	Harry Kane	Forward	(England) Tottenham Hotspur	
2018	1	Harry Kane	Forward	(England) Tottenham Hotspur	
2019	1	Jordan Henderson	Midfielder	(England) Liverpool	
2019	2	Raheem Sterling	Forward	(England) Manchester City	
2019	3	Harry Kane	Forward	(England) Tottenham Hotspur	
2020–21	1	Kalvin Phillips	Midfielder	(England) Leeds United	
2020–21	2	Mason Mount	Midfielder	(England) Chelsea	
2020–21	3	Raheem Sterling	Forward	(England) Manchester City	
2021–22	1	Bukayo Saka	Midfielder	(England) Arsenal	
2021–22	2	Declan Rice	Midfielder	(England) West Ham United	
2021–22	3	Harry Kane	Forward	(England) Tottenham Hotspur	
2022–23	1	Bukayo Saka	Midfielder	(England) Arsenal	
2022–23	2	Jude Bellingham	Midfielder	(Spain) Real Madrid	
2022–23	3	Harry Kane	Forward	(Germany) Bayern Munich	
2023–24	1	Cole Palmer	Midfielder	(England) Chelsea	
2023–24	2	Jude Bellingham	Midfielder	(Spain) Real Madrid	
2023–24	3	Bukayo Saka	Midfielder	(England) Arsenal	
2024–25	1	Jude Bellingham	Midfielder	(Spain) Real Madrid	
2024–25	2	Declan Rice	Midfielder	(England) Arsenal	
2024–25	3	Harry Kane	Forward	(Germany) Bayern Munich	
2025–26	1	Jude Bellingham	Midfielder	(Spain) Real Madrid	

=== By player ===
Player	Total	Years
Wayne Rooney	4	2008, 2009, 2014, 2015
Frank Lampard	2	2004, 2005
Steven Gerrard	2	2007, 2012
Harry Kane	2	2017, 2018
Bukayo Saka	2	2021–22, 2022–23
Jude Bellingham	2	2024–25, 2025–26
David Beckham	1	2003
Owen Hargreaves	1	2006
Ashley Cole	1	2010
Scott Parker	1	2011
Adam Lallana	1	2016
Jordan Henderson	1	2019
Kalvin Phillips	1	2020–21
Cole Palmer	1	2023–24

=== By club ===
Team	Total	Years
Manchester United	5	2003, 2008, 2009, 2014, 2015
Liverpool	4	2007, 2012, 2016, 2019
Chelsea	4	2004, 2005, 2010, 2023–24
Tottenham Hotspur	3	2011, 2017, 2018
Arsenal	2	2021–22, 2022–23
Real Madrid	2	2024–25, 2025–26
Bayern Munich	1	2006
Leeds United	1	2020–21

== Senior Women's Player of the Year ==
Year	Place	Player	Playing position	Club	Source
2019	1	Lucy Bronze	Defender	(France) Olympique Lyonnais	
2019	2	Ellen White	Forward	(England) Manchester City	
2019	3	Beth Mead	Forward	(England) Arsenal	
2020–21	1	Ellen White	Forward	(England) Manchester City	
2020–21	2	Alex Greenwood	Defender	(England) Manchester City	
2020–21	3	Bethany England	Forward	(England) Chelsea	
2021–22	1	Beth Mead	Forward	(England) Arsenal	
2021–22	2	Leah Williamson	Defender	(England) Arsenal	
2021–22	3	Keira Walsh	Midfielder	(Spain) Barcelona	
2022–23	1	Mary Earps	Goalkeeper	(England) Manchester United	
2022–23	2	Lucy Bronze	Defender	(Spain) Barcelona	
2022–23	3	Alex Greenwood	Defender	(England) Manchester City	
2023–24	1	Alessia Russo	Forward	(England) Arsenal	
2023–24	2	Lauren James	Midfielder	(England) Chelsea	
2023–24	3	Lucy Bronze	Defender	(England) Chelsea	
2024–25	1	Lucy Bronze	Defender	(England) Chelsea	
2024–25	2	Chloe Kelly	Forward	(England) Arsenal	
2024–25	3	Hannah Hampton	Goalkeeper	(England) Chelsea	
2025–26	1	Alessia Russo	Forward	(England) Arsenal	
2025–26	2	Lucy Bronze	Defender	(England) Chelsea	
2025–26	3	Hannah Hampton	Goalkeeper	(England) Chelsea	

=== By player ===
Player	Total	Years
Lucy Bronze	2	2019, 2024–25
Alessia Russo	2	2023–24, 2025–26
Ellen White	1	2020–21
Beth Mead	1	2021–22
Mary Earps	1	2022–23

=== By club ===
Team	Total	Years
Arsenal	3	2021–22, 2023–24, 2025–26
Manchester City	1	2020–21
Chelsea	1	2024–25
Olympique Lyonnais	1	2019
Manchester United	1	2022–23

== England Men's U21 Player of the Year ==
Year	Place	Player	Playing position	Club	Source
2012	1	Jordan Henderson	Midfielder	(England) Liverpool	
2012	2	Martin Kelly	Defender	(England) Liverpool	
2012	3	Wilfried Zaha	Midfielder	(England) Manchester United	
2014	1	Saido Berahino	Forward	(England) West Bromwich Albion	
2015	1	Jack Butland	Goalkeeper	(England) Stoke City	
2016	1	Nathan Redmond	Midfielder	(England) Southampton	
2016	2	James Ward-Prowse	Midfielder	(England) Southampton	
2017	1	Jordan Pickford	Goalkeeper	(England) Everton	
2018	1	Dominic Calvert-Lewin	Forward	(England) Everton	

== England Men's Youth Player of the Year ==
Year	Place	Player	Playing position	Club	Source
2012	1	Nathaniel Chalobah	Defender	(England) Watford (loan from Chelsea)	
2012	2	Will Hughes	Midfielder	(England) Derby County	
2012	3	John Lundstram	Midfielder	(England) Everton	
2014	1	Dominic Solanke	Forward	(England) Chelsea	

== Disability Player of the Year ==
Year	Place	Player	Playing position	Club	Source
2012	1	Ibrahima Diallo	Midfielder	(United Kingdom) Team GB 7-a-side	
2012	2	Daniel English	Defender	(United Kingdom) Team GB 5-a-side	
2012	3	Josh Pugh		England Partially Sighted Team	

== Club England Team of the Year ==
Year	Winner	Source
2012	England Women	

== England C Player of the Year ==
Year	Place	Player	Playing position	Club	Source
2012	1	Jamie Turley	Defender	(England) Forest Green Rovers	
2012	2	Scott Spencer	Striker	(England) Hyde	
2012	3	Kieron Forbes	Midfielder	(England) Forest Green Rovers	

== Lifetime achievement award ==
Year	Name	Team	Source
2012	David Clarke	(United Kingdom) Team GB	

== See also ==
- List of sports awards honoring women
