= 2010–11 Arsenal F.C. season =

English football club season

Arsenal
2010–11 season
- Chairman: Peter Hill-Wood
- Manager: Arsène Wenger
- Stadium: Emirates Stadium
- Premier League: 4th
- FA Cup: Sixth round
- League Cup: Runners-up
- UEFA Champions League: Round of 16
- Top goalscorer: League: Robin van Persie (18); All: Robin van Persie (22)
- Highest home attendance: 60,112 (vs. Chelsea, 27 December 2010, Premier League)
- Lowest home attendance: 58,845 (vs. Partizan, 8 December 2010, Champions League)
- Average home league attendance: 60,025
Home colours	Away colours

The 2010–11 season was Arsenal Football Club's 19th season in the Premier League and their 85th consecutive season in the top flight of English football. The team were within one point of league leaders Manchester United at the end of February, but a run of just one league win throughout the entirety of March and April ended their challenge. Arsenal's attempts to win the Champions League were ended once again by Barcelona, being beaten 4–3 on aggregate at the round of 16 stage after defeating them 2–1 at home, whilst hopes of winning the FA Cup were ended in the sixth round following a 2–0 defeat to Manchester United. The team came closest to silverware in the League Cup, reaching the final, only to concede a Birmingham City winner in the 89th minute.

== Key events ==
- 21 May: Striker Marouane Chamakh joins Arsenal on a free transfer from Bordeaux on a "long-term contract".
- 1 June: Midfielder Aaron Ramsey signs a new "long-term" deal with Arsenal.
- 1 June: Defenders Mikaël Silvestre and William Gallas leave Arsenal after failing to agree contract extensions.
- 8 June: Philippe Senderos joins Fulham on a free transfer.
- 7 July: Arsenal confirm the signing of French central defender Laurent Koscielny on a "long-term contract for an undisclosed fee" from Lorient.
- 21 July: Striker Eduardo joins Shakhtar Donetsk for an undisclosed fee after spending three years at Arsenal.
- 28 July: Defender Sol Campbell leaves Arsenal to join Newcastle United.
- 6 August: Arsenal captain Cesc Fàbregas commits his future to the club stating that he "will be 100 percent focused on playing for Arsenal", ending speculation that he will move to FC Barcelona in the current transfer window.
- 14 August: Arsenal manager Arsène Wenger signs a contract extension that will keep him at the club until June 2014.
- 26 August: French defender Sébastien Squillaci joins Arsenal from Sevilla FC on a three-year contract for £3.5 million.
- 1 November: Midfielder Jack Wilshere signs a new "long-term" deal with Arsenal.
- 11 November: Goalkeeper Wojciech Szczęsny signs a new "long-term" deal with Arsenal.
- 25 November: Midfielder Aaron Ramsey is sent on loan to Nottingham Forest for his recovery. The deal lasted until 3 January 2011.
- 31 December: Arsène Wenger confirms that defender Emmanuel Eboué signed a new "long-term" deal with Arsenal "one or two months ago".
- 1 January: Striker Ryo Miyaichi joins the club from Japan.
- 27 February: Arsenal lose to Birmingham City 1–2 in the League Cup Final at Wembley Stadium. On-form striker Robin van Persie damages knee ligament while scoring Arsenal's equaliser and is expected to miss at least three weeks.
- 11 April - Arsenal Holdings plc, the club's parent company, confirms that Stan Kroenke, who currently owns 29.9% of its shares, has agreed to purchase those of Danny Fiszman and Nina Bracewell-Smith to increase his shareholdings to 63%. This triggers a mandatory offer for the remaining shares, as required by the Takeover Code, an offer that values the club at £731 million, and one that the club's directors recommend fellow shareholders to accept.

== Players ==
=== Squad information ===
N	Pos.	Nat.	Name	Age	EU	Since	App	Goals	Ends	Transfer fee	Notes
1	GK	(Spain)	Manuel Almunia	34	EU	2004	175	0	undisclosed	£0.5M	
2	MF	(France)	Abou Diaby	25	EU	2006 (Winter)	158	19	undisclosed	£2.0M	
3	DF	(France)	Bacary Sagna	28	EU	2007	176	3	2014	€9M plus possible 2M in bonuses	
4	MF	(Spain)	Cesc Fàbregas (captain)	24	EU	2003	303	57	2014	Free	
5	DF	(Belgium)	Thomas Vermaelen	25	EU	2009	50	8	undisclosed	£10.0M	
6	DF	(France)	Laurent Koscielny	25	EU	2010	43	3	undisclosed	£8.5M	
7	MF	(Czech Republic)	Tomáš Rosický	30	EU	2006	128	17	undisclosed	£6.8M	
8	MF	(France)	Samir Nasri	23	EU	2008	124	27	2012	£12.0M	
10	ST	(Netherlands)	Robin van Persie (vice-captain)	27	EU	2004	230	95	2013	£2.75M	
11	ST	(Mexico)	Carlos Vela	22	EU	2005	62	11	undisclosed	£0.5M	On loan to West Bromwich Albion
13	GK	(Germany)	Jens Lehmann	41	EU	2011	200*	0	2011	Free	
14	MF	(England)	Theo Walcott	22	EU	2006 (Winter)	174	31	undisclosed	£9.1M	
15	MF	(Brazil)	Denílson	23	Non-EU	2006	153	10	undisclosed	£3.5M	
16	MF	(Wales)	Aaron Ramsey	20	EU	2008	59	6	undisclosed	£4.8M	
17	MF	(Cameroon)	Alex Song	23	EU	2005	158	9	2014	£1.0M	
18	DF	(France)	Sébastien Squillaci	30	EU	2010	32	2	2013	£3.3M	
19	MF	(England)	Jack Wilshere	19	EU	2008	64	3	undisclosed	Youth system	
20	DF	(Switzerland)	Johan Djourou	24	EU	2003	115	1	undisclosed	Youth system	
21	GK	(Poland)	Łukasz Fabiański	26	EU	2007	56	0	undisclosed	£2.0M	
22	DF	(France)	Gaël Clichy	25	EU	2003	264	2	2012	£0.25M	
23	MF	(Russia)	Andrey Arshavin	29	Non-EU	2009 (Winter)	106	28	2013	£15.0M	
24	GK	(Italy)	Vito Mannone	23	EU	2005	9	0	2014	£0.35M	On loan to Hull City
27	MF	(Ivory Coast)	Emmanuel Eboué	27	EU	2005 (Winter)	215	10	undisclosed	£1.54M	
28	DF	(England)	Kieran Gibbs	21	EU	2007	50	0	undisclosed	Youth system	
29	ST	(Morocco)	Marouane Chamakh	27	EU	2010	44	11	undisclosed	Free	
30	DF	(France)	Armand Traoré	21	EU	2005	30	0	undisclosed	Youth system	On loan to Juventus
35	MF	(England)	Emmanuel Frimpong	19	EU	2008	0	0	undisclosed	Youth system	
52	ST	(Denmark)	Nicklas Bendtner	23	EU	2004	156	45	undisclosed	Youth system	
53	GK	(Poland)	Wojciech Szczęsny	21	EU	2006	25	0	undisclosed	Youth system	

- Last updated: 22 May 2011
- Source: Arsenal F.C. and footballdatabase.com (for EU passport, country as international player, contract ending and transfer fee)
- Ordered by squad number.

* - Lehmann made 199 appearances during his first spell at Arsenal between 2003 and 2008.

=== Reserve squad ===
Note: Flags indicate national team as defined under FIFA eligibility rules; some limited exceptions apply. Players may hold more than one non-FIFA nationality.

No.	Pos.	Nation	Player
34	MF	ENG	Chuks Aneke
37	DF	GHA	Daniel Boateng
38	DF	ENG	Thomas Cruise
39	FW	ENG	Roarie Deacon
44	MF	IRL	Conor Henderson
45	DF	ENG	Gavin Hoyte
48	DF	ESP	Ignasi Miquel

No.	Pos.	Nation	Player
49	FW	ENG	Rhys Murphy
51	MF	TUR	Oğuzhan Özyakup
55	GK	ENG	James Shea
56	FW	ENG	Luke Freeman
58	DF	ENG	Nico Yennaris
59	GK	ARG	Emiliano Martínez

=== Transfers ===
==== In ====
#	Position	Player	Transferred from	Fee	Date	Team	Source
29	FW	(Morocco) Marouane Chamakh	(France) Bordeaux	Free transfer	21 May 2010	First-team	
	FW	(Republic of Ireland) Philip Roberts	(England) Norwich City	Free transfer	3 June 2010	Reserves	
	MF	(Netherlands) Kyle Ebecilio	(Netherlands) Feyenoord	Free transfer	17 June 2010	Reserves	
6	DF	(France) Laurent Koscielny	(France) Lorient	£8,500,000	7 July 2010	First-team	
18	DF	(France) Sébastien Squillaci	(Spain) Sevilla	£3,500,000	26 August 2010	First-team	
	FW	(Japan) Ryo Miyaichi	(Japan) Chukyodai Chukyo High School	Undisclosed	1 January 2011	Reserves	
	FW	(Brazil) Wellington	(Brazil) Fluminense	Undisclosed	6 January 2011	Reserves	
13	GK	(Germany) Jens Lehmann	Free agent	Free transfer	17 March 2011	First-team	

Total spending: ▼£12,000,000+

==== Out ====
#	Position	Player	Transferred to	Fee	Date	Source
46	DF	(England) Luke Ayling	(England) Yeovil Town	Free transfer	30 June 2010	
42	DF	(England) Kerrea Gilbert	(United States) Portland Timbers	Undisclosed	30 June 2010	
	DF	(England) Sam Byles	Unattached (Released)		Undisclosed	
	DF	(England) Rhema Obed	Free transfer (Released)		1 July 2010	
	GK	(England) James Dunn	Unattached (Released)		Undisclosed	
32	MF	(Spain) Fran Mérida	(Spain) Atlético Madrid	Free transfer	1 July 2010	
6	DF	(Switzerland) Philippe Senderos	(England) Fulham	Free transfer	1 July 2010	
10	DF	(France) William Gallas	(England) Tottenham Hotspur	Free transfer	1 July 2010	
18	DF	(France) Mikaël Silvestre	(Germany) Werder Bremen	Free transfer	1 July 2010	
31	DF	(England) Sol Campbell	(England) Newcastle United	Free transfer	1 July 2010	
9	FW	(Croatia) Eduardo	(Ukraine) Shakhtar Donetsk	£6,000,000	21 July 2010	
	FW	(England) Jay Simpson	(England) Hull City	Undisclosed	19 August 2010	
	DF	(Norway) Håvard Nordtveit	(Germany) Borussia Mönchengladbach	£800,000	30 December 2010	
39	DF	(Cameroon) Cedric Evina	(England) Oldham Athletic	Free transfer	28 January 2011	
33	MF	(Netherlands) Nacer Barazite	Austria Wien	Free transfer	31 January 2011	

Total income: ▲£6,800,000+

==== Loan out ====
Squad #	Position	Player	Loaned to	Date	Loan expires	Source
35	MF	(France) Francis Coquelin	(France) Lorient	21 June 2010	End of the season	
54	FW	(England) Sanchez Watt	(England) Leeds United	3 August 2010	End of the season	
34	DF	(England) Kyle Bartley	(England) Sheffield United	10 August 2010	31 January 2011	
	DF	(Brazil) Pedro Botelho	(Spain) Cartagena	13 August 2010	End of the season	
	MF	(Bolivia) Samuel Galindo	(Spain) Salamanca	13 August 2010	End of the season	
30	DF	(France) Armand Traoré	(Italy) Juventus	31 August 2010	End of the season	
24	GK	(Italy) Vito Mannone	(England) Hull City	18 October 2010	End of the season	
48	MF	(England) Mark Randall	(England) Rotherham United	23 October 2010	End of the season	
	FW	(England) Benik Afobe	(England) Huddersfield Town	2 November 2010	End of the season	
45	MF	(England) Henri Lansbury	(England) Norwich City	22 November 2010	End of the season	
16	MF	(Wales) Aaron Ramsey	(England) Nottingham Forest	25 November 2010	3 January 2011	
	FW	(Brazil) Wellington	(Spain) Levante	12 January 2011	End of the season	
	FW	(Japan) Ryo Miyaichi	(Netherlands) Feyenoord	18 January 2011	End of the season	
41	MF	(England) Jay Emmanuel-Thomas	(Wales) Cardiff City	18 January 2011	End of the season	
16	MF	(Wales) Aaron Ramsey	(Wales) Cardiff City	21 January 2011	26 February 2011	
40	MF	(England) Craig Eastmond	(England) Millwall	25 January 2011	End of the season	
11	FW	(Mexico) Carlos Vela	(England) West Bromwich Albion	28 January 2011	End of the season	
51	FW	(France) Gilles Sunu	(France) Lorient	31 January 2011	End of the season	
34	DF	(England) Kyle Bartley	(Scotland) Rangers	31 January 2011	End of the season	

==== Overall transfer activity ====
Spending
▼£12 million

Income
▲£6.8 million

Net expenditure
▼£5.2 million

=== Appearances and goals ===
No.	Pos	Nat	Player	Total		Premier League		FA Cup		League Cup		Champions League	
No.	Pos	Nat	Player	Apps	Goals	Apps	Goals	Apps	Goals	Apps	Goals	Apps	Goals
1	GK	(Spain) ESP	Manuel Almunia	14	0	8	0	4	0	0	0	1+1	0
2	MF	(France) FRA	Abou Diaby	20	2	13+3	2	3	0	0	0	1	0
3	DF	(France) FRA	Bacary Sagna	43	2	33	1	3	1	2+1	0	4	0
4	MF	(Spain) ESP	Cesc Fàbregas	36	9	22+3	3	0+3	2	2+1	1	5	3
5	DF	(Belgium) BEL	Thomas Vermaelen	5	0	5	0	0	0	0	0	0	0
6	DF	(France) FRA	Laurent Koscielny	43	3	30	2	3	0	6	1	4	0
7	MF	(Czech Republic) CZE	Tomáš Rosický	34	1	8+13	0	3+2	1	3	0	5	0
8	MF	(France) FRA	Samir Nasri	46	15	28+2	10	3+1	1	2+2	2	6+2	2
10	FW	(Netherlands) NED	Robin van Persie	33	22	19+6	18	1+1	1	3	1	3	2
11	FW	(Mexico) MEX	Carlos Vela	13	3	0+4	1	0+1	0	3+1	0	0+4	2
13	GK	(Germany) GER	Jens Lehmann	1	0	1	0	0	0	0	0	0	0
14	FW	(England) ENG	Theo Walcott	38	13	19+9	9	0+1	0	3+1	2	3+2	2
15	MF	(Brazil) BRA	Denílson	32	0	6+10	0	6	0	5	0	3+2	0
16	MF	(Wales) WAL	Aaron Ramsey	8	1	5+2	1	0+1	0	0	0	0	0
17	MF	(Cameroon) CMR	Alex Song	42	5	30+1	4	3+1	0	1+1	0	5	1
18	DF	(France) FRA	Sébastien Squillaci	32	2	20+2	1	4	0	0	0	6	1
19	MF	(England) ENG	Jack Wilshere	49	2	31+4	1	1+1	0	5	0	7	1
20	DF	(Switzerland) SUI	Johan Djourou	37	1	20+2	1	3	0	6	0	6	0
21	GK	(Poland) POL	Łukasz Fabiański	20	0	14	0	0	0	1	0	5	0
22	DF	(France) FRA	Gaël Clichy	44	1	33	0	0+2	1	2+1	0	5+1	0
23	MF	(Russia) RUS	Andrey Arshavin	52	10	25+12	6	5	0	3+1	1	3+3	3
24	GK	(Italy) ITA	Vito Mannone	0	0	0	0	0	0	0	0	0	0
27	DF	(Ivory Coast) CIV	Emmanuel Eboué	27	1	8+5	1	3	0	4+1	0	4+2	0
28	DF	(England) ENG	Kieran Gibbs	20	0	4+3	0	6	0	4	0	3	0
29	FW	(Morocco) MAR	Marouane Chamakh	44	11	18+11	7	5+1	1	0+3	0	4+2	3
30	DF	(France) FRA	Armand Traoré	0	0	0	0	0	0	0	0	0	0
40	DF	(England) ENG	Craig Eastmond	3	0	0	0	0	0	1+1	0	1	0
41	MF	(England) ENG	Jay Emmanuel-Thomas	4	0	0+1	0	0	0	0+2	0	0+1	0
44	MF	(Republic of Ireland) IRL	Conor Henderson	1	0	0	0	1	0	0	0	0	0
46	MF	(England) ENG	Henri Lansbury	1	1	0	0	0	0	1	1	0	0
48	DF	(Spain) ESP	Ignasi Miquel	2	0	0	0	2	0	0	0	0	0
52	FW	(Denmark) DEN	Nicklas Bendtner	32	9	3+14	2	5	4	4+1	3	2+3	0
53	GK	(Poland) POL	Wojciech Szczęsny	24	0	15	0	2	0	5	0	2	0

Source: Arsenal F.C.

=== Disciplinary record ===
N	Pos.	Nat.	Name	Yellow card	Second yellow card	Red card	Notes
3	DF	(France)	Sagna	6	0	2	
6	DF	(France)	Koscielny	10	1	1	
19	MF	(England)	Wilshere	8	0	1	
18	DF	(France)	Squillaci	1	0	1	
2	MF	(France)	Diaby	1	0	1	
17	MF	(Cameroon)	Song	9	1	0	
10	FW	(Netherlands)	v. Persie	6	1	0	
15	MF	(Brazil)	Denílson	7	0	0	
4	MF	(Spain)	Fàbregas	6	0	0	
22	DF	(France)	Clichy	6	0	0	
27	DF	(Ivory Coast)	Eboué	6	0	0	
7	MF	(Czech Republic)	Rosický	5	0	0	
29	FW	(Morocco)	Chamakh	5	0	0	
8	MF	(France)	Nasri	4	0	0	
20	DF	(Switzerland)	Djourou	4	0	0	
28	DF	(England)	Gibbs	2	0	0	
11	FW	(Mexico)	Vela	2	0	0	
52	FW	(Denmark)	Bendtner	2	0	0	
1	GK	(Spain)	Almunia	1	0	0	
23	MF	(Russia)	Arshavin	1	0	0	
46	MF	(England)	Lansbury	1	0	0	
53	GK	(Poland)	Szczęsny	1	0	0	
16	MF	(Wales)	Ramsey	1	0	0	

Last updated: 22 May 2011
Source: Match reports in Competitive matches
Only competitive matches
(yellow card) = Number of bookings; (second yellow card) = Number of sending offs after a second yellow card; (red card) = Number of sending offs by a direct red card.

== Club ==
=== Coaching staff ===
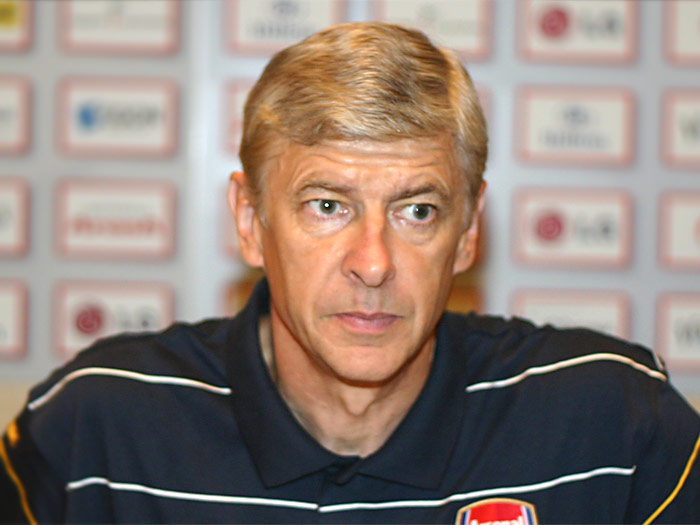
This is Arsène Wenger's 15th season with Arsenal.

Position	Staff
Manager	(France) Arsène Wenger
Assistant manager	(Northern Ireland) Pat Rice
First team coach	(Bosnia and Herzegovina) Boro Primorac
Goalkeeping coach	(Republic of Ireland) Gerry Peyton
Fitness coach	(England) Tony Colbert
Physiotherapist	(England) Colin Lewin
Club doctor	(Republic of Ireland) Gary O'Driscoll
Chief scout	(England) Steve Rowley

Last updated: 11 May 2010
Source: Arsenal F.C.

=== Kit ===
Supplier: Nike / Sponsor: Fly Emirates

Home	Home alt.	Away	Away alt.	Away alt. 2	Goalkeeper 1	Goalkeeper 2	Goalkeeper 3	Goalkeeper 4

=== Kit information ===
Nike released a new set of kits for the 2010–11 season.

- Home: After the controversial home kit of the last two seasons which ditched Arsenal's iconic white sleeves, the club returned to their traditional design. The kit was inspired by the home kits used in 1970s, which featured a white round neck collar.
- Away: Arsenal's away kit combined the club's traditional yellow away colour with maroon, a shade similar to the club's original kits. The kit featured maroon pinstripes and V-neck with maroon shorts and hooped socks.
- Keeper: Arsenal goalkeepers wore four different kits throughout the season. The most conspicuous feature of the kits were the black zig-zags on the arms, based on the template Nike used in 2010 for its main clubs. The primary kit was grey, while the alternatives were black, turquoise and pink.

=== Other information ===
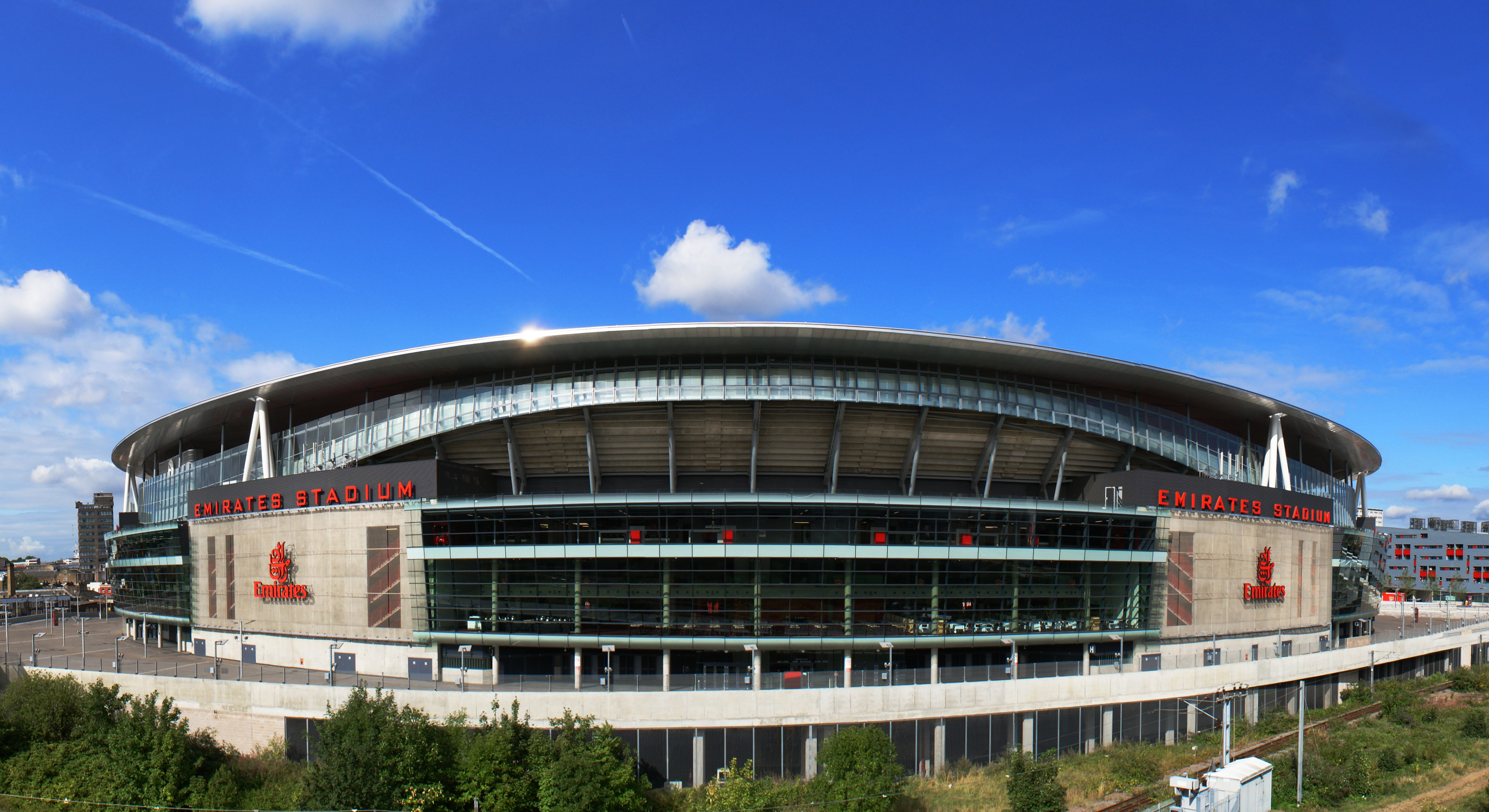
The Emirates Stadium is the second largest stadium in the Premier League.

Chairman	(England) Peter Hill-Wood
Ground (capacity and dimensions)	Emirates Stadium (60,355 / 113x76 metres)

Updated to match played 11 May 2010
Source: Arsenal F.C.

== Competitions ==
=== Overall ===
Competition	Started round	Final position / round	First match	Last match
Premier League	—	4th	15 August 2010	22 May 2011
UEFA Champions League	Group stage	Round of 16	15 September 2010	8 March 2011
Football League Cup	3rd round	Runners-up	21 September 2010	27 February 2011
FA Cup	3rd round	Sixth round	8 January 2011	12 March 2011

Updated to match played 22 May 2011
Source: Competitions

=== Pre-season ===
17 July 2010 Friendly	Barnet	0–4	Arsenal	London
15:00 BST		Report	Arshavin 2'; Simpson 16', 45'; Nasri 75'	Stadium: Underhill Stadium; Attendance: 5,701

21 July 2010 Friendly	SK Sturm Graz (Austria)	0–3	(England) Arsenal	Graz, Austria
19:00 CEST		Report	Nasri 16', 43'; Lansbury 57'; Wilshere (yellow card) 45'	Stadium: UPC-Arena; Attendance: 9,021

27 July 2010 Friendly	SC Neusiedl 1919 (Austria)	0–4	(England) Arsenal	Neusiedl am See, Austria
19:00 CEST		Report	Walcott 28'; Emmanuel-Thomas 30'; Chamakh 51' (pen.); Vela 65'	Stadium: Sportzentrum Neusiedl; Attendance: 4,000

31 July 2010 Emirates Cup	Arsenal (England)	1–1	(Italy) Milan	London
16:20 BST	Chamakh 36'	Report	Pato 77'	Stadium: Emirates Stadium; Attendance: 60,012; Referee: Chris Foy

1 August 2010 Emirates Cup	Arsenal (England)	3–2	(Scotland) Celtic	London
16:20 BST	Vela 3'; Sagna 45'; Nasri 51'	Report	Murphy 72'; Ki 83'	Stadium: Emirates Stadium; Attendance: 59,727; Referee: Andre Marriner

7 August 2010 Friendly	Legia Warsaw (Poland)	5–6	(England) Arsenal	Warsaw, Poland
17:00 CEST	Cabral 17'; Koscielny 33' (o.g.); Jędrzejczyk 36', 75'; Iwański 90'	Report	Chamakh 38'; Eboué 52', 60'; Gibbs 64'; Emmanuel-Thomas 81'; Nasri 84'	Stadium: Stadion Wojska Polskiego

Last updated: 7 August 2010
Source: Arsenal F.C.

=== Premier League ===
==== League table ====
Pos	Team	Pld	W	D	L	GF	GA	GD	Pts	Qualification or relegation
2	Chelsea	38	21	8	9	69	33	+36	71	Qualification for the Champions League group stage
3	Manchester City	38	21	8	9	60	33	+27	71	Qualification for the Champions League group stage
4	Arsenal	38	19	11	8	72	43	+29	68	Qualification for the Champions League play-off round
5	Tottenham Hotspur	38	16	14	8	55	46	+9	62	Qualification for the Europa League play-off round
6	Liverpool	38	17	7	14	59	44	+15	58	

Source: Barclays Premier League
Rules for classification: 1) points; 2) goal difference; 3) number of goals scored.

==== Results summary ====
Overall								Home						Away					
Pld	W	D	L	GF	GA	GD	Pts	W	D	L	GF	GA	GD	W	D	L	GF	GA	GD
38	19	11	8	72	43	+29	68	11	4	4	33	15	+18	8	7	4	39	28	+11

Last updated: 22 May 2011.
Source: Premier League

==== Results by round ====
Round	1	2	3	4	5	6	7	8	9	10	11	12	13	14	15	16	17	18	19	20	21	22	23	24	25	26	27	28	29	30	31	32	33	34	35	36	37	38
Ground	A	H	A	H	A	H	A	H	A	H	H	A	A	H	A	H	A	H	A	A	H	A	H	H	A	H	H	H	A	H	A	H	A	A	H	A	H	A
Result	D	W	W	W	D	L	L	W	W	W	L	W	W	L	W	W	L	W	D	W	D	W	W	W	D	W	W	D	D	D	W	D	D	L	W	L	L	D
Position	9	2	2	2	2	3	4	3	2	2	3	3	2	3	3	1	2	2	3	3	3	3	2	2	2	2	2	2	2	2	2	2	3	3	3	3	4	4

Updated to match(es) played on 22 May 2011. Source: Competitive Matches
A = Away; H = Home; W = Win; D = Draw; L = Loss

==== Matches ====
15 August 2010 1	Liverpool	1–1	Arsenal	Liverpool
16:00 BST	Ngog 46'; Cole (red card) 45'; Gerrard (yellow card) 75'	Report	(yellow card) 41' Wilshere; (yellow card) 85' Rosický; 90+1' (o.g.) Reina; (yellow card) 90+2' (yellow-red card) 90+5' Koscielny	Stadium: Anfield; Attendance: 44,722; Referee: Martin Atkinson

21 August 2010 2	Arsenal	6–0	Blackpool	London
15:00 BST	Walcott 12', 39', 58'; Arshavin 32' (pen.); Diaby 49'; Chamakh 84'	Report	(red card) 31' Evatt	Stadium: Emirates Stadium; Attendance: 60,032; Referee: Mike Jones

28 August 2010 3	Blackburn Rovers	1–2	Arsenal	Blackburn
12:45 BST	M. Diouf 27'; Givet (yellow card) 74'	Report	20' Walcott; 51' Arshavin	Stadium: Ewood Park; Attendance: 25,059; Referee: Chris Foy

11 September 2010 4	Arsenal	4–1	Bolton Wanderers	London
15:00 BST	Koscielny 24'; Eboué (yellow card) 37'; Chamakh 62'; Gibbs (yellow card) 62'; Song 78'; Vela 83'	Report	(yellow card) 18' Davies; 44' Elmander; (yellow card) 53' Steinsson; (red card) 63' Cahill	Stadium: Emirates Stadium; Attendance: 59,876; Referee: Stuart Attwell

18 September 2010 5	Sunderland	1–1	Arsenal	Sunderland
17:30 BST	Welbeck (yellow card) 48'; Riveros (yellow card) 63'; Malbranque (yellow card) 84'; Bent 90+5'	Report	13' Fàbregas; (yellow card) 28' Wilshere; (yellow card) 38' (yellow-red card) 55' Song	Stadium: Stadium of Light; Attendance: 38,950; Referee: Phil Dowd

25 September 2010 6	Arsenal	2–3	West Bromwich Albion	London
15:00 BST	Almunia (yellow card) 37'; Koscielny (yellow card) 52'; Chamakh (yellow card) 63'; Nasri 75', 90+1'; Rosický (yellow card) 80'	Report	(yellow card) 9' Olsson; 50' Odemwingie; 52', (yellow card) 53' Jara; (yellow card) 68' Scharner; 73' Thomas	Stadium: Emirates Stadium; Attendance: 60,025; Referee: Michael Oliver

3 October 2010 7	Chelsea	2–0	Arsenal	London
16:00 BST	Drogba 39'; Ferreira (yellow card) 80'; Alex 85'	Report	(yellow card) 84' Koscielny	Stadium: Stamford Bridge; Attendance: 41,828; Referee: Mike Dean

16 October 2010 8	Arsenal	2–1	Birmingham City	London
15:00 BST	Nasri 41' (pen.), (yellow card) 43'; Chamakh 47'; Eboué (yellow card) 77'; Wilshere (red card) 90+3'	Report	33' Žigić; (yellow card) 54' Bowyer; (yellow card) 72' Carr	Stadium: Emirates Stadium; Attendance: 60,070; Referee: Martin Atkinson

24 October 2010 9	Manchester City	0–3	Arsenal	Manchester
16:00 BST	Boyata (red card) 5'; Barry (yellow card) 13'; Kompany (yellow card) 72'	Report	Denílson (yellow card) 8'; Nasri 20'; Fàbregas (yellow card) 28'; Song (yellow card) 33', (goal) 66'; Djourou (yellow card) 36'; Bendtner 88'	Stadium: City of Manchester Stadium; Attendance: 47,393; Referee: Mark Clattenburg

30 October 2010 10	Arsenal	1–0	West Ham United	London
15:00 BST	Song (yellow card) 25', (goal) 88'; Chamakh (yellow card) 82'	Report	Ilunga (yellow card) 23'; Boa Morte (yellow card) 52'	Stadium: Emirates Stadium; Attendance: 60,086; Referee: Mike Jones

7 November 2010 11	Arsenal	0–1	Newcastle United	London
13:30 GMT	Clichy (yellow card) 23'; Fàbregas (yellow card) 69'; Koscielny (red card) 90+2'; Sagna (yellow card) 90+3'	Report	(yellow card) 32' Tioté; 45' Carroll	Stadium: Emirates Stadium; Attendance: 60,059; Referee: Mike Dean

10 November 2010 12	Wolverhampton Wanderers	0–2	Arsenal	Wolverhampton
19:45 GMT	Stearman (yellow card) 86'	Report	1', 90+4' Chamakh; (yellow card) 73' Denílson; (yellow card) 88' Fàbregas	Stadium: Molineux Stadium; Attendance: 27,329; Referee: Mark Halsey

14 November 2010 13	Everton	1–2	Arsenal	Liverpool
14:00 GMT	Heitinga (yellow card) 26'; Cahill 89'; Coleman (yellow card) 90+3'	Report	36' Sagna; 48', (yellow card) 52' Fàbregas; (yellow card) 49' Squillaci	Stadium: Goodison Park; Attendance: 36,279; Referee: Howard Webb

20 November 2010 14	Arsenal	2–3	Tottenham Hotspur	London
12:45 GMT	Nasri 9'; Sagna (yellow card) 13'; Chamakh 27'; Denílson (yellow card) 81'; Koscielny (yellow card) 85'	Report	50' Bale; 67' (pen.), (yellow card) 68' Van der Vaart; 86' Kaboul	Stadium: Emirates Stadium; Attendance: 60,102; Referee: Phil Dowd

27 November 2010 15	Aston Villa	2–4	Arsenal	Birmingham
12:45 GMT	Clark 52', 70' (yellow card) 53'	Report	39' Arshavin; 45' Nasri; 56', (yellow card) 77' Chamakh; 90+3' Wilshere	Stadium: Villa Park; Attendance: 38,544; Referee: Mark Clattenburg

4 December 2010 16	Arsenal	2–1	Fulham	London
15:00 GMT	Nasri 14', 75'	Report	30' Kamara	Stadium: Emirates Stadium; Attendance: 60,049; Referee: Chris Foy

13 December 2010 17	Manchester United	1–0	Arsenal	Manchester
20:00 GMT	Park 41'	Report	(yellow card) 44' Chamakh; (yellow card) 45+2' Arshavin; (yellow card) 73' Clichy; (yellow card) 85' Song	Stadium: Old Trafford; Attendance: 75,227; Referee: Howard Webb

27 December 2010 18	Arsenal	3–1	Chelsea	London
20:00 GMT	Van Persie (yellow card) 33'; Song 44'; Fàbregas 51', (yellow card) 68'; Walcott 53'	Report	57' Ivanović; (yellow card) 29' Cole; (yellow card) 39' Kalou; (yellow card) 59' Lampard	Stadium: Emirates Stadium; Attendance: 60,112; Referee: Mark Clattenburg

29 December 2010 19	Wigan Athletic	2–2	Arsenal	Wigan
19:45 GMT	Watson 18' (pen.); Caldwell (yellow card) 74'; N'Zogbia (red card) 78'; Squillaci 81' (o.g.)	Report	39' Arshavin; 44' Bendtner	Stadium: DW Stadium; Attendance: 17,014; Referee: Lee Probert

1 January 2011 20	Birmingham City	0–3	Arsenal	Birmingham
17:30 GMT	Johnson (yellow card) 8'; Ridgewell (yellow card) 28'; Dann (yellow card) 51'	Report	13' Van Persie; (yellow card) 34' Djourou; 58' Nasri; 66' (o.g.) Johnson	Stadium: St Andrew's; Attendance: 24,341; Referee: Peter Walton

5 January 2011 21	Arsenal	0–0	Manchester City	London
19:45 GMT	Sagna (red card) 90'	Report	(yellow card) 21' Barry; (yellow card) 29' De Jong; (red card) 90' Zabaleta	Stadium: Emirates Stadium; Attendance: 60,085; Referee: Mike Jones

15 January 2011 22	West Ham United	0–3	Arsenal	London
17:30 GMT	Faubert (yellow card) 15'	Report	13', 77' (pen.) Van Persie; 41' Walcott	Stadium: Boleyn Ground; Attendance: 33,000; Referee: Andre Marriner

22 January 2011 23	Arsenal	3–0	Wigan Athletic	London
15:00 GMT	Van Persie 21', 58', 85'	Report	(yellow card) 67' Thomas; (red card) 70' Caldwell	Stadium: Emirates Stadium; Attendance: 59,552; Referee: Kevin Friend

1 February 2011 24	Arsenal	2–1	Everton	London
19:45 GMT	Wilshere (yellow card) 5'; Rosický (yellow card) 45'; Van Persie (yellow card) 60'; Arshavin 70'; Koscielny 75'	Report	(yellow card) 14' Distin; 24' Saha; (yellow card) 46' Rodwell; (yellow card) 59' Arteta; (yellow card) 71' Howard; (yellow card) 74' Osman	Stadium: Emirates Stadium; Attendance: 60,014; Referee: Lee Mason

5 February 2011 25	Newcastle United	4–4	Arsenal	Newcastle
15:00 GMT	Barton 68' (pen.), 83' (pen.); Nolan (yellow card) 70'; Best 75'; Tioté 87'; José Enrique (yellow card) 90+4'	Report	1' Walcott; 3' Djourou; 10', 26' Van Persie; (red card) 50' Diaby; (yellow card) 69' Szczęsny; (yellow card) 82' Sagna; (yellow card) 82' Eboué	Stadium: St James' Park; Attendance: 51,561; Referee: Phil Dowd

12 February 2011 26	Arsenal	2–0	Wolverhampton Wanderers	London
15:00 GMT	Van Persie 16', 56'	Report	(yellow card) 42' Zubar	Stadium: Emirates Stadium; Attendance: 60,050; Referee: Chris Foy

23 February 2011 27	Arsenal	1–0	Stoke City	London
19:45 GMT	Squillaci 8'; Clichy (yellow card) 55'	Report	(yellow card) 43' Walters; (yellow card) 84' Wilson	Stadium: Emirates Stadium; Attendance: 60,041; Referee: Peter Walton

5 March 2011 28	Arsenal	0–0	Sunderland	London
15:00 GMT	Wilshere (yellow card) 65'; Koscielny (yellow card) 82'; Nasri (yellow card) 85'	Report	(yellow card) 23' Richardson; (yellow card) 59' Henderson; (yellow card) 90+3' Colback	Stadium: Emirates Stadium; Attendance: 60,081; Referee: Anthony Taylor

19 March 2011 29	West Bromwich Albion	2–2	Arsenal	West Bromwich
15:00 GMT	Reid 3'; Méïté (yellow card) 18'; Odemwingie 58'	Report	(yellow card) 37' Denílson; (yellow card) 61' Koscielny; 70' Arshavin; 78' Van Persie; (yellow card) 81' Nasri	Stadium: The Hawthorns; Attendance: 25,729; Referee: Stuart Attwell

2 April 2011 30	Arsenal	0–0	Blackburn Rovers	London
17:30 BST	Song (yellow card) 53'	Report	(yellow card) 30' Hoilett; (yellow card) 39' Salgado; (red card) 76' Nzonzi	Stadium: Emirates Stadium; Attendance: 60,087; Referee: Phil Dowd

10 April 2011 31	Blackpool	1–3	Arsenal	Blackpool
13:30 BST	Taylor-Fletcher 52'; Southern (yellow card) 64'; Crainey (yellow card) 69'	Report	18', (yellow card) 45+1' Diaby; 21' Eboué; (yellow card) 53' Wilshere; 76' Van Persie	Stadium: Bloomfield Road; Attendance: 16,030; Referee: Lee Mason

17 April 2011 32	Arsenal	1–1	Liverpool	London
16:00 BST	Van Persie 90+8' (pen.), (yellow card) 90+9'; Eboué (yellow card) 90+10'	Report	(yellow card) 30' Flanagan; (yellow card) 33' Škrtel; (yellow card) 76' Shelvey; (yellow card) 90+10' Lucas; 90+12' (pen.) Kuyt	Stadium: Emirates Stadium; Attendance: 60,029; Referee: Andre Marriner

20 April 2011 33	Tottenham Hotspur	3–3	Arsenal	London
19:45 BST	Van der Vaart 7', 70' (pen.); Huddlestone 44'	Report	5' Walcott; 12' Nasri; 40' Van Persie; (yellow card) 45+4' Clichy; (yellow card) 46' Song; (yellow card) 47' Djourou	Stadium: White Hart Lane; Attendance: 36,138; Referee: Martin Atkinson

24 April 2011 34	Bolton Wanderers	2–1	Arsenal	Bolton
16:00 BST	Muamba (yellow card) 8'; Taylor (yellow card) 20'; Sturridge 38'; Davies (yellow card) 88'; Cohen 90'	Report	48' Van Persie; (yellow card) 53' Song; (yellow card) 64' Wilshere; (yellow card) 80' Chamakh	Stadium: Reebok Stadium; Attendance: 26,881; Referee: Mike Jones

1 May 2011 35	Arsenal	1–0	Manchester United	London
14:05 BST	Ramsey 56', (yellow card) 90+4'; Song (yellow card) 63'	Report	(yellow card) 40' Rooney; (yellow card) 66' Park; (yellow card) 76' Fabio	Stadium: Emirates Stadium; Attendance: 60,107; Referee: Chris Foy

8 May 2011 36	Stoke City	3–1	Arsenal	Stoke-on-Trent
14:05 BST	Jones 28'; Pennant 40', (yellow card) 71'; Walters 82'	Report	(yellow card) 61' Bendtner; (yellow card) 71' Wilshere; 81' Van Persie	Stadium: Britannia Stadium; Attendance: 27,478; Referee: Mark Halsey

15 May 2011 37	Arsenal	1–2	Aston Villa	London
16:00 BST	Bendtner (yellow card) 77'; Van Persie 89'	Report	11', 15' Bent; (yellow card) 25' Reo-Coker; (yellow card) 35' Petrov; (yellow card) 64' Dunne; (yellow card) 90' Young	Stadium: Emirates Stadium; Attendance: 60,023; Referee: Michael Oliver

22 May 2011 38	Fulham	2–2	Arsenal	London
16:00 BST	Sidwell 26' (yellow card) 77'; Greening (yellow card) 55'; Zamora 57'; Gera (red card) 75'	Report	29', (yellow card) 49' Van Persie; 89' Walcott	Stadium: Craven Cottage; Attendance: 25,674; Referee: Martin Atkinson

Last updated: 22 May 2011
Note: Premier League fixture not listed due to copyright. Results will be shown.
Source: Arsenal F.C.

=== UEFA Champions League ===
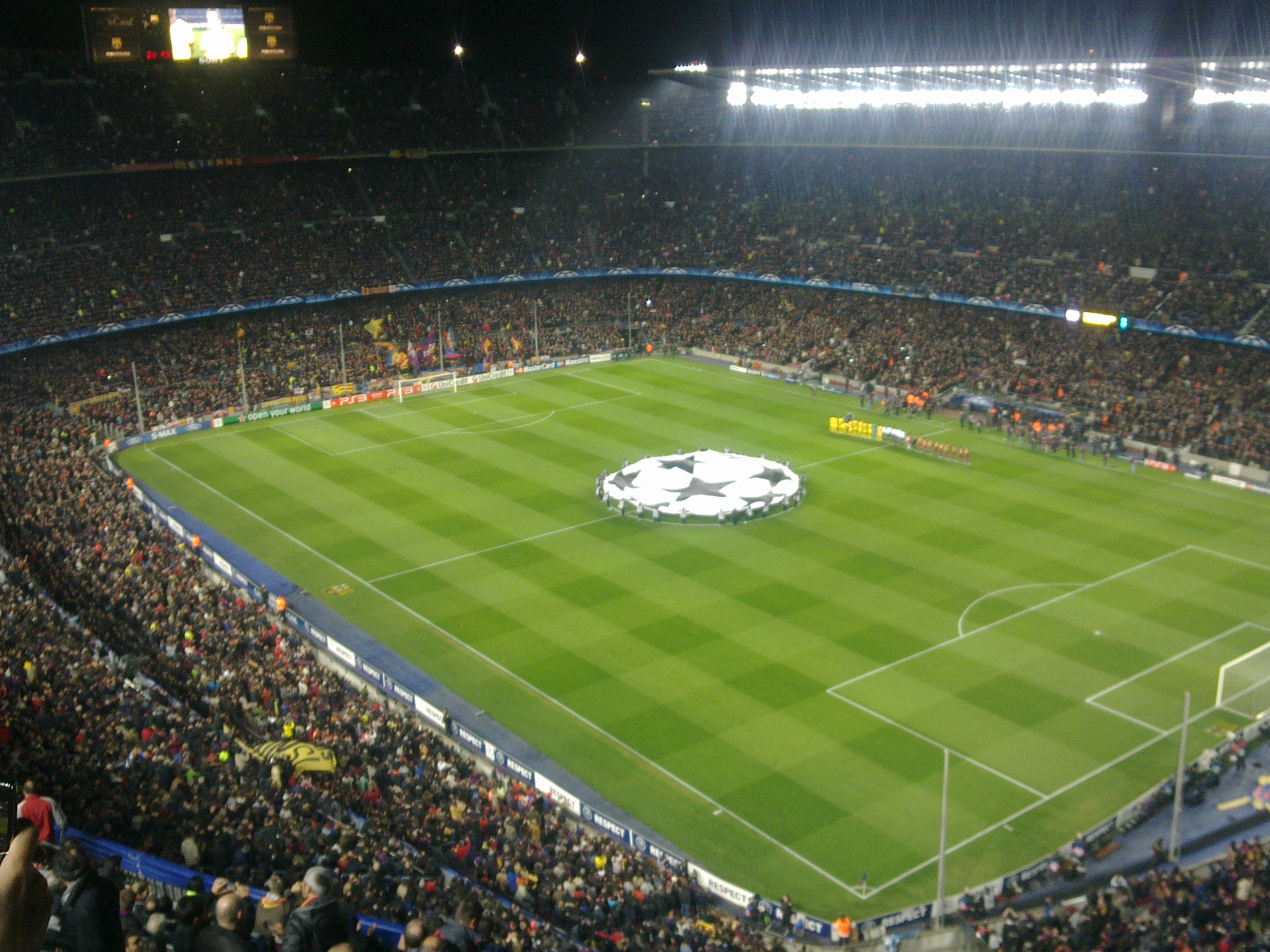
Arsenal and Barcelona line up at the Nou Camp on 8 March 2011

==== Group stage ====
Pos	Team	Pld	W	D	L	GF	GA	GD	Pts	Qualification
1	(Ukraine) Shakhtar Donetsk	6	5	0	1	12	6	+6	15	Advance to knockout phase
2	(England) Arsenal	6	4	0	2	18	7	+11	12	Advance to knockout phase
3	(Portugal) Braga	6	3	0	3	5	11	−6	9	Transfer to Europa League
4	(Serbia) Partizan	6	0	0	6	2	13	−11	0	

Source: Soccerway

15 September 2010 1	Arsenal (England)	6–0	(Portugal) Braga	London
19:45 BST	Fàbregas 9' (pen.), 53'; Arshavin 30'; Chamakh 34'; Sagna (yellow card) 64'; Vela 69', 84'	Report	(yellow card) 8' Felipe; (yellow card) 20' Rodríguez	Stadium: Emirates Stadium; Attendance: 59,333; Referee: Alain Hamer (Luxembourg)

28 September 2010 2	Partizan (Serbia)	1–3	(England) Arsenal	Belgrade, Serbia
20:45 CEST	Cléo 33' (pen.); Jovanović (red card) 56'; Ilić (yellow card) 59'	Report	15' Arshavin; 71' Chamakh; 82' Squillaci	Stadium: Stadion FK Partizan; Attendance: 25,000; Referee: Wolfgang Stark (Germany)

19 October 2010 3	Arsenal (England)	5–1	(Ukraine) Shakhtar Donetsk	London
19:45 BST	Song 19'; Nasri 42'; Fàbregas 60' (pen.); Wilshere 66'; Chamakh 69'	Report	(yellow card) 58' Hübschman; (yellow card) 59' Luiz Adriano; 82' Eduardo	Stadium: Emirates Stadium; Attendance: 60,016; Referee: Svein Oddvar Moen (Norway)

3 November 2010 4	Shakhtar Donetsk (Ukraine)	2–1	(England) Arsenal	Donetsk, Ukraine
21:45 EET	Eastmond 28' (o.g.); Eduardo 45'; Hübschman (yellow card) 27'; Gai (yellow card) 47'; Raț (yellow card) 83'	Report	10' Walcott; (yellow card) 27' Eboué	Stadium: Donbas Arena; Attendance: 48,765; Referee: Massimo Busacca (Switzerland)

23 November 2010 5	Braga (Portugal)	2–0	(England) Arsenal	Braga, Portugal
19:45 WET	Aguiar (yellow card) 55'; Garcia (yellow card) 79'; Matheus 83', 90+3'	Report	(yellow card) 38' Eboué; (yellow card) 70' Denílson; (yellow card) 74' Djourou; (yellow card) 77' Vela; (yellow card) 85' Rosický	Stadium: Estádio AXA; Attendance: 25,000; Referee: Viktor Kassai (Hungary)

8 December 2010 6	Arsenal (England)	3–1	(Serbia) Partizan	London
19:45 GMT	Van Persie 30' (pen.); Walcott 73'; Nasri 77'; Sagna (red card) 86'	Report	52' Cléo; (yellow card) 70' Krstajić	Stadium: Emirates Stadium; Attendance: 58,845; Referee: Paolo Tagliavento (Italy)

==== Knockout phase ====
===== Round of 16 =====
16 February 2011 First leg	Arsenal (England)	2–1	(Spain) Barcelona	London
19:45 GMT	Song (yellow card) 7'; Nasri (yellow card) 28'; Van Persie 78', (yellow card) 86'; Arshavin 83'	Report	26' Villa; (yellow card) 30' Iniesta; (yellow card) 59' Piqué	Stadium: Emirates Stadium; Attendance: 59,927; Referee: Nicola Rizzoli (Italy)

8 March 2011 Second leg	Barcelona (Spain)	3–1 (4–3 agg.)	(England) Arsenal	Barcelona, Spain
19:45 WET	Messi 45+3', 71' (pen.); Xavi 69'	Report	(yellow card) 16' Koscielny; (yellow card) 29' Sagna; (yellow card) 37' Wilshere; 53' (o.g.) Busquets; (yellow card) 45+1' (yellow-red card) 56' Van Persie	Stadium: Camp Nou; Attendance: 95,486; Referee: Massimo Busacca (Switzerland)

Last updated: 8 March 2011
Source: Arsenal F.C.

=== FA Cup ===
8 January 2011 Third round	Arsenal	1–1	Leeds United	London
12:45 GMT	Rosický (yellow card) 42'; Denílson (yellow card) 79'; Fàbregas 90' (pen.)	Report	(yellow card) 26' Parker; 54' (pen.) Snodgrass; (yellow card) 77' Howson	Stadium: Emirates Stadium; Attendance: 59,520; Referee: Phil Dowd

19 January 2011 Third round replay	Leeds United	1–3	Arsenal	Leeds
20:00 GMT	Johnson 37' (yellow card) 88'; Snodgrass (yellow card) 84'; Howson (yellow card) 90+3'	Report	5' Nasri; 35' Sagna; 76' Van Persie	Stadium: Elland Road; Attendance: 38,232; Referee: Mike Dean

30 January 2011 Fourth round	Arsenal	2–1	Huddersfield Town	London
12:00 GMT	Bendtner 22'; Gibbs (yellow card) 27'; Squillaci (red card) 42'; Fàbregas 86' (pen.) (yellow card) 90+3'	Report	66' Lee; (yellow card) 68' Arfield; (yellow card) 84' Pilkington; (yellow card) 85' McCombe; (yellow card) 90+4' Hunt	Stadium: Emirates Stadium; Attendance: 59,375; Referee: Mark Clattenburg

20 February 2011 Fifth round	Leyton Orient	1–1	Arsenal	London
16:30 GMT	Whing (yellow card) 82'; Téhoué 89'	Report	53' Rosický; (yellow card) 60' Denílson	Stadium: Brisbane Road; Attendance: 9,136; Referee: Kevin Friend

2 March 2011 Fifth round replay	Arsenal	5–0	Leyton Orient	London
19:45 GMT	Chamakh 7'; Bendtner 30', 43', 62' (pen.); Clichy 75' (yellow card) 78'	Report	(yellow card) 45' Chorley; (yellow card) 80' Cox	Stadium: Emirates Stadium; Attendance: 59,361; Referee: Lee Mason

12 March 2011 Sixth round	Manchester United	2–0	Arsenal	Manchester
17:15 GMT	Fabio 28'; Rooney 49'; Scholes (yellow card) 90+4'	Report		Stadium: Old Trafford; Attendance: 74,693; Referee: Chris Foy

Last updated: 12 March 2011
Source: Arsenal F.C.

=== League Cup ===
21 September 2010 Third round	Tottenham Hotspur	1–4 (a.e.t.)	Arsenal	London
19:45 BST	Livermore (yellow card) 21'; Pavlyuchenko (yellow card) 38'; Naughton (yellow card) 43'; Keane 49'	Report	15', (yellow card) 82' Lansbury; (yellow card) 79' Koscielny; 92' (pen.), 96' (pen.) Nasri; 105' Arshavin	Stadium: White Hart Lane; Attendance: 35,883; Referee: Lee Probert

27 October 2010 Fourth round	Newcastle United	0–4	Arsenal	Newcastle upon Tyne
19:45 BST	Smith (yellow card) 46'; Barton (yellow card) 90+2'	Report	45+2' (o.g.) Krul; 53', 88' Walcott; (yellow card) 76' Sagna; 83' Bendtner	Stadium: St James' Park; Attendance: 33,157; Referee: Andre Marriner

30 November 2010 Quarter-finals	Arsenal	2–0	Wigan Athletic	London
19:45 GMT	Vela (yellow card) 10'; Alcaraz 42' (o.g.); Bendtner 67'	Report	(yellow card) 35' Figueroa; (yellow card) 81' Thomas	Stadium: Emirates Stadium; Attendance: 59,525; Referee: Martin Atkinson

12 January 2011 Semi-finals; First leg	Ipswich Town	1–0	Arsenal	Ipswich
19:45 GMT	O'Dea (yellow card) 44'; Priskin 78' (yellow card) 82'	Report		Stadium: Portman Road; Attendance: 29,146; Referee: Martin Atkinson

25 January 2011 Semi-finals; Second leg	Arsenal	3–0 (3–1 agg.)	Ipswich Town	London
19:45 GMT	Bendtner 61'; Koscielny (yellow card) 33' (goal) 64'; Fàbregas 77'	Report	(yellow card) 25' Wickham	Stadium: Emirates Stadium; Attendance: 59,387; Referee: Mark Halsey

27 February 2011 Final	Arsenal	1–2	Birmingham City	London
16:00 GMT	Van Persie 39'; Koscielny (yellow card) 37'; Clichy (yellow card) 53'	Report	28' Žigić; (yellow card) 42' Larsson; 89' Martins; (yellow card) 90+3' Jerome; (yellow card) 90+5' Ferguson	Stadium: Wembley Stadium; Attendance: 88,855; Referee: Mike Dean

Last updated: 27 February 2011
Source: Arsenal F.C.

== See also ==
- 2010–11 in English football
- List of Arsenal F.C. seasons
