= 2011 UEFA Champions League final =

Association football match in London

- Match programme cover
- Event: 2010–11 UEFA Champions League
Barcelona	Manchester United
(Spain)	(England)
3	1
- Date: 28 May 2011
- Venue: Wembley Stadium, London
- UEFA Man of the Match: Lionel Messi (Barcelona)
- Fans' Man of the Match: Lionel Messi (Barcelona)
- Referee: Viktor Kassai (Hungary)
- Attendance: 87,695
- Weather: Cloudy; 15 °C (59 °F); 76% humidity

The 2011 UEFA Champions League final was an association football match played on 28 May 2011 at Wembley Stadium in London that decided the winner of the 2010–11 season of the UEFA Champions League. The winners received the European Champion Clubs' Cup (the European Cup). The 2011 final was the culmination of the 56th season of the tournament, and the 19th in the Champions League era.

The final was contested by Barcelona of Spain and Manchester United of England, in a repeat of the 2009 final held in Rome, which Barcelona won 2–0. The match kicked off at 19:45 BST. The referee for the match was Viktor Kassai from Hungary. The venue, the new Wembley Stadium, hosted its first European Cup final, having opened in 2007; the old Wembley Stadium hosted the finals in 1963, 1968, 1971, 1978 and 1992.

Both teams entered the competition having won it three times previously; Manchester United in 1968, 1999 and 2008, and Barcelona in 1992, 2006 and 2009. To reach the final, in the knockout phase Barcelona beat Arsenal, Shakhtar Donetsk and lastly Real Madrid in the 212th El Clásico derby, while Manchester United beat Marseille, Chelsea and Schalke 04. Both teams also entered the final as champions of their domestic leagues (the Premier League and La Liga, respectively), but neither team had won a domestic cup that season.

Barcelona dominated the match, winning 3–1 with goals from Pedro, Lionel Messi and David Villa, securing their fourth Champions League title. Wayne Rooney scored for Manchester United to level the score going into half-time.

As a result, Barcelona qualified to play against Porto, the winners of the 2010–11 UEFA Europa League, in the 2011 UEFA Super Cup in Monaco on 26 August 2011, and they also earned a place in the semi-finals of the 2011 FIFA Club World Cup in December 2011 as the UEFA representative.

== Background ==
The match was a rematch of the final two years earlier, which Barcelona had won 2–0 in Rome. United and Barcelona had both won three European titles prior to the match. United had won three years earlier against Chelsea, Bayern Munich in 1999, and Benfica in 1968. Barcelona had won their first title 19 years earlier, against Sampdoria at Wembley Stadium. They then won their second title in 2006, beating Arsenal 2–1 in Paris. The most recent title win for Barcelona was against United in 2009 and it was the most recent final for both of these teams. However, in 2008, United defeated Barcelona 1–0 on aggregate, at the semi-final stage, en route to claiming their third trophy. Barcelona were appearing in the final for the third time in six years while United were for the third time in four years.

== Venue ==
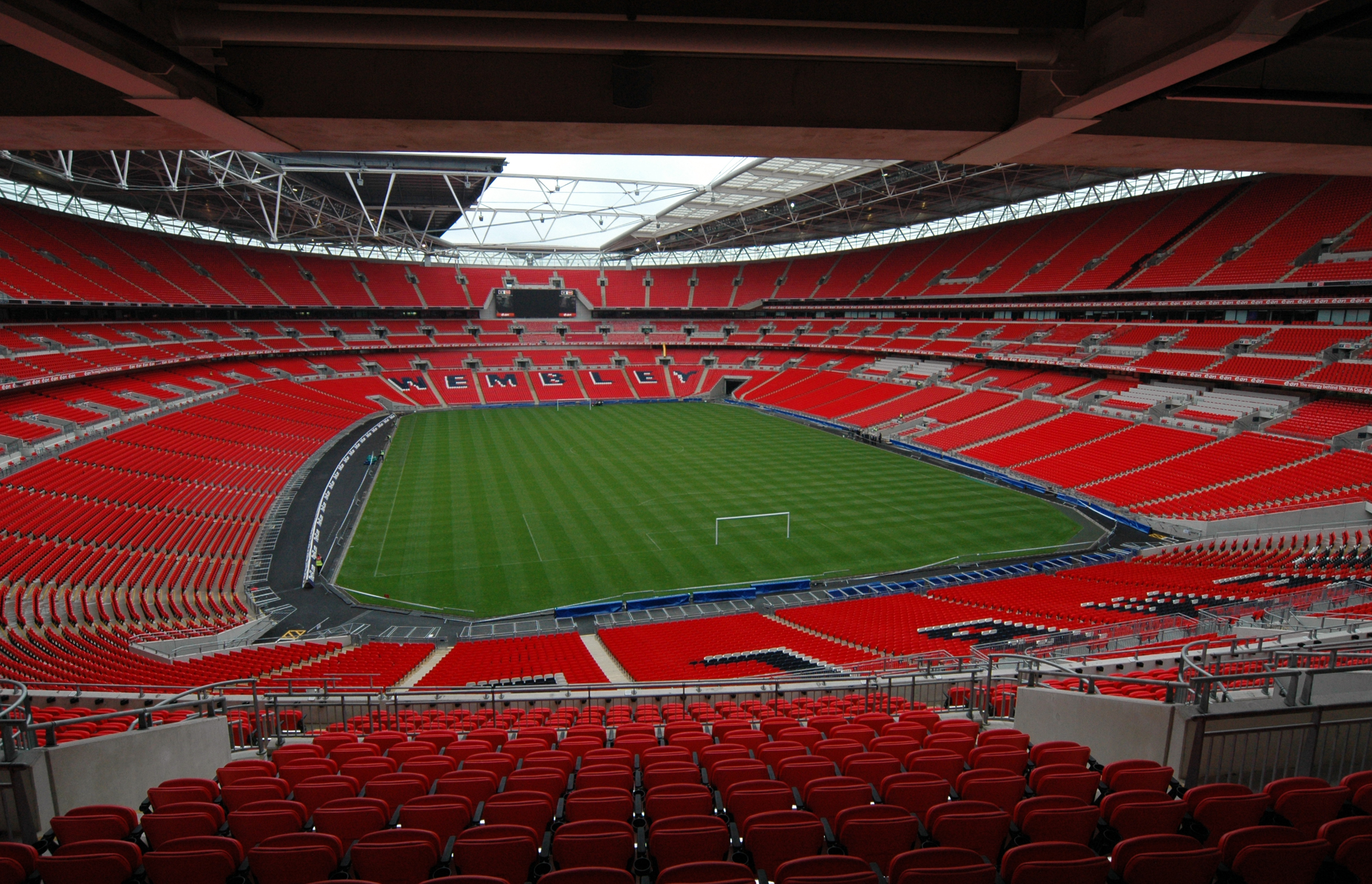
Inside Wembley Stadium

Wembley Stadium was selected as the venue for the 2011 UEFA Champions League final at a meeting of the UEFA Executive Committee in Nyon, Switzerland, on 29 January 2009. Other stadia in contention to host the final included Allianz Arena in Munich and Berlin's Olympiastadion. Allianz Arena instead hosted the 2012 final. The weekend set aside by UEFA for the 2011 Champions League final was originally scheduled by The Football League as the date for the Football League play-off finals, which are traditionally held on the British May bank holiday weekend; however, due to UEFA's requirement that they be given exclusive use of the venue in the lead-up to the final, the play-off finals had to be relocated. Due to this breach of their contract with The Football Association, The Football League demanded compensation. On 21 January 2011, as part of a settlement agreement with the FA, the League One and League Two play-off finals were moved to Old Trafford, Manchester, to be played respectively on 29 May and 28 May 2011; the Championship play-off final was not rescheduled. The Conference National play-off final was also moved to Manchester, to be played at the City of Manchester Stadium on 21 May 2011.

The original Wembley Stadium hosted five European Cup finals prior to 2011. The 1968 and 1978 finals were both won by English sides: Manchester United beat Benfica 4–1 in 1968 and Liverpool defeated Club Brugge 1–0 in 1978. Benfica also lost in the 1963 final, beaten 2–1 by A.C. Milan, while Ajax won the first of three consecutive European Cups at Wembley in 1971, beating Panathinaikos 2–0. In the 1992 final, Spanish club Barcelona defeated Italian side Sampdoria 1–0 in the final match played as the European Cup prior to the following season's introduction of the current Champions League format.

First opened for the British Empire Exhibition in 1923, the stadium was originally known as the Empire Stadium. That year, it hosted its first FA Cup Final, when almost 200,000 spectators attempted to watch the match between Bolton Wanderers and West Ham United. Wembley played host to all of England's matches at the 1966 FIFA World Cup, including the 4–2 victory over West Germany in the final, and at UEFA Euro 1996. The original stadium was closed in 2000 and demolished three years later, to be replaced by a 90,000-capacity arena, which opened in 2007.

== Route to the final ==
Note: In all results below, the score of the finalist is given first (H: home; A: away).

(Spain) Barcelona				Round	(England) Manchester United			
Opponent	Result			Group stage	Opponent	Result		
(Greece) Panathinaikos	5–1 (H)			Matchday 1	(Scotland) Rangers	0–0 (H)		
(Russia) Rubin Kazan	1–1 (A)			Matchday 2	(Spain) Valencia	1–0 (A)		
(Denmark) Copenhagen	2–0 (H)			Matchday 3	(Turkey) Bursaspor	1–0 (H)		
(Denmark) Copenhagen	1–1 (A)			Matchday 4	(Turkey) Bursaspor	3–0 (A)		
(Greece) Panathinaikos	3–0 (A)			Matchday 5	(Scotland) Rangers	1–0 (A)		
(Russia) Rubin Kazan	2–0 (H)			Matchday 6	(Spain) Valencia	1–1 (H)		
Group D winners: Pos / Team / Pld / Pts; 1 / (Spain) Barcelona / 6 / 14; 2 / (Denmark) Copenhagen / 6 / 10; 3 / (Russia) Rubin Kazan / 6 / 6; 4 / (Greece) Panathinaikos / 6 / 2; Source: Soccerway				Final standings	Group C winners: Pos / Team / Pld / Pts; 1 / (England) Manchester United / 6 / 14; 2 / (Spain) Valencia / 6 / 11; 3 / (Scotland) Rangers / 6 / 6; 4 / (Turkey) Bursaspor / 6 / 1; Source: Soccerway			
Opponent	Agg.	1st leg	2nd leg	Knockout phase	Opponent	Agg.	1st leg	2nd leg
(England) Arsenal	4–3	1–2 (A)	3–1 (H)	Round of 16	(France) Marseille	2–1	0–0 (A)	2–1 (H)
(Ukraine) Shakhtar Donetsk	6–1	5–1 (H)	1–0 (A)	Quarter-finals	(England) Chelsea	3–1	1–0 (A)	2–1 (H)
(Spain) Real Madrid	3–1	2–0 (A)	1–1 (H)	Semi-finals	(Germany) Schalke 04	6–1	2–0 (A)	4–1 (H)

== Pre-match ==
=== Ambassador ===
UEFA's ambassador for the 2011 Champions League final was the former Tottenham Hotspur forward Gary Lineker. In his first duty as ambassador, on 26 August 2010, Lineker helped to conduct the draw for the group stage of the competition. Lineker was later involved in the unveiling of the branding design for the 2011 final at an event at Wembley Stadium on 25 November 2010. Hosted by Sky Sports presenter Richard Keys, the event was also attended by UEFA competitions director Giorgio Marchetti, former British Minister for Sport and representative of the City of London Kate Hoey, General Secretary of The Football Association Alex Horne, and England Women's international Faye White.

=== Identity ===
The logo for the final is in the style of a heraldic crest and features the European Champion Clubs' Cup in the centre, flanked by two lions. According to the designers of the logo, London-based Radiant Studios, the lions are intended to represent the two teams that would contest the final, battling over the trophy. The use of traditional elements in a contemporary style in the design is said to have been inspired by modern British designers such as Vivienne Westwood and tailors on Savile Row.

=== Officials ===
In May 2011, Hungarian referee Viktor Kassai was chosen to referee the final. He was joined by fellow Hungarians Gabor Erös and György Ring as assistant referees, fourth official István Vad, additional assistant referees Tamás Bognár and Mihaly Fabian, and reserve assistant referee Róbert Kispál.

=== Ticketing ===
Although Wembley Stadium can usually hold up to 90,000 spectators, the capacity for the 2011 Champions League final was approximately 86,000. The two teams that reached the final were allocated 25,000 tickets each, while a further 11,000 tickets were put on general sale. The application period for the latter opened on 24 February 2011 and closed at 17:00 GMT on 18 March, with recipients to be determined by a random ballot before 6 April.

A ticket launch event was held at London's City Hall on 17 February 2011, at which the above ticketing process was explained. The event was also used to promote the start of ticket sales, and was attended by final ambassador Gary Lineker, his women's final counterpart Hope Powell, UEFA Champions Festival ambassador Graeme Le Saux, UEFA fourth vice-president Marios N. Lefkaritis, and vice-chairman of The Football Association Barry Bright. Le Saux and Powell were presented with the first symbolic tickets for the final by four local schoolchildren.

=== Match ball ===
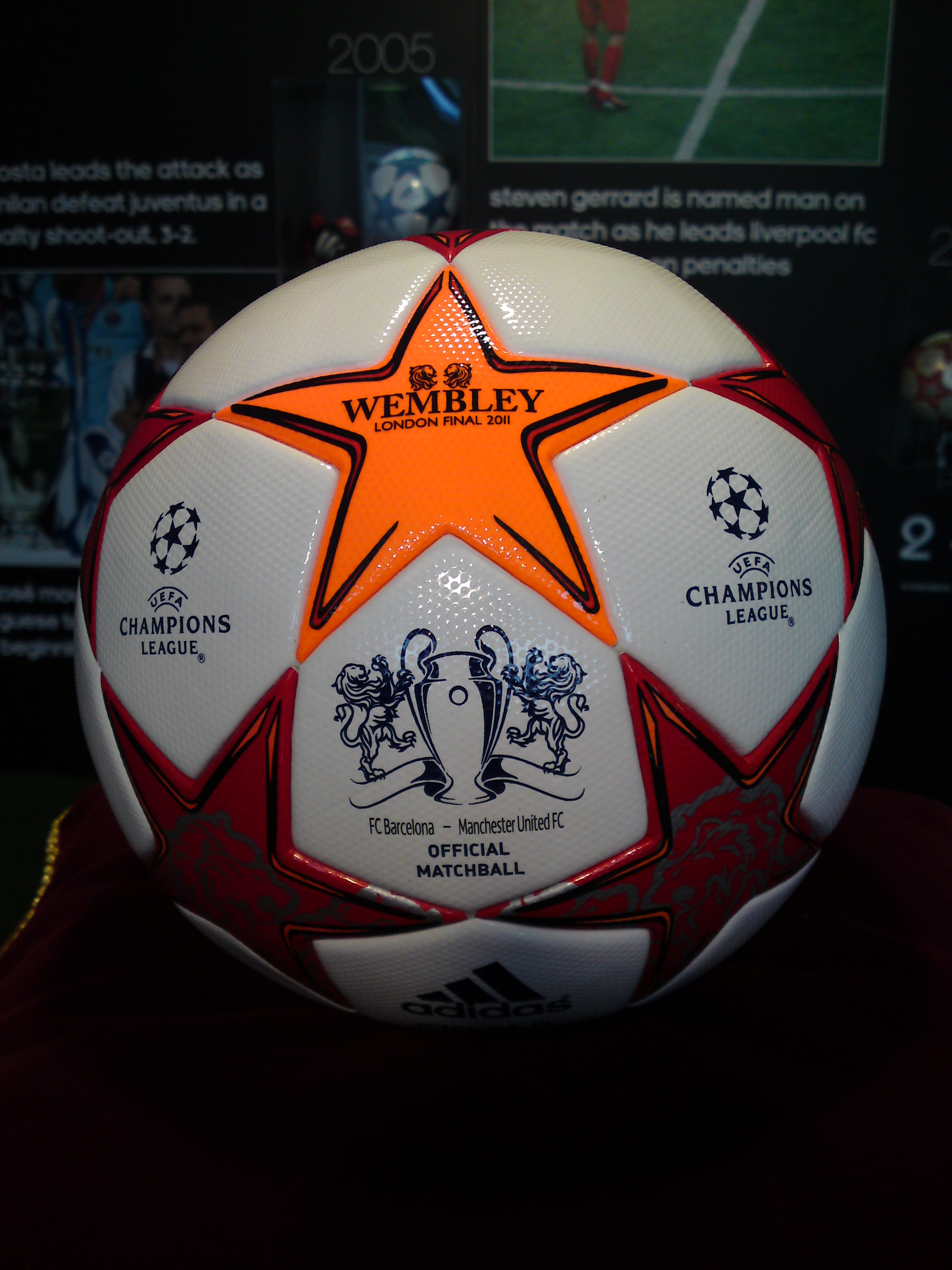
A ball from the match on display at the UEFA Champions Festival in Hyde Park, London

As with the previous ten UEFA Champions League finals, beginning with the 2001 final, the match ball was provided by German sports equipment company Adidas. Revealed on 3 March 2011 at Wembley Stadium, the Adidas Finale London features the "Starball" design synonymous with the UEFA Champions League. In reflection of the St George's Cross seen on the flag of England, the ball itself is white with red stars, connecting to a central, bright orange star. Technically, the ball shares its structure with the Adidas Finale Madrid, which was used for the 2010 final.

=== Opening ceremony ===
The 2011 Champions League final was officially opened on 21 May 2011 with the opening of the 2011 UEFA Champions Festival at Speakers' Corner in Hyde Park, London. The festival ran for the entire week leading up to the show-piece match at Wembley, closing a few hours before kick-off. Among the attractions at the festival were displays detailing the history of the European Cup, miniature football pitches for use by the public, and the trophy itself.

The UEFA Champions League Anthem was performed by British classical crossover group All Angels. The opening ceremony also featured a performance from English rapper Tinchy Stryder.

== Match ==
=== Summary ===
==== First half ====
Barcelona outplayed Manchester United, controlling 68% of possession and having 22 attempts on goal compared to United's four. United's game plan was to get bodies in front of Barcelona's attack and hope to keep the ball away from their end whenever they received possession. United would therefore often try long balls as their method of attack. Manchester United started the better of the sides, with more possession and brief sights of goal in the opening minutes. Javier Hernández had a shot towards goal blocked, and another fly over the bar (he had been offside anyway in the approach play). Barcelona came into the game after their slow start and created a few chances. David Villa had a shot from range go just wide in the 19th minute, and another in the 21st minute was saved well by Van der Sar. Barcelona then took the lead in the 27th minute when Xavi played in Pedro, who struck from inside the penalty area. It looked as if Barcelona could keep possession to win the game with just that goal. However, United equalised seven minutes later against the run of play. After some pressuring by United on Barcelona who were taking a throw-in deep in their own half, Wayne Rooney received the ball, played a one-two with Ryan Giggs, and curled the ball into the corner from 15 yards. Replays showed that Giggs may have been just offside in the approach play. On the stroke of half-time, Messi almost latched onto a cross from Villa but could not turn it into the net from a few yards out. The whistle blew soon afterwards for half-time.

==== Second half ====
Barcelona's dominance continued in the second half. Messi almost gave Barcelona the lead in the 52nd minute when he latched onto a rebound from a Van der Sar save from Dani Alves, but Patrice Evra cleared off the line with his head. Barcelona regained the lead in the 54th minute when Messi received the ball and fired home from 20 yards out. Barcelona dominated for the next 15 minutes or so. Messi turned Rio Ferdinand and got a shot away from about eight yards out, forcing a save from Van der Sar. In the 66th minute, Xavi had a long shot saved by Van der Sar, and Iniesta had another long shot saved by the United keeper a few minutes later. A third goal came in the 69th minute. David Villa got the ball about 20 yards out and curled a shot into the top corner to seal the result. United tried to hit back immediately with an attack, with Rooney having a curling shot go just over the bar. Nani then made a run across Barcelona's 18-yard box in the 85th minute and got a shot away which went just wide. But there was no way back for United and Barcelona held on comfortably to win their fourth European title and the third in six years.

=== Details ===
28 May 2011
19:45 UTC+1

Barcelona (Spain)	3–1	(England) Manchester United
Pedro 27'; Messi 54'; Villa 69'	Report	Rooney 34'

Wembley Stadium, London
Attendance: 87,695
Referee: Viktor Kassai (Hungary)

Barcelona	Manchester United

GK	1	(Spain) Víctor Valdés	(yellow card) 85'
RB	2	(Brazil) Dani Alves	(yellow card) 60'	(substituted off) 88'
CB	14	(Argentina) Javier Mascherano
CB	3	(Spain) Gerard Piqué
LB	22	(France) Eric Abidal
DM	16	(Spain) Sergio Busquets
CM	6	(Spain) Xavi (c)
CM	8	(Spain) Andrés Iniesta
RF	7	(Spain) David Villa		(substituted off) 86'
CF	10	(Argentina) Lionel Messi
LF	17	(Spain) Pedro		(substituted off) 90+2'
Substitutes:
GK	38	(Spain) Oier
DF	5	(Spain) Carles Puyol		(substituted on) 88'
DF	21	(Brazil) Adriano
MF	15	(Mali) Seydou Keita		(substituted on) 86'
MF	20	(Netherlands) Ibrahim Afellay		(substituted on) 90+2'
MF	30	(Spain) Thiago
FW	9	(Spain) Bojan
Manager:
(Spain) Pep Guardiola

GK	1	(Netherlands) Edwin van der Sar
RB	20	(Brazil) Fábio		(substituted off) 69'
CB	5	(England) Rio Ferdinand
CB	15	(Serbia) Nemanja Vidić (c)
LB	3	(France) Patrice Evra
RM	25	(Ecuador) Antonio Valencia	(yellow card) 79'
CM	16	(England) Michael Carrick	(yellow card) 61'	(substituted off) 77'
CM	11	(Wales) Ryan Giggs
LM	13	(South Korea) Park Ji-sung
SS	10	(England) Wayne Rooney
CF	14	(Mexico) Javier Hernández
Substitutes:
GK	29	(Poland) Tomasz Kuszczak
DF	12	(England) Chris Smalling
MF	8	(Brazil) Anderson
MF	17	(Portugal) Nani		(substituted on) 69'
MF	18	(England) Paul Scholes		(substituted on) 77'
MF	24	(Scotland) Darren Fletcher
FW	7	(England) Michael Owen
Manager:
(Scotland) Alex Ferguson

UEFA Man of the Match:
Lionel Messi (Barcelona)
Fans' Man of the Match:
Lionel Messi (Barcelona)

Assistant referees:
Gábor Erős (Hungary)
György Ring (Hungary)
Fourth official:
István Vad (Hungary)
Additional assistant referees:
Mihály Fábián (Hungary)
Tamás Bognár (Hungary)
Reserve assistant referee:
Robert Kispál (Hungary)

=== Statistics ===
First half
Statistic	Barcelona	Manchester United
Goals scored	1	1
Total shots	8	2
Shots on target	3	1
Saves	0	2
Ball possession	67%	33%
Corner kicks	1	0
Fouls committed	2	5
Offsides	0	4
Yellow cards	0	0
Red cards	0	0

Second half
Statistic	Barcelona	Manchester United
Goals scored	2	0
Total shots	11	2
Shots on target	9	0
Saves	0	6
Ball possession	62%	38%
Corner kicks	5	0
Fouls committed	3	11
Offsides	1	1
Yellow cards	2	2
Red cards	0	0

Overall
Statistic	Barcelona	Manchester United
Goals scored	3	1
Total shots	19	4
Shots on target	12	1
Saves	0	8
Ball possession	63%	37%
Corner kicks	6	0
Fouls committed	5	16
Offsides	1	5
Yellow cards	2	2
Red cards	0	0

== Post-match ==
=== Trophy presentation and celebrations ===
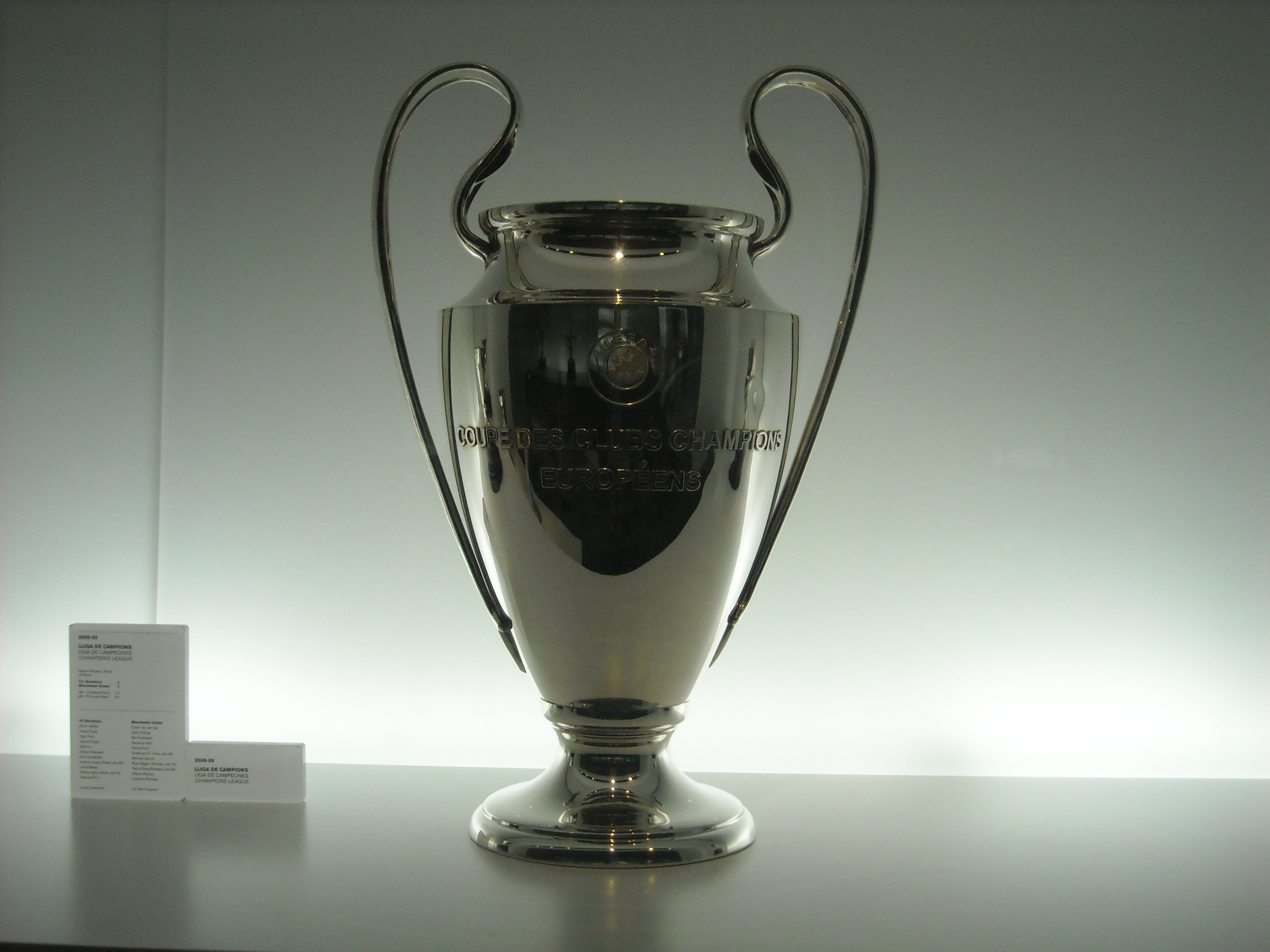
The UEFA Champions League trophy in FC Barcelona Museum.

In a gesture by his teammates, Eric Abidal, who had undergone surgery only two months earlier to remove a tumour in his liver, was given the honour of wearing the captain's armband during the trophy presentation ceremony. He was the first player to lift the trophy. Speaking afterwards, Abidal, who was in tears, appreciated the gesture, and spoke of how "special" his club was.

Barcelona coach Pep Guardiola singled out Messi after the game, stating the Argentine was "the best player [he'd] ever seen" and that Messi "made the difference" in the game. Meanwhile, Manchester United manager Sir Alex Ferguson acknowledged that the Barcelona side was the best team he had ever faced. His sentiments were echoed by United captain Nemanja Vidić and defender Rio Ferdinand.

Gerard Piqué cut the mesh from the net in front of the Barcelona fans where Barcelona had scored the two winning goals, and took it back to the club museum at the Camp Nou. The Barcelona players, coaches, and their families then formed a circle at centre field and danced. The sprinklers at Wembley came on at this time and the players and coaches celebrated under them.

The match was the last for Manchester United goalkeeper Edwin van der Sar, who had announced his retirement from football to follow the 2011 season.

== Broadcasting ==
The match was shown on ITV and Sky Sports in the United Kingdom. Sky Sports partnered with UK-based outside broadcast facilities providers NEP Visions and Telegenic to produce host coverage of the match. In the United States, Fox aired the final for the second consecutive year. In South America, Rede Globo and Rede Bandeirantes broadcast the match for Brazil. Sky Deutschland (Pay TV) and Sat. 1 were broadcasting the match for Germany, public broadcaster SF 2 showed the final in Switzerland, as well as, the public broadcaster ORF 1 in Austria.

The match was broadcast live in 3D in the Trädgår'n club hall in Gothenburg, Sweden on the Guinness Book of World Records' largest television.

== See also ==
- 1991 European Cup Winners' Cup final – contested by same teams
- 2009 UEFA Champions League final – contested by same teams
- 2010–11 FC Barcelona season
- 2010–11 Manchester United F.C. season
- 2011 UEFA Europa League final
- 2011 UEFA Women's Champions League final
- FC Barcelona in international football
- Manchester United F.C. in international football
