= 2010–11 UEFA Champions League group stage =

International football competition

The group stage of the 2010–11 UEFA Champions League featured 32 teams: the 22 automatic qualifiers and the 10 winners of the play-off round (five through the Champions Path, five through the Non-Champions Path).

The teams were drawn into eight groups of four, and played each other home-and-away in a round-robin format. The matchdays were 14–15 September, 28–29 September, 19–20 October, 2–3 November, 23–24 November, and 7–8 December 2010.

The top two teams in each group advanced to the first knockout round, while the third-placed teams dropped down to the Europa League round of 32.

Partizan and Žilina became only the eleventh and twelfth teams in UEFA Champions League history to lose all six group stage matches.

== Teams ==
The draw for the group stage was held in Monaco on 26 August 2010 at 18:00 CEST (UTC+2).

Teams were seeded into four pots based on their 2010 UEFA club coefficients. The title holders, Internazionale, were automatically seeded into Pot 1. Teams from the same national association could not be drawn against each other. Pot 1 held teams ranked 1–10, Pot 2 held teams ranked 11–29, Pot 3 held teams ranked 30–63, while Pot 4 held teams ranked 73–180 and unranked teams.

Group winners and runners-up advanced to the first knockout round
Third-placed teams entered the UEFA Europa League at the round of 32

Pot 1
Team	Notes	Coeff.
(Italy) Internazionale		100.867
(Spain) Barcelona		136.951
(England) Manchester United		125.371
(England) Chelsea		118.371
(England) Arsenal		115.371
(Germany) Bayern Munich		110.841
(Italy) Milan		99.867
(France) Lyon		96.748

Pot 2
Team	Notes	Coeff.
(Germany) Werder Bremen		94.841
(Spain) Real Madrid		84.951
(Italy) Roma		83.867
(Ukraine) Shakhtar Donetsk		73.910
(Portugal) Benfica		72.659
(Spain) Valencia		66.951
(France) Marseille		62.748
(Greece) Panathinaikos		56.979

Pot 3
Team	Notes	Coeff.
(England) Tottenham Hotspur		56.371
(Scotland) Rangers		56.158
(Netherlands) Ajax		55.309
(Germany) Schalke 04		54.841
(Switzerland) Basel		48.675
(Portugal) Braga		39.659
(Denmark) Copenhagen		34.470
(Russia) Spartak Moscow		33.758

Pot 4
Team	Notes	Coeff.
(Israel) Hapoel Tel Aviv		27.775
(Netherlands) Twente		25.309
(Russia) Rubin Kazan		21.758
(France) Auxerre		19.748
(Romania) CFR Cluj		15.898
(Serbia) Partizan		13.800
(Slovakia) Žilina		10.666
(Turkey) Bursaspor		6.890

Notes

1. ^{TH} Champions League title holders (automatic top seed of pot 1)
2. ^{CP} Qualified through play-off round (Champions Path)
3. ^{NCP} Qualified through play-off round (Non-Champions Path)

On each matchday, four groups played their matches on Tuesday, while the other four groups played their matches on Wednesday, with the two sets of groups (A–D, E–H) alternating between each matchday. Based on this principle, the draw was controlled for clubs from the same association in order to split the teams evenly into the two sets of groups.

The fixtures were decided after the draw. There were certain restrictions, e.g., teams from the same city (e.g. Milan and Internazionale, which also shared a stadium) did not play at home on the same matchday (UEFA tried to avoid teams from the same city playing at home on the same day or on consecutive days), and Russian teams did not play at home on the last matchday due to cold weather.

== Tie-breaking criteria ==
If two or more teams were equal on points on completion of the group matches, the following criteria would be applied to determine the rankings:

1. higher number of points obtained in the group matches played among the teams in question;
2. superior goal difference from the group matches played among the teams in question;
3. higher number of goals scored away from home in the group matches played among the teams in question;
4. superior goal difference from all group matches played;
5. higher number of goals scored;
6. higher number of coefficient points accumulated by the club in question, as well as its association, over the previous five seasons.

== Groups ==
Times are CET/CEST, (Note: CET (UTC+1) for matches from 2 November 2010, and CEST (UTC+2) for matches to 20 October 2010.) as listed by UEFA (local times, if different, are in parentheses).

=== Group A ===
Pos	Team	Pld	W	D	L	GF	GA	GD	Pts	Qualification	TOT	INT	TWE	BRM
1	(England) Tottenham Hotspur	6	3	2	1	18	11	+7	11	Advance to knockout phase	—	3–1	4–1	3–0
2	(Italy) Internazionale	6	3	1	2	12	11	+1	10	Advance to knockout phase	4–3	—	1–0	4–0
3	(Netherlands) Twente	6	1	3	2	9	11	−2	6	Transfer to Europa League	3–3	2–2	—	1–1
4	(Germany) Werder Bremen	6	1	2	3	6	12	−6	5		2–2	3–0	0–2	—

Source: Soccerway
14 September 2010
20:45

Twente (Netherlands)	2–2	(Italy) Internazionale
Janssen 20'; Milito 30' (o.g.)	Report	Sneijder 13'; Eto'o 41'

De Grolsch Veste, Enschede
Attendance: 23,800
Referee: Pedro Proença (Portugal)
14 September 2010
20:45

Werder Bremen (Germany)	2–2	(England) Tottenham Hotspur
Almeida 43'; Marin 47'	Report	Pasanen 12' (o.g.); Crouch 18'

Weserstadion, Bremen
Attendance: 30,344
Referee: Massimo Busacca (Switzerland)

29 September 2010
20:45 (19:45 UTC+1)

Tottenham Hotspur (England)	4–1	(Netherlands) Twente
Van der Vaart 47'; Pavlyuchenko 50' (pen.), 64' (pen.); Bale 85'	Report	Chadli 56'

White Hart Lane, London
Attendance: 32,518
Referee: Terje Hauge (Norway)
29 September 2010
20:45

Internazionale (Italy)	4–0	(Germany) Werder Bremen
Eto'o 21', 27', 81'; Sneijder 34'	Report

San Siro, Milan
Attendance: 48,126
Referee: Alberto Undiano Mallenco (Spain)

20 October 2010
20:45

Internazionale (Italy)	4–3	(England) Tottenham Hotspur
Zanetti 2'; Eto'o 11' (pen.), 35'; Stanković 14'	Report	Bale 52', 90', 90+1'

San Siro, Milan
Attendance: 49,551
Referee: Damir Skomina (Slovenia)
20 October 2010
20:45

Twente (Netherlands)	1–1	(Germany) Werder Bremen
Janssen 75'	Report	Arnautović 80'

De Grolsch Veste, Enschede
Attendance: 24,000
Referee: Claus Bo Larsen (Denmark)

2 November 2010
20:45 (19:45 UTC+0)

Tottenham Hotspur (England)	3–1	(Italy) Internazionale
Van der Vaart 18'; Crouch 61'; Pavlyuchenko 89'	Report	Eto'o 80'

White Hart Lane, London
Attendance: 34,103
Referee: Viktor Kassai (Hungary)
2 November 2010
20:45

Werder Bremen (Germany)	0–2	(Netherlands) Twente
	Report	Chadli 81'; De Jong 84'

Weserstadion, Bremen
Attendance: 29,641
Referee: Alain Hamer (Luxembourg)

24 November 2010
20:45

Internazionale (Italy)	1–0	(Netherlands) Twente
Cambiasso 55'	Report

San Siro, Milan
Attendance: 29,466
Referee: Stéphane Lannoy (France)
24 November 2010
20:45 (19:45 UTC+0)

Tottenham Hotspur (England)	3–0	(Germany) Werder Bremen
Kaboul 6'; Modrić 45+1'; Crouch 79'	Report

White Hart Lane, London
Attendance: 33,546
Referee: Olegário Benquerença (Portugal)

7 December 2010
20:45

Twente (Netherlands)	3–3	(England) Tottenham Hotspur
Landzaat 22' (pen.); Rosales 56'; Chadli 64'	Report	Wisgerhof 12' (o.g.); Defoe 47', 59'

De Grolsch Veste, Enschede
Attendance: 24,000
Referee: Carlos Velasco Carballo (Spain)
7 December 2010
20:45

Werder Bremen (Germany)	3–0	(Italy) Internazionale
Prödl 39'; Arnautović 49'; Pizarro 88'	Report

Weserstadion, Bremen
Attendance: 30,400
Referee: Cüneyt Çakır (Turkey)

=== Group B ===
Pos	Team	Pld	W	D	L	GF	GA	GD	Pts	Qualification	SCH	LYO	BEN	HTA
1	(Germany) Schalke 04	6	4	1	1	10	3	+7	13	Advance to knockout phase	—	3–0	2–0	3–1
2	(France) Lyon	6	3	1	2	11	10	+1	10	Advance to knockout phase	1–0	—	2–0	2–2
3	(Portugal) Benfica	6	2	0	4	7	12	−5	6	Transfer to Europa League	1–2	4–3	—	2–0
4	(Israel) Hapoel Tel Aviv	6	1	2	3	7	10	−3	5		0–0	1–3	3–0	—

Source: Soccerway
14 September 2010
20:45

Lyon (France)	1–0	(Germany) Schalke 04
Bastos 21'	Report

Stade de Gerland, Lyon
Attendance: 35,552
Referee: Ivan Bebek (Croatia)
14 September 2010
20:45 (19:45 UTC+1)

Benfica (Portugal)	2–0	(Israel) Hapoel Tel Aviv
Luisão 21'; Cardozo 68'	Report

Estádio da Luz, Lisbon
Attendance: 31,512
Referee: Aleksei Nikolaev (Russia)

29 September 2010
20:45 (21:45 UTC+3)

Hapoel Tel Aviv (Israel)	1–3	(France) Lyon
Enyeama 79' (pen.)	Report	Bastos 7' (pen.), 36'; Pjanić 90+4'

Bloomfield Stadium, Tel Aviv
Attendance: 12,226
Referee: Howard Webb (England)
29 September 2010
20:45

Schalke 04 (Germany)	2–0	(Portugal) Benfica
Farfán 73'; Huntelaar 85'	Report

Veltins-Arena, Gelsenkirchen
Attendance: 50,436
Referee: Gianluca Rocchi (Italy)

20 October 2010
20:45

Schalke 04 (Germany)	3–1	(Israel) Hapoel Tel Aviv
Raúl 3', 58'; Jurado 68'	Report	Shechter 90+3'

Veltins-Arena, Gelsenkirchen
Attendance: 50,900
Referee: William Collum (Scotland)
20 October 2010
20:45

Lyon (France)	2–0	(Portugal) Benfica
Briand 21'; Lisandro 51'	Report

Stade de Gerland, Lyon
Attendance: 36,816
Referee: Alberto Undiano Mallenco (Spain)

2 November 2010
20:45 (21:45 UTC+2)

Hapoel Tel Aviv (Israel)	0–0	(Germany) Schalke 04
	Report

Bloomfield Stadium, Tel Aviv
Attendance: 12,132
Referee: Frank De Bleeckere (Belgium)
2 November 2010
20:45 (19:45 UTC+0)

Benfica (Portugal)	4–3	(France) Lyon
Kardec 20'; Coentrão 32', 67'; García 42'	Report	Gourcuff 74'; Gomis 85'; Lovren 90+5'

Estádio da Luz, Lisbon
Attendance: 37,394
Referee: Craig Thomson (Scotland)

24 November 2010
20:45

Schalke 04 (Germany)	3–0	(France) Lyon
Farfán 13'; Huntelaar 20', 89'	Report

Veltins-Arena, Gelsenkirchen
Attendance: 51,132
Referee: Nicola Rizzoli (Italy)
24 November 2010
20:45 (21:45 UTC+2)

Hapoel Tel Aviv (Israel)	3–0	(Portugal) Benfica
Zahavi 24', 90+2'; Douglas da Silva 74'	Report

Bloomfield Stadium, Tel Aviv
Attendance: 11,668
Referee: Alain Hamer (Luxembourg)

7 December 2010
20:45

Lyon (France)	2–2	(Israel) Hapoel Tel Aviv
Lisandro 62'; Lacazette 88'	Report	Sahar 63'; Zahavi 69'

Stade de Gerland, Lyon
Attendance: 32,245
Referee: Svein Oddvar Moen (Norway)
7 December 2010
20:45 (19:45 UTC+0)

Benfica (Portugal)	1–2	(Germany) Schalke 04
Luisão 87'	Report	Jurado 19'; Höwedes 81'

Estádio da Luz, Lisbon
Attendance: 23,348
Referee: Howard Webb (England)

=== Group C ===
Pos	Team	Pld	W	D	L	GF	GA	GD	Pts	Qualification	MUN	VAL	RAN	BUR
1	(England) Manchester United	6	4	2	0	7	1	+6	14	Advance to knockout phase	—	1–1	0–0	1–0
2	(Spain) Valencia	6	3	2	1	15	4	+11	11	Advance to knockout phase	0–1	—	3–0	6–1
3	(Scotland) Rangers	6	1	3	2	3	6	−3	6	Transfer to Europa League	0–1	1–1	—	1–0
4	(Turkey) Bursaspor	6	0	1	5	2	16	−14	1		0–3	0–4	1–1	—

Source: Soccerway
14 September 2010
20:45 (19:45 UTC+1)

Manchester United (England)	0–0	(Scotland) Rangers
	Report

Old Trafford, Manchester
Attendance: 74,408
Referee: Olegário Benquerença (Portugal)
14 September 2010
20:45 (21:45 UTC+3)

Bursaspor (Turkey)	0–4	(Spain) Valencia
	Report	T. Costa 16'; Aduriz 41'; Hernández 68'; Soldado 76'

Bursa Atatürk Stadium, Bursa
Attendance: 22,055
Referee: Svein Oddvar Moen (Norway)

29 September 2010
20:45

Valencia (Spain)	0–1	(England) Manchester United
	Report	Hernández 85'

Mestalla, Valencia
Attendance: 34,946
Referee: Viktor Kassai (Hungary)
29 September 2010
20:45 (19:45 UTC+1)

Rangers (Scotland)	1–0	(Turkey) Bursaspor
Naismith 18'	Report

Ibrox Stadium, Glasgow
Attendance: 41,905
Referee: Serge Gumienny (Belgium)

20 October 2010
20:45 (19:45 UTC+1)

Rangers (Scotland)	1–1	(Spain) Valencia
Edu 34'	Report	Edu 46' (o.g.)

Ibrox Stadium, Glasgow
Attendance: 45,153
Referee: Nicola Rizzoli (Italy)
20 October 2010
20:45 (19:45 UTC+1)

Manchester United (England)	1–0	(Turkey) Bursaspor
Nani 7'	Report

Old Trafford, Manchester
Attendance: 72,610
Referee: Gianluca Rocchi (Italy)

2 November 2010
20:45

Valencia (Spain)	3–0	(Scotland) Rangers
Soldado 33', 71'; T. Costa 90'	Report

Mestalla, Valencia
Attendance: 26,821
Referee: Felix Brych (Germany)
2 November 2010
20:45 (21:45 UTC+2)

Bursaspor (Turkey)	0–3	(England) Manchester United
	Report	Fletcher 48'; Obertan 73'; Bebé 77'

Bursa Atatürk Stadium, Bursa
Attendance: 19,050
Referee: Wolfgang Stark (Germany)

24 November 2010
20:45 (19:45 UTC+0)

Rangers (Scotland)	0–1	(England) Manchester United
	Report	Rooney 87' (pen.)

Ibrox Stadium, Glasgow
Attendance: 49,764
Referee: Massimo Busacca (Switzerland)
24 November 2010
20:45

Valencia (Spain)	6–1	(Turkey) Bursaspor
Mata 17' (pen.); Soldado 21', 55'; Aduriz 30'; Joaquín 37'; Domínguez 78'	Report	Batalla 69'

Mestalla, Valencia
Attendance: 31,225
Referee: Bruno Paixão (Portugal)

7 December 2010
20:45 (19:45 UTC+0)

Manchester United (England)	1–1	(Spain) Valencia
Anderson 62'	Report	Hernández 32'

Old Trafford, Manchester
Attendance: 74,513
Referee: Pedro Proença (Portugal)
7 December 2010
20:45 (21:45 UTC+2)

Bursaspor (Turkey)	1–1	(Scotland) Rangers
Sercan 79'	Report	Miller 19'

Bursa Atatürk Stadium, Bursa
Attendance: 9,673
Referee: Tony Chapron (France)

=== Group D ===
Pos	Team	Pld	W	D	L	GF	GA	GD	Pts	Qualification	BAR	CPH	RUB	PAN
1	(Spain) Barcelona	6	4	2	0	14	3	+11	14	Advance to knockout phase	—	2–0	2–0	5–1
2	(Denmark) Copenhagen	6	3	1	2	7	5	+2	10	Advance to knockout phase	1–1	—	1–0	3–1
3	(Russia) Rubin Kazan	6	1	3	2	2	4	−2	6	Transfer to Europa League	1–1	1–0	—	0–0
4	(Greece) Panathinaikos	6	0	2	4	2	13	−11	2		0–3	0–2	0–0	—

Source: Soccerway
14 September 2010
20:45

Barcelona (Spain)	5–1	(Greece) Panathinaikos
Messi 22', 45'; Villa 33'; Pedro 78'; Dani Alves 90+3'	Report	Govou 20'

Camp Nou, Barcelona
Attendance: 69,738
Referee: Nicola Rizzoli (Italy)
14 September 2010
20:45

Copenhagen (Denmark)	1–0	(Russia) Rubin Kazan
N'Doye 87'	Report

Parken Stadium, Copenhagen
Attendance: 29,561
Referee: Thomas Einwaller (Austria)

29 September 2010
18:30 (20:30 UTC+4)

Rubin Kazan (Russia)	1–1	(Spain) Barcelona
Noboa 30' (pen.)	Report	Villa 60' (pen.)

Central Stadium, Kazan
Attendance: 23,950
Referee: Cüneyt Çakır (Turkey)
29 September 2010
20:45 (21:45 UTC+3)

Panathinaikos (Greece)	0–2	(Denmark) Copenhagen
	Report	N'Doye 28'; Vingaard 37'

Olympic Stadium, Athens
Attendance: 43,607
Referee: William Collum (Scotland)

20 October 2010
20:45 (21:45 UTC+3)

Panathinaikos (Greece)	0–0	(Russia) Rubin Kazan
	Report

Olympic Stadium, Athens
Attendance: 36,748
Referee: Manuel Gräfe (Germany)
20 October 2010
20:45

Barcelona (Spain)	2–0	(Denmark) Copenhagen
Messi 19', 90+2'	Report

Camp Nou, Barcelona
Attendance: 75,852
Referee: Stéphane Lannoy (France)

2 November 2010
18:30 (20:30 UTC+3)

Rubin Kazan (Russia)	0–0	(Greece) Panathinaikos
	Report

Central Stadium, Kazan
Attendance: 16,400
Referee: Tony Chapron (France)
2 November 2010
20:45

Copenhagen (Denmark)	1–1	(Spain) Barcelona
Claudemir 32'	Report	Messi 31'

Parken Stadium, Copenhagen
Attendance: 37,049
Referee: Cristian Balaj (Romania)

24 November 2010
18:30 (20:30 UTC+3)

Rubin Kazan (Russia)	1–0	(Denmark) Copenhagen
Noboa 45+2' (pen.)	Report

Central Stadium, Kazan
Attendance: 18,720
Referee: Martin Atkinson (England)
24 November 2010
20:45 (21:45 UTC+2)

Panathinaikos (Greece)	0–3	(Spain) Barcelona
	Report	Pedro 27', 69'; Messi 62'

Olympic Stadium, Athens
Attendance: 58,466
Referee: Gianluca Rocchi (Italy)

7 December 2010
20:45

Barcelona (Spain)	2–0	(Russia) Rubin Kazan
Fontàs 51'; Vázquez 83'	Report

Camp Nou, Barcelona
Attendance: 50,436
Referee: Jonas Eriksson (Sweden)
7 December 2010
20:45

Copenhagen (Denmark)	3–1	(Greece) Panathinaikos
Vingaard 26'; Grønkjær 50' (pen.); Cissé 73' (o.g.)	Report	Kanté 90+2'

Parken Stadium, Copenhagen
Attendance: 36,797
Referee: Florian Meyer (Germany)

=== Group E ===
Pos	Team	Pld	W	D	L	GF	GA	GD	Pts	Qualification	BAY	ROM	BSL	CLJ
1	(Germany) Bayern Munich	6	5	0	1	16	6	+10	15	Advance to knockout phase	—	2–0	3–0	3–2
2	(Italy) Roma	6	3	1	2	10	11	−1	10	Advance to knockout phase	3–2	—	1–3	2–1
3	(Switzerland) Basel	6	2	0	4	8	11	−3	6	Transfer to Europa League	1–2	2–3	—	1–0
4	(Romania) CFR Cluj	6	1	1	4	6	12	−6	4		0–4	1–1	2–1	—

Source: Soccerway
15 September 2010
20:45

Bayern Munich (Germany)	2–0	(Italy) Roma
Müller 79'; Klose 83'	Report

Allianz Arena, Munich
Attendance: 66,000
Referee: Stéphane Lannoy (France)
15 September 2010
20:45 (21:45 UTC+3)

CFR Cluj (Romania)	2–1	(Switzerland) Basel
Rada 9'; Traoré 12'	Report	Stocker 45+2'

Stadionul Dr. Constantin Rădulescu, Cluj-Napoca
Attendance: 9,593
Referee: Alan Kelly (Republic of Ireland)

28 September 2010
20:45

Basel (Switzerland)	1–2	(Germany) Bayern Munich
Frei 18'	Report	Schweinsteiger 56' (pen.), 89'

St. Jakob-Park, Basel
Attendance: 37,500
Referee: Craig Thomson (Scotland)
28 September 2010
20:45

Roma (Italy)	2–1	(Romania) CFR Cluj
Mexès 69'; Borriello 71'	Report	Rada 78'

Stadio Olimpico, Rome
Attendance: 30,252
Referee: Jonas Eriksson (Sweden)

19 October 2010
20:45

Roma (Italy)	1–3	(Switzerland) Basel
Borriello 21'	Report	Frei 12'; Inkoom 44'; Cabral 90+3'

Stadio Olimpico, Rome
Attendance: 22,365
Referee: Aleksei Nikolaev (Russia)
19 October 2010
20:45

Bayern Munich (Germany)	3–2	(Romania) CFR Cluj
Cadú 32' (o.g.); Panin 37' (o.g.); Gómez 77'	Report	Cadú 28'; Culio 86'

Allianz Arena, Munich
Attendance: 64,000
Referee: Martin Atkinson (England)

3 November 2010
20:45

Basel (Switzerland)	2–3	(Italy) Roma
Frei 69'; Shaqiri 83'	Report	Ménez 16'; Totti 26' (pen.); Greco 76'

St. Jakob-Park, Basel
Attendance: 36,375
Referee: Björn Kuipers (Netherlands)
3 November 2010
20:45 (21:45 UTC+2)

CFR Cluj (Romania)	0–4	(Germany) Bayern Munich
	Report	Gómez 12', 24', 71'; Müller 90'

Stadionul Dr. Constantin Rădulescu, Cluj-Napoca
Attendance: 14,097
Referee: Serge Gumienny (Belgium)

23 November 2010
20:45

Roma (Italy)	3–2	(Germany) Bayern Munich
Borriello 49'; De Rossi 81'; Totti 84' (pen.)	Report	Gómez 33', 39'

Stadio Olimpico, Rome
Attendance: 42,789
Referee: Alberto Undiano Mallenco (Spain)
23 November 2010
20:45

Basel (Switzerland)	1–0	(Romania) CFR Cluj
Almerares 15'	Report

St. Jakob-Park, Basel
Attendance: 34,239
Referee: Laurent Duhamel (France)

8 December 2010
20:45

Bayern Munich (Germany)	3–0	(Switzerland) Basel
Ribéry 35', 50'; Tymoshchuk 37'	Report

Allianz Arena, Munich
Attendance: 64,000
Referee: Martin Hansson (Sweden)
8 December 2010
20:45 (21:45 UTC+2)

CFR Cluj (Romania)	1–1	(Italy) Roma
Traoré 88'	Report	Borriello 21'

Stadionul Dr. Constantin Rădulescu, Cluj-Napoca
Attendance: 12,800
Referee: William Collum (Scotland)

=== Group F ===
Pos	Team	Pld	W	D	L	GF	GA	GD	Pts	Qualification	CHE	MAR	SPM	ZIL
1	(England) Chelsea	6	5	0	1	14	4	+10	15	Advance to knockout phase	—	2–0	4–1	2–1
2	(France) Marseille	6	4	0	2	12	3	+9	12	Advance to knockout phase	1–0	—	0–1	1–0
3	(Russia) Spartak Moscow	6	3	0	3	7	10	−3	9	Transfer to Europa League	0–2	0–3	—	3–0
4	(Slovakia) Žilina	6	0	0	6	3	19	−16	0		1–4	0–7	1–2	—

Source: Soccerway
15 September 2010
20:45

Marseille (France)	0–1	(Russia) Spartak Moscow
	Report	Azpilicueta 81' (o.g.)

Stade Vélodrome, Marseille
Attendance: 45,729
Referee: Florian Meyer (Germany)
15 September 2010
20:45

Žilina (Slovakia)	1–4	(England) Chelsea
Oravec 55'	Report	Essien 13'; Anelka 24', 28'; Sturridge 48'

Štadión pod Dubňom, Žilina
Attendance: 10,829
Referee: Björn Kuipers (Netherlands)

28 September 2010
18:30 (20:30 UTC+4)

Spartak Moscow (Russia)	3–0	(Slovakia) Žilina
Ari 34', 61'; Ibson 89'	Report

Luzhniki Stadium, Moscow
Attendance: 37,000
Referee: Martin Hansson (Sweden)
28 September 2010
20:45 (19:45 UTC+1)

Chelsea (England)	2–0	(France) Marseille
Terry 7'; Anelka 28' (pen.)	Report

Stamford Bridge, London
Attendance: 40,675
Referee: Frank De Bleeckere (Belgium)

19 October 2010
18:30 (20:30 UTC+4)

Spartak Moscow (Russia)	0–2	(England) Chelsea
	Report	Zhirkov 23'; Anelka 43'

Luzhniki Stadium, Moscow
Attendance: 70,012
Referee: Carlos Velasco Carballo (Spain)
19 October 2010
20:45

Marseille (France)	1–0	(Slovakia) Žilina
Diawara 48'	Report

Stade Vélodrome, Marseille
Attendance: 49,250
Referee: István Vad (Hungary)

3 November 2010
20:45 (19:45 UTC+0)

Chelsea (England)	4–1	(Russia) Spartak Moscow
Anelka 49'; Drogba 62' (pen.); Ivanović 66', 90+2'	Report	Bazhenov 86'

Stamford Bridge, London
Attendance: 40,477
Referee: Cüneyt Çakır (Turkey)
3 November 2010
20:45

Žilina (Slovakia)	0–7	(France) Marseille
	Report	Gignac 12', 21', 54'; Heinze 24'; Rémy 36'; González 52', 63'

Štadión pod Dubňom, Žilina
Attendance: 9,664
Referee: Stefan Johannesson (Sweden)

23 November 2010
18:30 (20:30 UTC+3)

Spartak Moscow (Russia)	0–3	(France) Marseille
	Report	Valbuena 18'; Rémy 54'; Brandão 68'

Luzhniki Stadium, Moscow
Attendance: 43,217
Referee: Wolfgang Stark (Germany)
23 November 2010
20:45 (19:45 UTC+0)

Chelsea (England)	2–1	(Slovakia) Žilina
Sturridge 51'; Malouda 86'	Report	Bello 19'

Stamford Bridge, London
Attendance: 40,266
Referee: Robert Schörgenhofer (Austria)

8 December 2010
20:45

Marseille (France)	1–0	(England) Chelsea
Brandão 81'	Report

Stade Vélodrome, Marseille
Attendance: 50,604
Referee: Vladislav Bezborodov (Russia)
8 December 2010
20:45

Žilina (Slovakia)	1–2	(Russia) Spartak Moscow
Majtán 48'	Report	Alex 54'; Ibson 61'

Štadión pod Dubňom, Žilina
Attendance: 7,208
Referee: Kevin Blom (Netherlands)

=== Group G ===
Pos	Team	Pld	W	D	L	GF	GA	GD	Pts	Qualification	RMA	MIL	AJX	AUX
1	(Spain) Real Madrid	6	5	1	0	15	2	+13	16	Advance to knockout phase	—	2–0	2–0	4–0
2	(Italy) Milan	6	2	2	2	7	7	0	8	Advance to knockout phase	2–2	—	0–2	2–0
3	(Netherlands) Ajax	6	2	1	3	6	10	−4	7	Transfer to Europa League	0–4	1–1	—	2–1
4	(France) Auxerre	6	1	0	5	3	12	−9	3		0–1	0–2	2–1	—

Source: Soccerway
15 September 2010
20:45

Real Madrid (Spain)	2–0	(Netherlands) Ajax
Anita 31' (o.g.); Higuaín 73'	Report

Santiago Bernabéu, Madrid
Attendance: 69,639
Referee: Damir Skomina (Slovenia)
15 September 2010
20:45

Milan (Italy)	2–0	(France) Auxerre
Ibrahimović 66', 69'	Report

San Siro, Milan
Attendance: 69,317
Referee: Cristian Balaj (Romania)

28 September 2010
20:45

Auxerre (France)	0–1	(Spain) Real Madrid
	Report	Di María 81'

Stade de l'Abbé-Deschamps, Auxerre
Attendance: 19,525
Referee: Claus Bo Larsen (Denmark)
28 September 2010
20:45

Ajax (Netherlands)	1–1	(Italy) Milan
El Hamdaoui 23'	Report	Ibrahimović 37'

Amsterdam Arena, Amsterdam
Attendance: 51,276
Referee: Felix Brych (Germany)

19 October 2010
20:45

Ajax (Netherlands)	2–1	(France) Auxerre
De Zeeuw 7'; Suárez 41'	Report	Birsa 56'

Amsterdam Arena, Amsterdam
Attendance: 51,383
Referee: Olegário Benquerença (Portugal)
19 October 2010
20:45

Real Madrid (Spain)	2–0	(Italy) Milan
Ronaldo 13'; Özil 14'	Report

Santiago Bernabéu, Madrid
Attendance: 71,657
Referee: Pedro Proença (Portugal)

3 November 2010
20:45

Auxerre (France)	2–1	(Netherlands) Ajax
Sammaritano 9'; Langil 84'	Report	Alderweireld 79'

Stade de l'Abbé-Deschamps, Auxerre
Attendance: 18,727
Referee: Mark Clattenburg (England)
3 November 2010
20:45

Milan (Italy)	2–2	(Spain) Real Madrid
Inzaghi 68', 78'	Report	Higuaín 45'; León 90+4'

San Siro, Milan
Attendance: 76,357
Referee: Howard Webb (England)

23 November 2010
20:45

Ajax (Netherlands)	0–4	(Spain) Real Madrid
	Report	Benzema 36'; Arbeloa 44'; Ronaldo 70', 81' (pen.)

Amsterdam Arena, Amsterdam
Attendance: 48,491
Referee: Craig Thomson (Scotland)
23 November 2010
20:45

Auxerre (France)	0–2	(Italy) Milan
	Report	Ibrahimović 64'; Ronaldinho 90+1'

Stade de l'Abbé-Deschamps, Auxerre
Attendance: 19,244
Referee: Damir Skomina (Slovenia)

8 December 2010
20:45

Real Madrid (Spain)	4–0	(France) Auxerre
Benzema 12', 72', 88'; Ronaldo 49'	Report

Santiago Bernabéu, Madrid
Attendance: 54,917
Referee: Serge Gumienny (Belgium)
8 December 2010
20:45

Milan (Italy)	0–2	(Netherlands) Ajax
	Report	De Zeeuw 57'; Alderweireld 66'

San Siro, Milan
Attendance: 72,960
Referee: Claus Bo Larsen (Denmark)

=== Group H ===
Pos	Team	Pld	W	D	L	GF	GA	GD	Pts	Qualification	SHK	ARS	BRA	PTZ
1	(Ukraine) Shakhtar Donetsk	6	5	0	1	12	6	+6	15	Advance to knockout phase	—	2–1	2–0	1–0
2	(England) Arsenal	6	4	0	2	18	7	+11	12	Advance to knockout phase	5–1	—	6–0	3–1
3	(Portugal) Braga	6	3	0	3	5	11	−6	9	Transfer to Europa League	0–3	2–0	—	2–0
4	(Serbia) Partizan	6	0	0	6	2	13	−11	0		0–3	1–3	0–1	—

Source: Soccerway
15 September 2010
20:45 (19:45 UTC+1)

Arsenal (England)	6–0	(Portugal) Braga
Fàbregas 9' (pen.), 53'; Arshavin 30'; Chamakh 34'; Vela 69', 84'	Report

Emirates Stadium, London
Attendance: 59,333
Referee: Alain Hamer (Luxembourg)
15 September 2010
20:45 (21:45 UTC+3)

Shakhtar Donetsk (Ukraine)	1–0	(Serbia) Partizan
Srna 71'	Report

Donbas Arena, Donetsk
Attendance: 48,512
Referee: Carlos Velasco Carballo (Spain)

28 September 2010
20:45

Partizan (Serbia)	1–3	(England) Arsenal
Cléo 33' (pen.)	Report	Arshavin 15'; Chamakh 71'; Squillaci 82'

Partizan Stadium, Belgrade
Attendance: 29,348
Referee: Wolfgang Stark (Germany)
28 September 2010
20:45 (19:45 UTC+1)

Braga (Portugal)	0–3	(Ukraine) Shakhtar Donetsk
	Report	Luiz Adriano 56', 72'; Douglas Costa 90+2' (pen.)

Estádio Municipal, Braga
Attendance: 12,083
Referee: Kevin Blom (Netherlands)

19 October 2010
20:45 (19:45 UTC+1)

Braga (Portugal)	2–0	(Serbia) Partizan
Lima 35'; Matheus 90'	Report

Estádio Municipal, Braga
Attendance: 11,454
Referee: Laurent Duhamel (France)
19 October 2010
20:45 (19:45 UTC+1)

Arsenal (England)	5–1	(Ukraine) Shakhtar Donetsk
Song 19'; Nasri 42'; Fàbregas 60' (pen.); Wilshere 66'; Chamakh 69'	Report	Eduardo 82'

Emirates Stadium, London
Attendance: 60,016
Referee: Svein Oddvar Moen (Norway)

3 November 2010
20:45

Partizan (Serbia)	0–1	(Portugal) Braga
	Report	Moisés 35'

Partizan Stadium, Belgrade
Attendance: 28,295
Referee: Martin Hansson (Sweden)
3 November 2010
20:45 (21:45 UTC+2)

Shakhtar Donetsk (Ukraine)	2–1	(England) Arsenal
Chyhrynskyi 28'; Eduardo 45'	Report	Walcott 10'

Donbas Arena, Donetsk
Attendance: 51,153
Referee: Massimo Busacca (Switzerland)

23 November 2010
20:45 (19:45 UTC+0)

Braga (Portugal)	2–0	(England) Arsenal
Matheus 83', 90+3'	Report

Estádio Municipal, Braga
Attendance: 14,809
Referee: Viktor Kassai (Hungary)
23 November 2010
20:45

Partizan (Serbia)	0–3	(Ukraine) Shakhtar Donetsk
	Report	Stepanenko 52'; Jádson 59'; Eduardo 68'

Partizan Stadium, Belgrade
Attendance: 17,473
Referee: Frank De Bleeckere (Belgium)

8 December 2010
20:45 (19:45 UTC+0)

Arsenal (England)	3–1	(Serbia) Partizan
Van Persie 30' (pen.); Walcott 73'; Nasri 77'	Report	Cléo 52'

Emirates Stadium, London
Attendance: 58,845
Referee: Paolo Tagliavento (Italy)
8 December 2010
20:45 (21:45 UTC+2)

Shakhtar Donetsk (Ukraine)	2–0	(Portugal) Braga
Raț 78'; Luiz Adriano 83'	Report

Donbas Arena, Donetsk
Attendance: 47,627
Referee: Felix Brych (Germany)
