= Rhema Obed =

English footballer

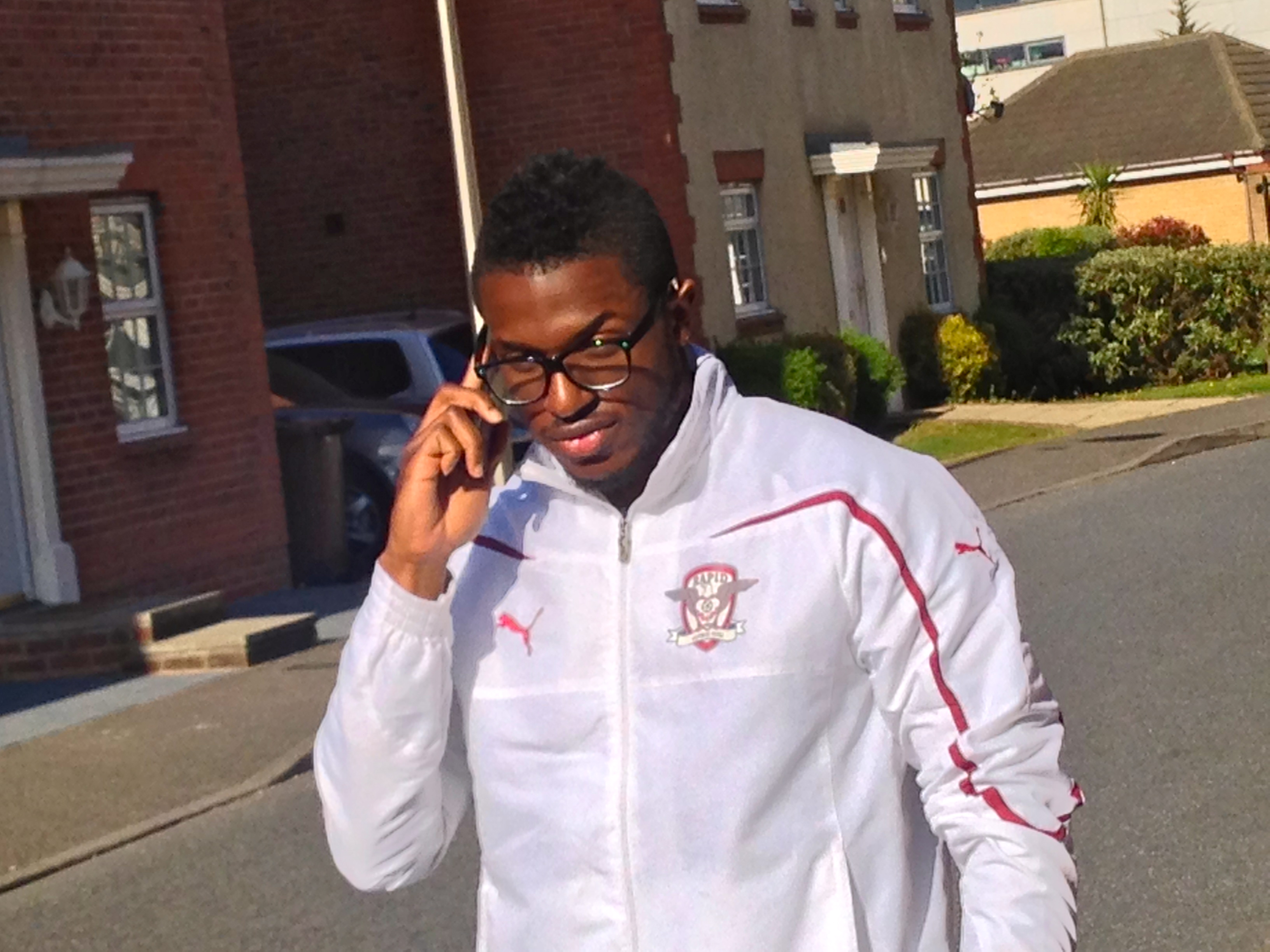
- Obed with Rapid Bucharest

Personal information
- Full name: Rhema Chukwardiamara Obed
- Date of birth: 11 September 1991 (age 35)
- Place of birth: London, England
- Height: 1.80 m (5 ft 11 in)
- Position: Central midfielder

Youth career
- 2004–2010: Arsenal

Senior career*
Years	Team	Apps	(Gls)
2012	Geylang United	12	(1)
2012	Sektzia Ness Ziona	?	(?)
2013	Ethnikos Gazoros	8	(0)
2013–2014	Rapid Bucharest	2	(0)
2014–2015	Sheffield	18	(0)
2015	Krško	8	(0)

International career^{‡}
2006	England U16	1	(0)
- * Club domestic league appearances and goals as of 23:47, 8 October 2015 (UTC) ‡ National team caps and goals as of 00:00, 1 January 2007 (UTC)

Rhema Chukwardiamara Obed (born 11 September 1991) is an English footballer who last played as a defensive midfielder for Krško in the Slovenian PrvaLiga.

== Club career ==
=== Arsenal Youth ===
Obed first signed for Arsenal in 2004 as a schoolboy at the age of 13 signing scholarship terms in 2008. A product of the Arsenal Academy, Obed came to prominence during the Gunners' 2008–09 Premier Academy League and 2009–10 Premier Academy League.

During a trial with Danish Superliga club OB in 2010, he appeared in the Danish Reserves League on 23 November. He also had trials with Norwich City, Queens Park Rangers and Leeds United after his release by Arsenal.

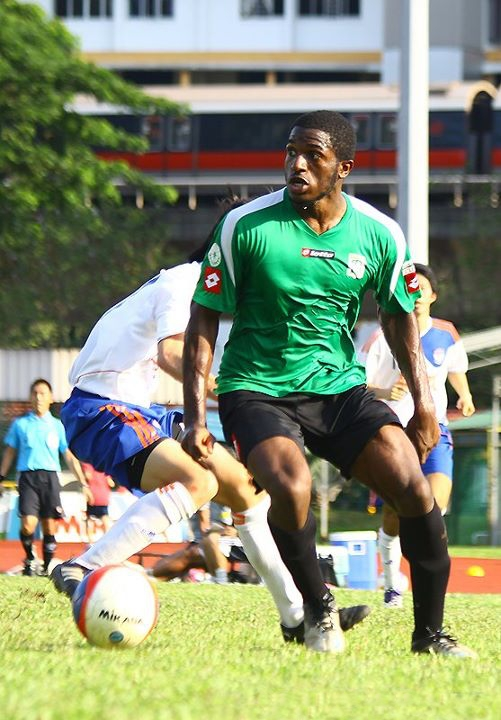
Rhema Obed playing For Geylang United in 2012

=== Geylang International ===
In January 2012 Obed signed for Geylang United. On 23 March, he scored his first goal for the club, putting the Eagles ahead in the ninth minute with a right-footed volley against Balestier Khalsa. Within the same year, Obed was invited to attend Hapoel Tel Aviv's pre-season training camp in Hungary. Although he impressed with two assists in three games, Hapoel Tel Aviv opted out of signing him, rather choosing to sign the former Manchester United midfielder Eric Djemba-Djemba.

Whilst playing for Hapoel Tel Aviv, Sektzia Ness Ziona enquired about Rhema's availability, which prompted him to sign a 1-year deal, but he left in September.

=== Ethnikos Gazoros ===
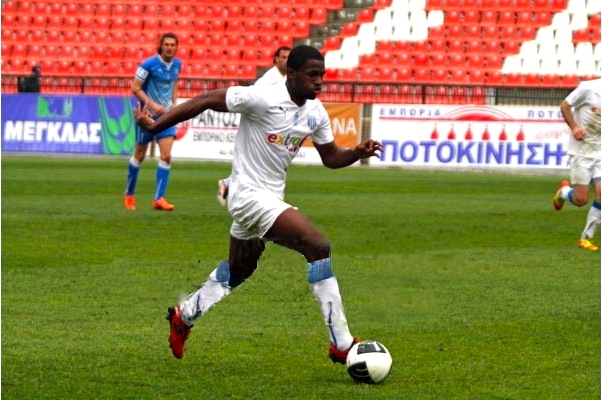
Rhema Obed Playing For Ethinkos Gazoros

On 28 January 2013, Obed signed for Ethnikos Gazoros in Football League of Greece. totalling 8 appearances for half the season.

=== Rapid Bucharest ===
Obed signed for Rapid Bucharest in Romania on a 3-year contract, but left in 2014 due to unpaid wages.

=== Sheffield ===
In July 2014 he joined Sheffield of Northern Premier League Division One South, at level 8 of the English football league system.

=== Krško ===
Ahead of the 2015–16 Slovenian PrvaLiga season he joined newly promoted Krško, but left again in October the same year.

== Style of play ==
Obed plays primarily as a defensive midfielder, His key strengths are his physical ability and dribbling, often switching from defensive to offences stances as the match progresses.

== International career ==
Obed is eligible to represent Nigeria due to him being of Nigerian descent. In 2006, he played for the England national under-16 football team.

== Honours ==
Arsenal

- Premier Academy League: 2008–09, 2009–10
