= István Vad =

Hungarian football referee

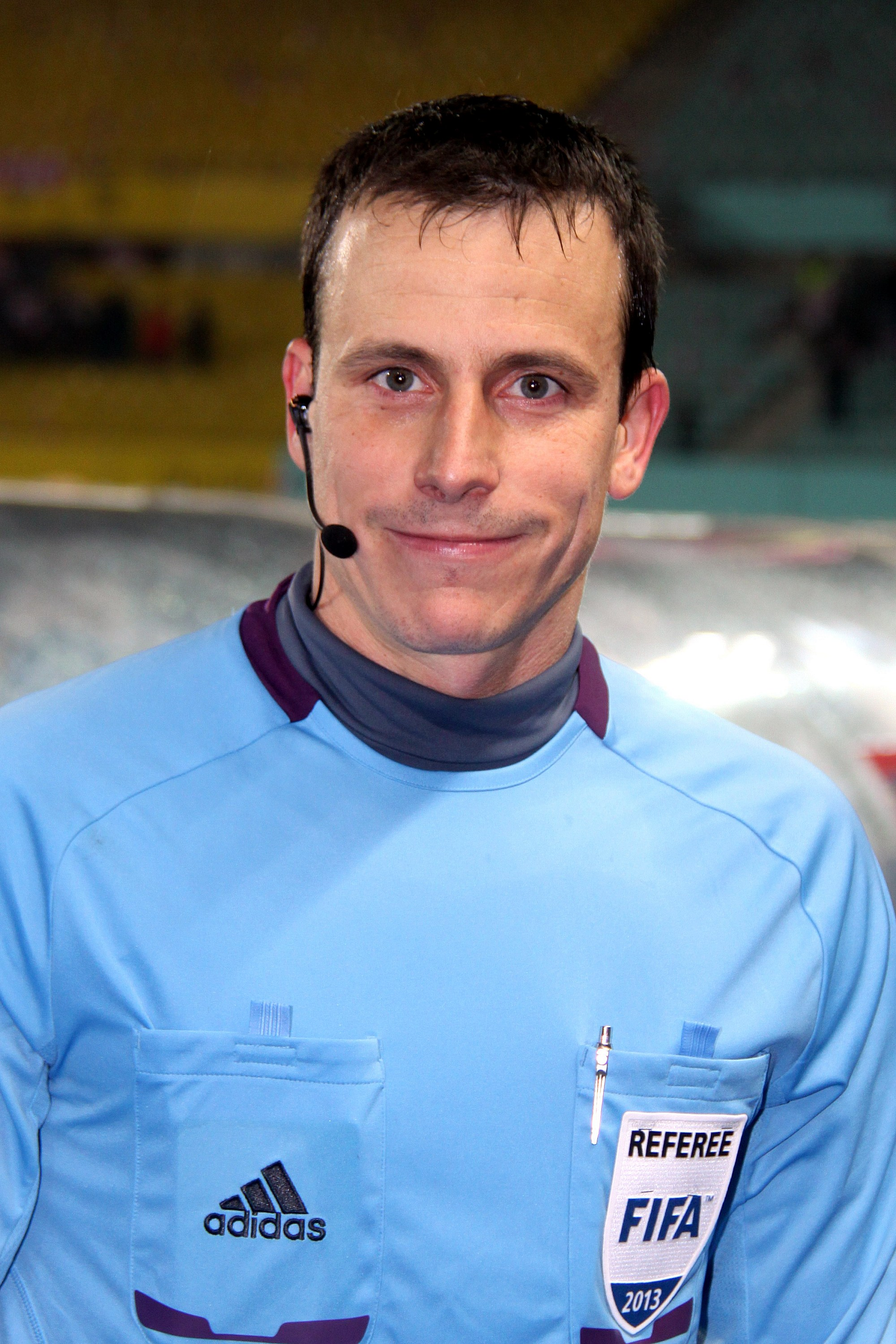
- Full name: István Vad
- Born: 30 May 1979 (age 47)

Domestic
Years	League	Role
2004–	Nemzeti Bajnokság I	Referee

International
Years	League	Role
2007–	UEFA	Referee
2007–	FIFA	Referee

István Vad (born 30 May 1979) is a Hungarian football referee. He has been an international FIFA-listed official since 2007. His father, István Vad Sr., was also an international referee who previously played as a forward for Ferencváros, while his grandfather (also named István Vad) was a referee in Hungary. His sister, Anita Vad, also referees football. Because of his footballing lineage, Vad is known in Hungary as István Vad II.

After being promoted to the FIFA list of international referees at the start of 2007, Vad took charge of his first matches in European competition in July 2007. He refereed his first senior international game in October 2008, followed by his first foray into the group stage of the UEFA Europa League a year later. In 2010–11, he took charge of his first match in the group stage of the UEFA Champions League, and capped the season by being named as the fourth official for the 2011 UEFA Champions League Final.

He worked as the additional assistant referee in a UEFA Euro 2012 match between England and Ukraine.
