= 2010–11 UEFA Champions League knockout phase =

International football competition

The knockout phase of the 2010–11 UEFA Champions League began on 15 February and concluded on 28 May 2011 with the final at Wembley Stadium in London, England. The knockout phase involved the 16 teams who finished in the top two in each of their groups in the group stage.

Times are CET/CEST, (Note: CET (UTC+1) for matches to 16 March 2011, and CEST (UTC+2) for matches from 5 April 2011.) as listed by UEFA (local times, if different, are in parentheses).

== Format ==
Each tie in the knockout phase, apart from the final, was played over two legs, with each team playing one leg at home. The team that had the higher aggregate score over the two legs progressed to the next round. If aggregate scores finish level, the away goals rule was applied, i.e. the team that scored more goals away from home over the two legs progressed. If away goals were also equal, then 30 minutes of extra time were played, divided into two 15-minute halves. The away goals rule was again applied after extra time, i.e. if there were goals scored during extra time and the aggregate score was still level, the visiting team qualified by more away goals scored. If no goals were scored during extra time, the tie was decided by a penalty shoot-out. In the final, the tie was played as a single match. If scores were level at the end of normal time in the final, extra time was played, followed by penalties if scores remained tied.

In the draw for the round of 16, each of the eight group winners was drawn against a second-place team, with the group winners hosting the second leg. Teams from the same group or the same association were not allowed to be drawn against each other. There was a single draw after the round of 16 that determined the pairings for all subsequent rounds. For this draw, there were no seedings, and teams from the same group or the same association could be drawn with each other.

The draw mechanism for each round is as follows:

- In the draw for the round of 16, matches were played between the winners of one group and the runners-up of a different group, with the group winner hosting the second leg. Teams from the same group or the same association cannot be drawn against each other.
- From the quarter-finals onwards, these restrictions did not apply and teams from the same group or same associations may be drawn against each other.

== Round and draw dates ==
All draws were held at UEFA headquarters in Nyon, Switzerland.

Round	Draw date and time	First leg	Second leg
Round of 16	17 December 2010; 12:00 CET	15–16 & 22–23 February 2011	8–9 & 15–16 March 2011
Quarter-finals	18 March 2011; 12:00 CET	5–6 April 2011	12–13 April 2011
Semi-finals	18 March 2011; 12:00 CET	26–27 April 2011	3–4 May 2011
Final	18 March 2011; 12:00 CET	28 May 2011 at Wembley Stadium, London	

== Qualified teams ==
Key to colours
Seeded in round of 16 draw
Unseeded in round of 16 draw

Group	Winners	Runners-up
A	(England) Tottenham Hotspur	(Italy) Internazionale
B	(Germany) Schalke 04	(France) Lyon
C	(England) Manchester United	(Spain) Valencia
D	(Spain) Barcelona	(Denmark) Copenhagen
E	(Germany) Bayern Munich	(Italy) Roma
F	(England) Chelsea	(France) Marseille
G	(Spain) Real Madrid	(Italy) Milan
H	(Ukraine) Shakhtar Donetsk	(England) Arsenal

== Bracket ==
Round of 16
(France) Lyon	1	0	1
(Spain) Real Madrid	1	3	4
(Italy) Milan	0	0	0
(England) Tottenham Hotspur	1	0	1
(England) Arsenal	2	1	3
(Spain) Barcelona	1	3	4
(Italy) Roma	2	0	2
(Ukraine) Shakhtar Donetsk	3	3	6
(Italy) Internazionale (a)	0	3	3
(Germany) Bayern Munich	1	2	3
(Spain) Valencia	1	1	2
(Germany) Schalke 04	1	3	4
(Denmark) Copenhagen	0	0	0
(England) Chelsea	2	0	2
(France) Marseille	0	1	1
(England) Manchester United	0	2	2

Quarter-finals
(Spain) Real Madrid	4	1	5
(England) Tottenham Hotspur	0	0	0
(Spain) Barcelona	5	1	6
(Ukraine) Shakhtar Donetsk	1	0	1
(Italy) Internazionale	2	1	3
(Germany) Schalke 04	5	2	7
(England) Chelsea	0	1	1
(England) Manchester United	1	2	3

Semi-finals
(Spain) Real Madrid	0	1	1
(Spain) Barcelona	2	1	3
(Germany) Schalke 04	0	1	1
(England) Manchester United	2	4	6

Final
28 May – London
(Spain) Barcelona	3
(England) Manchester United	1

== Round of 16 ==
=== Summary ===
The draw for the round of 16 was held on 17 December 2010. The first legs of the round of 16 were played on 15, 16, 22 and 23 February, and the second legs were played on 8, 9, 15 and 16 March 2011.

Team 1	Agg.	Team 2	1st leg	2nd leg
Roma (Italy)	2–6	(Ukraine) Shakhtar Donetsk	2–3	0–3
Milan (Italy)	0–1	(England) Tottenham Hotspur	0–1	0–0
Valencia (Spain)	2–4	(Germany) Schalke 04	1–1	1–3
Internazionale (Italy)	3–3 (a)	(Germany) Bayern Munich	0–1	3–2
Lyon (France)	1–4	(Spain) Real Madrid	1–1	0–3
Arsenal (England)	3–4	(Spain) Barcelona	2–1	1–3
Marseille (France)	1–2	(England) Manchester United	0–0	1–2
Copenhagen (Denmark)	0–2	(England) Chelsea	0–2	0–0

=== Matches ===
16 February 2011
20:45

Roma (Italy)	2–3	(Ukraine) Shakhtar Donetsk
Raț 28' (o.g.); Ménez 61'	Report	Jádson 29'; Douglas Costa 36'; Luiz Adriano 41'

Stadio Olimpico, Rome
Attendance: 35,873
Referee: Olegário Benquerença (Portugal)
8 March 2011
20:45 (21:45 UTC+2)

Shakhtar Donetsk (Ukraine)	3–0	(Italy) Roma
Willian 18', 58'; Eduardo 87'	Report

Donbas Arena, Donetsk
Attendance: 46,543
Referee: Howard Webb (England)

Shakhtar Donetsk won 6–2 on aggregate.

15 February 2011
20:45

Milan (Italy)	0–1	(England) Tottenham Hotspur
	Report	Crouch 80'

San Siro, Milan
Attendance: 75,652
Referee: Stéphane Lannoy (France)
9 March 2011
20:45 (19:45 UTC+0)

Tottenham Hotspur (England)	0–0	(Italy) Milan
	Report

White Hart Lane, London
Attendance: 34,320
Referee: Frank De Bleeckere (Belgium)

Tottenham Hotspur won 1–0 on aggregate.

15 February 2011
20:45

Valencia (Spain)	1–1	(Germany) Schalke 04
Soldado 17'	Report	Raúl 64'

Mestalla, Valencia
Attendance: 42,703
Referee: Aleksei Nikolaev (Russia)
9 March 2011
20:45

Schalke 04 (Germany)	3–1	(Spain) Valencia
Farfán 40', 90+4'; Gavranović 52'	Report	R. Costa 17'

Veltins-Arena, Gelsenkirchen
Attendance: 53,517
Referee: Jonas Eriksson (Sweden)

Schalke 04 won 4–2 on aggregate.

23 February 2011
20:45

Internazionale (Italy)	0–1	(Germany) Bayern Munich
	Report	Gómez 90'

San Siro, Milan
Attendance: 75,925
Referee: Viktor Kassai (Hungary)
15 March 2011
20:45

Bayern Munich (Germany)	2–3	(Italy) Internazionale
Gómez 21'; Müller 31'	Report	Eto'o 4'; Sneijder 63'; Pandev 88'

Allianz Arena, Munich
Attendance: 66,000
Referee: Pedro Proença (Portugal)

3–3 on aggregate; Internazionale won on away goals.

22 February 2011
20:45

Lyon (France)	1–1	(Spain) Real Madrid
Gomis 83'	Report	Benzema 65'

Stade de Gerland, Lyon
Attendance: 40,299
Referee: Wolfgang Stark (Germany)
16 March 2011
20:45

Real Madrid (Spain)	3–0	(France) Lyon
Marcelo 37'; Benzema 66'; Di María 76'	Report

Santiago Bernabéu, Madrid
Attendance: 70,034
Referee: Damir Skomina (Slovenia)

Real Madrid won 4–1 on aggregate.

16 February 2011
20:45 (19:45 UTC+0)

Arsenal (England)	2–1	(Spain) Barcelona
Van Persie 78'; Arshavin 83'	Report	Villa 26'

Emirates Stadium, London
Attendance: 59,927
Referee: Nicola Rizzoli (Italy)
8 March 2011
20:45

Barcelona (Spain)	3–1	(England) Arsenal
Messi 45+3', 71' (pen.); Xavi 69'	Report	Busquets 53' (o.g.)

Camp Nou, Barcelona
Attendance: 95,486
Referee: Massimo Busacca (Switzerland)

Barcelona won 4–3 on aggregate.

23 February 2011
20:45

Marseille (France)	0–0	(England) Manchester United
	Report

Stade Vélodrome, Marseille
Attendance: 57,957
Referee: Felix Brych (Germany)
15 March 2011
20:45 (19:45 UTC+0)

Manchester United (England)	2–1	(France) Marseille
Hernández 5', 75'	Report	Brown 82' (o.g.)

Old Trafford, Manchester
Attendance: 73,996
Referee: Carlos Velasco Carballo (Spain)

Manchester United won 2–1 on aggregate.

22 February 2011
20:45

Copenhagen (Denmark)	0–2	(England) Chelsea
	Report	Anelka 17', 54'

Parken Stadium, Copenhagen
Attendance: 36,713
Referee: Björn Kuipers (Netherlands)
16 March 2011
20:45 (19:45 UTC+0)

Chelsea (England)	0–0	(Denmark) Copenhagen
	Report

Stamford Bridge, London
Attendance: 36,454
Referee: Svein Oddvar Moen (Norway)

Chelsea won 2–0 on aggregate.

== Quarter-finals ==
=== Summary ===
The draw for the quarter-finals was held on 18 March 2011. The first legs were played on 5 and 6 April, and the second legs were played on 12 and 13 April 2011.

Team 1	Agg.	Team 2	1st leg	2nd leg
Real Madrid (Spain)	5–0	(England) Tottenham Hotspur	4–0	1–0
Chelsea (England)	1–3	(England) Manchester United	0–1	1–2
Barcelona (Spain)	6–1	(Ukraine) Shakhtar Donetsk	5–1	1–0
Internazionale (Italy)	3–7	(Germany) Schalke 04	2–5	1–2

=== Matches ===
5 April 2011
20:45

Real Madrid (Spain)	4–0	(England) Tottenham Hotspur
Adebayor 4', 57'; Di María 72'; Ronaldo 87'	Report

Santiago Bernabéu, Madrid
Attendance: 71,657
Referee: Felix Brych (Germany)
13 April 2011
20:45 (19:45 UTC+1)

Tottenham Hotspur (England)	0–1	(Spain) Real Madrid
	Report	Ronaldo 50'

White Hart Lane, London
Attendance: 34,311
Referee: Nicola Rizzoli (Italy)

Real Madrid won 5–0 on aggregate.

6 April 2011
20:45 (19:45 UTC+1)

Chelsea (England)	0–1	(England) Manchester United
	Report	Rooney 24'

Stamford Bridge, London
Attendance: 37,915
Referee: Alberto Undiano Mallenco (Spain)
12 April 2011
20:45 (19:45 UTC+1)

Manchester United (England)	2–1	(England) Chelsea
Hernández 43'; Park Ji-sung 78'	Report	Drogba 77'

Old Trafford, Manchester
Attendance: 74,672
Referee: Olegário Benquerença (Portugal)

Manchester United won 3–1 on aggregate.

6 April 2011
20:45

Barcelona (Spain)	5–1	(Ukraine) Shakhtar Donetsk
Iniesta 2'; Dani Alves 34'; Piqué 53'; Keita 61'; Xavi 86'	Report	Rakitskiy 60'

Camp Nou, Barcelona
Attendance: 86,518
Referee: Craig Thomson (Scotland)
12 April 2011
20:45 (21:45 UTC+3)

Shakhtar Donetsk (Ukraine)	0–1	(Spain) Barcelona
	Report	Messi 43'

Donbass Arena, Donetsk
Attendance: 51,759
Referee: Florian Meyer (Germany)

Barcelona won 6–1 on aggregate.

5 April 2011
20:45

Internazionale (Italy)	2–5	(Germany) Schalke 04
Stanković 1'; Milito 34'	Report	Matip 17'; Edu 40', 75'; Raúl 53'; Ranocchia 57' (o.g.)

San Siro, Milan
Attendance: 72,770
Referee: Martin Atkinson (England)
13 April 2011
20:45

Schalke 04 (Germany)	2–1	(Italy) Internazionale
Raúl 45'; Höwedes 81'	Report	Motta 49'

Veltins-Arena, Gelsenkirchen
Attendance: 54,142
Referee: Damir Skomina (Slovenia)

Schalke 04 won 7–3 on aggregate.

== Semi-finals ==
=== Summary ===
The draw for the semi-finals was held on 18 March 2011, after the quarter-final draw. The first legs were played on 26 and 27 April, and the second legs were played on 3 and 4 May 2011.

Team 1	Agg.	Team 2	1st leg	2nd leg
Schalke 04 (Germany)	1–6	(England) Manchester United	0–2	1–4
Real Madrid (Spain)	1–3	(Spain) Barcelona	0–2	1–1

=== Matches ===
26 April 2011
20:45

Schalke 04 (Germany)	0–2	(England) Manchester United
	Report	Giggs 67'; Rooney 69'

Veltins-Arena, Gelsenkirchen
Attendance: 54,142
Referee: Carlos Velasco Carballo (Spain)
4 May 2011
20:45 (19:45 UTC+1)

Manchester United (England)	4–1	(Germany) Schalke 04
Valencia 26'; Gibson 31'; Anderson 72', 76'	Report	Jurado 35'

Old Trafford, Manchester
Attendance: 74,687
Referee: Pedro Proença (Portugal)

Manchester United won 6–1 on aggregate.

27 April 2011
20:45

Real Madrid (Spain)	0–2	(Spain) Barcelona
	Report	Messi 76', 87'

Santiago Bernabéu, Madrid
Attendance: 71,567
Referee: Wolfgang Stark (Germany)
3 May 2011
20:45

Barcelona (Spain)	1–1	(Spain) Real Madrid
Pedro 54'	Report	Marcelo 64'

Camp Nou, Barcelona
Attendance: 95,701
Referee: Frank De Bleeckere (Belgium)

Barcelona won 3–1 on aggregate.

== Final ==
The 2011 UEFA Champions League Final was played on 28 May 2011 at Wembley Stadium in London, England. A draw was held on 18 March 2011, after the quarter-final and semi-final draws, to determine the "home" team for administrative purposes.

28 May 2011
20:45 (19:45 UTC+1)

Barcelona (Spain)	3–1	(England) Manchester United
Pedro 27'; Messi 54'; Villa 69'	Report	Rooney 34'

Wembley Stadium, London
Attendance: 87,695
Referee: Viktor Kassai (Hungary)
