= Cesc Fàbregas =

Spanish football manager and player (born 1987)

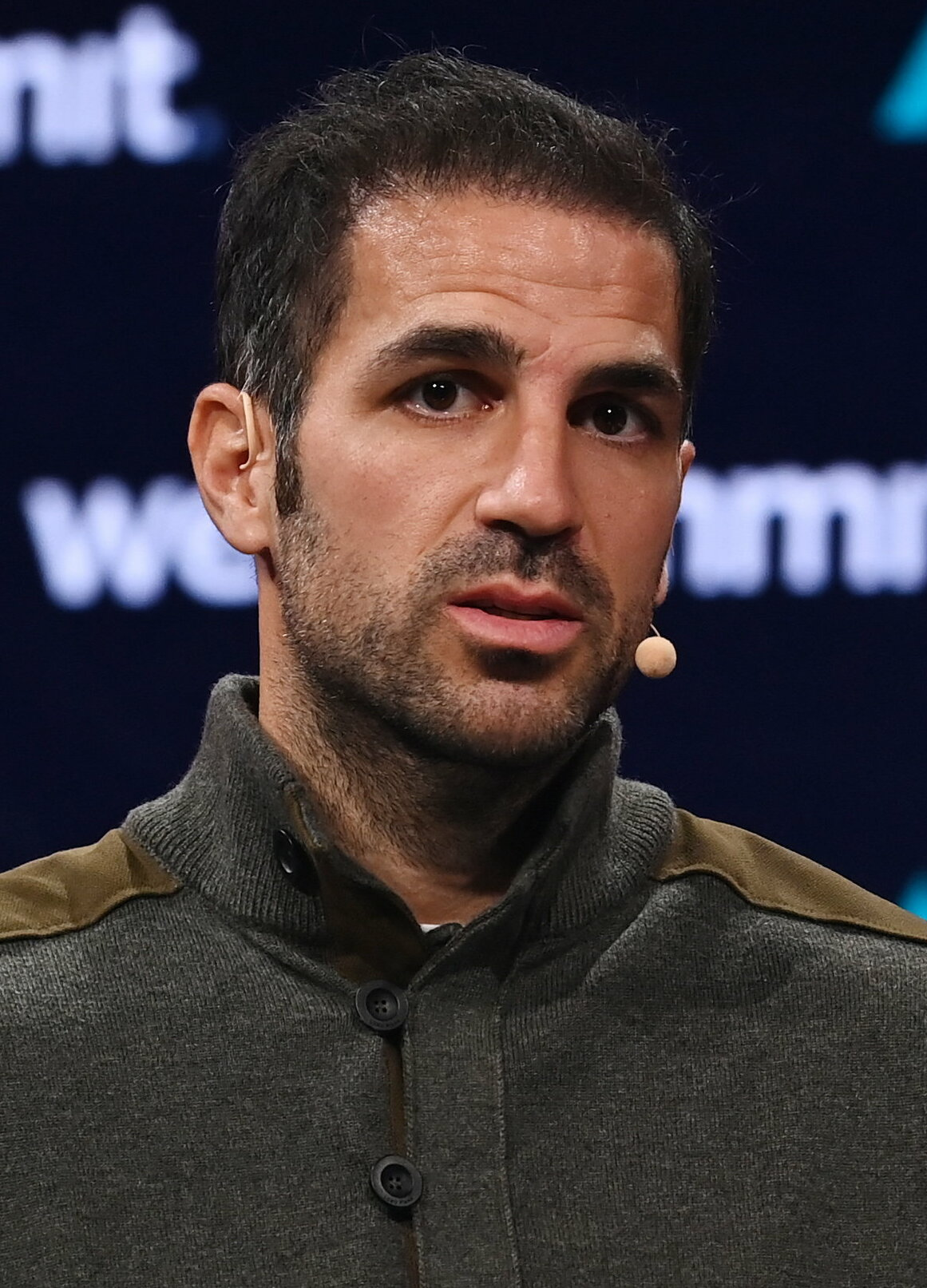
- Fàbregas in 2023

Personal information
- Full name: Francesc Fàbregas Soler
- Date of birth: 4 May 1987 (age 39)
- Place of birth: Arenys de Mar, Spain
- Height: 1.79 m (5 ft 10 in)
- Position: Central midfielder

Team information
- Current team: Como (head coach)

Youth career
- 1995–1997: Mataró
- 1997–2003: Barcelona
- 2003: Arsenal

Senior career*
Years	Team	Apps	(Gls)
2003–2011	Arsenal	212	(35)
2011–2014	Barcelona	96	(28)
2014–2019	Chelsea	138	(15)
2019–2022	Monaco	54	(3)
2022	Monaco B	1	(0)
2022–2023	Como	17	(0)
Total		518	(81)

International career
2002–2003	Spain U16	8	(0)
2003–2004	Spain U17	14	(7)
2005	Spain U20	5	(0)
2004–2005	Spain U21	12	(8)
2006–2016	Spain	110	(15)

Managerial career
- 2023: Como (interim)
- 2024–: Como
Medal record
Representing Spain
FIFA World Cup
Winner	2010 South Africa
UEFA European Championship
Winner	2008 Austria–Switzerland
Winner	2012 Poland–Ukraine
FIFA U-17 World Cup
Runner-up	2003 Finland
UEFA European Under-17 Championship
Runner-up	2004 France
- * Club domestic league appearances and goals

Francesc "Cesc" Fàbregas Soler (Catalan: [ˈsɛsk ˈfaβɾəɣəs], Spanish: [ˈθesk ˈfaβɾeɣas]; born 4 May 1987) is a Spanish professional football manager and former player who played as a central midfielder. He is the head coach of Serie A club Como.

Fàbregas came through La Masia, Barcelona's youth academy, leaving at 16 when he was signed by Premier League club Arsenal in September 2003. Following injuries to key midfielders in the early part of the 2004–05 season, he went on establish himself in the team. He broke several of the club's records and won the FA Cup in 2005. His performances earned him recognition, being named in the UEFA Team of the Year twice and the PFA Team of the Year twice.

After a protracted transfer saga, Fàbregas left London in August 2011 to return to Barcelona in a deal worth up to £35 million. During his three-year spell at the Camp Nou, Fàbregas played alongside Xavi and Andrés Iniesta and won a La Liga title, the Copa del Rey, the FIFA Club World Cup, the UEFA Super Cup, and two Spanish Super Cups. He returned to London in June 2014 to Arsenal's cross-town rivals Chelsea for a fee of £30 million. In four-and-a-half years at the club, he won the Premier League twice, and the League Cup, FA Cup, and UEFA Europa League once each. He left for free to Ligue 1 club Monaco in January 2019 and retired in 2023, after one year in the Italian Serie B with Como.

Internationally, Fàbregas made his debut for the Spain national team in March 2006. He represented his country in the World Cup in 2006, 2010, and 2014, in the European Championship in 2008, 2012, and 2016, and in the Confederations Cup in 2009 and 2013. He was a key figure in Spain's European Championship victories in 2008 and 2012 and their 2010 World Cup triumph, in which he supplied the assist for Andrés Iniesta's winning goal in the final. In October 2015, Fàbregas earned his 100th cap for Spain.

== Early years ==
Born in Arenys de Mar, Barcelona, Catalonia, to Francesc Fàbregas Sr., who runs a property company, and Núria Soler, the owner of a pastry company, Fàbregas has supported FC Barcelona since childhood and went to his first match when he was nine months old with his grandfather.

He began his club football career with CE Mataró before being signed for Barcelona's La Masia youth academy aged ten in 1997. It is said that his first coach, Señor Blai, limited Fàbregas' appearances in matches against Barcelona to reduce the risk of him being scouted by the club, though he eventually joined their academy. Despite initial attempts to retain him, Mataró eventually permitted Fàbregas to train with Barcelona one day per week. Eventually Fàbregas joined Barcelona's academy full-time. His initial training was as a defensive midfielder playing alongside notable names such as Gerard Piqué and Lionel Messi. Fàbregas was a prolific scorer at the youth level, occasionally scoring over 30 goals in a season, but he did not make a first-team game at the Camp Nou. During his time at Barcelona's youth academy, Fàbregas idolised Barcelona's then-captain and number four Pep Guardiola, who would later give Fàbregas his shirt as consolation when Fàbregas' parents divorced.

== Club career ==
=== Arsenal ===
==== Adapting to England ====
Sensing that he would have limited opportunities at Barcelona, Fàbregas joined Premier League club Arsenal in their Academy, signing for the London club on 11 September 2003. Initially, he found life difficult in England's capital but soon struck a friendship with Spanish-speaking teammate Philippe Senderos, who helped him settle down. As a 16-year-old, Fàbregas did not contemplate breaking into the first team immediately but looked up to senior players like Patrick Vieira and Gilberto Silva, while concentrating on training and learning the English language. He nevertheless made his debut for Arsenal not long after, on 28 October 2003, in a League Cup tie at home to Rotherham United. In doing so, he became Arsenal's youngest-ever first team player, aged 16 years and 177 days. He then became the youngest goalscorer in Arsenal's history in a later round of the League Cup, scoring in a 5–1 victory against Wolverhampton Wanderers. Although Arsenal went on to win the league unbeaten in the 2003–04 season, Fàbregas was not awarded a winner's medal because he did not play a single league game.

It was not until the start of the 2004–05 season that the Spaniard started making first team appearances in matches outside the League Cup. His first match of the season was against Manchester United in the FA Community Shield. Following an injury to Vieira, Fàbregas stepped in and made four consecutive Premier League starts. He was praised for his performances in those games, even claiming a goal against Blackburn Rovers in a 3–0 victory, and becoming Arsenal's youngest-ever goalscorer in a league game. With further injuries to Edu and Gilberto Silva, he received more playing time in all competitions. He signed his first professional contract with Arsenal in September 2004, which committed his long-term future to the club. In October 2004, Arsenal lost 2–0 to Manchester United, ending their 49-match unbeaten run in the Premier League. The match was dubbed the "Battle of the Buffet" after pizza was thrown at Manchester United manager Sir Alex Ferguson at the end of the match in the players' tunnel by a then-unknown Arsenal player. Speculation that the player was Fàbregas was confirmed in November 2011 by former Arsenal player Martin Keown on a phone-in show on BBC Radio 5 Live. In the 2004–05 UEFA Champions League, he became the second-youngest goalscorer in the competition's history after scoring the third goal against Rosenborg in a 5–1 win. He concluded his season by winning his first honours with Arsenal when he was in the starting eleven that defeated Manchester United on penalties in the 2005 FA Cup Final.

==== Making the starting eleven ====
He featured regularly in the Arsenal central midfield alongside Gilberto Silva. He made 49 appearances in all competitions during the 2005–06 season. Despite his young age, his performances came under greater scrutiny due to his increased involvement in the first team. Further, as Fàbregas possessed a smaller frame and played with less aggression than Vieira, there were initially doubts over his ability to fill in the void left by the Frenchman. Nevertheless, Fàbregas asserted his own style of play and impressed pundits in the Champions League against Real Madrid and Juventus. In the latter, he scored Arsenal's first goal and set up Thierry Henry for the second, at the same time proving that he could compete against tough, hard-tackling midfielders like Vieira. He then played in the Final against his former club Barcelona, but Arsenal were defeated 2–1, completing a trophyless 2005–06 campaign for Arsenal.

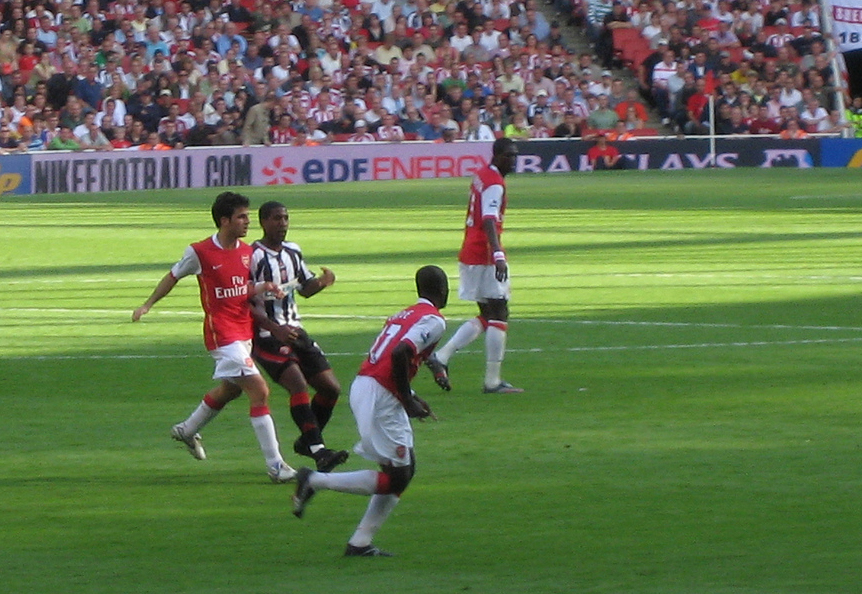
Fàbregas (left) in a game against Sheffield United in September 2006

Fàbregas' increase in exposure drew transfer speculation during the summer; Real Madrid expressed a desire to sign the Spaniard despite his long-term contract with Arsenal, but Arsenal manager Arsène Wenger stated that Arsenal would not listen to any offers. Fàbregas was also given the number 4 shirt, which had been vacated by Patrick Vieira following his transfer to Juventus the previous year. In September 2006, with six years left on his deal, Arsenal offered a new five-year deal (with an option to extend by a further three years) to the midfielder, which he signed on 19 October 2006. While the contract was unusually long, Fàbregas cited Arsenal's playing style and Wenger as reasons for his long-term commitment to the club.

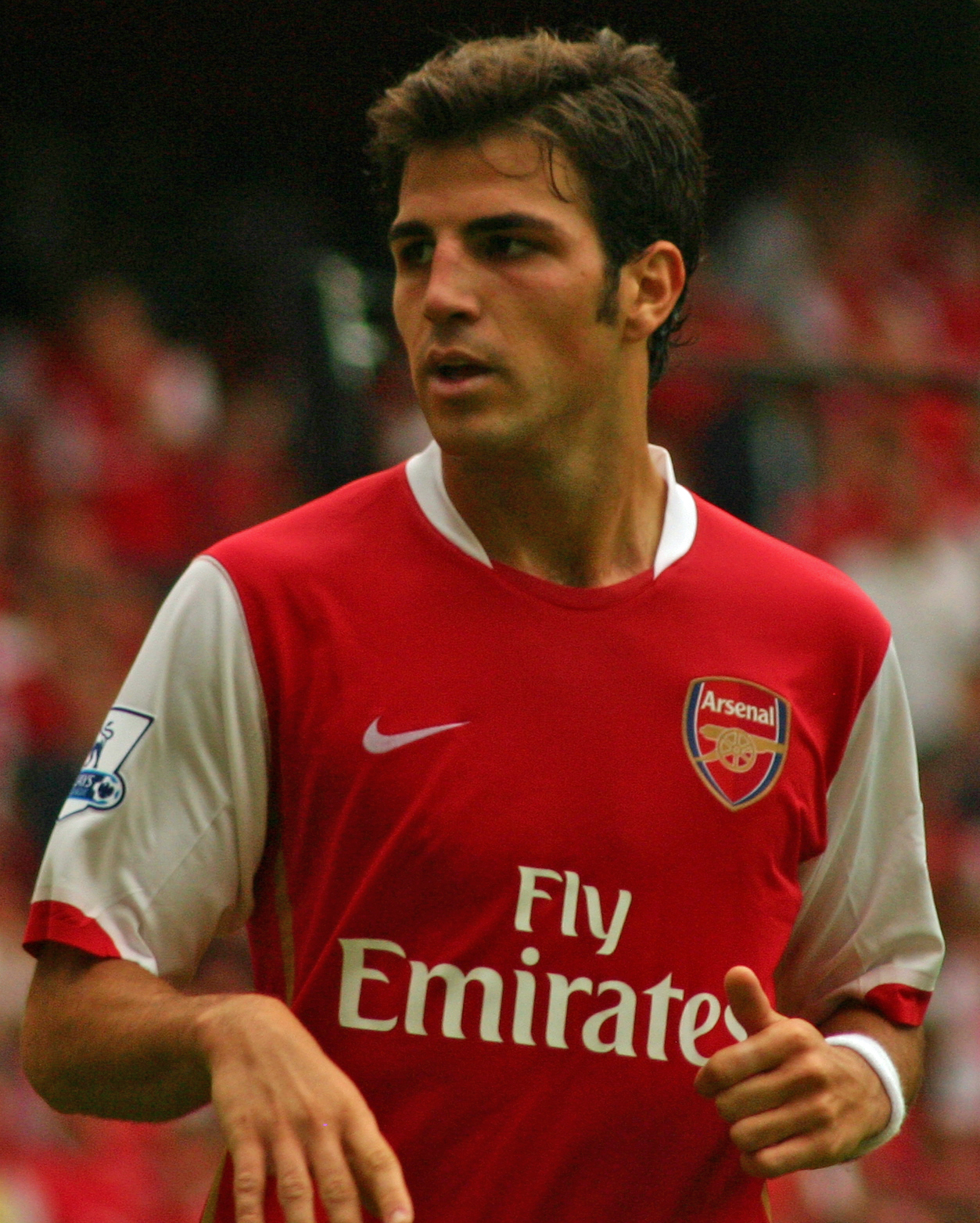
Fàbregas playing for Arsenal in August 2007

The 2006–07 season was a learning experience for the young Arsenal squad and Fàbregas. The club again failed to secure any major honours and were defeated by city rivals Chelsea in the League Cup Final. Fàbregas, however, emerged as one of the key creative players for the team, playing in every single league game. He kick-started Arsenal's 2006–07 UEFA Champions League campaign when he scored a brace in a 3–0 win over Dinamo Zagreb in a qualifier match. In the Premier League, he notched up 13 assists, which was the second-highest total in the league. He ended the season with several individual honours, including the Golden Boy award, presented by the Italian paper TuttoSport, based on a poll of leading writers across Europe. He was also named in the 2006 UEFA Team of the Year, and named FA Premier League Player of the Month for January 2007. Additionally, he was nominated for both PFA Players' Player of the Year and PFA Young Player of the Year, although both awards went to Manchester United's Cristiano Ronaldo. In June 2007, he was named Arsenal's Player of the Season, taking in 60% of the votes.

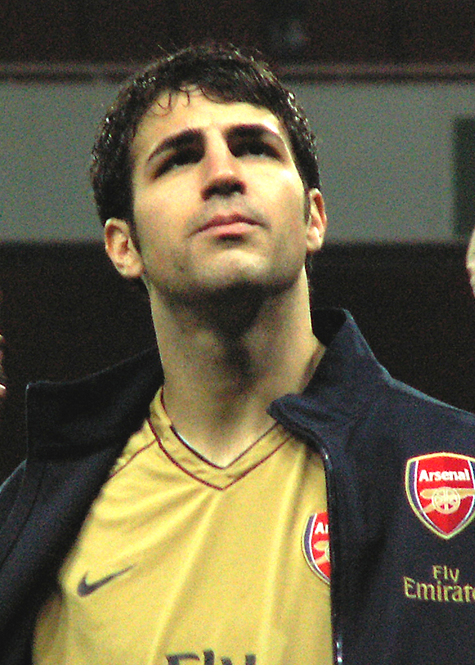
Fàbregas before a match against Newcastle United in January 2008

The 2007–08 season began with much uncertainty for Arsenal. First, David Dein, the club's vice-chairman, left amidst allegations of internal strife, followed by the departure of the club's all-time top goalscorer and captain, Thierry Henry, who signed for Barcelona. There was also speculation over Wenger's future with the club. Fàbregas knew that he would become the most important player for Arsenal, but stated he was ready for the challenge. He started the season well, chalking up goals and assists, and website soccernet attributed the early success of Arsenal to the young Spaniard. His start to the season also earned him the O_{2} Player of the Month award from Arsenal fans for August, September and October, as well as the Premier League Player of the Month for September. With Arsenal leading the league table until March, Fàbregas was equally instrumental in the club's 2007–08 Champions League campaign; in the return leg against Milan, the midfielder scored late in the game to send Arsenal into the quarter-finals. Though Arsenal ended the season trophyless, Fàbregas amassed several personal awards. On 11 April 2008, Fàbregas was nominated for the PFA Player of the Year and PFA Young Player of the Year awards for the second year running; he was later crowned the winner of the latter, and named in the PFA Team of the Year. He was also named the 2007–08 Arsenal.com Player of the Season.

==== Captaincy ====
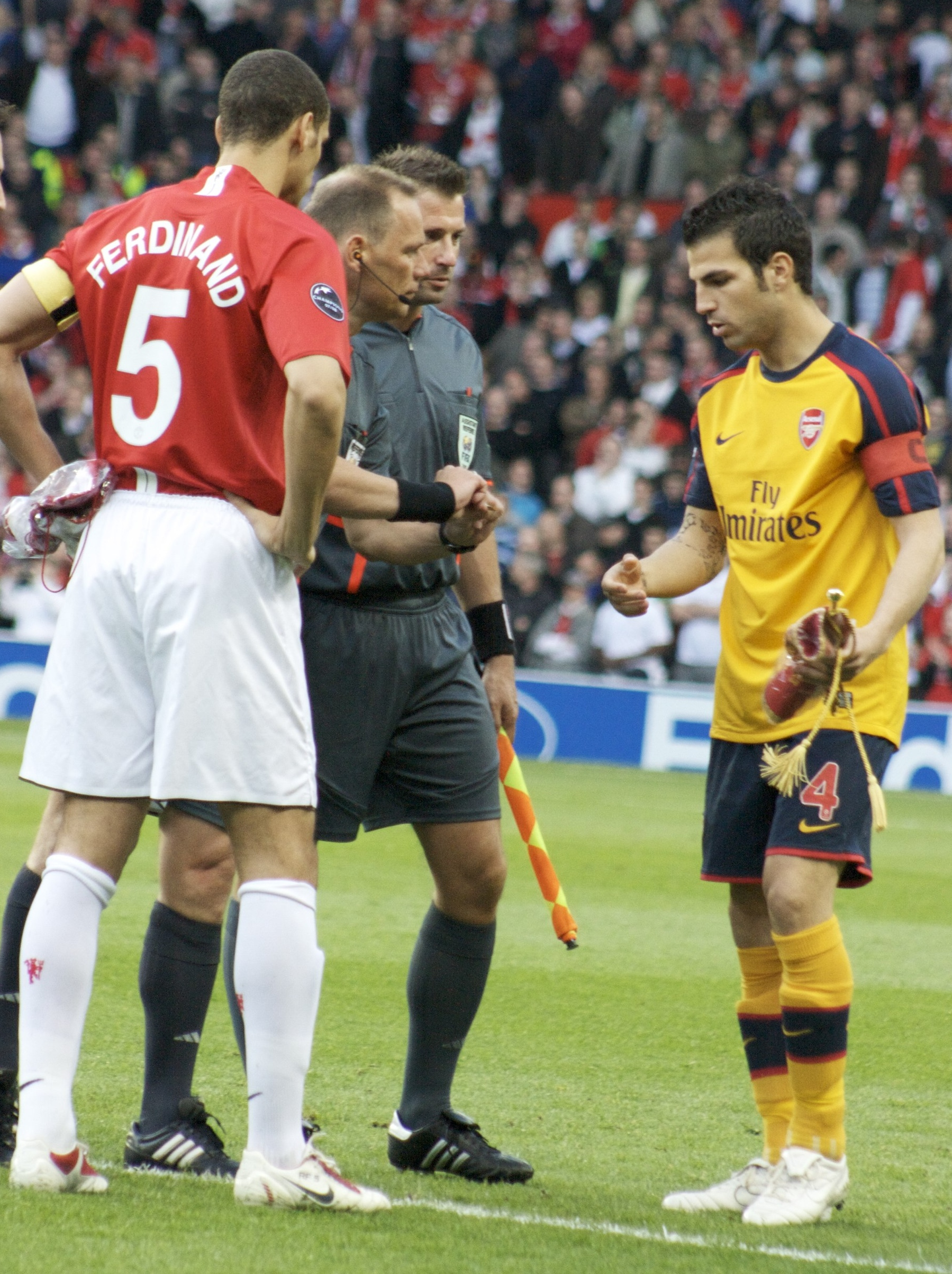
Fàbregas as captain during the 2008–09 Champions League semi-final

On 24 November 2008, 14 league games into the 2008–09 season, Fàbregas was named as the successor to William Gallas as club captain. However, just as Arsenal were getting back into the title race after a poor start to the season, the Spaniard was ruled out for four months after sustaining a knee injury against Liverpool. The Gunners eventually finished the season without any silverware, coming in fourth in the league and being knocked out at the semi-finals of the 2008–09 Champions League campaign.

In the opening league game of 2009–10 season, Fàbregas scored a brace and managed two assists in Arsenal's 6–1 away win against Everton. Arsenal went on to secure qualification for the 2009–10 Champions League campaign by beating Celtic over two legs, but their early momentum to the season was disrupted by consecutive league game losses to Manchester United and Manchester City. The team bounced back strongly after this setback, and with Fàbregas being prolific in scoring and setting up his teammates, it went unbeaten in the next 13 games. Despite suffering four league losses even before mid-season approached, Arsenal managed to lead the league standings after 22 games. On 31 March 2010, in the Champions League first leg of the quarter-final against Barcelona, Fàbregas suffered a leg fracture before scoring the equalising goal in the game which ended 2–2. Arsenal, who were four points behind league leaders Manchester United, were deprived of their captain for the remaining six league games of the season; they were subsequently eliminated by Barcelona in the Champions League, and fell out of the league title race. Fàbregas was later named to the PFA Team of the Year.

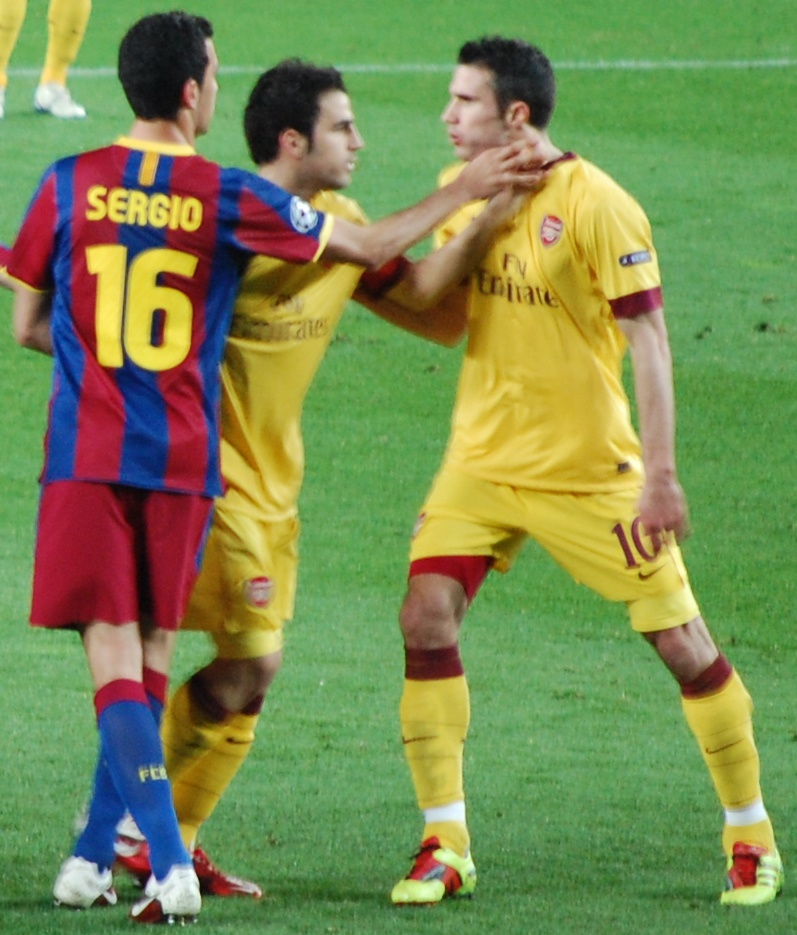
Fàbregas trying to subdue an argument between Sergio Busquets and Robin van Persie.

Before the start of the 2010–11 season, there was once again intense media speculation about the Spaniard's future, and in June 2010, a €35 million bid from Barcelona was rejected. The 2010–11 season turned out to be an extremely competitive one in the Premier League; even though Arsenal had lost five games before mid-season, they were jostling for pole position with Manchester United and Manchester City. Going into late February, Arsenal were still in contention for the quadruple, but within a span of two weeks they lost in the League Cup final, were eliminated by Barcelona in the Round of 16 of the Champions League, and defeated in the FA Cup quarter-final.

=== Barcelona ===
==== 2011–12 season ====
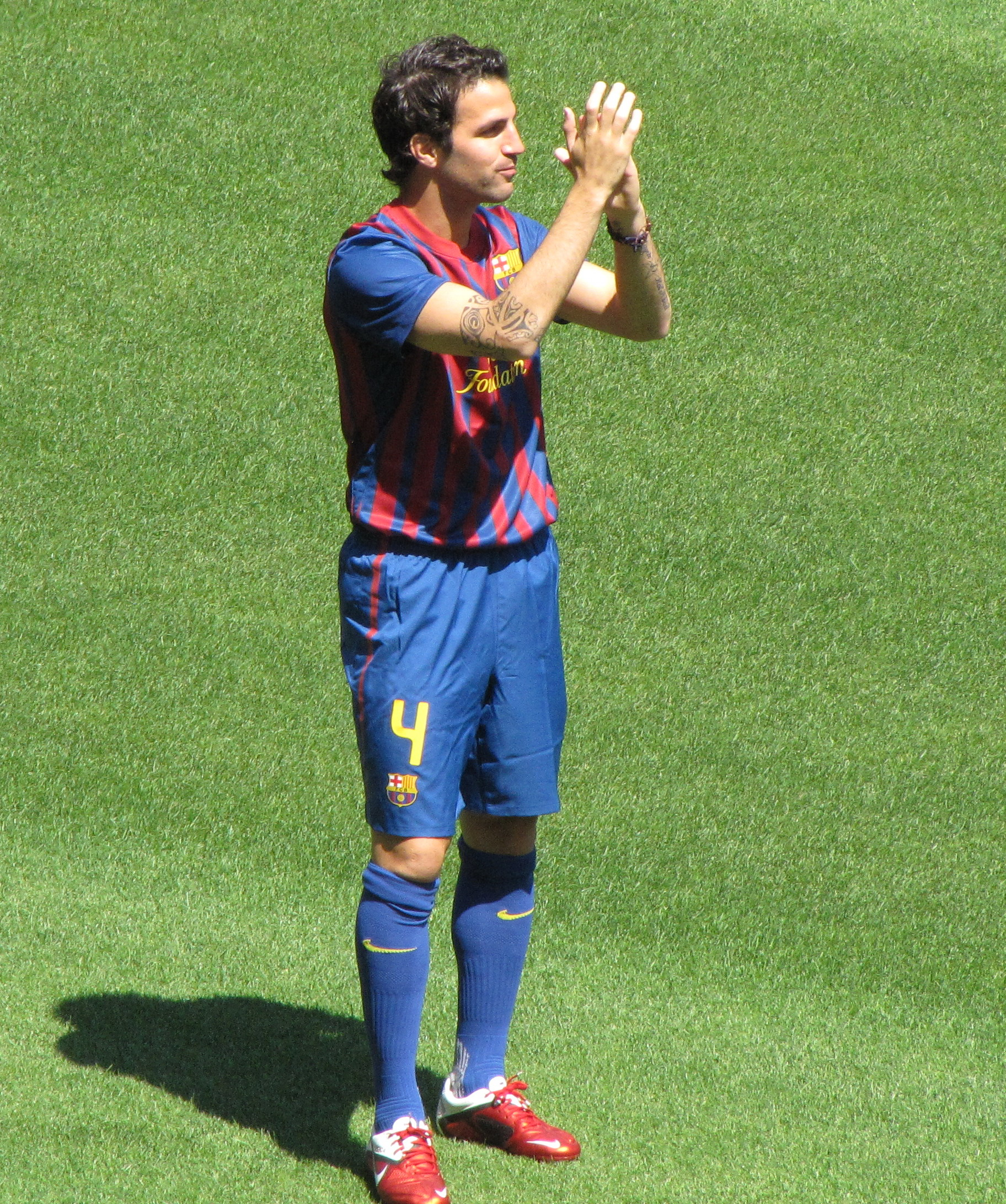
Fàbregas during his presentation at Barcelona in August 2011

On 15 August 2011, Barcelona signed Fàbregas for an initial fee of €29 million with a further €5 million in variables, plus Fàbregas would pay Arsenal €1 million a year from his wage for five years, ending one of the most protracted transfer sagas in recent times. Statistics show that in the five years prior to Fàbregas's departure from Arsenal, Fàbregas created 466 goal-scoring chances, made 86 assists and scored 48 goals, all three statistics topping those of new teammates Xavi and Andrés Iniesta, despite both having made more appearances in the same period.

Fàbregas joined a team that had won three La Liga titles in a row and two Champions League titles in three years, and one that featured the likes of Lionel Messi, Xavi, Andrés Iniesta and David Villa. He made his debut in the second leg of the Supercopa de España, coming on as a substitute against Real Madrid. Fàbregas drew a red card in the 90+4th after being the target of a dangerous challenge from Marcelo. Barcelona won the tie 3–2 and 5–4 on aggregate. He scored his first goal in a 2–0 win against Porto as Barcelona won the 2011 UEFA Super Cup, and his first league goal on his league debut, a 5–0 home win over Villarreal. He went on to score three more league goals in the month of September, including a late equaliser in the 2–2 away draw to Valencia.

Fàbregas then spent the majority of October sidelined with a hamstring injury picked up on international duty. He made his return, and scored, in a 4–0 away victory to Viktoria Plzeň in the Champions League. He then made his league return in the 2–2 draw away to Athletic Bilbao, scoring a goal in the same match. Fàbregas then went on to score a brace in a 5–0 home victory against Levante before netting in a 3–1 away victory against Real Madrid. Fàbregas later scored against Brazilian club Santos to help Barcelona to a 4–0 victory in the 2011 FIFA Club World Cup final.

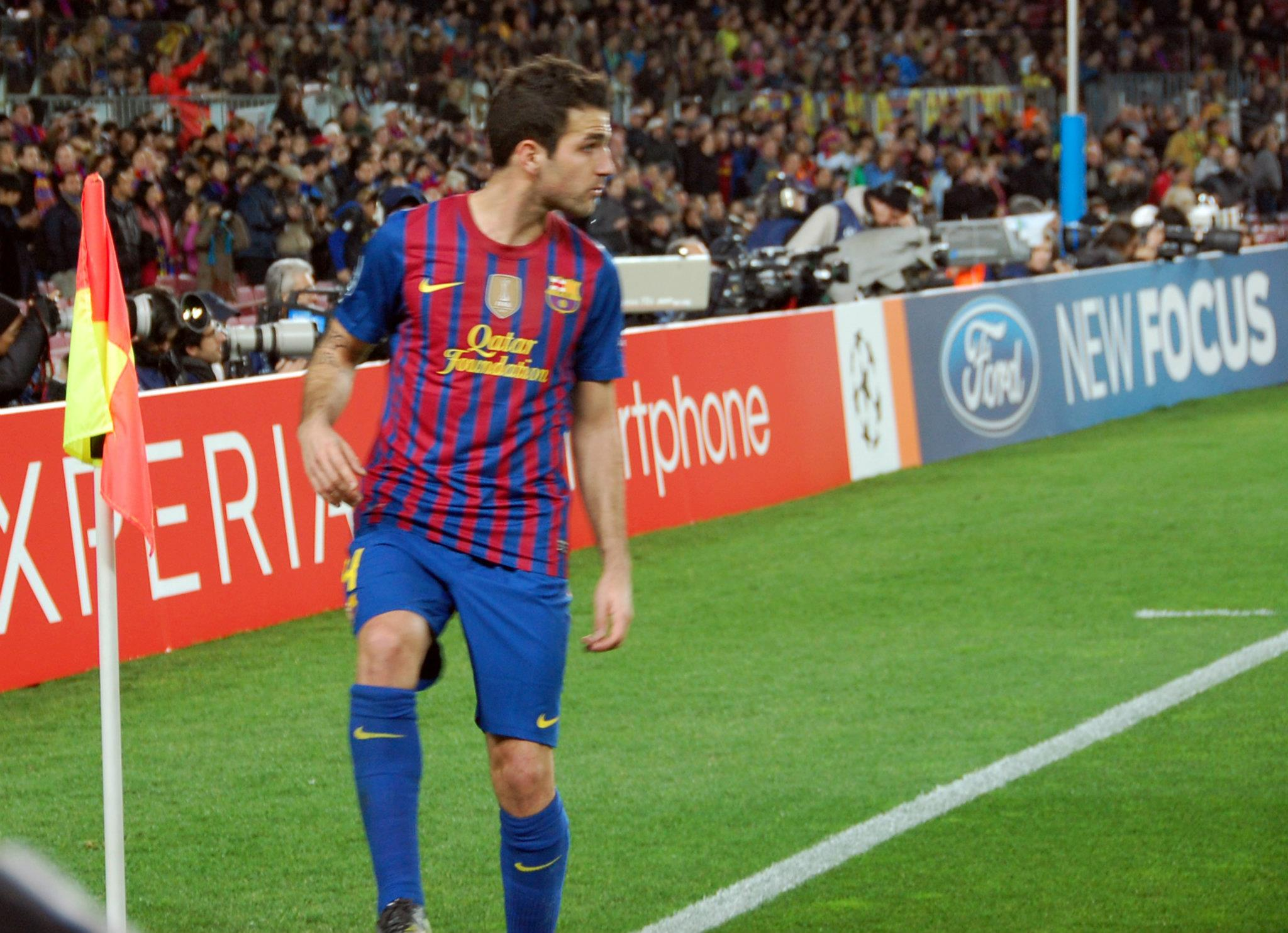
Fàbregas preparing to take a corner kick for Barcelona during a game against Bayer Leverkusen in March 2012

Fàbregas got another brace in a 4–0 victory against Osasuna in the Copa del Rey. He also scored in the semi-final of the competition against Valencia to help Barcelona to the final with a 3–1 win on aggregate. He kept a regular run in the Barcelona side for the rest of the season, including appearances in both semi-final legs of the 3–2 aggregate defeat to Chelsea in the Champions League, and a substitute appearance in the 3–0 victory against Athletic Bilbao in the Copa del Rey final.

Fàbregas ended his first season at Barcelona by winning the 2011–12 Copa del Rey, 2011 Supercopa de España, 2011 UEFA Super Cup and the 2011 FIFA Club World Cup, notching 15 goals and 20 assists in 48 appearances and four best midfielder awards.

==== 2012–13 season ====
Fàbregas ended his long goal drought for his club when he scored his first league goals of the season with a brace against Sevilla in a 3–2 away victory on 29 September. He then scored three goals in October, coming in the league, Champions League and the Copa del Rey. He scored again on 25 November in a 4–0 win away to Levante. On 13 January 2013, Fàbregas scored in a 3–1 win away to Málaga. Fàbregas scored his first hat-trick of his career against Mallorca in a 5–0 victory on 6 April 2013.

He ended his second season at Barcelona by winning the first league title of his career, with a record 100 points. Barcelona were eliminated, however, in the semi-finals of both the Copa del Rey, to rivals Real Madrid, and the Champions League, to winners Bayern Munich. Fàbregas ended the season with 14 goals and 12 assists in 48 appearances in all competitions.

==== 2013–14 season ====
Barcelona began the season by winning the Supercopa de España. In the opening game of the league season on 18 August, Fàbregas provided five assists in a 7–0 win over Levante. He scored 8 goals in 36 league matches, including braces in away wins over Granada on 10 November and Getafe on 22 December, the latter including a penalty kick. He also scored the only goal of the game on 1 October as Barcelona won away at Celtic in the group stage of the Champions League, heading in Alexis Sánchez's cross in the 73rd minute.

=== Chelsea ===
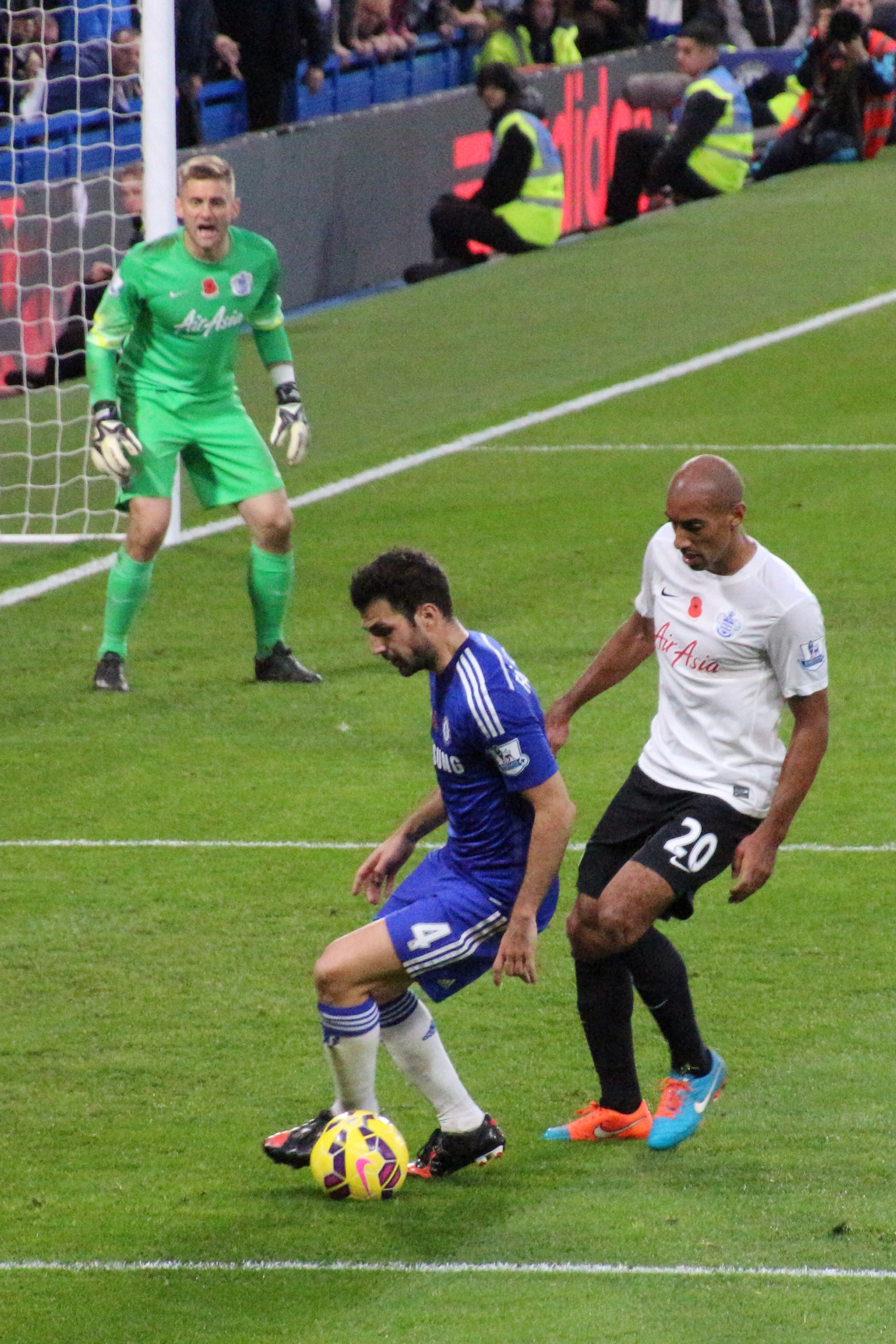
Fàbregas in action against Karl Henry of Queens Park Rangers in November 2014

On 12 June 2014, Premier League club Chelsea signed Fàbregas on a five-year contract for a fee in the region of €33 million. Following his transfer he took the number 4 shirt, previously worn by David Luiz. Fàbregas spoke of his transfer, saying, "I asked Barcelona to find a way for me to leave the club. The president tried to stop the sale, but I already had my mind made up." He went on to say, "If I didn't think that I'd be happy at Chelsea, I would've never made this decision. Above all, I want to be happy both professionally and personally."

==== 2014–15 season ====
Fàbregas made his competitive debut for Chelsea on 18 August as the team began their league season away to Burnley; he played the full 90 minutes of a 3–1 victory, providing two assists. He was a nominee for the Premier League Player of the Month in August 2014, with the accolade going instead to another new Chelsea signing, Diego Costa. On 13 September 2014, after providing two assists in Chelsea's 4–2 victory over Swansea City, Fàbregas became the first player ever in Premier League history to record at least one assist in six successive games; four under Chelsea and two under Arsenal during the 2010–11 season. Four days later, he scored his first goal for the club, opening a 1–1 draw at home against Schalke 04 in Chelsea's first match of the Champions League group stage.

His first league goal for Chelsea gave them a 2–1 win at Crystal Palace on 18 October, capping off a 19-pass move. Fàbregas also completed 123 passes, the most by any player on either side. On 10 December, with Chelsea already through to the knockout stage as group winners, Fàbregas scored an eighth-minute penalty to open a 3–1 Champions League victory over Sporting CP. Twelve days later he scored a second league goal, set up by Eden Hazard and concluding a 2–0 win away to Stoke.

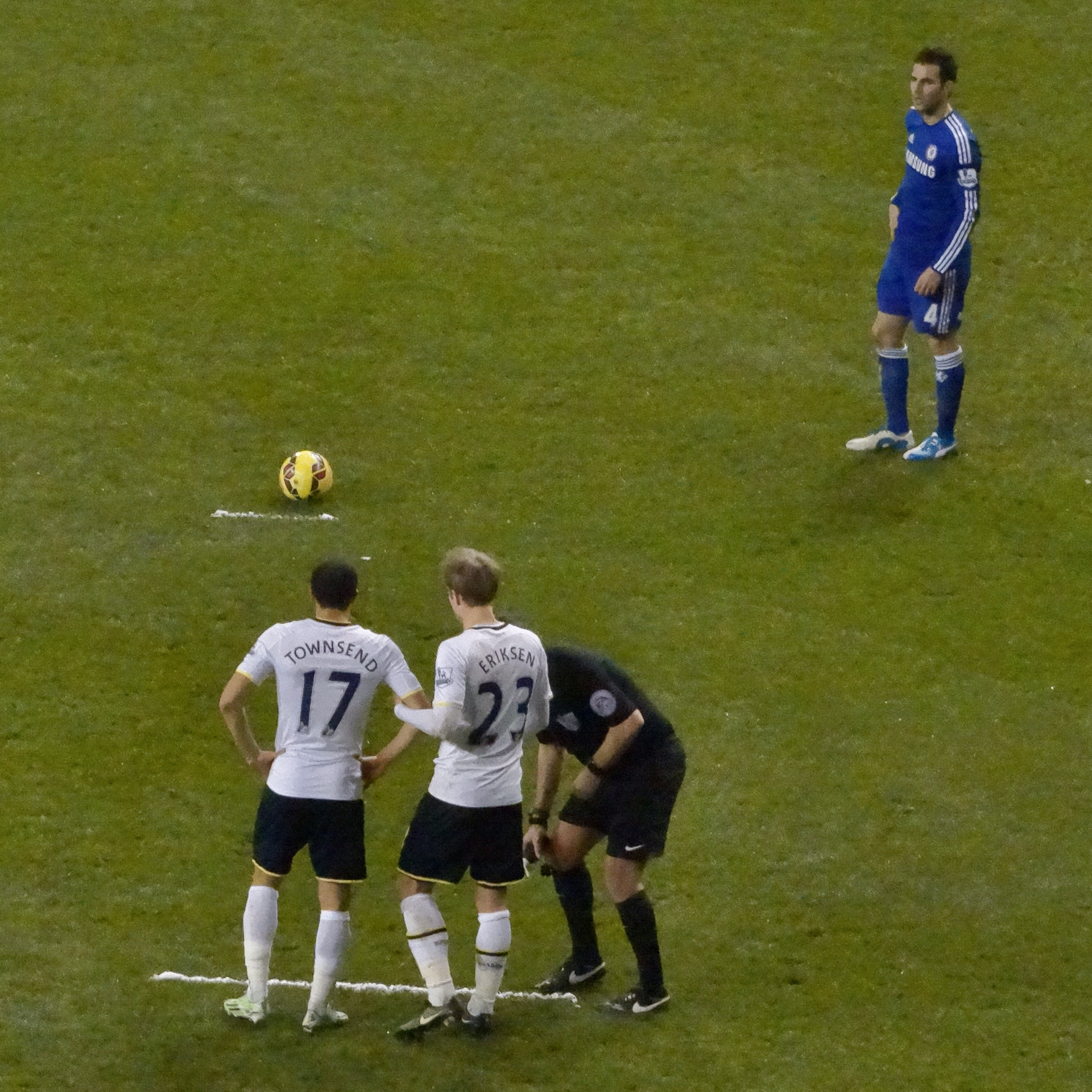
Fàbregas preparing to take a free kick against Tottenham in January 2015

Fàbregas was fitted with a protective mask after breaking his nose in a collision with Charlie Adam during the reverse fixture on 4 April. Eight days later, he scored the only goal of the game in the 88th minute in a victory over Queens Park Rangers at Loftus Road. On 3 May, the day before his 28th birthday, he won his first Premier League title at the ninth attempt, following a 1–0 home win over Crystal Palace. During the penultimate game of the season, away at The Hawthorns against West Bromwich Albion, Fàbregas was shown the red card and booed off by fans for deliberately kicking the ball at Chris Brunt's head while players were speaking to referee Mike Jones. On appeal, the suspension for this red card was cut from three matches to one.

==== 2015–16 season ====
Fàbregas scored his first goal of the season on 16 September, as Chelsea defeated Maccabi Tel Aviv 4–0 in the Champions League. He, Costa and Oscar were jeered by the crowd in December after the dismissal of Mourinho, with the supporters believing that the trio's conduct and poor performances were more culpable for the team's poor form. His first league goal came in a 3–3 home draw against Everton on 15 January 2016 and his second came in a 2–1 away win against Southampton on 27 February 2016. On 19 March 2016, Fàbregas scored a free-kick as well as a penalty in 2–2 home draw against local rivals West Ham United. Fàbregas scored Chelsea's last goal of the season after converting a penalty in the 1–1 draw against new Premier League champions, Leicester City.

==== 2016–17 season ====
Fàbregas was linked with a move away from London after he was an unused substitution in the 2016–17 Premier League opener against West Ham. On 20 August 2016, Fàbregas once again started on the bench against Watford, entering the match in the second half to replace Nemanja Matić and creating an assist for Diego Costa, who scored the winner in a 2–1 victory. In the post-match press conference, Fàbregas earned the praise of manager, Conte, for his inspiring performance in the comeback win as well as the attitude he shows during training sessions. Fàbregas's first two goals of the season came in an EFL Cup tie against Leicester City on 20 September, both coming within two minutes of each other in extra time to win the game 4–2, the victory moving Chelsea on to the Round of 16.

Fàbregas marking Troy Deeney and Richarlison in a game against Watford in October 2017

After a month long absence due to an injury, Fàbregas played a full 90 minute to for Chelsea u23 against Southampton u23 on 21 November 2016. During the match, he provided two assists to fellow first team player, Michy Batshuayi, and helped earn a 3–2 victory. Fàbregas saw his first league action since September in a game against Manchester City on 3 December 2016. Chelsea were trailing 1–0 when Fàbregas picked out Diego Costa with a long ball into the box. Costa brought the ball down and fired it into the net to equalise. Fàbregas came off the bench against West Bromwich Albion on 11 December 2016 and immediately made an impact on the deadlocked match, finding Diego Costa once again with a long ball that led to the winning goal. On 14 December 2016, Fàbregas led Chelsea to their tenth consecutive league victory with his first league goal of the season, scoring in the 40th minute against Sunderland. In his fifth league start of the season, on 31 December 2016, Fàbregas recorded his 100th Premier League assist in his 293rd appearance in Chelsea's 4–2 home victory over Stoke City; he became the fastest player in Premier League history to reach this landmark, taking 74 fewer appearances than Ryan Giggs.

On 4 February 2017, Fàbregas scored against former club Arsenal when he collected goalkeeper Petr Cech's poor clearance and chipped the ball back over him. He did not celebrate the goal out of respect to his former club. On 25 February, Fàbregas marked his 300th Premier League appearances with a goal and an assist as Chelsea defeated Swansea City 3–1. In the same match, he also reached 102 assists in the Premier League, equalling Frank Lampard as the league's second-highest provider of all time.

==== Subsequent seasons ====
In the 2017–18 season, Fàbregas made 49 appearances in all competitions, scoring three goals in a campaign which saw Chelsea win the FA Cup against Manchester United. He passed the ball to Eden Hazard who was fouled for a penalty, which the Belgian scored as the only goal of the game.

On 5 January 2019, Fàbregas played his final game in English football, a 2–0 home win over Nottingham Forest in the third round of the FA Cup. He took a penalty which was saved by Luke Steele. Fàbregas was in tears at the end of the game.

=== Monaco ===
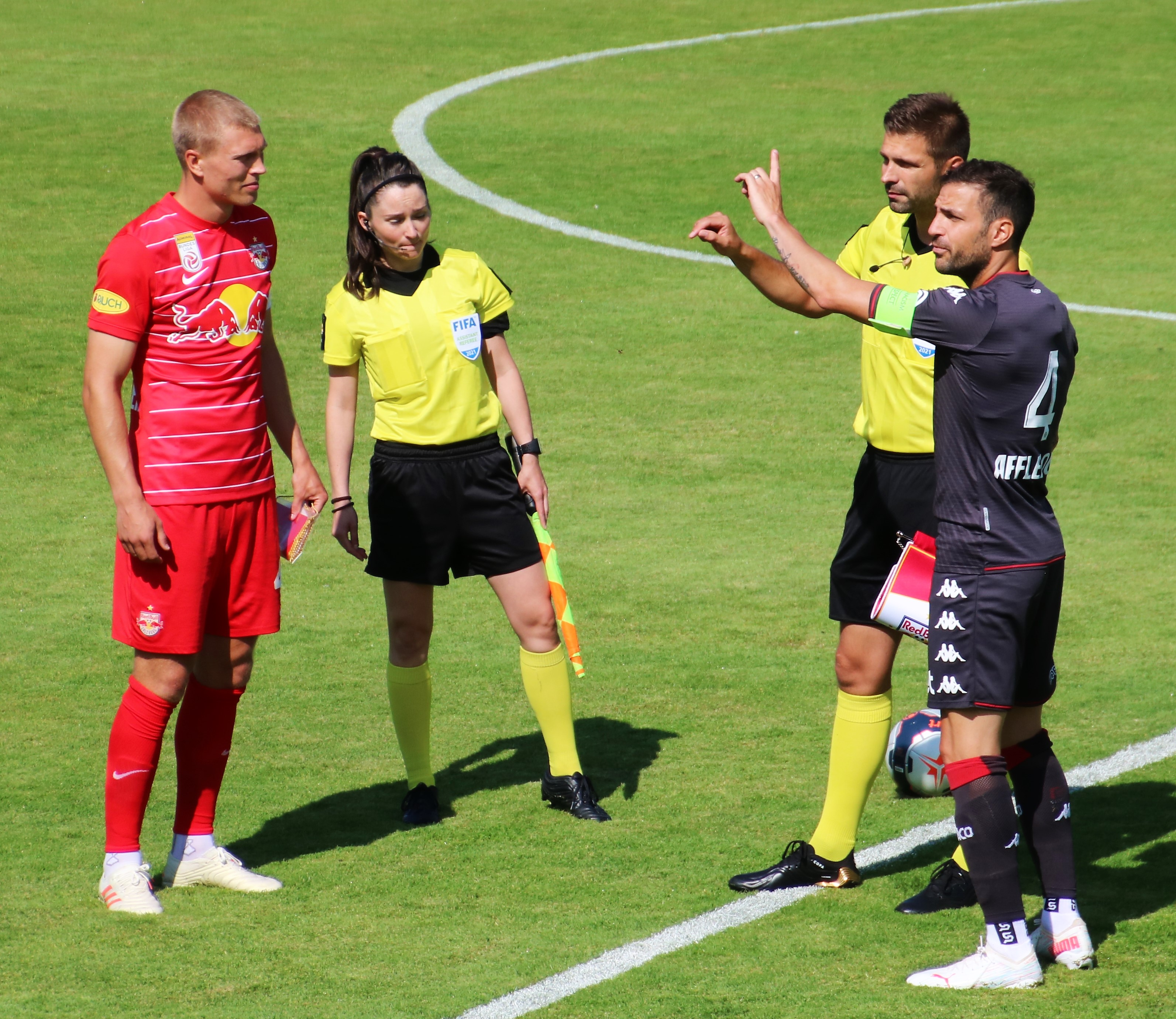
Fàbregas (furthest right, in black) playing for Monaco against Red Bull Salzburg in July 2021

On 11 January 2019, Fàbregas signed for Monaco on a deal until June 2022. He was signed by his former Arsenal teammate Thierry Henry, and there was no transfer fee, although Chelsea would receive payments related to his performances. He made his debut in Ligue 1 two days later a 1–1 draw against Marseille. On 2 February, he scored his first goal in a 2–1 win against Toulouse.

Fàbregas was sent off on the first day of the 2019–20 Ligue 1 season, in a 3–0 home loss to Lyon. His foul on Léo Dubois after 30 minutes was upgraded from a yellow to red card by VAR review. On 20 November 2020, Fàbregas scored the winning goal for Monaco in a 3–2 win over Paris Saint-Germain, which was their first win against PSG since August 2016. From December 2020 up to February 2021 he was injured in his left calf muscle.

In 2021–22, Fàbregas missed most of the season with a hamstring injury. He attempted a comeback for the reserve team on 22 April 2022 at home to Aubagne in the fourth-tier Championnat National 2, but was taken off after 40 minutes with an ankle complaint. Having totalled 36 minutes over two games of Ligue 1 football in his final season, he was released at the end of his contract in June 2022 but said that he would not retire.

=== Como and retirement ===
On 1 August 2022, Fàbregas was unveiled as a new player for Serie B club Como, signing a two-year contract. He made his debut 28 days later, playing the final 18 minutes as a substitute in a 1–0 home loss to Brescia.

Fàbregas announced his retirement from football on 1 July 2023.

== International career ==
=== Youth team ===
Although he features regularly for the Spain national football team, Fàbregas' international career began at youth level. At the 2003 FIFA U-17 World Championship held in Finland, he finished as top scorer of the tournament despite playing in midfield, and was voted Player of the Tournament. Spain finished runners-up in the tournament to Brazil. Fàbregas was next involved in the 2004 UEFA U-17 European Championship, where Spain also finished runners-up. He was named the Golden Player of the tournament by FIFA.

=== Senior team ===
In 2006, Fàbregas debuted for the Spanish senior squad in a friendly match against Ivory Coast. He became the youngest player capped for Spain in 70 years, beating Sergio Ramos' record. He received favourable reviews for his debut and was involved in the build-up to Spain's first goal in the 3–2 victory over the Ivorians.

==== 2006 World Cup ====
On 15 May 2006, Fàbregas was selected for the Spanish 2006 FIFA World Cup squad. During the tournament, he came on as a second-half substitute in Spain's first two group matches, contributing an assist to striker Fernando Torres in their 3–1 victory against Tunisia. He started alongside Spain's reserve players (including then-Arsenal teammate José Antonio Reyes) in Spain's third group match against Saudi Arabia. He earned a starting role in Spain's first knockout-stage match against France, in place of Marcos Senna, but Spain lost 3–1. Fàbregas also became the youngest player in Spanish football history to participate in a World Cup when he came on as a substitute for Luis García after 77 minutes in the 4–0 victory against Ukraine on 13 June 2006; he was then 19 years and 41 days old. He was later nominated for the Gillette Young Player of the World Cup, but Germany's Lukas Podolski won the award.

==== UEFA Euro 2008 ====
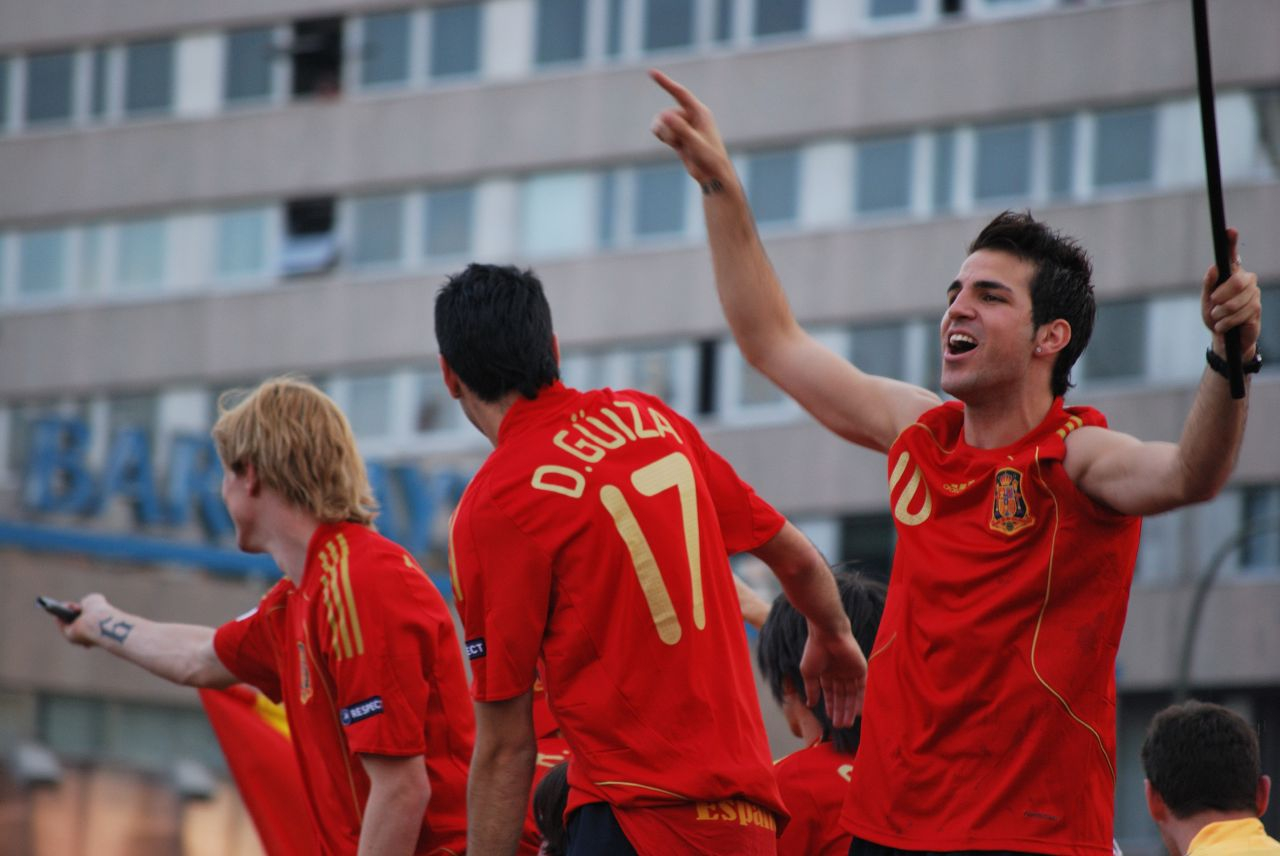
Fàbregas celebrating Spain's Euro 2008 championship

In UEFA Euro 2008, Fàbregas was handed the squad number 10, rather than 18 which he had previously held. Despite featuring mostly as a substitute, the midfielder made a considerable impact in Spain's campaign. He scored his first international goal in that competition in Spain's 4–1 win over Russia and also had an assist in that game. In the quarter-finals against Italy, Fàbregas scored the winning penalty in the penalty shoot-out after the teams remained deadlocked 0–0 after extra time. In the semi-finals, Spain defeated Russia 3–0 with Fàbregas providing two assists. The midfielder made the starting eleven in the Final against Germany where Spain prevailed 1–0, which was Spain's first major title since 1964. For his efforts, Fàbregas was named in the Team of the Tournament, a 23-man squad selected by the UEFA Technical Team.

==== 2009 Confederations Cup ====
After missing out for several months due to his injury, Fàbregas regained his place as a regular in Vicente del Bosque's squad. In June, he was named in the team for the 2009 FIFA Confederations Cup. He scored his second international goal in a 5–0 win against New Zealand in the competition's group stage. In the semi-finals against the United States, which Fàbregas started, Spain suffered a shock 2–0 loss, and its 15-game winning streak came to an end.

==== 2010 World Cup ====
Fàbregas was selected as a part of del Bosque's 23-man squad for the 2010 FIFA World Cup. With del Bosque preferring a starting midfield of Sergio Busquets, Xabi Alonso, Xavi and Andrés Iniesta, Fàbregas did not start in any of Spain's games in the competition. He featured as a substitute in four of their seven matches, in which Spain lost their opening game against Switzerland before winning the next six en route to the final. In the final against the Netherlands, Fàbregas set up the extra-time winner for Iniesta to win Spain the World Cup for the first time in their history.

==== UEFA Euro 2012 ====
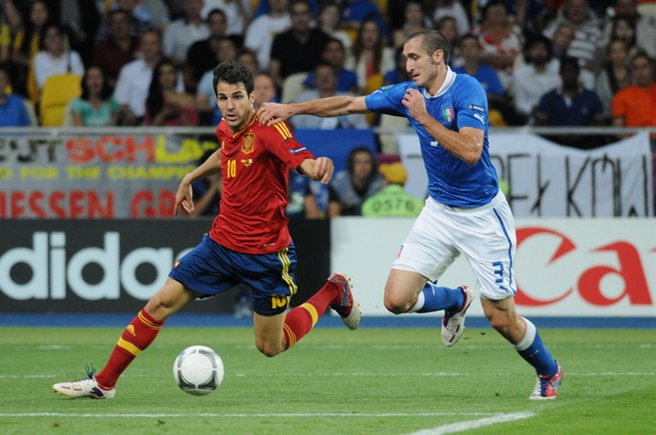
Fàbregas during the UEFA Euro 2012 Final

Fàbregas was selected as a part of del Bosque's 23-man squad for UEFA Euro 2012. Fàbregas started in the centre of the front three of a 4–3–3 formation against Italy in Spain's opening Group C match, essentially acting as a false 9. In the 64th minute he scored the equaliser after Italy had taken the lead in the 61st minute; the game finished in a 1–1 draw. He then scored his second goal of the tournament in the next group stage match against Ireland, which ended in a 4–0 win to Spain. When Spain faced Portugal in the semi-finals and the game remained scoreless at the end of extra time, Fàbregas scored the winning penalty of the shootout as Spain prevailed 4–2. In the final against Italy, Fàbregas started and provided the assist to David Silva for the game's opening goal, en route to a 4–0 Spain victory.

==== 2013 Confederations Cup ====
Fàbregas was named in the provisional squad in the lead up to the 2013 Confederations Cup by del Bosque. He made two starts in the competition and one substitute appearance, all during the group stage of the competition, and assisting a goal in Spain's opening group match against Uruguay, which Spain won 2–1. Spain won all their group matches, only conceding a goal and scoring 15. Spain advanced to the final of the competition for the first time, after a lengthy and difficult semi-final clash in a re-match against their opponents of the European Championship Final of the previous year, Italy. The match ended 0–0 after extra time and Spain won 7–6 in the resulting penalty shoot-out, but were eventually defeated 3–0 in the final by hosts and defending champions Brazil.

==== 2014 World Cup ====
Fàbregas was named in Spain's 30-man provisional squad for the World Cup, and was also included in the final list for the tournament. He made his debut in the tournament in the opening 1–5 defeat to the Netherlands, replacing David Silva for the last 12 minutes. With Spain already eliminated, he played 22 minutes of 3–0 win against Australia in the last group game, this time in place of Santi Cazorla.

==== UEFA Euro 2016 ====
On 31 March 2015, Fàbregas captained Spain for the first time, in their 0–2 friendly defeat to the Netherlands at the Amsterdam Arena. He earned his 100th cap on 12 October 2015, becoming the tenth Spaniard to do so, in a UEFA Euro 2016 qualifying match against Ukraine with Spain already qualified. In his milestone match at the Olympic Stadium in Kyiv, he won a first-half penalty when fouled by Oleksandr Kucher, but his spot kick was saved by Andriy Pyatov. He started all of Spain's matches at the finals, coming as a substitute in each of the three group games and playing the entirety of the defeat by Italy in the Round of 16 which ended their participation.

==== 2018 World Cup ====
Fàbregas was not selected for the Spain squad for the 2018 FIFA World Cup (his Chelsea colleagues Pedro, Álvaro Morata and Marcos Alonso were also overlooked after the club's disappointing season); he instead joined the BBC as a studio analyst for the tournament.

== Managerial career ==
=== Como ===
==== Youth coach, interim and assistant manager ====
On 1 July 2023, Fàbregas was appointed as head coach of Como's under-19 and B-teams following his retirement from professional football. He obtained his UEFA A coaching licence in 2023.

Following the dismissal of Moreno Longo on 13 November 2023, Fàbregas was promoted to first-team head coach on an interim basis. As he had no UEFA Pro coaching licence at the time of his appointment, he was handed a special dispensation to fill in as head coach for one month. On 20 December, Como announced the appointment of Osian Roberts as the new caretaker manager until the end of season, while Fàbregas would stay on as an assistant to the first team coaching staff. During his six matches as interim coach, Fàbregas recorded three wins, two draws and one loss, taking the team from seventh to third position in the Serie B table. The last match of his interim spell was a 3–3 home draw against Palermo on 23 December, with I Lariani scoring an equalising goal in the second minute of stoppage time to remain a point ahead of their promotion rivals.

On 10 May 2024, Como gained automatic promotion to Serie A, after finishing second in Serie B.

==== Manager ====
On 19 July 2024, just days after being admitted to the UEFA Pro coaching course organised yearly in Coverciano by the Italian Football Federation, Fàbregas was formally appointed in charge of Como, signing a four-year contract as head coach.

Fàbregas's debut as the permanent manager of Como on 11 August 2024 was a 1–1 draw away to Sampdoria in the first round of the Coppa Italia, a tie that the Lariani lost via a penalty shootout. Eight days later, in the team's first match of the Serie A season, Como lost 3–0 away to Juventus. Fàbregas would achieve his first win in charge of Como on matchday 5 of the season after beating Europa League winners Atalanta 3–2 away from home.

After a 1–0 home win over Genoa Fàbregas equalled Como's record run of four consecutive Serie A wins. Six days later Fàbregas led Como to their fifth win in a row after beating Parma 1–0 away from home, following it up with a 3–1 win over Cagliari to make it six wins in a row for Como. The six match winning run ended after a 1–1 draw with Hellas Verona on the penultimate matchday of the season, a result which confirmed Como would finish tenth in Serie A, their best finish since they finished ninth in 1987.

On 19 October 2025, Fàbregas coached Como to their first win over Juventus since 1952, defeating the 36-time champions 2–0 at the Stadio Giuseppe Sinigaglia. At the halfway point of the 2025–26 season, Como were in sixth place in the Serie A table with an unbeaten record in home matches. Following a strong run of form during the second half of the campaign, Como secured European qualification for the first time in the club's history. He ultimately guided the club to a last day fourth-place finish in Serie A, overcoming A.C. Milan in the ranking and securing qualification for the UEFA Champions League.

== Style of play ==
=== Arsenal ===
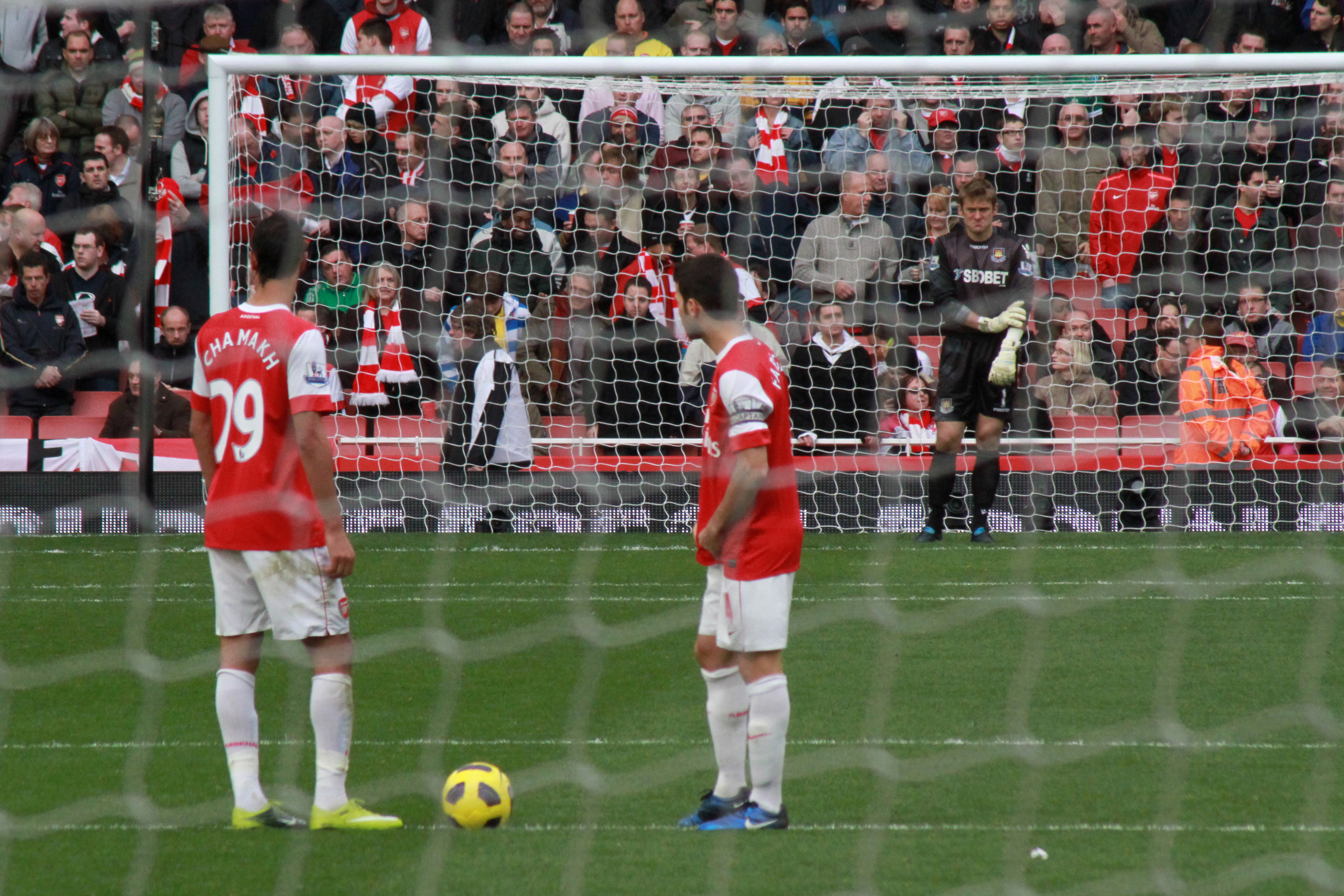
Fàbregas and Marouane Chamakh preparing to kick off in 2010. Fàbregas was a regular set-piece taker for Arsenal.

Originally brought to Arsenal as a youth to slowly develop via the League Cup, Fàbregas was unexpectedly deployed as Arsenal's starting central midfielder following a midfield injury crisis during the 2004–05 season. At the time, defensive midfielder Vieira served as his role model and mentor, and he styled his game after his childhood hero and compatriot Pep Guardiola, whose shirt number 4 he would inherit in his subsequent move to Barcelona in 2011. Because he was of a different mould from his Arsenal predecessors who played in the same position, this led to criticisms of his lightweight frame and less aggressive style of play, due to his development in the Barcelona Youth Academy, with former teammate Ashley Cole criticising the Spaniard as "an unproven featherweight" in his autobiography.

However, it did not take long for Fàbregas to become one of the most coveted and celebrated young talents in the game with his success at Arsenal. Functioning mostly as a playmaker and renowned for his passing range, he was described as the general of Arsenal's first team, bringing vision, creativity, and an innate understanding of timing and space to Arsenal's intricate passing game, displaying maturity that belied his age. He was the main creative force when he was at Arsenal, as exemplified by his 16 assists in all competitions in the 2006–07 season. Between 2006–07 and 2010–11, Fàbregas created the most chances in the top-division leagues of England, Spain, Italy, Germany and France.

Fàbregas quickly started assuming responsibility for set pieces, taking corners, free kicks and penalties. After the 2007–08 season, Fàbregas began maturing as a goalscorer, scoring 11 goals in his first 16 games, prompting Arsene Wenger to compare the Spaniard to Michel Platini. Through his career at Arsenal, Fàbregas played as a central midfielder in a two-man midfield pivot (usually next to a more defensive player like Edu, Patrick Vieira, Gilberto Silva, Mathieu Flamini or Abou Diaby), a box-to-box 'number 8' in a three-man midfield, and later as a 'number 10' in his prime.

=== Barcelona and Spain ===
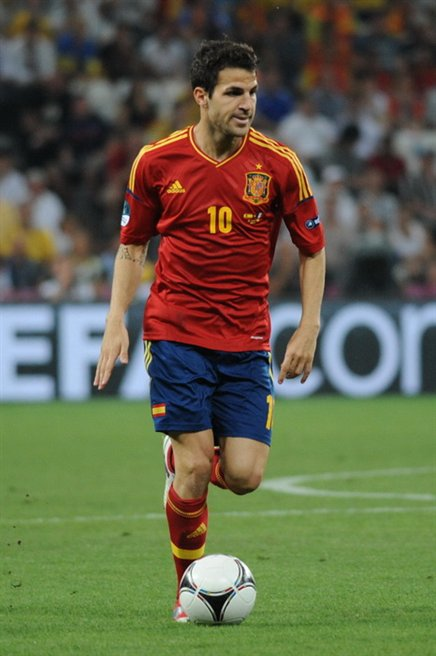
Fàbregas playing for Spain at UEFA Euro 2012

At Barcelona, Fàbregas continued to play a prominent midfield and playmaking role, although he was moved into a less talismanic role than that which he had occupied at Arsenal. His new surroundings at Barcelona were comparable with what he had played with the Spanish national team. In Pep Guardiola's 4–3–3 formation, he was suggested to be a good profile fit for the trademark patient, attacking, "tiki-taka" build-up style of play, also associated in the international setup under Luis Aragonés and Vicente del Bosque. Fàbregas was used in a variety of different roles under Guardiola. Due to the presence of Xavi, Sergio Busquets and Andrés Iniesta in the three-man midfield, as well as the emerging Thiago, Fàbregas was often employed as a supporting forward, or even out of position as a winger under Guardiola. He regularly performed in the role that Lionel Messi had occupied during the previous season, functioning as a false-9 in a 4–6–0 formation (a role which he would also regularly play for Spain at Euro 2012 under Del Bosque), whilst Messi would play as a right winger or second forward. Fàbregas was used in deeper roles on occasion, as an attacking, deep-lying or central playmaking midfielder, in particular under Guardiola's immediate successors, Tito Vilanova and Gerardo Martino. While Fàbregas' time at Barcelona was deemed to be successful, critics argued that there was a sense that he was not used to his maximum ability as at Arsenal and 'shoe-horned' under Guardiola rather than given a consistent midfield berth like Iniesta or Xavi, an admission that Fàbregas himself acknowledged.

=== Chelsea ===
Upon returning to England, Fàbregas moved back to playing a playmaking role in midfield, using his technique, ball control and vision to dictate the tempo of play. He was often supported by defensive midfielders in order to give him more space and time on the ball due to his then-deteriorating pace & athleticism. In this deeper creative position, although playing in a significantly less dynamic role than at Arsenal or Barcelona, he still excelled in Mourinho's system, where he proved to be an effective assist-provider. In his penultimate seasons at Chelsea, Fàbregas was given a more limited role - often coming off the bench in efforts to wrangle technical control of the midfield or to provide further creative pressure against low blocks.

== Outside football ==
=== Personal life ===
Fàbregas married his long-time Lebanese girlfriend Daniella Semaan in May 2018. They have two daughters and a son, all born in the 2010s. In July 2013, Fàbregas won a court case over the marital home with Semaan's ex-husband.

In July 2019 he was banned from driving in the UK for six months after being caught speeding.

=== Sponsorship ===
In 2011, Fàbregas signed a sponsorship deal with German sportswear and equipment supplier, Puma. He appeared in an advert for the new Puma PowerCat 1.12 in September 2011 and was one of the flagship wearers of Puma's PowerCat range of football boots. When the PowerCat was succeeded by the evoPower, again Fàbregas was the forefront of Puma's marketing campaign. In January 2014, the brand launched a C4 evoPower boot, specifically designed for just Fàbregas to wear. In 2012, Fàbregas signed an endorsement deal with Soul Electronics to sport Ludacris' signature line of headphones.

=== Other projects ===
Fàbregas starred in his own one-time only television programme, called "The Cesc Fàbregas Show: Nike Live", that aired on 19 May 2008. The programme was sponsored by Nike and was shown on Sky Sports. The show featured Fàbregas in several sketches with then Arsenal teammates like Philippe Senderos and Nicklas Bendtner, as well as coach Arsène Wenger, Fàbregas' parents and Little Britain star Matt Lucas.

=== Punditry ===
For the 2018 World Cup, Fàbregas was a pundit for the BBC's coverage. He featured alongside Rio Ferdinand, Alan Shearer and Gary Lineker.

== Career statistics ==
=== Club ===
Appearances and goals by club, season and competition
Club	Season	League			National cup (Note: Includes FA Cup, Copa del Rey, Coupe de France)		League cup (Note: Includes Football League/EFL Cup, Coupe de la Ligue)		Europe		Other		Total	
Club	Season	Division	Apps	Goals	Apps	Goals	Apps	Goals	Apps	Goals	Apps	Goals	Apps	Goals
Arsenal	2003–04	Premier League	0	0	0	0	3	1	0	0	0	0	3	1
Arsenal	2004–05	Premier League	33	2	6	0	1	0	5 (Note: Appearances in UEFA Champions League)	1	1 (Note: Appearance in FA Community Shield)	0	46	3
Arsenal	2005–06	Premier League	35	3	0	0	1	0	13	1	1	1	50	5
Arsenal	2006–07	Premier League	38	2	2	0	4	0	10	2	—		54	4
Arsenal	2007–08	Premier League	32	7	1	0	2	0	10	6	—		45	13
Arsenal	2008–09	Premier League	22	3	1	0	0	0	10	0	—		33	3
Arsenal	2009–10	Premier League	27	15	1	0	0	0	8	4	—		36	19
Arsenal	2010–11	Premier League	25	3	3	2	3	1	5	3	—		36	9
Arsenal	Total		212	35	14	2	14	2	61	17	2	1	303	57
Barcelona	2011–12	La Liga	28	9	8	3	—		9	1	3 (Note: One appearance and one goal in UEFA Super Cup, one appearance in Supercopa de España, one appearance and one goal in FIFA Club World Cup)	2	48	15
Barcelona	2012–13	La Liga	32	11	7	2	—		8	1	1 (Note: Appearance(s) in Supercopa de España)	0	48	14
Barcelona	2013–14	La Liga	36	8	8	4	—		9	1	2	0	55	13
Barcelona	Total		96	28	23	9	—		26	3	6	2	151	42
Chelsea	2014–15	Premier League	34	3	1	0	4	0	8	2	—		47	5
Chelsea	2015–16	Premier League	37	5	4	0	0	0	7	1	1	0	49	6
Chelsea	2016–17	Premier League	29	5	6	0	2	2	—		—		37	7
Chelsea	2017–18	Premier League	32	2	4	0	4	0	8	1	1	0	49	3
Chelsea	2018–19	Premier League	6	0	1	0	3	1	5 (Note: Appearances in UEFA Europa League)	0	1	0	16	1
Chelsea	Total		138	15	16	0	13	3	28	4	3	0	198	22
Monaco	2018–19	Ligue 1	13	1	1	0	1	0	—		—		15	1
Monaco	2019–20	Ligue 1	18	0	2	0	2	0	—		—		22	0
Monaco	2020–21	Ligue 1	21	2	5	1	—		—		—		26	3
Monaco	2021–22	Ligue 1	2	0	0	0	—		3 (Note: Two appearances in UEFA Champions League, one appearance in UEFA Europa League)	0	—		5	0
Monaco	Total		54	3	8	1	3	0	3	0	—		68	4
Monaco B	2021–22	Championnat National 2	1	0	—		—		—		—		1	0
Como	2022–23	Serie B	17	0	0	0	—		—		—		17	0
Career total			518	81	61	12	30	5	118	24	11	3	738	125

=== International ===
Appearances and goals by national team and year
National team	Year	Apps	Goals
Spain	2006	14	0
Spain	2007	8	0
Spain	2008	15	1
Spain	2009	10	4
Spain	2010	11	1
Spain	2011	4	2
Spain	2012	13	3
Spain	2013	11	2
Spain	2014	8	0
Spain	2015	7	1
Spain	2016	9	1
Total		110	15

Scores and results list Spain's goal tally first, score column indicates score after each Fàbregas goal.

List of international goals scored by Cesc Fàbregas
No.	Date	Venue	Cap	Opponent	Score	Result	Competition
1	10 June 2008	Tivoli-Neu, Innsbruck, Austria	27	Russia	4–1	4–1	UEFA Euro 2008
2	14 June 2009	Royal Bafokeng Stadium, Phokeng, South Africa	39	New Zealand	4–0	5–0	2009 FIFA Confederations Cup
3	9 September 2009	Estadio Romano, Mérida, Spain	44	Estonia	1–0	3–0	2010 FIFA World Cup qualification
4	10 October 2009	Vazgen Sargsyan Republican Stadium, Yerevan, Armenia	45	Armenia	1–0	2–1	2010 FIFA World Cup qualification
5	18 November 2009	Ernst-Happel-Stadion, Vienna, Austria	47	Austria	1–1	5–1	Friendly
6	8 June 2010	Estadio de La Condomina, Murcia, Spain	50	Poland	4–0	6–0	Friendly
7	2 September 2011	AFG Arena, St. Gallen, Switzerland	59	Chile	2–2	3–2	Friendly
8	2 September 2011	AFG Arena, St. Gallen, Switzerland	59	Chile	3–2	3–2	Friendly
9	10 June 2012	Stadion Energa Gdańsk, Gdańsk, Poland	64	Italy	1–1	1–1	UEFA Euro 2012
10	14 June 2012	Stadion Energa Gdańsk, Gdańsk, Poland	65	Republic of Ireland	4–0	4–0	UEFA Euro 2012
11	15 August 2012	Juan Ramón Loubriel Stadium, Bayamón, Puerto Rico	70	Puerto Rico	2–0	2–1	Friendly
12	6 February 2013	Khalifa International Stadium, Doha, Qatar	76	Uruguay	1–0	3–1	Friendly
13	8 June 2013	Sun Life Stadium, Miami Gardens, United States	79	Haiti	2–0	2–1	Friendly
14	11 June 2015	Estadio Reino de León, Castile and León, Spain	96	Costa Rica	2–1	2–1	Friendly
15	1 June 2016	Red Bull Arena, Salzburg, Austria	105	South Korea	2–0	6–1	Friendly

== Managerial statistics ==
As of 21 November 2026

Team	From	To	Record							
Team	From	To	M	W	D	L	GF	GA	GD	Win %
Como (interim)	13 November 2023	23 December 2023	6	3	2	1	8	7	+1	50.00
Como	16 July 2024	present	99	47	26	26	166	104	+62	47.47
Total			105	50	28	27	174	111	+63	47.62

== Honours ==
=== Player ===
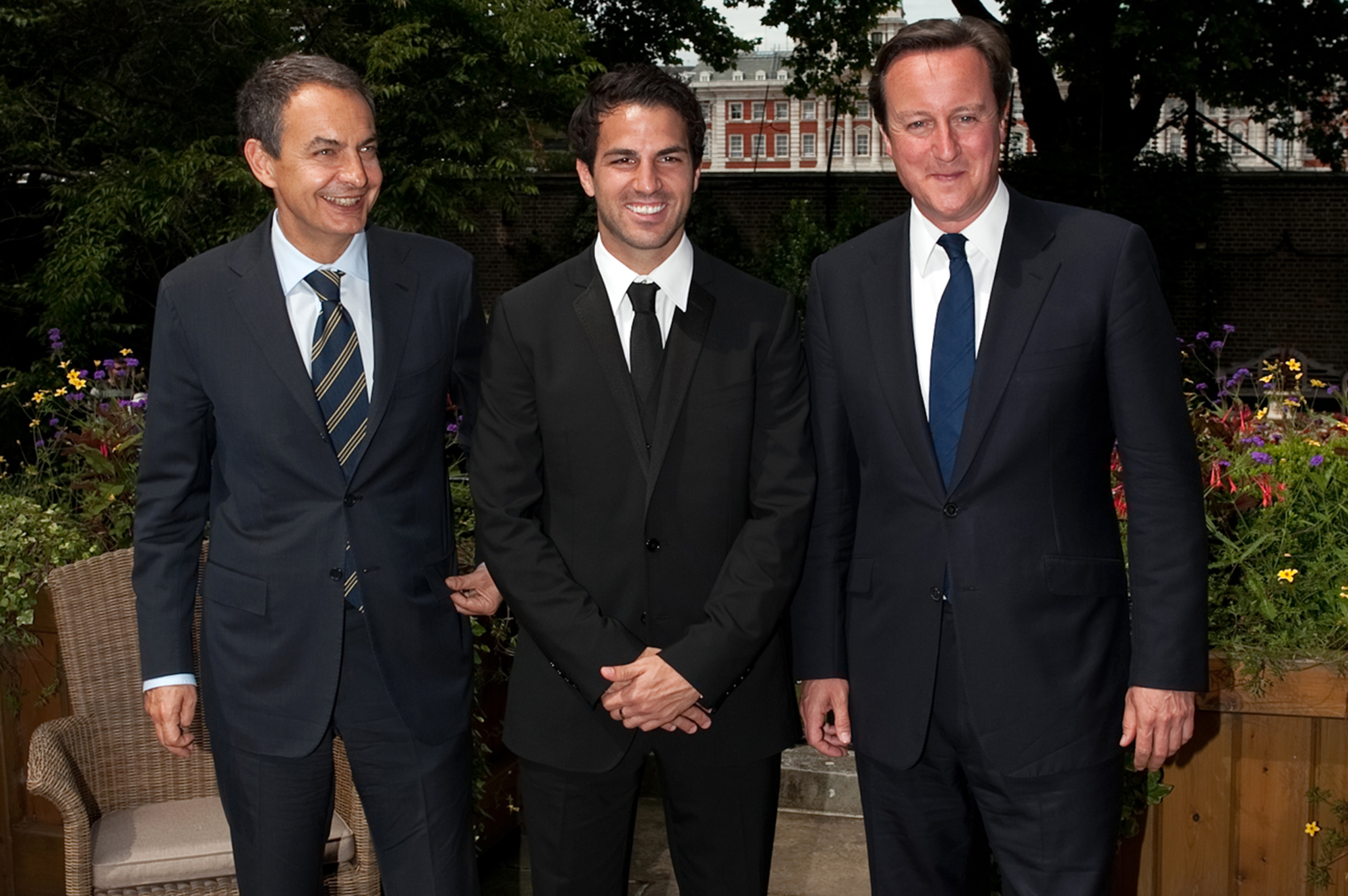
Fàbregas (centre) in 2011 with Spanish Prime Minister José Luis Rodríguez Zapatero (left) and British Prime Minister David Cameron

Arsenal

- FA Cup: 2004–05
- FA Community Shield: 2004
- Football League Cup runner-up: 2006–07
- UEFA Champions League runner-up: 2005–06

Barcelona

- La Liga: 2012–13
- Copa del Rey: 2011–12
- Supercopa de España: 2011, 2013
- UEFA Super Cup: 2011
- FIFA Club World Cup: 2011

Chelsea

- Premier League: 2014–15, 2016–17
- FA Cup: 2017–18; runner-up: 2016–17
- Football League Cup: 2014–15
- UEFA Europa League: 2018–19

Monaco

- Coupe de France runner-up: 2020–21

Spain

- FIFA World Cup: 2010
- UEFA European Championship: 2008, 2012

Individual

- FIFA U-17 World Championship Golden Ball: 2003
- FIFA U-17 World Championship Golden Shoe: 2003
- UEFA European Under-17 Football Championship Golden Player: 2004
- Bravo Award: 2006
- Golden Boy: 2006
- Ballon d'Or eighth: 2007, nominee: 2006, 2008, 2009, 2010, 2011
- UEFA Team of the Year: 2006, 2008
- Premier League Player of the Month: January 2007, September 2007
- Arsenal Player of the Season: 2006–07, 2009−10
- PFA Young Player of the Year: 2007–08
- PFA Team of the Year: 2007–08 Premier League, 2009–10 Premier League
- ESM Team of the Year: 2007–08, 2009–10, 2014–15
- UEFA European Championship Team of the Tournament: 2008, 2012
- FIFA FIFPro World XI 5th team: 2014

Orders

- Prince of Asturias Awards: 2010
- Gold Medal of the Royal Order of Sporting Merit: 2011

=== Manager ===
Individual

- Serie A Coach of the Month: April 2025, May 2025, March 2026
- Serie A Coach of the Year: 2026
- Enzo Bearzot Award: 2026

== See also ==
- List of footballers with 100 or more UEFA Champions League appearances
- List of men's footballers with 100 or more international caps

== Notes ==
Records began at the start of the 2006–07 season.
