= The Fighter and the Kid =

Talk show podcast

- Genre: Talk Show
- Format: Audio; Video
- Language: English

Creative team
- Created by: Brendan Schaub • Bryan Callen

Cast and voices
- Hosted by: Brendan Schaub • Bryan Callen

Production
- Length: 1–2 hours

Technical specifications
- Video format: YouTube
- Audio format: MP3; Spotify

Publication
- Original release: 2013
- Provider: Peter Schaub LLC

The Fighter and the Kid is a weekly podcast hosted by comedian Bryan Callen and former comedian and former professional UFC fighter Brendan Schaub. Each episode ranges from 1-2 hours in length.

== History ==
The podcast was co-founded in 2013 by Callen and Schaub. The podcast takes its name from Schaub being known as a fighter, while Callen is known in the LA stand-up comedy circuit by his nickname Bryan 'The Kid' Callen.

In August 2020, Bryan Callen announced a leave of absence from the podcast, after denying allegations of sexual assault or misconduct by four women. This came soon after news of sexual misconduct allegations made against Chris D'Elia, a frequent guest on the podcast. Callen eventually returned as a regular host during 2021. Previous regular guest co-hosts Malik Bazille and Shapel Lacey no longer feature regularly.

In May 2022, the show was the subject of widespread online controversy when comedian Bobby Lee alleged he had been subject to bullying, threats and harassment by co-hosts Schaub and Callen. In the following days, during The Fighter and The Kid episode 796, Callen provided a public apology.

== Content ==
Twice a week on Tuesdays and Thursdays, Schaub and Callen are joined in a casual talk setting by show producer Chin Yi.

Topics range widely, but common themes include Los Angeles, current affairs, and Schaub's personal life.

The podcast is performed prerecorded, and published both on video via YouTube and in audio form across a number of platforms including Spotify. The show is produced by Chin S Yi and published by Thiccc Boy Productions Inc, a Colorado registered business.

== Online subculture ==
The podcast's online community have formed a subculture where viewers mock Schaub's patterns of speech by speaking "Schaubanese", referring to themselves as "homeless cats", and role-playing as fry cooks at P.F. Chang's. These are references to Schaub saying that he valued a negative opinion from someone the same way he viewed a homeless person's or a cat's opinion on his work, and Schaub's disparaging comments about P.F. Chang's employees.

The podcast's online forum on Reddit has over 165,000 members as of September 2024. While initially a fan forum, opinion towards the show has turned negative. The forum is also known as "P.F. Chang's", or simply as Chang's, a reference to the restaurant chain.
