= Bryan Callen =

American stand-up comedian, actor, writer and podcaster (born 1967)

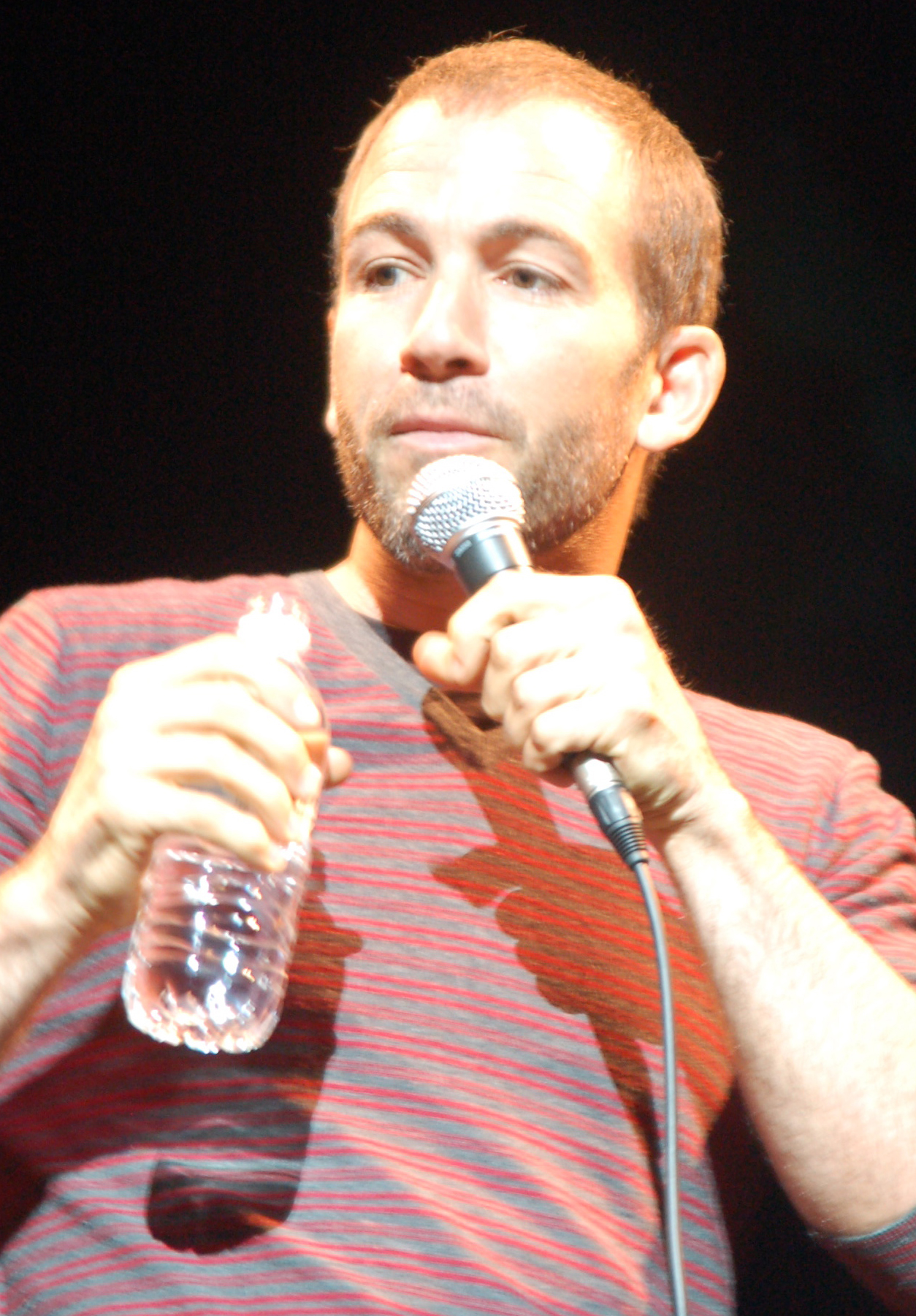
- Callen in April 2011
- Born: Bryan Christopher Callen; January 26, 1967 (age 59); Manila, Philippines
- Citizenship: United States; Philippines (Note: US citizen via jus sanguinis, Philippine citizen via jus soli.)
- Education: American University
- Occupations: Actor; comedian; television personality; podcaster
- Years active: 1995–present
- Notable work: MADtv (1995 –2009); Adam Hills Tonight (2013–present); Schooled (2019–2020)
- Spouse: Amanda Humphrey (m. 2008; div. 2021)

Comedy career
- Medium: Stand-up; film; television
- Genres: Sketch comedy; Improvisational comedy

Bryan Christopher Callen (born January 26, 1967) is an American stand-up comedian, actor, writer and podcaster. He studied acting at the Beverly Hills Playhouse. Born on a military base in Philippines and some time later his family moved to Gill, Massachusetts, Callen initiated his career as one of the original cast members on the sketch comedy series MADtv. Callen played Coach Mellor in The Goldbergs and reprised the role as a main character in the Goldbergs spinoff series Schooled. He is also a co-host of The Fighter and the Kid podcast, alongside Brendan Schaub.

== Early life ==
Callen was born on a military base in Manila, Philippines. He is the son of American parents, Victoria Callen (née Sclafani) and Michael A. Callen. Because of his father's career as an international banker, Callen lived overseas until he was fourteen years old, including in the Philippines, India, Pakistan, Lebanon, Greece and Saudi Arabia. He graduated from Northfield Mount Hermon High School in Gill, Massachusetts in 1985. He then attended American University in Washington, D.C., where he graduated with a bachelor's degree in History. He is of Italian and Irish descent.

== Career ==
=== MADtv (1995–1997) and other television projects ===
Callen was one of the eight original cast members when MADtv debuted in 1995. Callen's characters included Pool Boy from Cabana Chat with Dixie Wetsworth, motivational speaker Al Casdy, and "relationship-challenged" death row inmate Jeremy Anderson. Callen also performed impressions of Bill Clinton, Robert De Niro, Al Gore, Luke Perry, Steven Seagal, Sammy Hagar, Kevin Bacon, Jim Carrey, Ted Knight and Arnold Schwarzenegger, among others.

Callen has guest starred on television series such as Entourage, NewsRadio, Oz, Frasier, Suddenly Susan, NYPD Blue, Law & Order: Special Victims Unit, CSI, 7th Heaven, Rude Awakening, Less than Perfect, The King of Queens, Sex and the City, Kingdom, Stacked, Las Vegas, Reba, Fat Actress, Californication and How I Met Your Mother.

Callen played Ricky's sexually abusive father on The Secret Life of the American Teenager on ABC Family. He also made frequent appearances on Chelsea Lately. He hosted the E! show Bank of Hollywood, and currently appears as a commentator of The Smoking Gun Presents: World's Dumbest... on truTV.

Callen also played the role of Coach Mellor in The Goldbergs and its spinoff series Schooled. The pilot aired on January 24, 2018. The spinoff was picked up for a 13-episode order for the fall, 2018 television season.

Callen co-wrote and co-starred in Dream Crushers with Will Sasso, Sara Rue, and Scott Thompson. The series was shot in 2009 but unaired until 2011. He appeared with Melinda Hill in an episode of the 2012–13 web series Romantic Encounters.

=== Ten Minute Podcast ===
Beginning on February 20, 2012, Callen and fellow actors and comedians Will Sasso and Chris D'Elia began the Ten Minute Podcast. Tommy Blacha and Chad Kultgen later replaced Callen and D'Elia.

=== The Fighter and the Kid ===
Callen currently cohosts a podcast titled The Fighter and the Kid with Brendan Schaub, and producers Chin and Nick. The podcast formerly focused on the realm of mixed martial arts, but since their departure from Fox Sports, they regularly discuss pop culture and current events as well.

Schaub and Callen performed the podcast live on a national tour in 2016. The tour included such venues as The Vic Theatre (Chicago), Gramercy Theatre (New York City), and Wilbur Theatre (Boston); culminating at the Comedy Store in Los Angeles.

In 2016 Schaub and Callen released The Fighter and the Kid 3D. The twelve episode digital download series features sketch comedy pieces based on the duo's podcast personas.

Schaub and Callen regularly appear alongside Joe Rogan during live event broadcasts, such as the UFC and Glory Kickboxing, for what is called the Fight Companion. They also appeared on the MTV show Ridiculousness, hosted by Rob Dyrdek, in June 2016.

In September 2023, Schaub and Callen publicly stated that Kast Media and its CEO Colin Thomson owed their production company $1.5-1.6 million dollars. Similar claims were made by Jim Cornette followed by Theo Von, Jason Ellis, Whitney Cummings, and Alyx Weiss, who stated they were owed money by Kast Media, including several six-figure and seven-figure shortages. This was in the process of an acquisition of Kast Media by PodcastOne, where Thomson was offering creators partial reimbursement combined with stock options. Amid the news, LiveOne and PodcastOne stock dropped considerably and the company no longer planned to officially hire Thomson. LiveOne took out a high-interest loan to pay Schaub and Callen, but did not compensate other creators.

=== Stand-up comedy ===
Callen headlines his solo stand up comedy act at venues across the United States. In early 2016 he released Never Grow Up which was recorded live at the Irvine Improv in April, 2015. Never Grow Up was released online in conjunction with The Fighter and the Kid 3D Web series. he released a special in 2019 called Complicated Apes. In 2022, he released his special “Man tears” on his YouTube channel. In October 2025, he released his special "FALSE GODS" on his YouTube channel.

=== Other ===
In March 2023, Callen and fellow comedian Nick DiPaolo and Josh Firestine joined Steven Crowder on his network, Mug Club, to stream on Rumble.

== Sexual misconduct allegations ==
On July 31, 2020, the Los Angeles Times reported that four women, including actress Kathryn Fiore, told the newspaper that Callen mistreated them and described incidents of sexual misconduct including rape, assault, and disturbing comments that date back to 1999. In a tweet, Callen denied the accusations. He also released a long form video on Instagram and YouTube vehemently denying all allegations.

Callen filed a lawsuit against Fiore and her husband, Gabriel Tigerman. In January 2021, Judge Monica Bachner ruled in the couple's favor, stating that Callen "did not meet his burden of demonstrating a probability of prevailing on his claim."

== Filmography ==
=== Comedy specials ===
Year	Title	Notes
2012	Man Class	Online
2016	Never Grow Up	Online
2019	Complicated Apes	Online
2022	Man Tears	Online
2025	FALSE GODS	Online

=== Film ===
Year	Title	Role	Notes
1995	Mail Bonding	Poet	
1998	Driven to Drink	Bartender	
2002	Live from Baghdad	American Hostage No. 2	
2003	Deliver Us from Eva	Theo Wilson	
2003	Bad Santa	Bar Owner	
2003	The Goldfish	Duncan Poole	
2003	Old School	Avi	
2005	D-WAR	Dr. Austin	
2006	Scary Movie 4	President's Aide	
2007	I Do & I Don't	Bob	
2008	Get Smart's Bruce and Lloyd: Out of Control	Howard	
2009	The Hangover	Eddie Palermos	
2009	The Goods: Live Hard, Sell Hard.	Jason Big Ups	
2010	The 41-Year-Old Virgin Who Knocked Up Sarah Marshall and Felt Superbad About It	Andy	
2011	The Hangover Part II	Samir	
2011	Warrior	Himself	
2011	Division III: Football's Finest	Denny Dawson	
2013	10 Rules for Sleeping Around	Owen Manners	
2014	Ride Along	Miggs	
2014	About Last Night	Trent	
2014	Planes: Fire & Rescue	Avalanche	Voice Cameo
2014	Walk of Shame	Dealer	
2014	My Man Is a Loser	Paul	
2016	Range 15	Guard Callen	
2019	Joker	Javier	
2019	No Safe Spaces	Himself	
2020	Think Like a Dog	Agent Callen	

=== Television ===
Year	Title	Role	Notes
1995–1997	MADtv	Various Characters	42 episodes
1998	NewsRadio	Russ Garrelli	1 episode
1998	Oz	Jonathan Coushaine	7 episodes
1999	Frasier	The Chicken	Episode: "Radio Wars"
2003	Law & Order: Special Victims Unit	Derrick Pfeiffer	Episode: "Risk"
2003	CSI: Crime Scene Investigation	Barry Yoder	Episode: "Last Laugh"
2003	Sex and the City	Howie Halberstein	Episode: "The Catch"
2004	The West Wing	Louis	Episode: "Disaster Relief"
2004	Significant Others	Bob	3 episodes
2004–2006	7th Heaven	George "Vic" Vickery	9 episodes
2005	Fat Actress	Eddie Falcone	7 episodes
2005	The King of Queens	Jared	Episode: "Like Hell"
2005	Reba	Buzzard	Episode: "Invasion"
2006–2009	How I Met Your Mother	Bilson	6 episodes
2006–2007	Entourage	Rob Rubino	2 episodes
2008–2014	World's Dumbest...	Himself	77 episodes
2009	The Secret Life of the American Teenager	Bob Underwood	2 episodes
2009–2010	Bank of Hollywood	Host	8 episodes
2010	CSI: Miami	Kent	Episode: "Getting Axed"
2010	I'm in the Band	Bleed	Episode: "Bleed Guitarist"
2011–2012	In Plain Sight	Mark	8 episodes
2011	Death Valley	Capt. Frank Dashell	12 episodes
2012	Californication	Cop	Episode: "The Ride Along"
2014–2017	Kingdom	Garo Kassabian	14 episodes
2014–2020	The Goldbergs	Coach Mellor	42 episodes
2016	2 Broke Girls	Tony	Episode: "And The Booth Babes"
2019–2020	Schooled	Coach Mellor	34 episodes
