= Chris D'Elia =

American actor, comedian (born 1980)

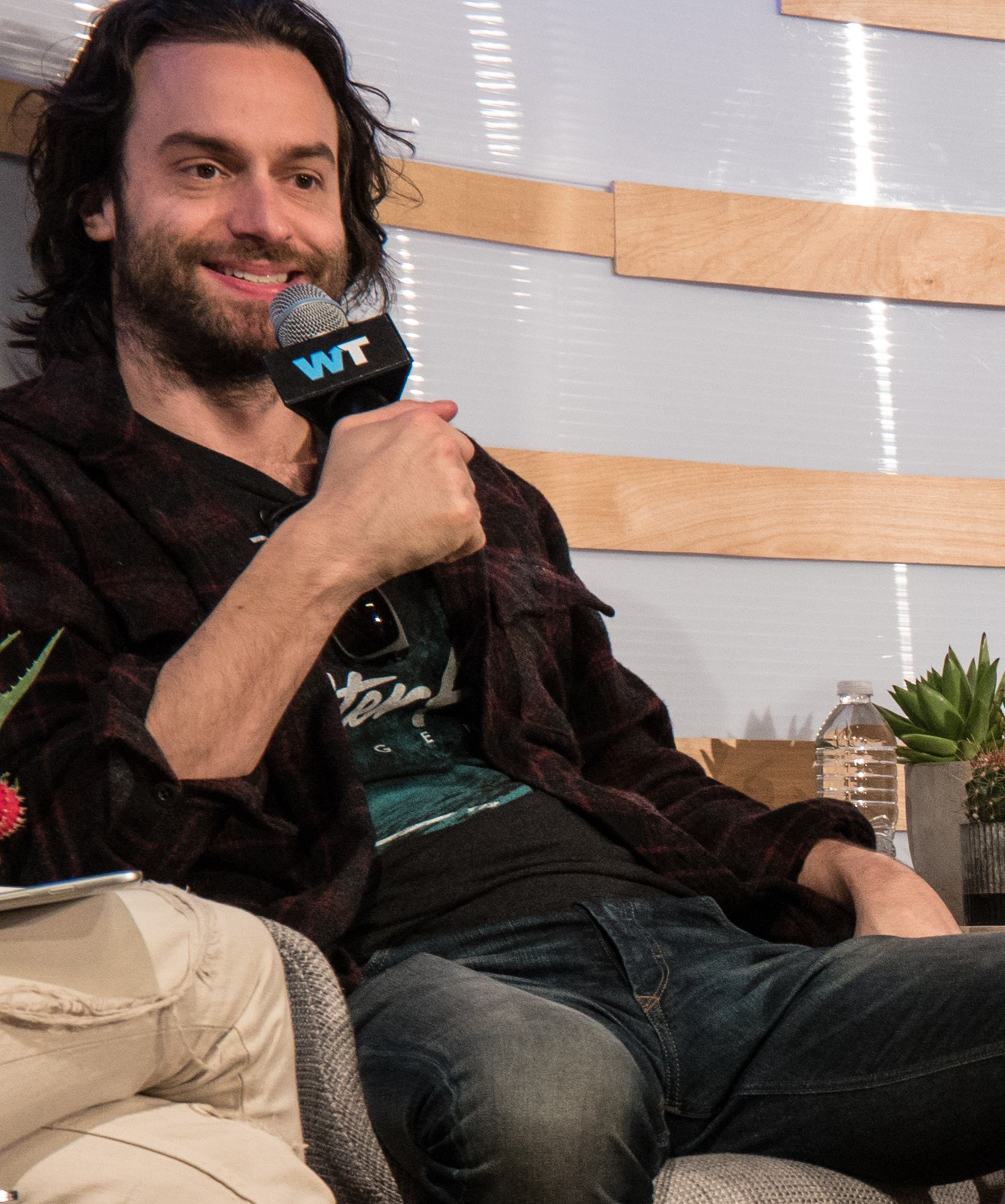
- Chris at SXSW 2015
- Born: March 29, 1980 (age 46); Montclair, New Jersey, U.S.
- Occupations: Comedian; actor; podcaster; writer
- Years active: 1996–present
- Spouses: Emily Montague (m. 2006; div. 2010) Kristin Taylor (m. 2022)
- Father: Bill D'Elia
- Website: chrisdelia.com

Christopher William D'Elia (born March 29, 1980) is an American stand-up comedian, actor, writer, and podcast host. He is known for playing Alex Miller on the NBC sitcom Whitney (2011–2013), Danny Burton on the NBC sitcom Undateable (2014–2016), Kenny on the ABC television series The Good Doctor (2017–2018) and Henderson on the Netflix thriller series You (2019).

== Early life ==
Christopher William D'Elia was born on March 29, 1980, in Montclair, New Jersey. His parents are television producer and director Bill D'Elia, and interior decorator Ellie D'Elia (née Dombroski). His father is a second-generation Italian-American, and his mother is of Polish and Italian descent. His younger brother is filmmaker/actor Matt D'Elia. When D'Elia was 12, the family relocated to Los Angeles and he attended La Cañada High School in the late 1990s.

== Career ==
D'Elia started acting in high school and had some guest roles on Chicago Hope. He attended New York University and studied acting, but dropped out after a year because he did not like college. He then appeared in a movie that went straight to DVD. During his downtime as an actor, he started writing scripts. When he was 25, he decided to try stand-up comedy, which he had always wanted to do.

D'Elia has been performing stand-up comedy since 2006. His first set was at the Ha Ha Café in North Hollywood. He considers himself to be a stand-up comedian who acts. He has been featured on Comedy Central's Live at Gotham and Comedy Central Presents, as well as Showtime's Live Nude Comedy. He was introduced to a broader audience as a regular on the series Glory Daze, which ran for one season on TBS. He was initially cast only for the pilot and was later made a series regular. He then costarred on the NBC comedy series Whitney, opposite comedian Whitney Cummings, for two seasons.

D'Elia was one of three hosts of the Ten Minute Podcast (2012–2015), along with Bryan Callen and Will Sasso. Since February 2017, he has hosted the weekly podcast Congratulations with Chris D'Elia, which has charted in the top 20 comedy podcasts in multiple countries. Listeners of the podcast are often referred to as 'Babies'. Other podcasts have been heavily influenced by his style, including The Fighter and the Kid. D'Elia also gained over 2 million followers on Vine.

In January 2013, D'Elia released his debut parody rap album, as MC "Chank Smith", called Such Is Life (produced by Mr. Green).

On December 6, 2013, D'Elia's first one-hour stand-up special, White Male Black Comic, aired on Comedy Central. He has had three subsequent comedy specials: Incorrigible (2015), Man On Fire (2017), and No Pain (2020), all of which aired on Netflix. These were directed by his father, with the exception of No Pain which was directed by his brother.

D'Elia had a lead role in the 2014–2016 NBC sitcom Undateable as Danny Burton, a ladies' man whose friends are all in one way or another "undateable". The show often incorporated improvisation, with a cast of stand-up comics who were friends before the show. In 2015, executive producer Bill Lawrence and comics from the cast (D'Elia, Brent Morin, Ron Funches and Rick Glassman) went on a series of stand-up tour dates to promote the show.

In 2016, D'Elia headlined the Leafly 420 Comedy Tour show in Chicago with special guest Ron Funches.

In March 2019, it was announced that D'Elia had been cast in the recurring role of Henderson on the second season of the Netflix thriller series You.

On an April 2018 episode of his Congratulations podcast, D'Elia imitated rapper Eminem and made fun of Eminem's middle-aged fans, while conceding that Eminem was "one of the best rappers of all time". Positive reaction to that imitation led D'Elia to imitate Eminem's rapping again in videos he posted online in September 2018 (in his car) and January 2019 (in his garage). In February 2019, Eminem posted the garage video on his Twitter account, writing, "This is INCREDIBLE!!! 4 a second I actually thought it WAS me!!" The May 2019 single "Homicide" by Logic featuring Eminem then included an audio clip from the car video at the end of the song. D'Elia said that it was a "huge honor" to be included in the song and that he did not ask for any royalties. D'Elia then had a substantial role in the music video for the song, released in June 2019, which had each rapper's part performed/lip-synced by someone else: Logic's part was performed by actor Chauncey Leopardi (in reference to a humorous internet meme that claimed that the two were the same person), Eminem's part was performed by D'Elia, and D'Elia's part was performed by Eminem, mimicking the appearance of D'Elia in the car video.

In August 2020, it was officially announced that D'Elia would be replaced by Tig Notaro in Army of the Dead (2021). Trailers for the film were released in April 2021 with Notaro in place of D'Elia.

On January 13, 2022, Brendan Schaub and Theo Von added D'Elia to their weekly podcast "King and the Sting", renaming it to "King and the Sting and Wing". On November 4, 2022, "King and the Sting and Wing" was officially renamed "The Golden Hour", with Workaholics actor Erik Griffin Replacing Von.

Four separate episodes of The Joe Rogan Experience featuring D'Elia have been removed by Spotify, but no reason was given.

== Sexual abuse allegations ==
In June 2020, D'Elia was accused of sexual harassment, child grooming, and solicitation of nude photos by multiple underage girls. D'Elia denied the allegations, saying that he had neither "knowingly pursued any underage women at any point" nor "met or exchanged any inappropriate photos with the people who have tweeted about me."

Comedy Central removed the 2011 Workaholics episode "To Friend a Predator," which features D'Elia as a child molester who befriends the main characters, from its website, Hulu, and Amazon Prime Video. Comedy Central also removed D'Elia's 2013 stand-up special "White Male. Black Comic" from its website. Creative Artists Agency dropped D'Elia due to the allegations. In August 2020, D'Elia who previously was cast in and shot a role for Army of the Dead was replaced by Tig Notaro, due to the allegations.

In early September 2020, CNN Entertainment reported that in 2011 D'Elia asked actress Megan Drust for a ride home from a Los Angeles restaurant. While in the car, D'Elia allegedly unzipped his pants, exposed himself, and started to masturbate before Drust exited the vehicle, saying, "You're defiling my car". According to CNN, two of Drust's friends confirmed being told the story soon after the incident.

In February 2021, D'Elia posted a 10-minute video on his YouTube channel about the allegations, saying "sex controlled my life," and "I stand by the fact that all my relationships have been consensual and legal." He also stated that the allegations represented only a limited view of what had happened and apologized to all who had been affected.

In March 2021, D'Elia was sued by an anonymous woman in U.S. federal court, on allegations that D'Elia sexually abused her and asked her for explicit pictures when she was 17. This allegedly led to the exchange of more than 100 sexually explicit photos and videos via Snapchat in a period of six or seven months in 2014 and 2015, many shared when she was 17 years old. In a statement, a spokesperson for D'Elia said that he denies the allegations. The lawsuit was voluntarily withdrawn by the accuser a little over a month after it was filed.

== Personal life ==
In 2006, D'Elia married actress Emily Montague. They divorced in 2010. On June 18, 2022, Chris married his longtime girlfriend Kristin Taylor. Although his characters in Whitney (Alex Miller) and Undateable (Danny Burton) are both portrayed as frequent drinkers, D'Elia has allegedly never consumed illicit drugs or alcohol.

D'Elia lives in the Beachwood Canyon area of Los Angeles.

== Influences ==
D'Elia has cited Jim Carrey, Bryan Callen, Eddie Murphy, and Mitzi Shore as major influences on his comedic career.

== Filmography ==
=== Film ===
Year	Title	Role	Notes
2004	Almost	Marc	
2005	Bad Girls from Valley High	Gavin	
2005	Crazylove	Jake	
2012	Celeste and Jesse Forever	Snow White	
2013	Funny: The Documentary	Himself	Documentary
2015	Flock of Dudes	Adam	
2016	XOXO	Neil	
2017	Band Aid	Uber Annoying	
2017	The Female Brain	Charlie	
2017	Little Evil	Wayne	
2018	Half Magic	Edward	
2020	Life in a Year	Phil	

=== Television ===
Year	Title	Role	Notes
1996–1997	Chicago Hope	Luke Sarison	2 episodes
2000	Get Real	Chuck	2 episodes
2004	Boston Legal	Kevin Quinlan	Episode: "An Eye for an Eye"
2005	American Dreams	Phil Toolin	Episode: "California Dreamin'"
2005	Monk	Cal Gefsky	Episode: "Mr. Monk Gets Drunk"
2010–2011	Glory Daze	Bill Stankowski	Main role
2011	Workaholics	Topher	Episode: "To Friend a Predator"
2011–2013	Whitney	Alex Miller	Main role
2012	Sullivan & Son	Ryan Capps	Episode: "The Fifth Musketeer"
2013	White Male. Black Comic	Himself	Television special
2013–2016	Sanjay and Craig	Remington Tufflips	Voice, recurring role
2014	Jennifer Falls	Adam	Recurring role
2014–2016	Undateable	Danny Burton	Lead role
2015	Incorrigible	Himself	Television special
2015	The Comedy Central Roast of Justin Bieber	Himself	Television special
2016	Rush Hour	Buddy	Episode: "Welcome Back, Carter"
2016	Typical Rick	Lukee Sado	2 episodes
2016	Lip Sync Battle	Himself	Episode: "Brent Morin vs. Chris D'Elia"
2017	The Great Indoors	Aaron Wolf	Episode: "Aaron Wolf"
2017	Man On Fire	Himself	Television special
2017–2018	The Good Doctor	Kenny	Recurring role (season 1)
2018	Alone Together	Dean	Recurring
2019	Comedians of the World	Himself	Episode: "Chris D'Elia"
2019	Huge in France	Himself	Recurring
2019	You	Henderson	Recurring role (season 2)
2020	No Pain	Himself	Television special

=== Web ===
Year	Title	Role	Notes
2011–2022	The Adam Carolla Show	Himself	Podcast
2012–2016	Ten Minute Podcast	Himself	Podcast
2014–2017	The Joe Rogan Experience	Himself	Podcast
2016	Hot Ones	Himself	Web Series
2016–present	The Fighter and The Kid	Himself	Podcast
2017–present	Congratulations with Chris D'Elia	Himself	Podcast
2018	Tigerbelly	Himself	Podcast
2018–2019	H3 Podcast	Himself	Podcast
2018–present	This Past Weekend with Theo Von	Himself	Podcast
2019	Armchair Expert	Himself	Podcast
2020–2022	The King and The Sting and Wing	Himself	Podcast
2022–present	The Golden Hour	Himself	Podcast
2022–present	Lifeline	Himself	Podcast

== Discography ==
Comedy albums

Title	Album details
Such is Life	Released: February 3, 2013; Formats: CD, digital download; Label: Independent
White Male. Black Comic.	Released: December 10, 2013; Formats: CD+DVD, digital download; Label: Comedy Central Records
