= Brendan Schaub =

American stand-up comedian, podcast host and mixed martial arts fighter

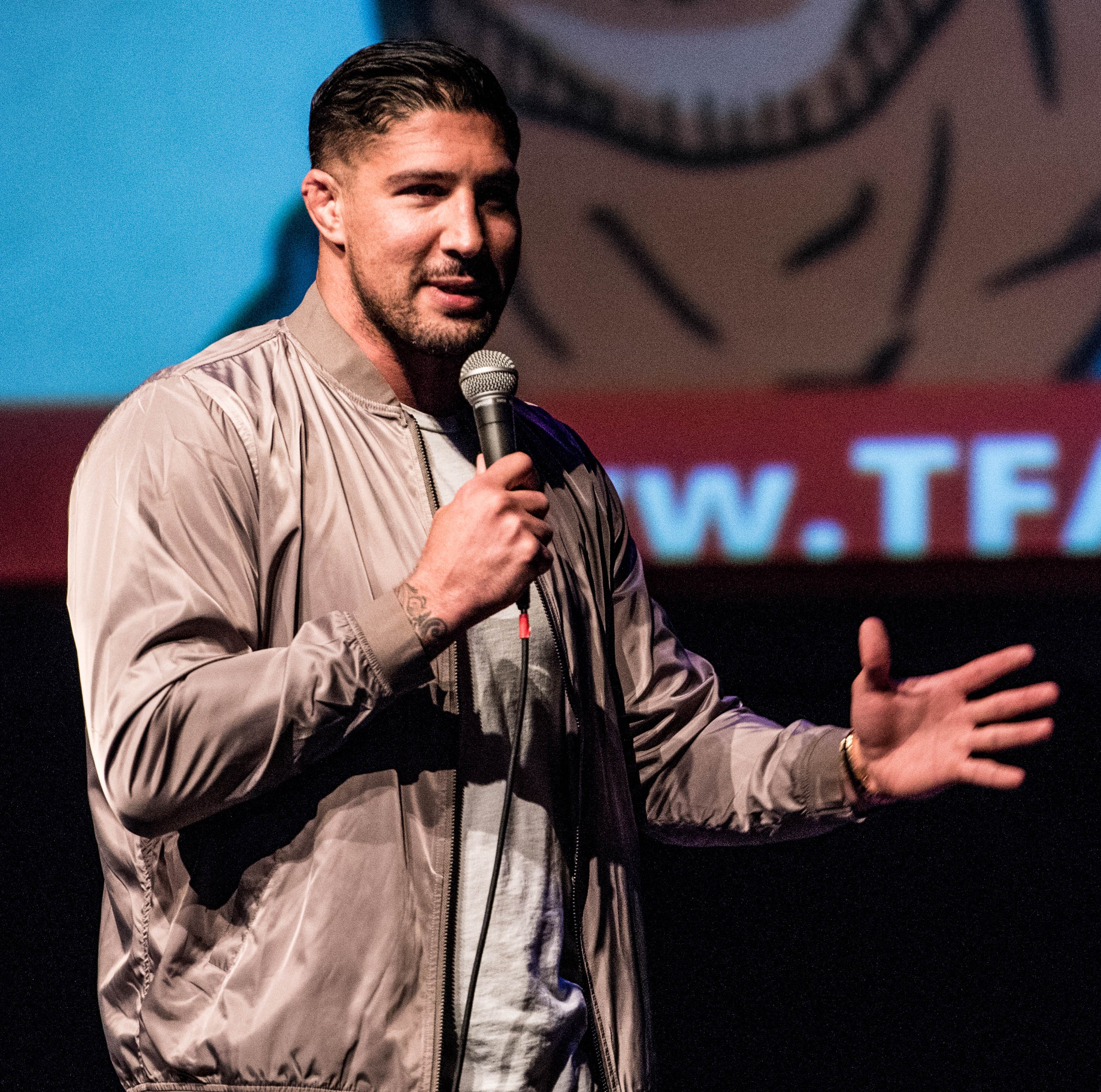
- Schaub in 2016
- Born: Brendan Peter Schaub; March 18, 1983 (age 43); Aurora, Colorado, U.S.
- Other names: "Big Brown" "The Hybrid" "The Sting" "Bapa"
- Education: University of Colorado Boulder
- Occupations: Podcast host, comedian
- Known for: The Fighter and the Kid; Big Brown Breakdown; BELOW THE BELT with Brendan Schaub; King and The Sting and Wing; Golden Hour
- Spouse: Joanna Zanélla Schaub
- Children: 2
Mixed martial arts career
Martial arts career
Height	6 ft 4 in (193 cm)
Weight	238 lb (108 kg; 17 st 0 lb)
Division	Heavyweight
Reach	78 1/2 in (199 cm)
Stance	Orthodox
Fighting out of	Los Angeles, California, United States
Rank	Black belt in Brazilian Jiu-Jitsu
Years active	2008–2014 (MMA)
Mixed martial arts record
Total	15
Wins	10
By knockout	7
By submission	1
By decision	2
Losses	5
By knockout	4
By decision	1
Mixed martial arts exhibition record
Total	3
Wins	3
By knockout	2
By submission	1
Other information
Mixed martial arts record from Sherdog

Brendan Peter Schaub (born March 18, 1983) is an American podcast host, former professional mixed martial artist, and stand-up comedian. He is the host of The Fighter and the Kid podcast, the Below the Belt with Brendan Schaub podcast, and co-host of the Golden Hour podcast, along with fellow comedians Chris D'Elia and Erik Griffin. After signing with Ultimate Fighting Championship (UFC) in 2009 to compete on The Ultimate Fighter, he fought for the company until 2014. He officially retired from mixed martial arts (MMA) in 2015. Since 2015, Schaub has been performing stand-up comedy, initially as a duo act with comedian Bryan Callen, but more recently as a solo comedian. Schaub released his debut comedy special, You'd Be Surprised, in 2019, followed by his second special, The Gringo Papi, in 2022.

== Early life and education ==
Schaub was born and raised in Aurora, Colorado, to an English mother Debra and an American father Peter Schaub. He is of German, Italian, and English descent. While at Overland High School, Schaub lettered two years in varsity lacrosse and one year in varsity American football. He received no college athletic scholarship offers, but he tried out for both the football team and lacrosse team at Whittier College and was accepted to both. Prior to his junior year, he transferred to the University of Colorado to play football full-time where he redshirted his first season. Following college, Schaub went undrafted in the 2006 NFL draft but would sign with the Arena Football League's Utah Blaze, before being released in November 2006 without making the roster. He was once more signed to the Blaze in February 2007 but waived two days later. Schaub then retired from the sport in 2007.

== Mixed martial arts career ==
=== Early career ===
After retiring from football, Schaub returned to Colorado, where he began training in boxing and Brazilian jiu-jitsu. After only six months of training in boxing, he competed in amateur boxing and won the Colorado novice-division Golden Gloves heavyweight title. Schaub later began training at High Altitude Martial Arts in Aurora and the Grudge Training Center in Arvada, where he met UFC heavyweight contender Shane Carwin. The two became friends as well as training partners. After this, he began his professional career in mixed martial arts (MMA), mainly competing in Colorado. Schaub started his career with a 4–0 record and won the heavyweight title for the Ring of Fire organization.

=== Ultimate Fighting Championship ===
==== The Ultimate Fighter ====
In 2009, Schaub signed with Ultimate Fighting Championship (UFC) to compete on the tenth season of The Ultimate Fighter. Schaub was the number two pick for coach Rashad. In his first fight on the show, he faced Demico Rogers, defeating him via first round submission with an anaconda choke to move onto the quarter-finals.

In the quarter-finals, Schaub won his fight by KO (punch) in the second round against Jon Madsen.

In the semi-finals, Schaub defeated Marcus Jones via KO (punches) in the first round.

Schaub made his official UFC debut when he faced Roy Nelson at The Ultimate Fighter: Heavyweights Finale. Schaub lost via KO (punch) in the first round.

==== UFC Heavyweight division ====
In his second UFC bout, Schaub had a 47-second TKO (punches) win over Chase Gormley at UFC Live: Vera vs. Jones.

Schaub next fought Chris Tuchscherer at UFC 116. Schaub won the bout via TKO (punches) in the first round.

Schaub then faced Gabriel Gonzaga at UFC 121. Schaub won via unanimous decision (30–27, 30–27, and 30–27).

Schaub and Frank Mir were tentatively booked for a contest at UFC 128 on March 19, 2011. However, Schaub instead faced Mirko Cro Cop at the event. Schaub won the contest via third-round KO (punch) and was awarded the Knockout of the Night bonus.

On August 27, 2011, at UFC 134, Schaub lost to Antônio Rodrigo Nogueira via KO (punches) in the first round.

He lost his second straight fight, also via KO (punches) to Ben Rothwell on April 21, 2012, at UFC 145.

Schaub was expected to face Lavar Johnson on December 8, 2012, at UFC on Fox 5. However, Johnson was forced out of the bout with a groin injury and Schaub was pulled from the card as well. Schaub fought Johnson on February 23, 2013, at UFC 157. Schaub won via unanimous decision (30–27, 30–27, and 30–27). After, it was announced Johnson tested positive for elevated testosterone in a post-fight drug test.

Schaub was expected to face Matt Mitrione on July 27, 2013, at UFC on Fox 8. However, in mid-July, Mitrione pulled out of the bout citing an injury and Schaub was pulled from the event as well. The bout eventually took place on September 21, 2013, at UFC 165. Schaub defeated Mitrione in the first round via D'Arce choke.

Schaub fought returning former UFC heavyweight champion Andrei Arlovski at UFC 174 on June 14, 2014, with Arlovski winning via split decision.

On December 6, 2014, at UFC 181, Schaub lost via TKO (punches) in the first round to Travis Browne. Days after the fight, Schaub's friend and UFC commentator Joe Rogan had a joint podcast with Schaub and Bryan Callen where Rogan and Callen advised Schaub to retire from MMA and pursue a career in comedy.

Despite previous plans to cut weight and drop to the light heavyweight division (205 lbs) for his 2015 comeback into the UFC, on October 10, 2015, Schaub was a guest on The Joe Rogan Experience podcast and announced his retirement from MMA.

Despite having retired from MMA, Schaub continued training in Brazilian jiu-jitsu. On May 29, 2021, was promoted to the rank of black belt in the sport.

== Post-MMA career ==
Since 2016, Schaub has been doing stand-up comedy and hosting podcasts The Fighter and the Kid and as of 2025, The Schuab Show.

== Championships and accomplishments ==
=== Amateur boxing ===
- Golden Gloves
  - Colorado Heavyweight Golden Gloves (2008)

=== Mixed martial arts ===
- Ring of Fire
  - Ring of Fire Heavyweight Championship (one time)
- Ultimate Fighting Championship
  - Knockout of the Night (one time) vs. Mirko Cro Cop
  - UFC.com Awards
    - 2013: Ranked #10 Submission of the Year vs. Matt Mitrione

== Mixed martial arts record ==
Professional record breakdown
15 matches	10 wins	5 losses
By knockout	7	4
By submission	1	0
By decision	2	1

Res.	Record	Opponent	Method	Event	Date	Round	Time	Location	Notes
Loss	10–5	Travis Browne	TKO (punches)	UFC 181	December 6, 2014	1	4:50	Las Vegas, Nevada, United States	
Loss	10–4	Andrei Arlovski	Decision (split)	UFC 174	June 14, 2014	3	5:00	Vancouver, British Columbia, Canada	
Win	10–3	Matt Mitrione	Technical submission (brabo choke)	UFC 165	September 21, 2013	1	4:06	Toronto, Ontario, Canada	
Win	9–3	Lavar Johnson	Decision (unanimous)	UFC 157	February 23, 2013	3	5:00	Anaheim, California, United States	
Loss	8–3	Ben Rothwell	KO (punches)	UFC 145	April 21, 2012	1	1:10	Atlanta, Georgia, United States	
Loss	8–2	Antônio Rodrigo Nogueira	KO (punches)	UFC 134	August 27, 2011	1	3:09	Rio de Janeiro, Brazil	
Win	8–1	Mirko Cro Cop	KO (punch)	UFC 128	March 19, 2011	3	3:44	Newark, New Jersey, United States	Knockout of the Night.
Win	7–1	Gabriel Gonzaga	Decision (unanimous)	UFC 121	October 23, 2010	3	5:00	Anaheim, California, United States	
Win	6–1	Chris Tuchscherer	TKO (punches)	UFC 116	July 3, 2010	1	1:07	Paradise, Nevada, United States	
Win	5–1	Chase Gormley	TKO (punches)	UFC Live: Vera vs. Jones	March 21, 2010	1	0:47	Broomfield, Colorado, United States	
Loss	4–1	Roy Nelson	KO (punch)	The Ultimate Fighter: Heavyweights Finale	December 5, 2009	1	3:45	Paradise, Nevada, United States	The Ultimate Fighter: Heavyweights Tournament final.
Win	4–0	Bojan Spalević	TKO (punches)	ROF 34 - Judgment Day	April 12, 2009	1	0:52	Broomfield, Colorado, United States	Won the Ring of Fire Heavyweight Championship.
Win	3–0	Alex Rozman	TKO (punches)	ROF 33 - Adrenaline	January 10, 2009	1	1:23	Broomfield, Colorado, United States	
Win	2–0	Johnny Curtis	KO (punches)	UWC: Confrontation	October 11, 2008	1	1:07	George Mason, Virginia, United States	
Win	1–0	Jay Lester	TKO (punches)	ROF 32 - Respect	June 13, 2008	1	0:30	Broomfield, Colorado, United States	

Exhibition record breakdown		
3 matches	3 wins	0 losses
By knockout	2	0
By submission	1	0

Res.	Record	Opponent	Method	Event	Date	Round	Time	Location	Notes
Win	3–0	Marcus Jones	KO (punches)	The Ultimate Fighter: Heavyweights	July 8, 2009	1	2:11	Paradise, Nevada, United States	
Win	2–0	Jon Madsen	KO (punch)	The Ultimate Fighter: Heavyweights	June 29, 2009	2	1:39	Paradise, Nevada, United States	
Win	1–0	Demico Rogers	Submission (anaconda choke)	The Ultimate Fighter: Heavyweights	June 12, 2009	1	3:17	Paradise, Nevada, United States	

== Entertainment career ==
=== Podcasting ===
In 2013, Schaub and Bryan Callen started their podcast titled The Fighter and the Kid. The shows were produced by FOX network until a contract dispute in 2016. They then left the network and began producing the podcast themselves. Schaub and Callen also began touring to perform shows that were a mix between a live podcast and duo stand-up comedy act.

In December 2016, Schaub launched a solo podcast, titled Big Brown Breakdown. The podcast focuses on topics related to combat sports, mainly mixed martial arts.

On the January 30 episode of Big Brown Breakdown, Schaub generated controversy when he suggested that the UFC On Fox panel of presenters had been selected based on race for the sake of diversity. "Sometimes you look at UFC Tonight and you're like, 'Alright, is that the best panel possible? Or are you just trying to check off the boxes?'" Schaub questioned. "We get it, UFC Tonight FOX, you're not racist. We get it, you have an all-black panel. We get it. Woah, we get it. We get it, man."

In February 2018, Schaub partnered with Showtime to rebrand his solo podcast to the name BELOW THE BELT with Brendan Schaub. They also released a web show of the same name, which Schaub hosted.

On December 21, 2018, Schaub and Theo Von announced the creation of a new podcast titled King and the Sting. On January 13, 2022, they added Chris D'Elia to the podcast, renaming it to King and the Sting and Wing.

On November 4, 2022, King and the Sting and Wing was officially renamed The Golden Hour, with Erik Griffin replacing Von.

In September 2023, Schaub and Callen publicly stated that Kast Media and its CEO Colin Thomson owed their production company $1.5–1.6 million. Similar claims were made by Jim Cornette, followed by Theo Von, Jason Ellis, Whitney Cummings, and Alyx Weiss, who also stated they were owed money by Kast Media, including several six-figure and seven-figure shortages. This was in the process of an acquisition of Kast Media by PodcastOne, where Thomson was offering creators partial reimbursement combined with stock options. Amid the news, LiveOne and PodcastOne stock dropped considerably and the company no longer planned to officially hire Thomson. LiveOne took out a high-interest loan to pay Schaub, but did not compensate other creators.

=== Stand-up comedy ===
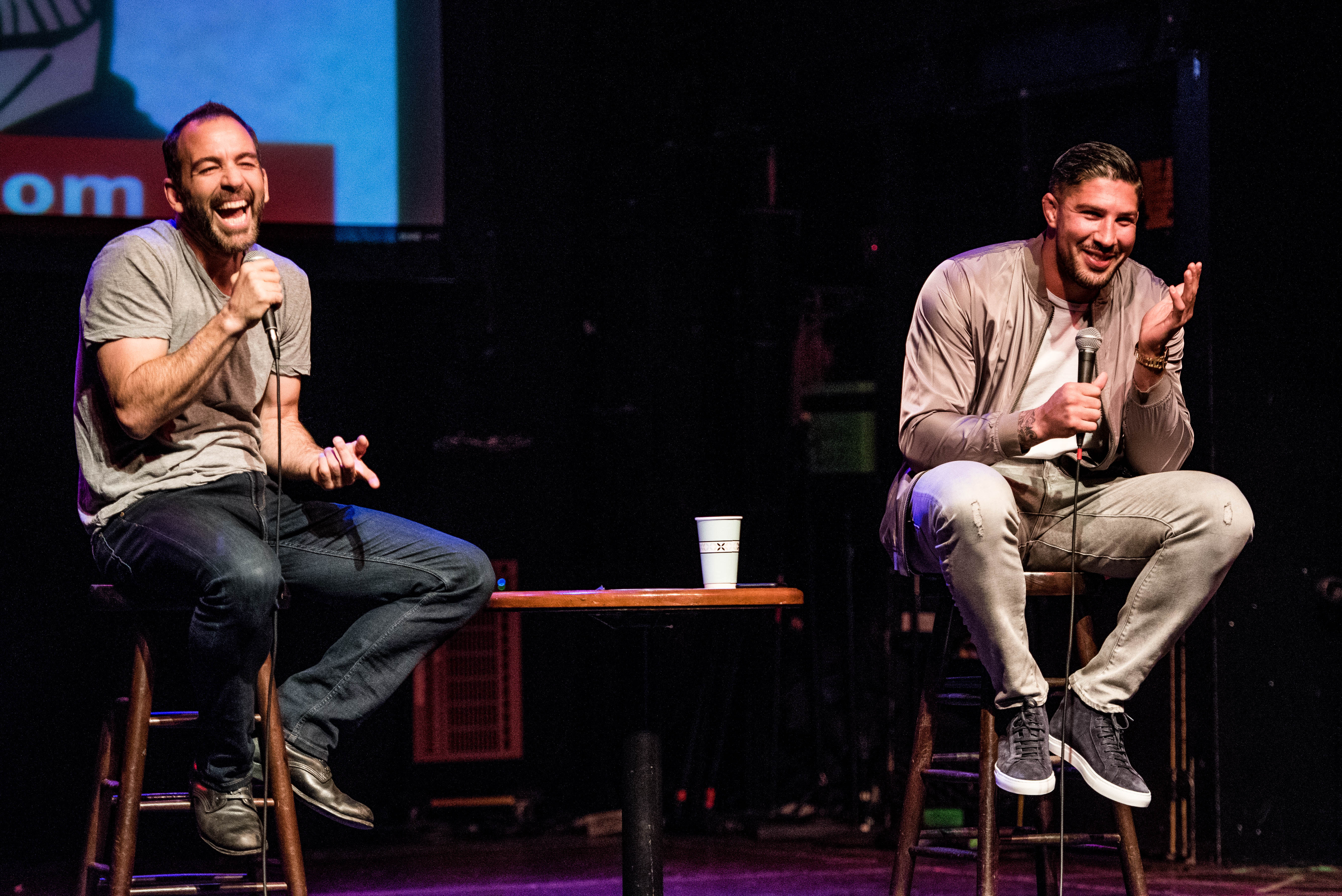
Schaub (right) and Bryan Callen (left) performing a live show

After retiring from mixed martial arts in 2014, Schaub began pursuing a stand-up comedy career. He toured and performed with Bryan Callen until August 10, 2016, when he debuted as a solo comedian at The Comedy Store in Los Angeles, California. In January 2019, Schaub filmed his first Showtime comedy special, You'd Be Surprised, which debuted on May 18, 2019. Schaub released his second comedy special, available through streaming on YouTube, titled The Gringo Papi, on April 28, 2022.

=== Television and film ===
In 2012, Schaub appeared as a guest star on the television series Ghost Adventures during their lockdown investigation.

In 2016, Schaub and Callen released a sketch comedy series on iTunes titled The Fighter and the Kid 3D.

Schaub made his feature film debut in the 2016 movie Range 15.

In 2015, he appeared on the television series MythBusters to help test a myth related to video games.

In 2017, he was brought on by Showtime for commentary and analysis surrounding the Mayweather/McGregor boxing match alongside Mauro Ranallo, Paulie Malignaggi, and Brian Custer.

In 2018, Schaub began working for E! Entertainment news co-hosting the after-shows of the Golden Globes, Academy Awards, Emmy Awards, People's Choice Awards, and Grammy Awards. Also in 2018, he began serving as a panelist for the television show Bravo's Play-By-Play on Bravo network. He made his second feature film appearance in the 2020 David Ayer movie The Tax Collector.

=== Endorsements ===
During his fighting career, Schaub's sponsors included KeepItPlayful.com, the Reign Training Center, Box N Burn Gym, Soul Electronics, and Alchemist Management.

=== Other ventures ===
In 2023, Schaub launched a whisky brand called Tiger Thiccc Whiskey. In a 2022 article by the Dallas Morning News, the name is said to come from "the superior nature of a tiger that allows him ... to overcome adversity from the moment he is born."

== Filmography ==
Year	Title	Role	Notes
2009	The Ultimate Fighter	Himself	Television series
2016	The Fighter and The Kid 3D	Himself	Web series
2016	Range 15	Guard Schaub	Film
2018–current	BELOW THE BELT with Brendan Schaub	Himself	Web show
2018–current	Bravo's Play-By-Play	Himself	Television series
2020	The Tax Collector	Negro	Film

== Personal life ==
Schaub is engaged to long-time girlfriend Joanna Zanella, and they have two sons, born in 2016 and 2019. He previously had a brief relationship with Ronda Rousey.

He has one brother named Jay.

He supports the sports teams of Denver, Colorado, and Los Angeles, California, as well as the Cleveland Browns. He is an avid fan of fashion and automobiles.

According to Schaub, after getting a broken nose in his fight with Mirko Cro Cop, he was prescribed OxyContin for recovery, and spent months addicted to it.

== See also ==
- List of male mixed martial artists
