= Soul Electronics =

Audio equipment company

- Formerly: Signeo USA
- Company type: Private
- Industry: Consumer electronics
- Founded: 2010
- Headquarters: Hong Kong
- Products: Headphones; earbuds; speakers
- Website: soulnation.com

Soul Electronics (stylized as SOUL Electronics or simply SOUL) is an audio equipment company. Founded in 2010, it produces various lines of wireless, Bluetooth-enabled headphones, earbuds, and speakers.

== History ==
Soul Electronics was founded in 2010. The entity was originally known as Signeo USA, an American subsidiary of the Hong Kong-based Signeo Design International. In January 2011 at that year's Consumer Electronics Show (CES), the company introduced SOUL by Ludacris, a line of headphones designed in collaboration with the rapper, Ludacris. The line featured five different pairs of headphones, which were released to the public later in 2011. By that time, the company had become known as Soul Electronics.

In 2012, Soul Electronics partnered with sprinter, Usain Bolt, on the design of a new line of headphones and earbuds designed to be used while running or exercising. In the following two years, the company entered into a number of other sponsored partnerships with athletes, including Brendan Schaub, Tim Tebow, and Alex Fowler. In 2015, the company introduced the Combat+ Sync headphones which came with a built-in walkie-talkie feature. At CES 2018, the company introduced a new artificial intelligence feature in its "Run Free Pro Bio" and "Blade" models that would offer users live, in-ear coaching while running.

In 2019, the company introduced four new products: the Ultra Wireless over-ear headphones, the ST-XX wireless earbuds, the ST-XS2 wireless earphones, and the S-Storm portable Bluetooth speaker. Four additional earbud and earphone lines were released in 2020, including SYNC Pro, the SYNC ANC (active noise-canceling), S-Fit, and S-Gear.

In 2023, the company introduced their first open-ear style headphones called the Openear Series which include Openear 2, Openear Plus, Openear S-Clip and Openear S-Free.

== Products ==
Soul Electronics produces a number of audio products, generally targeted at runners and other consumers who exercise. Its current products include the Ultra Wireless over-ear headphones, the S-Storm portable speaker, and a number of earbud and earphone lines. The company's higher-end earbuds include the SYNC Pro and SYNC ANC. Both of these options come with dual microphones, touch features, and longer battery life than other Soul models. The latter also features active-noise canceling. Its mid-range earbuds include the ST-XX and ST-XS2 which are water-resistant and have touch features. Lower-end models include the S-Fit and S-Gear, which are water-resistant and marketed as an affordable option for runners. All Soul products are Bluetooth compatible.
