= Sagna =

Sagna may refer to:

- Sagna, Neamț, a Romanian commune
- Dharyala Sagna, a town in Pakistan
- Sagna (surname)
