= Sagna (surname) =

Sagna is the surname of the following people

- Augustin Sagna (born 1920), Senegalese prelate
- Bacary Sagna (born 1983), French footballer
- Christian Sagna (born 1982) is a Senegalese footballer
- Henri Sagna (born 1973), Senegalese sculptor
- Lansana Sagna (born 1994), Senegalese football player
- Moussa Sagna Fall (born 1959), Senegalese high jumper
- Pierre Sagna (bishop) (1932–2008) was a Senegalese Roman Catholic bishop
- Pierre Sagna (footballer) (born 1990), a Senegalese footballer
- Pierre Martin Sagna (born 1950), a Senegalese basketball player
- Robert Sagna (born 1939), a Senegalese politician
- Saeid Agin Sagna (born 1975) is a Nigerian football player
- Sidy Sagna (born 1990), Senegalese footballer
