= 2008–09 Arsenal F.C. season =

English football club season

Arsenal
2008–09 season
- Chairman: Peter Hill-Wood
- Manager: Arsène Wenger
- Stadium: Emirates Stadium
- Premier League: 4th
- FA Cup: Semi-finals
- League Cup: Quarter-finals
- UEFA Champions League: Semi-finals
- Top goalscorer: League: Robin van Persie (11); All: Robin van Persie (20)
- Highest home attendance: 60,109 (vs. West Ham United, 31 January 2009, Premier League)
- Lowest home attendance: 55,641 (vs. Hull City, 17 March 2009, FA Cup)
- Average home league attendance: 60,040
Home colours	Away colours

The 2008–09 season was Arsenal Football Club's 17th consecutive season in the Premier League and their 83rd consecutive season in the top flight of English football. This season Arsenal participated in the Premier League, FA Cup, League Cup and the UEFA Champions League. This was the first time since 1986 that Arsenal went four consecutive seasons without winning a trophy.

== Events ==
- 5 May: Midfielder Mathieu Flamini agrees to a four-year contract with Italian club Milan, meaning he will leave Arsenal on a free transfer on 1 July.
- 23 May: Physiotherapist Neal Reynolds agrees to join Arsenal from Norwich City.
- 28 May: Arsenal are granted a work permit for striker Carlos Vela, who spent the 2007–08 season on loan to Osasuna.
- 3 June: Goalkeeper Jens Lehmann joins VfB Stuttgart on a free transfer.
- 4 June: Defender Bacary Sagna signs a new "long-term" contract with Arsenal.
- 9 June: Central defender/defensive midfielder Alex Song agrees to a new "long-term" contract with Arsenal.
- 9 June: Physiotherapist Gary Lewin agrees to leave Arsenal to become full-time Head of Physiotherapy for England on 1 August.
- 13 June: Midfielder Aaron Ramsey signs for Arsenal from Cardiff City.
- 20 June: Defender Gaël Clichy signs a new "long-term" contract with Arsenal.
- 11 July: Attacking midfielder Samir Nasri signs for Arsenal from Marseille.
- 16 July: Attacking midfielder Alexander Hleb signs for Barcelona from Arsenal.
- 17 July: Defensive midfielder Gilberto Silva signs for Panathinaikos from Arsenal.
- 30 July: Arsenal sign midfielder Amaury Bischoff from Werder Bremen.
- 9 August: Arsenal retains their Amsterdam Tournament Title after drawing 1–1 with Sevilla.
- 13 August: Arsenal start their European campaign by defeating Twente in the first leg of their 2008–09 UEFA Champions League Third round qualifying round.
- 16 August: Defender Justin Hoyte signs for Middlesbrough from Arsenal.
- 18 August: Striker Emmanuel Adebayor signs a new "long-term" contract with Arsenal.
- 20 August: Arsenal sign Defender Mikaël Silvestre from Manchester United. Silvestre becomes the first Manchester United player to join Arsenal since Brian Kidd in 1974 .
- 23 August: Arsenal suffer their first defeat of the season against Fulham by losing 1–0 from a Brede Hangeland goal.
- 27 August: Arsenal qualify for the group stages of the Champions League by defeating Twente 4–0 at the Emirates Stadium and 6–0 on aggregate.
- 1 September: Defender Kieran Gibbs signs a new contract with Arsenal.
- 22 September: Swiss defender Johan Djourou signs a new "long-term" contract with Arsenal.
- 27 September: Arsenal's second defeat at the Emirates Stadium was a 2–1 loss to Hull City who came back from an Arsenal lead early in the second half.
- 21 November: Sky Sports News and the BBC report that William Gallas has been stripped of the Arsenal captaincy following a verbal outburst against other players, however Arsenal FC refuse to comment.
- 24 November: Arsène Wenger announces that Cesc Fàbregas is the new permanent Arsenal captain, thus confirming reports that William Gallas has been stripped of the captaincy.
- 23 December: Arsenal captain Cesc Fàbregas is ruled out for 4 months with a ligament injury after colliding with fellow Spaniard Xabi Alonso in a 1–1 draw with Liverpool.
- 5 January: Midfielder Jack Wilshere signs a professional contract with Arsenal.
- 3 February: After protracted transfer negotiations, Arsenal announce the signing of Russian international Andrey Arshavin for an undisclosed fee.
- 8 February: 350 days after suffering a broken leg and open dislocation to his ankle, striker Eduardo is named on the substitutes bench in Arsenal's 0–0 draw against rivals Tottenham Hotspur.
- 16 February: Striker Eduardo makes his first start in nearly a year in Arsenal's fourth round replay against Cardiff. He scores twice before being substituted in the 67th minute in a 4–0 win.
- 11 March: Arsenal progress to the quarter-finals of the Champions League after beating Roma 7–6 on penalties after the tie was level at 1–1 after two legs.
- 14 March: Andrey Arshavin scores his first goal for Arsenal in the club's 4–0 Premier League victory over Blackburn Rovers.
- 18 April: Amid various injuries in defence, Arsenal are knocked out of the FA Cup in a 2–1 defeat to Chelsea at Wembley Stadium in the semi-finals.
- 21 April: 4 goals from man of the match Andrey Arshavin dents Liverpool's Premier League title hopes. The match at Anfield ends in a 4–4 draw.
- 5 May: Arsenal are knocked out of the UEFA Champions League, losing 4–1 on aggregate to defending champions, Manchester United.
- 8 May: Striker Theo Walcott signs a new "long-term" contract with Arsenal.
- 8 May: Striker Nicklas Bendtner is fined for "unacceptable" behaviour following nightclub disrepute after the Manchester United game. Bendtner apologised for his actions shortly afterward.

== Players ==
=== Squad information ===
N	Pos.	Nat.	Name	Age	EU	Since	App	Goals	Ends	Transfer fee	Notes
1	GK	(Spain)	Manuel Almunia	32	EU	2004	125	0	undisclosed	£0.5m	
3	DF	(France)	Bacary Sagna	26	EU	2007	89	1	2014	£7.5m	
5	DF	(Ivory Coast)	Kolo Touré (VC)	28	Non-EU	2002 (Winter)	326	14	undisclosed	£0.15m	
10	DF	(France)	William Gallas	31	EU	2006	109	13	undisclosed	Part exchange with A. Cole+£5m	
22	DF	(France)	Gaël Clichy	23	EU	2003	187	1	2012	£0.25m	
15	MF	(Brazil)	Denílson	21	Non-EU	2006	93	5	undisclosed	£3.4m	
4	MF	(Spain)	Cesc Fàbregas (captain)	22	EU	2003	231	29	2014	Free	
17	DF	(Cameroon)	Alex Song	21	EU	2005	78	3	undisclosed	£1.0m	
8	MF	(France)	Samir Nasri	21	EU	2008	44	7	undisclosed	£12m	
25	FW	(Togo)	Emmanuel Adebayor	25	Non-EU	2006 (Winter)	142	62	undisclosed	£3m	
11	FW	(Netherlands)	Robin van Persie	25	EU	2004	177	63	2011	£2.75m	
26	FW	(Denmark)	Nicklas Bendtner	21	EU	2004	93	23	2012	Youth system	
27	MF	(Ivory Coast)	Emmanuel Eboué	25	Non-EU	2005 (Winter)	147	6	undisclosed	£1.54m	
2	MF	(France)	Abou Diaby	23	EU	2006 (Winter)	98	10	undisclosed	£2m	
14	FW	(England)	Theo Walcott	20	EU	2006 (Winter)	106	14	undisclosed	£9.1m	
20	DF	(Switzerland) (Ivory Coast)	Johan Djourou	22	Non-EU	2003	77	0	undisclosed	Youth system	
12	FW	(Mexico)	Carlos Vela	20	Non-EU	2005	29	6	2010	£0.5m	
18	DF	(France)	Mikaël Silvestre	31	EU	2008	23	2	2010	£0.75m	
16	MF	(Wales)	Aaron Ramsey	18	EU	2008	22	1	undisclosed	£4.8m	
40	DF	(England)	Kieran Gibbs	19	EU	2007	23	0	undisclosed	Youth system	
21	GK	(Poland)	Łukasz Fabiański	24	EU	2007	26	0	undisclosed	£2.0m	
23	MF	(Russia)	Andrey Arshavin	27	Non-EU	2009 (Winter)	15	6	2012	£15.0m	
19	MF	(England)	Jack Wilshere	17	EU	2008	8	1	undisclosed	Youth system	
9	FW	(Croatia) (Brazil)	Eduardo	26	Non-EU	2007	35	15	2011	£7.5m	
28	MF	(Portugal) (France)	Amaury Bischoff	22	EU	2008	4	0	undisclosed	Free	
24	GK	(Italy)	Vito Mannone	21	EU	2005	1	0	undisclosed	£0.35m	
7	MF	(Czech Republic)	Tomáš Rosický	28	EU	2006	61	13	undisclosed	£6.8m	

- Last updated: 24 May
- Source: Arsenal FC and footballdatabase.com (for EU passport, country as international player, contract ending and transfer fee)
- Ordered by Starting 11, then appearances in this season.

=== Transfers ===
==== In ====
#	Position	Player	Transferred from	Fee	Date	Team	Source
16	MF	(Wales) Aaron Ramsey	(Wales) Cardiff City	£4,800,000	13 June 2008	First-team	
8	MF	(France) Samir Nasri	(France) Marseille	£12,000,000	11 July 2008	First-team	
28	MF	(Portugal) Amaury Bischoff	(Germany) Werder Bremen	Free transfer	30 July 2008	First-team	
18	DF	(France) Mikaël Silvestre	(England) Manchester United	£750,000	20 August 2008	First-team	
23	MF	(Russia) Andrey Arshavin	(Russia) Zenit Saint Petersburg	£15,000,000	3 February 2009	First-team	

Total spending: ▼£32,550,000

==== Out ====
#	Position	Player	Transferred to	Fee	Date	Source
1	GK	(Germany) Jens Lehmann	(Germany) VfB Stuttgart	Free transfer (Released)	3 June 2008	
16	MF	(France) Mathieu Flamini	(Italy) Milan	Free transfer (Released)	1 July 2008	
13	MF	(Belarus) Alexander Hleb	(Spain) Barcelona	£11,900,000	16 July 2008	
19	MF	(Brazil) Gilberto Silva	(Greece) Panathinaikos	£1,000,000	17 July 2008	
31	DF	(England) Justin Hoyte	(England) Middlesbrough	£3,000,000	16 August 2008	

Total income: ▲£15,900,000

==== Loan out ====
Squad #	Position	Player	Loaned to	Date	Loan expires	Source
	DF	(England) Kerrea Gilbert	(England) Leicester City	11 July 2008	End of the season	
6	DF	(Switzerland) Philippe Senderos	(Italy) Milan	26 July 2008	End of the season	
	MF	(Netherlands) Nacer Barazite	(England) Derby County	19 August 2008	End of the season (extended on 31 December 2008)	
30	DF	(France) Armand Traoré	(England) Portsmouth	21 August 2008	End of the season	
50	FW	(England) Jay Simpson	(England) West Bromwich Albion	31 December 2008	End of the season	

==== Overall transfer activity ====
===== Spending =====
▼£32,550,000

===== Income =====
▲£15,900,000

===== Net expenditure =====
▼£16,650,000

=== Squad stats ===
No.	Pos	Nat	Player	Total		Premier League		FA Cup		League Cup		Champions League	
No.	Pos	Nat	Player	Apps	Goals	Apps	Goals	Apps	Goals	Apps	Goals	Apps	Goals
1	GK	(Spain) ESP	Manuel Almunia	44	0	32	0	0	0	0	0	12	0
2	MF	(France) FRA	Abou Diaby	36	4	16+8	3	4+1	0	0	0	5+2	1
3	DF	(France) FRA	Bacary Sagna	49	0	34+1	0	5	0	0	0	9	0
4	MF	(Spain) ESP	Cesc Fàbregas	33	3	22	3	1	0	0	0	10	0
5	DF	(Ivory Coast) CIV	Kolo Touré	41	1	26+3	1	3	0	0	0	9	0
7	MF	(Czech Republic) CZE	Tomáš Rosický	0	0	0	0	0	0	0	0	0	0
8	MF	(France) FRA	Samir Nasri	44	7	28+1	6	3+2	0	0	0	10	1
9	FW	(Croatia) CRO	Eduardo	4	3	0	0	2	3	0	0	0+2	0
10	DF	(France) FRA	William Gallas	36	6	23	2	4	1	0	0	9	3
11	FW	(Netherlands) NED	Robin van Persie	44	20	24+4	11	4+2	4	0	0	10	5
12	FW	(Mexico) MEX	Carlos Vela	29	6	2+12	1	3+1	1	3	4	2+6	0
14	FW	(England) ENG	Theo Walcott	35	6	16+6	2	2+1	1	0	0	9+1	3
15	MF	(Brazil) BRA	Denílson	51	3	36+1	3	2	0	0	0	11+1	0
16	MF	(Wales) WAL	Aaron Ramsey	22	1	1+8	0	2+2	0	3	0	4+2	1
17	DM	(Cameroon) CMR	Alex Song	48	2	23+8	1	4	0	2	0	8+3	1
18	DF	(France) FRA	Mikaël Silvestre	23	2	12+2	2	2	0	1	0	6	0
19	MF	(England) ENG	Jack Wilshere	8	1	0+1	0	0+2	0	3	1	0+2	0
20	DF	(Switzerland) SUI	Johan Djourou	29	0	13+2	0	4	0	2	0	6+2	0
21	GK	(Poland) POL	Łukasz Fabiański	18	0	5+1	0	6	0	3	0	2+1	0
22	DF	(France) FRA	Gaël Clichy	41	1	30+1	1	0	0	0	0	10	0
23	MF	(Russia) RUS	Andrey Arshavin	15	6	12	6	2+1	0	0	0	0	0
24	GK	(Italy) ITA	Vito Mannone	1	0	1	0	0	0	0	0	0	0
25	FW	(Togo) TOG	Emmanuel Adebayor	37	16	21+5	10	1+1	0	0	0	8+1	6
26	FW	(Denmark) DEN	Nicklas Bendtner	50	15	17+14	9	3+2	2	2	2	5+7	2
27	DF	(Ivory Coast) CIV	Emmanuel Eboué	44	4	17+11	3	4+1	1	0	0	6+5	0
28	MF	(Portugal) POR	Amaury Bischoff	4	0	0+1	0	0+1	0	0+2	0	0	0
35	MF	(France) FRA	Francis Coquelin [R]	1	0	0	0	0	0	0+1	0	0	0
39	FW	(Portugal) POR	Rui Fonte [R]	1	0	0	0	0	0	0+1	0	0	0
40	DF	(England) ENG	Kieran Gibbs	21	0	6+2	0	5+1	0	3	0	3+1	0
41	DF	(England) ENG	Gavin Hoyte [R]	4	0	1	0	0	0	3	0	0	0
42	MF	(England) ENG	Henri Lansbury [R]	3	0	0	0	0	0	0+3	0	0	0
43	MF	(Spain) ESP	Fran Mérida [R]	5	0	0+2	0	0	0	3	0	0	0
47	MF	(England) ENG	Mark Randall [R]	6	0	0+1	0	0	0	3	0	0+2	0
49	DF	(England) ENG	Paul Rodgers [R]	1	0	0	0	0	0	1	0	0	0
50	FW	(England) ENG	Jay Simpson [R] [L]	3	2	0	0	0	0	1+2	2	0	0

Source: Arsenal F.C.

=== Disciplinary record ===
N	Pos.	Nat.	Name	Yellow card	Second yellow card	Red card	Notes
11	FW	(Netherlands)	v. Persie	9	0	1	
25	FW	(Togo)	Adebayor	5	1	0	
27	MF	(Ivory Coast)	Eboué	3	1	0	
22	DF	(France)	Clichy	9	0	0	
17	DF	(Cameroon)	Song	8	0	0	
8	MF	(France)	Nasri	8	0	0	
4	MF	(Spain)	Fàbregas	8	0	0	
2	MF	(France)	Diaby	7	0	0	
10	DF	(France)	Gallas	5	0	0	
3	DF	(France)	Sagna	5	0	0	
15	MF	(Brazil)	Denílson	5	0	0	
26	FW	(Denmark)	Bendtner	4	0	0	
5	DF	(Ivory Coast)	Touré	4	0	0	
40	DF	(England)	Gibbs	2	0	0	
20	DF	(Switzerland) (Ivory Coast)	Djourou	2	0	0	
16	MF	(Wales)	Ramsey	2	0	0	
23	MF	(Russia)	Arshavin	2	0	0	
47	MF	(England)	Randall	1	0	0	
43	MF	(Spain)	Mérida	1	0	0	
12	FW	(Mexico)	Vela	1	0	0	
18	DF	(France)	Silvestre	1	0	0	

Last updated: 24 May
Source: Match reports in Competitive matches
Only competitive matches
(yellow card) = Number of bookings; (second yellow card) = Number of sending offs after a second yellow card; (red card) = Number of sending offs by a direct red card.

=== Start formations ===
Qnt	Formation	Match(es)
51	4–4–2	1–13, 15–29, 31–49, 52–53, 57–58, 61
8	4–2–3–1	14, 50–51, 54–56, 59–60
1	4–4–1–1	30

Last updated: 24 May
Only competitive matches.

== Club ==
=== Coaching staff ===
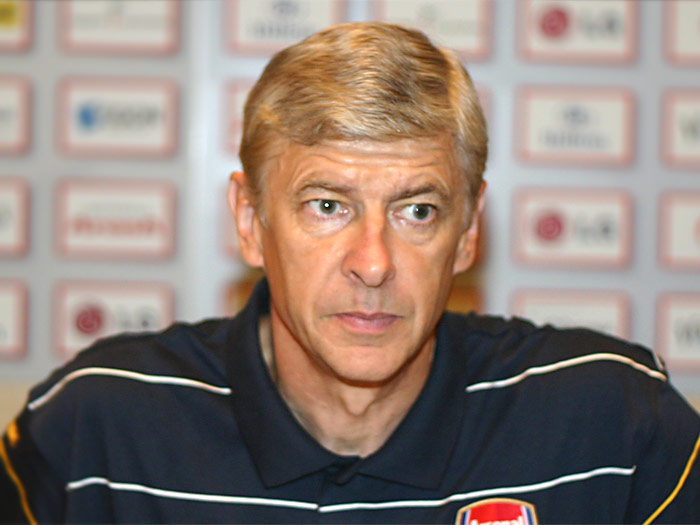
This was Arsène Wenger's 13th seasons with Arsenal.

Position	Staff
Manager	(France) Arsène Wenger
Assistant manager	(Northern Ireland) Pat Rice
First team coach	(Bosnia and Herzegovina) Boro Primorac
Goalkeeping coach	(Republic of Ireland) Gerry Peyton
Physiotherapist	(England) Colin Lewin
Fitness coach	(England) Tony Colbert
Chief scout	(England) Steve Rowley
Kit manager	(England) Vic Akers

Source: Arsenal FC

=== Kit ===
Supplier: Nike / Sponsor: Fly Emirates

Home	Home alt.	Away	Goalkeeper 1	Goalkeeper alt.	Goalkeeper 2	Goalkeeper 3	Goalkeeper alt.	Goalkeeper alt. 2

=== Kit information ===
The completely new set of Arsenal kit was launched.

- Home: The home kit was rather controversial, as Nike ditched the white sleeves that the club was well known for. The shirt has a white wide stripe on each sleeve, flanked by two dark red, narrower stripes. It has a red V-neck collar which is the same colour as the primary shirt colour. The shirt is complemented by white shorts with a dark-red trim, and white socks with a red horizontal stripe. Red socks with white horizontal stripe were used in some away games avoid clash. Arsenal revealed that the kit would be used for two seasons.
- Away: The away kit goes back to the glory days of the late 1980s which gave the strip a modern touch, where the shirts are yellow with navy sleeves and a red trim. The shorts are navy with red trim and the socks are yellow and blue. It featured red trimmings on the side of the strip.
- Keeper: The three goalkeeper kits, which were all based on Nike's new template, which in turn featured one conspicuous swirl on the kit. The main kit was grey, but the second kit was green/navy and the third kit black was available, should they be required.

=== Other information ===
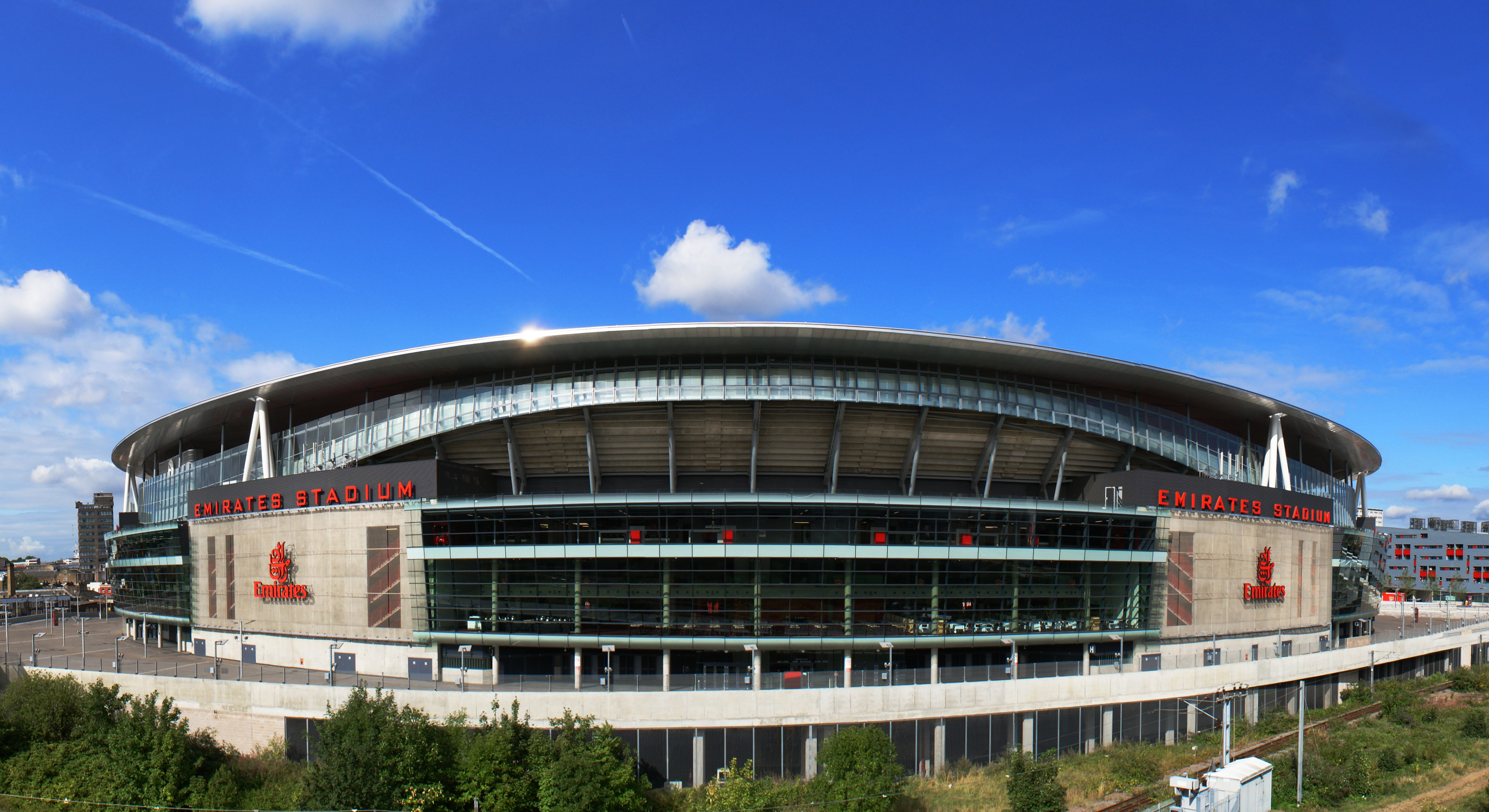
The Emirates Stadium is the second largest stadium in the Premier League.

Chairman	(England) Peter Hill-Wood
Ground (capacity and dimensions)	Emirates Stadium (60,432 / 105x68 meters)

Updated to match played 15 June
Source: Arsenal FC and www.footballgroundguide.com

== Competitions ==
=== Overall ===
Competition	Started round	Final position / round	First match	Last match
Premier League	—	4	16 August	24 May
Champions League	Third qualifying round	Semi-finals	13 August	5 May
Football League Cup	3rd round	Quarter finals	23 September	2 December
FA Cup	3rd round	Semi-finals	3 January	18 April

Updated to match played 24 May
Source: Competitions

=== Premier League ===
==== Final league table ====
Pos	Team	Pld	W	D	L	GF	GA	GD	Pts	Qualification or relegation
2	Liverpool	38	25	11	2	77	27	+50	86	Qualification for the Champions League group stage (Note: Since both finalists of the FA Cup (Chelsea and Everton) and the League Cup winners (Manchester United) qualified for the European competitions based on their league position, the sixth-placed team (Aston Villa) received a berth in the Europa League play-off round and the seventh-placed team (Fulham) received a berth in the Europa League third qualifying round.)
3	Chelsea	38	25	8	5	68	24	+44	83	Qualification for the Champions League group stage
4	Arsenal	38	20	12	6	68	37	+31	72	Qualification for the Champions League play-off round
5	Everton	38	17	12	9	55	37	+18	63	Qualification for the Europa League play-off round
6	Aston Villa	38	17	11	10	54	48	+6	62	Qualification for the Europa League play-off round

Source: Barclays Premier League
Rules for classification: 1) points; 2) goal difference; 3) number of goals scored.

==== Results summary ====
Overall								Home						Away					
Pld	W	D	L	GF	GA	GD	Pts	W	D	L	GF	GA	GD	W	D	L	GF	GA	GD
38	20	12	6	68	37	+31	72	11	5	3	31	16	+15	9	7	3	37	21	+16

Last updated: 24 May.
Source: Premier League

==== Results by round ====
Round	1	2	3	4	5	6	7	8	9	10	11	12	13	14	15	16	17	18	19	20	21	22	23	24	25	26	27	28	29	30	31	32	33	34	35	36	37	38
Ground	H	A	H	A	A	H	A	H	A	H	A	H	H	A	A	H	A	H	A	H	H	A	A	H	A	H	H	A	H	A	H	A	A	H	A	H	A	H
Result	W	L	W	W	W	L	D	W	W	D	L	W	L	L	W	W	D	D	D	W	W	W	D	D	D	D	D	W	W	W	W	W	D	W	W	L	D	W
Position	8	14	4	3	1	4	4	4	4	3	4	3	4	5	4	4	5	5	5	5	5	5	5	5	5	5	5	5	4	4	4	4	4	4	4	4	4	4

Updated to match(es) played on 24 May. Source: Competitive Matches
A = Away; H = Home; W = Win; D = Draw; L = Loss

==== Matches ====
16 August 2008 1	Arsenal	1–0	West Bromwich Albion	London
12:45 BST	Nasri 4'	Report		Stadium: Emirates Stadium; Attendance: 60,071; Referee: Howard Webb

23 August 2008 2	Fulham	1–0	Arsenal	London
17:30 BST	Hangeland 21'; Murphy (yellow card) 72'; Teymourian (yellow card) 88'	Report		Stadium: Craven Cottage; Attendance: 25,276; Referee: Martin Atkinson

30 August 2008 3	Arsenal	3–0	Newcastle United	London
17:30 BST	Van Persie 18' (pen.), 41'; Fàbregas (yellow card) 52'; Denílson 59'; Nasri (yellow card) 90+2'	Report	(yellow card) 28' Coloccini; (yellow card) 52' Given	Stadium: Emirates Stadium; Attendance: 60,067; Referee: Rob Styles

13 September 2008 4	Blackburn Rovers	0–4	Arsenal	Blackburn
15:00 BST	Warnock (yellow card) 80'	Report	8' Van Persie; 45+1', 81' (pen.), 90+2' Adebayor; (yellow card) 60' Denílson	Stadium: Ewood Park; Attendance: 23,041; Referee: Mike Dean

20 September 2008 5	Bolton Wanderers	1–3	Arsenal	Bolton
17:30 BST	K. Davies 14', (yellow card) 45+2'; Muamba (yellow card) 62'	Report	26' Eboué; 27' Bendtner; (yellow card) 76' Song; 87' Denílson; (yellow card) 89' Fàbregas	Stadium: Reebok Stadium; Attendance: 22,694; Referee: Steve Bennett

27 September 2008 6	Arsenal	1–2	Hull City	London
17:30 BST	McShane 51' (o.g.); Sagna (yellow card) 76'; Gallas (yellow card) 90+4'	Report	(yellow card) 45' Ashbee; 62' Geovanni; 66' Cousin	Stadium: Emirates Stadium; Attendance: 60,037; Referee: Alan Wiley

4 October 2008 7	Sunderland	1–1	Arsenal	Sunderland
15:00 BST	Whitehead (yellow card) 41'; Richardson (yellow card) 65'; Yorke (yellow card) 73'; Leadbitter 86'	Report	(yellow card) 39' Clichy; (yellow card) 61' Touré; (yellow card) 78' Song; (yellow card) 90' Bendtner; 90+3' Fàbregas	Stadium: Stadium of Light; Attendance: 40,199; Referee: Lee Mason

18 October 2008 8	Arsenal	3–1	Everton	London
15:00 BST	Adebayor (yellow card) 34'; Nasri 48'; Clichy (yellow card) 59'; Van Persie 70'; Walcott 90'	Report	9', (yellow card) 87' Osman; (yellow card) 30' Lescott; (yellow card) 60' Hibbert; (yellow card) 65' Pienaar	Stadium: Emirates Stadium; Attendance: 60,064; Referee: Peter Walton

26 October 2008 9	West Ham United	0–2	Arsenal	London
16:00 BST	Parker (yellow card) 43'; Faubert (yellow card) 88'; Cole (red card) 90+3'	Report	(yellow card) 27' Fàbregas; (yellow card) 51' Clichy; (yellow card) 59' Song; 75' (o.g.) Faubert; 90+1' Adebayor	Stadium: Upton Park; Attendance: 34,802; Referee: Phil Dowd

29 October 2008 10	Arsenal	4–4	Tottenham Hotpsur	London
20:00 BST	Silvestre 37'; Gallas 46'; Adebayor 64'; Van Persie 68'; Diaby (yellow card) 89'	Report	13', (yellow card) 57' Bentley; (yellow card) 54' Assou-Ekotto; (yellow card) 59' Huddlestone; 67' Bent; (yellow card) 85', (goal) 89' Jenas; 90+4' Lennon	Stadium: Emirates Stadium; Attendance: 60,043; Referee: Martin Atkinson

1 November 2008 11	Stoke City	2–1	Arsenal	Stoke-on-Trent
15:00 GMT	Fuller 11'; Higginbotham (yellow card) 63'; Sidibe (yellow card) 68'; Olofinjana 73'; Cresswell (yellow card) 90+7'	Report	(yellow card) 40' Adebayor; (red card) 76' Van Persie; 90+4' Clichy; (yellow card) 90+7' Fàbregas	Stadium: Britannia Stadium; Attendance: 26,704; Referee: Rob Styles

8 November 2008 12	Arsenal	2–1	Manchester United	London
12:45 GMT	Nasri 22', 48'; Gallas (yellow card) 27'; Sagna (yellow card) 40'; Clichy (yellow card) 51'	Report	(yellow card) 38' Evra; (yellow card) 66' Carrick; 90' Rafael	Stadium: Emirates Stadium; Attendance: 60,106; Referee: Howard Webb

15 November 2008 13	Arsenal	0–2	Aston Villa	London
15:00 GMT	Denílson (yellow card) 10'; Fàbregas (yellow card) 19'	Report	(yellow card) 44' Friedel; (yellow card) 55' Barry; 70' (o.g.) Clichy; 80', (yellow card) 81' Agbonlahor; (yellow card) 90' Sidwell	Stadium: Emirates Stadium; Attendance: 60,047; Referee: Mike Riley

22 November 2008 14	Manchester City	3–0	Arsenal	Manchester
15:00 GMT	Ireland 45'; Robinho 56'; Sturridge 90' (pen.)	Report	(yellow card) 87' Song	Stadium: City of Manchester Stadium; Attendance: 44,878; Referee: Alan Wiley

30 November 2008 15	Chelsea	1–2	Arsenal	London
16:00 GMT	Djourou 31' (o.g.); Terry (yellow card) 61'; Ivanović (yellow card) 85'	Report	59', 62' Van Persie	Stadium: Stamford Bridge; Attendance: 41,760; Referee: Mike Dean

6 December 2008 16	Arsenal	1–0	Wigan Athletic	London
15:00 GMT	Adebayor 16'; Van Persie (yellow card) 83'	Report	(yellow card) 26' Palacios; (yellow card) 63' Figueroa	Stadium: Emirates Stadium; Attendance: 59,317; Referee: Steve Bennett

13 December 2008 17	Middlesbrough	1–1	Arsenal	Middlesbrough
12:45 GMT	Aliadière 29'	Report	17' Adebayor; (yellow card) 47' Diaby	Stadium: Riverside Stadium; Attendance: 27,320; Referee: Peter Walton

21 December 2008 18	Arsenal	1–1	Liverpool	London
16:00 GMT	Van Persie 24', (yellow card) 66'; Adebayor (yellow card) 38' (yellow-red card) 62'; Sagna (yellow card) 70'	Report	(yellow card) 20', (goal) 42' Keane; (yellow card) 72' Carragher; (yellow card) 81' Lucas	Stadium: Emirates Stadium; Attendance: 60,094; Referee: Howard Webb

26 December 2008 19	Aston Villa	2–2	Arsenal	Birmingham
17:15 GMT	Barry 65' (pen.); Agbonlahor (yellow card) 72'; Reo-Coker (yellow card) 77'; Petrov (yellow card) 82'; Knight 90+2'	Report	(yellow card) 24' Song; (yellow card) 36' Touré; 40' Denílson; 49', (yellow card) 51' Diaby; (yellow card) 77' Van Persie	Stadium: Villa Park; Attendance: 42,585; Referee: Lee Mason

28 December 2008 20	Arsenal	1–0	Portsmouth	London
14:00 GMT	Gallas 81'	Report	(yellow card) 42' Hughes	Stadium: Emirates Stadium; Attendance: 60,092; Referee: Alan Wiley

10 January 2009 21	Arsenal	1–0	Bolton Wanderers	London
15:00 GMT	Djourou (yellow card) 80'; Bendtner 84'; Ramsey (yellow card) 89'	Report	(yellow card) 54' Mustapha; (yellow card) 74' McCann	Stadium: Emirates Stadium; Attendance: 60,068; Referee: Chris Foy

17 January 2009 22	Hull City	1–3	Arsenal	KC Stadium
17:30 GMT	Cousin 65'; Ashbee (yellow card) 81'	Report	30' Adebayor; (yellow card) 71' Clichy; 82' Nasri; 86' Bendtner	Stadium: Kingston-upon-Hull; Attendance: 24,924; Referee: Alan Wiley

28 January 2009 23	Everton	1–1	Arsenal	Liverpool
20:00 GMT	Cahill 61'; Arteta (yellow card) 70'; Hibbert (yellow card) 77'	Report	(yellow card) 27' Diaby; (yellow card) 36' Nasri; 90+2' Van Persie	Stadium: Goodison Park; Attendance: 37,097; Referee: Andre Marriner

31 January 2009 24	Arsenal	0–0	West Ham United	London
15:00 GMT	Diaby (yellow card) 22'; Vela (yellow card) 75'	Report	(yellow card) 56' Collins; (yellow card) 85' Neill	Stadium: Emirates Stadium; Attendance: 60,109; Referee: Steve Bennett

8 February 2009 25	Tottenham Hotspur	0–0	Arsenal	London
13:30 GMT	Modrić (yellow card) 36'	Report	(red card) 17' Eboué; (yellow card) 43' Clichy	Stadium: White Hart Lane; Attendance: 36,021; Referee: Mike Dean

21 February 2009 26	Arsenal	0–0	Sunderland	London
15:00 GMT	Nasri (yellow card) 39'; Clichy (yellow card) 71'	Report	(yellow card) 38' Richardson; (yellow card) 79' McCartney	Stadium: Emirates Stadium; Attendance: 60,104; Referee: Alan Wiley

28 February 2009 27	Arsenal	0–0	Fulham	London
15:00 GMT		Report		Stadium: Emirates Stadium; Attendance: 60,102; Referee: Peter Walton

3 March 2009 28	West Bromwich Albion	1–3	Arsenal	West Bromwich
17:30 GMT	Brunt 7'; Koren (yellow card) 35'; Brunt (yellow card) 43'; Méïté (yellow card) 66'; Donk (yellow card) 81'	Report	4', 44' Bendtner; 38' Touré	Stadium: The Hawthorns; Attendance: 26,244; Referee: Steve Tanner

14 March 2009 29	Arsenal	4–0	Blackburn Rovers	London
15:00 GMT	Ooijer 2' (o.g.); Arshavin 65'; Eboué 87', 90+1' (pen.)	Report	(yellow card) 21' Diouf; (yellow card) 35' Mokoena; (yellow card) 38' Khizanishvili; (yellow card) 76' Ooijer	Stadium: Emirates Stadium; Attendance: 60,091; Referee: Phil Dowd

21 March 2009 30	Newcastle United	1–3	Arsenal	Newcastle upon Tyne
17:30 GMT	Martins 58'	Report	(yellow card) 52' Gallas; 57' Bendtner; 64' Diaby; 67' Nasri	Stadium: St James' Park; Attendance: 49,972; Referee: Mark Halsey

4 April 2009 31	Arsenal	2–0	Manchester City	London
15:00 BST	Adebayor 8', 49'; Touré (yellow card) 36'	Report	(yellow card) 21' Dunne; (yellow card) 45' Zabaleta; (yellow card) 45+1' De Jong	Stadium: Emirates Stadium; Attendance: 60,097; Referee: Howard Webb

11 April 2009 32	Wigan Athletic	1–4	Arsenal	Wigan, Greater Manchester
15:00 BST	Mido 18'; Brown (yellow card) 71'; Boyce (yellow card) 86'; Bramble (yellow card) 87'	Report	(yellow card) 45+4' Gibbs; 62' Walcott; 71' Silvestre; (yellow card) 83' Van Persie; (yellow card) 88', (goal) 90+2' Song; 90' Arshavin	Stadium: JJB Stadium; Attendance: 22,954; Referee: Alan Wiley

21 April 2009 33	Liverpool	4–4	Arsenal	Liverpool
20:00 BST	Torres 49', 72'; Benayoun 56', 90+3'	Report	36', 67', 70', 90' Arshavin; (yellow card) 61' Sagna	Stadium: Anfield; Attendance: 44,424; Referee: Howard Webb

26 April 2009 34	Arsenal	2–0	Middlesbrough	London
13:30 BST	Fàbregas 26', 67'	Report		Stadium: Emirates Stadium; Attendance: 60,089; Referee: Chris Foy

2 May 2009 35	Portsmouth	0–3	Arsenal	Portsmouth
15:00 BST	Campbell (yellow card) 43'; Kanu (yellow card) 65'; Pamarot (red card) 79'; Davis (yellow card) 81'	Report	13', 41' (pen.) Bendtner; (yellow card) 21' Arshavin; 56' Vela	Stadium: Fratton Park; Attendance: 20,418; Referee: Lee Mason

10 May 2009 36	Arsenal	1–4	Chelsea	London
16:00 BST	Fàbregas (yellow card) 27'; Bendtner 70'	Report	28' Alex; 39' Anelka; 49' (o.g.) Touré; 86' Malouda	Stadium: Emirates Stadium; Attendance: 60,075; Referee: Phil Dowd

16 May 2009 37	Manchester United	0–0	Arsenal	Manchester
12:45 BST		Report	(yellow card) 33' Van Persie; (yellow card) 45+2' Arshavin; (yellow card) 46' Fàbregas; (yellow card) 79' Song	Stadium: Old Trafford; Attendance: 75,468; Referee: Mike Dean

24 May 2009 38	Arsenal	4–1	Stoke City	London
16:00 BST	Denílson (yellow card) 4'; Beattie 10' (o.g.); Van Persie 16' (pen.), 41'; Diaby 18'	Report	31' (pen.) Fuller	Stadium: Emirates Stadium; Attendance: 60,082; Referee: Martin Atkinson

=== UEFA Champions League ===
==== Third qualifying round ====
13 August 2008 First leg	Twente (Netherlands)	0–2	(England) Arsenal	Arnhem, Netherlands
19:45 BST	Janssen (yellow card) 22'	Report	(yellow card) 54' Denílson; 63' Gallas; (yellow card) 67' Van Persie; 82' Adebayor	Stadium: Gelredome; Attendance: 20,000; Referee: Alberto Undiano Mallenco (Spain)

27 August 2008 Second leg	Arsenal (England)	4–0 (6 – 0 agg.)	(Netherlands) Twente	London, England
20:05 BST	Nasri 27'; Gallas 52'; Walcott 66'; Clichy (yellow card) 77'; Bendtner 89'	Report	(yellow card) 25' Wielaert; (yellow card) 33' Braafheid; (yellow card) 40' Tioté	Stadium: Emirates Stadium; Attendance: 59,583; Referee: Terje Hauge (Norway)

==== Group stage ====
Pos	Team	Pld	W	D	L	GF	GA	GD	Pts	Qualification
1	(Portugal) Porto	6	4	0	2	9	8	+1	12	Advance to knockout phase
2	(England) Arsenal	6	3	2	1	11	5	+6	11	Advance to knockout phase
3	(Ukraine) Dynamo Kyiv	6	2	2	2	4	4	0	8	Transfer to UEFA Cup
4	(Turkey) Fenerbahçe	6	0	2	4	4	11	−7	2	

Source: RSSSF

17 September 2008 1	Dynamo Kyiv (Ukraine)	1–1	(England) Arsenal	Kyiv, Ukraine
20:45 CET	Nesmachniy (yellow card) 57'; Bangoura 64' (pen.) (yellow card) 71'; Vukojević (yellow card) 82'; Diakhaté (yellow card) 90'	Report	(yellow card) 64' Sagna; 88' Gallas	Stadium: Lobanovsky Dynamo Stadium; Attendance: 16,800; Referee: Luis Medina Cantalejo (Spain)

30 September 2008 2	Arsenal (England)	4–0	(Portugal) Porto	London, England
19:45 BST	Van Persie 31', 48'; Adebayor 40', 71' (pen.); Clichy (yellow card) 75'	Report	(yellow card) 83' Costa	Stadium: Emirates Stadium; Attendance: 59,623; Referee: Herbert Fandel (Germany)

21 October 2008 3	Fenerbahçe (Turkey)	2–5	(England) Arsenal	Istanbul, Turkey
20:45 CET	Silvestre 19' (o.g.); Şahin (yellow card) 29'; Lugano (yellow card) 48'; Güiza 78'; Şentürk (yellow card) 88'	Report	10' Adebayor; 11' Walcott; (yellow card) 18', (goal) 49' Song; 22' (yellow card) 22' Diaby; 90+4' Ramsey	Stadium: Şükrü Saracoğlu Stadium; Attendance: 42,619; Referee: Peter Fröjdfeldt (Sweden)

5 November 2008 4	Arsenal (England)	0–0	(Turkey) Fenerbahçe	London, England
19:45 GMT	Djourou (yellow card) 22'; Van Persie (yellow card) 75'	Report	(yellow card) 19' Şahin; (yellow card) 47' Lugano; (yellow card) 72' Vederson	Stadium: Emirates Stadium; Attendance: 60,003; Referee: Roberto Rosetti (Italy)

25 November 2008 5	Arsenal (England)	1–0	(Ukraine) Dynamo Kyiv	London, England
19:45 GMT	Van Persie (yellow card) 34'; Bendtner 87', (yellow card) 87'	Report	(yellow card) 17' Milevskyi; (yellow card) 32' Asatiani; (yellow card) 50' (red card) 89' Aliyev	Stadium: Emirates Stadium; Attendance: 59,374; Referee: Alain Hamer (Luxembourg)

10 December 2008 6	Porto (Portugal)	2–0	(England) Arsenal	Porto, Portugal
20:45 CET	Alves 39'; L. González (yellow card) 51'; López 54'	Report	(yellow card) 52' Eboué	Stadium: Estádio do Dragão; Attendance: 37,602; Referee: Kyros Vassaras (Greece)

==== Knockout phase ====
===== Round of 16 =====
24 February 2009 First leg	Arsenal (England)	1–0	(Italy) Roma	London, England
19:45 GMT	Van Persie 37' (pen.); Touré (yellow card) 46'; Nasri (yellow card) 65'	Report	(yellow card) 13' Mexès; (yellow card) 25' Brighi; (yellow card) 42' De Rossi	Stadium: Emirates Stadium; Attendance: 60,003; Referee: Claus Bo Larsen (Denmark)

11 March 2009 Second leg	Roma (Italy)	1–0 (a.e.t.) (1 – 1 agg.) (6 – 7 p)	(England) Arsenal	Rome, Italy
20:45 CET	Juan 9'; Pizarro (yellow card) 28'; Motta (yellow card) 88'	Report	(yellow card) 49' Diaby	Stadium: Stadio Olimpico; Attendance: 62,383; Referee: Manuel Mejuto González (Spain)
	Penalties
	Pizarro (penalty scored); Vučinić (penalty missed); Baptista (penalty scored); Montella (penalty scored); Totti (penalty scored); Aquilani (penalty scored); Riise (penalty scored); Tonetto (penalty missed)		Eduardo (penalty missed); Van Persie (penalty scored); Walcott (penalty scored); Nasri (penalty scored); Denílson (penalty scored); Touré (penalty scored); Sagna (penalty scored); Diaby (penalty scored)

===== Quarter-finals =====
7 April 2009 First leg	Villarreal (Spain)	1–1	(England) Arsenal	Villarreal, Spain
20:45 CET	Senna 10'	Report	(yellow card) 39' Song; (yellow card) 45' Fàbregas; 66', (yellow card) 44'Adebayor; (yellow card) 88' Nasri	Stadium: Estadio El Madrigal; Attendance: 21,577; Referee: Tom Henning Øvrebø (Norway)

15 April 2009 Second leg	Arsenal (England)	3–0 (4 – 1 agg.)	(Spain) Villarreal	London, England
19:45 BST	Walcott 10'; Silvestre (yellow card) 30'; Adebayor 60'; Van Persie 69' (pen.)	Report	(yellow card) 51' Cani; (yellow card) 44' (yellow-red card) 67' Eguren	Stadium: Emirates Stadium; Attendance: 59,233; Referee: Wolfgang Stark (Germany)

===== Semi-finals =====
29 April 2009 First leg	Manchester United (England)	1–0	(England) Arsenal	Manchester, England
19:45 BST	O'Shea 18'; Tevez (yellow card) 32'	Report		Stadium: Old Trafford; Attendance: 74,733; Referee: Claus Bo Larsen (Denmark)

5 May 2009 Second leg	Arsenal (England)	1–3 (1 – 4 agg.)	(England) Manchester United	London, England
19:45 BST	Nasri (yellow card) 69'; Van Persie 76' (pen.); Adebayor (yellow card) 81'; Eboué (yellow card) 86'	Report	8' Park; 11', 61' Ronaldo; (red card) 74' Fletcher	Stadium: Emirates Stadium; Attendance: 59,867; Referee: Roberto Rosetti (Italy)

=== FA Cup ===
3 January 2009 R3	Arsenal	3–1	Plymouth Argyle	London
15:00 GMT	Van Persie 47', 84'; Bendtner 49' (yellow card) 22'	Report	(yellow card) 45', (goal) 53' Duguid	Stadium: Emirates Stadium; Attendance: 59,424; Referee: Mike Jones

25 January 2009 R4	Cardiff City	0–0	Arsenal	Cardiff
13:30 GMT		Report	(yellow card) 42' Eboué; (yellow card) 90' Van Persie	Stadium: Ninian Park; Attendance: 20,079; Referee: Martin Atkinson

16 February 2009 R4 Replay	Arsenal	4–0	Cardiff City	London
19:45 GMT	Eduardo 20', 60' (pen.); Bendtner 34'; Gallas (yellow card) 50'; Van Persie 89'	Report		Stadium: Emirates Stadium; Attendance: 57,237; Referee: Mark Halsey

8 March 2009 R5	Arsenal	3–0	Burnley	London
13:30 GMT	Vela 24'; Eduardo 51'; Eboué 84'	Report	(yellow card) 49' K. McDonald	Stadium: Emirates Stadium; Attendance: 57,454; Referee: Chris Foy

17 March 2009 R6	Arsenal	2–1	Hull City	London
19:45 GMT	Van Persie 74'; Gallas (yellow card) 22', (goal) 84'; Nasri (yellow card) 90+5'	Report	12' Barmby; (yellow card) 46' Halmosi; (yellow card) 62' Myhill; (yellow card) 66' Dawson; (yellow card) 78' France; (yellow card) 79' Manucho	Stadium: Emirates Stadium; Attendance: 55,641; Referee: Mike Riley

18 April 2009 Semi-finals	Arsenal	1–2	Chelsea	London
17:15 BST	Walcott 18'; Denílson (yellow card) 72'; Touré (yellow card) 87'	Report	34' Malouda; (yellow card) 38' Ivanović; (yellow card) 43' Ballack; 84', (yellow card) 85' Drogba	Stadium: Wembley Stadium; Attendance: 88,103; Referee: Martin Atkinson

=== Football League Cup ===
23 September 2008 Third round	Arsenal	6–0	Sheffield United	London
19:45 BST	Bendtner 31', 42'; Vela 44', 49', 86'; Wilshere 57'	Report	(yellow card) 62' Halford	Stadium: Emirates Stadium; Attendance: 56,632; Referee: Phil Dowd

11 November 2008 Fourth round	Arsenal	3–0	Wigan Athletic	London
19:45 GMT	Simpson 43', 68'; Ramsey (yellow card) 69'; Vela 71'	Report		Stadium: Emirates Stadium; Attendance: 59,665; Referee: Steve Tanner

2 December 2008 Quarter-finals	Burnley	2–0	Arsenal	Burnley
19:45 GMT	McDonald 6', 57'	Report	(yellow card) 46' Randall; (yellow card) 90' Mérida	Stadium: Turf Moor; Attendance: 19,045; Referee: Andre Marriner

== Pre-season ==
19 July 2008 Friendly	Barnet	1–2	Arsenal	London
15:00 BST	Gillet 16'	Report	Simpson 64'; Barazite 73'	Stadium: Underhill Stadium; Attendance: 5,358

22 July 2008 Friendly	Szombathelyi Haladás (Hungary)	1–1	(England) Arsenal	Szombathely, Hungary
18:30 CEST	Kenesei 24'	Report	Walcott 42'	Stadium: Rohonci Street Stadium; Attendance: 13,000

28 July 2008 Friendly	Burgenland XI (Austria)	2–10	(England) Arsenal	Burgenland, Austria
18:30 CEST	Foric 73'; Martna 90'	Report	Wilshere 1', 65' (pen.); Bendtner 14', 19', 30', 37'; Vela 25', 33', 52'; Walcott 69'	Stadium: Ritzing; Attendance: 3,200

30 July 2008 Friendly	VfB Stuttgart (Germany)	1–3	(England) Arsenal	Stuttgart, Germany
20:15 CEST	Baştürk 51'	Report	Vela 58'; Bendtner 65'; Wilshere 73'; Djourou (yellow card)	Stadium: Mercedes-Benz Arena

2 August 2008 Emirates Cup	Arsenal (England)	0–1	(Italy) Juventus	London
16:15 BST	Djourou (yellow card)	Report	Trezeguet 38'; Chiellini (yellow card)	Stadium: Emirates Stadium; Referee: Peter Walton

3 August 2008 Emirates Cup	Arsenal (England)	1–0	(Spain) Real Madrid	London
16:15 BST	Adebayor 49' (pen.); Eboué (yellow card)	Report	Guti (yellow card)	Stadium: Emirates Stadium; Attendance: 60,081; Referee: Mark Clattenburg

6 August 2008 Friendly	Huddersfield Town	1–2	Arsenal	Huddersfield
19:00 BST	Berrett 75'	Report	Watt 79'; Barazite 87'	Stadium: Galpharm Stadium; Attendance: 19,044

8 August 2008 Amsterdam Tournament	Ajax (Netherlands)	2–3	(England) Arsenal	Amsterdam, Netherlands
21:15 CEST	Suárez 34'; Huntelaar 36'; Gabri (yellow card)	Report	Adebayor 66', 83'; Bendtner 73'; Gallas (yellow card); Fàbregas (yellow card)	Stadium: Amsterdam Arena; Attendance: 50,000; Referee: Eric Braamhaar

9 August 2008 Amsterdam Tournament	Arsenal (England)	1–1	(Spain) Sevilla	Amsterdam, Netherlands
19:00 CEST	Vela 4'; Senderos (yellow card); Randall (yellow card)	Report	Chevantón 79', (yellow card)	Stadium: Amsterdam Arena; Referee: Ruud Bossen

Last updated: 9 August
Source: Arsenal FC

== See also ==
- 2008–09 in English football
- List of Arsenal F.C. seasons
