= Amaury Bischoff =

Footballer (born 1987)

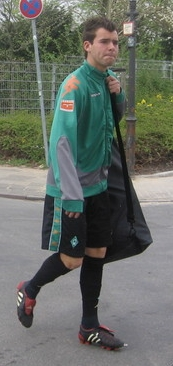
- Bischoff training with Werder Bremen in 2007

Personal information
- Full name: Amaury Armindo Bischoff
- Date of birth: 31 March 1987 (age 39)
- Place of birth: Colmar, France
- Height: 1.77 m (5 ft 10 in)
- Position: Central midfielder

Youth career
- Colmar
- 2004–2005: Strasbourg

Senior career*
Years	Team	Apps	(Gls)
2005–2008	Werder Bremen II	62	(6)
2006–2008	Werder Bremen	0	(0)
2008–2009	Arsenal	1	(0)
2009–2011	Académica	10	(0)
2010	→ Aves (loan)	10	(1)
2011–2012	Aves	20	(1)
2012–2017	Preußen Münster	142	(30)
2017–2019	Hansa Rostock	51	(2)
2019–2021	Bahlinger SC	29	(3)
2021–2023	Colmar	18	(0)
Total		343	(43)

International career
- France U18
2009	Portugal U21	1	(1)
- * Club domestic league appearances and goals

Amaury Armindo Bischoff (born 31 March 1987) is a former professional footballer who played as a central midfielder.

After starting out at Werder Bremen, he went on to spend most of his career in Germany, mainly with Preußen Münster. He also had a one-year spell in England, with Arsenal.

Born in France, Bischoff represented both that country and Portugal at youth level.

== Club career ==
=== Early years ===
Born in Colmar, Haut-Rhin to a French father – from Alsace – and a Portuguese mother, Bischoff began his football career at SR Colmar, finishing his development at Strasbourg. Aged 18, he moved to Germany and signed for Werder Bremen, going on to spend the majority of his spell with the reserve side but training with the main squad several times.

On 14 March 2007, Bischoff made his debut for Werder's first team, coming on as a substitute for Diego in the 74th minute of a 2–0 home win against Celta in that season's UEFA Cup (3–0 on aggregate). It would be his only official game for the club.

=== Arsenal ===
Bischoff left Werder Bremen on 1 July 2008, after rejecting a contract extension. Shortly after, he made a statement in which he said that his transfer to Arsenal was imminent; it was subsequently confirmed on 30 July, with manager Arsène Wenger stating he knew the signing was a "gamble on talent" due to the player's injury record.

Bischoff made his debut in an Arsenal shirt on 6 October 2008, in a reserve match against Stoke City, making his first appearance with the first team on 11 November in a 3–0 home victory over Wigan Athletic in the fourth round of the League Cup, coming on as a substitute in the 77th minute. He made two more in the domestic cups for the main squad, both as a substitute: the 2–0 League Cup loss at Burnley in December 2008, and the 4–0 defeat of Cardiff City in the FA Cup.

On 2 May 2009, Bischoff played his first and only game in the Premier League, replacing Theo Walcott in the 64th minute of the side's 3–0 away victory against Portsmouth. He was released by the Gunners when his contract expired on 30 June, having been unable to break into the first team.

=== Portugal ===
On 26 August 2009, Bischoff signed with Académica in Portugal, on a two-year deal. He made his Primeira Liga debut on 2 October in a 2–4 home defeat to Marítimo, starting and being replaced at half-time. It would be one of only four competitive appearances during the season, which he finished on loan to Segunda Liga side Aves.

On 30 June 2011, after declining all offers to renew his contract, Bischoff left Coimbra. He joined his former club Aves shortly after, for two years.

=== Preußen Münster ===
Bischoff returned to Germany in summer 2012, going on to spend several seasons in the 3. Liga with Preußen Münster and eventually becoming captain. In 2012–13, he scored a career-best ten goals to help his team to the fourth position.

At the start of the 2016–17 campaign, Bischoff requested permission to be removed from the Preußenstadion-based squad, as his mind was not "in the game".

=== Hansa Rostock ===
On 21 January 2017, Bischoff signed a two-and-a-half-year deal with Hansa Rostock also in the German second division. In June 2019, it was announced he would leave the club after having chosen not to accept an offer of a contract extension.

=== Later career ===
Bischoff joined Bahlinger SC of the Regionalliga Südwest on 5 August 2019, on a two-year contract. He returned to France and Colmar 17 years after leaving in June 2021, aged 34.

Bischoff retired in summer 2023.

== International career ==
Bischoff started representing France at under-18 level. However, on 14 May 2007, he chose to play for Portugal.

On 10 February 2009, in his debut with the Portugal under-21s (ultimately his only appearance), Bischoff opened a 3–1 friendly win against Switzerland in the fourth minute.

== Career statistics ==
Appearances and goals by club, season and competition
Club	Season	League			National cup		League cup		Europe		Total	
Club	Season	Division	Apps	Goals	Apps	Goals	Apps	Goals	Apps	Goals	Apps	Goals
Werder Bremen II	2005–06	Regionalliga Nord	34	4	—		—		—		34	4
Werder Bremen II	2006–07	Regionalliga Nord	27	2	—		—		—		27	2
Werder Bremen II	2007–08	Regionalliga Nord	1	0	—		—		—		1	0
Werder Bremen II	Total		62	6	—		—		—		62	6
Werder Bremen	2006–07	Bundesliga	0	0	0	0	—		1 (Note: Appearance in UEFA Cup)	0	1	0
Arsenal	2008–09	Premier League	1	0	1	0	2	0	0	0	4	0
Aves	2009–10	Segunda Liga	10	1	0	0	0	0	—		10	1
Académica	2009–10	Primeira Liga	1	0	0	0	3	0	—		4	0
Académica	2010–11	Primeira Liga	9	0	5	2	1	0	—		15	2
Académica	Total		10	0	5	2	4	0	0	0	19	2
Aves	2011–12	Segunda Liga	20	1	3	1	0	0	—		23	2
Preußen Münster	2012–13	3. Liga	34	10	2	0	—		—		36	10
Preußen Münster	2013–14	3. Liga	29	3	1	0	—		—		29	3
Preußen Münster	2014–15	3. Liga	34	10	0	0	—		—		34	10
Preußen Münster	2015–16	3. Liga	32	4	—		—		—		32	4
Preußen Münster	2016–17	3. Liga	13	3	—		—		—		13	3
Preußen Münster	Total		142	30	3	0	—		0	0	145	30
Hansa Rostock	2016–17	3. Liga	14	1	0	0	—		—		14	1
Hansa Rostock	2017–18	3. Liga	23	1	1	0	—		—		24	1
Hansa Rostock	2018–19	3. Liga	14	0	0	0	—		—		14	0
Hansa Rostock	Total		51	2	1	0	—		0	0	52	2
Bahlinger SC	2019–20	3. Liga	15	2	0	0	—		—		15	1
Bahlinger SC	2020–21	3. Liga	14	1	0	0	—		—		14	1
Bahlinger SC	Total		29	3	0	0	—		0	0	29	3
Colmar	2021–22	Championnat National 3	14	0	0	0	—		—		14	0
Colmar	2022–23	Championnat National 2	4	0	0	0	—		—		4	0
Colmar	Total		18	0	0	0	—		0	0	18	0
Career total			343	43	13	3	6	0	1	0	363	46
