= Gary Lewin =

English physiotherapist (born 1964)

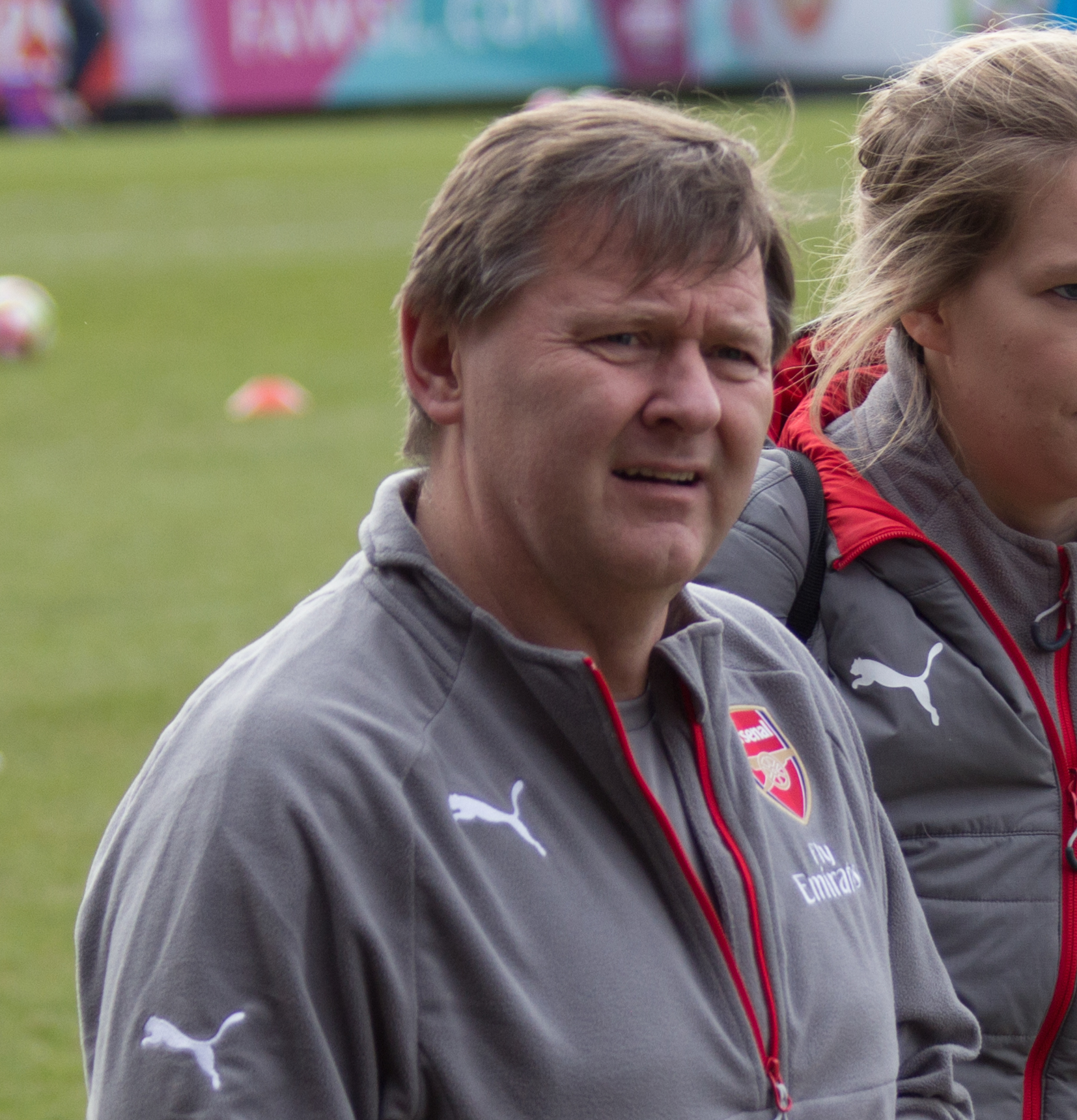
- Lewin in 2017
- Born: Gary Lewin; 16 May 1964 (age 62); East Ham, London
- Education: BSc (hons) Dip Phys, MCSP, SRP
- Alma mater: Guy's Hospital (1983–1986)
- Occupation: Physiotherapist

Gary Lewin (born 16 May 1964) is an English physiotherapist who has worked with football clubs Arsenal and West Ham United, and the England national team. Lewin was the head physiotherapist at Arsenal for a total of 22 years. He held a similar position from 1996 with England, and from 2008 to 2017 assumed the post of England's Senior Head of Physiotherapy. He was Head of Medical Services for West Ham between May 2017 and May 2018.

== Biography ==
Lewin joined Arsenal as a young goalkeeper aged 16 in 1980. After a one-year spell at Barnet he became reserve-team physio at the age of 19. He trained at Guy's Hospital School of Physiotherapy from 1983 to 1986, before returning to Arsenal in 1986 as first -team physiotherapist. Lewin has gone on to attain a BSc (hons) in Biology and a Diploma in Physiotherapy. He is also a Member of the College of Sports Physiotherapists, and is a State Registered Physiotherapist.

Lewin was called into action in 1989 where he almost had to break David Rocastle's jaw as he swallowed his tongue so as to perform life-saving treatment. He went on to become an expert on hamstring injuries, due to his experiences with Tony Adams, and advised Birmingham City's physio's on the treatment of often-injured midfielder David Dunn.

During the 2007 Football League Cup Final on 25 February 2007, Lewin was close to the incident where Chelsea skipper John Terry was hit in the face by Abou Diaby's foot during a corner in the Arsenal penalty area. Terry swallowed his tongue and Lewin was the first physio to assist Terry, possibly saving his life. Lewin was credited by former Arsenal striker Eduardo da Silva with saving his foot and career after a broken leg suffered on 23 February 2008.

Lewin was first-team physio at Arsenal for 22 years, and also from 1996 onwards with the England national team as well. His time at Arsenal came to an end when he was appointed by the Football Association to be England's Head of Physiotherapy from 1 August 2008.

Following Lewin's switch to the full-time England job, his cousin Colin Lewin took over at Arsenal.

During England's first game of the 2014 FIFA World Cup in Brazil, against Italy, Lewin was stretchered off. During the celebrations for the equalising goal by Daniel Sturridge, Lewin jumped up and slipped on some synthetic turf, and was later diagnosed with a dislocation to his left ankle and from that dislocation he fractured the fibula in two places, fractured the back of the tibia and also ruptured the ligaments.

On 20 March 2017, Lewin rejoined Arsenal as physiotherapist for the women's team.

On 30 May 2017, Lewin was appointed as the Head of Medical Services at West Ham United. He left the club following the appointment for Manuel Pellegrini as manager at the end of the 2017–18 season.

== Personal life ==
Lewin is an ambassador of the Brain & Spine Foundation, the only UK wide charity providing medical information and emotional support on the full range of neurological conditions.
