= Gâdinți =

- Commune
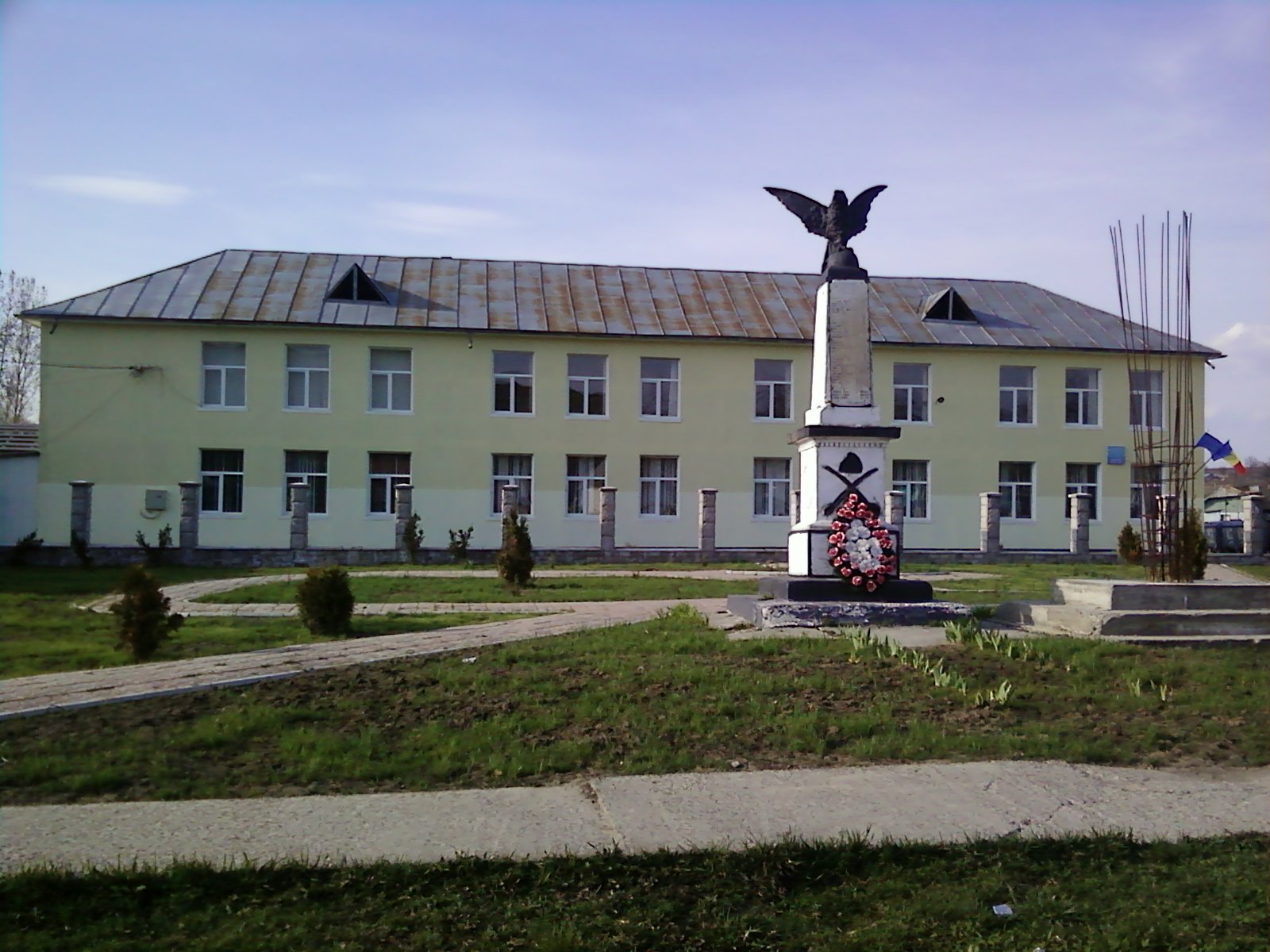
- The school and the monument

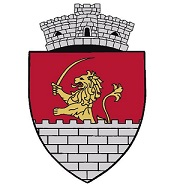
- Coat of arms

- Location in Neamț County

- Location in Romania
- Coordinates: 46°56′N 27°1′E
- Country: Romania
- County: Neamț

Government
  - Mayor (2020–2024): Vasile Băbuță (PSD)
- Area: 43.29 km^{2} (16.71 sq mi)
- Elevation: 198 m (650 ft)
- Population (2021-12-01): 1,873
  - Density: 43.27/km^{2} (112.1/sq mi)
- Time zone: UTC+02:00 (EET)
  - Summer (DST): UTC+03:00 (EEST)
- Postal code: 617396
- Area code: +(40) 233
- Vehicle reg.: NT
- Website: gadinti.ro

Gâdinți is a commune in Neamț County, Western Moldavia, Romania. It is composed of a single village, Gâdinți. This was part of Sagna Commune until 2004, when it was split off.

Historical population
Year	Pop.	±%
1992	2,195	—
2002	2,508	+14.3%
2011	1,983	−20.9%
2021	1,873	−5.5%
Source: Census data
