= Bacary Sagna =

French footballer (born 1983)

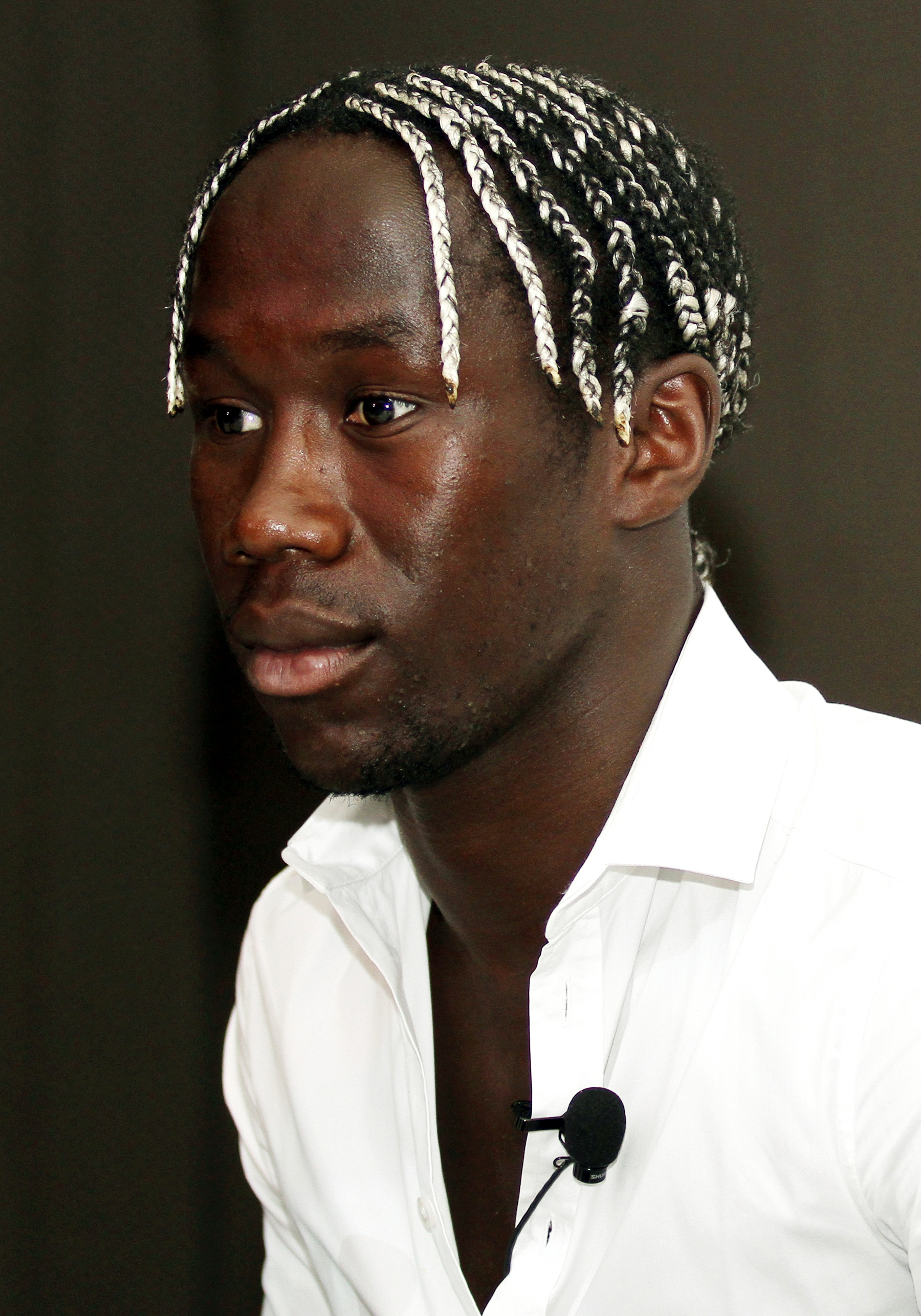
- Sagna in 2012

Personal information
- Full name: Bacary Sagna
- Date of birth: 14 February 1983 (age 43)
- Place of birth: Sens, France
- Height: 1.76 m (5 ft 9 in)
- Position: Right-back

Team information
- Current team: Banaat FC (head coach)

Youth career
- 1992–1997: Sens
- 1997–2002: Auxerre

Senior career*
Years	Team	Apps	(Gls)
2002–2004	Auxerre B	37	(3)
2004–2007	Auxerre	87	(0)
2007–2014	Arsenal	213	(4)
2014–2017	Manchester City	54	(0)
2018	Benevento	13	(1)
2018–2019	Montreal Impact	35	(2)
Total		439	(10)

International career
2004–2006	France U21	13	(1)
2007–2016	France	65	(0)

Managerial career
- 2025–: Banaat FC
Medal record
Men's football
Representing France
UEFA European Championship
Runner-up	2016 France
- * Club domestic league appearances and goals

Bacary Sagna (born 14 February 1983) is a French former professional footballer who played as a right-back.

Sagna's former manager at Arsenal, Arsène Wenger, once described him as the best right-back in the Premier League. In addition to him regularly featuring as a full-back, he played as a centre-back for Arsenal on several occasions.

Sagna began his career at Auxerre, before being transferred to Arsenal for £7 million in 2007. In 2014, shortly after winning the FA Cup, his first trophy at the club, he made a move to Manchester City.

A French international from 2007 to 2016, Sagna played at the 2010 and 2014 editions of the FIFA World Cup, in addition to UEFA Euro 2016 at home.

== Club career ==
=== Sens ===
Sagna started his career at FC Sens. He played for their youth team until 1998.

=== Auxerre ===
In 1998, he moved to AJ Auxerre's youth team. Eventually, he was promoted to the first team and he made 87 Ligue 1 appearances for them. He was part of the squad that won the Coupe de France in 2005. He also played in the UEFA Cup in each of his three seasons with the club's first team, making a total of 17 appearances in the competition. He was also voted into the Ligue 1 team of the season for his outstanding displays at the right back position. He played in the same Auxerre team as Abou Diaby, a future Arsenal teammate, and Watford centre-back Younès Kaboul. Sagna established himself as one of the best full backs of the French top tier and thus became dubbed "Mr. Reliable" by the club's fans. He also won Auxerre's Player of the Year award for the 2006–07 season.

=== Arsenal ===
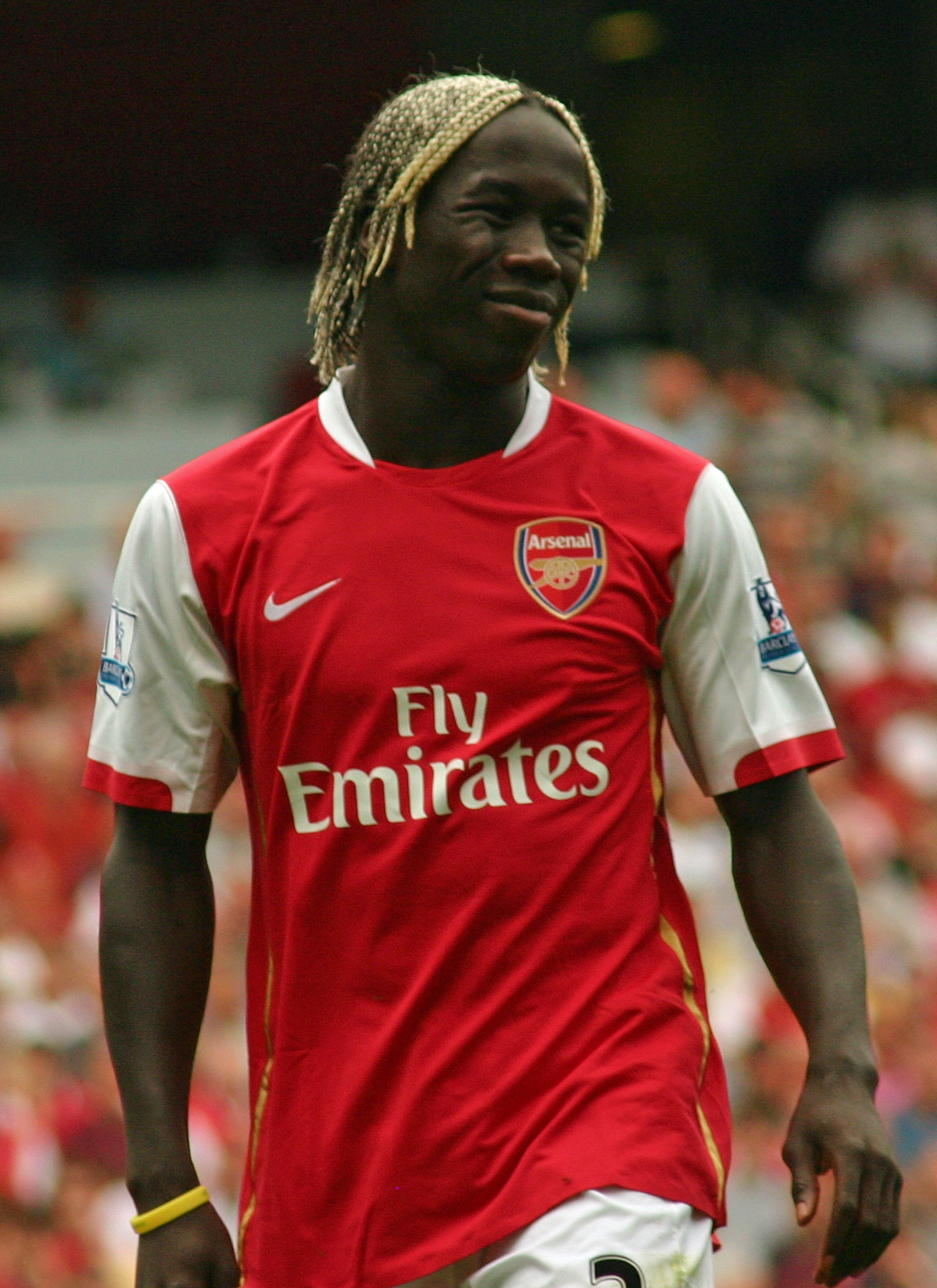
Sagna playing for Arsenal in the 2007–08 season

==== 2007–08 season ====
On 12 July 2007, Sagna completed a move to Arsenal from Auxerre for an undisclosed fee, thought to have been an initial €9 million that could have risen to €11 million. He was given the number 3 shirt, previously worn by former defender Ashley Cole.

Sagna made his debut for Arsenal on 19 July 2007 as a starter in the squad that beat Turkish club Gençlerbirliği 3–0 in a friendly at Austria's Bad Waltersdorf Stadion.

On 13 February 2008, exactly one week before Arsenal were set to play the second leg of their round of 16 encounter against Milan in the Champions League, Sagna's older brother, Omar Sagna, died at the age of 28, one day before his birthday. He, however, did play the match after he was advised to by his father. Arsenal went on to win the second leg 0–2 with the same scoreline on aggregate.

On 23 March, Sagna tallied his first Premier League goal off a low header from a corner kick to give Arsenal a 1–0 lead against London rivals Chelsea at Stamford Bridge, but later went off injured before Chelsea came back to win the game 2–1. At the end of the season, he was named in the PFA Team of the Year.

==== 2008–09 season ====
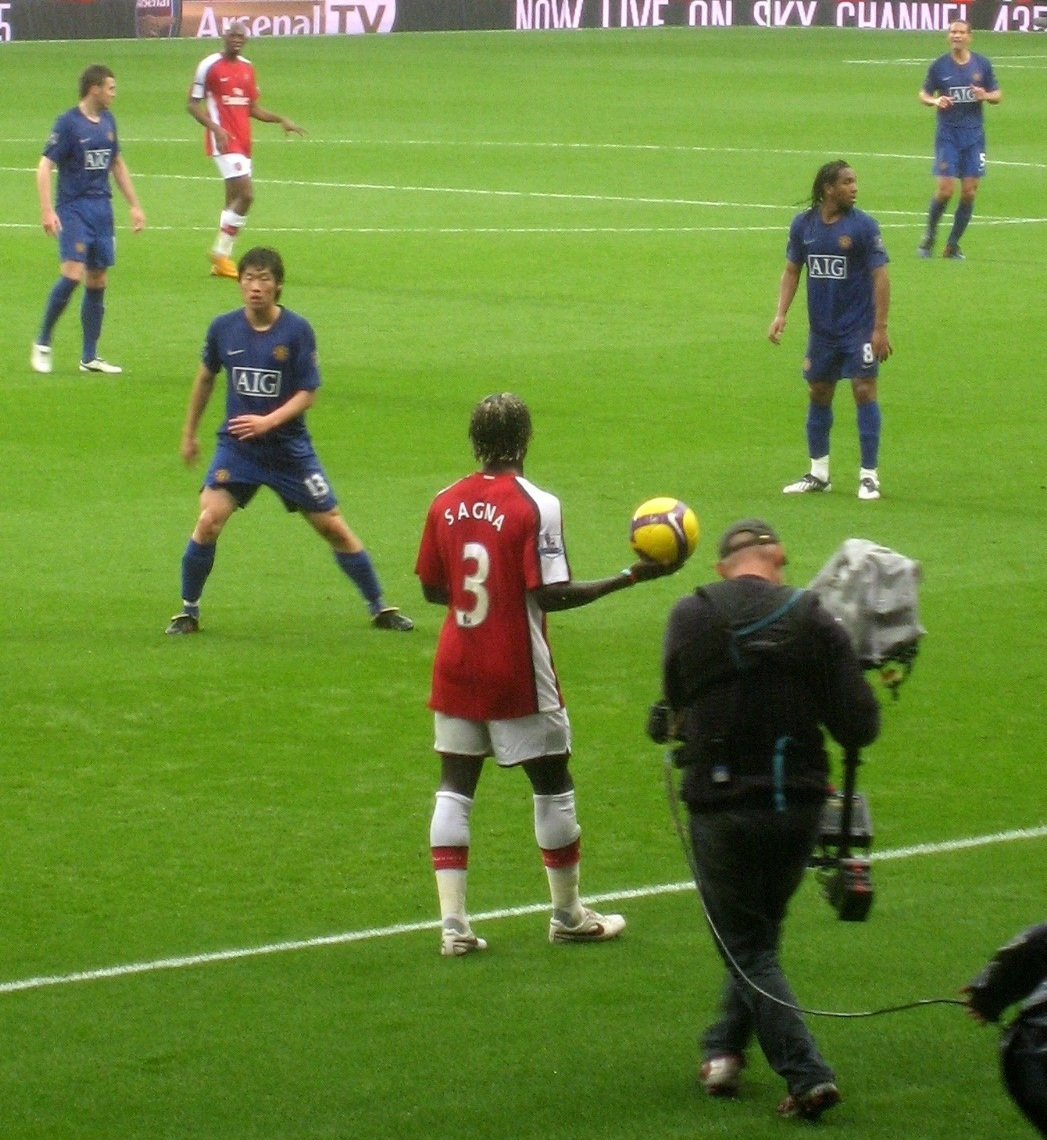
Sagna taking a throw in against Manchester United

Sagna signed a new deal with Arsenal before the start of the 2008–09 season. Arsenal signed him for a further two years, taking his contract up to 2014. Sagna stated, "I love Arsenal, it's a great club," and further added, "The manager is also very good and next season we will be fighting for all the trophies." He stunningly saved Arsenal in a 2–2 draw against Aston Villa when he jumped and kicked the ball away so that Arsenal would go into half time with the lead.

==== 2009–10 season ====
Sagna struggled to replicate his form from the previous two seasons as injuries also prevented him from contributing to the team in the same way. He provided many assists though, his most important contribution arguably being the cross to striker Nicklas Bendtner, who gave Arsenal the 1–0 lead in the 94th minute against Wolverhampton Wanderers. Despite this, however, Sagna was linked away from the club with various teams, including Serie A's Internazionale, seemingly interested in taking the defender away from London.

==== 2010–11 season ====
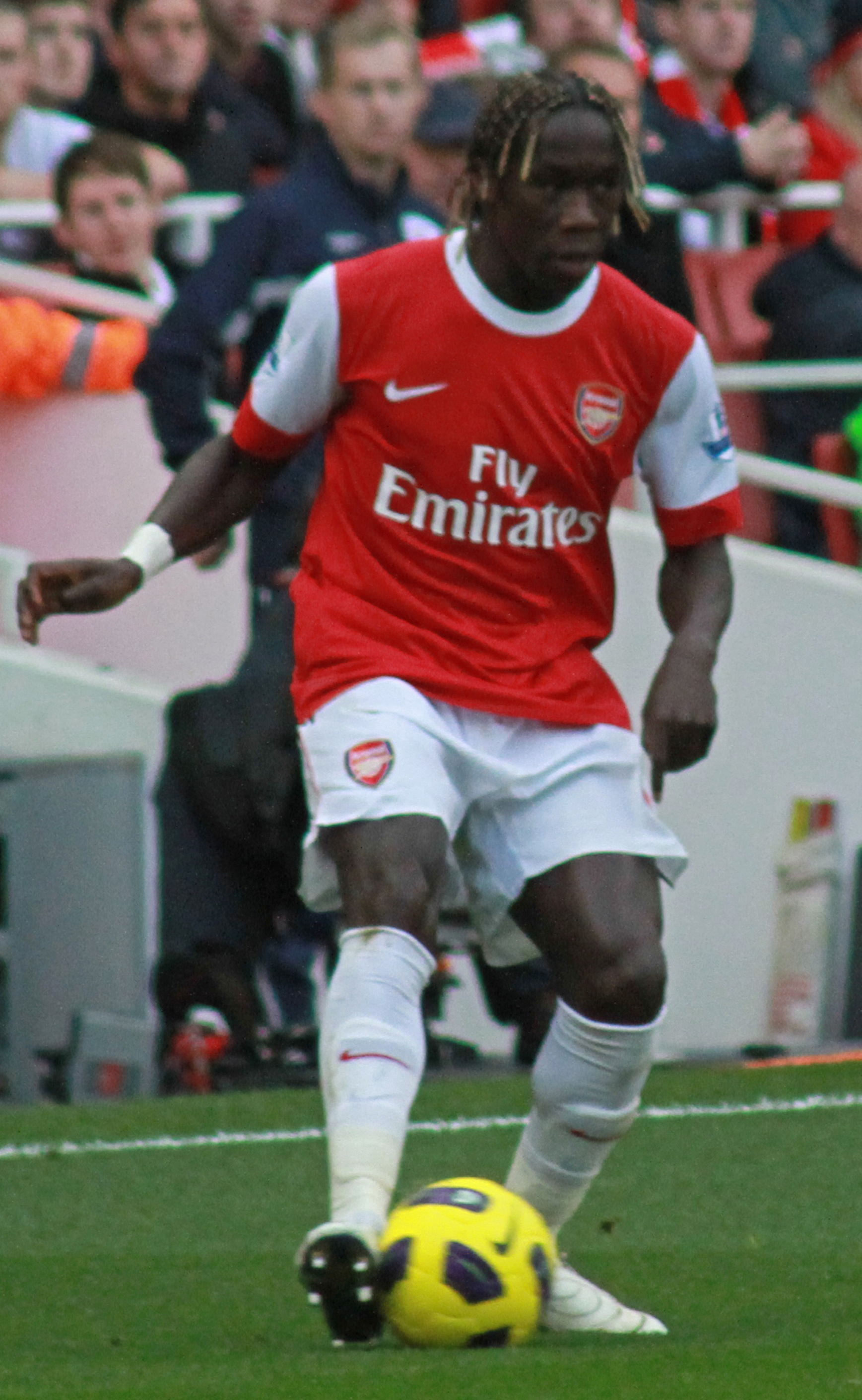
Sagna playing for Arsenal in 2010

Sagna scored his first goal at the Emirates Stadium for Arsenal against Celtic, a game in which Arsenal went on to win 3–2 and win the Emirates Cup for the second consecutive year. He made his 100th league start for Arsenal on 3 October 2010, a 2–0 defeat against Chelsea at Stamford Bridge. On 14 November, he scored only his second ever official goal for Arsenal in a 2–1 away victory against Everton at Goodison Park, with a powerful shot from the near post. On 8 December 2010, Sagna picked up his first red card in his Arsenal career in a 3–1 home victory against Serbian club Partizan in Arsenal's final Champions League group game of the season.

On 1 January 2011, in a match with Birmingham City, he was involved in an incident where Lee Bowyer stamped on him after Sagna had gone in for a tackle. Bowyer was banned by the FA for three games for the stamp. On 5 January, Sagna picked up his second red card of the season after he and Manchester City fullback Pablo Zabaleta headbutted each other in the final moments of Arsenal's 0–0 draw with City at Emirates Stadium. On 19 January, Sagna scored his second goal of the season with Arsenal's second goal in their 3–1 victory over Leeds United at Elland Road in a third round replay. This was Sagna's career best for goal-scoring, his previous best coming in the 2007–08 season where scored only once. Sagna was included in the PFA Team of the Year for his performance in the 2010–11 season.

==== 2011–12 season ====
On 13 August 2011, Sagna started and played the full 90 minutes against Newcastle United at St James' Park in a 0–0 draw on the opening day of the 2011–12 Premier League season. On Saturday 20 August, he started at left-back and played the full 90 minutes in a 2–0 defeat at the hands of a Liverpool side that picked up its first win over the Gunners away from home in 11 years. On 28 August, Sagna missed Arsenal's game against Manchester United at Old Trafford due to illness.

Sagna sustained a leg break during a match against North London rivals Tottenham Hotspur after a challenge by Benoît Assou-Ekotto forced him to land awkwardly. On 29 January 2012, Sagna came off the bench against Aston Villa as an 89th-minute substitute to mark his comeback. On 26 February 2012, he started in the North London derby against Spurs, scoring a header from a Mikel Arteta cross and inspiring Arsenal to come back from being 2–0 down to go on and win 5–2. He sustained another leg break of the same leg in the final home match of the season against Norwich City, which ruled him out of UEFA Euro 2012 in June 2012.

==== 2012–13 season ====
In October 2012, Sagna marked his return to the first team by starting in Arsenal's 1–0 victory over Queens Park Rangers. On 3 November, he started and played the full 90 minutes at right-back against Manchester United at Old Trafford, a 2–1 league defeat. In his absence with a broken leg, Carl Jenkinson started for Arsenal and earned rave reviews, but Sagna continued to be Arsenal's first-choice right back upon his return. On 9 February 2013, due to an injury to centre-back Laurent Koscielny during warm-ups, Sagna was forced to fill in as a central defender against Sunderland. He helped a ten-man Arsenal win 1–0. On 28 April 2013, Sagna committed a mistimed tackle inside the penalty box on Robin van Persie in a 1–1 home draw against Manchester United, conceding a penalty to bring the score level after a second-minute Arsenal goal from Theo Walcott.

==== 2013–14 season ====
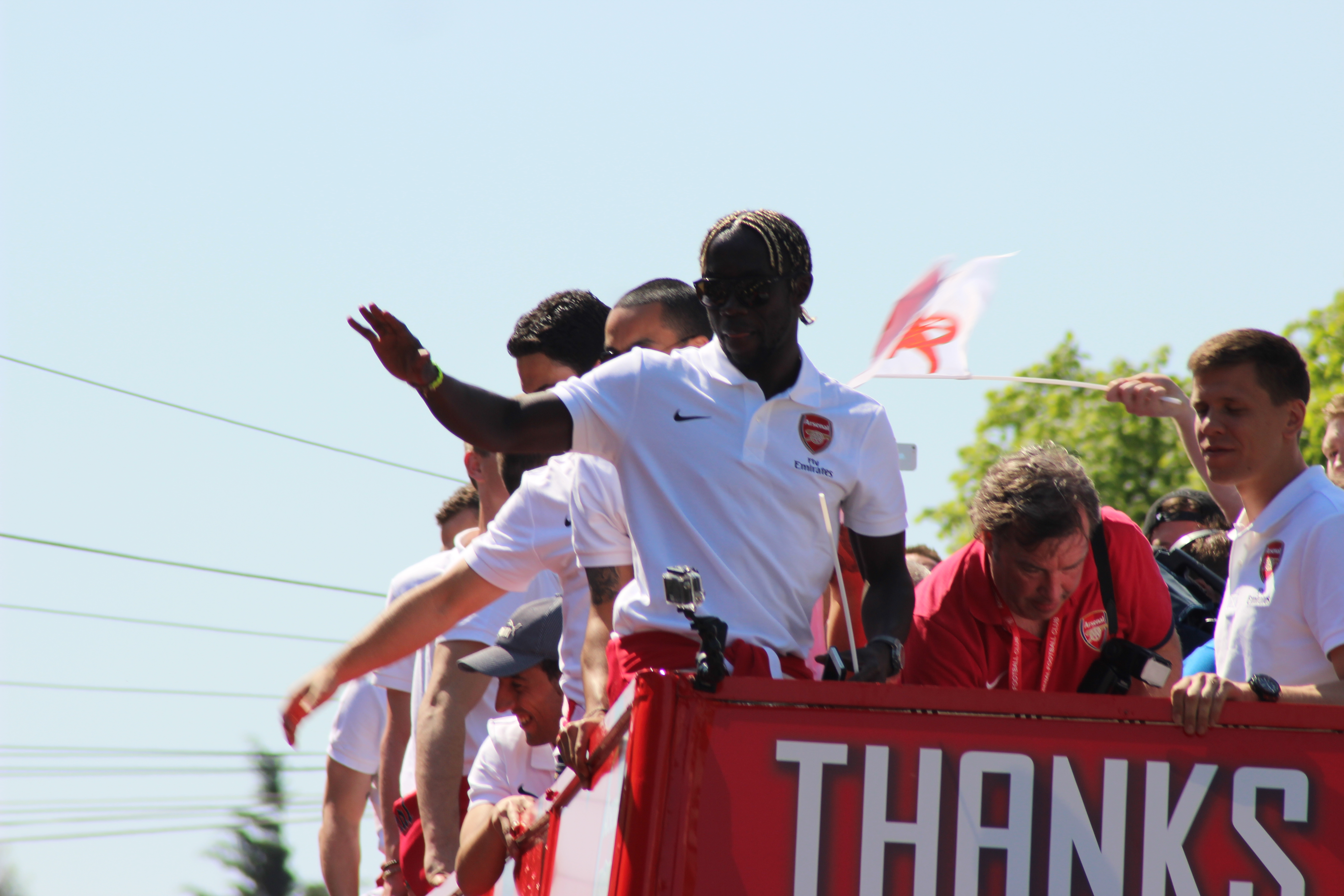
Sagna during open top bus parade after winning the FA Cup

Sagna remained Arsenal's first choice right-back at the start of the season, fighting off competition from Carl Jenkinson. He scored his first goal of the season, his fifth in Arsenal colours, against Stoke City on 22 September, heading in Mesut Özil's free-kick, securing a 3–1 win for the Gunners. On 17 May, Sagna started in the 2014 FA Cup Final as Arsenal beat Hull City 3–2 at Wembley Stadium, his first trophy at the club.

It was announced on 27 May that Sagna would not extend his contract with the Gunners, which was set to expire at the end of the season. Although Arsenal offered him a two-year extension, Sagna was believed to be "90 per cent certain" of leaving the Emirates, thus rejecting the contract extension. Additional sources understand that Manchester City and a number of top clubs in Europe had expressed an interest in signing him. Sagna said he did not sign a new deal with Arsenal because "the discussions did not go in the direction that he wanted".

=== Manchester City ===
It was announced on 13 June 2014 that Sagna had agreed to a deal with Manchester City to join the reigning Premier League champions after his contract with Arsenal was set to expire on 30 June. He was City's first signing of the summer and signed a three-year deal, taking the number 3 shirt. He left the club at the end of his contract in June 2017.

=== Benevento ===
On 3 February 2018, Sagna signed with Serie A side Benevento Calcio for six months and a year in option. On 29 April, Sagna scored his sole goal for Benevento with 90th-minute header in their 3–3 draw to Udinese.

=== Montreal Impact ===
On 8 August 2018, Sagna signed with Montreal Impact in Major League Soccer for the remainder of the 2018 season, with an option for 2019. Although the option was not taken up, Sagna subsequently signed a one-year contract to stay with the club for the 2019 season.

== International career ==
=== Youth ===
Sagna has previously represented the France under-21 team, which he also participated at the 2006 European Under-21 Championship.

At age 17, Sagna wished to join up with the Senegal national team, stating, "I wanted to play for Senegal when I was 17, but they didn't reply. So I was a bit disappointed. But when I started playing for Auxerre for the first team, they contacted me, and I had a game on the same day with the France national team under 21s, so I had to make a choice."

=== Senior ===
Sagna received his first senior international cap for France on 22 August 2007 in a friendly match against Slovakia on the road, which they won 1–0, coming on as a substitute for François Clerc after one hour of play. He went on to make his competitive debut for France in their 6–0 away win at the Faroe Islands on 13 October 2007 in the UEFA Euro 2008 qualifiers, playing all 90 minutes. It was his only appearance in the Euro 2008 qualifying. He was not a candidate to join the French team at the Euro 2008 finals in Austria and Switzerland as he was still recovering from the injury sustained in Arsenal's Premier League match at Chelsea in March 2008.

After recovering from the injury, Sagna returned to the French team for their friendly match against Sweden in August 2008, playing all 90 minutes in a 3–2 away win. He went on to become a regular in the French team's qualifying campaign for the 2010 FIFA World Cup. He was also a part of the disastrous French World Cup campaign when the team crashed out at the group stage after losing 2–1 against hosts South Africa.

Sagna missed out on UEFA Euro 2012 with a broken leg.

== Managerial career ==
On 4 January 2025, Sagna was announced as the new head coach of Banaat FC.

== Personal life ==
Bacary Sagna was born in Sens, France, to Senegalese parents. He is a Muslim. In 2010, he married French-Algerian model Ludivine Kadri with whom he already had a son named Elias (born in 2009). In 2011, Kadri gave birth to the couple's second son Kais.

His cousin Ibrahima Sonko played in England for Reading and in Turkey for Akhisar Belediyespor.

On 31 March 2011, Sagna became an ambassador for Grassroot Soccer, an international non-profit that uses the power of football to educate, inspire, and mobilise communities to stop the spread of HIV.

Sagna was called "Bac" by the majority of his teammates.

== Career statistics ==
=== Club ===
Appearances and goals by club, season and competition
Club	Season	League			National cup (Note: Includes Coupe de France, Coupe de la Ligue, FA Cup, Football League Cup/EFL Cup, FA Community Shield, Coppa Italia, Canadian Championship)		Continental (Note: Includes UEFA Champions League, UEFA Cup/UEFA Europa League, UEFA Intertoto Cup)		Total	
Club	Season	Division	Apps	Goals	Apps	Goals	Apps	Goals	Apps	Goals
Auxerre	2004–05	Ligue 1	26	0	7	0	10	0	43	0
Auxerre	2005–06	Ligue 1	23	0	3	0	1	0	27	0
Auxerre	2006–07	Ligue 1	38	0	3	0	10	0	51	0
Auxerre	Total		87	0	13	0	21	0	121	0
Arsenal	2007–08	Premier League	29	1	3	0	8	0	40	1
Arsenal	2008–09	Premier League	35	0	5	0	9	0	49	0
Arsenal	2009–10	Premier League	35	0	1	0	8	0	44	0
Arsenal	2010–11	Premier League	33	1	6	1	4	0	43	2
Arsenal	2011–12	Premier League	21	1	2	0	6	0	29	1
Arsenal	2012–13	Premier League	25	0	3	0	3	0	31	0
Arsenal	2013–14	Premier League	35	1	4	0	9	0	48	1
Arsenal	Total		213	4	24	1	47	0	284	5
Manchester City	2014–15	Premier League	9	0	3	0	4	0	16	0
Manchester City	2015–16	Premier League	28	0	6	0	11	0	45	0
Manchester City	2016–17	Premier League	17	0	3	0	5	0	25	0
Manchester City	Total		54	0	12	0	20	0	86	0
Benevento	2017–18	Serie A	13	1	—		—		13	1
Montreal Impact	2018	Major League Soccer	9	1	0	0	—		9	1
Montreal Impact	2019	Major League Soccer	26	1	5	0	—		31	1
Montreal Impact	Total		35	2	5	0	—		40	2
Career total			402	7	54	1	88	0	544	8

=== International ===
National team	Year	Apps	Goals
France
France	2007	2	0
France	2008	4	0
France	2009	10	0
France	2010	10	0
France	2011	6	0
France	2012	0	0
France	2013	6	0
France	2014	7	0
France	2015	9	0
France	2016	11	0
Total		65	0

== Honours ==
Auxerre

- Coupe de France: 2004–05

Arsenal

- FA Cup: 2013–14
- Football League Cup runner-up: 2010–11

Manchester City

- Football League Cup: 2015–16

Montreal Impact

- Canadian Championship: 2019

Individual

- UNFP Ligue 1 Team of the Year: 2006–07
- Auxerre Player of the Season: 2006–07
- PFA Team of the Year: 2007–08 Premier League, 2010–11 Premier League
