= Dharyala Sagna =

- Town
- Location within Pakistan
- Coordinates: 33.22°N 73.15°E
- Country: Pakistan
- Province: Islamabad C.T
- Elevation: 489 m (1,604 ft)
- Time zone: UTC+5 (PST)

Dharyala Sagna is a town in the Islamabad Capital Territory of Pakistan. It is located at 33° 22' N 73° 15' E with an altitude of 489 metres (1604 feet).
