= Sagna, Neamț =

Sagna
- Commune
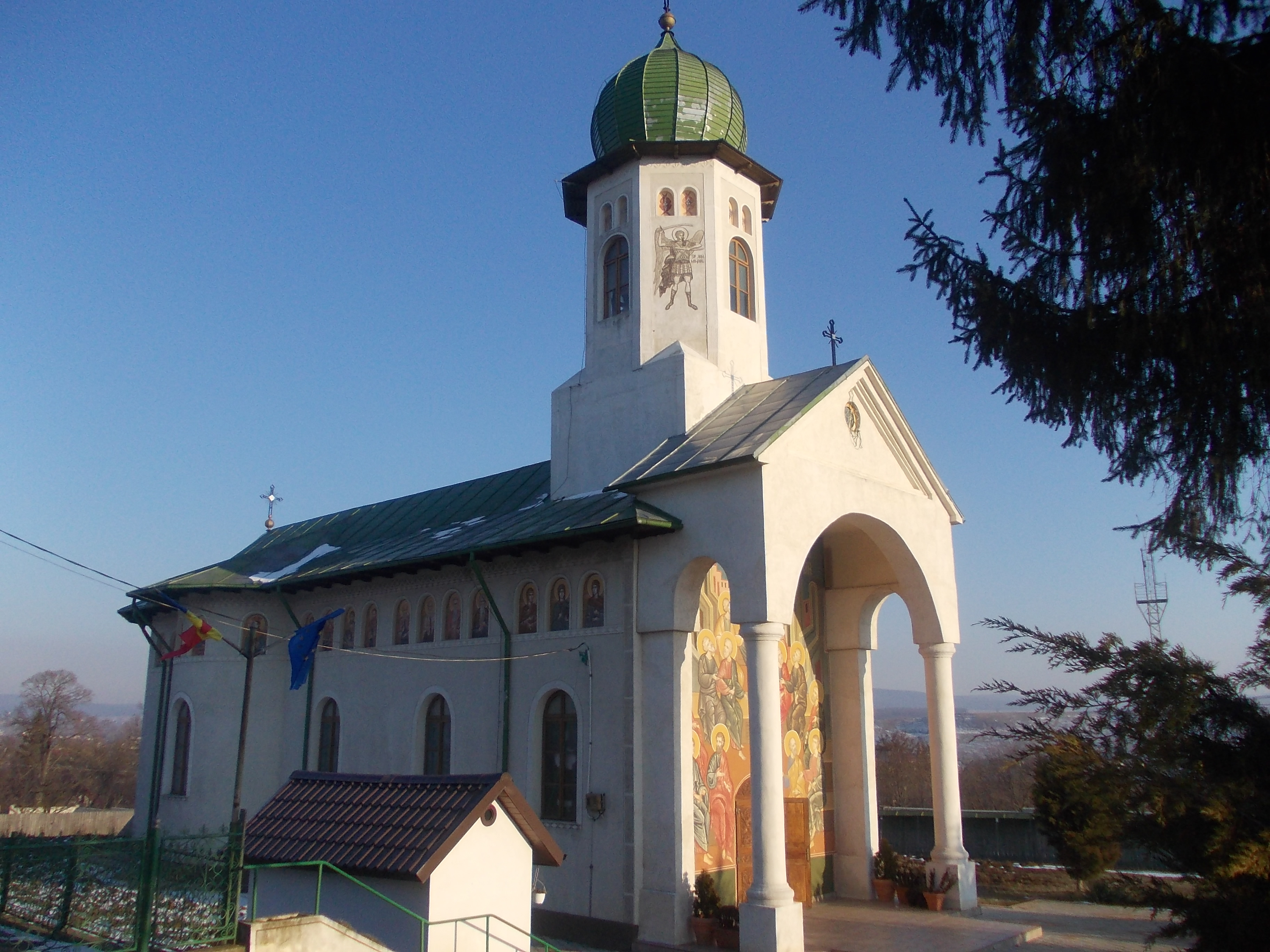
- Church in Sagna

- Location in Neamț County

- Location in Romania
- Coordinates: 46.970°N 27.008°E
- Country: Romania
- County: Neamț

Government
  - Mayor (2020–2024): Gheorghe Iacob (PSD)
- Area: 54.49 km^{2} (21.04 sq mi)
- Elevation: 205 m (673 ft)
- Population (2021-12-01): 3,975
  - Density: 72.95/km^{2} (188.9/sq mi)
- Time zone: UTC+02:00 (EET)
  - Summer (DST): UTC+03:00 (EEST)
- Postal code: 617395
- Area code: +(40) 233
- Vehicle reg.: NT
- Website: www.primariasagna.ro

Sagna is a commune in Neamț County, Western Moldavia, Romania. It is composed of three villages: Luțca, Sagna, and Vulpășești. It also included the village of Gâdinți until 2004, when it was split off to form Gâdinți Commune.

Historical population
Year	Pop.	±%
2002	4,911	—
2011	3,883	−20.9%
2021	3,975	+2.4%
Source: Census data
