= Saeid Agin Sagna =

Nigerian footballer

Personal information
- Date of birth: 1975
- Place of birth: Nigeria

Senior career*
| Years | Team | Apps | (Gls) |
| 1991–1992 | Poora | | |
| 1992–1993 | Bank Tejarat | | |
- Mohammedan
| 2006 | Sanati Kaveh | 3 | (0) |
- * Club domestic league appearances and goals

Saeid Agin Sagna (born 1975) is a Nigerian retired footballer who appeared in Iranian League between 1991 and 1993. He was son of a Nigerian embassy employee in Tehran. He is the first foreign footballer who played for Bank Tejarat and Poora, and Sanati Kaveh.
