= Abou Diaby =

French footballer (born 1986)

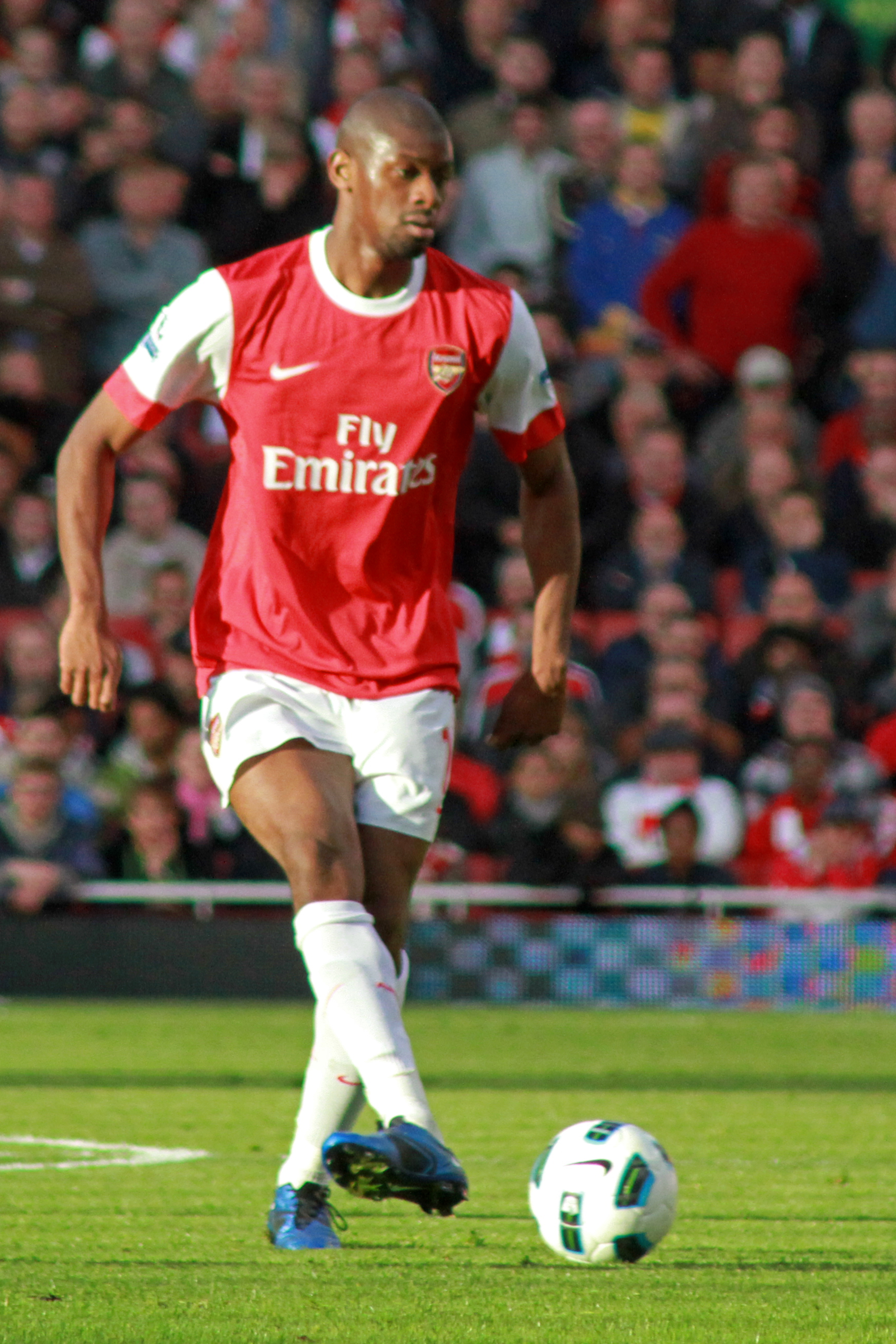
- Diaby playing for Arsenal in 2010

Personal information
- Full name: Vassiriki Abou Diaby
- Date of birth: 11 May 1986 (age 40)
- Place of birth: Paris, France
- Height: 1.92 m (6 ft 4 in)
- Position: Midfielder

Youth career
- 1994–1998: Aubervilliers
- 1998–2001: Red Star
- 2001–2002: Paris Saint-Germain
- 1999–2002: INF Clairefontaine
- 2002–2004: Auxerre

Senior career*
Years	Team	Apps	(Gls)
2004–2006	Auxerre	10	(1)
2006–2015	Arsenal	124	(14)
2015–2017	Marseille	5	(0)
Total		139	(15)

International career
2004–2005	France U19	12	(0)
2006–2007	France U21	2	(0)
2007–2012	France	16	(1)
Medal record
Men's Football
Representing France
UEFA European Under-19 Championship
Winner	2005	Team
- * Club domestic league appearances and goals

Vassiriki Abou Diaby (born 11 May 1986) is a French former professional footballer. He played primarily in a box to box role, adept at both attacking and defending, and was described as a player who was "languid, elusive, and athletic" that could either "dribble past opponents or slip passes to team-mates". Of Ivorian descent, Diaby also possessed "superb touch" and "excellent close control". Diaby's career was hampered by numerous repetitive injuries, a problem that existed from his time in France.

His physical appearance and positional preference evoked comparisons to Arsenal compatriot Patrick Vieira.

Diaby was born in the 10th arrondissement of Paris, but was raised in the Parisian commune of Aubervilliers. He began his football career playing for hometown club CM Aubervilliers. In 1998, he joined Red Star Paris. A year later, Diaby was selected to attend the INF Clairefontaine academy. He spent four years at the academy while simultaneously training with Red Star. A year before departing Clairefontaine, Diaby moved to professional club Paris Saint-Germain. Following an administrative error by club officials which made Diaby a free agent, he joined the academy of Auxerre. He spent two years in the club's youth academy before making his professional debut in the 2004–05 season. Diaby also played in the UEFA Cup with the club. After spending the Autumn portion of the 2005–06 season with Auxerre, in January 2006, Diaby signed with English club Arsenal on a long-term contract for an undisclosed fee. He made his debut with the club that same month and scored his first goal three months later against Aston Villa. After being released from Arsenal in 2015 following persistent injury problems, Diaby signed for French Ligue 1 side Marseille. He retired from football in February 2019.

Diaby is a former French youth international, having earned caps at under-19 and under-21 level. Prior to playing for the senior team, he played on the under-19 team that won the 2005 UEFA European Under-19 Football Championship. Diaby made his senior international debut in March 2007 in a UEFA Euro 2008 qualifying match against Lithuania. He has represented France at one major international tournament; the 2010 FIFA World Cup. Diaby participated in all three group stage matches the team played as a starter.

== Personal life ==
Diaby was born in the 10th arrondissement of Paris, but was raised in a housing development in Aubervilliers, a northeastern suburb of Paris. He is the son of a long-distance truck driver and developed an interest into the sport of football after becoming fascinated by several players who played on the 1998 FIFA World Cup-winning team, most notably midfield stalwart Patrick Vieira, whom Diaby describes as "a monument to French football". Diaby was also adept at playing other sports such as basketball and boxing. Of Ivorian descent, Diaby is a practicing Muslim and, while growing up, developed a fascination towards the subjects of religion, philosophy, science, and astronomy. Diaby became interested in accountancy after taking a course at the age of 17, while he was at the Auxerre youth academy.

== Club career ==
=== Early career ===
Diaby began his football career playing for hometown club CM Aubervilliers in December 1996. While at Aubervilliers, Diaby was coached by David Giguère and Alain Mboma, the latter now serving as the manager of Red Star Paris. After two years at the club, Diaby's quick progression at the amateur club led to a move to nearby semi-professional outfit Red Star Paris in Saint-Ouen. While in the club's youth academy, Diaby was supervised by youth academy director Yves-Henri Gergaud and was described by club youth coach Marco Lienel as a player who was "fairly quiet and quite frail". Diaby started his career at the club playing on its under-13 team in the Division Honneur Régionale of the Île-de-France region. After spending a year playing with Red Star, in 1999, he was selected to attend the INF Clairefontaine academy. While at Clairefontaine, Diaby was a part of A la Clairefontaine, a documentary series which chronicled the lives of the France's top young footballers during their time at the academy. During the series, an episode showed Diaby getting into a physical confrontation with Hatem Ben Arfa.

=== Auxerre ===
==== 2002–2004 ====
Towards the end of his development at Clairefontaine, Diaby departed Red Star to play domestic football with professional club Paris Saint-Germain, despite being a supporter of Marseille. He spent a year at the Camp des Loges, the club's training center, from 2001 to 2002. After his departure from Clairefontaine, Diaby was expected to sign a youth contract with Paris Saint-Germain. Club officials wanted to keep the player, however, the club's human resources department failed to send a "letter of commitment" to Diaby's parents ahead of 30 April 2002 deadline, which resulted in the player becoming a free agent. Diaby was hastily recruited by Auxerre scouts and he joined the club's academy ahead of the 2002–03 season. In his first season in the club's youth academy, he won the Division d'Honneur des 16 ans, the under-16 league title of the Bourgogne region.

During the 2003–04 season, Diaby alternated between playing on the club's under-19 team in the Coupe Gambardella and playing in the club's reserve team in the Championnat de France amateur, the fourth level of French football. During the reserve team season, he played on the team alongside future Arsenal teammate Bacary Sagna, as well as Younès Kaboul, Hassan Yebda, Jean-Joël Perrier-Doumbé and former Clairefontaine classmate Garra Dembélé. Diaby finished the season with the team with 11 appearances and one goal as the team finished first in its group. After the season, he signed his first professional contract with the club agreeing to a three-year deal. Manager Guy Roux subsequently promoted Diaby to the first team and assigned him the number 24 shirt.

==== 2004–2006 ====
"Abou was one of the players I used at the start of the season and then he had to stop because of repetitive injuries. Maybe he was attracted by England and the money there. This probably did not force him to make all the necessary efforts to come back to his best level with us."

— Former Auxerre manager Jacques Santini following the sale of Diaby.

Similar to the previous season, Diaby regularly trained with the first team, while concurrently featuring as a starter on the club's reserve team. He made his professional debut on 14 August 2004 appearing as a substitute in a 3–1 league win over Rennes. After making his debut for the club, Diaby spent the rest of the fall season either playing on the club's reserve team or dealing with injuries. He returned to the team in March 2005 making his European debut in the team's UEFA Cup Round of 16 first leg tie against domestic rivals Lille. Diaby appeared in both legs as a substitute as Auxerre won the round 1–0 on aggregate. The club later lost in the quarter-finals to Russian club CSKA Moscow. Diaby made his first professional start on 20 March against his former youth club Paris Saint-Germain. He played 74 minutes before being substituted in a 1–0 loss. Diaby made three more appearances as a substitute to close out the season.

Following the season, Roux retired as manager of Auxerre after managing the club for 44 straight seasons. He was replaced with former France national team coach Jacques Santini. During the season, Diaby featured early on during the campaign, but as the season wore on, he struggled with injuries, which subsequently, led to the player failing to gain the confidence of Santini. Unlike fellow youngsters Sagna and Kaboul who were quickly establishing themselves at their respective positions, Diaby only featured in five league matches during the first half of the season. The midfielder did score his first professional goal on 10 September 2005 in a 3–1 loss to Rennes. In Europe, Diaby featured as a starter in the team's first round defeat to Bulgarian club Levski Sofia in the UEFA Cup. Midway through the campaign, Diaby was deemed surplus to requirements by management. Following the sale of the player, vice-president Gérard Bourgoin declared that, "We have always kept the young players which our coach wanted to use, but Diaby did not play, so this was a strategic sale for us."

=== Arsenal ===
==== 2006–2009 ====
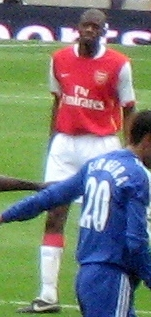
Diaby with Arsenal in the 2006–07 season.

On 13 January 2006, English club Arsenal confirmed that the club had signed Diaby on a long-term contract for an undisclosed fee, later revealed to be £2 million. Prior to joining Arsenal, the player had reportedly turned down an offer to join Arsenal's London rivals Chelsea. Upon joining Arsenal, Diaby was given the number 2 shirt, which was left vacant since the retirement of Lee Dixon. He made his club debut on 21 January 2006 appearing as a substitute in a 1–0 defeat to Everton. Three days later, he made his first start in a 2–1 Football League Cup victory over Wigan. On 21 February, Diaby made his UEFA Champions League debut appearing as a substitute in the team's Round of 16 first leg victory over Spanish club Real Madrid. Two weeks later, Diaby assisted on a goal in Arsenal's 4–0 win over Fulham. After dealing with an injury in the month of March, he returned to play in April scoring his first goal for the club in a 5–0 victory over Aston Villa on April Fools' Day 2006. He was set up for the goal by fellow club newcomer Emmanuel Adebayor.

On 1 May, Diaby suffered a severe ankle fracture after being on the receiving end of a tackle, described by the media as "horrendous", from Sunderland defender Dan Smith. After the match, Wenger described the tackle as "a bad kick and an unnecessary one" and also criticised his competitors' over-physicality, while interim Sunderland manager Kevin Ball defended Smith stating "Smith is not a malicious, dirty player and I think it's unfair to make that call on him and say he deliberately went to do it. Dan went for the ball, unfortunately Diaby was quicker than him". As a result of the injury, Diaby missed the 2006 UEFA Champions League Final, as well as the 2006 UEFA European Under-21 Football Championship. He underwent three surgeries to repair the injury and was told by doctors that the injury could possibly be career-ending. Following the surgeries, he underwent eight months of rehabilitation and made his return to first team action in the 2006–07 season in a League Cup match against Liverpool. He appeared as a substitute in the match as Arsenal won 6–3. On 25 February 2007, while participating in the 2007 Football League Cup Final against Chelsea, Diaby, while attempting to clear the ball out of the Arsenal defense, accidentally kicked rival defender John Terry in the face. Unconscious, Terry was stretchered off and hospitalized, but recovered to return to the Millennium Stadium in Cardiff for the trophy presentation following Chelsea's 2–1 win. Though Arsenal lost, Diaby was credited with an assist on the team's only goal of the match, which was converted by Theo Walcott. Diaby scored his first and only goal of the campaign on 14 March in a 1–0 win over Aston Villa when he deflected in a Júlio Baptista shot. He remained a fixture within the team for the rest of the campaign, mostly as a substitute as he only started in consecutive matches once.

In Diaby's first full season with Arsenal, he scored his first goal on 22 September 2007 in the club's 5–0 win over Derby County. Three days later, he assisted on a goal in a 2–0 League Cup win over Newcastle United. In December 2007, Diaby scored goals in back-to-back matches for the first time in his career. He scored the first goal on 12 December in the team's final Champions League group stage match against Romanian club Steaua București. Arsenal won the match 2–1. Six days later, Diaby scored Arsenal's opening goal in the club's 3–2 away win over Blackburn Rovers in the League Cup. Diaby failed to chart anything statistical for the rest of the winter months aside from an assist in a 4–1 win over Everton. On 29 March 2008, Diaby was sent off for the first time in his professional career in a league match against Bolton Wanderers for a studs-up tackle on defender Grétar Steinsson. Diaby was defended by Wenger who stated "I don't think Diaby's tackle was malicious, it was more protective". Wenger also stated that Diaby's tackle should not be compared to what had happened to teammate Eduardo da Silva a few weeks earlier.

After serving his red card suspension, Diaby featured in only one match in the final two months of the season. The match was the second leg of the club's quarter-final Champions League tie against Liverpool. In the match, Diaby netted the opening goal to give Arsenal, who drew 1–1 in the first leg, a 2–1 advantage. Arsenal, however, conceded four goals from Liverpool and lost the tie 5–3 on aggregate. Following the match against Liverpool, Diaby began struggling with a thigh injury. After the injury relapsed in a reserve match in late April, Diaby was ruled out for the rest of the season.

Diaby began the 2008–09 season late in the season after the thigh injury from the previous season was discovered to be more serious than first thought. He made his debut in the season on 18 October 2008 in a 3–1 win over Everton. Three days later, Diaby scored the third goal in a 5–2 Champions League group stage win over Fenerbahçe. He appeared regularly in the campaign for the first time in his Arsenal career. On 26 December 2008, Diaby scored his third career goal against Aston Villa in a 2–2 draw. The following month, he assisted on the equalising goal, scored by Robin van Persie, in the team's 1–1 draw with Everton. Diaby scored his second goal of the campaign in Arsenal's 3–1 league win against Newcastle on 21 March. He finished the season by scoring the team's third goal in the 4–1 win over Stoke City.

==== 2009–2012 ====
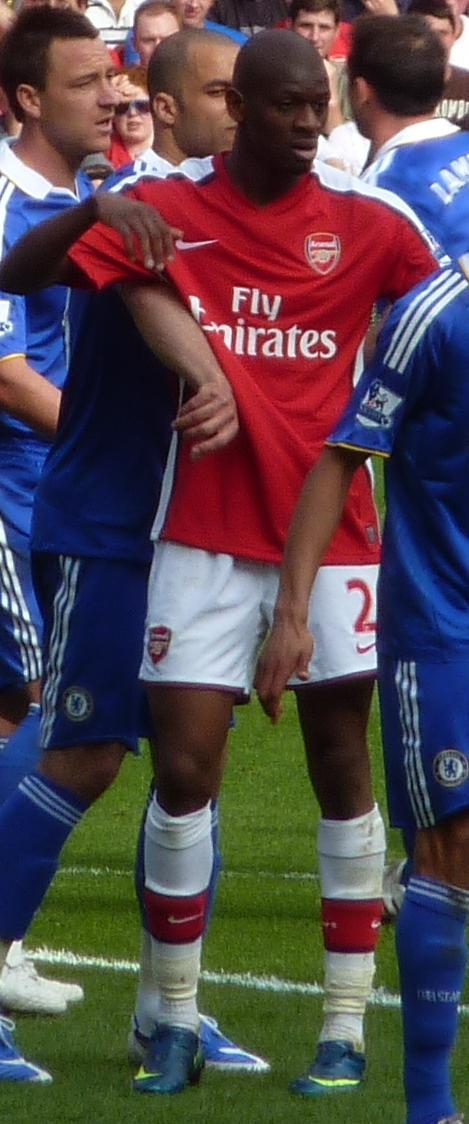
Diaby with Arsenal in the 2008–09 season against Chelsea.

Diaby started the 2009–10 season healthy for the first time since 2007 and quickly made an impact. Playing alongside Alex Song and Cesc Fàbregas, he became part of the dynamic three-man midfield partnership. On 22 August 2009, he scored a double in a 4–1 win over Portsmouth. The following month, Diaby assisted on a goal in the team's 3–2 comeback win over Belgian club Standard Liège in the Champions League. After alternating between the bench and starting lineup for the rest of September, in November, Diaby returned to the first eleven and responding by scoring the game-winning goal in a 3–1 win over Birmingham City. Three weeks later, in the Champions League, he netted another goal in a group stage win over Dutch club AZ. On 7 November, Diaby picked up an injury in a 4–1 win over Wolverhampton Wanderers. The injury resulted in the player missing France's World Cup playoff tie with the Republic of Ireland.

Diaby grabbed his fifth goal of the season in a 3–0 win over Hull City on 19 December. He also assisted on a goal in the win. A week later, Diaby scored his fourth goal overall against Aston Villa in another 3–0 victory. In the new year, Diaby began the 2010 calendar year by assisting on goals in a 2–2 draw against Everton and a 4–2 win over Bolton. On 10 February, he scored the only goal in a victory over Liverpool. Despite failing to score a goal for the rest of the season, Diaby was ever-present in the waning moments of the season starting 12 of the final 14 matches he appeared in. He finished the campaign with career-highs in matches played, goals, and assists.

Diaby began the 2010–11 season scoring a goal and issuing an assist in the team's second match of the season against Blackpool; a 6–0 win. During a match against Bolton at the Emirates Stadium on 11 September, he was injured after a challenge by Paul Robinson. Diaby was replaced in the 72nd minute by Denílson in a 4–1 win. Due to the injury, he missed two weeks and return to the team in its 3–2 loss to West Bromwich Albion. Diaby featured primarily as a substitute after returning from the injury. On 5 February 2011, he was sent off after being adjudged to have committed violent conduct on opposing midfielder Joey Barton in a league match away to Newcastle. Prior to Diaby's expulsion, Arsenal had been leading the match 4–0. The team went on to concede four unanswered goals while playing with ten men, which resulted in the club leaving St James' Park with only a point. On 10 April, Diaby scored his second goal of the season in a 3–1 win against Blackpool.

The 2011–12 season for Diaby was blighted once again by injury problems. He made just four substitute appearances during the Premier League campaign and one in the UEFA Champions League.

==== 2012–2015 ====
With the departure of Alex Song ahead of the 2012–13 season, Diaby started all three of Arsenal's opening games. His performance against Liverpool saw him awarded Man of the Match by Sky Sports in Arsenal's 2–0 win at Anfield. However, he was later injured in Arsenal's 2–1 loss against Chelsea on 29 September and was substituted. On 13 January 2013, Diaby made his return against Manchester City at the Emirates Stadium. This controversial fixture in the Premier League, saw two red cards awarded, one for each team. Arsenal lost the match 2–0. Following several spells on the sidelines during February and March, it was announced on 28 March 2013 that Diaby had torn the anterior cruciate ligament (ACL) in his left knee and that after surgery, he would be out for approximately eight or nine months.

Arsenal announced that Diaby had changed his squad number from 2 to 24 for the 2013–14 season. Soon it was announced that he would be out until March 2014, following further treatment on his knee.

On 11 May 2014, Diaby returned from injury as a substitute in a 2–0 win at Norwich City in Arsenal's final match of the 2013–14 Premier League season.

On 15 November 2014, according to some English newspapers, Diaby suffered a hamstring injury which would keep him off the pitch for the next three months.

On 10 June 2015, Diaby was released by Arsenal.

=== Marseille ===
In July 2015, Diaby signed for French Ligue 1 side Marseille after being out of football since leaving Arsenal in June 2015. Following continuing injury problems in the first half of the season, he made his return on 18 March 2016, coming on as a substitute in Marseille's 5–2 home defeat to Rennes. On 3 April 2016, he started in a league match against Bastia, his first league start in over three years. Diaby ultimately made just four appearances for the season across all competitions.

In October 2016, Diaby had to undergo an operation on his right ankle after suffering for weeks with persistent pain. He was ruled out for a period of four months following the surgery.

On 25 February 2019, Diaby announced that he was retiring from football, aged 32, most recently having played for Marseille in 2017. He only appeared in 214 senior career matches. He announced his retirement on French television channel RMC's. Diaby said, "I am bringing an end to my professional career. It is the right time. For a number of years it has been difficult for me to return, with a lot of physical problems. It is a difficult decision but I have thought a lot about my decision and I am at ease with it. After Marseille, I gave myself a year to come back but it was harder than I thought, and I have decided to stop."

== International career ==
=== Youth ===
Diaby played under manager Jean Gallice. Gallice, initially, called up Diaby at under-18 level for a match against Greece in November 2003. Diaby, however, was forced to withdraw from the squad after suffering an injury while playing domestically. He made his youth international debut at under-19 level in a 2–1 friendly match win over Turkey. In qualifying for the 2005 European Under-19 Football Championship, Diaby appeared in all six matches as France finished both the first qualifying round and the Elite Round undefeated. In the tournament, he missed the team's opening 1–1 group stage draw with England due to suspension, but returned to the starting lineup in the team's 3–1 victory over Norway in the second group stage match. Diaby, subsequently, started every remaining match, including the championship match against England. France won the match 3–1 giving the nation its sixth under-19 title and Diaby his first international honor. In total with the under-19 team, he featured in 12 matches and scored no goals. At under-21 level, Diaby made his debut on 28 February 2006 in a friendly match against Slovakia. He appeared as a substitute as France won the match 2–1. Due to suffering a fractured ankle domestically, Diaby missed the 2006 UEFA European Under-21 Football Championship. Due to repetitive injuries, he missed every qualifier for the 2007 UEFA European Under-21 Football Championship and made only one more appearance for the team, which occurred in a 1–1 draw in a friendly match with Armenia.

=== Senior ===
On 15 March 2007, Diaby was called up to the senior team for the first time by coach Raymond Domenech for UEFA Euro 2008 qualifying match against Lithuania and a friendly against Austria. He described the call-up as a "huge surprise" primarily because he has just returned from his ankle fracture just two months prior. Diaby made his senior international debut in the qualifier against Lithuania appearing as a substitute for Florent Malouda. He earned his first international start in the ensuing match against Austria; the game ending in a 1–0 victory for France. Following the Austria match, Diaby went without an appearance for France for three years. The midfielder experienced several call ups to the team during the three years, but either withdrew from the squad due to injury or was not preferred by Domenech for a match. Despite this, Diaby was named to Domenech's 30-man preliminary squad to participate in the 2010 FIFA World Cup. He made his return to the international scene in the team's 2–1 friendly match win over Costa Rica. Diaby was later named to the 23-man team to serve as a possible backup in the holding midfield role.

Ahead of the competition, it was reported that Domenech was considering changing up the style of play in the team's 4–3–3 formation with Malouda possibly moving from the winger role into the midfield. Following Malouda's relegation to the bench for insubordination, Diaby was inserted in his place and made his World Cup debut in the team's opening group stage match against Uruguay. The match ended 0–0 with Diaby playing the entire match. He was credited by Scottish newspaper The Scotsman as being the team's best performer in the goalless draw. Diaby featured as a starter in both of France's remaining group stage matches against Mexico and South Africa. France lost both matches as the competition ultimately ended in disastrous competitively and personally due to the players going on strike in response to its disagreement over the expulsion of striker Nicolas Anelka from the team. As a result of the players' mutiny, Diaby, along with the 22 other members of the team, were suspended for the team's friendly match against Norway.

Under manager Laurent Blanc, Diaby was penciled in as a starter in the team's first two competitive matches of the new season. After playing the entire match in a 2–0 victory over Luxembourg, he missed the victory against England due to injury. Diaby returned to the team for its 9 February 2011 friendly against Brazil. He appeared as a second-half substitute for Yann M'Vila as France cruised to a 1–0 win. In March 2011, Diaby was called back into the team for matches against Luxembourg and Croatia, but, for the second time in the season, withdrew from the team due to injury. He returned to the team in June 2011 for a UEFA Euro 2012 qualifying match against Belarus and friendly matches against Poland and Ukraine. Diaby featured in all three matches. Due to injuries during the 2011–12 season, he missed UEFA Euro 2012.

After over a year without an appearance at international level, Diaby returned to the national team in September 2012 under new manager Didier Deschamps. In his first appearance since June 2011, he scored his first international goal in a 2014 FIFA World Cup qualification match against Finland.

== Style of play ==
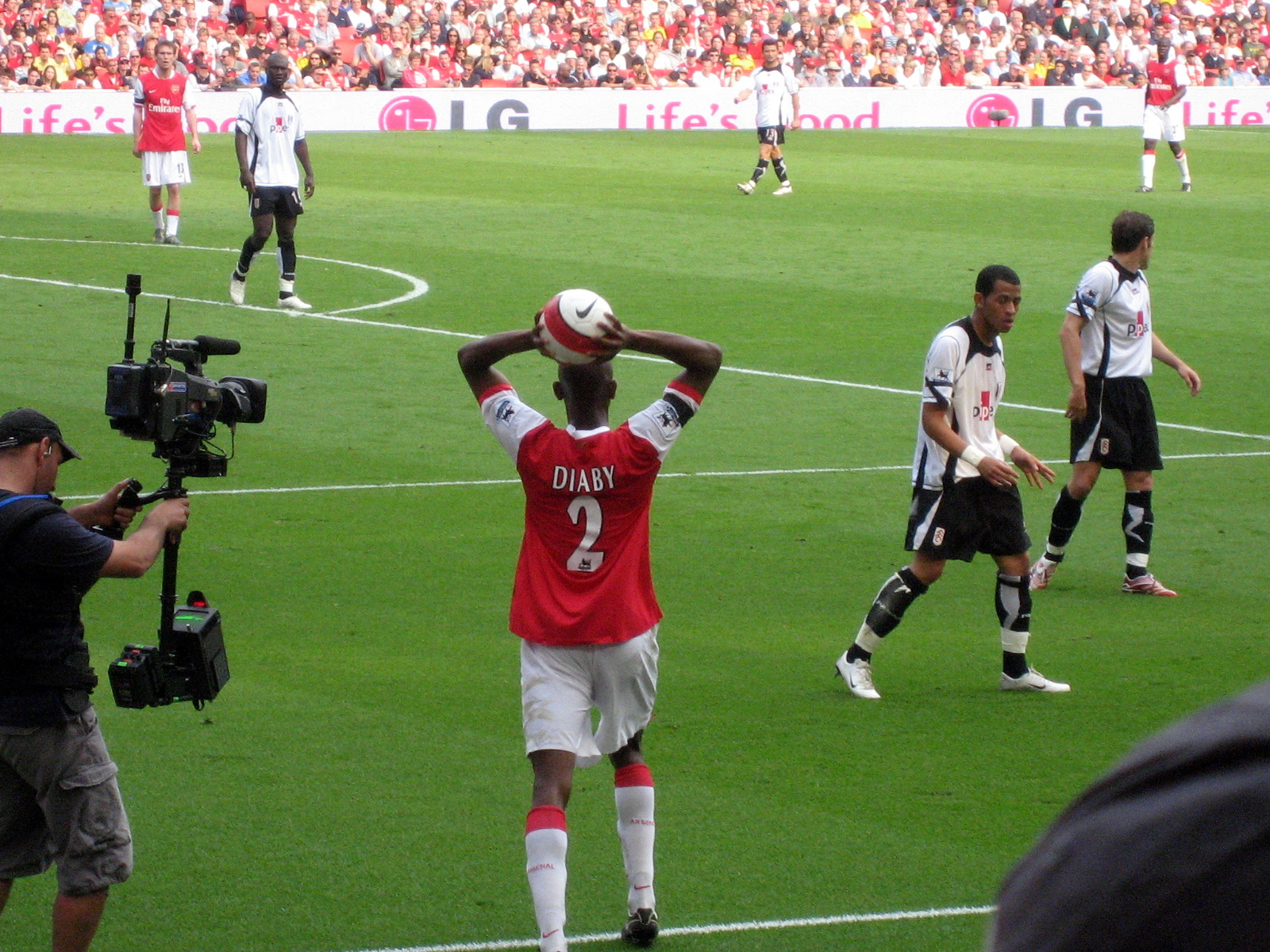
Diaby taking a throw-in in a match against Fulham in 2007

Diaby is often described as a typical box-to-box midfielder; a midfielder who is adept both offensively and defensively. While he can play as a defensive midfielder, Diaby has often attempted to distance himself from that position, admitting that "I am better if I have a holding midfielder with me". His club manager Arsène Wenger describes him similarly stating "He (Diaby) is more of an offensive player. He is not a defensive-minded player and he's not a holding player. He's a player who crosses the field at ease, goes from box to box like it's no distance and has good power as well". During his early years with Auxerre, he was often used as an attacking midfielder or a support striker due to his technical ability, close control, and dexterity to dribble past opponents or slip passes to teammates.

Upon Diaby signing with Arsenal, club manager Wenger likened him to former club player Patrick Vieira. Wenger compared the two primarily because of the similarities between each player's physical appearance and positional preference. While the two are similar in appearance, Diaby has admitted that there are huge differences, stating, "I think maybe I am more attack-minded, a more technical player," and, "Vieira is much more aggressive. He makes more of a physical impact in a game, in midfield. He is amazing. I don't think I have this quality yet. I think I can develop in that way but he is much stronger." In 2009, Wenger echoed Diaby's sentiments, stating, "I believe Vieira was more of a passer of the ball. Diaby is more of a dribbler, more offensive and makes more penetrating runs. Vieira was more of a constructor. They have a similar elegance and type of play but are not completely comparable".

Diaby was often described as being injury-prone. After returning from a fractured ankle injury in late 2006, the midfielder endured persistent niggling injuries that resulted in Diaby failing to play a full season for Arsenal. During his second season at Auxerre, a season in which he was expected to get some significant playing time, Diaby failed to gain the confidence of manager Jacques Santini primarily due to repetitive injuries he endured during the autumn portion of the 2005–06 season. After returning to the team, Diaby struggled to return to form, which ultimately resulted in his sale to Arsenal. His highest output for appearances with Arsenal came in the 2009–10 season when he played in 40 matches of Arsenal's total of 55 competitive matches in the season.

== Career statistics ==
=== Club ===
Appearances and goals by club, season and competition
Club	Season	League			National cup (Note: Includes Coupe de France, FA Cup.)		League cup (Note: Includes Coupe de la Ligue, Football League Cup.)		Europe		Total	
Club	Season	Division	Apps	Goals	Apps	Goals	Apps	Goals	Apps	Goals	Apps	Goals
Auxerre	2004–05	Ligue 1	5	0	0	0	0	0	2	0	7	0
Auxerre	2005–06	Ligue 1	5	1	0	0	0	0	2	0	7	1
Auxerre	Total		10	1	0	0	0	0	4	0	14	1
Arsenal	2005–06	Premier League	12	1	1	0	1	0	2	0	16	1
Arsenal	2006–07	Premier League	12	1	1	0	4	0	1	0	18	1
Arsenal	2007–08	Premier League	15	1	2	0	5	1	6	2	28	4
Arsenal	2008–09	Premier League	24	3	5	0	0	0	7	1	36	4
Arsenal	2009–10	Premier League	29	6	1	0	0	0	10	1	40	7
Arsenal	2010–11	Premier League	16	2	3	0	0	0	1	0	20	2
Arsenal	2011–12	Premier League	4	0	0	0	0	0	1	0	5	0
Arsenal	2012–13	Premier League	11	0	3	0	0	0	1	0	15	0
Arsenal	2013–14	Premier League	1	0	0	0	0	0	0	0	1	0
Arsenal	2014–15	Premier League	0	0	0	0	1	0	0	0	1	0
Arsenal	Total		124	14	16	0	11	1	29	4	180	19
Marseille	2015–16	Ligue 1	3	0	1	0	0	0	0	0	4	0
Marseille	2016–17	Ligue 1	2	0	0	0	0	0	0	0	2	0
Marseille	Total		5	0	1	0	0	0	0	0	6	0
Career total			139	15	17	0	11	1	33	4	200	20

=== International ===
Appearances and goals by national team and year
National team	Season	Apps	Goals
France	2006–07	2	0
France	2007–08	0	0
France	2008–09	0	0
France	2009–10	6	0
France	2010–11	7	0
France	2011–12	0	0
France	2012–13	1	1
Total		16	1

Scores and results list France's goal tally first, score column indicates score after Diaby goal

International goal scored by Abou Diaby
No.	Date	Venue	Opponent	Score	Result	Competition
1	7 September 2012	Helsinki Olympic Stadium, Helsinki, Finland	Finland	0–1	0–1	2014 FIFA World Cup qualification

== Honours ==
Arsenal

- Football League Cup runner-up: 2006–07

France U19

- UEFA European Under-19 Championship: 2005
