= 2007–08 Arsenal F.C. season =

English football club season

Arsenal F.C.
2007–08 season
- Chairman: Peter Hill-Wood
- Manager: Arsène Wenger
- Stadium: Emirates Stadium
- Premier League: 3rd
- FA Cup: Fifth round
- League Cup: Semi-finals
- UEFA Champions League: Quarter-finals
- Top goalscorer: League: Emmanuel Adebayor (24); All: Emmanuel Adebayor (30)
- Highest home attendance: 60,161 (vs. Manchester United, 3 November 2007, Premier League)
- Lowest home attendance: 53,136 (vs. Tottenham Hotspur, 9 January 2008, League Cup)
- Average home league attendance: 60,070
Home colours	Away colours	Third colours

The 2007–08 season was Arsenal Football Club's 16th season in the Premier League and their 82nd consecutive season in the top flight of English football. The club ended their Premier League campaign in third position, having led the table for two-thirds of the season. Arsenal made it into the quarter-finals of the UEFA Champions League, but were eliminated on aggregate score against Liverpool. The team exited the FA Cup in the fifth round to Manchester United and lost in the semi-finals of the League Cup to Tottenham Hotspur. This was Arsenal's first hat-trick of trophyless seasons since 1997.

Arsenal sold striker and club record goalscorer Thierry Henry to Barcelona, in the transfer window. Other departures included first team players Freddie Ljungberg and José Antonio Reyes to West Ham United and Atlético Madrid respectively; defender Bacary Sagna and striker Eduardo were the notable purchases from Auxerre and Dinamo Zagreb, respectively.

A strong start to the season saw Arsenal top the league table by September. Defeat against Sevilla in November ended a run of 28 matches undefeated and it was not until a month after did the team lose in the league for the first time, away at Middlesbrough. Arsenal extended their league lead to five points in February, but a career-threatening injury to Eduardo against Birmingham City coincided with the team going on a run of four draws in the Premier League. Manchester United soon overtook them in first and defeat to Chelsea in March moved Arsenal down in third place, where they remained at the end of the season. However, their points tally of 83 remains as the highest in the Premier League for a third-placed team under the 38 game format.

Thirty-two different players represented the club in four competitions, and there were 16 different goalscorers. Emmanuel Adebayor was Arsenal's top goalscorer in the 2007–08 season, scoring 30 goals in 48 appearances.

== Background ==
The previous season was a transitional period for Arsenal. The club transferred a number of first-team players such as defenders Sol Campbell and Lauren to Portsmouth and winger Robert Pires to Spanish club Villarreal. After lengthy negotiations, Ashley Cole moved to Chelsea on the final day of the summer transfer window, in exchange for £5 million and defender William Gallas. Arsenal played their home games at the newly constructed Emirates Stadium and drew their first game against Aston Villa. After a defeat by Bolton Wanderers, manager Arsène Wenger admitted that his team were unlikely to make a serious challenge for the Premier League. Despite being a young and inexperienced team, however, Arsenal reached the final of the League Cup, where they were beaten 2–1 by Chelsea. Elimination in the UEFA Champions League in the knockout stage (two-legged matches played home and away) and FA Cup in the space of four days followed – the club lost three games in succession for the first time since October 2002. Arsenal eventually finished fourth in the league, level on points with third-placed Liverpool but lost out on goal difference +30 to +28.

== Transfers ==
At the end of the 2006–07 season, Arsenal transferred Fabrice Muamba to Birmingham City and released Mart Poom, who subsequently joined Watford on a free transfer. Jérémie Aliadière moved to Middlesbrough in a £2 million deal while club captain and record goalscorer Thierry Henry left to join Barcelona for a reported fee of £16 million. Henry commented that his decision to leave Arsenal was because of the departure of chairman David Dein and the uncertainty over Wenger's future. Midfielder Freddie Ljungberg and striker José Antonio Reyes departed the club in July 2007, moving to West Ham United and Atlético Madrid respectively. Other players, Arturo Lupoli, Ryan Garry and Joe O'Cearuill, left on free transfers. Defender Matthew Connolly, who joined Colchester United on loan for a six-month period, later signed for Queens Park Rangers.

Legia Warsaw goalkeeper Łukasz Fabiański was the first player Arsenal recruited of the new season. Next to arrive was striker Eduardo, who signed from Dinamo Zagreb, shortly followed by French defender Bacary Sagna. Lassana Diarra was purchased on transfer deadline day from Chelsea, but later transferred to Portsmouth in January after he was frustrated at limited playing time; he said, "I read that the club [Arsenal] wanted to keep me. But when you want to keep someone, you do it by playing them. This hasn't been the case."

In

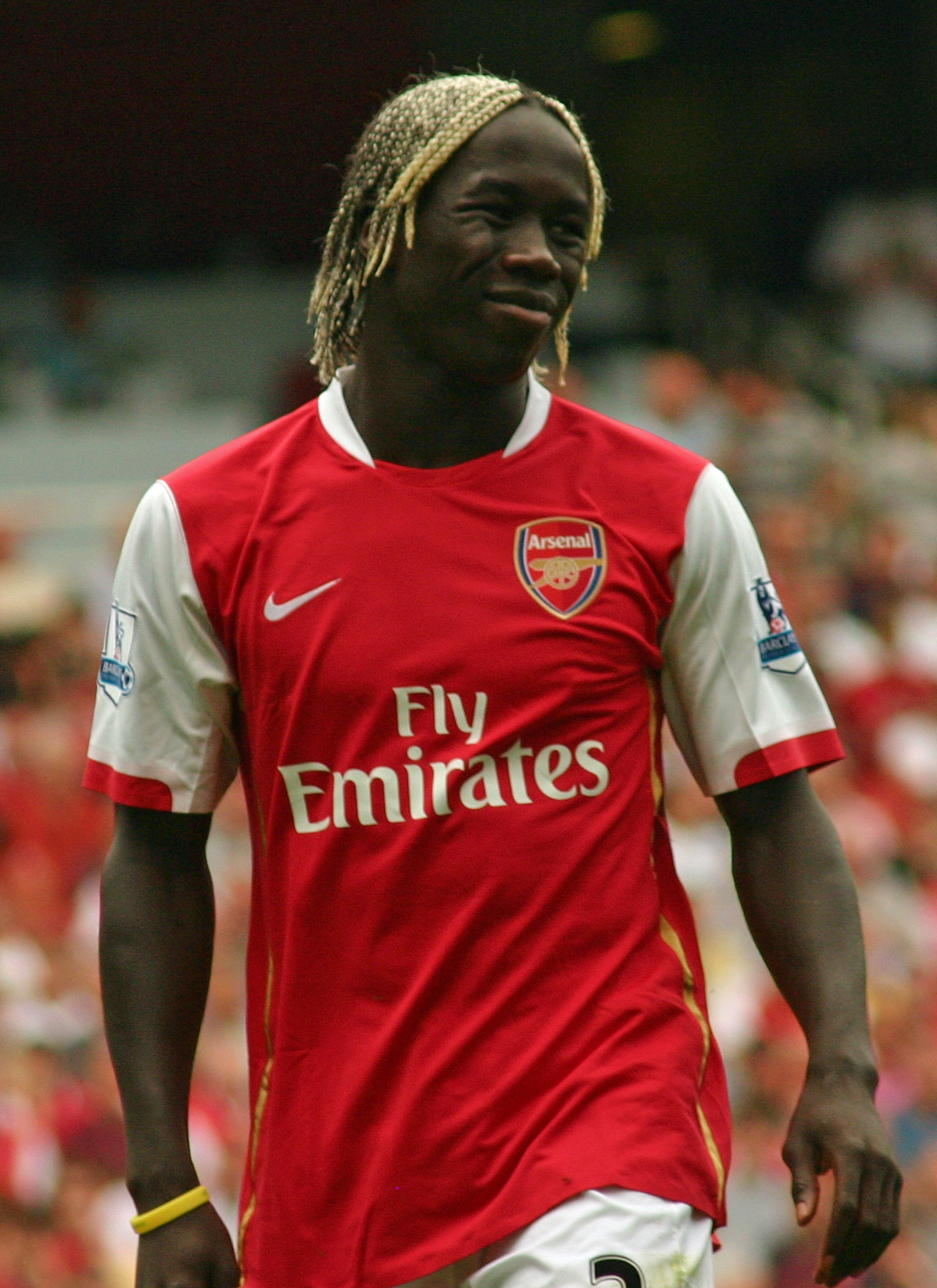
French defender Bacary Sagna joined Arsenal in the transfer window

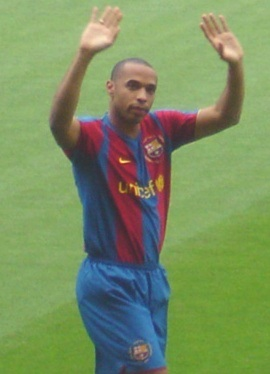
Striker Thierry Henry moved to Barcelona in June 2007

No.	Position	Player	Transferred from	Fee	Date	Ref
21	GK	Łukasz Fabiański	Legia Warsaw	£2,000,000	26 May 2007	
9	FW	Eduardo	Dinamo Zagreb	£7,500,000	3 July 2007	
55	DF	Håvard Nordtveit	Haugesund	Undisclosed	3 July 2007	
3	DF	Bacary Sagna	Auxerre	£6,000,000	12 July 2007	
8	MF	Lassana Diarra	Chelsea	£4,000,000	31 August 2007	

Out

No.	Position	Player	Transferred to	Fee	Date	Ref
	MF	Fabrice Muamba	Birmingham City	£4,000,000	11 May 2007	
21	GK	Mart Poom	Watford	Free transfer	26 May 2007	
30	FW	Jérémie Aliadière	Middlesbrough	£2,000,000	19 June 2007	
14	FW	Thierry Henry	Barcelona	£16,000,000	25 June 2007	
	FW	Arturo Lupoli	Fiorentina	Free transfer	1 July 2007	
8	MF	Freddie Ljungberg	West Ham United	£3,000,000	23 July 2007	
9	FW	José Antonio Reyes	Atlético Madrid	£6,000,000	31 July 2007	
	DF	Ryan Garry	AFC Bournemouth	Free transfer	6 August 2007	
	DF	Joe O'Cearuill	Barnet	Free transfer	24 August 2007	
	DF	Matthew Connolly	Queens Park Rangers	£1,000,000	2 January 2008	
8	MF	Lassana Diarra	Portsmouth	£5,500,000	17 January 2008	

Loans out

No.	Position	Player	Loaned to	Date	Loan expires	Ref
	DF	Matthew Connolly	Colchester United	6 July 2007	2 January 2008	
	DF	Kerrea Gilbert	Southend United	30 July 2007	3 January 2008	
	FW	Jay Simpson	Millwall	31 August 2007	4 May 2008	

== Club ==
=== Coaching staff ===
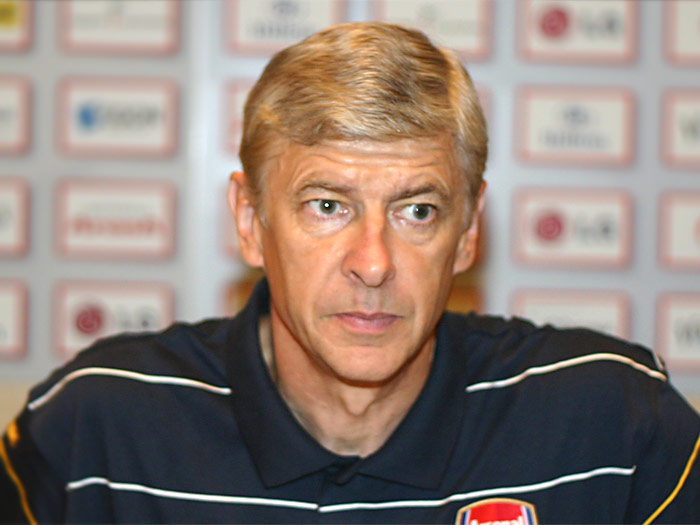
This is Arsène Wenger's 12th seasons with Arsenal.

Position	Staff
Manager	(France) Arsène Wenger
Assistant manager	(Northern Ireland) Pat Rice
First team coach	(Bosnia and Herzegovina) Boro Primorac
Goalkeeping coach	(Republic of Ireland) Gerry Peyton
Physiotherapist	(England) Gary Lewin
Fitness coach	(England) Tony Colbert
Chief scout	(England) Steve Rowley

Last updated: 2 August 2006
Source: Arsenal FC

=== Kit ===
Supplier: Nike / Sponsor: Fly Emirates

Home	Home alt.	Away	Away alt.	Away alt. 2	Third
Goalkeeper 1	Goalkeeper 2	Goalkeeper alt.	Goalkeeper alt. 2	Goalkeeper 3

=== Kit information ===
Nike released new kit for Arsenal this season.

- Home: The home kit from last season was unchanged.
- Away: The away kit with a design that celebrates the pioneering spirit of club legendary Herbert Chapman, and sees a return to the white away shirts worn throughout the club's history. The shirt incorporates a tonal print in a horizontal stripe, detailing many of Chapman's groundbreaking innovations which among others include the introduction of the white ball, rubber studs and numbered shirts. The Gunners legend also campaigned for Gillespie Road tube station to be changed to Arsenal tube station - the setting for the print adverts - to further promote the club's name, and was successful with its renaming in 1932. The kit with a redcurrant v-neck collar and a red currant trim to the sleeves - the hooped design another of the ideas that Chapman introduced to the club along with his inspiration for Arsenal's famous red and white shirt.
- Third: The third kit featured with hooped dark-redcurrant shirts with gold trim in side collar, dark shorts and hooped redcurrant in dark socks with gold stripes, same as the away kit to commemorate the influence and achievements of under club legend Herbert Chapman.
- Keeper: The goalkeeper kit are yellow. grey and navy blue.

=== Other information ===
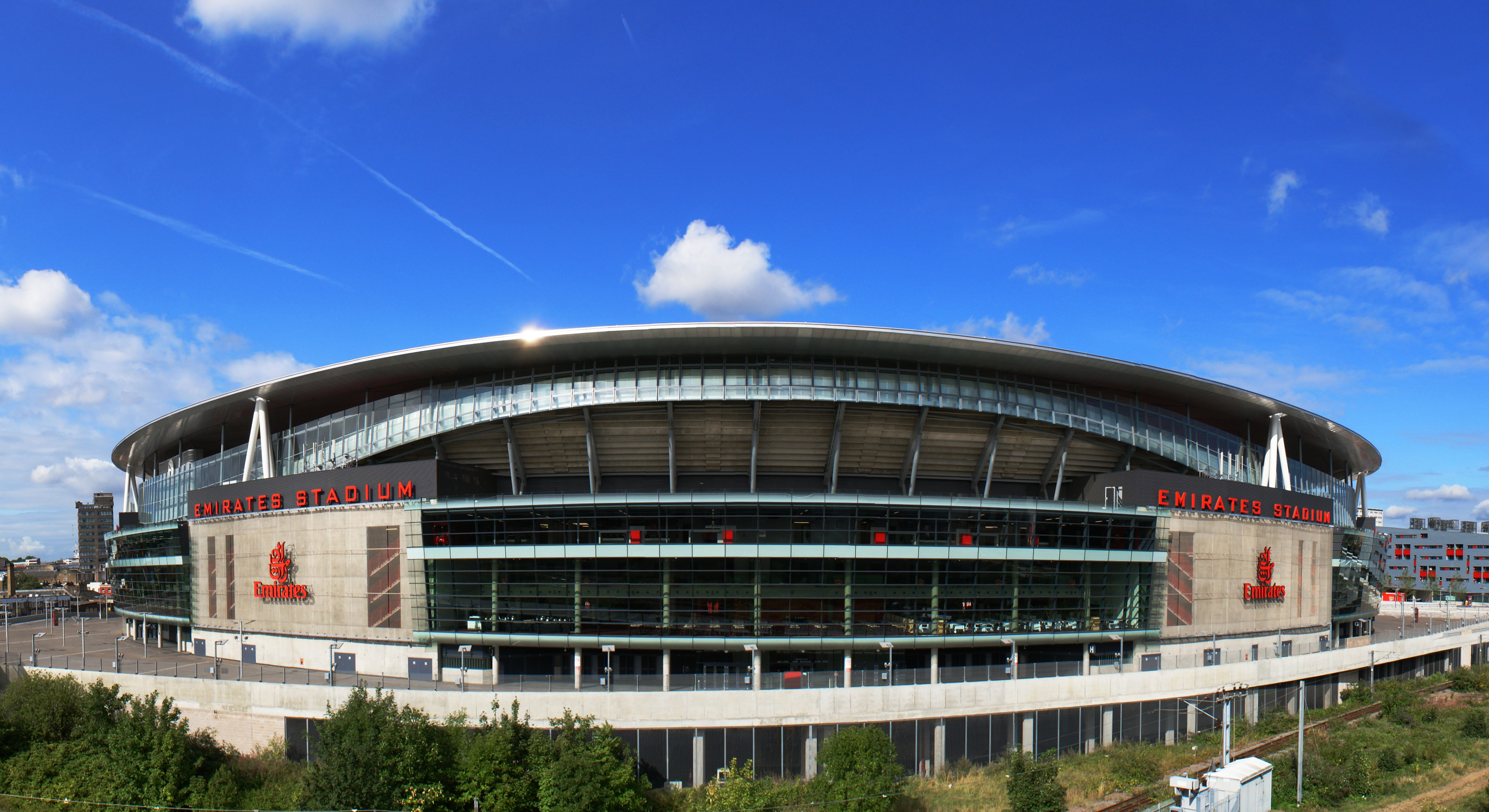
The Emirates Stadium is the second largest stadium in the Premier League.

Chairman	(England) Peter Hill-Wood
Ground (capacity and dimensions)	Emirates Stadium (60,355 / 114x71 yards)

Updated to match played 2 August 2007
Source: Arsenal and Emirates Stadium

== Pre-season ==
14 July 2007	Barnet	0–2	Arsenal	Barnet
15:00 BST		Report	Adebayor 18'; Barazite 66'	Stadium: Underhill Stadium; Attendance: 5,091; Referee: Michael Russell

19 July 2007 Austria Tour	Gençlerbirliği (Turkey)	0–3	(England) Arsenal	Bad Waltersdorf
19:00 BST		Report	Van Persie 45', 65'; Walcott 51'	Stadium: Bad Waltersdorf Stadion

25 July 2007 Austria Tour	Red Bull Salzburg (Austria)	1–0	(England) Arsenal	Salzburg
19:00 BST	Janočko 75'	Report		Stadium: EM Stadion; Attendance: 31,000

28 July 2007 Emirates Cup	Arsenal (England)	2–1	(France) Paris Saint-Germain	London
16:15 BST	Flamini 45'; Bendtner 70'	Report	Luyindula 80'	Stadium: Emirates Stadium; Attendance: 55,106; Referee: Peter Walton

29 July 2007 Emirates Cup	Arsenal (England)	2–1	(Italy) Internazionale	London
16:15 BST	Hleb 67'; Van Persie 85'	Report	Suazo 62'	Stadium: Emirates Stadium; Attendance: 59,821; Referee: Mark Halsey

2 August 2007 Amsterdam Tournament	Lazio (Italy)	1–2	(England) Arsenal	Amsterdam
18:30 CET	Pandev 40'	Report	Bendtner 19'; Eduardo 55'	Stadium: Amsterdam Arena; Attendance: 20,000; Referee: Bas Nijhuis

4 August 2007 Amsterdam Tournament	Ajax (Netherlands)	0–1	(England) Arsenal	Amsterdam
21:15 CET		Report	Van Persie 87'	Stadium: Amsterdam Arena; Attendance: 30,000; Referee: Eric Blom

== Premier League ==
Twenty teams competed in the Premier League in the 2007–08 season. Each team played 38 matches, two against every other team and one match at each club's stadium. Three points were awarded for each win, one point per draw, and none for defeats. At the end of the season, the top two teams qualified for the group stages of the UEFA Champions League; teams in third and fourth needed to play a qualifier.

The provisional fixture list was released on 14 June 2007, but was subject to change in the event of clashes with other competitions, inclement weather, or matches being selected for television coverage.

=== August–October ===
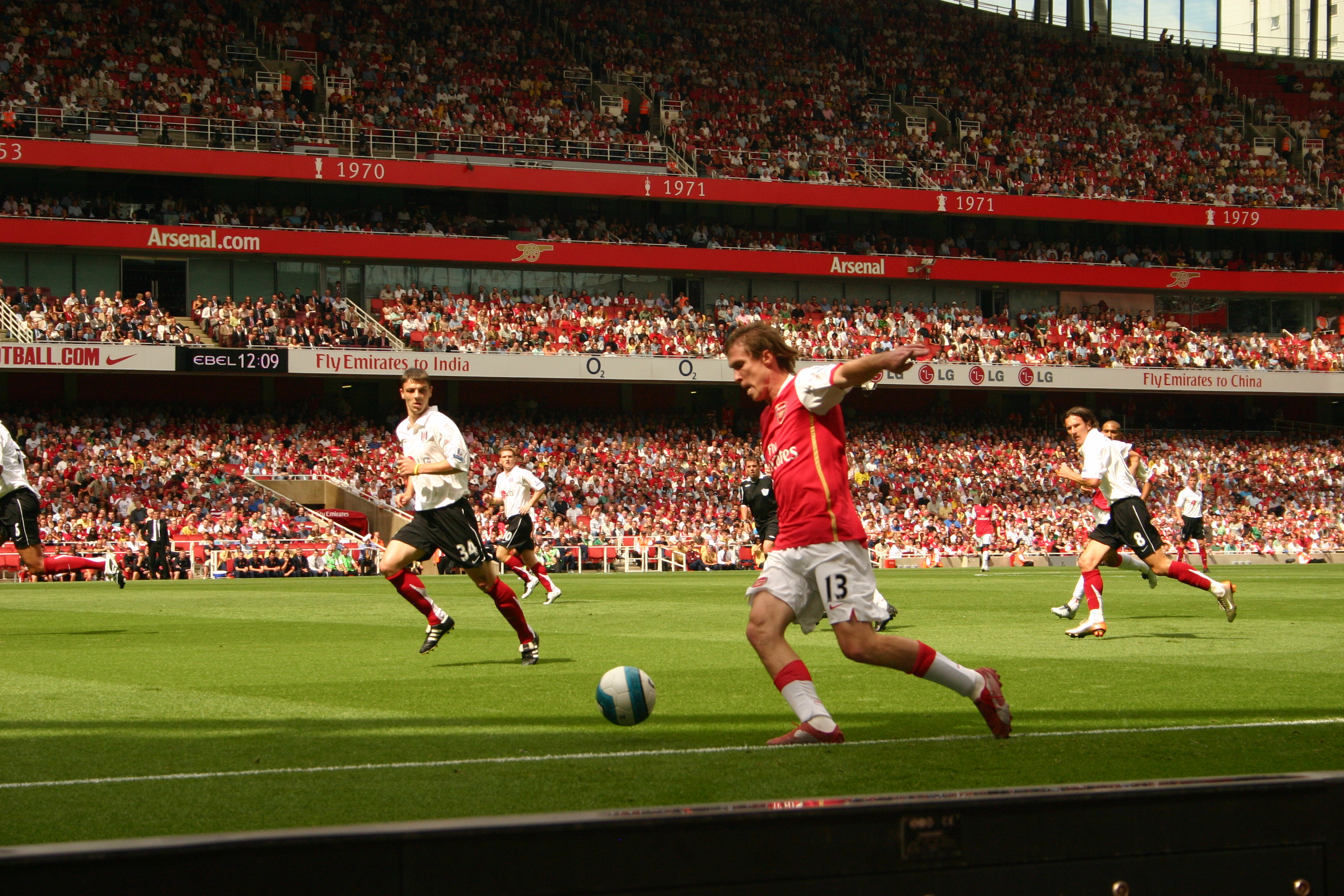
Alexander Hleb in action against Fulham

Arsenal started their league campaign at home to Fulham on 12 August 2007. A mistake by goalkeeper Jens Lehmann, "screw[ing] an attempted return pass against his own knee", allowed striker David Healy to score, just under 52 seconds. However, a late penalty scored by Robin van Persie and a goal from Alexander Hleb resulted in the team winning the match. In their next match, away to Blackburn Rovers, another error by Lehmann – this time letting David Dunn's shot slip through his fingers and into the goalnet, meant the team drew 1–1. Cesc Fàbregas scored the winning goal against Manchester City, ten minutes before the end of the match. The result was followed with what The Guardian described as a "fluent attacking display" at home to Portsmouth, on the first day of September. Arsenal faced local rivals Tottenham Hotspur after a week-long international break and went a goal behind when Gareth Bale's free-kick beat goalkeeper Manuel Almunia, past the net. Emmanuel Adebayor scored the equaliser in the second half, before Fàbregas "piloted a 30-yarder beyond Paul Robinson in the 80th minute." In stoppage time, Adebayor flicked the ball up and volleyed it into the top corner of Tottenham's goal; the result meant Arsenal went top of the league table, for the first time in the season. A week after, Adebayor scored a hat-trick (three goals) in a 5–0 win against Derby County. Van Persie scored the only goal against West Ham United on 29 September 2007 to maintain the lead at the top.

Two goals from Van Persie helped Arsenal beat Sunderland 3–2 at home, on the first weekend of October. Second half goals from defender Kolo Touré and midfielder Tomáš Rosický against Bolton Wanderers, gave the team a seventh straight victory in the league. Arsenal played Liverpool on 28 October 2007, a match billed as the "first great test" of their title credentials. Steven Gerrard gave Liverpool an early lead, from a free-kick, but as the match went on, Arsenal began to dominate possession, eventually rewarded when Fábregas equalised in the 80th minute, from a Hleb through ball.

=== November–February ===
November began with a home match against Manchester United. Going into the match, both clubs were level on points and goal difference, at the top of the league. In the 45th minute, Gallas inadvertently scored an own goal to give United the lead, before Fábregas equalised early in the second half. Cristiano Ronaldo scored what was thought to be the winning goal, eight minutes from the end, but Arsenal equalised for the second time in the match via Gallas. The draw pleased Wenger, who after the game noted his team were "...still charge of the title race because we are top with a game in hand". A win against Reading at the Madejski Stadium on 12 November 2007 brought about Arsenal's 1,000th Premier League goal, scored by Adebayor. Reading striker Dave Kitson afterwards praised Arsenal's performance and asserted they were "the best team on the planet": "The thing that amazes you most is they are not just passing to each other – they are passing so that person can run on to the ball and then his mind is already made up what he is going to do next. It is just magic, it is unbelievable."

"Arsenal are my favourite team right now and I think they are the best performing team in the Premier League."

— Pelé, November 2007

Late goals scored by Gallas and Rosický at home to Wigan Athletic kept Arsenal three points clear of Manchester United in the league table, at the end of November. The win at Villa Park against Aston Villa in December, moved Arsenal five points clear at the top of the league table, and provoked speculation as to whether the club could go another league season unbeaten; Wenger responded, "People will talk ... just let us play." The team played out a 1–1 draw at Newcastle United four days after and lost against Middlesbrough, ending a record of 22 league matches unbeaten. Arsenal beat Chelsea 1–0 on 16 December 2007 and needed a late goal, scored by substitute Nicklas Bendtner to win against Tottenham Hotspur. In spite of a draw at Portsmouth on Boxing Day, which moved Arsenal down to second place, a win against Everton helped the club move past Manchester United to the first-place spot.

On 1 January 2008, Eduardo and Adebayor each scored to earn Arsenal a win against West Ham United. The team dropped two points against Birmingham City, but a 3–0 victory at Fulham meant that Arsenal retained their first-place status. Goals scored by Mathieu Flamini, Adebayor and Fábregas helped Arsenal beat Newcastle United in the final week of January. The team became the first to reach 60 points in February, after winning 3–1 against Manchester City; Wenger described the feat as "phenomenal". Manchester City's defeat of Manchester United the following week meant a 2–0 win at home to Blackburn Rovers put Arsenal five points clear in first spot, with 12 matches to play.

The team then faced Birmingham City at St Andrew's. Shortly after kick-off, defender Martin Taylor was sent off and took no further part in the game, after his tackle on Eduardo. The player's challenge left the Arsenal striker with a broken leg; he was ruled out from action for the rest of the season. James McFadden scored through a free-kick in the 28th minute, before two Theo Walcott goals in the second half put Arsenal in the lead. In stoppage time, Gaël Clichy was penalised for a foul on Stuart Parnaby in the penalty area; McFadden scored Birmingham's awarded penalty to draw the match 2–2. It prompted Gallas to throw a tantrum: he attacked an advertising board situated on the side of the pitch and rested alone on the pitch, while his players headed for the dressing room. Wenger after the match called for a permanent football ban on tackler Taylor; he later retracted the comment.

=== March–May ===
A late equaliser at home to Aston Villa preserved Arsenal's lead at the top of the Premier League to only a point. A goalless draw at Wigan Athletic, was followed by a fourth consecutive draw in the league, at home to Middlesbrough. On the same day, Manchester United moved above Arsenal, who recorded a 1–0 win against Derby County. After Gallas missed a chance to score in the first half, Sagna put Arsenal in front, heading the ball into the goal net, from a corner in the 59th minute. Didier Drogba equalised for Chelsea in the 73rd minute and nine minutes later scored the winner, from a Nicolas Anelka flick-on. The result pushed Chelsea up into second place and moved Arsenal down one; both clubs were five and six points behind Manchester United respectively at the top. At the Reebok Stadium on 29 March 2008, Arsenal played Bolton Wanderers. The team went two goals down in the first half, both scored by Matthew Taylor and lost Abou Diaby, who was sent off for a foul on Grétar Steinsson. The team's "dramatic" comeback however, in the form of a winning goal in stoppage time, secured their first league win at Bolton Wanderers' ground in six years.

A 1–1 draw against Liverpool in early April, sandwiched in between Champions League legs between both teams "disappointed" Wenger, who refused to concede winning the title. Defeat to Manchester United at Old Trafford on 13 April 2008, however ended any realistic chance of overtaking the leaders, as United, the champions, needed two more wins to retain the title. Arsenal beat relegation-threatened Reading 2–0 the week after. Adebayor scored a hat-trick against Derby County on 28 April 2008, which made him the first player to score three goals, home and away against the same side in the same season. The win secured third place, pleasing Wenger who felt the team had a "great future – I believe we were really unlucky not to win something this year." Arsenal won their remaining two fixtures against Everton and Sunderland by a single goal, ending the campaign four points behind champions Manchester United.

=== Match results ===
12 August 2007 1	Arsenal	2–1	Fulham	London
12:00 BST	Van Persie 84' (pen.); Flamini (yellow card) 85'; Hleb 90'	Report	Healy 1'; Bocanegra (yellow card) 59'; Smertin (yellow card) 66'; Kamara (yellow card) 73'; Warner (yellow card) 85'; Diop (yellow card) 85'	Stadium: Emirates Stadium; Attendance: 60,093; Referee: Phil Dowd

19 August 2007 2	Blackburn Rovers	1–1	Arsenal	Blackburn
15:00 BST	Bentley (yellow card) 24'; Samba (yellow card) 29'; Savage (yellow card) 45+2'; Nelsen (yellow card) 60' (yellow-red card) 84'; Dunn 72'	Report	Van Persie 18', (yellow card) 74'; Flamini (yellow card) 29'; Eduardo (yellow card) 65'; Clichy (yellow card) 66'	Stadium: Ewood Park; Attendance: 24,917; Referee: Alan Wiley

25 August 2007 3	Arsenal	1–0	Manchester City	London
15:00 BST	Fàbregas 80'	Report	Hamann (yellow card) 17'	Stadium: Emirates Stadium; Attendance: 60,114; Referee: Chris Foy

2 September 2007 4	Arsenal	3–1	Portsmouth	London
13:30 BST	Adebayor 8' (pen.); Fàbregas 35', (yellow card) 67'; Senderos (red card) 49'; Rosický 59'	Report	Hreiðarsson (yellow card) 44'; Kanu (yellow card) 54', (goal) 60'	Stadium: Emirates Stadium; Attendance: 60,114; Referee: Mark Halsey

15 September 2007 5	Tottenham Hotspur	1–3	Arsenal	London
13:30 BST	Bale 15'; Jenas (yellow card) 35'; Chimbonda (yellow card) 45'	Report	Sagna (yellow card) 63'; Adebayor 65', 90+4'; Hleb (yellow card) 67'; Fàbregas 80'	Stadium: White Hart Lane; Attendance: 36,053; Referee: Mark Clattenburg

22 September 2007 6	Arsenal	5–0	Derby County	London
15:00 BST	Diaby 10'; Adebayor 25', 50' (pen.), 79'; Eduardo (yellow card) 28'; Fàbregas 70'	Report	Lewis (yellow card) 39'	Stadium: Emirates Stadium; Attendance: 60,122; Referee: Martin Atkinson

29 September 2007 7	West Ham United	0–1	Arsenal	London
15:00 BST	Bowyer (yellow card) 16'; Noble (yellow card) 29'	Report	Van Persie 13'; Flamini (yellow card) 58'; Eboué (yellow card) 90+4'	Stadium: Boleyn Ground; Attendance: 34,966; Referee: Alan Wiley

7 October 2007 8	Arsenal	3–2	Sunderland	London
12:00 BST	Van Persie 7', 80'; Senderos 14'	Report	Jones (yellow card) 4', (goal) 48'; Wallace 25'; Chopra (yellow card) 27'; McShane (red card) 90'	Stadium: Emirates Stadium; Attendance: 60,098; Referee: Rob Styles

20 October 2007 9	Arsenal	2–0	Bolton Wanderers	London
15:00 BST	Fàbregas (yellow card) 20'; Touré 68'; Rosický 80'	Report	Diouf (yellow card) 20'; McCann (yellow card) 21'; Nolan (yellow card) 71'; Davies (yellow card) 87'; Campo (yellow card) 90+1'	Stadium: Emirates Stadium; Attendance: 59,442; Referee: Mike Riley

28 October 2007 10	Liverpool	1–1	Arsenal	Liverpool
16:00 BST	Voronin (yellow card) 5'; Gerrard 7'; Mascherano (yellow card) 55'; Carragher (yellow card) 90'	Report	Rosický (yellow card) 51'; Touré (yellow card) 64'; Fàbregas 80', (yellow card) 80'	Stadium: Anfield; Attendance: 44,122; Referee: Howard Webb

3 November 2007 11	Arsenal	2–2	Manchester United	London
12:45 GMT	Fàbregas (yellow card) 40', (goal) 49'; Gallas 90+1'	Report	Evra (yellow card) 16'; Hargreaves (yellow card) 26'; Gallas 45+1' (o.g.); Ronaldo 82'	Stadium: Emirates Stadium; Attendance: 60,161; Referee: Howard Webb

12 November 2007 12	Reading	1–3	Arsenal	Reading
20:00 GMT	Gunnarsson (yellow card) 85'; Shorey 87'	Report	Flamini 44'; Adebayor 52'; Hleb 78'; Fàbregas (yellow card) 80'	Stadium: Madejski Stadium; Attendance: 24,024; Referee: Rob Styles

24 November 2007 13	Arsenal	2–0	Wigan Athletic	London
15:00 GMT	Gallas (yellow card) 72', (goal) 83'; Rosický 85'	Report	Brown (yellow card) 15'; Granqvist (yellow card) 53'; Bent (yellow card) 72'; Heskey (yellow card) 73'	Stadium: Emirates Stadium; Attendance: 60,126; Referee: Peter Walton

1 December 2007 14	Aston Villa	1–2	Arsenal	Birmingham
17:15 GMT	Gardner 14'; Bouma (yellow card) 37'; Carew (yellow card) 56'; Young (yellow card) 87'	Report	Flamini 23'; Adebayor (yellow card) 32', (goal) 36'; Gallas (yellow card) 55'	Stadium: Villa Park; Attendance: 42,018; Referee: Chris Foy

5 December 2007 15	Newcastle United	1–1	Arsenal	Newcastle upon Tyne
19:45 GMT	Barton (yellow card) 41'; Given (yellow card) 59'; S. Taylor 60'; Beye (yellow card) 72'	Report	Adebayor 4'; Diarra (yellow card) 45'; Sagna (yellow card) 63'	Stadium: St. James' Park; Attendance: 50,305; Referee: Mike Dean

9 December 2007 16	Middlesbrough	2–1	Arsenal	Middlesbrough
13:45 GMT	Downing 4' (pen.); O'Neil (yellow card) 26'; Rochemback (yellow card) 57'; Tuncay 73'	Report	Touré (yellow card) 50'; Clichy (yellow card) 52'; Rosický 90+5'	Stadium: Riverside Stadium; Attendance: 26,428; Referee: Howard Webb

16 December 2007 17	Arsenal	1–0	Chelsea	London
16:00 GMT	Adebayor (yellow card) 22'; Eboué (yellow card) 35'; Gallas 45+2'; Flamini (yellow card) 63'; Fàbregas (yellow card) 90+6'	Report	Terry (yellow card) 30'; Lampard (yellow card) 30'; J. Cole (yellow card) 67'; Ben Haim (yellow card) 74'; Mikel (yellow card) 84'	Stadium: Emirates Stadium; Attendance: 60,139; Referee: Alan Wiley

22 December 2007 18	Arsenal	2–1	Tottenham Hotspur	London
12:45 GMT	Gallas (yellow card) 38'; Adebayor 48'; Bendtner 76'	Report	Boateng (yellow card) 60'; Berbatov 66', (yellow card) 67'; Tainio (yellow card) 70', Keane (penalty missed) 71'	Stadium: Emirates Stadium; Attendance: 60,087; Referee: Rob Styles

26 December 2007 19	Portsmouth	0–0	Arsenal	Portsmouth
19:45 GMT	Lauren (yellow card) 56'; Diop (yellow card) 81'	Report	Eboué (yellow card) 60'	Stadium: Fratton Park; Attendance: 20,556; Referee: Steve Bennett

29 December 2007 20	Everton	1–4	Arsenal	Liverpool
17:15 GMT	Cahill 19'; Arteta (red card) 84'	Report	Bendtner (yellow card) 24' (yellow-red card) 74'; Eduardo 47', 58', (yellow card) 66'; Clichy (yellow card) 68'; Adebayor 78'; Fàbregas (yellow card) 86'; Flamini (yellow card) 87'; Rosický 90+3'	Stadium: Goodison Park; Attendance: 39,443; Referee: Martin Atkinson

1 January 2008 21	Arsenal	2–0	West Ham United	London
15:00 GMT	Eduardo 2'; Adebayor 18'	Report	Cole (yellow card) 23'; McCartney (yellow card) 64'; Noble (yellow card) 90+2'	Stadium: Emirates Stadium; Attendance: Chris Foy; Referee: 60,102

12 January 2008 22	Arsenal	1–1	Birmingham City	London
15:00 GMT	Adebayor 21' (pen.); Hleb (yellow card) 55'	Report	Kapo (yellow card) 39'; O'Connor 48'; Ridgewell (yellow card) 55'	Stadium: Emirates Stadium; Attendance: 60,037; Referee: Phil Dowd

19 January 2008 23	Fulham	0–3	Arsenal	London
15:00 GMT		Report	Adebayor 19', 38'; Clichy (yellow card) 66'; Rosický 81'	Stadium: Craven Cottage; Attendance: 25,297; Referee: Peter Walton

29 January 2008 24	Arsenal	3–0	Newcastle United	London
19:45 GMT	Hleb (yellow card) 20'; Adebayor 40'; Flamini 72'; Fàbregas 80'	Report	N'Zogbia (yellow card) 35'; Owen (yellow card) 73'; Caçapa (yellow card) 80'	Stadium: Emirates Stadium; Attendance: 60,127; Referee: Mike Riley

2 February 2008 25	Manchester City	1–3	Arsenal	Manchester
12:45 GMT	Fernandes 28'; Petrov (yellow card) 62'; Elano (yellow card) 89'	Report	Adebayor 9', 88'; Eduardo 26'	Stadium: City of Manchester Stadium; Attendance: 46,426; Referee: Andre Marriner

11 February 2008 26	Arsenal	2–0	Blackburn Rovers	London
20:00 GMT	Senderos 4'; Adebayor 90+1'; Fàbregas (yellow card) 90+1'	Report		Stadium: Emirates Stadium; Attendance: 60,049; Referee: Steve Bennett

23 February 2008 27	Birmingham City	2–2	Arsenal	Birmingham
12:45 GMT	Taylor (red card) 3'; McFadden 28', 90+5' (pen.)	Report	Walcott 50', 55'; Gallas (yellow card) 90+5'; Sagna (yellow card) 90+5'	Stadium: St Andrew's; Attendance: 27,195; Referee: Mike Dean

1 March 2008 28	Arsenal	1–1	Aston Villa	London
15:00 GMT	Gallas (yellow card) 30'; Bendtner 90+3'	Report	Senderos 27' (o.g.); Barry (yellow card) 80'; Osbourne (yellow card) 90+2'	Stadium: Emirates Stadium; Attendance: 60,097; Referee: Mark Clattenburg

9 March 2008 29	Wigan Athletic	0–0	Arsenal	Wigan
16:00 GMT	King (yellow card) 71'; Sibierski (yellow card) 76'	Report	Bendtner (yellow card) 25'; Gilberto (yellow card) 61'	Stadium: JJB Stadium; Attendance: 19,676; Referee: Rob Styles

15 March 2008 30	Arsenal	1–1	Middlesbrough	London
17:15 GMT	Touré 86'; Eboué (yellow card) 90+5'	Report	Aliadière 25'; Wheater (yellow card) 27'; O'Neil (yellow card) 80'; Mido (red card) 88'	Stadium: Emirates Stadium; Attendance: Mark Halsey; Referee: 60,084

23 March 2008 31	Chelsea	2–1	Arsenal	London
16:00 GMT	J. Cole (yellow card) 32'; Ballack (yellow card) 34'; Drogba 72', 81' (yellow card) 73'	Report	Eboué (yellow card) 5'; Sagna 59'	Stadium: Stamford Bridge; Attendance: 41,824; Referee: Mark Clattenburg

29 March 2008 32	Bolton Wanderers	2–3	Arsenal	Bolton
15:00 BST	M. Taylor 14', 43'; Davies (yellow card) 45+1'; Diouf (yellow card) 54'	Report	Diaby (red card) 31'; Fàbregas (yellow card) 44'; Touré (yellow card) 45+1'; Gallas 62'; Van Persie 68' (pen.); Samuel 90+1' (o.g.)	Stadium: Reebok Stadium; Attendance: 22,431; Referee: Chris Foy

5 April 2008 33	Arsenal	1–1	Liverpool	London
12:45 BST	Bendtner 54'; Eboué (yellow card) 67'	Report	Riise (yellow card) 30'; Crouch 42'; Pennant (yellow card) 54'	Stadium: Emirates Stadium; Attendance: 60,111; Referee: Phil Dowd

13 April 2008 34	Manchester United	2–1	Arsenal	Manchester
16:00 BST	Brown (yellow card) 15'; Ronaldo 54' (pen.); Carrick (yellow card) 59'; Hargreaves 72'	Report	van Persie (yellow card) 38'; Adebayor 48', (yellow card) 63'; Lehmann (yellow card) 53'; Hleb (yellow card) 56'; Gallas (yellow card) 59'; Hoyte (yellow card) 90+5'	Stadium: Old Trafford; Attendance: 75,985; Referee: Howard Webb

19 April 2008 35	Arsenal	2–0	Reading	London
12:45 BST	Adebayor 30'; Gilberto 38'	Report	Kitson (yellow card) 28'; Bikey (yellow card) 58'; Sonko (yellow card) 70'	Stadium: Emirates Stadium; Attendance: 60,109; Referee: Peter Walton

28 April 2008 36	Derby County	2–6	Arsenal	Derby
20:00 BST	McEveley 31'; Earnshaw 77'	Report	Bendtner 25'; Van Persie 39'; Adebayor 59', 81', 90+1'; Walcott 78'	Stadium: Pride Park Stadium; Attendance: 33,003; Referee: Andre Marriner

4 May 2008 37	Arsenal	1–0	Everton	London
13:30 BST	Bendtner 77'	Report	Lescott (yellow card) 28'	Stadium: Emirates Stadium; Attendance: 60,123; Referee: Alan Wiley

11 May 2008 38	Sunderland	0–1	Arsenal	Sunderland
15:00 BST	Collins (yellow card) 54'	Report	Walcott 24'; Clichy (yellow card) 82'	Stadium: Stadium of Light; Attendance: 47,802; Referee: Keith Stroud

==== Classification ====
Pos	Team	Pld	W	D	L	GF	GA	GD	Pts	Qualification or relegation
1	Manchester United (C)	38	27	6	5	80	22	+58	87	Qualification for the Champions League group stage
2	Chelsea	38	25	10	3	65	26	+39	85	Qualification for the Champions League group stage
3	Arsenal	38	24	11	3	74	31	+43	83	Qualification for the Champions League third qualifying round
4	Liverpool	38	21	13	4	67	28	+39	76	Qualification for the Champions League third qualifying round
5	Everton	38	19	8	11	55	33	+22	65	Qualification for the UEFA Cup first round

Source: Barclays Premier League
Rules for classification: 1) points; 2) goal difference; 3) number of goals scored.
For further information on European qualification see Premier League – Competition
(C) Champions

==== Results summary ====
Overall								Home						Away					
Pld	W	D	L	GF	GA	GD	Pts	W	D	L	GF	GA	GD	W	D	L	GF	GA	GD
38	24	11	3	74	31	+43	83	14	5	0	37	11	+26	10	6	3	37	20	+17

==== Results by round ====
Round	1	2	3	4	5	6	7	8	9	10	11	12	13	14	15	16	17	18	19	20	21	22	23	24	25	26	27	28	29	30	31	32	33	34	35	36	37	38
Ground	H	A	H	H	A	H	A	H	H	A	H	A	H	A	A	A	H	H	A	A	H	H	A	H	A	H	A	H	A	H	A	A	H	A	H	A	H	A
Result	W	D	W	W	W	W	W	W	W	D	D	W	W	W	D	L	W	W	D	W	W	D	W	W	W	W	D	D	D	D	L	W	D	L	W	W	W	W
Position	4	7	6	2	1	1	1	1	1	1	1	1	1	1	1	1	1	1	2	1	1	2	2	1	1	1	1	1	1	2	3	2	3	3	3	3	3	3

A = Away; H = Home; W = Win; D = Draw; L = Loss

== UEFA Champions League ==
=== Third qualifying round ===
As Arsenal finished fourth in the league the previous season, the club played a qualifying round against Sparta Prague to ensure progression into the group stages. Goals from Fàbregas and Hleb in the away leg earned a 2–0 win and a 3–0 victory at home meant Arsenal qualified for a 10th successive season in the competition.

15 August 2007 First leg	Sparta Prague (Czech Republic)	0–2	(England) Arsenal	Prague
19:45 BST	Hušek (yellow card) 9'; Kulič (yellow card) 17'	Report	Fàbregas (yellow card) 25', (goal) 72'; Flamini (yellow card) 38' van Persie (yellow card) 45+2'; Hleb 90+2'	Stadium: Generali Arena; Attendance: 19,586; Referee: Luis Medina Cantalejo (Spain)

29 August 2007 Second leg	Arsenal (England)	3–0 (5–0 agg.)	(Czech Republic) Sparta Prague	London
19:45 BST	Rosický 8'; Fàbregas 82'; Walcott (yellow card) 84'; Eduardo 89'	Report	Kulič (yellow card) 29'; Řepka (yellow card) 51'; Hušek (yellow card) 87'	Stadium: Emirates Stadium; Attendance: 58,462; Referee: Frank De Bleeckere (Belgium)

=== Group stage ===
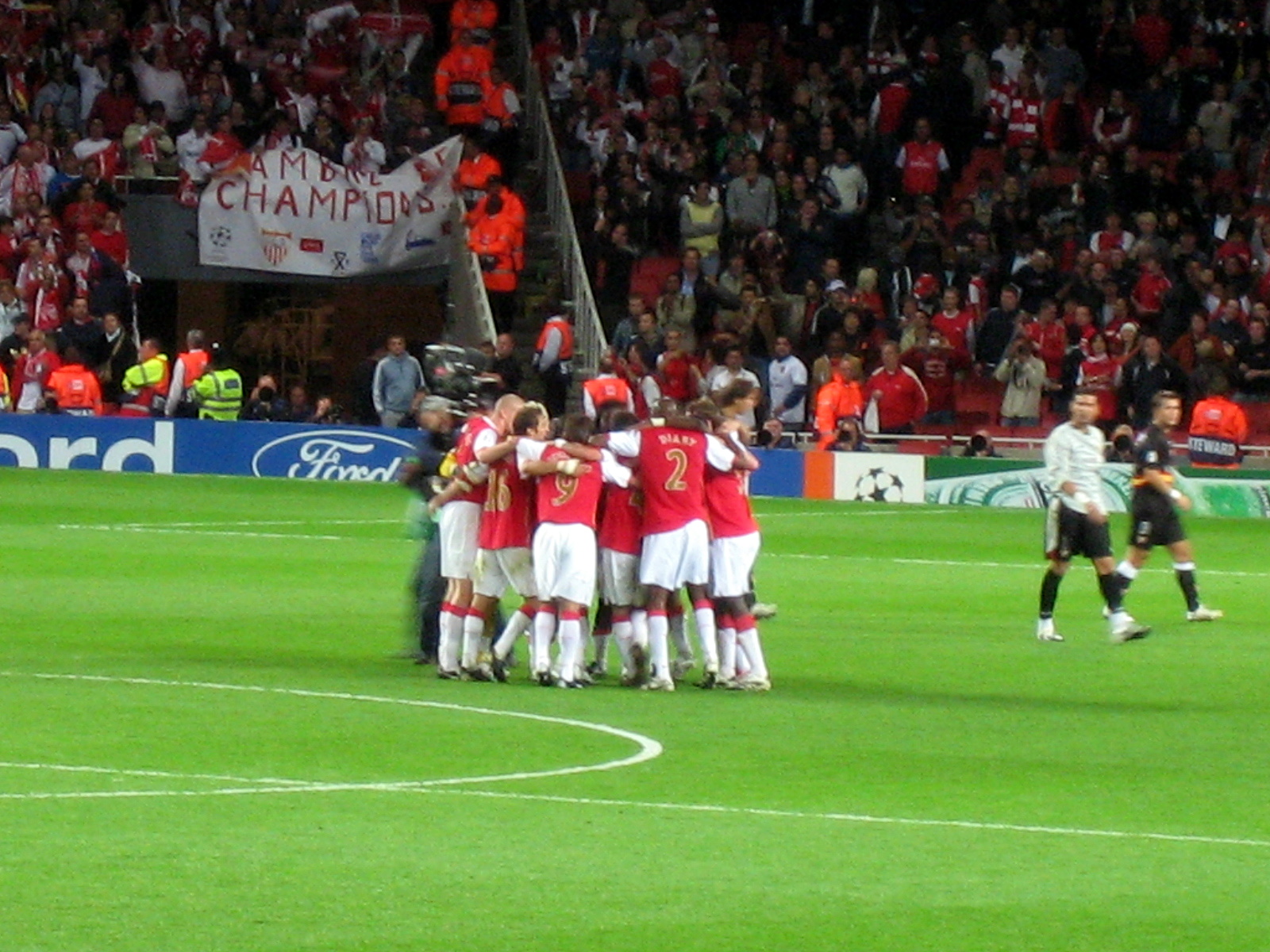
Arsenal players celebrating their win against Sevilla in September 2007.

The club were drawn in Group H, along with UEFA Cup holders Sevilla, Slavia Prague of the Czech Republic and Romania's Steaua București. Arsenal started their campaign in good stead, beating Sevilla 3–0 and followed the result with a 1–0 victory against Steaua București. Against Slavia Prague at the Emirates, Arsenal equalled their best ever victory in a European competition, scoring seven goals. Walcott, who scored his first two goals of the season in the match, earned the praise of manager Wenger: "Once Theo scored his first, you saw him much more. When they opened up the space, you could see his runs and pace, and the fact he is clinical in front of goal." Qualification into the knockout stages was ensured with a draw away to Slavia Prague on 7 November 2007. Defeat against Sevilla at the Ramón Sánchez Pizjuán Stadium was Arsenal's first loss since April 2007, ending a run of 28 matches undefeated in all competitions. The result moved them down into second place, and in spite of winning their final group match against Steaua at home, Arsenal ended two points behind group winners Sevilla.

Pos	Team	Pld	W	D	L	GF	GA	GD	Pts	Qualification
1	(Spain) Sevilla	6	5	0	1	14	7	+7	15	Advance to knockout stage
2	(England) Arsenal	6	4	1	1	14	4	+10	13	Advance to knockout stage
3	(Czech Republic) Slavia Prague	6	1	2	3	5	16	−11	5	Transfer to UEFA Cup
4	(Romania) Steaua București	6	0	1	5	4	10	−6	1	

Source: RSSSF

19 September 2007 1	Arsenal (England)	3–0	(Spain) Sevilla	London
19:45 BST	Fàbregas 28'; Adebayor (yellow card) 49'; Van Persie 59'; Eduardo 90+2'	Report	Dani Alves (yellow card) 74'; Keita (yellow card) 85'	Stadium: Emirates Stadium; Attendance: 59,992; Referee: Peter Frojdfeldt (Sweden)

2 October 2007 2	Steaua București (Romania)	0–1	(England) Arsenal	Bucharest
20:45 CET	Marin (yellow card) 18'; Rada (yellow card) 32'	Report	Adebayor (yellow card) 15'; Van Persie 76'	Stadium: Stadionul Steaua; Attendance: 12,807; Referee: Terje Hauge (Norway)

23 October 2007 3	Arsenal (England)	7–0	(Czech Republic) Slavia Prague	London
19:45 BST	Fàbregas 5', 58'; Flamini (yellow card) 11'; Hubáček 24' (o.g.); Walcott 41', 55'; Hleb 51', (yellow card) 59'; Clichy (yellow card) 52'; Bendtner 89'	Report	Volešák (yellow card) 71'	Stadium: Emirates Stadium; Attendance: 59,621; Referee: Stefano Farina (Italy)

7 November 2007 4	Slavia Prague (Czech Republic)	0–0	(England) Arsenal	Prague
20:45 CET	Tavares (yellow card) 41'; Švec (yellow card) 47'; Krajčík (yellow card) 72'; Pudil (yellow card) 84'	Report	Diarra (yellow card) 52'; Denílson (yellow card) 82'	Stadium: Stadion Evžena Rošického; Attendance: 18,000; Referee: Bertrand Layec (France)

27 November 2007 5	Sevilla (Spain)	3–1	(England) Arsenal	Seville
20:45 CET	Crespo (yellow card) 21'; Keita 24', (yellow card) 90+1'; Luís Fabiano 34'; Adriano (yellow card) 44'; Palop (yellow card) 50'; Kanouté 89' (pen.)	Report	Eduardo 11'; Hoyte (yellow card) 44'; Denílson (yellow card) 50'	Stadium: Ramón Sánchez Pizjuán Stadium; Attendance: 35,529; Referee: Eric Braamhaar (Netherlands)

12 December 2007 6	Arsenal (England)	2–1	(Romania) Steaua București	London
19:45 GMT	Diaby 8'; Bendtner (yellow card) 39', (goal) 42'	Report	Neaga (yellow card) 38'; Zaharia 68'	Stadium: Emirates Stadium; Attendance: 59,786; Referee: Yuri Baskakov (Russia)

=== Knockout stage ===
==== First knockout round ====
Arsenal was drawn against Champions League holders Milan in the knockout stages. In the first leg, Arsenal was held to a draw at home, with their best chance of winning the match coming in stoppage time; Adebayor headed the ball against the crossbar. A week later at the San Siro, the team produced a performance "with style, intelligence and discipline", to win the match by two goals to nil. In doing so, they progressed into the last eight and became the first English team to beat Milan, away from home.

20 February 2008 First leg	Arsenal (England)	0–0	(Italy) Milan	London
19:45 GMT	Senderos (yellow card) 70'; Eboué (yellow card) 81'	Report	Pato (yellow card) 33'	Stadium: Emirates Stadium; Attendance: 60,082; Referee: Claus Bo Larsen (Denmark)

4 March 2008 Second leg	Milan (Italy)	0–2 (0–2 agg.)	(England) Arsenal	Milan
20:45 CET	Inzaghi (yellow card) 55'; Kaká (yellow card) 80'; Pirlo (yellow card) 85'	Report	Hleb (yellow card) 33'; Eboué (yellow card) 56'; Clichy (yellow card) 72'; Fàbregas 84'; Adebayor 90+2'	Stadium: San Siro; Attendance: 81,879; Referee: Konrad Plautz (Austria)

==== Quarter-finals ====
In the quarter-finals, Arsenal played against fellow English club Liverpool, with the first leg at home. The two matches were played either side of a Premier League match between the two sides. Adebayor scored the first goal – he headed the ball from a corner, before Dirk Kuyt equalised three minutes later. Arsenal had a strong penalty appeal harshly turned down after Kuyt seemingly pulled Alexander Hleb in the penalty box and missed a chance to score a second goal, had Bendtner not managed to inadvertently clear Fàbregas' strike. In the return leg at Anfield, Arsenal made the better start of the two teams and took the lead when Diaby scored from a tight angle in the 13th minute. Sami Hyypiä equalised from a header before Fernando Torres received a long pass and swivelled to shoot the ball with his right foot, sending it into the top-left hand corner of Arsenal's goal. With five minutes remaining of the second half, substitute Walcott "covered some 80 yards at pace" to get past the Liverpool defenders and passed the ball for Adebayor, in the middle of the pitch to score. Touré moments after was adjudged to have fouled Ryan Babel and conceded a penalty kick; Gerrard converted the ball into the net to make the scoreline 4–3 on aggregate. In stoppage time Babel scored Liverpool's fourth, meaning they faced Chelsea in the semi-finals. Wenger in his post-match news conference questioned the "dodgy decision" to give Liverpool a penalty and commented the defeat was "not down to mental strength ... It was down to a lack of experience defensively."

2 April 2008 First leg	Arsenal (England)	1–1	(England) Liverpool	London
19:45 BST	Adebayor 23'	Report	Kuyt 26'	Stadium: Emirates Stadium; Attendance: 60,041; Referee: Pieter Vink (Netherlands)

8 April 2008 Second leg	Liverpool (England)	4–2 (5–3 agg.)	(England) Arsenal	Liverpool
19:45 BST	Hyypiä 30'; Torres 69'; Gerrard 85' (pen.); Babel 90+2'	Report	Diaby 13'; Senderos (yellow card) 17'; Adebayor 84'; Touré (yellow card) 85'	Stadium: Anfield; Attendance: 41,985; Referee: Peter Frojdfeldt (Sweden)

== FA Cup ==
Arsenal entered the FA Cup in the third round, where they were drawn to play Championship opposition Burnley. Goals from Eduardo and Bendtner, in either half of the match ensured victory for a "second-string" team. Against Newcastle United a fortnight later, a 3–0 victory meant Arsenal progressed into the fifth round, where they faced Manchester United away. The match played on 16 February 2008, ended in a "embarrassingly one-sided victory" for the home team; defender Emmanuel Eboué was notably dismissed for a high challenge on Patrice Evra.

6 January 2008 Third round	Burnley	0–2	Arsenal	Burnley
14:00 GMT	Lafferty (red card) 60'; Caldwell (yellow card) 86'	Report	Eduardo 7'; Bendtner 75'	Stadium: Turf Moor; Attendance: 16,709; Referee: Alan Wiley

26 January 2008 Fourth round	Arsenal	3–0	Newcastle United	London
15:00 GMT	Adebayor 51', 83'; Butt 89' (o.g.)	Report	Caçapa (yellow card) 75'	Stadium: Emirates Stadium; Attendance: 60,046; Referee: Martin Atkinson

16 February 2008 Fifth round	Manchester United	4–0	Arsenal	Manchester
17:15 GMT	Rooney 16'; Fletcher 20', 74'; Nani 38'	Report		Stadium: Old Trafford; Attendance: 75,550; Referee: Alan Wiley

== League Cup ==
Arsenal began their League Cup campaign in the third round, drawn at home to Newcastle United. They made nine changes from the previous starting XI – Eduardo paired up with Bendtner in the front two. Bendtner scored the opening goal seven minutes from the end of normal time; Denílson added a second goal to ensure Arsenal's progression. Fourth-round opponents Sheffield United were easier to defeat, with Eduardo scoring a brace (two goals). The quarter-final pitted Arsenal away to Blackburn Rovers, in a match played on 18 December 2007. Diaby gave Arsenal the lead with a volley after six minutes and Eduardo extended the lead, before Roque Santa Cruz pulled a goal back for Blackburn, three minutes from the end of the first half. Santa Cruz scored the equaliser and his second of the match, heading in a cross by David Bentley. In stoppage time, Denílson was sent off for a two-footed challenge on Dunn. In spite of playing with one less player, Arsenal regained the lead. Alex Song passed the ball to Eduardo, who held off his opponent Ryan Nelsen and with minimal effort placed it past Brad Friedel. The performance prompted Wenger to assert that his team could win the cup, while opposing manager Mark Hughes commented that Arsenal's blend of young players were capable of following in the footsteps of Manchester United's fledglings, managed by Alex Ferguson.

Arsenal was drawn against Tottenham Hotspur in the two-legged semifinal. In the first leg, at the Emirates, Arsenal scored a late equaliser to even the tie at 1–1. However, a 5–1 victory for Tottenham in the return leg meant it was their first victory over their north London rivals in nine years. Wenger after the game defended his policy to play a young side, adding: "The only regret I have is to have played the players who should not have played."

25 September 2007 Third round	Arsenal	2–0	Newcastle United	London
19:45 BST	Bendtner 83'; Denílson 89'	Report		Stadium: Emirates Stadium; Attendance: 60,004; Referee: Howard Webb

31 October 2007 Fourth round	Sheffield United	0–3	Arsenal	Sheffield
19:45 BST		Report	Eduardo 8', 50'; Denílson 69'	Stadium: Bramall Lane; Attendance: Mike Dean; Referee: 16,971

18 December 2007 Fifth round	Blackburn Rovers	2–3 (a.e.t.)	Arsenal	Blackburn
20:00 GMT	Santa Cruz 42', 60'	Report	Diaby 6'; Eduardo 29', 104'	Stadium: Ewood Park; Attendance: 16,207; Referee: Mike Riley

9 January 2008 Semi-final, first leg	Arsenal	1–1	Tottenham Hotspur	London
19:45 GMT	Walcott 79'	Report	Jenas 37'	Stadium: Emirates Stadium; Attendance: 53,136; Referee: Mike Dean

22 January 2008 Semi-final, second leg	Tottenham Hotspur	5–1 (6–2 agg.)	Arsenal	London
20:00 GMT	Jenas 3', (yellow card) 72'; Malbranque (yellow card) 20', (goal) 90+4'; Bendtner 27' (o.g.); Keane 48'; Lennon 60'	Report	Hoyte (yellow card) 62'; Adebayor 70', (yellow card) 74'	Stadium: White Hart Lane; Attendance: 35,979; Referee: Howard Webb

== Squad statistics ==
No.	Pos	Nat	Player	Total		Premier League		FA Cup		League Cup		Champions League	
No.	Pos	Nat	Player	Apps	Goals	Apps	Goals	Apps	Goals	Apps	Goals	Apps	Goals
1	GK	(Germany) GER	Jens Lehmann	13	0	6+1	0	3	0	0	0	3	0
2	MF	(France) FRA	Abou Diaby	28	4	9+6	1	2	0	4+1	1	5+1	2
3	DF	(France) FRA	Bacary Sagna	40	1	29	1	1	0	1+1	0	7+1	0
4	MF	(Spain) ESP	Cesc Fàbregas	45	13	32	7	2	0	0+1	0	9+1	6
5	DF	(Ivory Coast) CIV	Kolo Touré	41	2	29+1	2	2	0	0	0	9	0
6	DF	(Switzerland) SUI	Philippe Senderos	32	2	14+3	2	2+1	0	3	0	8+1	0
7	MF	(Czech Republic) CZE	Tomáš Rosický	24	7	15+3	6	1	0	0	0	3+2	1
8	MF	(France) FRA	Lassana Diarra	13	0	4+3	0	0	0	3	0	1+2	0
9	FW	(Croatia) CRO	Eduardo	31	12	13+4	4	2+1	1	3+2	4	4+2	3
10	DF	(France) FRA	William Gallas	42	4	31	4	2	0	1	0	8	0
11	FW	(Netherlands) NED	Robin van Persie	23	9	13+2	7	0	0	1	0	6+1	2
13	MF	(Belarus) BLR	Alexander Hleb	42	4	29+2	2	1+1	0	1	0	8	2
15	MF	(Brazil) BRA	Denílson	23	2	4+9	0	1	0	5	2	3+1	0
16	MF	(France) FRA	Mathieu Flamini	40	3	30	3	1+1	0	0	0	8	0
17	DM	(Cameroon) CMR	Alex Song	15	0	5+4	0	0	0	3	0	2+1	0
19	MF	(Brazil) BRA	Gilberto Silva	36	1	12+11	1	2+1	0	3	0	3+4	0
20	DF	(Switzerland) SUI	Johan Djourou	3	0	1+1	0	0	0	1	0	0	0
21	GK	(Poland) POL	Łukasz Fabiański	8	0	3	0	0	0	5	0	0	0
22	DF	(France) FRA	Gaël Clichy	49	0	37+1	0	1	0	0	0	10	0
24	GK	(Spain) ESP	Manuel Almunia	38	0	29	0	0	0	0	0	9	0
25	FW	(Togo) TOG	Emmanuel Adebayor	48	30	32+4	24	1+1	2	0+1	1	7+2	3
26	FW	(Denmark) DEN	Nicklas Bendtner	40	9	7+20	5	2	1	5	1	3+3	2
27	DF	(Ivory Coast) CIV	Emmanuel Eboué	36	0	20+3	0	2	0	1	0	8+2	0
30	DF	(France) FRA	Armand Traoré	11	0	1+2	0	2	0	4	0	2	0
31	DF	(England) ENG	Justin Hoyte	15	0	2+3	0	2+1	0	5	0	2	0
32	FW	(England) ENG	Theo Walcott	39	7	11+14	4	1	0	4	1	4+5	2
33	DF	(England) ENG	Matthew Connolly	2	0	0	0	0	0	1+1	0	0	0
34	DF	(England) ENG	Kieran Gibbs	2	0	0	0	0	0	1+1	0	0	0
36	MF	(England) ENG	Mark Randall	3	0	0+1	0	0	0	1+1	0	0	0
39	MF	(England) ENG	Henri Lansbury	1	0	0	0	0	0	0+1	0	0	0
40	GK	(Italy) ITA	Vito Mannone	0	0	0	0	0	0	0	0	0	0
42	MF	(Spain) ESP	Fran Mérida	3	0	0	0	0	0	0+3	0	0	0
43	MF	(Netherlands) NED	Nacer Barazite	2	0	0	0	0	0	0+2	0	0	0
46	DF	(England) ENG	Kerrea Gilbert	0	0	0	0	0	0	0	0	0	0

[L] – Out on loan, [S] – Sold

== See also ==
- 2007–08 in English football
- List of Arsenal F.C. seasons
