= 2-oxoaldehyde dehydrogenase (NAD+) =

Enzyme

2-oxoaldehyde dehydrogenase (NAD)

Identifiers
- EC no.: 1.2.1.23
- CAS no.: 37250-91-2

Databases
- IntEnz: IntEnz view
- BRENDA: BRENDA entry
- ExPASy: NiceZyme view
- KEGG: KEGG entry
- MetaCyc: metabolic pathway
- PRIAM: profile
- PDB structures: RCSB PDB PDBe PDBsum
- Gene Ontology: AmiGO / QuickGO
Search
- PMC: articles
- PubMed: articles
- NCBI: proteins

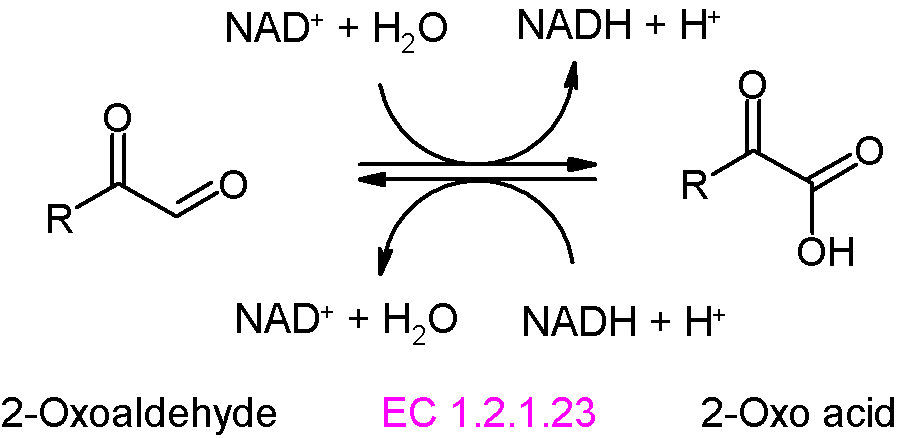
2-oxoaldehyde dehydrogenase (NAD+) reaction

In enzymology, a 2-oxoaldehyde dehydrogenase (NAD+) (EC 1.2.1.23) is an enzyme that catalyzes the chemical reaction

a 2-oxoaldehyde + NAD^{+} + H_{2}O $\rightleftharpoons$ a 2-oxo acid + NADH + H^{+}

The 3 substrates of this enzyme are 2-oxoaldehyde, NAD^{+}, and H_{2}O, whereas its 3 products are 2-oxo acid, NADH, and H^{+}.

This enzyme participates in pyruvate metabolism.

== Nomenclature ==
This enzyme belongs to the family of oxidoreductases, specifically those acting on the aldehyde or oxo group of donor with NAD+ or NADP+ as acceptor. The systematic name of this enzyme class is 2-oxoaldehyde:NAD+ 2-oxidoreductase. Other names in common use include:

- alpha-ketoaldehyde dehydrogenase
- methylglyoxal dehydrogenase
- NAD+-linked alpha-ketoaldehyde dehydrogenase
- 2-ketoaldehyde dehydrogenase
- NAD+-dependent alpha-ketoaldehyde dehydrogenase
- 2-oxoaldehyde dehydrogenase (NAD+)

== See also ==
- 2-oxoaldehyde dehydrogenase (NADP+)
