= GF Biochemicals =

Italian biochemical company

- Key people: Pasquale Granata, Mathieu Flamini
- Number of employees: 80
- Website: www.gfbiochemicals.com

GF Biochemicals is a biochemical company founded in 2008. It was co-founded by and named after Pasquale Granata and Mathieu Flamini. Along with Biofine, it is a mass producer of levulinic acid.

The company worked with the University of Pisa for seven years on its production. In 2016 GF Biochemicals acquired the American company Segetis. The company has a plant in Caserta that employs around 80 people. In 2015, the company won the John Sime Award for Most Innovative New Technology. The company has offices in Milan and the Netherlands.
