= Mathieu Flamini =

French footballer (born 1984)

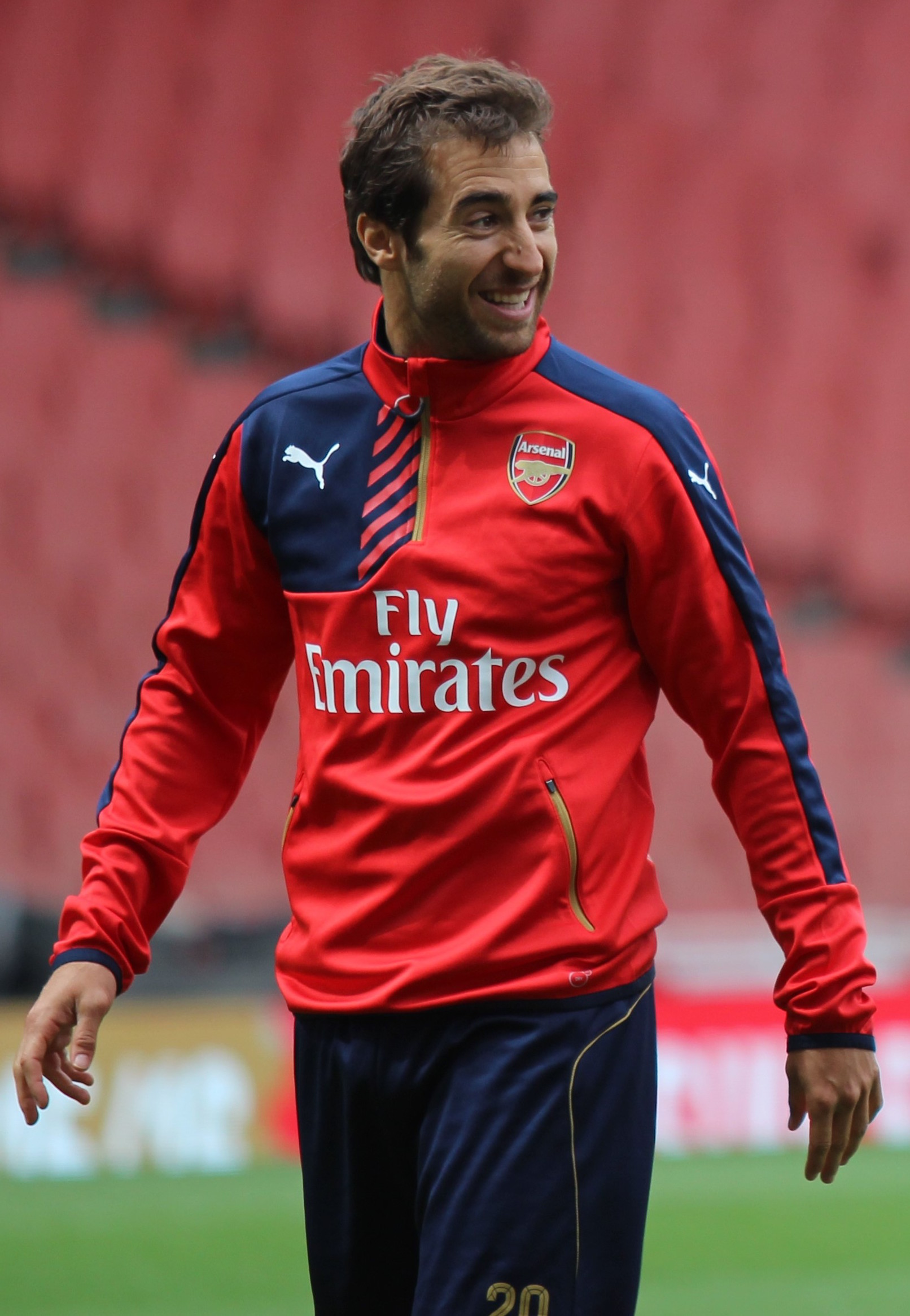
- Flamini in training for Arsenal in 2015

Personal information
- Full name: Mathieu Pierre Flamini
- Date of birth: 7 March 1984 (age 42)
- Place of birth: Marseille, France
- Height: 1.78 m (5 ft 10 in)
- Position: Midfielder

Youth career
- 1992–2003: Marseille

Senior career*
Years	Team	Apps	(Gls)
2003–2004	Marseille	14	(0)
2004–2008	Arsenal	102	(7)
2008–2013	Milan	97	(7)
2013–2016	Arsenal	66	(3)
2016–2017	Crystal Palace	10	(0)
2018–2019	Getafe	18	(0)
Total		307	(17)

International career
2004–2005	France U21	8	(1)
2007–2008	France	3	(0)
- * Club domestic league appearances and goals

Mathieu Pierre Flamini (born 7 March 1984) is a French entrepreneur and former professional footballer. A midfielder, he played for French side Marseille, English sides Arsenal and Crystal Palace, Italian side Milan and Spanish side Getafe. At international level, he was capped by the France national team on three occasions.

Flamini is a co-founder of GF Biochemicals, the first company in the world able to mass-produce levulinic acid.

== Club career ==
=== Marseille ===
Born in Marseille, Flamini was a youth team player for his local professional club Marseille. He made his debut for the senior team on 20 December 2003 in the 1–0 victory over Toulouse. He impressed the team as a hardworking midfield player and played 14 times for the club. However, it was his performances in Marseille's UEFA Cup campaign that brought him to the attention of the football world, including the 2–0 semi-final victory over Newcastle United. He then started in the Final in Gothenburg, a match Spanish club Valencia won 2–0. Due to his age, however, Marseille was later unable to offer him a long-term professional contract.

=== Arsenal ===
On 23 July 2004, Flamini signed a professional contract for English club Arsenal, rejecting Marseille's long-term senior contract offer to which he had already verbally agreed. Soon after the incident, then-Marseille manager José Anigo stated, "This is a beautiful treason. He used me." Arsenal were eventually ordered by The Dispute Resolution Chamber of FIFA to pay Marseille a compensation fee of €480 000 for Flamini.

Flamini made his Arsenal debut in the 1–4 win at Everton on 15 August 2004. In his first season, he was typically used as a utility player, starting only nine games but used as a substitute in 12. The following season saw him filling in for a number of injured players, but again unable to command a first team place in his favoured position. He scored his first Arsenal goal on 11 May 2005 in a 7–0 home win against Everton, scoring the seventh goal, the team's last-ever goal scored in their traditional red and white kit at Highbury.

In the 2006–07 season, Flamini scored the winning goal against Dinamo Zagreb in the qualifying stages of the UEFA Champions League. He also scored important goals against Chelsea, Blackburn Rovers and Liverpool in the Premier League. Despite these important goals, however, he remained unsatisfied with his "utility player" role at the club and in April 2007, he admitted that he would most likely be leaving Arsenal in the summer. Flamini, however, turned down a proposed £3m move to Birmingham City and remained with the team.

Flamini started in central midfield for Arsenal's first match of the 2007–08 Premier League season due to the absence of Gilberto Silva and Abou Diaby. During Arsenal's 2007–08 campaign, he struck up a strong partnership with Cesc Fàbregas, keeping Gilberto out of the starting XI with displays widely regarded by Arsenal fans as a vast improvement on those during his previous years at the club. Flamini enjoyed a generally good rapport with Arsenal's fans, who provided him with his own song, an adaptation of the theme tune to British television programme The Sweeney. On 29 January 2008, he scored an extraordinary 25-yard (23 m) strike in Arsenal's 3–0 win over Newcastle United in the Premier League. He played on 8 April 2008, a UEFA Champions League match in which Arsenal were knocked out by English rival Liverpool. After the match, he was reported injured and it proved to be his last match for Arsenal. In April 2009, he stated in an interview that he is still an Arsenal fan and that he has no hard feelings towards the club: "Arsenal are in my heart and they will be in my heart for ever," he said. "I will always be an Arsenal fan and leaving was not easy."

=== Milan ===
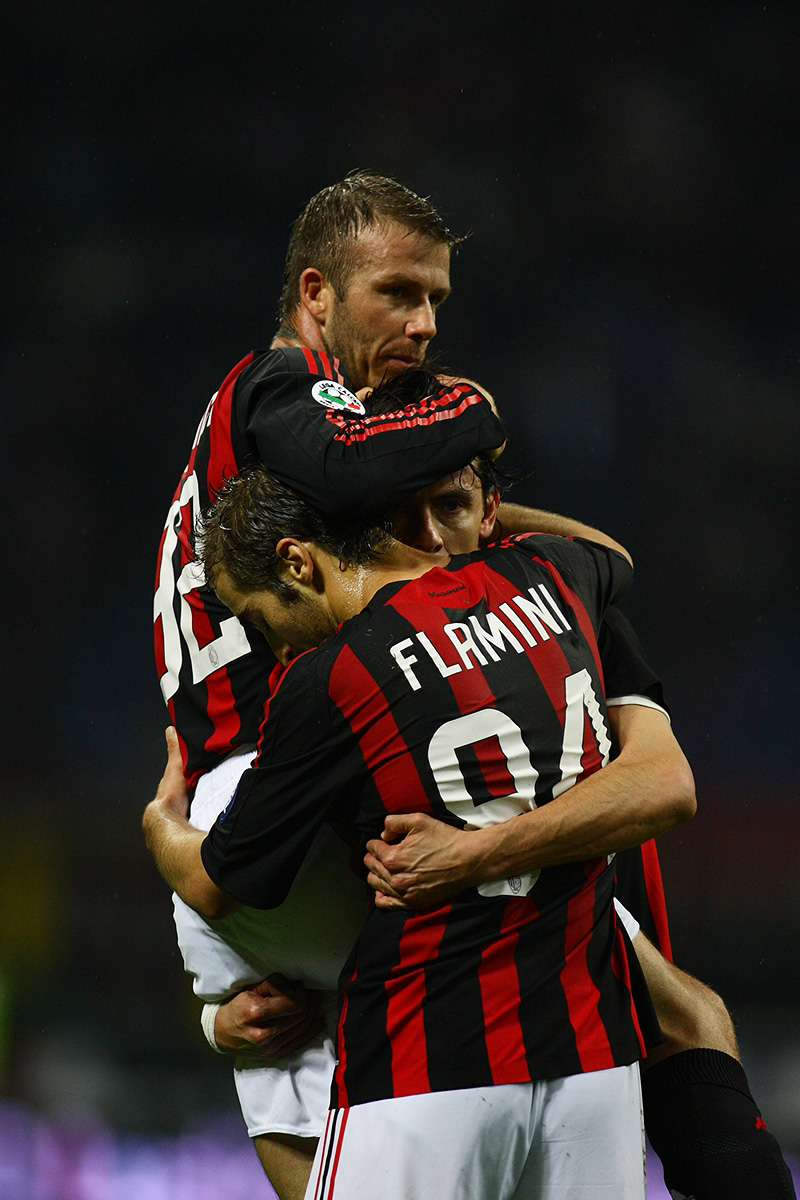
Flamini with David Beckham and Filippo Inzaghi in action for Milan, celebrating a goal against Torino in the Serie A, at the San Siro.

Flamini signed a contract with Italian club Milan on 5 May 2008. Flamini wore the number 84 on his shirt to represent his year of birth.

He made his Serie A debut on 30 August 2008 in a 2–1 loss to Bologna. Initially, Flamini did not enjoy the number of starts or appearances for the Italian team, and was regarded as a utility player at Milan. Nevertheless, injuries to other players and his consistent good form helped him to cement a starting place at San Siro. With Milan failing to find a stable defence and a lack of a fit, consistent and reliable right back, Gianluca Zambrotta was switched to the left flank to help Flamini develop as a tenacious right back. After stating that his preferred position is in the midfield, Milan re-deployed him as a defensive midfielder.

Flamini saw limited playing time towards the end of 2009–10 season due to the great form of club captain Massimo Ambrosini. In the following season, Flamini became an important asset of the team that would win its 18th scudetto, playing many games as starter and scoring two goals against Bari and Bologna, respectively. After playing as a rotation role in the 2010–11 season, he injured himself in a pre-season training session, suffering a serious knee injury which required an operation. Flamini spent the entire 2011–12 season out.

On 20 June 2012, it was confirmed by the club that he had left following the expiration of his contract, as they had ended negotiations with the player, and so he became a free agent. Two weeks later, Flamini and Adriano Galliani reached a new agreement for a one-year contract, with the Frenchman taking a significant cut in his wages. On 7 April 2013, Flamini scored his first goal of the season, and Milan's second of the game, in a 2–2 draw against Fiorentina.

=== Return to Arsenal ===
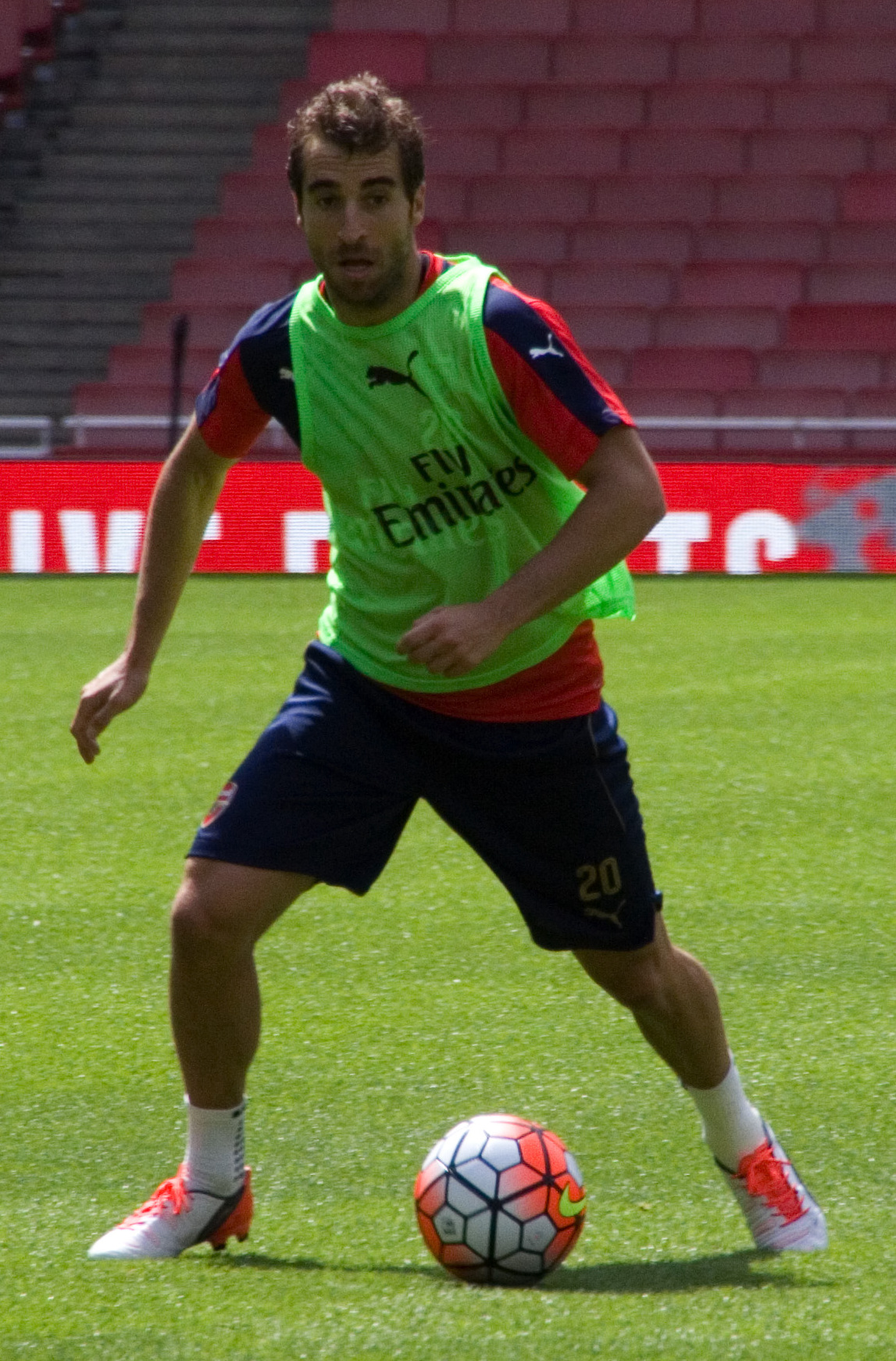
Flamini in 2015

Flamini began training with Arsenal midway in early August, with the reason to "solely maintain fitness" with a view to signing for a club in England. Immediately it sparked media attention with claims rising that he would soon sign for Arsenal, but these reports were shunned by many journalists, pointing out that many other ex-Arsenal players had returned to train with Arsenal, including club legends Robert Pires and Thierry Henry.

Flamini, however, did indeed sign for Arsenal on 29 August 2013 and became Arsenal's second acquisition of the summer, after Yaya Sanogo. He made his returning debut on 1 September at Emirates Stadium against Tottenham Hotspur, coming on for Jack Wilshere and helping the team secure a 1–0 win. His performances after signing were lauded by both critics and fans alike, and had featured in all of Arsenal's Premier League, Football League Cup and European games since, with many seeing his signing, and his combative style of play, as one of the key reasons for Arsenal's excellent early season form. He scored his first goal in his second spell at Arsenal on 30 November, the second in a 0–3 away win at Cardiff City. He has also scored in a crucial 1–1 draw against Manchester City after a run of bad form from Arsenal, helping the club rejuvenate and achieve an eventual top four league finish. At the start of Arsenal's 2013–14 FA Cup run, Flamini expressed his desire to win the Cup, having been left out of the squad when Arsenal won the 2005 FA Cup Final. Arsenal went on to win the tournament, though Flamini was an unused substitute in the Final, also remaining on the substitutes' bench when Arsenal repeated the feat, becoming FA Cup champions again in 2015.

On 23 September 2015, Flamini earned his first start of the 2015–16 season in the Football League Cup third round tie against Tottenham Hotspur. He scored both of Arsenal's goals with a Man of the Match performance.

=== Late career ===
Flamini signed as a free-agent for Crystal Palace at the beginning of the 2016–17 season, and released by the club at the season's end. He joined Getafe in February 2018, making eight appearances in La Liga before leaving the club at the end of the season. He rejoined Getafe in December 2018, until his contract expired in July 2019 and officially retired from football in 2020.

== International career ==
Flamini accepted his first call up to France by coach Raymond Domenech for a friendly against Argentina at the Stade de France on 7 February 2007 after Jérémy Toulalan was ruled out due to injury. He later made his international debut in a friendly against Morocco on 16 November 2007 as a substitute.

== Style of play ==
A combative, energetic, tactically intelligent, and tenacious midfielder, according to Arsenal manager Arsène Wenger, Flamini was a player with a fantastic work rate, good ball-winning ability and great mentality; he could play anywhere across midfield, in the centre as a box-to-box or defensive midfielder, or on either flank as a cover at full-back.

== Business career ==
Flamini is a partner of GF Biochemicals, a leading global producer of levulinic acid and derivatives. He has stated that “we founded GFBiochemicals with the ambition of finding sustainable alternatives to oil-based products”. Levulinic acid includes grass or woodchips, and can be used in plastics, solvents, fuels and the pharmaceutical industry. Levulinic acid has been identified by the U.S. Department of Energy as one of the 12 molecules that can help unlock a “greener” world.

In addition to GFBiochemicals’ established presence in the Netherlands and headquarters in Italy, Flamini has named China and Brazil as potential new markets for expansion. In 2016, GFBiochemicals fully controls the Segetis, the leading producer of levulinic acid derivatives, in a move towards downstream integration. Segitis was previously owned by Sabic, DSM, and Khosla Ventures, among other entities, and has invested in R&D over the past decade. In 2017, GFBiochemicals announced that it will build a cellulosic biorefinery in the US, in partnership with biotech company American Process.

Flamini was also part of the team that created BIOCIRCE (Bioeconomy in the Circular economy), Europe’s first master's degree dedicated to promoting bioeconomy education. It was launched in collaboration with Italian bank Intesa Sanpaolo, Novamont (a producer of bioplastics), and the Universities of Naples, Turin, Milano-Bicocca and Bologna. In addition, Flamini co-founded The BioJournal the world’s first e-magazine devoted entirely to the bio world and eco-sustainability and managed by Italian environmental journalist Mario Bonaccorso. Flamini was also part of the Environmental Excellence Committee for the candidature of Paris as the location for the 2024 Summer Olympics.

In 2015, Flamini was named one of People of the Year by NME.

== Career statistics ==
=== Club ===
Club	Season	League			National cup (Note: Includes Coupe de France, FA Cup, Coppa Italia, Copa del Rey)		League cup (Note: Includes Football League Cup)		Europe		Other		Total	
Club	Season	Division	Apps	Goals	Apps	Goals	Apps	Goals	Apps	Goals	Apps	Goals	Apps	Goals
Marseille	2003–04	Ligue 1	14	0	1	0	0	0	9 (Note: Appearances in UEFA Cup)	0	—		24	0
Arsenal	2004–05	Premier League	21	1	4	0	3	0	4 (Note: Appearances in UEFA Champions League)	0	0	0	32	1
Arsenal	2005–06	Premier League	31	0	2	0	3	0	12	0	1 (Note: Appearance in FA Community Shield)	0	49	0
Arsenal	2006–07	Premier League	20	3	3	0	3	0	6	1	—		32	4
Arsenal	2007–08	Premier League	30	3	2	0	0	0	8	0	—		40	3
Arsenal	Total		102	7	11	0	9	0	30	1	1	0	153	8
Milan	2008–09	Serie A	29	0	1	0	—		7	0	—		37	0
Milan	2009–10	Serie A	25	0	2	1	—		5	0	—		32	1
Milan	2010–11	Serie A	23	2	2	0	—		5	0	—		30	2
Milan	2011–12	Serie A	2	1	0	0	—		0	0	0	0	2	1
Milan	2012–13	Serie A	18	4	1	0	—		3	0	—		22	4
Milan	Total		97	7	6	1	—		20	0	0	0	123	8
Arsenal	2013–14	Premier League	27	2	3	0	0	0	6	0	—		36	2
Arsenal	2014–15	Premier League	23	1	2	0	0	0	7	0	1	0	33	1
Arsenal	2015–16	Premier League	16	0	2	0	2	2	4	0	0	0	24	2
Arsenal	Total		66	3	7	0	2	2	17	0	1	0	93	5
Arsenal	Arsenal total		168	10	18	0	11	2	47	1	2	0	246	13
Crystal Palace	2016–17	Premier League	10	0	3	0	0	0	—		—		13	0
Getafe	2017–18	La Liga	8	0	0	0	—		—		—		8	0
Getafe	2018–19	La Liga	10	0	3	0	—		—		—		13	0
Getafe	Total		18	0	3	0	—		—		—		21	0
Career total			307	17	31	1	11	2	76	1	2	0	427	21

=== International ===
Appearances and goals by national team and year

National team	Year	Apps	Goals
France	2007	1	0
France	2008	2	0
Total		3	0

== Honours ==
Marseille

- UEFA Cup runner-up: 2003–04

Arsenal

- FA Cup: 2004–05, 2013–14, 2014–15
- FA Community Shield: 2014
- UEFA Champions League runner-up: 2005–06

Milan

- Serie A: 2010–11

Individual

- Arsenal Player of the Season: 2007−08

== Fortune ==
In 2018, Mathieu Flamini denied reports that valued his personal fortune, or his company GF Biochemicals, at 30 billion euros. He explained that the figure represented the estimated size of the entire levulinic acid market that the company sought to enter using its technologies. The figure had been incorrectly reported as an estimate of Flamini's personal wealth.
