= Ryan Garry =

English footballer (born 1983)

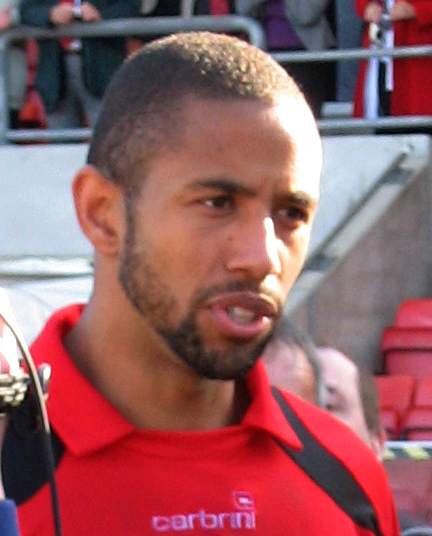
- Garry with AFC Bournemouth in 2009

Personal information
- Full name: Ryan Mayne Felix Garry
- Date of birth: 29 September 1983 (age 43)
- Place of birth: Hornchurch, England
- Height: 6 ft 2 in (1.88 m)
- Position: Defender

Team information
- Current team: Norwich City (first team coach)

Youth career
- 1999–2001: Arsenal

Senior career*
| Years | Team | Apps | (Gls) |
| 2001–2007 | Arsenal | 1 | (0) |
| 2007–2011 | AFC Bournemouth | 76 | (3) |
| Total | | 77 | (3) |

International career
| 2001 | England U17 | 1 | (0) |
| 2002 | England U19 | 5 | (0) |
| 2002–2003 | England U20 | 2 | (0) |

Managerial career
- 2021-2022: England U18
- 2022–2023: England U17
- 2023–2024: England U18
- 2024–2025: Lommel (assistant manager)
- 2025: Lommel (caretaker)
- 2025: Norwich City (caretaker)
- * Club domestic league appearances and goals

Ryan Mayne Felix Garry (born 29 September 1983) is an English professional football coach and a former defender who is currently a first team coach for EFL Championship club Norwich City. During his playing career he featured for Arsenal and AFC Bournemouth.

== Club career ==
=== Arsenal ===
Born in Hornchurch, London, Garry joined Arsenal in 1999 and progressed through their youth academy, winning the FA Youth Cup in 2001. He signed a professional contract with Arsenal on 2 July 2001, and his first team debut came against Sunderland on 6 November 2002 in the League Cup. He made his first starting appearance on 7 May 2003 against Southampton, playing 90 minutes in a 6–1 win which saw hat-tricks from Robert Pires and Jermaine Pennant, the first match of Arsenal's 49-game unbeaten run. However, this proved to be his only league appearance as he was then hit by long-term injury (shin splints) and spent most of the next four seasons on the sidelines.

=== AFC Bournemouth ===
He was released by Arsenal at the end of the 2006–07 season, after which he joined AFC Bournemouth on a contract until January 2008 following a trial. He signed a contract extension in January 2008, which would keep him at the club until the end of the 2007–08 season. He signed a new contract in June.

Garry made his debut for Bournemouth in a 0–0 draw against Nottingham Forest on 11 August 2007. On 15 August 2009, Garry scored his first goal and the only goal in the match against Rotherham United in a 1–0 win. On 25 September 2010, Garry scored his second goal in a 2–0 win over Carlisle United and scored his third in a 1–1 draw against Sheffield Wednesday on 23 October 2010. Garry made his last appearance for Bournemouth against Walsall in a 3–0 victory before Garry suffered an injury.

In July 2011 he was forced to retire from football at the age of 27, after failing to recover from a persistent nerve-related problem in his lower leg and became first-team coach and defensive co-ordinator at Bournemouth. He was released again 10 months later as part of a backroom reshuffle by new manager Paul Groves.

== Coaching career ==
On 27 September 2021, Garry was appointed as head coach of the England U18s following coaching spells with Bournemouth, Nike Academy and Arsenal. On 16 August 2022, Garry was appointed as head coach of the England U17s.

On 18 August 2022, Garry moved across to take charge of England U18s once again ahead of the 2023 FIFA U-17 World Cup.

In January 2024, Garry was appointed as assistant manager at Challenger Pro League side Lommel to work under former Arsenal coach Steve Bould. On 14 January 2025, Garry was appointed caretaker manager of Lommel following Bould's resignation. In March 2025, following the appointment Lee Johnson, Garry returned to his previous role as assistant manager.

In June 2025, Garry joined Championship side Norwich City as first-team coach. He was placed in caretaker charge of the team in November 2025, following the sacking of Liam Manning.

== Honours ==
Arsenal

- FA Youth Cup: 2000–01
