= 2-oxoaldehyde dehydrogenase (NADP+) =

Class of enzymes

Identifiers
- EC no.: 1.2.1.49
- CAS no.: 83588-97-0

Databases
- IntEnz: IntEnz view
- BRENDA: BRENDA entry
- ExPASy: NiceZyme view
- KEGG: KEGG entry
- MetaCyc: metabolic pathway
- PRIAM: profile
- PDB structures: RCSB PDB PDBe PDBsum
- Gene Ontology: AmiGO / QuickGO
Search
- PMC: articles
- PubMed: articles
- NCBI: proteins

In enzymology, a 2-oxoaldehyde dehydrogenase (NADP+) (EC 1.2.1.49) is an enzyme that catalyzes the chemical reaction

a 2-oxoaldehyde + NADP^{+} + H_{2}O $\rightleftharpoons$ a 2-oxo acid + NADPH + H^{+}

The 3 substrates of this enzyme are 2-oxoaldehyde, NADP^{+}, and H_{2}O, whereas its 3 products are 2-oxo acid, NADPH, and H^{+}.

This enzyme belongs to the family of oxidoreductases, specifically those acting on the aldehyde or oxo group of donor with NAD+ or NADP+ as acceptor. The systematic name of this enzyme class is 2-oxoaldehyde:NADP+ 2-oxidoreductase. Other names in common use include alpha-ketoaldehyde dehydrogenase, methylglyoxal dehydrogenase, NADP+-linked alpha-ketoaldehyde dehydrogenase, 2-ketoaldehyde dehydrogenase, NADP+-dependent alpha-ketoaldehyde dehydrogenase, and 2-oxoaldehyde dehydrogenase (NADP+). This enzyme participates in pyruvate metabolism.
